= Greenbank (ward) =

Former ward of Liverpool City Council (UK)

Coordinates: 53.388°N 2.919°W

- Greenbank ward (2004) within Liverpool
- Area: 2.371 km^{2} (0.915 sq mi)
- Population: 15,268 (2021 census)
  - Density: 6,439/km^{2} (16,680/sq mi)
- Metropolitan borough: City of Liverpool
- Metropolitan county: Merseyside
- Region: North West
- Country: England
- Sovereign state: United Kingdom
- UK Parliament: Liverpool Riverside

Greenbank was an electoral district of Liverpool City Council between 2004 and 2023.

== Background ==
The ward was created in 2004 from the majority of the former Arundel ward and parts of the former Aigburth and Picton wards. The ward returned three councillors. It was part of the Liverpool Riverside parliamentary constituency.

The ward boundaries followed the West Coast Main Line, Smithdown Road, Penny Lane, the West Coast Main Line again, Rose Lane, North Mossley Hill Road, Carnatic Road, Mossley Hill Drive, Croxteth Gate, Ullet Road, Sefton Park Road, Lodge Lane, Fern Grove, Hartington Road, along the southern and eastern boundary of Toxteth Park Cemetery, Smithdown Road, Gainsborough Road and Wellington Road.

The ward contained Greenbank Park, Greenbank Drive Synagogue, the University of Liverpool Greenbank Halls, Penny Lane, Liverpool College, Greenbank College and Sports Academy, Mossley Hill Hospital, Sefton Park Cricket Club, and the Grade I listed buildings: Church of St Agnes and St Pancras, Ullet Road Unitarian Church, St Clare's Church, Liverpool.

The population of this ward at the 2011 census was 16,132. and at the 2021 census was 15,268.

The ward was dissolved following a 2022 review by the Local Government Boundary Commission for England which reduced the overall number of councillors and established new wards which were contested at the 2023 elections. Greenbank ward was distributed into the Arundel, Greenbank Park, Penny Lane, Princes Park, and Smithdown wards.

== Councillors ==
The ward returned seven councillors.

Election	Councillor	Councillor	Councillor
2004	Linda-Jane Buckle (LD)	Paul Clein (LD)	Jan Clein (LD)
2006	Linda-Jane Buckle (LD)	Paul Clein (LD)	Jan Clein (LD)
2007	Linda-Jane Buckle (LD)	Paul Clein (LD)	Jan Clein (LD)
2008	Linda-Jane Buckle (LD)	Paul Clein (LD)	Jan Clein (LD)
2010	Elaine Allen (LD)	Paul Clein (LD)	Jan Clein (LD)
2011	Elaine Allen (LD)	Laura Robertson-Collins (Lab)	Jan Clein (LD)
2012	Elaine Allen (LD)	Laura Robertson-Collins (Lab)	James Roberts (Lab)
2014	Lawrence Brown (Grn)	Laura Robertson-Collins (Lab)	James Roberts (Lab)
2015	Lawrence Brown (Grn)	Laura Robertson-Collins (Lab)	James Roberts (Lab)
2016	Lawrence Brown (Grn)	Laura Robertson-Collins (Lab)	James Roberts (Lab)
2018	Lawrence Brown (Grn)	Laura Robertson-Collins (Lab)	James Roberts (Lab)
2019	Lawrence Brown (Grn)	Laura Robertson-Collins (Lab)	James Roberts (Lab)
2021	Lawrence Brown (Grn)	Laura Robertson-Collins (Lab)	James Roberts (Lab)

indicates seat up for re-election after boundary changes.

indicates seat up for re-election.

indicates change in affiliation.

indicates seat up for re-election after casual vacancy.

== Election results ==
=== Elections of the 2020s ===
Liverpool City Council Municipal Elections 2021: 6th May 2021
Party	Candidate	Votes	%	±%
**Labour**	**James Roberts**	**1,978**	**53.39%**	**▲0.69**
Green	Dan Fieldsend	1,336	36.06%	▼5.24
Liberal Democrats	Fiona McBride	162	4.37%	▲1.22
Conservative	Chris Hall	137	3.70%	▲1.48
Liberal	Lindsey Janet Mary Wood	46	1.24%	▲0.61
Independent	Harry Peter Glover	46	1.24%	Steady
Majority		642	17.62	▲6.22
Turnout		3,705	33.36	▼5.19
Registered electors		11,106		
Rejected ballots		62	1.65	▲0.82
Labour **hold**		Swing	2.97	

=== Elections of the 2010s ===
Liverpool City Council Municipal Elections 2019: 2nd May 2019
Party	Candidate	Votes	%	±%
**Labour**	**Laura Robertson-Collins**	**1,757**	**52.70**	**▲7.24**
Green	Kay Alexandra Inckle	1,377	41.30	▼6.94
Liberal Democrats	Dewi Anthony John	105	3.15	▼1.25
Conservative	Nicholas John Basson	74	2.22	▼0.68
Liberal	Donald MacRitchie	21	0.63	N/A
Majority		380	11.40	▲8.62
Turnout		3,362	38.55	▲0.04
Registered electors		8,721		
Rejected ballots		28	0.83	▲0.54
Labour **hold**		Swing	7.09	

Liverpool City Council Municipal Elections 2018: 3rd May 2018
Party	Candidate	Votes	%	±%
**Green**	**Lawrence Brown**	**1,648**	**48.24**	**▲18.03**
Labour	Jon Morris	1,553	45.46	▼11.96
Liberal Democrats	Fiona McBride	116	3.40	▼3.08
Conservative	Nicholas Basson	99	2.90	▼0.71
Majority		95	2.78	▼24.11
Turnout		3426	38.51	▼0.71
Registered electors		8,897		
Rejected ballots		10	0.29	
Green **hold**		Swing	15.00	

Liverpool City Council Municipal Elections 2016: 5th May 2016
Party	Candidate	Votes	%	±%
**Labour**	**James Alexander Roberts**	**1,958**	**56.74**	**▲2.74**
Green	David William Morgan	1,030	29.85	▲0.46
Liberal Democrats	Joe Harmer	221	6.40	▲2.00
Conservative	Nicholas Basson	123	3.56	▼3.77
TUSC	Connor James Lunt	78	2.26	▲0.90
Majority		928	26.89	▲2.28
Turnout		3,451	39.22	▼25.06
Labour **hold**		Swing	1.14	

Liverpool City Council Municipal Elections 2015: 7th May 2015
Party	Candidate	Votes	%	±%
**Labour**	**Laura Robertson-Collins**	**3,375**	**54.00**	**▲16.19**
Green	David William Morgan	1,837	29.39	▼18.79
Conservative	Nicholas Basson	458	7.33	▲3.26
Liberal Democrats	Jeanete Makinson	275	4.40	▲1.49
UKIP	Joseph Stanley Chiffers	220	3.52	▼1.87
TUSC	Simon Adam Worthington	85	1.36	▲0.03
Majority		1,538	24.61	▲14.24
Turnout		6,250	64.28	▲30.10
Labour **hold**		Swing	17.49	

Liverpool City Council Municipal Elections 2014: 22nd May 2014
Party	Candidate	Votes	%	±%
**Green**	**Lawrence Brown**	**1,706**	**48.18**	**▲28.87**
Labour	Graeme Cooper	1,339	37.81	▼22.08
UKIP	Joseph Stanley Chiffers	191	5.39	n/a
Conservative	Nicholas Basson	144	4.07	▼2.52
Liberal Democrats	Jeanette Makinson	103	2.91	▼9.08
TUSC	Simon Worthington	47	1.33	n/a
Liberal	Irene Norah Mayes	11	0.31	▼2.09
Majority		367	10.37	▼29.67
Turnout		3,541	34.18	▲5.97
Green **gain** from Liberal Democrats		Swing	+25.48	

Liverpool City Council Municipal Elections 2012: 3rd May 2012
Party	Candidate	Votes	%	±%
**Labour**	**James Alexander Roberts**	**1,819**	**59.89**	**▲4.01**
Green	Lawrence Brown	581	19.13	▲6.85
Liberal Democrats	Mirna Juarez	364	11.99	▼10.87
Conservative	Giselle McDonald	200	6.59	▲0.59
Liberal	Charles Railton Mayes	73	2.40	▲1.27
Majority		1,238	40.37	▲7.35
Turnout		3,067	28.21	▼8.34
Labour **gain** from Liberal Democrats		Swing	7.44	

Liverpool City Council Municipal Elections 2011: 5th May 2011
Party	Candidate	Votes	%	±%
**Labour**	**Laura Robertson-Collins**	**2,085**	**55.88**	**▲22.18**
Liberal Democrats	Paul Michael Clein	853	22.86	▼18.96
Green	Lawrence Brown	458	12.28	▼0.94
Conservative	Chris Hall	224	6.00	▼−3.29
UKIP	Joseph Stanley Chiffers	69	1.85	n/a
Liberal	Damien Patrick Daly	42	1.13	▼0.84
Majority		1,232	33.02	▲24.90
Turnout		3,731	36.55	▼19.84
Labour **gain** from Liberal Democrats		Swing	20.57	

Liverpool City Council Municipal Elections 2010: Greenbank
Party	Candidate	Votes	%	±%
**Liberal Democrats**	**Elaine Allen**	**2,530**	**41.82**	**▼6.17**
Labour	Laura Annette Robertson-Collins	2,039	33.70	▲10.76
Green	Peter Cranie	800	13.22	▼7.03
Conservative	Christopher Matthew Hall	562	9.29	▲2.58
Liberal	Terry Formby	119	1.97	▼0.14
Majority		491	8.12	▼16.93
Turnout		6,050	56.39	▲8.12
Liberal Democrats **hold**		Swing	-8.47	

=== Elections of the 2000s ===
Liverpool City Council Municipal Elections 2008: Greenbank
Party	Candidate	Votes	%	±%
**Liberal Democrats**	**Janet Clein**	**1,180**	**47.99**	**▼2.07**
Labour	Christopher David Helm	564	22.94	▼0.69
Green	Martin Sydney Dobson	498	20.25	▲3.20
Conservative	Ann Nugent	165	6.71	▲4.44
Liberal	Susan O'Brien	52	2.11	▼0.16
Majority		616	25.05	▼1.37
Turnout		2,459	23.28	▼2.49
Liberal Democrats **hold**		Swing	-0.69	

Liverpool City Council Municipal Elections 2007: Greenbank
Party	Candidate	Votes	%	±%
**Liberal Democrats**	**Paul Clein**	**1,345**	**50.06**	**▲9.27**
Labour	Christopher David Helm	635	23.63	▼1.32
Green	Peter Andrew Edward Cranie	458	17.05	▼2.25
Conservative	Alma Gavine McGing	188	7.00	▼2.79
Liberal	Karen Williams	61	2.27	▼2.90
Majority		710	26.42	
Turnout		2,687	25.77	
Liberal Democrats **hold**		Swing	5.29	

Liverpool City Council Municipal Elections 2006: Greenbank
Party	Candidate	Votes	%	±%
**Liberal Democrats**	**Linda-Jane Buckle**	**1,025**	**40.79**	
Labour	Christopher David Helm	627	24.95	
Green	Louise Maria McVey	485	19.30	
Conservative	Giselle Henrietta Petra McDonald	256	9.79	
Liberal	David O'Brien	130	5.17	
Majority				
Turnout		2,513	23.01	
Liberal Democrats **hold**		Swing		

After the boundary change of 2004 the whole of Liverpool City Council faced election. Three Councillors were returned.

Liverpool City Council Municipal Elections 2004: Greenbank
Party	Candidate	Votes	%	±%
**Liberal Democrats**	**Janet Clein**	**1,649**		
**Liberal Democrats**	**Paul Clein**	**1,616**		
**Liberal Democrats**	**Linda-Jane Buckle**	**1,577**		
Labour	Anna Murphy	568		
Labour	Josephine Lazzari	515		
Labour	Anthony Murphy	507		
Green	Julie Birch-Holt	400		
Green	Andrew Hoban	389		
Green	Penelope Mosgrove	325		
Conservative	John Creagh	208		
Conservative	Peter Henn	202		
Socialist Alliance	Stella Yates	200		
Socialist Alliance	Robert Foulkes	152		
Socialist Alliance	Christopher Jones	145		
Majority				
Turnout		3070	26.88	
Liberal Democrats **hold**		Swing	n/a	

• italics denotes the sitting Councillor • bold denotes the winning candidate
