= 2011 Liverpool City Council election =

2011 UK local government election

2011 Liverpool Council election
← 2010	5 May 2011	2012 →

30 seats were up for election (one third): one seat for each of the 90 wards 46 seats needed for a majority
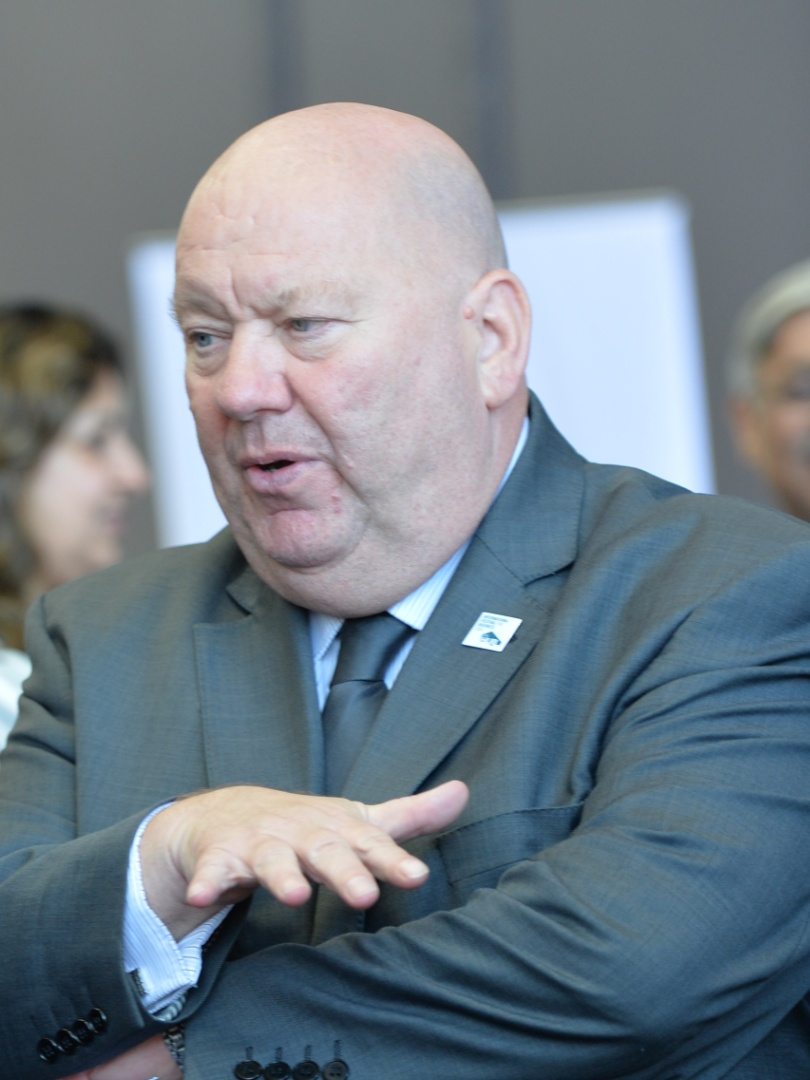
	First party	Second party	Third party
Leader	Joe Anderson	Warren Bradley
Party	Labour	Liberal Democrats	Green
Seats won	26	2	1
Seat change	▲12	▼12	±0
Popular vote	72,281	20,780	6,815
Percentage	63.17%	18.16%	5.96%
Swing	▲25.90%	▼23.23%	▼0.22%
	Fourth party
Party	Liberal
Seats won	1
Seat change	±0
Popular vote	4,674
Percentage	4.08%
Swing	▼2.14%
Leader of Largest Party before election
Labour
Subsequent Leader of Largest Party
Labour

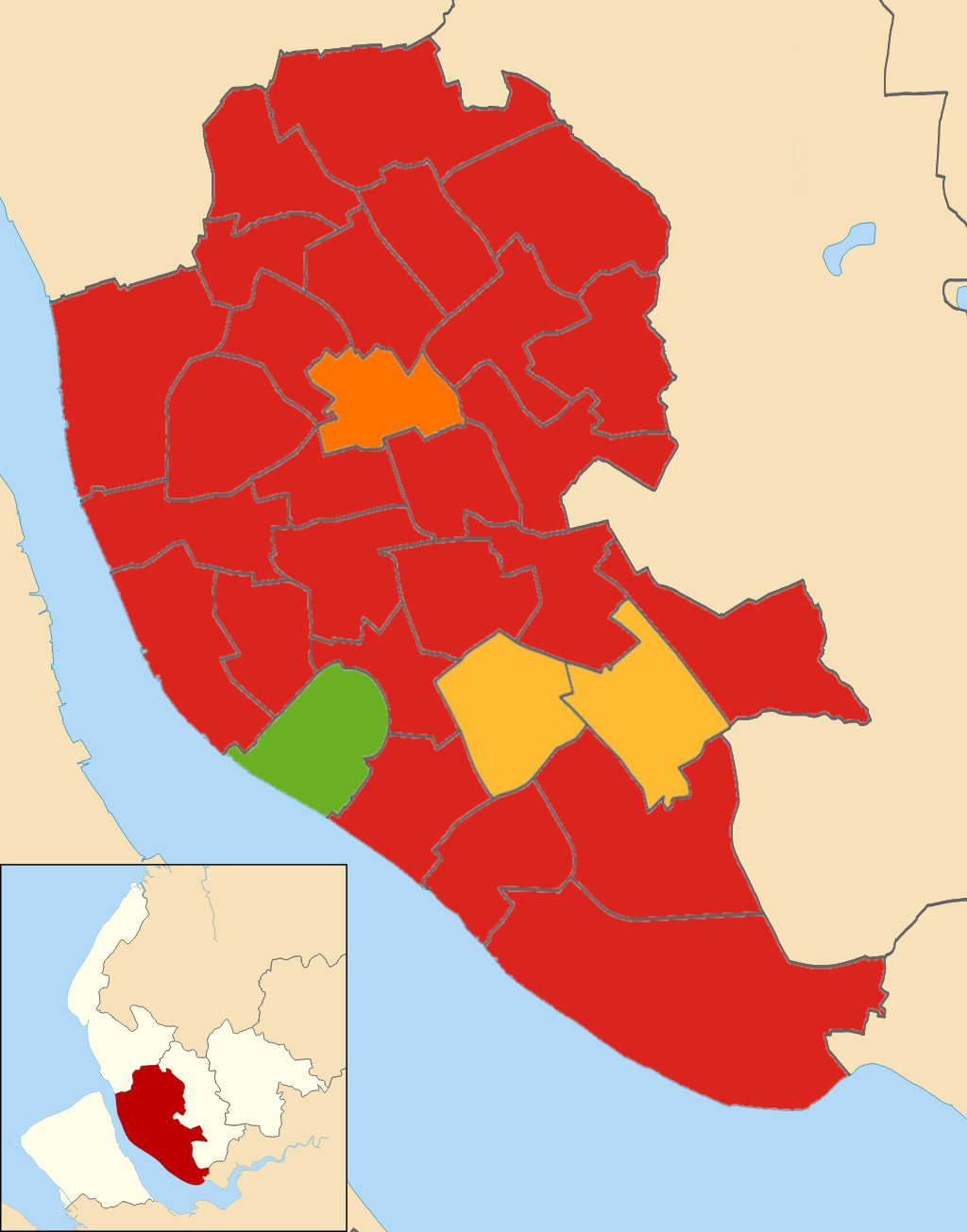
2011 local election results in Liverpool

The Liverpool Council election, 2011 to the city of Liverpool council happened on the same day as the 2011 United Kingdom local elections and the 2011 United Kingdom Alternative Vote referendum on 5 May.

Councillors elected at the 2007 Liverpool Council election defended their seats this year.

Following the election the composition of the council was:

Party	Seats	±
Labour	59	+11
Liberal Democrat	26	-11
Liberal	3	0
Green	2	0

== Election result ==
Liverpool City Council Election, 2011
Party	Seats	Gains	Losses	Net gain/loss	Seats %	Votes %	Votes	+/−
Labour	26	12	0	+12	86.66%	63.17%	72,281	+25.9%
Liberal Democrats	2	0	12	-12	6.66%	18.16%	20,780	-23.23%
Green	1	0	0	0	3.33%	5.96%	6,815	-0.22%
Liberal	1	0	0	0	3.33%	4.08%	4,674	-2.14%
Conservative	0	0	0	0	0	6.01%	6,876	+0.31%
UKIP	0	0	0	0	0	1.18%	1,345	+0.18%
TUSC	0	0	0	0	0	0.50%	572	
BNP	0	0	0	0	0	0.30%	339	
Socialist Labour	0	0	0	0	0	0.29%	328	
English Democrat	0	0	0	0	0	0.20%	225	
Independent	0	0	0	0	0	0.13%	146	
Respect	0	0	0	0	0	0.04%	51	

== Ward results ==
* – Councillor seeking re-election

=== Allerton & Hunt Cross ===
Allerton & Hunts Cross
Party	Candidate	Votes	%	±%
Labour	Ian Jobling	2,572	55.2	+34.8
Liberal Democrats	John Clucas *	1,245	26.7	−25.6
Conservative	Jade Adamowicz	376	8.07	−10.0
UKIP	Michelle Long	200	4.29	N/A
Green	Maggi Williams	135	2.9	−2.2
Liberal	Chris Hulme	134	2.9	−1.3
Majority		1,327	28.46	
Registered electors		10,958		
Turnout		4,662	42.54	
Rejected ballots		19		
Labour gain from Liberal Democrats		Swing		

=== Anfield ===
Anfield
Party	Candidate	Votes	%	±%
Labour	Adele Dowling	2,223	69.5	+34.5
Liberal Democrats	Jimmy Kendrick *	643	20.1	−29.5
BNP	Karen Otty	105	3.28	N/A
Conservative	Victoria McDonald	94	2.9	−0.7
Liberal	James Richardson	83	2.6	−6.3
Green	Jean Hill	50	1.6	−2.0
Majority		1,580		
Registered electors		9,320		
Turnout		3,198	34.3	
Rejected ballots		18		
Labour gain from Liberal Democrats		Swing		

=== Belle Vale ===
Belle Vale
Party	Candidate	Votes	%	±%
Labour	Janet Kent *	3,147	81.5	+35.1
Liberal Democrats	Michael Marner	360	9.3	−33.3
Conservative	Paul Barber	182	4.7	+1.4
Green	Julie Birch-Holt	172	4.5	+2.3
Majority		2,787	72.2	
Registered electors		10,828		
Turnout		3861	35.7	
Rejected ballots		30		
Labour hold		Swing	+34.2	

=== Central ===
Central
Party	Candidate	Votes	%	±%
Labour	Sharon Sullivan *	1,348	70.4	+20.3
Green	Fiona Coyne	178	9.3	+0.5
Conservative	Lee Berry	161	8.4	+0.0
Liberal Democrats	Daniel Bradley	144	7.5	−22.9
English Democrat	Steven Greenhalgh	83	4.3	N/A
Majority		1,204		
Registered electors		12,408		
Turnout		1,914	15.4	
Rejected ballots		21		
Labour hold		Swing		

=== Childwall ===
Childwall
Party	Candidate	Votes	%	±%
Labour	Jeremy Wolfson	2,616	55.1	+37.4
Liberal Democrats	Pamela Clein *	1,469	30.9	−22.8
Conservative	James Rogers	437	9.2	−3.2
Green	Pierre Vandervorst	155	3.3	−1.9
Liberal	Andrew Sharkey	71	1.5	−2.0
Majority		1,147		
Registered electors		11,067		
Turnout		4,748	42.9	
Rejected ballots		20		
Labour gain from Liberal Democrats		Swing	+30.1	

=== Church ===
Church
Party	Candidate	Votes	%	±%
Liberal Democrats	Richard Kemp *	2,091	41.9	−27.9
Labour	Nathalie Nicholas	1,852	37.1	+25.6
Conservative	Tom Roberts	501	10.0	+1.7
Green	Eleanor Martin	399	8.0	−0.2
Liverpool Independent Party	Jeff Berman	146	2.93	N/A
Majority		239		
Registered electors		10,632		
Turnout		4,989	46.9%	
Rejected ballots		33		
Liberal Democrats hold		Swing	-26.8	

=== Clubmoor ===
Clubmoor
Party	Candidate	Votes	%	±%
Labour	Irene Rainey *	2,904	80.4	+32.0
Liberal Democrats	Michelle Kelley	232	6.4	N/A
Liberal	James Gaskell	166	4.6	−30.8
Conservative	George Powell	184	5.1	−0.1
Green	William Major	125	3.5	+0.0
Majority		2,672		
Registered electors		10,911		
Turnout		3,611	33.10%	
Rejected ballots		37		
Labour hold		Swing		

=== County ===
County
Party	Candidate	Votes	%	±%
Labour	Roy Gladden	2,330	73.7	+41.1
Liberal Democrats	Karen Afford *	475	15.0	−43.5
UKIP	Tom Bodcock	138	4.4	−0.2
TUSC	Roger Bannister	78	2.5	N/A
Conservative	John Watson	61	1.9	−0.5
Green	Tony Jones	53	1.7	N/A
Liberal	Stephen Houghland	27	0.9	−1.1
Majority		1,855		
Registered electors		9,505		
Turnout		3,024	32%	
Rejected ballots		15		
Labour gain from Liberal Democrats		Swing		

=== Cressington ===
Cressington
Party	Candidate	Votes	%	±%
Labour	Bill Jones	2,879	53.5	+35.5
Liberal Democrats	Peter Millea *	1,468	27.3	−30.5
Conservative	Paul Athans	517	9.6	−1.1
Green	Mark Bowman	252	4.7	+0.1
UKIP	Mike Lane	181	3.4	N/A
Liberal	Russell Jamieson	81	1.5	N/A
Majority		1,411		
Registered electors		11,270		
Turnout		5,378	48%	
Rejected ballots		23		
Labour gain from Liberal Democrats		Swing		

=== Croxteth ===
Croxteth
Party	Candidate	Votes	%	±%
Labour	Stephen Till	2,181	68.6	+23.4
Liberal Democrats	Mark Anthony Coughlin ^{(PARTY)}	550	17.3	−28.3
Socialist Labour	Kai Andersen	158	5.0	N/A
Conservative	Brenda Coppell	125	3.9	+0.6
Liberal	John McBride	66	2.1	+0.7
Green	Donald Ross	57	1.8	−2.6
BNP	Peter Quiggins	44	1.4	N/A
Majority		1,631		
Registered electors		10,468		
Turnout		3,181	30%	
Rejected ballots		14		
Labour gain from Liberal Democrats		Swing		

=== Everton ===
Everton
Party	Candidate	Votes	%	±%
Labour	Jane Corbett *	2,562	85.6	+11.9
Conservative	Harry Fraser	127	4.2	−0.4
BNP	Dennis Leary	126	4.2	−2.6
Green	Raphael Levy	100	3.3	N/A
Liberal	Linda Roberts	79	2.6	−2.1
Majority		2,435		
Registered electors		9,698		
Turnout		2,994	31%	
Rejected ballots		26		
Labour hold		Swing		

=== Fazakerley ===
Fazakerley
Party	Candidate	Votes	%	±%
Labour	Peter Clarke ^{(PARTY)}	2,831	78.6	+25.9
Liberal Democrats	Graham Seddon	412	11.4	−22.3
Conservative	Stephen Fitzsimmons	164	4.6	+2.4
Green	Violaine See	123	3.4	+1.5
Liberal	Charles Mayes	73	2.0	N/A
Majority		2,419		
Registered electors		11,112		
Turnout		3,603	32%	
Rejected ballots		22		
Labour hold		Swing		

=== Greenbank ===
Greenbank
Party	Candidate	Votes	%	±%
Labour	Laura Robertson-Collins	2,085	55.9	+32.3
Liberal Democrats	Paul Clein *	853	22.9	−27.2
Green	Lawrence Brown	458	12.3	−4.7
Conservative	Chris Hall	224	6.0	−1.0
UKIP	Joseph Chiffers	69	1.9	N/A
Liberal	Damian Daly	42	1.1	−1.2
Majority		1,232		
Registered electors		10,208		
Turnout		1,232	37%	
Rejected ballots		21		
Labour gain from Liberal Democrats		Swing		

=== Kensington & Fairfield ===
Kensington & Fairfield
Party	Candidate	Votes	%	±%
Labour	Wendy Simon *	2,228	76.3	+30.6
UKIP	Frank Dunne	177	6.1	N/A
Liberal Democrats	Kevin White	176	6.0	−37.8
Liberal	John McNulty	146	5.0	N/A
Green	Esther Cosslett	108	3.7	−1.0
Conservative	Andy Carpenter	85	2.9	+0.7
Majority		2,052		
Registered electors		8,753		
Turnout		2,052	33%	
Rejected ballots		22		
Labour hold		Swing		

=== Kirkdale ===
Kirkdale
Party	Candidate	Votes	%	±%
Labour	Beatrice Fraenkel ^{(PARTY)}	3,001	86.4	+11.9
TUSC	Jo McNeill	162	4.7	N/A
Conservative	David Jeffery	128	3.7	+1.1
Green	Jonathan Clatworthy	106	3.1	−0.1
Liberal	Irene Mayes	78	2.2	+0.8
Majority		2,839		
Registered electors		11,268		
Turnout		33,475	33%	
Rejected ballots		31		
Labour hold		Swing		

=== Knotty Ash ===
Knotty Ash
Party	Candidate	Votes	%	±%
Labour	Hayley Todd	2,442	58.6	+18.5
Liberal Democrats	Paul Twigger *	1,439	34.5	−16.7
Conservative	James Ellis	144	3.5	+0.2
Green	Theresa Larkins	89	2.1	−0.4
Liberal	Marjorie Peel	57	1.4	−1.6
Majority		1,003		
Registered electors		9,829		
Turnout		4,171	42%	
Rejected ballots		23		
Labour gain from Liberal Democrats		Swing		

=== Mossley Hill ===
Mossley Hill
Party	Candidate	Votes	%	±%
Labour	Patrick Hurley	2,187	48.1	+31.6
Liberal Democrats	Ron Gould *	1,429	31.4	−31.1
Conservative	Giselle McDonald	488	10.7	+2.6
Green	Heather Brown	386	8.5	−2.1
Liberal	David Wood	56	1.2	−1.2
Majority		758		
Registered electors		10,545		
Turnout		4,546	43%	
Rejected ballots		19		
Labour gain from Liberal Democrats		Swing		

=== Norris Green ===
Norris Green
Party	Candidate	Votes	%	±%
Labour	Alan Walker *	2,796	89.2	+25.6
Conservative	Gillian Ferrigno	125	4.0	−0.8
Liberal	Patricia Elmour	118	3.8	+0.3
Green	Elspeth Anwar	94	3.0	+0.7
Majority		2,671		
Registered electors		10,004		
Turnout		3,133	31%	
Rejected ballots				
Rejected ballots		24		
Labour hold		Swing		

=== Old Swan ===
Old Swan
Party	Candidate	Votes	%	±%
Labour	Peter Brennan	2,689	65.5	+42.1
Liberal Democrats	Berni Turner *	751	18.3	−46.3
UKIP	Tony Hammond	202	4.9	N/A
Conservative	Norman Coppell	118	2.8	−0.8
Liberal	Mary-Jane Canning	116	2.8	−1.8
Green	Vikki Gregorich	97	2.4	+1.4
TUSC	John Ralph	74	1.8	N/A
English Democrat	Steve McEllenborough	58	1.4	N/A
Majority		1,938		
Registered electors		11,106		
Turnout		3,973	36%	
Rejected ballots		19		
Labour gain from Liberal Democrats		Swing		

=== Picton ===
Picton
Party	Candidate	Votes	%	±%
Labour	Abdul Basit Qadir	2,059	62.2	+32.9
Liberal Democrats	Laurence Sidorczuk ^{(PARTY)}	751	22.7	−30.7
Green	Jennifer Geddes	254	7.7	+2.9
Liberal	Griffith Parry	150	4.5	−5.1
Conservative	Patricia Waddington	97	2.9	−0.1
Majority		1,308		
Registered electors		10,577		
Turnout		3,311	31%	
Rejected ballots		42		
Labour gain from Liberal Democrats		Swing		

=== Prince's Park ===
Prince's Park
Party	Candidate	Votes	%	±%
Labour	Alan Dean *	2,263	72.2	+21.2
Green	Lewis Coyne	355	11.3	−2.7
Liberal Democrats	Nazrul Islam	214	6.8	−17.8
Conservative	Gwynneth Hicklin	141	4.5	−1.3
TUSC	Paul Humphreys	104	3.3	N/A
Majority		2,049		
Registered electors		9,512		
Turnout		3,134	33%	
Rejected ballots		18		
Labour hold		Swing		

=== Riverside ===
Riverside
Party	Candidate	Votes	%	±%
Labour	Paul Brant *	2,836	79.9	+10.5
Conservative	Alma McGing	201	5.6	−4.4
Liberal Democrats	Kathryn Dadswell	198	5.6	−4.8
Green	Peter Cranie	196	5.5	−2.1
TUSC	Darren Ireland	88	2.5	N/A
Liberal	Michael Morgan	30	0.9	−1.7
Majority		2.638		
Registered electors		11,339		
Turnout		3,549	31%	
Rejected ballots		24		
Labour hold		Swing		

=== St Michael's ===
St. Michael's
Party	Candidate	Votes	%	±%
Green	John Coyne *	1,978	50.5	+12.5
Labour	Phil Molyneux	1,341	34.2	+8.3
Liberal Democrats	Linda Farrelly	326	8.3	−20.9
Conservative	David Patmore	143	3.7	−0.9
UKIP	Paul Rimmer	70	1.8	N/A
Liberal	Terence Formby	31	0.8	−1.5
English Democrat	Neil Kenny	29	0.7	N/A
Majority		637		
Registered electors		9,741		
Turnout		3,819	39%	
Rejected ballots		18		
Green hold		Swing		

=== Speke-Garston ===
Speke-Garston
Party	Candidate	Votes	%	±%
Labour	Mary Rasmussen *	3,167	82.2	+24.0
Liberal Democrats	Philip Wren	244	6.3	−24.7
Green	Helen Randall	168	4.4	+2.1
Conservative	Nigel Barber	141	3.7	+1.2
Liberal	John Pagan	133	3.5	N/A
Majority		2,923		
Registered electors		12,700		
Turnout		3,853	30%	
Rejected ballots		39		
Labour hold		Swing		

=== Tuebrook & Stoneycroft ===
Tuebrook and Stoneycroft
Party	Candidate	Votes	%	±%
Liberal	Hazel Williams *	2,415	63.8	−2.1
Labour	Matt Shiel	1,114	29.4	+8.8
Green	Natalie Clark	76	2.0	−1.5
Liberal Democrats	Paula Birkitt	68	1.8	−4.2
BNP	Phillip Mariott	64	1.7	−2.3
Conservative	Gabby Saul	48	1.3	N/A
Majority		1,301		
Registered electors		10,430		
Turnout		3,785	36%	
Rejected ballots		12		
Liberal hold		Swing	-5.5	

=== Warbreck ===
Warbreck
Party	Candidate	Votes	%	±%
Labour	Ann O'Byrne *	3,190	81.5	+32.8
Liberal Democrats	Richard Roberts	337	8.6	−34.9
UKIP	Enid Lindsay	124	3.2	N/A
Conservative	Arron Poole	110	2.8	+1.1
Liberal	George Blacklock Roberts	66	1.7	N/A
English Democrat	Lee Walton	55	1.4	N/A
Green	Ellie Pontin	34	0.9	−0.4
Majority		2,853		
Registered electors		11,216		
Turnout		3,792	34%	
Rejected ballots		18		
Labour hold		Swing		

=== Wavertree ===
Wavertree
Party	Candidate	Votes	%	±%
Labour	Jake Morrison	2,337	51.3	+34.6
Liberal Democrats	Mike Storey *	1,444	31.7	−38.3
Green	Elizabeth Pascoe	275	6.0	−0.5
UKIP	Neil Miney	184	4.0	N/A
Liberal	Sean Keatley	138	3.0	+0.3
Conservative	Angela Oates	129	2.8	+1.3
Respect	Diana Raby	51	1.1	N/A
Majority		893	19.6	
Registered electors		10,210		
Turnout		4,558	45%	
Rejected ballots		28		
Labour gain from Liberal Democrats		Swing		

=== West Derby ===
West Derby
Party	Candidate	Votes	%	±%
Labour	Daniel Barrington	2,770	59.8	+35.8
Liberal Democrats	Norman Mills *	1,261	27.2	−28.2
Conservative	Diane Watson	232	5.0	−3.3
Liberal	Ann Hines	209	4.5	−2.1
Green	Martin Randall	102	2.2	−3.5
Socialist Labour	Kim Singleton	61	1.3	N/A
Majority		1,509		
Registered electors		10,997		
Turnout		4,635	42%	
Rejected ballots		14		
Labour gain from Liberal Democrats		Swing		

=== Woolton ===
Woolton
Party	Candidate	Votes	%	±%
Liberal Democrats	Barbara Mace *	1,763	37.5	−19.8
Labour	Mary Aspinall	1,522	32.4	+18.5
Conservative	Adam Marsden	1,154	24.5	+3.4
Green	Alexander Rudkin	156	3.3	−0.9
Liberal	Maria Langley	109	2.3	−1.1
Majority		241		
Registered electors		10,390		
Turnout		4,704	45%	
Rejected ballots		21		
Liberal Democrats hold		Swing	-19.2	

=== Yew Tree ===
Yew Tree
Party	Candidate	Votes	%	±%
Labour	Barbara Ann Murray *	2,779	74.8	+26.2
Liberal Democrats	Elizabeth Parr	437	11.8	−25.7
Conservative	Anna Senior	239	6.4	+0.9
Socialist Labour	Barbara Bryan	109	2.9	N/A
Green	William Ward	84	2.3	−0.7
TUSC	Charley Cosgrove	66	1.8	N/A
Majority		2,342		
Registered electors		11,184		
Turnout		3,714	33%	
Rejected ballots		14		
Labour gain from Liberal Democrats		Swing		
