= Yew Tree (Liverpool ward) =

Metropolitan Borough Council ward in Liverpool, England

Coordinates: 53.429°N 2.871°W

Yew Tree Dovecot (1953 - 2003)
- Yew Tree ward within Liverpool
- Population: 11,240 (2021 census)
- Registered Electors: 7,873 (2023 election)
- Metropolitan borough: City of Liverpool
- Metropolitan county: Merseyside
- Region: North West
- Country: England
- Sovereign state: United Kingdom
- UK Parliament: Liverpool West Derby
- Councillors: Dan Barrington (Labour Party); Barbara Murray (Labour Party)

Yew Tree ward is an electoral division of Liverpool City Council within the Liverpool West Derby Parliamentary constituency.

== Background ==
The ward was created as Dovecot ward in 1953; its boundaries were changed in 1980 and in 2004 when its name changed to Yew Tree ward. Its boundaries were changed again for the 2023 elections.

=== 1953 boundaries ===
1953 boundaries

The ward was part of the Liverpool West Derby Parliamentary constituency.

=== 1973 election ===
1973 boundaries

Following the Local Government Act 1972 the ward boundaries of the council were altered. The number of wards was reduced from 40 to 33 and the aldermanic system was abolished. Dovecot was retained and returned three councillors.

=== 1980 boundaries ===
1980 boundaries

A report of the Local Government Boundary Commission for England published in November 1978 set out proposals for changes to the wards of Liverpool City Council, maintaining the number of councillors at 99 representing 33 wards. Dovecot ward was retained to be represented by three councillors.

The report describes the boundaries of Dovecot ward as "Commencing at a point where the eastern boundary of the City meets Aldwark Road, thence generally northwestwards along said road to Grovehurst Avenue, thence northwestwards along said avenue, and in prolongation thereof crossing Dovecot Place to East Prescot Road, thence southwestwards along said road and northwestwards along the northern part of said road to Kingsheath Avenue, northeastwards along said avenue to Elgar Road, thence northwestwards along said road and in prolongation thereof to Deys Brook, thence northwards and generally northwestwards along said brook to a point opposite the southeastern corner of St Vincent's School for the Blind, thence eastwards to and northwestwards along the northeastern boundary of said school and continuing northwestwards along the western boundary of Yewtree Playing Fields to Yew Tree Lane, thence southwestwards along said lane to the eastern boundary of Croxteth Ward, thence northwestwards and northeastwards along said boundary to the southwestern boundary of Gillmoss Ward, thence southeastwards along said boundary and generally southwards along the eastern boundary of the City to the point of commencement".

The ward was part of the Liverpool West Derby Parliamentary constituency.

=== 2004 boundaries ===
2004 ward boundaries

A review by the Boundary Committee for England recommended that the council was formed of a reduced number of 90 members elected from 30 wards. Dovecot ward was dissolved and distributed into the new Yew Tree ward, with a small part going into the new Knotty Ash ward. The new ward gained parts of the former Broadgreen, Croxteth, and Gillmosswards.

The ward boundaries follow the city boundary to East Prescot Road, Youens Way, around the Bradbury Centre and Broughton Hall High School, Yew Tree Lane, Leyfield Road, Deysbrook Lane, Crown Road, Melwood Drive, Croxteth Hall Lane, and the southern boundary of Croxteth Park.

The population of the ward taken at the 2011 census was 16,746, and at the 2021 census was 16,772.

=== 2023 boundaries ===
The ward boundaries were changed in 2023 following a review by the Local Government Boundary Commission for England which decided that the existing 30 wards each represented by three Councillors should be replaced by 64 wards represented by 85 councillors with varying representation by one, two or three councillors per ward. The Yew Tree ward was retained as a two-member ward taking most of the former ward which lost its north-west corner to the new West Derby Deysbrook ward and a small portion to the new West Derby Leyfield ward.

The population of the ward at the 2021 census was 11,240.

== Councillors ==
The ward has returned seven Councillors

Election	Councillor	Councillor	Councillor
2004	Roger Johnston (LD)	Graham Hulme (LD)	Robert Ousby (LD)
2006	Roger Johnston (LD)	Graham Hulme (LD)	Robert Ousby (LD)
2007	Roger Johnston (LD)	Barbara Murray (Lab)	Robert Ousby (LD)
2008	Roger Johnston (LD)	Barbara Murray (Lab)	John Prince (Lab)
2010	Tony Concepcion (Lab)	Barbara Murray (Lab)	John Prince (Lab)
2011	Tony Concepcion (Lab)	Barbara Murray (Lab)	John Prince (Lab)
2012	Tony Concepcion (Lab)	Barbara Murray (Lab)	John Prince (Lab)
2014	Tony Concepcion (Lab)	Barbara Murray (Lab)	John Prince (Lab)
2015	Tony Concepcion (Lab)	Barbara Murray (Lab)	John Prince (Lab)
2016	Tony Concepcion (Lab)	Barbara Murray (Lab)	John Prince (Lab)
2018	Tony Concepcion (Lab)	Barbara Murray (Lab)	John Prince (Lab)
2019	Tony Concepcion (Lab)	Barbara Murray (Lab)	John Prince (Lab)
2021	Tony Concepcion (Lab)	Barbara Murray (Lab)	John Prince (Lab)
WARD REFORMED
2023	Dan Barrington (Lab)	Barbara Murray (Lab)	

== Election results ==
=== Elections of the 2020s ===
4 May 2023
Party	Candidate	Votes	%	±%
**Labour**	**Daniel Barrington (Note: Dan Barrington was a re-standing councillor for the former West Derby ward.)**	**1,191**	**36.95**	
**Labour**	**Barbara Murray (Note: Barbara Murray was a re-standing councillor for the former Yew Tree ward.)**	**1,045**	**32.42**	
Independent	Pat Rimmer	282	8.75	
Independent	Catherine Elizabeth Doyle	252	7.82	
Liberal Democrats	Eddie Clein	174	5.40	
Green	William Ward	166	5.15	
Conservative	David Patmore	113	3.51	
Majority		909		
Turnout				
Rejected ballots		6		
Total ballots				
Registered electors		7,873		
Labour **win** (new seat)				
Labour **win** (new seat)				

6 May 2021
Party	Candidate	Votes	%	±%
**Labour**	**John Prince**	**1,995**	**67.06**	**▼7.87**
Conservative	Michael Borman	270	9.08	▲3.64
Green	William Ward	248	8.34	▲0.15
Liberal Democrats	Alix Joel Roper	244	8.20	▲2.32
Liberal	Sam Hawksford	218	7.33	▲1.78
Majority		1,725	37.98	▼8.76
Turnout		2,975	25.20	▲2.29
Registered electors		11,805		
Rejected ballots		62	2.04	▲0.86
Labour **hold**		Swing	-5.76	

=== Elections of the 2010s ===
2 May 2019
Party	Candidate	Votes	%	±%
**Labour**	**Barbara Murray**	**2,012**	**74.93**	**▼6.40**
Green	Will Ward	220	8.19	▲5.06
Liberal Democrats	Jacqueline Wilson	158	5.88	▲1.94
Liberal	Sam Hawksford	149	5.55	▲2.18
Conservative	Gillian Michelle Ferrigno	146	5.44	▼2.78
Majority		1,792	66.74	▼6.37
Turnout		2,685	22.91	▼2.27
Registered electors		11,719		
Rejected ballots		32	1.18	▲0.94
Labour **hold**		Swing	-5.73	

Liverpool City Council Municipal Elections: 3rd May 2018
Party	Candidate	Votes	%	±%
Labour	**Tony Concepcion**	2,414	81.33%	▲7.80
Conservative	Gillian Michelle Ferrigno	244	8.22	▲1.76
Liberal Democrats	Jacqueline Elaine Wilson	117	3.94%	▼1.50
Liberal	Sam Hawksford	100	3.37%	▼0.93
Green	Will Ward	93	3.13%	▼1.53
Majority		2,170	73.11%	▲6.04
Turnout		2,975	25.18%	▼1.52
Registered electors		11,816		
Rejected ballots		7	0.24%	▼1.31
Labour **hold**		Swing	▲3.02	

Liverpool City Council Municipal Elections: 5th May 2016
Party	Candidate	Votes	%	±%
Labour	**John Philip Prince**	2,242	73.53%	▼1.74
Conservative	Robert Leslie Albert Poynton	197	6.46	▲0.96
TUSC	Charley Cosgrove	171	5.61%	▲3.92
Liberal Democrats	David Newman	166	5.44%	▲1.53
Green	Will Ward	142	4.66%	▲1.33
Liberal	Sam Hawksford	131	4.30%	▲3.33
Majority		2,045	67.07%	▼3.69
Turnout		3,097	26.70%	▼35.70
Registered electors		11,599		
Rejected ballots		48	1.55%	▲1.03
Labour **hold**		Swing	▼1.35	

Liverpool City Council Municipal Elections: 7th May 2015
Party	Candidate	Votes	%	±%
Labour	**Barbara Murray**	5,511	75.27%	▼3.37
UKIP	Ian Joseph Hanmer	683	9.33%	N/A
Conservative	Patricia Anita Waddington	403	5.50%	▼1.74
Liberal Democrats	Angela Hulme	286	3.91%	N/A
Green	Russ Thornton	244	3.33%	▼4.55
TUSC	Charley Cosgrove	124	1.69%	N/A
Liberal	Sam Hawksford	71	0.97%	▼5.27
Majority		4,828	65.94%	▼4.82
Turnout		7,360	62.72%	▲34.14
Registered electors		11,734		
Rejected ballots		38	0.52%	
Labour **hold**		Swing	-	

Liverpool City Council Municipal Elections: 22nd May 2014
Party	Candidate	Votes	%	±%
Labour	**Tony Concepcion**	2596	78.64%	+1.82%
Green	Will Ward	260	7.88%	+4.89%
Conservative	Pat Waddington	239	7.24%	+2.33%
Liberal	Tracey Hawksford	206	6.24%	+3.31%
Majority		2,336	70.76%	+2.30%
Turnout		3301	28.58%	−0.48%
Labour **hold**		Swing	-1.54%	

Liverpool City Council Municipal Elections 2012: 3rd May 2012
Party	Candidate	Votes	%	±%
Labour	**John Prince**	2489	76.82%	
Liberal Democrats	Peter Allen	271	8.36%	
Conservative	Patricia Waddington	159	4.91%	
TUSC	Charlotte Cosgrove	129	3.98%	
Green	William Ward	97	2.99%	
Liberal	Sam Hawksford	95	2.93%	
Majority		2218	68.46%	
Turnout		3240	29.06%	
Labour **hold**		Swing		

Liverpool City Council Municipal Elections 2011: 5th May 2011
Party	Candidate	Votes	%	±%
Labour	**Barbara Ann Murray**	**2779**	**74.82%**	**+18.03%**
Liberal Democrats	Elizabeth Parr	437	11.77%	−16.29%
Conservative	Anna Senior	239	6.44%	−0.62%
Socialist Labour	Barbara Bryan	109	2.93%	+0.87%
Green	William Ward	84	2.26%	+0.41%
TUSC	Charlotte Cosgrove	66	1.78%	n/a
Majority		2342	63.06%	+34.34%
Turnout		3714	33.21%	−22.95%
Labour **hold**		Swing	+26.18%	

Liverpool City Council Municipal Elections 2010: Yew Tree
Party	Candidate	Votes	%	±%
Labour	**Tony Concepcion**	**3618**	**56.79%**	**+7.37%**
Liberal Democrats	Gary John Airey	1788	28.06%	−1.52%
Conservative	Matthew Thomas Peter Taylor	450	7.06%	−5.39%
Liberal	Tracey Hawksford	266	4.18%	+0.14%
Socialist Labour	Barbara Bryan	131	2.06%	n/a
Green	William Ward	118	1.85%	−2.66
Majority		1830	28.72%	
Turnout		6371	56.16%	+31.35%
Labour **gain** from Liberal Democrats		Swing	+4.45%	

=== Elections of the 2000s ===
Liverpool City Council Municipal Elections 2008: Yew Tree
Party	Candidate	Votes	%	±%
Labour	**John Philip Prince**	**1370**	**49.42%**	
Liberal Democrats	Gary John Airey	820	29.58%	
Conservative	June Hilda Brandwood	345	12.45%	
Green	Peter Cranie	125	4.51%	
Liberal	Tracey Hawksford	112	4.04%	
Majority				
Turnout		2772	24.81%	
Labour **gain** from Liberal Democrats		Swing		

Liverpool City Council Municipal Elections 2007: Yew Tree
Party	Candidate	Votes	%	±%
Labour	**Barbara Ann Murray**	**1426**	**48.60%**	
Liberal Democrats	Graham Hulme	1101	37.53%	
Conservative	June Hilda Brandwood	160	5.45%	
Liberal	Sam Hawksford	156	5.32%	
Green	Stephen Thomas Clatworthy	91	3.10%	
Majority				
Turnout		2934	26.29%	
Labour **gain** from Liberal Democrats		Swing		

Liverpool City Council Municipal Elections 2006: Yew Tree
Party	Candidate	Votes	%	±%
Liberal Democrats	**Roger Johnston**	**1089**	**42.42%**	
Labour	Barbara Ann Murray	1076	41.92%	
Conservative	Brian James Jones	205	7.99%	
Liberal	Tracey Hawksford	197	7.67%	
Majority				
Turnout		2567	22.74%	
Liberal Democrats **hold**		Swing		

After the boundary change of 2004 the whole of Liverpool City Council faced election. Three Councillors were returned at this election.

Liverpool City Council Municipal Elections 2004: Yew Tree
Party	Candidate	Votes	%	±%
Liberal Democrats	Robert Ousby	1636		
Liberal Democrats	Graham Hulme	1582		
Liberal Democrats	Roger Johnston	1469		
Labour	Peter Holden	1160		
Labour	Barbara Murray	1023		
Labour	John Prince	1001		
Liberal	Kevin Buchanan	311		
Conservative	Brian Jones	242		
Liberal	Deborah Mayes	213		
Liberal	Tracey Hawksford	205		
Socialist Labour	Thomas McKay	82		
Majority				
Turnout		3542	31.53%	
Liberal Democrats **hold**		Swing	n/a	

• italics denotes the sitting Councillor • bold denotes the winning candidate
