= Central (Liverpool ward) =

Metropolitan borough council ward in Liverpool, England

Coordinates: 53.410°N 2.980°W

- Central ward within Liverpool
- Area: 3.468 km^{2} (1.339 sq mi)
- Population: 24,849 (2021 census)
  - Density: 7,165/km^{2} (18,560/sq mi)
- Registered Electors: 13,104 (2021 election)
- Metropolitan borough: City of Liverpool
- Metropolitan county: Merseyside
- Region: North West
- Country: England
- Sovereign state: United Kingdom
- UK Parliament: Liverpool Riverside

Central was an electoral division of Liverpool City Council in the Liverpool Riverside Parliamentary constituency.

== Background ==
The ward was created for the 2004 municipal elections from the former Abercromby, Everton and Smithdown wards.

The ward boundaries followed the River Mersey, Princes Parade, William Jessop Way, Waterloo Road, Paisley Street, Great Howard Street, Leeds Street, Byrom Street, Hunter Street, Islington, Brunswick Road, Low Hill, Kensington, Jubilee Drive, Belltower Lane to behind Jubilee Drive, Edge Lane, Irvine Street, Mason Street, Grinfield Street, Smithdown Lane, Falkner Street, Grove Street, Myrtle Street, Hardman Street, Leece Street, Renshaw Street, Ranelagh Street, Hanover Street, Canning Place, Salthouse Quay, and Hartley Quay.

It contained the majority of the city centre but also includes Kensington Fields in the Kensington district to the east and the Marybone/Holy Cross community in the Vauxhall district. The ward includes the longstanding city centre community around the Bullring, as well as many new city centre apartments. Furthermore, the ward contains the Pier Head and the two larger universities; the University of Liverpool and Liverpool John Moores University.

The population at the 2011 census was 20,340, and at the 2021 census was 24,849.

In 2004 Central was the city's most marginal ward, largely due to the intervention of the hard left Liverpool Labour Community Party, however the ward solely returned Labour Party councillors. The May 2008 local elections saw Labour take 62% of the vote.

The 2011 vote was effected by the controversy involving the Liberal Democrat candidate, Daniel Bradley, who is the son of former Liverpool City Council Leader Warren Bradley, when Daniel disclosed that he had not signed the candidate paper which his father had witnessed.

Cllr Maria Toolan resigned from the Labour Party, weeks before the 2023 elections, after failing to be selected as a Labour candidate, and subsequently stood for the Liverpool Community Independents Party in City Centre North ward.

The ward was dissolved in 2023 and was distributed mostly into the City Centre North and Brownlow Hill wards, with parts in the Canning, City Centre South, Everton West Kensington & Fairfield and Waterfront South wards.

== Councillors ==
Election	Councillor	Councillor	Councillor
2004	Nick Small (Lab)	Sharon Sullivan (Lab)	Richard White (Lab)
2006	Nick Small (Lab)	Sharon Sullivan (Lab)	Richard White (Lab)
2007	Nick Small (Lab)	Sharon Sullivan (Lab)	Richard White (Lab)
2008	Nick Small (Lab)	Sharon Sullivan (Lab)	Christine Banks (Lab)
2010	Nick Small (Lab)	Sharon Sullivan (Lab)	Christine Banks (Lab)
2011	Nick Small (Lab)	Sharon Sullivan (Lab)	Christine Banks (Lab)
2012	Nick Small (Lab)	Sharon Sullivan (Lab)	Christine Banks (Lab)
2014	Nick Small (Lab)	Sharon Sullivan (Lab)	Christine Banks (Lab)
2015	Nick Small (Lab)	Sharon Sullivan (Lab)	Christine Banks (Lab)
2016	Nick Small (Lab)	Sharon Sullivan (Lab)	Christine Banks (Lab)
2018	Nick Small (Lab)	Sharon Sullivan (Lab)	Christine Banks (Lab)
2019	Nick Small (Lab)	Maria Toolan (Lab)	Christine Banks (Lab)
2021	Nick Small (Lab)	Maria Toolan (Lab)	Christine Banks (Lab)

indicates seat up for re-election after boundary changes.

indicates seat up for re-election.

indicates change in affiliation.

indicates seat up for re-election after casual vacancy.

== Election results ==
=== Elections of the 2020s ===
Liverpool City Council Municipal Elections 2021: 6th May 2021
Party	Candidate	Votes	%	±%
**Labour**	**Christine Banks**	**1,209**	**57.03**	**▼3.10**
Green	Martyn Paul Madeley	498	23.49	▲1.12
Liberal Democrats	Helen Margaret Dietz	194	9.15	▼0.32
Conservative	Katie Maria Burgess	135	6.37	▼0.27
SDP	Keenan Reece Clough	51	2.41	Steady
Liberal	Bethan Hazel Williams	33	1.56	▲0.18
Majority		711	33.54	▼4.22
Turnout		2,170	16.56	▲0.53
Registered electors		13,104		
Rejected ballots		50	2.30	▲1.26
Labour **hold**		Swing	-2.11	

=== Elections of the 2010s ===
Liverpool City Council Municipal Elections 2019: 2nd May 2019
Party	Candidate	Votes	%	±%
**Labour**	**Maria Toolan**	**914**	**60.13**	**▼7.81**
Green	Jayne Louise Stephanie Clough	340	22.37	▲10.77
Liberal Democrats	Sam Buist	144	9.47	▲1.89
Conservative	Lee David Berry	101	6.64	▼0.88
Liberal	Bethan Hazel Williams	21	1.38	n/a
Majority		574	37.76	▼18.58
Turnout		1,536	16.03	▼0.07
Registered electors		9,585		
Rejected ballots		16	1.04	▲0.85
Labour **hold**		Swing	-9.29	

Liverpool City Council Municipal Elections 2018: 3rd May 2018
Party	Candidate	Votes	%	±%
**Labour**	**Nick Small**	**1,066**	**67.94**	**▼1.57**
Green	Jayne Louise Stephanie Clough	182	11.60	▼4.73
Liberal Democrats	Greg Howard	119	7.58	▲2.14
Conservative	Lee David Berry	118	7.52	▲1.79
Independent	James Leadbeater	84	5.35	N/A
Majority		884	56.34	▼8.35
Turnout		1,572	16.10	▼8.46
Registered electors		9,766		
Rejected ballots		3	0.19	
Labour **hold**		Swing	1.58	

Liverpool City Council Municipal Elections 2016: 5th May 2016
Party	Candidate	Votes	%	±%
**Labour**	**Christine Banks**	**1,213**	**69.51**	**▲9.17**
Green	Robbie Coyne	285	16.33	▼3.04
Conservative	Lee David Berry	100	5.73	▼8.91
Liberal Democrats	Jacqueline Elaine Wilson	95	5.44	n/a
Liberal	James Robert Dykstra	52	2.98	n/a
Majority		928	53.18	▲12.21
Turnout		1,762	16.76	▼32.20
Labour **hold**		Swing	+6.11	

Liverpool City Council Municipal Elections 2015: 7th May 2015
Party	Candidate	Votes	%	±%
**Labour**	**Sharon Sullivan**	**3,128**	**60.34**	**▼2.77**
Green	Rachael Joanne Blackman	1,004	19.37	▲0.30
Conservative	Lee Berry	759	14.64	▲6.75
UKIP	Jamie Sanderson	199	3.84	▼3.94
TUSC	Priyanga Jeyanayagam	94	1.81	n/a
Majority		2,124	40.97	▼3.07
Turnout		5,181	48.96	▲35.1
Labour **hold**		Swing		

Liverpool City Council Municipal Elections 2014: 22nd May 2014
Party	Candidate	Votes	%	±%
**Labour**	**Nick Small**	**1,208**	**63.11**	**▼8.34**
Green	Hannah Ellen Clare	365	19.07	▲7.10
Conservative	Lee Berry	151	7.89	▲1.01
UKIP	Tony Power	149	7.78	n/a
Liberal	Michele Leigh Williams	41	2.14	▲0.62
Majority		843	44.04	▼14.83
Turnout		1,914	13.86	▲1.42
Labour **hold**		Swing	-7.72	

Liverpool City Council Municipal Elections 2012: 3rd May 2012
Party	Candidate	Votes	%	±%
**Labour**	**Christine Banks**	**1,164**	**71.45**	**▲1.02**
Green	Simeon Daniel Hart	195	11.97	▲2.67
Conservative	Lee David Berry	145	8.90	▲0.49
TUSC	Daren Andrew Ireland	80	4.91	n/a
Liberal	James Robert Dykstra	45	2.76	n/a
Majority		969	58.87	▼1.26
Turnout		1646	12.44	▼1.26
Labour **hold**		Swing	-0.83	

Liverpool City Council Municipal Elections 2011: 5th May 2011
Party	Candidate	Votes	%	±%
**Labour**	**Sharon Sullivan**	**1,348**	**70.43**	**▲17.61**
Green	Fiona Margaret McGill Coyne	178	9.30	▲3.21
Conservative	Lee David Berry	161	8.41	▼2.13
Liberal Democrats	Daniel Bradley	144	7.52	▼20.94
English Democrat	Steven Greenhalgh	83	4.34	n/a
Majority		1,170	60.13	▲35.78
Turnout		1,914	15.43	▼16.89
Labour **hold**		Swing	+19.28	

Liverpool City Council Municipal Elections 2010: Central
Party	Candidate	Votes	%	±%
**Labour**	**Nick Small**	**2,054**	**52.82**	
Liberal Democrats	Richard Marbrow	1,107	28.46	
Conservative	Thomas Roberts	410	10.54	
Green	Fiona Coyne	237	6.09	
Liberal	John Aaron Gannon	81	2.08	
Majority		947	24.35	
Turnout		3,889	32.32	
Labour **hold**		Swing		

=== Elections of the 2000s ===
Liverpool City Council Municipal Elections 2008: Central
Party	Candidate	Votes	%	±%
**Labour**	**Christine Banks**	**722**	**61.45**	
Liberal Democrats	James Peter Murray	157	13.36	
Green	Michael Sean Cotgreave	134	11.40	
Conservative	Gregg Andrew Watson	118	10.04	
Liberal	Lisa Gaskell	44	3.74	
Majority				
Turnout		1175	9.59	
Labour **hold**		Swing		

Liverpool City Council Municipal Elections 2007: Central
Party	Candidate	Votes	%	±%
**Labour**	**Sharon Sullivan**	**713**	**50.21**	
Liberal Democrats	Gary Millar	432	30.42	
Green	Robert Smith	125	8.80	
Conservative	Mark Andrew Cotterell	120	8.45	
Liberal	Lisa Gaskell	30	2.11	
Majority				
Turnout		1,420	11.80	
Labour **hold**		Swing		

Liverpool City Council Municipal Elections 2006: Central
Party	Candidate	Votes	%	±%
**Labour**	**Nick Small**	**719**	**53.30**	
Liberal Democrats	Paul Twigger	395	29.28	
Green	Peter Andrew Edward Cranie	104	7.71	
Conservative	Mark Andrew Cottrell	102	7.56	
Liberal	Karl Justin Prescott	29	2.15	
Majority				
Turnout		1,349	12.00	
Labour **hold**		Swing		

After the boundary change of 2004 the whole of Liverpool City Council faced election. Three Councillors were returned at this election.

Liverpool City Council Municipal Elections 2004: Central
Party	Candidate	Votes	%	±%
**Labour**	**Richard White**	**580**		
**Labour**	**Sharon Sullivan**	**577**		
**Labour**	**Nick Small**	**515**		
Liberal Democrats	Alison Campbell	497		
Liberal Democrats	David Roscoe	479		
Liberal Democrats	Christopher Curry	459		
Liverpool Labour	George Knibb	324		
Liverpool Labour	Marie Whitty	278		
Green	Faye Griffiths	223		
Green	Peter Cranie	191		
Green	Alexander Rodkin	141		
Conservative	Diane Watson	74		
Liberal	Stephen Houghland	28		
Majority				
Turnout		1649	16.13	
Labour **win** (new seat)				
Labour **win** (new seat)				
Labour **win** (new seat)				

• italics denotes the sitting Councillor • bold denotes the winning candidate
