= 2004 Liverpool City Council election =

2004 UK local government election

- 10 June 2004

90 seats were up for election: This was an all up election due to boundary changes including reducing the number of wards to 30. This election was exclusively postal votes. 46 seats needed for a majority

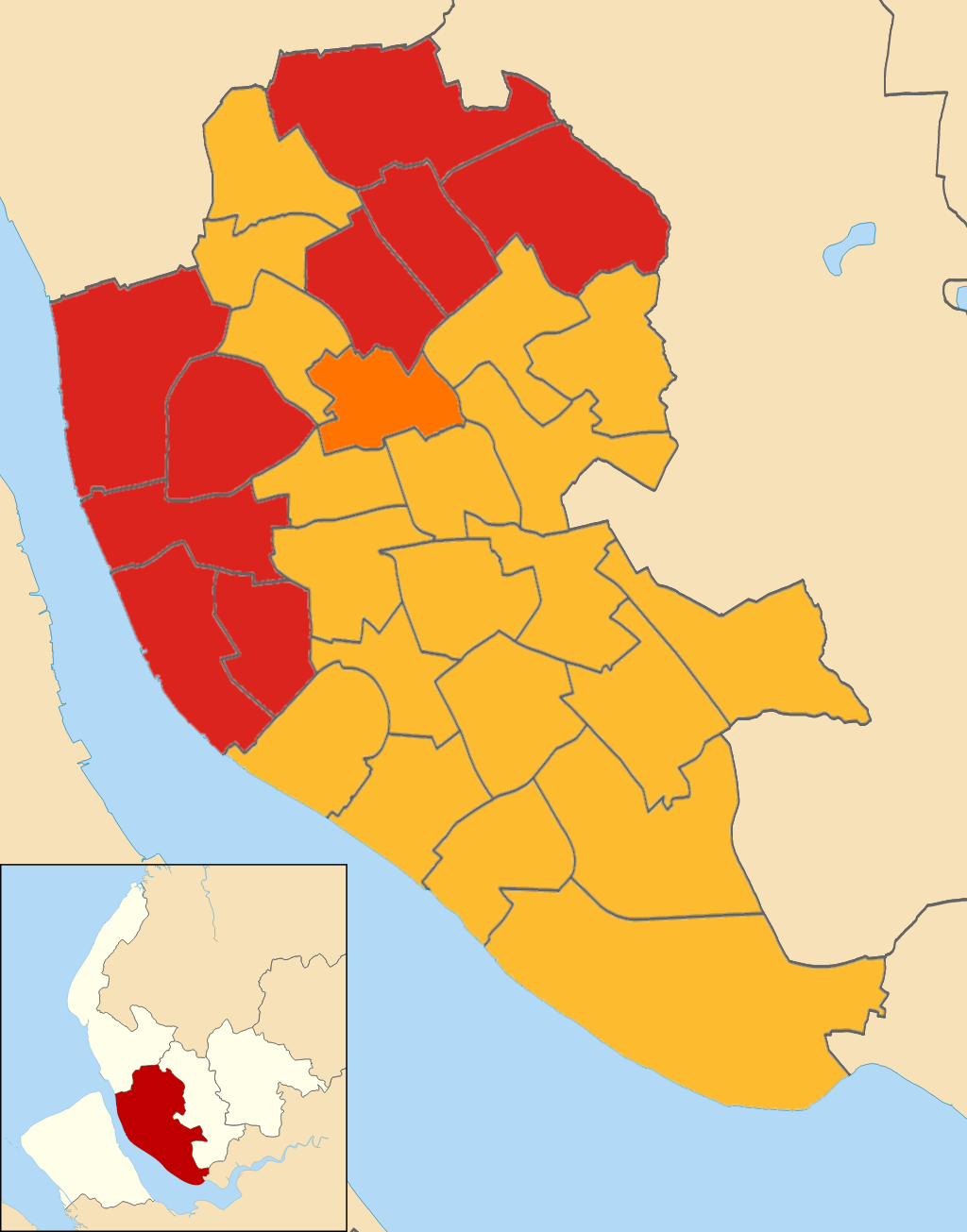
2004 local election results in Liverpool

Elections to Liverpool City Council were held on 10 June 2004. The whole council was up for election, with boundary changes since the last election in 2003 reducing the number of seats by nine. The Liberal Democrat party kept overall control of the council.

== Election result ==
Liverpool local election result 2004
Party	Seats	Gains	Losses	Net gain/loss	Seats %	Votes %	Votes	+/−
Liberal Democrats	60			-3	66.7	52.9	157,372	+3.1
Labour	27			-3	30.0	33.2	98,835	-1.0
Liberal	3			0	3.3	5.8	17,232	-1.0
Conservative	0			0	0.0	3.2	9,548	-0.9
Green	0			0	0.0	2.9	8,587	+0.1
Liverpool Labour	0			0	0.0	0.9	2,730	-0.5
Socialist Alliance	0			0	0.0	0.4	1,112	-0.2
Independent	0			0	0.0	0.3	836	+0.3
Socialist Labour	0			0	0.0	0.3	763	+0.3
BNP	0			0	0.0	0.1	327	-0.2
UKIP	0			0	0.0	0.1	266	+0.1
Communist	0			0	0.0	0.03	86	+0.03
Others	0			-3	0.0	0.0	0	

== Ward results ==
=== Allerton & Hunts Cross ===
Allerton & Hunts Cross (3)
Party	Candidate	Votes	%	±%
Liberal Democrats	Flo Clucas	3,058		
Liberal Democrats	John Clucas	2,603		
Liberal Democrats	Veronica Best	2,409		
Labour	William Braben	913		
Labour	David Shepherd	733		
Labour	Carol Crofts	726		
Conservative	Brenda Coppell	580		
Conservative	Norman Coppell	564		
Conservative	Mark Bill	510		
Liberal	Christopher Hulme	284		
Turnout		12,380		

=== Anfield ===
Anfield (3)
Party	Candidate	Votes	%	±%
Liberal Democrats	Robert Quinn	1,586		
Liberal Democrats	Kiron Reid	1,500		
Liberal Democrats	Jeremy Chowings	1,328		
Labour	Thomas Carter	836		
Labour	Brian Dowling	719		
Liberal	Michael Butler	688		
Labour	Janet Kent	680		
Liberal	Linda Roberts	519		
Independent	Joseph Kenny	335		
Socialist Alliance	Lesley Mahmood	108		
Socialist Alliance	Ernest Nattrass	55		
Turnout		8,354		

=== Belle Vale ===
Belle Vale (3)
Party	Candidate	Votes	%	±%
Liberal Democrats	Thomas Marshall	2,082		
Liberal Democrats	Ian Phillips	1,922		
Labour	Pauline Walton	1,859		
Liberal Democrats	Francis O'Donoghue	1,796		
Labour	Oliver Martins	1,626		
Labour	Timothy Moore	1,537		
Conservative	Joyce Larrosa	181		
Turnout		11,003		

=== Central ===
Central (3)
Party	Candidate	Votes	%	±%
Labour	Richard White	580		
Labour	Sharon Sullivan	577		
Labour	Nick Small	515		
Liberal Democrats	Alison Campbell	497		
Liberal Democrats	David Roscoe	479		
Liberal Democrats	Christopher Curry	459		
Liverpool Labour	George Knibb	324		
Liverpool Labour	Marie Whitty	278		
Green	Faye Griffiths	223		
Green	Peter Cranie	191		
Green	Alexander Rudkin	141		
Conservative	Diane Watson	74		
Liberal	Stephen Houghland	28		
Turnout		4,366		

=== Childwall ===
Childwall (3)
Party	Candidate	Votes	%	±%
Liberal Democrats	Edwin Clein	3,418		
Liberal Democrats	Doreen Jones	3,306		
Liberal Democrats	Trevor Jones	3,121		
Labour	Frank Hont	831		
Labour	David Minahan	624		
Labour	William Owen	580		
Green	Anne Saunders	534		
Turnout		12,414		

=== Church ===
Church (3)
Party	Candidate	Votes	%	±%
Liberal Democrats	Erica Kemp	3,870		
Liberal Democrats	Richard Kemp	3,771		
Liberal Democrats	Colin Eldridge	3,465		
Green	Eleanor Martin	736		
Labour	Wendy Simon	733		
Labour	Neville Jones	601		
Labour	David Holt	531		
Turnout		13,707		

=== Clubmoor ===
Clubmoor (3)
Party	Candidate	Votes	%	±%
Labour	Benjamin Williams	1,844		
Labour	Irene Rainey	1,626		
Labour	Rochne Gladden	1,624		
Liberal Democrats	Irene Smith	1,542		
Liberal Democrats	Ann Kendrick	1,445		
Liberal Democrats	Joanna Connolly	1,230		
Liberal	Deborah Tilston	466		
Liberal	Frances Fall	432		
Liberal	Michael Williams	377		
Socialist Labour	Gary Theys	72		
Turnout		10,658		

=== County ===
County (3)
Party	Candidate	Votes	%	±%
Liberal Democrats	Marilyn Fielding	2,067		
Liberal Democrats	Karen Afford	1,881		
Liberal Democrats	Paul Clark	1,869		
Labour	Patrick Delahunty	1,515		
Labour	Gary Booth	1,512		
Labour	Jeanette Fearon	1,440		
Liberal	Roger Webb	96		
Liberal	Thomas Newall	95		
Liberal	Damian O'Brien	60		
Turnout		10,535		

=== Cressington ===
Cressington (3)
Party	Candidate	Votes	%	±%
Liberal Democrats	Beatrice Fraenkel	2,747		
Liberal Democrats	Peter Millea	2,536		
Liberal Democrats	Richard Oglethorpe	2,283		
Labour	Catherine Dooley	933		
Labour	Sarah Phippard	822		
Labour	Mary Rasmussen	652		
Green	Alex Ferguson	534		
Conservative	James Berry	506		
Conservative	Derek Nuttall	387		
Liberal	Catherine Hancox	361		
Conservative	Maureen Williams	356		
Liberal	Joseph Flannery	350		
Turnout		12,467		

=== Croxteth ===
Croxteth (3)
Party	Candidate	Votes	%	±%
Labour	Mary Bailey	1,749		
Labour	Alan Fearnehough	1,426		
Labour	Nadia Stewart	1,379		
Liberal Democrats	Pamela Clein	1,350		
Liberal Democrats	Patrick Moloney	1,326		
Liberal Democrats	James Gaskell	1,248		
Liverpool Labour	Anthony Jennings	324		
Liverpool Labour	John Jones	315		
Liverpool Labour	Henry Bennett	303		
Conservative	Audrey Bowness	170		
Green	Anne Graham	165		
Liberal	Beryl Ackers	127		
Liberal	Francis Porter	91		
Socialist Labour	Violet Shaw	90		
Liberal	Jean Worrall	82		
Turnout		10,145		

=== Everton ===
Everton (3)
Party	Candidate	Votes	%	±%
Labour	Francis Prendergast	1,834		
Labour	Jane Corbett	1,827		
Labour	John McIntosh	1,678		
Liberal Democrats	Kathryn Kavanagh	453		
Liberal Democrats	Derek McKenna	424		
Liberal Democrats	Sally-Anne Thompson	389		
Liverpool Labour	Dougie Kidd	320		
Green	Helen Bryant	270		
Liberal	Justin Prescott	268		
Independent	Harry Jones	212		
Liberal	Daniel Wood	192		
Turnout		7,867		

=== Fazakerley ===
Fazakerley (3)
Party	Candidate	Votes	%	±%
Labour	John Spriggs	1,872		
Labour	Steven Rotheram	1,796		
Labour	David Hanratty	1,765		
Liberal Democrats	Graham Seddon	1,320		
Liberal Democrats	Ann Scott	1,131		
Liberal Democrats	Gerard Scott	1,091		
Conservative	Donna Lockley	321		
Liberal	Alan Bilby	173		
Liberal	Thomas McDonald	164		
Liberal	Terence Formby	146		
Independent	Sean Doherty	116		
Turnout		9,895		

=== Greenbank ===
Greenbank (3)
Party	Candidate	Votes	%	±%
Liberal Democrats	Janet Clein	1,649		
Liberal Democrats	Paul Clein	1,616		
Liberal Democrats	Linda-Jane Buckle	1,577		
Labour	Anna Murphy	568		
Labour	Josephine Lazzari	515		
Labour	Anthony Murphy	507		
Green	Julie Birch-Holt	400		
Green	Andrew Hoban	389		
Green	Penelope Mosgrove	325		
Conservative	John Creagh	208		
Conservative	Peter Henn	202		
Socialist Alliance	Stella Yates	200		
Socialist Alliance	Robert Foulkes	152		
Socialist Alliance	Christopher Jones	145		
Turnout		8,453		

=== Kensington & Fairfield ===
Kensington & Fairfield (3)
Party	Candidate	Votes	%	±%
Liberal Democrats	Frank Doran	1,528		
Liberal Democrats	Richard Marbrow	1,346		
Liberal Democrats	James Kendrick	1,321		
Labour	Michael Fox	1,155		
Labour	James Noakes	1,082		
Labour	Francis Steer	1,022		
Socialist Labour	Miichael Lane	257		
Liberal	Karen Williams	217		
Liberal	Damien Daly	192		
Liberal	James Richardson	177		
Conservative	Francis Dunne	117		
Turnout		8,414		

=== Kirkdale ===
Kirkdale (3)
Party	Candidate	Votes	%	±%
Labour	Joseph Hanson	2,378		
Labour	Cecilia Holleran	2,315		
Labour	Malcolm Kennedy	2,145		
Liverpool Labour	Alfred Hincks	365		
Liberal Democrats	Pauline Bradley	274		
Liberal Democrats	David Downham	260		
Liverpool Labour	Sandra Kenwright	258		
Liberal Democrats	Carole Tonner	250		
Liverpool Labour	Thomas Smith	243		
Liberal	David O'Brien	125		
Liberal	Susan O'Brien	125		
Green	Margaret Williams	125		
Green	Daniel Cook	121		
Green	Eline Van Der Linde	115		
Liberal	George Roberts	105		
Turnout		9,204		

=== Knotty Ash ===
Knotty Ash (3)
Party	Candidate	Votes	%	±%
Liberal Democrats	David Irving	1,907		
Liberal Democrats	Christopher Newby	1,880		
Liberal Democrats	Josephine Mullen	1,732		
Labour	Brenda McGrath	1,179		
Labour	Peter Killeen	1,156		
Labour	Peter Davidson	1,095		
Liberal	Andrew Donaldson	310		
Conservative	Duncan Phillips	225		
Liberal	Elaine Tyrer	216		
Turnout		9,700		

=== Mossley Hill ===
Mossley Hill (3)
Party	Candidate	Votes	%	±%
Liberal Democrats	David Antrobus	2,685		
Liberal Democrats	Ronald Gould	2,468		
Liberal Democrats	Tina Gould	2,413		
Labour	Daniel Hughes	783		
Labour	Stephen Bennett	646		
Labour	Benjamin Folley	646		
Green	Vicki Anderson	566		
Conservative	Michael Bunter	405		
Conservative	Kenneth Watkin	386		
Green	Adam Howarth	376		
Conservative	Ann Nugent	375		
Turnout		11,749		

=== Norris Green ===
Norris Green (3)
Party	Candidate	Votes	%	±%
Labour	Francis Cooke	1,850		
Labour	Alan Walker	1,826		
Labour	Violet Bebb	1,713		
Liberal Democrats	Kelly Woods	417		
Liberal Democrats	Cecilia McBride	387		
Liberal Democrats	Linda Woods	370		
BNP	Joseph Owens	327		
Liberal	Charles Mayes	280		
Liberal	Vera Phillips	272		
Liberal	Irene Mayes	269		
Green	Eric Cartmel	199		
Socialist Labour	Kai Andersen	167		
Turnout		8,077		

=== Old Swan ===
Old Swan (3)
Party	Candidate	Votes	%	±%
Liberal Democrats	Kevin Firth	2,290		
Liberal Democrats	Bernadette Turner	2,286		
Liberal Democrats	Keith Turner	2,239		
Labour	John McCabe	1,096		
Labour	Joseph Roberts	807		
Labour	Carl Roper	786		
Liberal	John Moore	206		
Liberal	Maria Langley	176		
Socialist Alliance	Cecelia Ralph	171		
Socialist Alliance	John Ralph	169		
Socialist Alliance	Paul Filby	112		
Turnout		10,338		

=== Picton ===
Picton (3)
Party	Candidate	Votes	%	±%
Liberal Democrats	Andrew Makinson	1,871		
Liberal Democrats	Ian Jobling	1,782		
Liberal Democrats	Laurence Sidorczuk	1,764		
Labour	Angela Glanville	1,192		
Labour	Denis Dunphy	1,104		
Labour	Neville Bann	1,054		
Turnout		8,767		

=== Princes Park ===
Princes Park (3)
Party	Candidate	Votes	%	±%
Labour	Gideon Ben-Tovim	1,029		
Labour	Alan Dean	1,026		
Liberal Democrats	Mohamed Ali	935		
Labour	Suraj-Prakash Sharma	891		
Liberal Democrats	Paul Twigger	857		
Liberal Democrats	Nabil Sultan	788		
Green	Anja Ploger	420		
Green	Simon Holgate	381		
Green	Justine Williams	206		
Independent	Nina Edge	173		
Conservative	Catherine Hirst	154		
Turnout		6,860		

=== Riverside ===
Riverside (3)
Party	Candidate	Votes	%	±%
Labour	Stephen Munby	1,532		
Labour	Paul Brant	1,524		
Labour	Joseph Anderson	1,468		
Liberal Democrats	Perry Lee	712		
Liberal Democrats	Annette Butler	681		
Liberal Democrats	Gabriel Muies	637		
Green	Natasha Stentiford	188		
Conservative	John Watson	171		
Conservative	Alma McGing	166		
Green	Lynsey Warner	165		
Green	Jennifer Brown	154		
Communist	James Cormack	86		
Turnout		7,484		

=== St Michaels ===
St Michaels (3)
Party	Candidate	Votes	%	±%
Liberal Democrats	Elaine Allen	1,552		
Liberal Democrats	John Coyne	1,537		
Liberal Democrats	Peter Allen	1,484		
Labour	Jack Johnson	750		
Labour	Jonathan Reynolds	727		
Labour	Peter Tuffley	708		
Green	Jean Hill	514		
Green	Jonathan Clatworthy	453		
Green	Howard Jago	391		
Conservative	Helen Hicklin	316		
Conservative	David Patmore	280		
Conservative	Elizabeth Morton	261		
Turnout		8,973		

=== Speke-Garston ===
Speke-Garston (3)
Party	Candidate	Votes	%	±%
Liberal Democrats	Danny Hughes	2,368		
Liberal Democrats	Paula Keaveney	2,313		
Liberal Democrats	Frank Roderick	2,211		
Labour	Doreen Knight	1,608		
Labour	Colin Strickland	1,506		
Labour	Raymond Carrick	1,417		
Conservative	Denise Nuttall	169		
Turnout		11,592		

=== Tuebrook & Stoneycroft ===
Tuebrook & Stoneycroft (3)
Party	Candidate	Votes	%	±%
Liberal	Stephen Radford	2,919		
Liberal	Hazel Williams	2,453		
Liberal	Christopher Lenton	2,385		
Labour	Robert Millington	633		
Labour	Allen Hammond	597		
Labour	James Allan	518		
Liberal Democrats	John McBride	324		
Liberal Democrats	Linda Evans	304		
Liberal Democrats	Ian Bull	279		
Turnout		10,412		

=== Warbreck ===
Warbreck (3)
Party	Candidate	Votes	%	±%
Liberal Democrats	Elsie Lang	2,643		
Liberal Democrats	Richard Roberts	2,450		
Liberal Democrats	Jean Seddon	2,309		
Labour	James Gabriel	1,217		
Labour	Robert Carney	970		
Labour	Christine Norris	952		
Liberal	Richard Wright	127		
Turnout		10,668		

=== Wavertree ===
Wavertree (3)
Party	Candidate	Votes	%	±%
Liberal Democrats	Warren Bradley	2,918		
Liberal Democrats	Michael Storey	2,836		
Liberal Democrats	Stephen Hurst	2,652		
Labour	Matthew Dunne	550		
Labour	Ebenezer Quartey	498		
Labour	Barrie Grunewald	491		
Turnout		9,945		

=== West Derby ===
West Derby (3)
Party	Candidate	Votes	%	±%
Liberal Democrats	Ann Hines	2,436		
Liberal Democrats	Norman Mills	2,202		
Liberal Democrats	Stuart Monkcom	2,058		
Labour	Joseph Foy	782		
Labour	Lilian Foy	764		
Labour	Ronald Foy	718		
Conservative	Geoffrey Brandwood	378		
Green	Ian Graham	305		
Liberal	Edith Bamford	302		
Liberal	Patricia Elmour	282		
UKIP	Kenneth Crick	266		
Liberal	Barbara Pickstock	265		
Socialist Labour	Patrick Goodwin	95		
Turnout		10,853		

=== Woolton ===
Woolton (3)
Party	Candidate	Votes	%	±%
Liberal Democrats	Barbara Collinge	3,440		
Liberal Democrats	Barbara Mace	3,311		
Liberal Democrats	Malcolm Kelly	3,134		
Conservative	Emlyn Williams	656		
Conservative	Stephen Fitzsimmons	599		
Labour	Maureen Freeman	594		
Conservative	Nanik Vaswani	589		
Labour	Laurence Freeman	571		
Labour	Richard Keenan	495		
Turnout		13,389		

=== Yew Tree ===
Yew Tree (3)
Party	Candidate	Votes	%	±%
Liberal Democrats	Robert Ousby	1,636		
Liberal Democrats	Graham Hulme	1,582		
Liberal Democrats	Roger Johnston	1,469		
Labour	Peter Holden	1,160		
Labour	Barbara Murray	1,023		
Labour	John Prince	1,001		
Liberal	Kevin Buchanan	311		
Liberal	Tracey Hawksford	306		
Conservative	Brian Jones	242		
Liberal	Deborah Mayes	213		
Socialist Labour	Thomas McKay	82		
Turnout		9,025		
