= 2008 Liverpool City Council election =

2008 UK local government election

- 1 May 2008

31 seats were up for election (one third): one seat for each of the 30 wards plus one by-election 46 seats needed for a majority
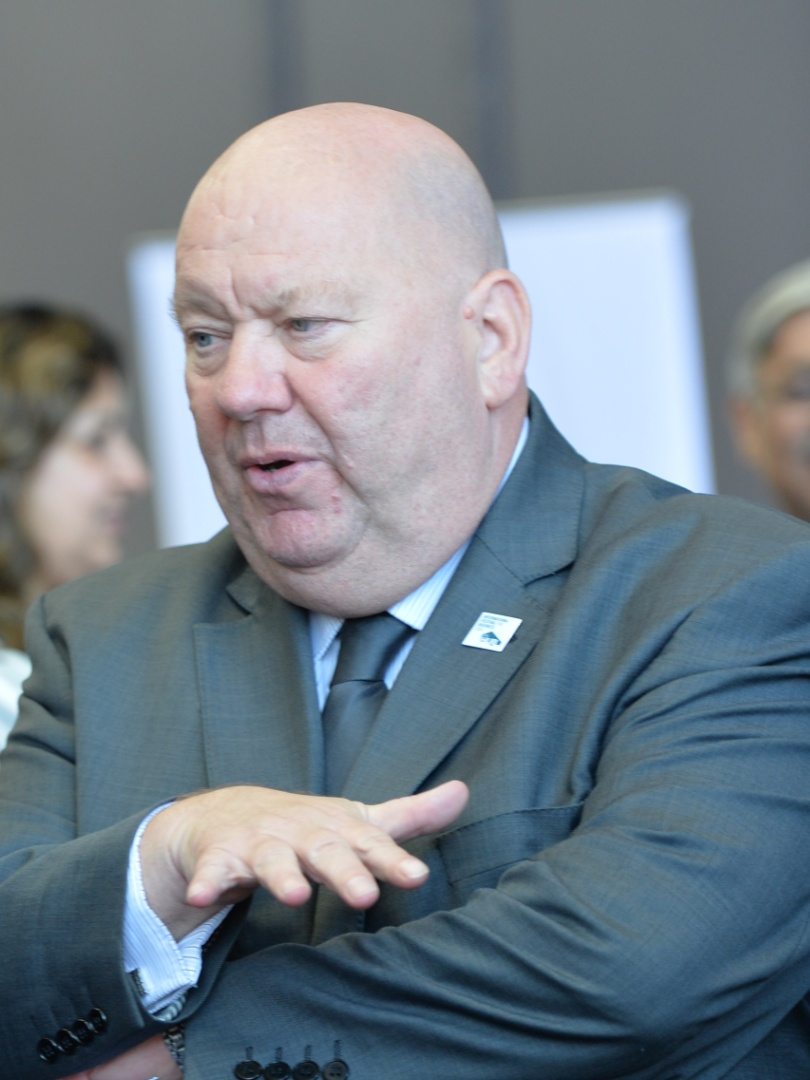
	First party	Second party	Third party
Leader	Warren Bradley	Joe Anderson
Party	Liberal Democrats	Labour	Liberal
Seat change	▼	▲
Percentage	%		%
Swing	▼%	▲%	▼%
	Fourth party
Party	Green
Percentage	%
Swing	▼%
Leader of Largest Party before election
Liberal Democrats
Subsequent Leader of Largest Party
Liberal Democrats

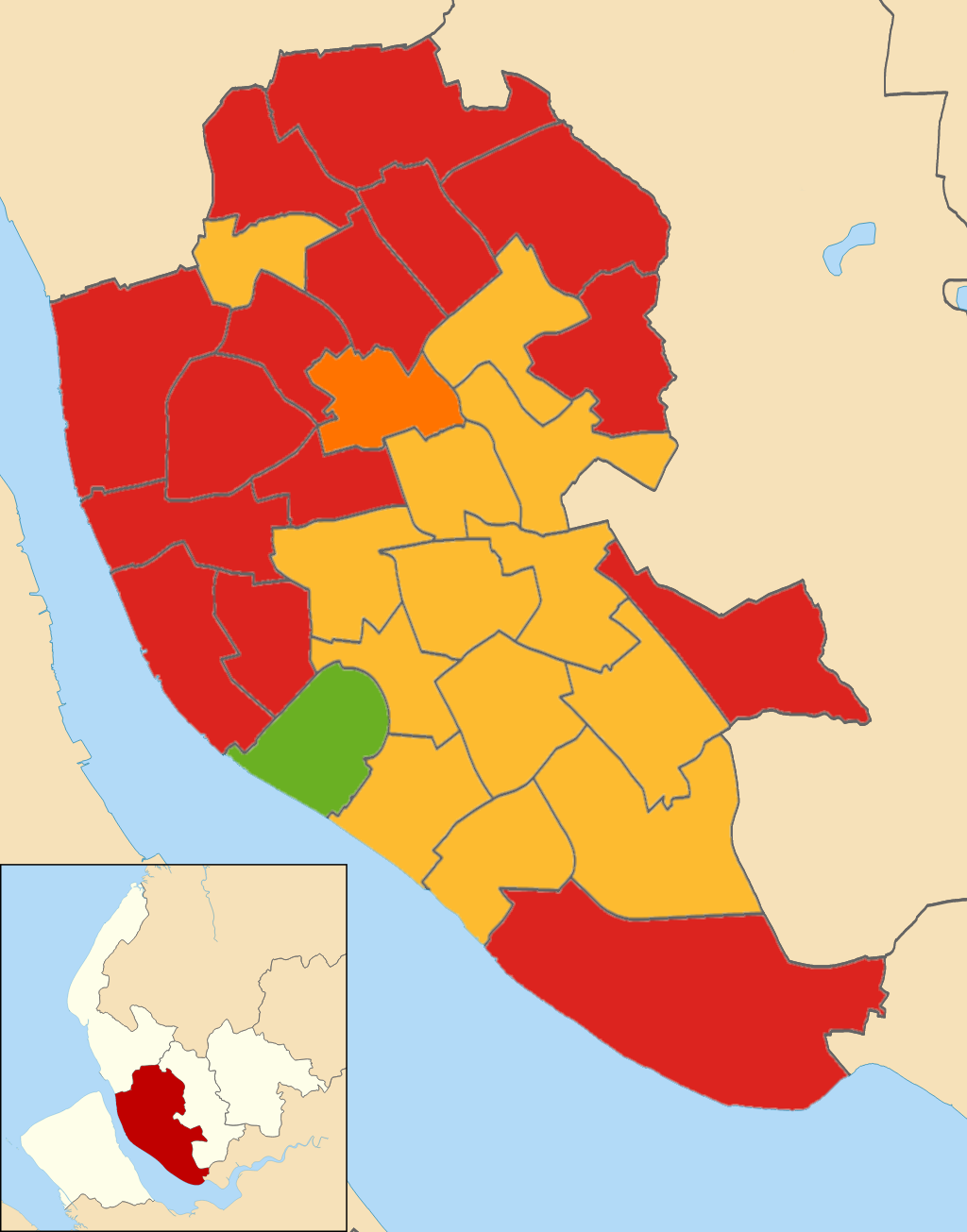
2008 local election results in Liverpool

Elections to Liverpool City Council were held on 1 May 2008. One third of the council was up for election. (30 seats plus 1 in a by-election)

After the election, the composition of the council was

Party	Seats	±
Liberal Democrat	50	-5
Labour	35	+4
Liberal Party	3	0
Green	2	+1

== Election result ==
Liverpool local election result 2008
Party	Seats	Gains	Losses	Net gain/loss	Seats %	Votes %	Votes	+/−
Liberal Democrats	13	0	5	-5	42%	34%	31,085	
Labour	16	4	0	+4	52%	41%	35,082	
Liberal	1	0	0	0	3.2%	7.6%	6,874	
Green	1	1	0	+1	3.2%	6.7%	6,045	
Conservative	0	0	0	0	0%	8.5%	7,724	
BNP	0	0	0	0	0%	3.4%	3,063	
Independent	0	0	0	0	0%	0.74%	635	
UKIP	0	0	0	0	0%	0.08%	70	
United Socialist	0	0	0	0	0%	0.078%	67	
Socialist Labour	0	0	0	0	0%	0.067%	58	

== Ward results ==
* – Councillor standing for re-election.

=== Allerton & Hunts Cross ===
Allerton & Hunts Cross
Party	Candidate	Votes	%	±%
Liberal Democrats	Flo Clucas *	1,605	48.56	+3.74
Conservative	Adam Ernest Marsden	737	22.30	+4.20
Labour	Colin McAlley	684	20.70	+0.30
Green	Margaret Williams	171	5.17	+0.07
Liberal	Christopher Hulme	108	3.27	−0.93
Majority		868		
Registered electors		10,942		
Turnout		3,305	30%	
Rejected ballots		11		
Liberal Democrats hold		Swing		

=== Anfield ===
Anfield
Party	Candidate	Votes	%	±%
Labour	Brian Dowling	1,521	52%	
Liberal Democrats	Robbie Quinn *	1,077	37%	
Liberal	Stephen Houghland	133	4.5%	
Conservative	Francis Stevens	97	3.3%	
Green	Jean Hill	96	3.3%	
Independent	Michael McDonough	27	0.91	
Majority		444		
Registered electors		10,153		
Turnout		2,951	29%	
Rejected ballots		10		
Liberal Democrats hold		Swing		

=== Belle Vale ===
Belle Vale
Party	Candidate	Votes	%	±%
Labour	Claire Wilner	1,673	46%	
Liberal Democrats	Tom Marshall *	1,383	38%	
BNP	Peter Michael Molloy	336	9.2%	
Conservative	Jack Stallworthy	111	3%	
Green	Mark Bowman	78	2.1%	
United Socialist	Paul Filby	67	1.8%	
Majority		291		
Registered electors		11,024		
Turnout		3,648	33%	
Rejected ballots		11		
Labour gain from Liberal Democrats		Swing		

=== Central ===
Central
Party	Candidate	Votes	%	±%
Labour	Christine Banks	722	61%	
Liberal Democrats	James Murray	157	13%	
Green	Michael Cotgreave	134	11%	
Conservative	Gregg Watson	118	10%	
Liberal	Lisa Gaskell	44	3.7%	
Majority		534		
Registered electors		12,248		
Turnout		1,175	9.6%	
Rejected ballots		6		
Labour hold		Swing		

=== Childwall ===
Childwall
Party	Candidate	Votes	%	±%
Liberal Democrats	Eddie Clein *	1,925	56%	
Labour	Peter Dowling	711	21%	
Conservative	Chris Lighten	490	14%	
Green	Geoff Bunn	202	5.8%	
Liberal	Philip Daley	140	4%	
Majority		1,435		
Registered electors		11,082		
Turnout		3,468	31%	
Rejected ballots		14		
Liberal Democrats hold		Swing		

=== Church ===
Church
Party	Candidate	Votes	%	±%
Liberal Democrats	Erica Kemp *	2,330	60%	
Labour	David Shepherd	522	13%	
Conservative	Norman Coppell	360	9.3%	
Green	Eleanor Martin	286	7.4%	
Independent	Jeffrey Berman	273	7%	
Liberal	James MacGregor	100	2.6%	
Majority		1,970		
Registered electors		1,699		
Turnout		3,871	36%	
Rejected ballots		10		
Liberal Democrats hold		Swing		

=== Clubmoor ===
Clubmoor
Party	Candidate	Votes	%	±%
Labour	Jim Noakes	1,341	48%	
Liberal	Dennis Gaskell	859	31%	
BNP	Peter Squire	358	12%	
Conservative	Gwynneth Hicklin	150	5.4%	
Green	Eleanor Pontin	68	2.4%	
Independent	Maggie Stewart	18	0.6%	
Majority		482		
Registered electors		11,282		
Turnout		2794	24.77	
Rejected ballots		9		
Labour hold		Swing		

=== County ===
County
Party	Candidate	Votes	%	±%
Liberal Democrats	Marilyn Fielding *	1,196	43%	
Labour	Gerard Woodhouse	1,189	42%	
BNP	Peter Stafford	200	7%	
UKIP	Colin Windever	70	2.5%	
Conservative	Paul Barber	66	2.4%	
Green	Tony Jones	48	1.7%	
Liberal	Roger Webb	32	1.1%	
Majority		7		
Registered electors		10,126		
Turnout		2,801	28%	
Rejected ballots		3		
Liberal Democrats hold		Swing		

=== Cressington ===
Cressington
Party	Candidate	Votes	%	±%
Liberal Democrats	Paula Keaveney	1,812	50%	
Labour	Anna Briggs	792	22%	
Conservative	Paul Athans	638	18%	
Green	Martin Randall	262	7.3%	
Liberal	John Pagan	108	3%	
Majority		1,020		
Registered electors		11,192		
Turnout		3,612	32%	
Rejected ballots		9		
Liberal Democrats hold		Swing		

=== Croxteth ===
Croxteth
Party	Candidate	Votes	%	±%
Labour	Rose Bailey *	1,810	52%	
Liberal Democrats	Stephen Geoghegan	1,245	36%	
Independent	Ken Stewart	171	4.9%	
BNP	George Muse	109	3.1%	
Conservative	Diane Westwell	88	2.5%	
Green	Don Ross	77	2.2%	
Majority		565		
Registered electors		10,496		
Turnout		3,500	33%	
Rejected ballots		8		
Labour hold		Swing		

=== Everton ===
Everton
Party	Candidate	Votes	%	±%
Labour	Frank Prendergast *	1,678	72%	
BNP	Jackie Stafford	222	9.5%	
Conservative	Mark Cotterell	130	5.6%	
Liberal Democrats	Peter Rainford	120	5.2%	
Green	Peter North	102	4.4%	
Liberal	Linda Roberts	78	3.4%	
Majority		1,456		
Registered electors		10,101		
Turnout		2,330	23%	
Rejected ballots		7		
Labour hold		Swing		

=== Fazakerley ===
Fazakerley
Party	Candidate	Votes	%	±%
Labour	Jack Spriggs *	1,811	58%	
Liberal Democrats	Graham Seddon	608	19%	
BNP	Peter Stafford	440	14%	
Conservative	Denise Nuttall	154	4.9%	
Liberal	Jane Canning	68	2.2%	
Green	Ralf Ganza	64	2%	
Majority		1,203		
Registered electors		11,377		
Turnout		3,145	28%	
Rejected ballots		9		
Labour hold		Swing		

=== Greenbank ===
Greenbank
Party	Candidate	Votes	%	±%
Liberal Democrats	Janet Clein *	1,180	48%	
Labour	Christopher Helm	564	23%	
Green	Martin Dobson	498	20%	
Conservative	Ann Nugent	165	6.7%	
Liberal	Susan O'Brien	52	2.1%	
Majority		544		
Registered electors		10,561		
Turnout		2,459	23%	
Rejected ballots		11		
Liberal Democrats hold		Swing		

=== Kensington & Fairfield ===
Kensington & Fairfield
Party	Candidate	Votes	%	±%
Labour	Liam Robinson	1.411	48%	
Liberal Democrats	Francis Doran *	1,214	41%	
Green	Janet Bunn	144	4.9%	
Conservative	Nigel Barber	93	3.1%	
Liberal	Karen Williams	85	2.9%	
Majority		197		
Registered electors		9,438		
Turnout		2,947	31%	
Rejected ballots		8		
Labour gain from Liberal Democrats		Swing		

=== Kirkdale ===
Kirkdale – 2 seats
Party	Candidate	Votes	%	±%
Labour	Joseph Hanson *	1,971	40%	
Labour	Beatrice Fraenkel	1,737	36%	
BNP	Steven Greenhalgh	389	8%	
Independent	Will Thomson	146	3%	
Liberal Democrats	Pauline Bradley	144	3%	
Liberal Democrats	Thomas Morrison	107	2.2%	
Green	Jonathan Clatworthy	96	2%	
Green	Alison Edis	95	2%	
Conservative	Alma McGing	95	2%	
Conservative	John Watson	61	1.3%	
Liberal	Damien Daly	46	0.94%	
Majority		1,582		
Registered electors		11,512		
Turnout		4,887	21%	
Rejected ballots		9		
Labour hold		Swing		
Labour hold		Swing		

=== Knotty Ash ===
Knotty Ash
Party	Candidate	Votes	%	±%
Liberal Democrats	David Irving *	1,642	46%	
Labour	Anthony Conception	1,607	45%	
Conservative	Geoffrey Brandwood	185	5.2%	
Green	James Munro	128	3.6%	
Majority		35		
Registered electors		10,0083		
Turnout		3,562	35%	
Rejected ballots		11		
Liberal Democrats hold		Swing		

=== Mossley Hill ===
Mossley Hill
Party	Candidate	Votes	%	±%
Liberal Democrats	Lynnie Williams	1,445	45%	
Labour	Matthew Garlick	650	20%	
Conservative	Giselle McDonald	570	18%	
Green	Robert Smith	403	13%	
Liberal	David Wood	140	4%	
Majority		795		
Registered electors		10,515		
Turnout		3,208	31%	
Rejected ballots		9		
Liberal Democrats hold		Swing		

=== Norris Green ===
Norris Green
Party	Candidate	Votes	%	±%
Labour	Francis Cooke *	1,520	64%	
BNP	John Edgar	303	13%	
Liberal	Vera Phillips	258	11%	
Conservative	Michael Lind	148	6.3%	
Green	Thomas Crone	70	3%	
Socialist Labour	Kai Anderson	58	2.4%	
Majority		1,217		
Registered electors		10,519		
Turnout		2,357	22%	
Rejected ballots		3		
Labour hold		Swing		

=== Old Swan ===
Old Swan
Party	Candidate	Votes	%	±%
Liberal Democrats	Gary Millar	1,372	45%	
Labour	Allen Hammond	824	27%	
Liberal	Edith Bamford	321	10%	
BNP	Steven McEllenborough	300	9.7%	
Green	Paul Grimes	130	4.2%	
Conservative	Lauren Graham	127	4.1%	
Majority		548		
Registered electors		11,559		
Turnout		3,074	27%	
Rejected ballots		5		
Liberal Democrats hold		Swing		

=== Picton ===
Picton
Party	Candidate	Votes	%	±%
Liberal Democrats	Andrew Makinson *	1,262	48%	
Labour	Timothy Beaumont	1,015	39%	
Green	Laurence Wilson	150	5.7%	
Liberal	Griffith Parry	109	4.1%	
Conservative	Ann Temple	99	3.8%	
Majority		247		
Registered electors		10,906		
Turnout		2,635	24%	
Rejected ballots		12		
Liberal Democrats hold		Swing		

=== Princes Park ===
Princes Park
Party	Candidate	Votes	%	±%
Labour	Timothy Moore	1,227	49%	
Liberal Democrats	Mumin Khan	714	29%	
Green	Rebecca Lawson	318	13%	
Conservative	Catherine Hirst	163	6.5%	
Liberal	Michael Williams	74	3%	
Majority		513		
Registered electors		10,049		
Turnout		2,496	25%	
Rejected ballots		17		
Labour hold		Swing		

=== Riverside ===
Riverside
Party	Candidate	Votes	%	±%
Labour	Stephen Munby *	1,838	73%	
Liberal Democrats	Conor McDonald	202	8%	
Conservative	Emlyn Williams	189	7.5%	
Green	William Ward	184	7.3%	
Liberal	John Graves	102	4%	
Majority		1,636		
Registered electors		10,771		
Turnout		2,515	23%	
Rejected ballots		10		
Labour hold		Swing		

=== St Michael's ===
St Michaels
Party	Candidate	Votes	%	±%
Green	Sarah Jennings	1,309	43%	
Liberal Democrats	Elaine Allen *	1,128	37%	
Labour	Nicholas Mutize	485	16%	
Conservative	David Patmore	149	4.9%	
Majority		181		
Registered electors		9,706		
Turnout		3,071	32%	
Rejected ballots		13		
Green gain from Liberal Democrats		Swing		

=== Speke-Garston ===
Speke-Garston
Party	Candidate	Votes	%	±%
Labour	Colin Strickland *	1,866	63%	
Liberal Democrats	Jackie Wilson	479	16%	
BNP	Jane Greenhalgh	208	7%	
Conservative	Brenda Coppell	171	5.8%	
Liberal	Irene Mayes	128	4.4%	
Green	Fiona Coyne	93	3.2%	
Majority		1,387		
Registered electors		12,699		
Turnout		2,945	23%	
Rejected ballots		6		
Labour gain from Liberal Democrats		Swing		

=== Tuebrook & Stoneycroft ===
Tuebrook & Stoneycroft
Party	Candidate	Votes	%	±%
Liberal	Steve Radford *	2,128	72%	
Labour	Robert Millington	484	16%	
Liberal Democrats	Kathryn Dadswell	135	4.6%	
Green	Jennifer Brown	92	3.1%	
Conservative	George Powell	99	3.4%	
Majority		1,644		
Registered electors		10,843		
Turnout		2,938	27%	
Rejected ballots		12		
Liberal hold		Swing		

=== Warbreck ===
Warbreck
Party	Candidate	Votes	%	±%
Labour	Richard McLinden	1,852	58%	
Liberal	George Roberts	724	23%	
Liberal Democrats	Richard Roberts	724	23%	
BNP	Carol Kilkenny	198	6.2%	
Conservative	Mark Rea	154	4.9%	
Green	Raphael Levy	99	3.1%	
Majority		1,128		
Registered electors		11,207		
Turnout		3,173	28%	
Rejected ballots		5		
Labour hold		Swing		

=== Wavertree ===
Wavertree
Party	Candidate	Votes	%	±%
Liberal Democrats	Warren Bradley *	2,223	69%	
Labour	Nicholas Wallace	508	16%	
Green	Julie Birch-Holt	297	9.2%	
Conservative	David Grundy	171	5.3%	
Liberal	Charles Mayes	46	1.4%	
Majority		1,715		
Registered electors		10,607		
Turnout		3,245	31%	
Rejected ballots		9		
Liberal hold		Swing		

=== West Derby ===
West Derby
Party	Candidate	Votes	%	±%
Liberal Democrats	Graham Hulme	1,244	37%	
Labour	Brenda McGrath	863	26%	
Liberal	Ann Hines *	731	22%	
Conservative	Neil Wilson	338	10%	
Green	Kim Graham	160	4.8%	
Majority		381		
Registered electors		11,144		
Turnout		3,336	30%	
Rejected ballots		16		
Liberal Democrats hold		Swing		

=== Woolton ===
Woolton
Party	Candidate	Votes	%	±%
Liberal Democrats	Barbara Collinge *	1,771	46%	
Conservative	Richard Downey	1,254	33%	
Labour	Laurence Freeman	572	15%	
Green	Alexander Rudkin	161	4.2%	
Liberal	Maria Langley	58	1.5%	
Majority		517		
Registered electors		10,468		
Turnout		3,816	36%	
Rejected ballots		10		
Liberal Democrats hold		Swing		

=== Yew Tree ===
Yew Tree
Party	Candidate	Votes	%	±%
Labour	John Prince	1,370	49%	
Liberal Democrats	Gary Airey	820	30%	
Conservative	June Brandwood	345	12%	
Green	Peter Cranie	125	4.5%	
Liberal	Tracey Hawksford	112	4%	
Majority		550		
Registered electors		11,173		
Turnout		2,772	25%	
Rejected ballots		18		
Labour gain from Liberal Democrats		Swing		

== By Elections ==
=== Fazakerley, 18 February 2010 ===
Caused by the death of Councillor Jack Spriggs (Labour, elected 1 May 2008).

Fazakerley
Party	Candidate	Votes	%	±%
Labour	Louise Ashton-Armstrong	1,525	58%	
Liberal Democrats	Graham Charles Seddon	807	30%	
BNP	Peter James Stafford	234	8.8%	
Green	Alexander Rudkin	84	3.2%	
Majority		718		
Registered electors		11,310		
Turnout		2,650		
Labour hold		Swing		
