= Knotty Ash (ward) =

Former metropolitan borough council ward in Liverpool, England

Coordinates: 53.41705°N 2.88949°W

- Knotty Ash ward (2004) within Liverpool
- Area: 3.403 km^{2} (1.314 sq mi)
- Population: 14,355 (2021 census)
  - Density: 4,218/km^{2} (10,920/sq mi)
- Registered Electors: 10,397 (2021 election)
- Metropolitan borough: City of Liverpool
- Metropolitan county: Merseyside
- Region: North West
- Country: England
- Sovereign state: United Kingdom
- UK Parliament: Liverpool Walton

Knotty Ash ward was an electoral division of Liverpool City Council centred on the Knotty Ash district of Liverpool.

== Background ==
The ward was formed for the 2004 local elections and dissolved in 2023.

=== 2004 boundaries ===
A review by the Boundary Committee for England recommended that the council was formed of a reduced number of 90 members elected from 30 wards. The ward was formed from the former Broadgreen ward, taking in small parts from Childwall, Croxteth and Dovecot wards. The ward was part of the Liverpool West Derby Parliamentary constituency.

The population of the ward at the 2021 Census was 14,355.

=== 2023 elections ===
Following a 2022 review by the Local Government Boundary Commission for England which decided that the existing 30 wards each represented by three Councillors should be replaced by 64 wards represented by 85 councillors, the ward was split up into the new Broadgreen, Knotty Ash & Dovecot Park, Sandfield Park, and West Derby Leyfield wards.

== Councillors ==
| Election | Councillor | Councillor | Councillor |
|---|---|---|---|
| 2004 | Josie Mullen (LD) | Christopher Newby (LD) | David Irving (LD) |
| 2006 | Josie Mullen (LD) | Christopher Newby (LD) | David Irving (LD) |
| 2007 | Josie Mullen (LD) | Paul Twigger (LD) | David Irving (LD) |
| 2008 | Josie Mullen (LD) | Paul Twigger (LD) | David Irving (LD) |
| 2010 | Jacqui Nasuh (Lab) | Paul Twigger (LD) | David Irving (LD) |
| 2011 | Jacqui Nasuh (Lab) | Hayley Todd (Lab) | David Irving (LD) |
| 2012 | Ged Taylor (Lab) | Hayley Todd (Lab) | Nick Crofts (Lab) |
| 2014 | Ged Taylor (Lab) | Hayley Todd (Lab) | Nick Crofts (Lab) |
| 2015 | Ged Taylor (Lab) | Jacqui Taylor (Lab) | Nick Crofts (Lab) |
| 2016 | Ged Taylor (Lab) | Jacqui Taylor (Lab) | Nick Crofts (Lab) |
| 2018 | Alison Clarke (Lab) | Harry Doyle (Lab) | Nick Crofts (Lab) |
| 2019 | Alison Clarke (Lab) | Harry Doyle (Lab) | Nick Crofts (Lab) |
| 2021 | Alison Clarke (Lab) | Harry Doyle (Lab) | Nick Crofts (Lab) |

indicates seat up for re-election after boundary changes.

indicates seat up for re-election.

indicates change in affiliation.

indicates seat up for re-election after casual vacancy.

=== Notes ===
- Cllr Jacqui Nashuh (Labour, 2010) resigned from the Council in September 2012. A by-election was held on 15 November 2012 (the same date as the elections for the first Police and Crime Commissioner).
- Cllr Jacqui Taylor (Labour, 2015) resigned from the Council in 2018.

== Election results ==
=== Elections of the 2020s ===
Liverpool City Council Municipal Elections 2021: Thursday 6 May 2021
| Party | Candidate | Votes | % | ±% |
|---|---|---|---|---|
| **Labour** | **Nick Crofts** | **1,585** | **56.93** | **▼12.77** |
| Liberal Democrats | Alex Cottrell | 380 | 13.65 | ▲3.30 |
| Green | Paul Joseph Corry | 278 | 9.99 | ▲0.93 |
| Conservative | Jigarkom Hekmat | 277 | 9.95 | ▲2.54 |
| Liberal | Kenneth Russell | 89 | 3.49 | ▼0.29 |
| NHA | Stephen McNally | 137 | 4.92 | N/A |
| Majority | | 1,205 | 43.28 | ▼16.07 |
| Turnout | | 2,784 | 26.78 | ▲2.10 |
| Rejected ballots | | 44 | 1.56 | ▲0.32 |
| Total ballots | | 2,828 | 27.20 | |
| Registered electors | | 10,397 | | |
| Labour **hold** | | Swing | -8.03 | |

=== Elections of the 2010s ===
Liverpool City Council Municipal Elections 2019: Thursday 2 May 2019
| Party | Candidate | Votes | % | ±% |
|---|---|---|---|---|
| **Labour** | **Harry Doyle** | **1,778** | **69.70** | **▼4.20** |
| Liberal Democrats | Graham Hughes | 264 | 10.35 | ▲0.55 |
| Green | Fiona Coyne | 231 | 9.06 | ▲3.86 |
| Conservative | Mark Butchard | 189 | 7.41 | ▼2.29 |
| Liberal | Kenneth Russell | 89 | 3.49 | ▲1.99 |
| Majority | | 1,514 | 59.35 | ▼4.75 |
| Turnout | | 2,583 | 24.68 | ▼0.22 |
| Rejected ballots | | 32 | 1.24 | ▲1.04 |
| Registered electors | | 10,466 | | |
| Labour **hold** | | Swing | -2.38 | |

Liverpool City Council Municipal Elections 2018: Thursday 3 May 2018
| Party | Candidate | Votes | % | ±% |
|---|---|---|---|---|
| **Labour** | **Alison Clarke** | **1,978** | **73.9** | **▲10.9** |
| **Labour** | **Harry Doyle** | **1,895** | - | − |
| Liberal Democrats | Graham Hughes | 329 | 9.8 | ▼4.5 |
| Conservative | Mark Butchard | 272 | 9.7 | ▲5.8 |
| Conservative | Irene Stuart | 235 | | − |
| Liberal Democrats | Gerard Thompson | 182 | | − |
| Green | Fiona Coyne | 154 | 5.2 | ▲1.2 |
| Green | Michael Humphrey Johnson | 116 | | − |
| Liberal | Kenneth Russell | 79 | 1.5 | ▼1.0 |
| Majority | | 3,362 | 64.1 | ▲15.4 |
| Registered electors | | 10,599 | | |
| Turnout | | 2,624 | 24.9 | ▼5.2 |
| Rejected ballots | | 8 | 0.2 | ▼1.1 |
| Labour **hold** | | Swing | +7.7 | |
| Labour **hold** | | Swing | - | |

Liverpool City Council Municipal Elections 2016: Thursday 5 May 2016
| Party | Candidate | Votes | % | ±% |
|---|---|---|---|---|
| **Labour** | **Nick Crofts** | **1,923** | **62.99** | **▼5.17** |
| Liberal Democrats | Norman Mills | 436 | 14.28 | ▲7.57 |
| UKIP | Adam Giles Heatherington | 318 | 10.42% | ▼0.37 |
| Green | Fiona Coyne | 122 | 4.00 | ▼0.27 |
| Conservative | Irene Stuart | 119 | 3.90 | ▼2.75% |
| Liberal | Lindsey Janet Mary Wood | 77 | 2.52 | ▲0.84 |
| TUSC | Craig Foden | 58 | 1.90 | N/A |
| Majority | | 1,487 | 48.71 | ▼8.66 |
| Turnout | | 3,092 | 30.07 | ▼35.08 |
| Registered electors | | 10,282 | | |
| Labour **hold** | | Swing | -6.37 | |

Liverpool City Council Municipal Elections 2015: Thursday 7 May 2015
| Party | Candidate | Votes | % | ±% |
|---|---|---|---|---|
| **Labour** | **Jacqui Taylor** | **4,512** | **68.16** | **▲6.61** |
| UKIP | James Swarbrick | 714 | 10.79 | ▼7.32 |
| Liberal Democrats | Norman Mills | 444 | 6.71 | ▼1.16 |
| Conservative | Irene Stuart | 440 | 6.65 | ▲1.98 |
| Green | Jack Coutts | 283 | 4.27 | ▼0.37 |
| Liberal | Marjorie Peel | 111 | 1.68 | ▲0.30 |
| TUSC | Alan David Fogg | 100 | 1.51 | N/A |
| English Democrat | Derek Francis Grue | 16 | 0.24 | N/A |
| Majority | | 3,798 | 57.37 | ▲13.93 |
| Turnout | | 6,648 | 65.15 | ▲33.39 |
| Registered electors | | 10,204 | | |
| Labour **hold** | | Swing | +6.97 | |

Liverpool City Council Municipal Elections 2014 Thursday 22 May 2014
| Party | Candidate | Votes | % | ±% |
|---|---|---|---|---|
| **Labour** | **Ged Taylor** | **1,964** | **61.55** | **▼7.06** |
| UKIP | John David Sisson | 578 | 18.11 | ▲12.40 |
| Liberal Democrats | Norman Mills | 251 | 7.87 | ▼0.56 |
| Conservative | Emilio Chiquito | 149 | 4.67 | ▲2.41 |
| Green | Jade Kuhlke | 148 | 4.64 | ▲2.60 |
| English Democrat | Derek Francis Grue | 57 | 1.79 | ▼1.04 |
| Liberal | Marjorie Peel | 44 | 1.38 | ▼6.03 |
| Majority | | 1,386 | 43.44 | ▼16.74 |
| Turnout | | 3,191 | 31.76 | ▲13.83 |
| Labour **hold** | | Swing | -9.73 | |

Knotty Ash By-election: 15th November, 2012
| Party | Candidate | Votes | % | ±% |
|---|---|---|---|---|
| **Labour** | **Ged Taylor** | **1,213** | **68.61** | **▼3.32** |
| Liberal Democrats | Stephen Maddison | 149 | 8.43 | ▼4.66 |
| Liberal | Patricia Elmour | 131 | 7.41 | ▲4.58 |
| UKIP | Adam Heatherington | 101 | 5.71 | N/A |
| English Democrat | Derek Grue | 50 | 2.83 | N/A |
| TUSC | Charlie Cosgrove | 48 | 2.71 | ▼0.10 |
| Conservative | Jack Alexander Stallworthy | 40 | 2.26 | ▼1.98 |
| Green | Jon Deamer | 38 | 2.04 | ▼3.6 |
| Majority | | 1064 | 60.18 | ▲1.88 |
| Turnout | | 1768 | 17.93 | ▼16.77 |
| Labour **hold** | | Swing | +0.67% | |

Liverpool City Council Municipal Elections 2012: Thursday 3 May 2012
| Party | Candidate | Votes | % | ±% |
|---|---|---|---|---|
| **Labour** | **Nicholas Robert Crofts** | **2,443** | **71.39** | **▲12.84** |
| Liberal Democrats | Norman Mills | 448 | 13.09 | ▼21.41 |
| Green | Anthony John Christian | 193 | 5.64 | ▲3.51 |
| Conservative | Pauline Ann Shuttleworth | 145 | 4.24 | ▲0.79 |
| Liberal | Majorie Peel | 97 | 2.83 | ▲1.46 |
| TUSC | John Gary Marston | 96 | 2.81 | N/A |
| Majority | | 1995 | 58.30 | ▲34.25 |
| Turnout | | 3422 | 34.70 | ▼7.74 |
| Labour **gain** from Liberal Democrats | | Swing | +17.13 | |

Liverpool City Council Municipal Elections 2011: Thursday 5 May 2011
| Party | Candidate | Votes | % | ±% |
|---|---|---|---|---|
| **Labour** | **Hayley Todd** | **2,442** | **58.55** | **▲7.14** |
| Liberal Democrats | Paul Twigger | 1,439 | 34.50 | ▼4.40 |
| Conservative | James Robert Ellis | 144 | 3.45 | ▲0.02 |
| Green | Theresa Anne Larkins | 89 | 2.13 | ▲0.04 |
| Liberal | Majorie Peel | 57 | 1.37 | ▼2.80 |
| Majority | | 1,003 | 24.05 | ▲11.54 |
| Turnout | | 4,171 | 42.44 | ▼17.35 |
| Labour **gain** from Liberal Democrats | | Swing | 5.77% | |

Liverpool City Council Municipal Elections 2010: Thursday 6 May 2010
| Party | Candidate | Votes | % | ±% |
|---|---|---|---|---|
| **Labour** | **Jacqui Nasuh** | **3,044** | **51.41** | **▲6.29** |
| Liberal Democrats | Elizabeth Frances Parr | 2,303 | 38.90 | ▼7.20 |
| Liberal | Patricia Margaret Elmour | 247 | 4.17 | N/A |
| Conservative | June Hilda Brandwood | 203 | 3.43 | ▼1.76 |
| Green | Eveline Johanna Van Der Steen | 124 | 2.09 | ▼1.50 |
| Majority | | 741 | 12.51 | ▲11.53 |
| Turnout | | 5,921 | 59.79 | |
| Labour **gain** from Liberal Democrats | | Swing | +6.75 | |

=== Elections of the 2000s ===
Liverpool City Council Municipal Elections 2008: Thursday 1 May 2008
| Party | Candidate | Votes | % | ±% |
|---|---|---|---|---|
| **Liberal Democrats** | **David Irving** | **1,642** | **46.10** | **▼5.05** |
| Labour | Anthony Conception | 1,607 | 45.12 | ▲5.06 |
| Conservative | Geoffrey Elsmore Brandwood | 185 | 5.19 | ▲1.94 |
| Green | James Edward Munro | 128 | 3.59 | ▲1.08 |
| Majority | | 35 | 0.98 | ▼10.11 |
| Turnout | | 3,562 | 35.33 | |
| Liberal Democrats **hold** | | Swing | -5.05 | |

Liverpool City Council Municipal Elections 2007: Thursday 3 May 2007
| Party | Candidate | Votes | % | ±% |
|---|---|---|---|---|
| **Liberal Democrats** | **Paul Twigger** | **1,794** | **51.15** | **▲7.02** |
| Labour | Anthony Concepcion | 1,405 | 40.06 | ▼0.61 |
| Conservative | Michael Lind | 144 | 3.25 | ▼2.78 |
| Liberal | Terry Formby | 106 | 3.02 | ▼5.29 |
| Green | Helen Rawlinson | 88 | 2.51 | ▲2.51 |
| Majority | | 389 | 11.09 | |
| Turnout | | 3,507 | 34.65 | |
| Liberal Democrats **hold** | | Swing | 3.82 | |

Liverpool City Council Municipal Elections 2006: 4 May 2006
| Party | Candidate | Votes | % | ±% |
|---|---|---|---|---|
| **Liberal Democrats** | **Josie Mullen** | **1,275** | **44.13** | |
| Labour | Anthony Concepcion | 1,175 | 40.67 | |
| Liberal | Andrew Charles Donaldson | 240 | 8.31 | |
| Conservative | Michael Lind | 199 | 6.89 | |
| Majority | | | | |
| Turnout | | 2,889 | 27.77 | |
| Liberal Democrats **hold** | | Swing | | |

After the boundary change of 2004 the whole of Liverpool City Council faced election. Three Councillors were returned.

Liverpool City Council Municipal Elections 2004: Thursday 10 June 2004
| Party | Candidate | Votes | % | ±% |
|---|---|---|---|---|
| **Liberal Democrats** | **David Irving** | **1,907** | | |
| Liberal Democrats | Christopher Newby | 1,880 | | |
| Liberal Democrats | Josephine Mullen | 1,732 | | |
| Labour | Brenda McGrath | 1,179 | | |
| Labour | Peter Killeen | 1,156 | | |
| Labour | Peter Davidson | 1,095 | | |
| Liberal | Andrew Donaldson | 310 | | |
| Conservative | Duncan Phillips | 225 | | |
| Liberal | Elain Tyler | 216 | | |
| Majority | | | | |
| Turnout | | 3799 | 36.24% | |
| Liberal Democrats **win** (new seat) | | | | |
| Liberal Democrats **win** (new seat) | | | | |
| Liberal Democrats **win** (new seat) | | | | |

Italics – Denotes sitting Councillor.
Bold – Denotes the winning candidate.
