= 2010 Liverpool City Council election =

2010 UK local government election

- 6 May 2010

30 seats were up for election (one third): one seat for each of the 90 wards 46 seats needed for a majority
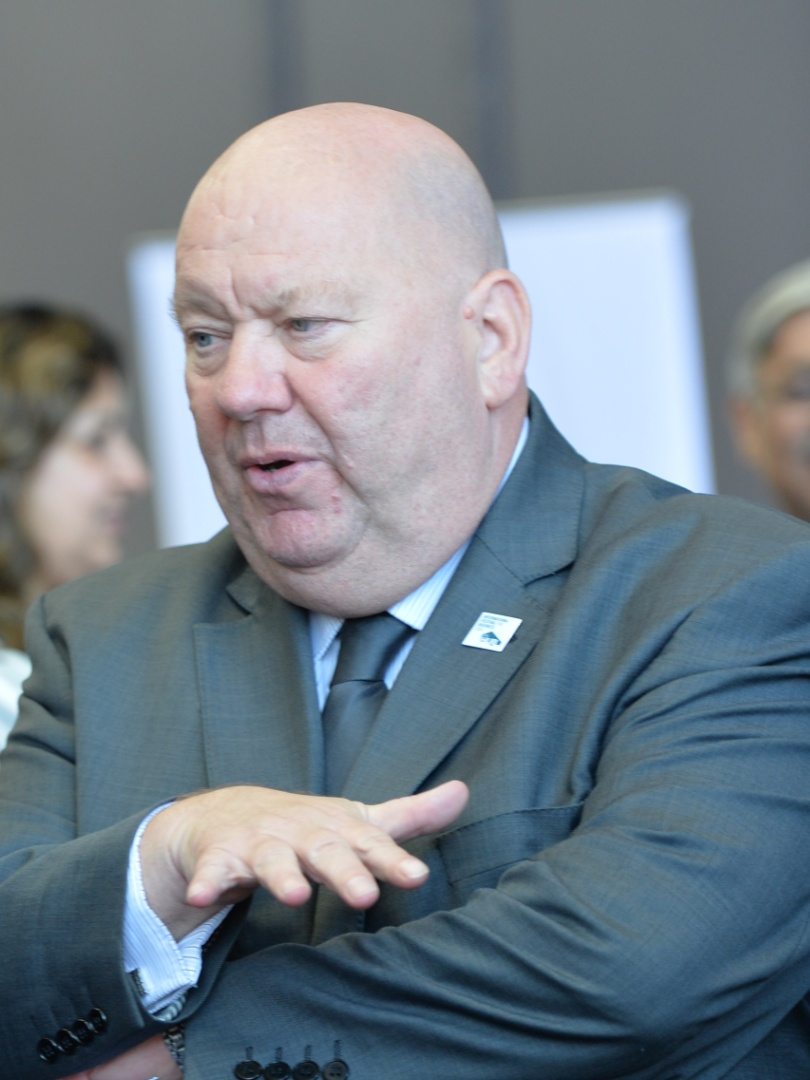
	First party	Second party	Third party
Leader	Joe Anderson	Warren Bradley
Party	Labour	Liberal Democrats	Green
Seats won	16		1
Seat change	▲	▼12	±0
Popular vote	35,082
Percentage	41%	%	%
Swing	▲%	▼%	▼%
	Fourth party
Party	Liberal
Seats won	1
Seat change	±0
Percentage	%
Swing	▼%
Leader of Largest Party before election
Labour
Subsequent Leader of Largest Party
Labour

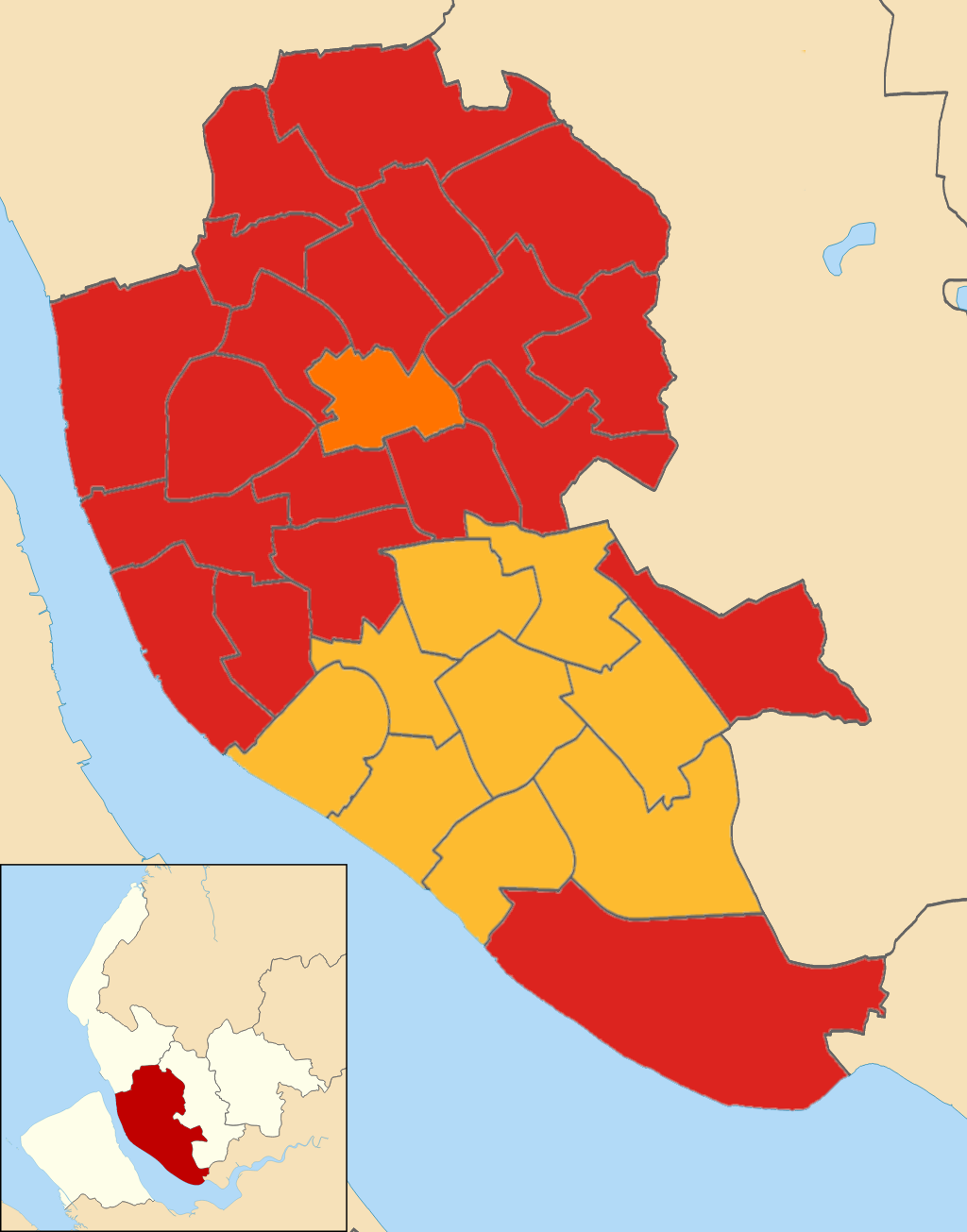
2010 local election results in Liverpool

Elections to Liverpool City Council were held on 6 May 2010. One third of the council was up for election. (30 seats)

As Liverpool Council is elected in thirds, councillors elected in the 2006 elections defend their seats this year, and the vote share changes are compared on that basis.

After the election, the composition of the council was:

Party	Seats	±
Labour	47	+8
Liberal Democrat	38	-8
Liberal	3	0
Green	1	-1

== Election result ==
Liverpool local election result 2010
Party	Seats	Gains	Losses	Net gain/loss	Seats %	Votes %	Votes	+/−
Liberal Democrats	9	1	9	-8	33.33%	29.80%	53,193	
Labour	20	8	0	+8	66.6%	52.10%	93,004	
Liberal	1	0	0	0	3.2%	5.95%	10,624	
Green	0	0	1	-1	0%	4.66%	8,312	
Conservative	0	0	0	0	0%	7.33%	13,092	
BNP	0	0	0	0	0%	1.34%	2,394	
Independent	0	0	0	0	0%	0.13%	238	
Socialist Labour	0	0	0	0	0%	0.21%	370	

== Ward results ==
Changes in vote share are compared with the corresponding elections in 2006.

* – Retiring Councillor

=== Allerton and Hunts Cross ===
Allerton & Hunts Cross
Party	Candidate	Votes	%	±%
Liberal Democrats	Vera Best *	3,148	43.95	−5.7%
Labour	Colin McAlley	2,750	38.3	+17.3
Conservative	Adam Marsden	1,010	14.1	−2.9
Green	Margaret Williams	270	3.8	−2.7
Majority		398		
Registered electors		11,085		
Turnout		7,178	64.75	+34.8
Rejected ballots		29		
Liberal Democrats hold		Swing		

=== Anfield ===
Anfield
Party	Candidate	Votes	%	±%
Labour	Ian Francis	2,817	54.5%	+22.8%
Liberal Democrats	Ann Kendrick	1,526	29.5	−12.8
BNP	Karen Otty	278	5.4	N/A
Liberal	Stephen Houghland	274	5.3	−11.9
Conservative	Brenda Copell	185	3.6	−0.1
Green	Jean Hill	88	1.7	−3.4
Majority		1,291		
Registered electors		9,531		
Turnout		5,168	54.2	+31.2
Rejected ballots		18		
Labour gain from Liberal Democrats		Swing		

=== Belle Vale ===
Belle Vale
Party	Candidate	Votes	%	±%
Labour	Pauline Walton *	3,811	61.5%	+9.8%
Liberal Democrats	Ian Phillips	1,963	31.7	−10.6
Conservative	Stephen Fitxsimmons	287	4.6	+2.0
Green	Julie Birch-Holt	141	2.3	N/A
Majority		1,848		
Registered electors		10,642		
Turnout		6,202	58.3	+26.3
Rejected ballots		34		
Labour hold		Swing		

=== Central ===
Central
Party	Candidate	Votes	%	±%
Labour	Nick Small *	2,084	53.2%	−0.1%
Liberal Democrats	Richard Marbrow	1,107	20.3	−9.0
Conservative	Thomas Roberts	410	10.5	+2.9
Green	Fiona Coyne	237	6.1	−1.6
Liberal	John Gannon	81	2.1	+0.0
Majority		977	25.0	+1.0
Registered electors		12,031		
Turnout		3,919	32.6	+20.6
Rejected ballots				
Labour hold		Swing		

=== Childwall ===
Childwall
Party	Candidate	Votes	%	±%
Liberal Democrats	Pat Moloney	3,162	42.3%	−19.6%
Labour	Rosemary Connell	2,900	38.8	+19.2
Conservative	Jade Adamowicz	661	8.8	+0.1
Liberal	Philip Daley	537	7.2	+4.6
Green	Pierre Van Der Vorst	222	3.0	−4.2
Majority		262	3.5	−38.8
Registered electors		11,116		
Turnout		7,482	67.3	+37.3
Rejected ballots		64		
Liberal Democrats hold		Swing		

=== Church ===
Church
Party	Candidate	Votes	%	±%
Liberal Democrats	Tom Morrison	3,171	45.91%	−14.3%
Labour	Peter Clarke	2,074	30.0	+16.9
Conservative	James Barnaby	702	10.2	+2.6
Liberal	James MacGregor	556	8.1	+4.9
Green	Eleanor Martin	404	5.9	−2.8
Independent	Jeffrey Berman	152	2.2	−5.0
Majority		1.097	15.9	+8.7
Registered electors		10,836		
Turnout		7,059	65.1	+30.9
Rejected ballots		49		
Liberal Democrats hold		Swing		

=== Clubmoor ===
Clubmoor
Party	Candidate	Votes	%	±%
Labour	Roz Gladden *	4,245	73.9%	+25.3%
Liberal	David Maher	1,073	18.7	−8.0
BNP	Peter Squire	364	6.33	N/A
Conservative	Victoria MacDonald	281	4.9	+0.4
Green	Mark Bacon	148	2.6	−1.4
Majority		4,425		
Registered electors		11,618		
Turnout		6,111	52.6	+27.6
Rejected ballots		20		
Labour hold		Swing		

=== County ===
County
Party	Candidate	Votes	%	±%
Labour	Gerard Woodhouse	3,131	63.4%	+22.1%
Liberal Democrats	Ruth Gould	1,591	32.2	−20.5
BNP	Peter Stafford	222	4.5	N/A
Conservative	Angela Oates	156	3.2	+0.4
Green	Tony Jones	61	1.2	N/A
Majority		1,540		
Registered electors		9,771		
Turnout		5,161	52.8	+28.8
Rejected ballots		19		
Labour gain from Liberal Democrats		Swing		

=== Cressington ===
Cressington
Party	Candidate	Votes	%	±%
Liberal Democrats	Richard Oglethorpe *	3,127	44.3%	−8.2%
Labour	Anna Briggs	2,635	37.3	+15.3
Conservative	Paul Athans	952	13.5	+2.7
Green	Mark Bowman	294	4.2	−4.1
Liberal	Michael Williams	50	0.7	−5.7
Majority		492		
Registered electors		11,240		
Turnout		7,058	62.8	+31.8
Rejected ballots		37		
Liberal Democrats hold		Swing		

=== Croxteth ===
Croxteth
Party	Candidate	Votes	%	±%
Labour	Peter Mitchell	3,307	59.6%	+1.9
Liberal Democrats	Mark Coughlin	1,711	30.8	+0.1
Conservative	G Tyldsley	271	4.9	−0.2
Socialist Labour	Kai Anderson	244	4.4	N/A
Liberal	Michael Morgan	181	3.3	+0.7
Green	Don Ross	78	1.4	−3.7
Majority		1,596		
Registered electors		10,604		
Turnout		5,792	54.6	+26.6
Rejected ballots		73		
Labour hold		Swing		

=== Everton ===
Everton
Party	Candidate	Votes	%	±%
Labour	John McIntosh *	3,623	79.3%	+10.5%
Liberal	Linda Roberts	532	11.7	+6.4
BNP	Jackie Stafford	281	6.15	N/A
Conservative	James Rogers	278	11.7	+5.4
Green	Raphael Levy	134	2.9	−3.3
Majority		3,623	66.7	+11.3
Registered electors		9,908		
Turnout		4,848	48.93	+28.9
Rejected ballots		23		
Labour hold		Swing		

=== Fazakerley ===
Fazakerley
Party	Candidate	Votes	%	±%
Labour	Dave Hanratty *	4,250	68.0%	−19.9%
Liberal Democrats	Graham Seddon	1,415	22.6	−21.6
Conservative	Paul Barber	324	5.2	+1.5
BNP	Peter Stafford	292	4.7	N/A
Liberal	Irene Mayes	187	3.0	−1.0
Green	Edward Gommon	75	1.2	N/A
Majority		2,835	45.4	
Registered electors		11,363		
Turnout		6,534	57.6	+31.6
Rejected ballots		30		
Labour hold		Swing		

=== Greenbank ===
Greenbank
Party	Candidate	Votes	%	±%
Liberal Democrats	Elaine Allen	2,530	41.8%	+1.0%
Labour	Laura Robertson-Collins	2,039	33.7	+8.7
Green	Peter Cranie	800	13.2	−6.1
Conservative	Christopher Hall	562	9.3	−0.5
Liberal	Terence Formby	119	2.0	−3.2
Majority		491	8.1	−7.7
Registered electors		10,728		
Turnout		6,050	56.4	+33.4
Rejected ballots		22		
Liberal Democrats hold		Swing		

=== Kensington & Fairfield ===
Kensington & Fairfield
Party	Candidate	Votes	%	±%
Labour	Louise Baldock *	2,949	62.1%	+17.1%
Liberal Democrats	Frank Doran	1,379	29.0%	−9.2%
Green	Michael Ryan	179	3.8%	−2.3%
Conservative	Ann Nugent	139	2.9%	−0.6%
Liberal	Shelly Harrison	107	2.3%	−4.9%
Majority		1,570	33.0%	+26.2%
Registered electors		8,891		
Turnout		4,753	53.5%	+29.5%
Rejected ballots		15		
Labour hold		Swing		

=== Kirkdale ===
Kirkdale
Party	Candidate	Votes	%	±%
Labour	Malcolm Kennedy	4,284	85.7%	+7.5%
BNP	Steven Greenhalgh	403	8.1%	N/A
Liberal	George Roberts	336	6.7%	N/A
Conservative	Nigel Barber	246	4.9%	+2.1%
Green	Jonathan Clatworthy	133	2.7%	+0.1%
Independent	Will Thomson	86	1.7%	N/A
Majority		4,284		
Registered electors		11,358		
Turnout		5,488	48.3%	
Rejected ballots		35		
Labour hold		Swing		

=== Knotty Ash ===
Knotty Ash
Party	Candidate	Votes	%	±%
Labour	Jacqui Nasuh	3,044	51.4%	+10.7%
Liberal Democrats	Elizabeth Parr	2,303	38.9%	−5.2%
Liberal	Patricia Elmour	247	4.2%	−4.1%
Conservative	June Brandwood	203	3.4%	−3.5%
Green	Eveline Van der Steen	124	2.1%	N/A
Majority		741		
Registered electors		9,903		
Turnout		5,921	59.8%	+31.8%
Rejected ballots		16		
Labour gain from Liberal Democrats		Swing		

=== Mossley Hill ===
Mossley Hill
Party	Candidate	Votes	%	±%
Liberal Democrats	Tina Gould *	3,171	46.7%	−8.8%
Labour	Christopher Helm	2,351	33.9%	+15.9%
Conservative	Giselle McDonald	909	13.1%	+2.0%
Green	Robert Smith	418	6.02%	−4.7%
Liberal	David Wood	97	1.4%	−3.3%
Majority		820		
Registered electors		10,668		
Turnout		6,946	65.1%	+33.1%
Rejected ballots		35		
Liberal Democrats hold		Swing		

=== Norris Green ===
Norris Green
Party	Candidate	Votes	%	±%
Labour	Vi Bebb *	3,948	80.6%	+21.4%
Liberal	Charles Mayes	550	11.2%	+7.0%
BNP	John Edgar	312	6.4%	−11.4%
Conservative	George Powell	308	6.3%	+0.01%
Green	Elspeth Anwar	93	1.9%	+2.2%
Socialist Labour	Kim Singleton	40	0.8%	N/A
Majority		3,948		
Registered electors		10,224		
Turnout		5,251	51.4%	+30.4%
Rejected ballots		24		
Labour hold		Swing		

=== Old Swan ===
Old Swan
Party	Candidate	Votes	%	±%
Labour	Joanne Anderson	3,557	55.4%	+26.4%
Liberal Democrats	Keith Turner	2,341	36.5%	−11.9%
BNP	Steven McEllenborough	242	3.78%	N/A
Conservative	Gwynneth Hicklin	231	3.6%	−1.4%
Green	Vikki Gregorich	194	3.0%	−1.5%
Liberal	Elaine Tyrer	100	1.6%	−4.2%
Majority		1,216		
Registered electors		11,283		
Turnout		6,423	56.9%	+32.9%
Rejected ballots		48		
Labour gain from Liberal Democrats		Swing		

=== Picton ===
Picton
Party	Candidate	Votes	%	±%
Labour	Timothy Beaumont	2,937	54.4%	+19.6%
Liberal Democrats	Laurence Sidorczuk *	1,786	33.1%	−16.6%
Green	Ian Harvey	198	3.7%	−3.4%
Liberal	Griffith Parry	251	4.7%	−3.9%
Conservative	Pauline Shuttleworth	225	4.2%	N/A
Majority		1,151		
Registered electors		10,832		
Turnout		5,397	49.8%	+28.8%
Rejected ballots		35		
Labour gain from Liberal Democrats		Swing		

=== Princes Park ===
Princes Park
Party	Candidate	Votes	%	±%
Labour	Anna Rothery	2,740	53.4%	+8.9%
Liberal Democrats	Mumin Khan	1,293	25.2	+1.0
Green	Abdullahi Mahmoud	634	12.4	−4.5
Conservative	Dianne Watson	294	5.8	+2.2
Liberal	Thomas Peel	166	3.2	−4.5
Majority		1,447		
Registered electors		10,008		
Turnout		5,127	51.2%	+27.2%
Rejected ballots		48		
Labour hold		Swing		

=== Riverside ===
Riverside
Party	Candidate	Votes	%	±%
Labour	Joe Anderson *	3,978	67.5%	+1.5%
Liberal Democrats	Reg Standish	1,022	17.3%	+6.0%
Conservative	Alma McGing	420	7.1%	−1.6%
Green	Lewis Coyne	281	4.8%	
Liberal	Maria Langley	193	3.27%	−2.8%
Majority		2,956		
Registered electors		11,598		
Turnout		5,896	50.8%	+23.3
Rejected ballots		25		
Labour hold		Swing		

=== St. Michael's ===
St Michael's
Party	Candidate	Votes	%	±%
Liberal Democrats	Sharon Green	2,002	34.0%	−7.5%
Green	Tom Crone	1,790	30.4%	+5.2%
Labour	Matthew Garlick	1,710	29.0%	+4.0%
Conservative	David Patmore	394	6.7%	−1.7%
Majority		292		
Registered electors		10,054		
Turnout		5,896	58.6%	+32.6%
Rejected ballots		39		
Liberal Democrats hold		Swing		

=== Speke-Garston ===
Speke-Garston
Party	Candidate	Votes	%	±%
Labour	Doreen Knight *	4,847	80.6%	+21.3%
Liberal Democrats	Rachel Oelbaum	432	7.2%	−24.3%
Conservative	Norman Coppell	386	6.42%	+3.4%
Liberal	John Pagan	141	2.3%	+0.0%
Green	Helen McAlister	209	3.5%	−0.4%
Majority		4,415		
Registered electors		12,683		
Turnout		6,015	47.4%	+20.4%
Rejected ballots		66		
Labour hold		Swing		

=== Tuebrook & Stoneycroft ===
Tuebrook & Stoneycroft
Party	Candidate	Votes	%	±%
Liberal	Chris Lenton *	3,523	59.3%	−1.3%
Labour	Dan Barrington	2,041	34.3%	+10.3%
Green	Natalie Clark	190	3.2%	N/A
Conservative	Prashant Singh	190	3.2%	−0.5%
Majority		1,482		
Registered electors		10,474		
Turnout		5,944	56.8%	+34.8%
Rejected ballots		18		
Liberal hold		Swing		

=== Warbreck ===
Warbreck
Party	Candidate	Votes	%	±%
Labour	Maria McEvoy	3,761	58.7%	+14.4%
Liberal Democrats	Richard Roberts	2,238	34.9%	−10.3%
Conservative	David Jeffrey	248	3.9%	−0.5%
Green	Eleanor Pontin	161	2.5%	N/A
Majority		1.523		
Registered electors		11,278		
Turnout		6,408	56.8%	+29.8%
Rejected ballots		46		
Labour gain from Liberal Democrats		Swing		

=== Wavertree ===
Wavertree
Party	Candidate	Votes	%	±%
Liberal Democrats	Rosie Jolly	3,118	46.9%	−17.6%
Labour	Tony Murphy	2,454	36.9%	+18.4%
Green	Elizabeth Pascoe	350	5.3%	−3.4%
Conservative	Christopher Clinton	338	5.1%	+0.4%
Liberal	Mary Jane Canning	383	5.8%	+2.2%
Majority		664		
Registered electors		10,452		
Turnout		6,643	63.6%	+35.6%
Rejected ballots		4		
Liberal Democrats hold		Swing		

=== West Derby ===
West Derby
Party	Candidate	Votes	%	±%
Labour	Pam Thomas	3,391	48.1%	+25.3%
Liberal Democrats	Stuart Monkcom *	2,326	33.0%	−16.5%
Liberal	Ann Hines	674	9.6%	+1.8%
Conservative	Andrew Desborough	567	8.0%	−2.8%
Green	Martin Randall	91	1.3%	−5.8%
Majority		1,065	15.1%	
Registered electors		10,960		
Turnout		7,049	64.3%	+39.3%
Rejected ballots		10		
Labour gain from Liberal Democrats		Swing		

=== Woolton ===
Woolton
Party	Candidate	Votes	%	±%
Liberal Democrats	Malcolm Kelly *	3,543	50.6%	−5.7%
Labour	John Fulham	1,728	24.8%	+11.6
Conservative	Richard Downey	1,500	21.5%	−0.1%
Green	Alexander Rudkin	197	2.8%	−2.6%
Majority		1.815	26.05%	
Registered electors		10,467		
Turnout		6,968	66.6%	+33.3%
Rejected ballots		26		
Liberal Democrats hold		Swing		

=== Yew Tree ===
Yew Tree
Party	Candidate	Votes	%	±%
Labour	Tony Conception	3,618	58.3%	+16.4%
Liberal Democrats	Gary Airey	1,788	28.8%	−13.6%
Conservative	Matthew Taylor	415	6.7%	−1.2%
Liberal	Tracey Hawksford	266	4.3%	−3.4%
Green	Will Ward	118	1.9%	N/A
Socialist Labour	Barbara Bryan	131	2.1%	N/A
Majority		1,830	29.5%	
Registered electors		11,344		
Turnout				
Rejected ballots		36		
Labour gain from Liberal Democrats		Swing		

== By-elections ==
=== Croxteth, 18 November 2010 ===
Following the death of Cllr Rose Bailey and the resignation of Cllr Phil Moffat a dual by-election was held on 18 November 2010. Two candidates were returned:

Croxteth By-Election 18 November 2010
Party	Candidate	Votes	%	±%
Labour	Martin Cummins	1447	31.85%	
Labour	Stephanie Till	1424	31.34%	
Liberal Democrats	Mark Coughlin	611	13.45%	
Liberal Democrats	Michael Marner	479	10.54%	
Socialist Labour	Kai Andersen	135	2.97%	
BNP	Peter Tierney	117	2.58%	
Socialist Labour	Barbara Bryan	70	1.54%	
Green	Eleanor Pontin	63	1.39%	
UKIP	Tony Hammond	50	1.10%	
English Democrat	Paul Rimmer	35	0.77%	
English Democrat	Steven McEllenborough	33	0.73%	
Conservative	Norman Coppell	31	0.68%	
Conservative	Brenda Coppell	29	0.64%	
UKIP	Michael Lane	19	0.42%	
Majority				
Turnout		4543	21.42%	
Labour hold		Swing		
Labour gain from Liberal Democrats		Swing		
