= The Greenbank Project (charity) =

Disability organisation in Liverpool, England

Greenbank
- The Greenbank Project
- Formation: 2 February 1983
- Founder: Gerry Kinsella
- Type: Registered charity and company limited by guarantee
- Registration no.: Charity number 513814; company number 01696490
- Location: Greenbank Lane, Liverpool, England
- Services: Education & Sport and Leisure opportunities
- Chief executive: Mary Beaumont
- Website: www.greenbank.org.uk

The Greenbank Project, is a charity in Liverpool, England, which operates the Greenbank Sports Academy and the neighbouring Greenbank College. It works to provide opportunities in employment, education, sport and leisure for disabled people and disadvantaged groups.

The Greenbank Project's current chief executive is Mary Beaumont.

== Founding ==
Greenbank was founded by Gerry Kinsella, a former Paralympic athlete who was previously the charity's chief executive. In 1982, Kinsella raised £30,000 to fund the building of the Academy with a sponsored wheelchair push from Land's End to John o' Groats.

The charity has subsequently received funding from the Big Lottery Fund and St James's Place Foundation.

== Sports academy ==
The academy has specially designed facilities for disability sports. It has been used as an Olympic training facility, and as a training camp for teams from Namibia and Romania.

British Paralympic medallist Nathan Maguire first settled on his chosen sport of wheelchair racing, one of the sports Greenbank offers, at the facility when he was 15.

== College ==
Ofsted lists Greenbank Project as an independent learning provider under URN 52037. Its current Ofsted rating is Requires Improvement. The rating followed a full inspection carried out from 11 to 13 June 2024, with the report published on 9 September 2024. Ofsted later carried out a monitoring visit on 21 May 2025, with the report published on 1 July 2025 which stated it had made Insufficient progress in all areas except from one.

Subjects offered include business and administration, customer service, catering, functional skills in English and mathematics, fashion and textiles, hairdressing, information technology and sport.

The college runs a hair and beauty show to showcase its students' work. In previous years it has collaborated on this with LIPA, the Museum of Liverpool, and The Black-E.

== Governance and registration ==
The Greenbank Project is registered with the Charity Commission for England and Wales under charity number 513814. It is also incorporated as a company limited by guarantee under company number 01696490.
