= 2024 Liverpool City Region mayoral election =

2024 UK local government election

- 2 May 2024
- Turnout: 24% (▼5.7%)
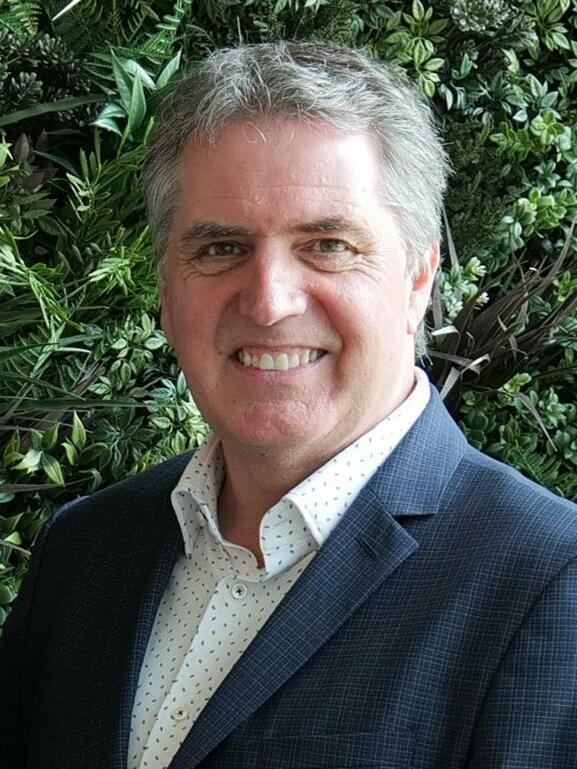
	First party	Second party
Candidate	Steve Rotheram	Jade Marsden
Party	Labour	Conservative
Popular vote	183,932	27,708
Percentage	68.0%	10.2%
Swing	▲9.7pp	▼9.3pp
	Third party	Fourth party
Candidate	Tom Crone	Rob McAllister-Bell
Party	Green	Liberal Democrats
Popular vote	26,417	21,366
Percentage	9.8%	7.9%
Swing	▼2.0pp	▼2.4pp
Mayor before election
Steve Rotheram
Labour
Elected mayor
Steve Rotheram
Labour

The 2024 Liverpool City Region mayoral election was held on 2 May 2024 to elect the mayor of the Liverpool City Region, with results declared on 4 May. The election was part of the 2024 United Kingdom local elections across England and Wales.

Steve Rotheram, of the Labour Party, was re-elected for a third term.

== Background ==
The position of Mayor of the Liverpool City Region was created in 2017 following a devolution deal between the UK government and the Liverpool City Region Combined Authority (LCRCA). The Cities and Local Government Devolution Act 2016 required a directly elected metro mayor for combined authorities to receive additional powers from central government. Under the terms of the devolution deal, the first mayoral term was set to last until 2020, followed by elections every four years. The election originally due to take place in May 2020 was postponed due to the COVID-19 pandemic. The Liverpool City Region is defined as having six boroughs which includes the county of Merseyside (Knowsley, Liverpool, St Helens, Sefton, and Wirral) and the Borough of Halton.

Steve Rotheram, the Labour candidate, won the initial election in 2017 and was re-elected in the delayed 2021 election.

== Electoral system ==
This election was the first to use first-past-the-post to elect the mayor as a result of the changes made by the Elections Act 2022, with the previous elections in 2017 and 2021 using the supplementary vote system. Voters were able to vote for a single candidate, and the candidate who received the most votes will be elected mayor.

All registered electors living in the Liverpool City Region aged 18 or over on 2 May 2024 were entitled to vote in the mayoral election. Those who are temporarily away from the Liverpool City Region (for example, away working, on holiday, in student accommodation or in hospital) were also entitled to vote in the mayoral election. The deadline to register to vote in the election was 16 April 2024.

== Campaign ==
Rotheram, the incumbent Labour mayor, said that if re-elected he would build three new Merseyrail stations across the region by 2030, in Woodchurch, Carr Mill and Daresbury.

Green Party candidate Tom Crone's priorities include "an expanded home insulation program that will save people money on their bills lifting many out of fuel poverty. Training in the green jobs of the future so people are ready to be part of the transition to net zero. And a properly joined up public transport and active travel network making travel easier and cleaner around the city region."

Rob McAllister-Bell, the Liberal Democrats candidate, said he would introduce contactless payment across public transport in the region by 2026. He also promised to give elected politicians more power on the combined authority.

Independent candidate, Ian Smith is an independent councillor in Merseyside. He said he wants the region to be "united, ambitious, egalitarian and environmentally sensitive" and wants inclusivity to be a priority. He set out his vision for the region to focus on innovation and science, and to update the transport network. He also stated his desire to end rough sleeping.

== Candidates ==
=== Labour ===
Steve Rotheram, who has served as mayor of the Liverpool City Region since the inaugural election in 2017, and previously served as Member of Parliament for Liverpool Walton, stood for re-election.

=== Conservatives ===
The Conservative Party re-opened their selection in January 2024 after receiving a single application, from the party's 2021 candidate Jade Marsden. The local party chair sought more candidates given "strong and widespread opposition to Jade Marsden standing for the LCRMM role again given her past performance as a candidate". Marsden was later confirmed as the party's candidate.

=== Green Party ===
Tom Crone, leader of Liverpool Green Party, councillor for St Michael's, and previous mayoral candidate, stood for the Greens.

=== Liberal Democrats ===
Rob McAllister-Bell, deputy leader of the Liberal Democrat group on Liverpool City Council, was announced as the Liberal Democrat candidate in March 2024.

=== Independent ===
Ian Smith stood as an independent candidate. He self-describes as a socialist and campaigns for an immediate ceasefire in the Gaza war.

== Results ==
2024 Liverpool City Region election
Party	Candidate	Votes	%	±%
Labour	Steve Rotheram	183,932	68.0	+9.7
Conservative	Jade Marsden	27,708	10.2	–9.3
Green	Tom Crone	26,417	9.8	–2.0
Liberal Democrats	Rob McAllister-Bell	21,366	7.9	–2.4
Independent	Ian Smith	11,032	4.1	+4.1
Turnout		270,455	24.0	
Labour hold		Swing	+9.5	

== Results by local authority ==
=== Knowsley ===
Liverpool City Region Mayoral Election 2024, Knowsley
Party	Candidate	Votes	%
Labour	Steve Rotheram	19,351	74.6
Green	Tom Crone	3,158	12.2
Independent	Ian Smith	1,199	4.6
Conservative	Jade Marsden	1,145	4.4
Liberal Democrats	Rob McAllister-Bell	1,100	4.2
Turnout		25,953	21.6

=== Liverpool ===
Liverpool City Region Mayoral Election 2024, Liverpool
Party	Candidate	Votes	%
Labour	Steve Rotheram	54,714	71.5
Green	Tom Crone	8,014	10.5
Liberal Democrats	Rob McAllister-Bell	7,679	10.0
Conservative	Jade Marsden	3,381	4.4
Independent	Ian Smith	2,765	3.6
Turnout		76,553	22.9

=== St Helens ===
Liverpool City Region Mayoral Election 2024, St Helens
Party	Candidate	Votes	%
Labour	Steve Rotheram	17,572	66.4
Conservative	Jade Marsden	3,195	12.1
Green	Tom Crone	2,455	9.3
Liberal Democrats	Rob McAllister-Bell	1,818	6.9
Independent	Ian Smith	1,424	5.4
Turnout		26,671	19.2

=== Wirral ===
Liverpool City Region Mayoral Election 2024, Wirral
Party	Candidate	Votes	%
Labour	Steve Rotheram	38,194	63.2
Conservative	Jade Marsden	9,372	15.5
Green	Tom Crone	7,065	11.7
Liberal Democrats	Rob McAllister-Bell	4,089	6.8
Independent	Ian Smith	1,684	2.8
Turnout		60,839	24.7
