= Runcorn (disambiguation) =

Runcorn is a town in England.

Runcorn may also refer to:

- 4570 Runcorn, a minor planet
- Keith Runcorn (1922–1995), geophysicist
- Runcorn (UK Parliament constituency)
- Runcorn railway station in the English town
- Runcorn Glacier in Antarctica
- Runcorn, Queensland, a suburb of Brisbane, Australia
- Runcorn Urban District, a former local government district in Cheshire, England
- Runcorn Rural District, a former local government district in Cheshire, England

== See also ==
- Runcorn Bridge (disambiguation)
