= 2018 Liverpool City Council election =

2018 UK local government election

- 3 May 2018

31 of 90 seats (One Third and one by-election) to Liverpool City Council 46 seats needed for a majority
- Turnout: 28.9% (▼2.1%)
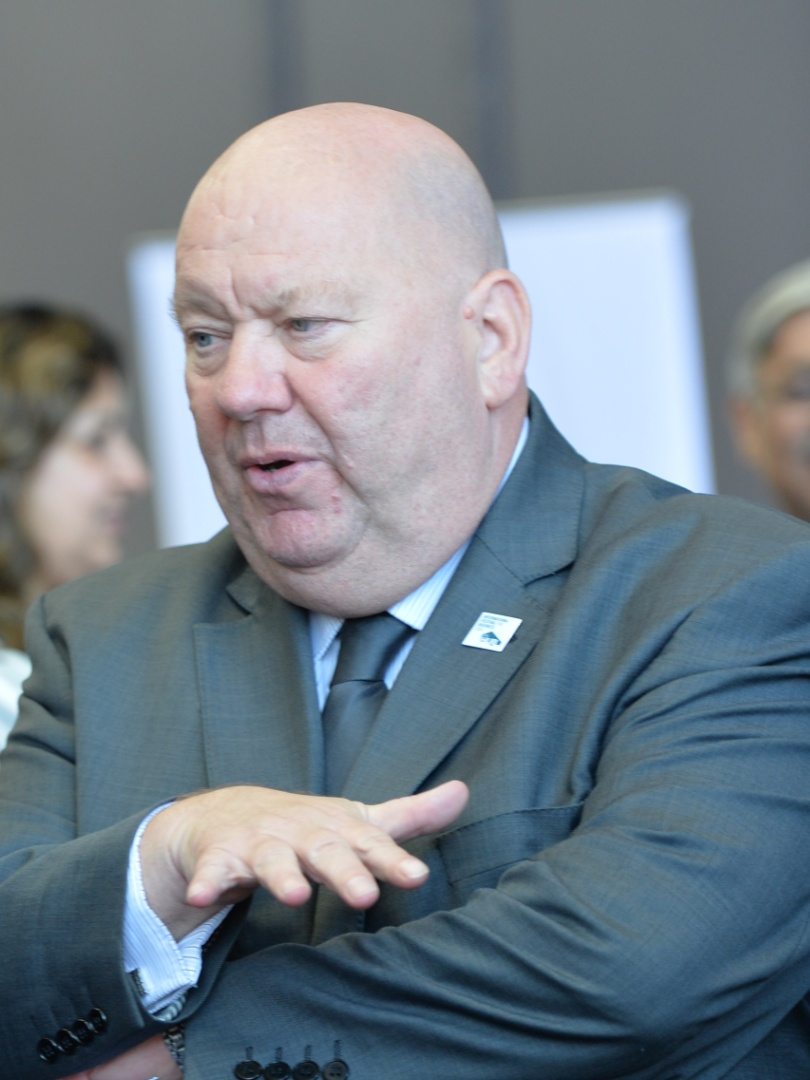

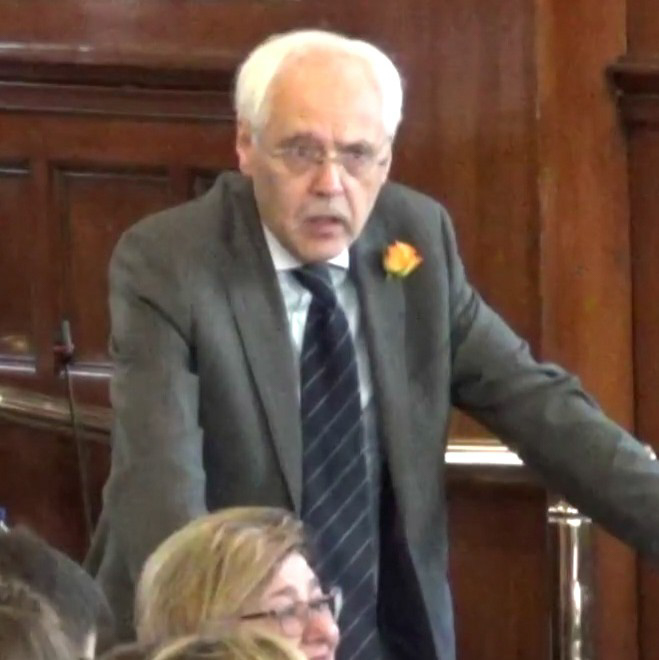

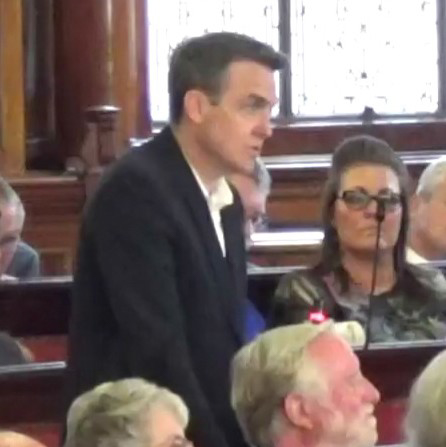

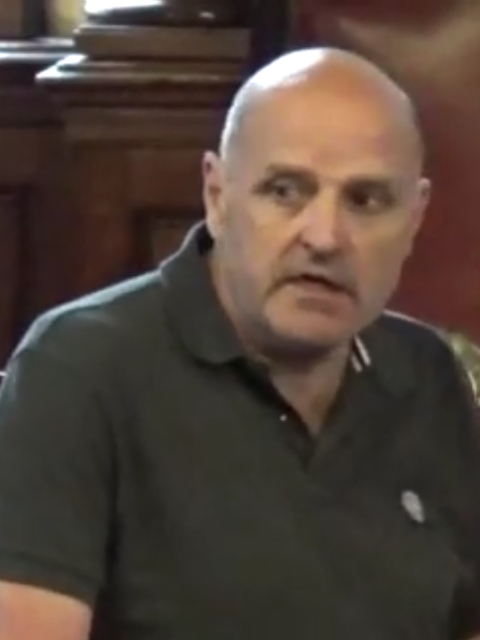
| | First party | Second party |
|---|---|---|
| Leader | Joe Anderson | Richard Kemp |
| Party | Labour | Liberal Democrats |
| Leader's seat | N/A, Mayor | Church |
| Last election | 27 seats, 57.7% | 3 seats, 16.7% |
| Seats before | 79 | 4 |
| Seats won | 25 | 3 |
| Seats after | 76 | 7 |
| Seat change | ▼3 | ▲3 |
| Popular vote | 60,277 | 15,673 |
| Percentage | 63.8% | 16.6% |
| Swing | ▲6.1% | ▼0.1% |
| | Third party | Fourth party |
| Leader | Tom Crone | Steve Radford |
| Party | Green | Liberal |
| Leader's seat | St Michael's | Tuebrook and Stoneycroft |
| Last election | 1 seat, 10.7% | 1 seat, 5.2% |
| Seats before | 4 | 2 |
| Seats won | 2 | 1 |
| Seats after | 4 | 2 |
| Seat change | Steady | Steady |
| Popular vote | 8,839 | 3,932 |
| Percentage | 9.4% | 4.2% |
| Swing | ▼1.3% | ▼1.0% |
- Map of results of 2018 election
Control of Council before election
Joe Anderson
Labour
Control of Council after Election
Joe Anderson
Labour

The 2018 Liverpool City Council election took place on 3 May 2018 to elect members of Liverpool City Council in England. This was on the same day as other local elections.

== Council composition ==
Prior to the election the composition of the council was:

↓
| 79 | 4 | 4 | 2 | 1 |
| Lab | LD | G | L | I |

After the election the composition of the council was:

↓
| 76 | 7 | 4 | 2 | 1 |
| Lab | LD | G | L | I |

== Election results ==
=== Overall election result ===
Overall result compared with 2016.

Liverpool City Council election result, 2018
| Party | Candidates | | | | | | Votes | | |
| Party | Stood | Elected | Gained | Unseated | Net | % of total | % | No. | Net % |
|---|---|---|---|---|---|---|---|---|---|
| Labour | 31 | 25 | 0 | 3 | ▼3 | 80.0 | 63.8 | 60,277 | ▲6.1 |
| Liberal Democrats | 31 | 3 | 3 | 0 | ▲3 | 10.0 | 16.6 | 15,673 | ▼0.1 |
| Green | 31 | 2 | 0 | 0 | Steady | 6.7 | 9.4 | 8,839 | ▼1.3 |
| Conservative | 31 | 0 | 0 | 0 | Steady | 0.0 | 5.4 | 5,088 | ▲1.1 |
| Liberal | 18 | 1 | 0 | 0 | Steady | 3.3 | 4.2 | 3,932 | ▼1.0 |
| Independent | 2 | 0 | 0 | 0 | Steady | 0.0 | 0.3 | 253 | ▲0.1 |
| TUSC | 2 | 0 | 0 | 0 | Steady | 0.0 | 0.2 | 197 | ▼1.8 |
| Old Swan Against the Cuts | 1 | 0 | 0 | 0 | Steady | 0.0 | 0.2 | 157 | ▼0.2 |

(Note: % of total refers to % of wards won.)

== Ward results ==
=== Allerton and Hunts Cross ===
Allerton and Hunts Cross
| Party | Candidate | Votes | % | ±% |
|---|---|---|---|---|
| Labour | Kimberley Berry | 1,885 | 44.3 | ▲7.8 |
| Liberal Democrats | Steve Brauner | 1,811 | 42.6 | ▼4.6 |
| Conservative | Denise Nuttall | 325 | 7.6 | ▼0.3 |
| Green | Maggi Williams | 232 | 5.5 | ▼1.0 |
| Majority | | 74 | 1.7 | N/A |
| Registered electors | | 11,589 | | |
| Turnout | | 4,259 | 36.8 | ▼2.8 |
| Rejected ballots | | 6 | 0.1 | ▼1.0 |
| Labour hold | | Swing | ▲6.2 | |

=== Anfield ===
Anfield
| Party | Candidate | Votes | % | ±% |
|---|---|---|---|---|
| Labour | Billy Marrat | 1,777 | 80.0 | ▲4.7 |
| Conservative | Christopher Smith | 140 | 6.3 | ▲2.1 |
| Liberal Democrats | Wiebke Rüterjans | 134 | 6.0 | ▲0.4 |
| Green | Rachel Burcher | 114 | 5.1 | ▼0.5 |
| Liberal | James Richardson | 56 | 2.5 | ▼3.7 |
| Majority | | 1,721 | 73.7 | ▲4.6 |
| Registered electors | | 9,212 | | |
| Turnout | | 2,228 | 24.2 | ▲0.3 |
| Rejected ballots | | 7 | 0.3 | ▼0.4 |
| Labour hold | | Swing | ▲2.3 | |

=== Belle Vale ===
Belle Vale
| Party | Candidate | Votes | % | ±% |
|---|---|---|---|---|
| Labour | Pauline Walton | 2,574 | 82.6 | ▲17.6 |
| Liberal Democrats | Stephen Atkinson | 227 | 7.3 | ▼4.1 |
| Conservative | Wendy Hine | 181 | 5.8 | ▲2.0 |
| Green | Hilary McDonagh | 94 | 3.0 | ▼3.4 |
| Liberal | Marjorie Peel | 40 | 1.3 | ▼1.4 |
| Majority | | 2,347 | 75.3 | ▲21.7 |
| Registered electors | | 11,547 | | |
| Turnout | | 3,132 | 27.1 | ▲2.5 |
| Rejected ballots | | 16 | 0.5 | ▲0.1 |
| Labour hold | | Swing | ▲10.9 | |

=== Central ===
Central
| Party | Candidate | Votes | % | ±% |
|---|---|---|---|---|
| Labour | Nick Small | 1,066 | 67.9 | ▼1.6 |
| Green | Jayne Clough | 182 | 11.6 | ▼4.7 |
| Liberal Democrats | Greg Howard | 119 | 7.6 | ▲2.2 |
| Conservative | Lee Berry | 118 | 7.5 | ▲1.8 |
| Independent | John Leadbeater | 84 | 5.4 | New |
| Majority | | 884 | 56.3 | ▲3.1 |
| Registered electors | | 9,766 | | |
| Turnout | | 1,572 | 16.1 | ▼0.7 |
| Rejected ballots | | 3 | 0.2 | ▼0.8 |
| Labour hold | | Swing | ▲1.6 | |

=== Childwall ===
Childwall
| Party | Candidate | Votes | % | ±% |
|---|---|---|---|---|
| Liberal Democrats | Carole Storey | 2,200 | 48.6 | ▲19.4 |
| Labour | Frank Hont | 1,956 | 43.2 | ▼9.5 |
| Green | Phil Williamson | 179 | 4.0 | ▼2.5 |
| Conservative | David Jeffery | 150 | 3.3 | ▼1.3 |
| Liberal | Lindsey Wood | 40 | 0.9 | New |
| Majority | | 244 | 5.4 | N/A |
| Registered electors | | 10,804 | | |
| Turnout | | 4,536 | 42.0 | ▲2.6 |
| Rejected ballots | | 11 | 0.2 | ▼1.1 |
| Liberal Democrats gain from Labour | | Swing | ▲14.5 | |

=== Church ===
Church
| Party | Candidate | Votes | % | ±% |
|---|---|---|---|---|
| Liberal Democrats | Liz Makinson | 2,706 | 58.0 | ▲2.2 |
| Labour | Nigel Parsons | 1,474 | 31.6 | ▲3.9 |
| Green | Julie Birch-Holt | 321 | 6.9 | ▼1.3 |
| Conservative | Thomas Burton | 166 | 3.6 | ▲1.0 |
| Majority | | 1,232 | 26.4 | ▼1.7 |
| Registered electors | | 10,594 | | |
| Turnout | | 4,672 | 44.1 | ▼5.5 |
| Rejected ballots | | 5 | 0.1 | ▼0.8 |
| Liberal Democrats gain from Labour | | Swing | ▼0.9 | |

Thomas Burton, the Conservative Party candidate for Church ward was ineligible to sit as a councillor as he was a Liverpool City Council employee.

=== Clubmoor ===
Clubmoor
| Party | Candidate | Votes | % | ±% |
|---|---|---|---|---|
| Labour | Roz Gladden | 2,136 | 83.1 | ▲9.8 |
| Liberal | Paul Jones | 129 | 5.0 | ▼2.1 |
| Conservative | Peter Andrew | 127 | 4.9 | ▲1.2 |
| Green | Esther Cosslett | 104 | 4.0 | ▼4.6 |
| Liberal Democrats | Paul Childs | 75 | 2.9 | ▼4.3 |
| Majority | | 2,007 | 78.1 | ▲13.4 |
| Registered electors | | 11,243 | | |
| Turnout | | 2,583 | 23.0 | ▼3.6 |
| Rejected ballots | | 12 | 0.5 | ▼1.6 |
| Labour hold | | Swing | ▲6.7 | |

=== County ===
County
| Party | Candidate | Votes | % | ±% |
|---|---|---|---|---|
| Labour | Gerard Woodhouse | 2,023 | 86.6 | ▲13.4 |
| Liberal Democrats | Robert McAllister-Bell | 147 | 6.3 | ▼6.5 |
| Conservative | Olivia Lever | 85 | 3.6 | Steady |
| Green | Ceri Jones | 80 | 3.4 | ▼6.2 |
| Majority | | 1,876 | 80.3 | ▲19.9 |
| Registered electors | | 9,427 | | |
| Turnout | | 2,345 | 24.9 | ▼2.2 |
| Rejected ballots | | 10 | 0.4 | ▼1.3 |
| Labour hold | | Swing | ▲8.4 | |

=== Cressington ===
Cressington
| Party | Candidate | Votes | % | ±% |
|---|---|---|---|---|
| Labour | Lynnie Hinnigan | 2,444 | 52.4 | ▲3.8 |
| Liberal Democrats | Norman Mills | 1,566 | 33.6 | ▲3.2 |
| Green | Elke Weissmann | 342 | 7.3 | ▼2.1 |
| Conservative | Jade Marsden | 309 | 6.6 | ▼1.6 |
| Majority | | 878 | 18.8 | ▲0.6 |
| Registered electors | | 11,578 | | |
| Turnout | | 4,665 | 40.3 | ▲1.1 |
| Rejected ballots | | 4 | 0.1 | ▼0.9 |
| Labour hold | | Swing | ▲0.3 | |

=== Croxteth ===
Croxteth
| Party | Candidate | Votes | % | ±% |
|---|---|---|---|---|
| Labour | Peter Mitchell | 2,120 | 82.9 | ▲9.0 |
| Conservative | Alice Day | 172 | 6.7 | ▲3.8 |
| Green | Martin Randall | 99 | 3.9 | ▲0.6 |
| Liberal Democrats | Richard Bentall | 91 | 3.6 | ▼0.9 |
| Liberal | Raymond Catesby | 76 | 3.0 | ▼0.8 |
| Majority | | 1,984 | 76.2 | ▲12.0 |
| Registered electors | | 10,558 | | |
| Turnout | | 2,567 | 24.3 | ▼2.2 |
| Rejected ballots | | 9 | 0.4 | ▼0.9 |
| Labour hold | | Swing | ▲6.0 | |

=== Everton ===
Everton
| Party | Candidate | Votes | % | ±% |
|---|---|---|---|---|
| Labour | Ian Byrne | 2,295 | 86.6 | ▲5.3 |
| Conservative | David Murray | 136 | 5.1 | ▲1.4 |
| Green | Noèl Little | 100 | 3.8 | ▼4.2 |
| Liberal | Linda Roberts | 60 | 2.3 | ▼4.7 |
| Liberal Democrats | Nicolas Sawyer | 59 | 2.2 | New |
| Majority | | 2,159 | 81.5 | ▲8.2 |
| Registered electors | | 10,746 | | |
| Turnout | | 2,663 | 24.8 | ▼0.9 |
| Rejected ballots | | 13 | 0.5 | ▼0.5 |
| Labour hold | | Swing | ▲4.1 | |

=== Fazakerley ===
Fazakerley
| Party | Candidate | Votes | % | ±% |
|---|---|---|---|---|
| Labour | Lindsay Melia | 2,219 | 83.2 | ▲10.5 |
| Conservative | Giselle McDonald | 177 | 6.6 | ▲3.6 |
| Green | Luke Burke | 115 | 4.3 | ▼0.6 |
| Liberal Democrats | Joseph Slupsky | 108 | 4.0 | ▼6.3 |
| Liberal | Maureen Keyes | 49 | 1.8 | New |
| Majority | | 2,042 | 76.6 | ▲14.2 |
| Registered electors | | 11,252 | | |
| Turnout | | 2,677 | 23.8 | ▼2.7 |
| Rejected ballots | | 9 | 0.3 | ▼0.7 |
| Labour hold | | Swing | ▲7.1 | |

=== Greenbank ===
Greenbank
| Party | Candidate | Votes | % | ±% |
|---|---|---|---|---|
| Green | Lawrence Brown | 1,648 | 48.2 | ▲18.0 |
| Labour | Jon Morris | 1,553 | 45.5 | ▼11.9 |
| Liberal Democrats | Fiona McBride | 116 | 3.4 | ▼3.1 |
| Conservative | Nicholas Basson | 99 | 2.9 | ▼0.7 |
| Majority | | 95 | 2.7 | N/A |
| Registered electors | | 8,897 | | |
| Turnout | | 3,426 | 39.0 | ▼0.7 |
| Rejected ballots | | 10 | 0.3 | ▼0.9 |
| Green hold | | Swing | ▲15.0 | |

=== Kensington and Fairfield ===
Kensington and Fairfield
| Party | Candidate | Votes | % | ±% |
|---|---|---|---|---|
| Labour | Sue Walker | 1,768 | 76.1 | ▲5.1 |
| Green | Steve Faragher | 179 | 7.7 | ▲1.6 |
| Independent | Joe Owens | 114 | 4.9 | New |
| Liberal Democrats | Bill Barrow | 110 | 4.7 | ▼1.0 |
| Conservative | Brian Jones | 85 | 3.7 | ▲1.8 |
| Liberal | Damien Daly | 68 | 2.9 | ▼0.4 |
| Majority | | 1,589 | 68.4 | ▲8.0 |
| Registered electors | | 9,347 | | |
| Turnout | | 2,335 | 25.0 | ▼3.6 |
| Rejected ballots | | 11 | 0.5 | ▼0.4 |
| Labour hold | | Swing | ▲4.0 | |

Three days before the election, Green Candidate Steve Faragher resigned from the Green Party due to an online comment. This was too late for the ballot paper to be changed.

=== Kirkdale ===
Kirkdale
| Party | Candidate | Votes | % | ±% |
|---|---|---|---|---|
| Labour | Malcolm Kennedy | 2,094 | 82.1 | ▲2.7 |
| TUSC | Roger Bannister | 149 | 5.8 | ▼4.3 |
| Green | Jonathan Clatworthy | 104 | 4.1 | ▼2.5 |
| Conservative | Daniel Nuttall | 103 | 4.0 | ▲0.2 |
| Liberal Democrats | Mike McAllister-Bell | 76 | 3.0 | New |
| Liberal | Thomas Ryan | 23 | 0.9 | New |
| Majority | | 1,945 | 76.3 | ▲7.0 |
| Registered electors | | 11,370 | | |
| Turnout | | 2,557 | 22.5 | ▼2.7 |
| Rejected ballots | | 8 | 0.3 | ▼1.0 |
| Labour hold | | Swing | ▲3.5 | |

=== Knotty Ash ===
Knotty Ash - 2 seats
| Party | Candidate | Votes | % | ±% |
|---|---|---|---|---|
| Labour | Alison Clarke | 1,978 | 75.6 | ▲12.6 |
| Labour | Harry Doyle | 1,895 | 72.4 | ▲9.4 |
| Liberal Democrats | Graham Hughes | 329 | 12.6 | ▼1.7 |
| Conservative | Mark Butchard | 272 | 10.4 | ▲6.5 |
| Conservative | Irene Stuart | 235 | 9.0 | ▲5.1 |
| Liberal Democrats | Gerard Thompson | 182 | 7.0 | ▼7.3 |
| Green | Fiona Coyne | 154 | 5.9 | ▲1.9 |
| Green | Michael Humphrey Johnson | 116 | 4.4 | ▲0.4 |
| Liberal | Kenneth Russell | 79 | 3.0 | ▲0.5 |
| Majority | | 1,649 | 58.6 | ▲9.9 |
| Registered electors | | 10,599 | | |
| Turnout | | 2,624 | 24.9 | ▼5.2 |
| Rejected ballots | | 8 | 0.2 | ▼1.1 |
| Labour hold | | Swing | ▲5.0 | |
| Labour hold | | Swing | – | |

After voting against the Labour Council Group Budget, Cllr. Alison Clarke resigned the Labour Whip on 22 April 2022 and joined the Community Independent Group.

Alison Clark resigned as a councillor on 10 November 2022.

=== Mossley Hill ===
Mossley Hill
| Party | Candidate | Votes | % | ±% |
|---|---|---|---|---|
| Labour | Elizabeth Hayden | 1,904 | 45.6 | ▲3.0 |
| Liberal Democrats | Alisha Lewis | 1,462 | 35.0 | ▲5.1 |
| Green | Ted Grant | 440 | 10.5 | ▼9.2 |
| Conservative | Chris Hall | 260 | 6.2 | ▲0.3 |
| Liberal | David Wood | 106 | 2.5 | ▲0.6 |
| Majority | | 442 | 10.6 | ▼2.1 |
| Registered electors | | 9,410 | | |
| Turnout | | 4,172 | 44.4 | ▼0.8 |
| Rejected ballots | | 7 | 0.2 | ▼0.9 |
| Labour hold | | Swing | ▼1.1 | |

=== Norris Green ===
Norris Green
| Party | Candidate | Votes | % | ±% |
|---|---|---|---|---|
| Labour | Barry Kushner | 2,344 | 85.8 | ▲17.5 |
| Green | Martyn Madeley | 142 | 5.2 | ▼3.7 |
| Conservative | Alma McGing | 132 | 4.8 | ▲1.6 |
| Liberal Democrats | Sam Buist | 62 | 2.3 | New |
| Liberal | Brenda Jean Edwards | 51 | 1.9 | New |
| Majority | | 2,202 | 80.6 | ▲24.1 |
| Registered electors | | 12,116 | | |
| Turnout | | 2,746 | 22.7 | ▲2.8 |
| Rejected ballots | | 15 | 0.5 | ▲0.2 |
| Labour hold | | Swing | ▲12.1 | |

=== Old Swan ===
Old Swan
| Party | Candidate | Votes | % | ±% |
|---|---|---|---|---|
| Labour | Joanne Calvert | 2,174 | 75.0 | ▲6.3 |
| Liberal Democrats | Chris Collins | 162 | 5.6 | ▼2.9 |
| Old Swan Against the Cuts | Martin Ralph | 157 | 5.4 | ▼6.6 |
| Conservative | Derek Nuttall | 144 | 5.0 | ▲1.7 |
| Green | George Maxwell | 136 | 4.7 | ▼0.2 |
| Liberal | Irene Morrison | 126 | 4.3 | ▲1.7 |
| Majority | | 2,012 | 69.4 | ▲12.7 |
| Registered electors | | 11,220 | | |
| Turnout | | 2,910 | 25.9 | ▼5.0 |
| Rejected ballots | | 11 | 0.4 | ▼1.6 |
| Labour hold | | Swing | | |

=== Picton ===
Picton
| Party | Candidate | Votes | % | ±% |
|---|---|---|---|---|
| Labour | Paul Kenyon | 1,931 | 83.6 | ▲10.6 |
| Green | Paul Woodruff | 139 | 6.0 | ▼4.1 |
| Liberal Democrats | Alex Cottrell | 88 | 3.8 | ▼4.3 |
| Conservative | Johnathan Andrew | 76 | 3.3 | ▼0.4 |
| Independent | Adam Heatherington | 55 | 2.4 | New |
| Liberal | Colin Edwards | 21 | 0.9 | New |
| Majority | | 1,792 | 77.6 | ▲14.7 |
| Registered electors | | 10,002 | | |
| Turnout | | 2,322 | 23.2 | ▼4.3 |
| Rejected ballots | | 12 | 0.5 | ▼1.1 |
| Labour hold | | Swing | ▲7.4 | |

=== Prince's Park ===
Prince's Park
| Party | Candidate | Votes | % | ±% |
|---|---|---|---|---|
| Labour | Anna Rothery | 2,155 | 78.8 | ▲11.2 |
| Green | Stephanie Pitchers | 347 | 12.7 | ▼6.6 |
| Liberal Democrats | Tom Sebire | 122 | 4.5 | ▼0.5 |
| Conservative | Beryl Pinnington | 111 | 4.1 | ▲0.7 |
| Majority | | 1,808 | 66.1 | ▲17.8 |
| Registered electors | | 10,715 | | |
| Turnout | | 2,753 | 25.7 | ▼4.5 |
| Rejected ballots | | 18 | 0.7 | ▼1.0 |
| Labour hold | | Swing | ▲8.9 | |

=== Riverside ===
Riverside
| Party | Candidate | Votes | % | ±% |
|---|---|---|---|---|
| Labour | Hetty Wood | 2,601 | 79.5 | ▲2.9 |
| Green | Rebecca Lawson | 297 | 9.1 | ▼1.6 |
| Conservative | Robin Singleton | 194 | 5.9 | ▲2.3 |
| Liberal Democrats | Anna McCracken | 181 | 5.5 | ▼0.4 |
| Majority | | 2,304 | 70.4 | ▲4.5 |
| Registered electors | | 14,170 | | |
| Turnout | | 3,286 | 23.2 | ▼4.2 |
| Rejected ballots | | 13 | 0.4 | ▼0.8 |
| Labour hold | | Swing | ▲2.3 | |

=== St. Michael's ===
St. Michael's
| Party | Candidate | Votes | % | ±% |
|---|---|---|---|---|
| Green | Tom Crone | 2,205 | 58.3 | ▼3.7 |
| Labour | Stuart Fordham | 1,395 | 36.9 | ▲7.9 |
| Conservative | David Patmore | 99 | 2.6 | ▲0.5 |
| Liberal Democrats | Norman Darbyshire | 82 | 2.2 | ▼1.7 |
| Majority | | 810 | 21.4 | ▼11.6 |
| Registered electors | | 9,810 | | |
| Turnout | | 3,789 | 38.6 | ▲0.7 |
| Rejected ballots | | 8 | 0.2 | ▼0.7 |
| Green hold | | Swing | ▼5.8 | |

=== Speke-Garston ===
Speke-Garston
| Party | Candidate | Votes | % | ±% |
|---|---|---|---|---|
| Labour | Doreen Knight | 2,634 | 82.8 | ▲3.9 |
| Green | Rachael Stretton | 184 | 5.8 | ▼2.7 |
| Liberal Democrats | Alan Tormey | 184 | 5.8 | ▼2.1 |
| Conservative | James Craig | 178 | 5.6 | ▲0.9 |
| Majority | | 2,450 | 77.0 | ▲6.6 |
| Registered electors | | 13,792 | | |
| Turnout | | 3,189 | 23.1 | ▼2.9 |
| Rejected ballots | | 9 | 0.3 | ▼0.9 |
| Labour hold | | Swing | ▲3.3 | |

=== Tuebrook & Stoneycroft ===
Tuebrook and Stoneycroft
| Party | Candidate | Votes | % | ±% |
|---|---|---|---|---|
| Liberal | William Lake | 2,524 | 64.0 | ▼14.3 |
| Labour | Don Porter | 1,283 | 32.6 | ▲16.1 |
| Liberal Democrats | Pat Moloney | 50 | 1.3 | ▼0.2 |
| Green | Martin Dobson | 47 | 1.2 | ▼0.3 |
| Conservative | Elliot Craddock | 37 | 0.9 | ▲0.5 |
| Majority | | 1,241 | 31.4 | ▼30.4 |
| Registered electors | | 10,390 | | |
| Turnout | | 3,948 | 38.0 | ▲1.4 |
| Rejected ballots | | 7 | 0.2 | ▼0.1 |
| Liberal hold | | Swing | ▼15.2 | |

=== Warbreck ===
Warbreck
| Party | Candidate | Votes | % | ±% |
|---|---|---|---|---|
| Labour | Cheryl Didsbury | 2,321 | 80.0 | ▲9.7 |
| Liberal Democrats | Jerry Lonsdale | 228 | 7.9 | ▼6.2 |
| Conservative | McLean Wickham | 190 | 6.5 | ▲3.9 |
| Green | Jean Hill | 126 | 4.3 | ▼2.1 |
| Liberal | George Roberts | 38 | 1.3 | ▼1.1 |
| Majority | | 2,093 | 72.1 | ▲15.9 |
| Registered electors | | 11,122 | | |
| Turnout | | 2,916 | 26.2 | ▼2.1 |
| Rejected ballots | | 13 | 0.4 | ▼0.6 |
| Labour hold | | Swing | ▲8.0 | |

=== Wavertree ===
Wavertree
| Party | Candidate | Votes | % | ±% |
|---|---|---|---|---|
| Labour | Angela Coleman | 2,122 | 62.5 | ▲8.9 |
| Liberal Democrats | Graham Hulme | 653 | 19.2 | Steady |
| Green | David Morgan | 303 | 8.9 | ▼2.6 |
| Conservative | Stuart Wood | 247 | 7.3 | ▲2.7 |
| Liberal | Jonathan Mason | 72 | 2.1 | ▼5.5 |
| Majority | | 1,469 | 43.3 | ▲8.9 |
| Registered electors | | 10,510 | | |
| Turnout | | 3,409 | 32.4 | ▼3.1 |
| Rejected ballots | | 12 | 0.4 | ▼0.9 |
| Labour hold | | Swing | ▲4.5 | |

=== West Derby ===
West Derby
| Party | Candidate | Votes | % | ±% |
|---|---|---|---|---|
| Labour | Pam Thomas | 2,243 | 69.9 | ▲10.8 |
| Conservative | Pauline Shuttleworth | 278 | 8.7 | ▲4.9 |
| Liberal | Ann Hines | 274 | 8.5 | ▼5.2 |
| Liberal Democrats | Paul Parr | 260 | 8.1 | ▼1.7 |
| Green | Ellie Pontin | 107 | 3.3 | ▼0.6 |
| TUSC | Ann Barbara Walsh | 48 | 1.5 | New |
| Majority | | 1,965 | 61.2 | ▲15.8 |
| Registered electors | | 10,958 | | |
| Turnout | | 3,216 | 29.3 | ▼2.0 |
| Rejected ballots | | 6 | 0.2 | ▼0.7 |
| Labour hold | | Swing | ▲7.9 | |

=== Woolton ===
Woolton
| Party | Candidate | Votes | % | ±% |
|---|---|---|---|---|
| Liberal Democrats | Kris Brown | 2,148 | 50.5 | ▲3.9 |
| Labour | Colin McAlley | 1,394 | 32.8 | ▲3.4 |
| Conservative | Adam Marsden | 488 | 11.5 | ▲1.9 |
| Green | Jennifer Brown | 226 | 5.3 | ▲1.4 |
| Majority | | 754 | 17.7 | ▲0.5 |
| Registered electors | | 10,636 | | |
| Turnout | | 4,264 | 40.1 | ▼6.2 |
| Rejected ballots | | 8 | 0.2 | ▼0.9 |
| Liberal Democrats gain from Labour | | Swing | ▲0.3 | |

=== Yew Tree ===
Yew Tree
| Party | Candidate | Votes | % | ±% |
|---|---|---|---|---|
| Labour | Tony Conception | 2,414 | 81.3 | ▲7.8 |
| Conservative | Gillian Ferrigno | 244 | 8.2 | ▲1.7 |
| Liberal Democrats | Jacqueline Wilson | 117 | 3.9 | ▼1.5 |
| Liberal | Sam Hawksford | 100 | 3.4 | ▼0.9 |
| Green | William Ward | 93 | 3.1 | ▼1.6 |
| Majority | | 2,170 | 73.1 | ▲6.1 |
| Registered electors | | 11,816 | | |
| Turnout | | 2,975 | 25.2 | ▼1.5 |
| Rejected ballots | | 7 | 0.2 | ▼1.3 |
| Labour hold | | Swing | ▲3.1 | |

== See also ==
- Liverpool City Council
- Liverpool Town Council elections 1835 - 1879
- Liverpool City Council elections 1880–present
- Mayors and Lord Mayors of Liverpool 1207 to present
- History of local government in England
- Elections in the United Kingdom

== Notes ==
• italics denote a sitting councillor • bold denotes the winning candidate
