= Tom Crone (politician) =

Green Party leader on Liverpool City Council

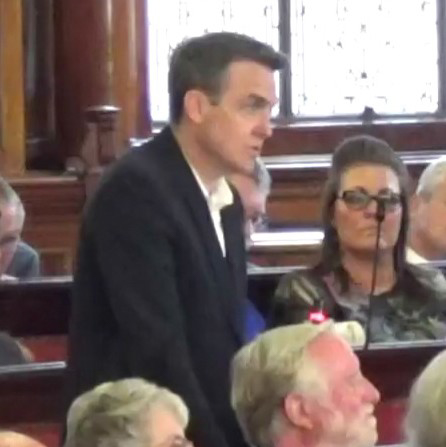

Green Group Leader on Liverpool City Council
- Incumbent
- Assumed office 1 April 2015
- Preceded by: John Coyne

Liverpool City Councillor for St Michael's
- Incumbent
- Assumed office 22 May 2014
- Preceded by: Sharon Green (Independent)

Personal details
- Born: Thomas Martin Crone; 1980 (age 45–46)
- Party: Green Party
- Education: Liverpool John Moores University

Tom Crone (born 1980) is a British Green Party politician and leader of the Green Party group on Liverpool City Council. Since 2014, Crone has served as a councillor for St Michael's. In 2010 and 2019 he was a House of Commons candidate for Liverpool Riverside. In 2024 he was a candidate for Liverpool Wavertree. In 2016 and 2021, he was the Green Party candidate for Mayor of Liverpool and in 2017 and 2024, he was their candidate for Mayor of the Liverpool City Region.

== Early life, family and education ==
Crone is originally from Norfolk. In 2000 he moved to Liverpool to study environmental science and policy at Liverpool John Moores University. He eventually settled in St Michael's Hamlet. He works as a self-employed energy assessor, advising householders on energy efficiency. He is a father of two children and his wife is a frontline NHS worker.

== Political career ==
=== Councillor ===
Since 2014, Crone has served as a councillor for St Michael's, representing the Green Party. He won his seat with 60% of the vote. He first stood in St Michaels in 2010. However, on that occasion he was unsuccessful. In 2015, Crone succeeded John Coyne as the leader of the Green Party group in Liverpool City Council. He was subsequently re-elected as a councillor in 2018. Between 2014 and 2023, Crone was one of three councillors to represent St Michael's. Others included Anna Key and Sarah Jennings. However, ahead of the 2023 elections, the Liverpool City Council ward boundaries were re-drawn and St Michael's went from a three seat ward to a single seat ward. Crone was subsequently re-elected as a councillor for the new smaller St Michael's ward. In 2024 he celebrated ten years as a councillor.

=== Parliamentary candidate ===
In 2010, Crone was the Green Party House of Commons candidate for Liverpool Riverside. Ahead of the vote he called for a "clean" campaign. In 2019, Crone stood again in Liverpool Riverside. In 2024, he stood in Liverpool Wavertree, finishing second to the Labour Party's Paula Barker.

=== City mayor candidate ===
In 2016, Crone was the Green Party Mayor of Liverpool candidate. In July 2015, Natalie Bennett, the Leader of the Green Party of England and Wales, visited Liverpool to officially launch his campaign. He gained 10,609 votes (10.9%). In 2021, Crone was again the Green Party Mayor of Liverpool candidate. He called for the Mayor of Liverpool role to be scrapped, as it "puts too much power in the hands of one person".

=== Regional mayor candidate ===
In 2017, Crone was the Green Party candidate for the Mayor of the Liverpool City Region. In 2024, he was the Green Party candidate for a second time.

== Political views ==
Crone heavily advocates for public investment in home insulation to simultaneously combat fuel poverty and reduce carbon emissions. He has been involved with successful campaigns to protect parks and green spaces from development, and continues to pressure Liverpool City Council to secure local parks under the Fields in Trust project, protecting green spaces permanently from private developers. He supports the introduction of universal basic income.

Crone has called for Merseyrail to be bought back into public ownership. He believes in a joined-up public transport network, prioritising bus transit, pedestrian spaces, and fully segregated cycling lanes. Crone promotes "people-powered democracy," advocating for citizens' assemblies to tackle structural governance and environmental crises.
