= 2014 Liverpool City Council election =

- 22 May 2014

30 of 90 seats (One Third to Liverpool City Council 46 seats needed for a majority
- Turnout: 31% (▼48%)
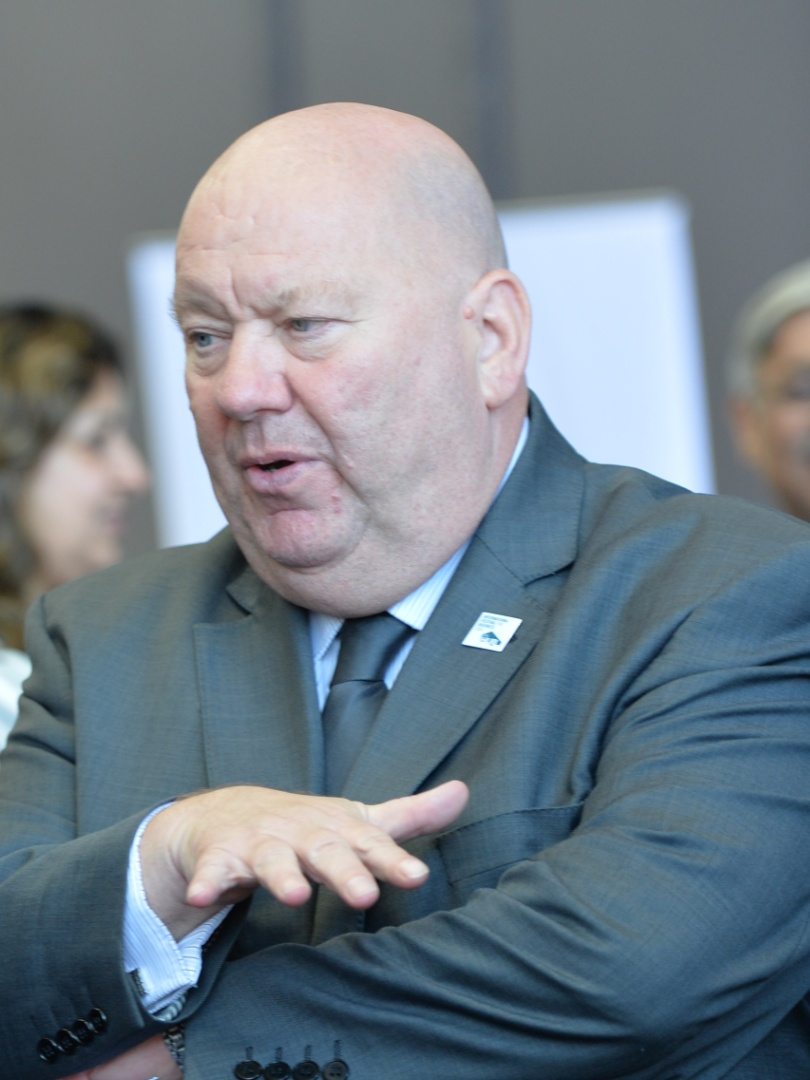

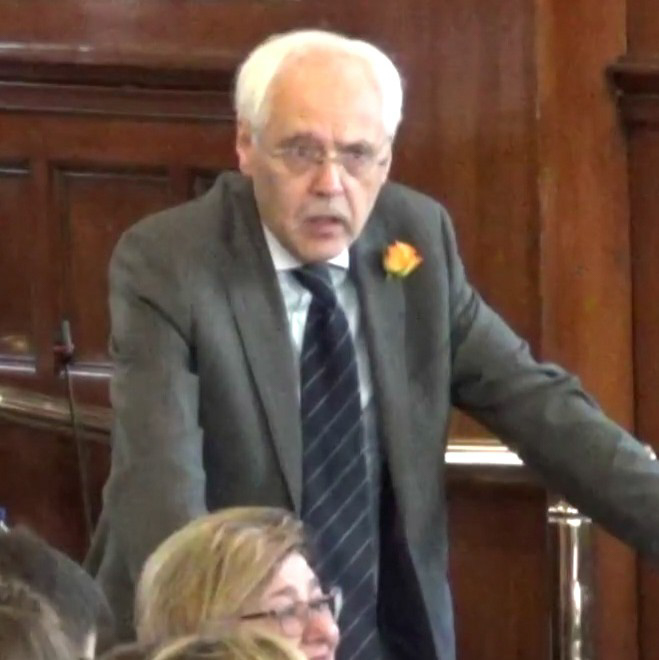

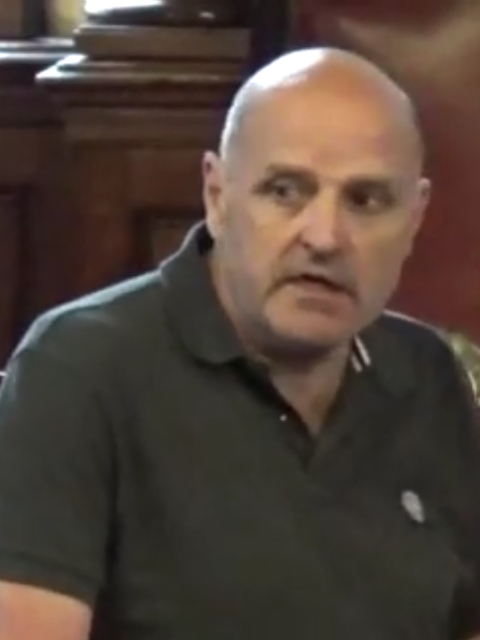
	First party	Second party	Third party
Leader	Joe Anderson	John Coyne	Richard Kemp
Party	Labour	Green	Liberal Democrats
Leader's seat	N/A, Mayor	St Michael's	Church
Last election	78 seats, 67%	1 seat, 9.7%	1 seat, 16.7%
Seats before	73	2	9
Seats won	27	2	0
Seats after	78	4	3
Seat change	▲5	▲2	▼6
Popular vote	57,354	10,581	9,325
Percentage	58%	10.7%	9.45%
Swing	▼7%	▲3.4%	▼3.5%
	Fourth party
Leader	Steve Radford
Party	Liberal
Leader's seat	Tuebrook and Stoneycroft
Last election	0 seats, 3.1%
Seats before	3
Seats won	1
Seats after	3
Seat change	Steady
Popular vote	4,450
Percentage	4.5%
Swing	▼0.5%
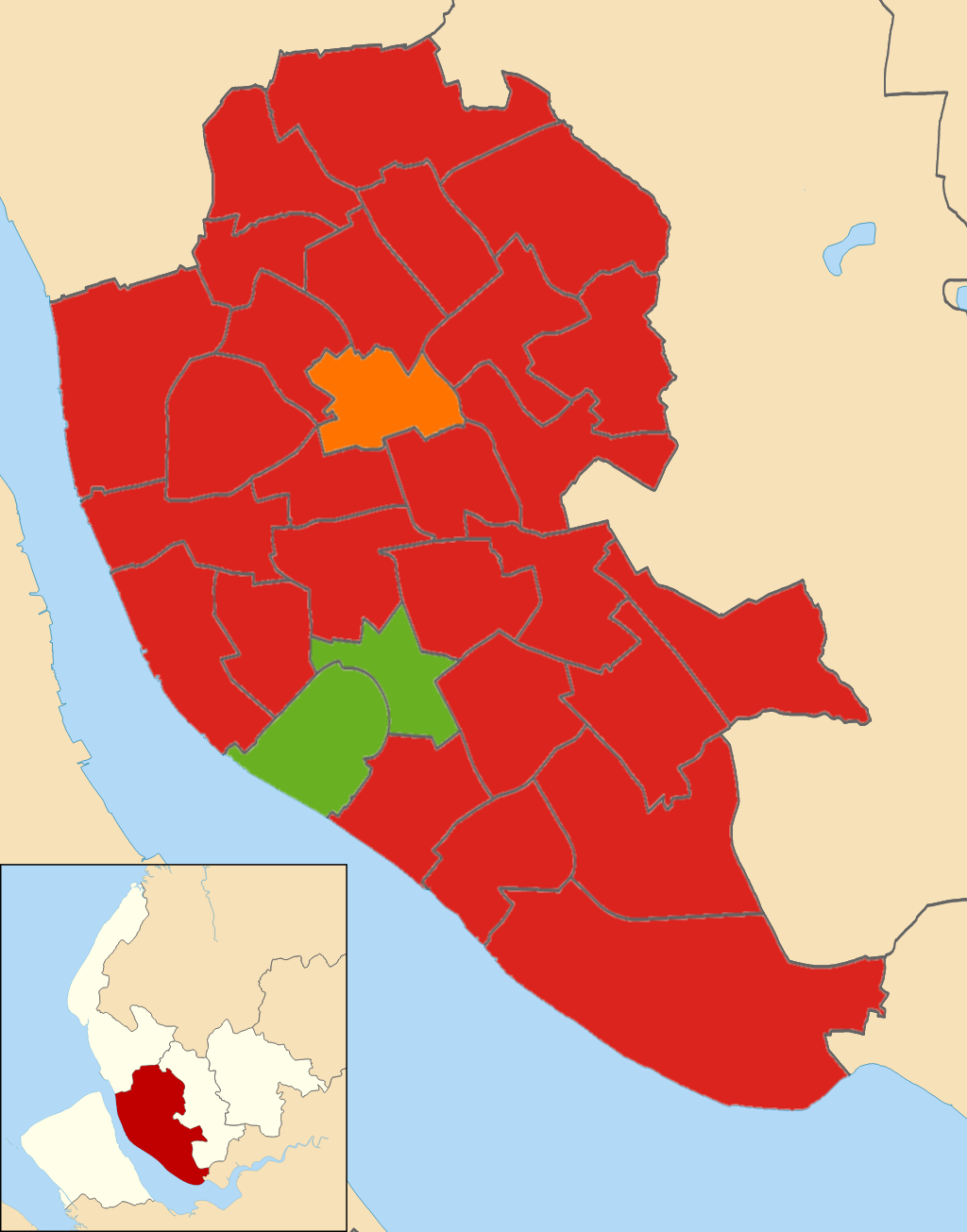
- Map of results of 2014 election
Control of Council before election
Joe Anderson
Labour
Control of Council after Election
Joe Anderson
Labour

Elections to Liverpool City Council were held on 22 May 2014. The election date was delayed from the usual first Thursday in May to coincide with the European Parliament election. Due to the 'in thirds' system of election, one third of the council were up for election, with direct comparisons to previous results made with the corresponding vote at the 2010 Liverpool City Council election. After the election, the composition of the council was:

Party	Seats	±
Labour	78	+5
Green	4	+2
Liberal Democrats	3	-6
Liberal	3	0
Independent	2	-1

== Election result ==
Liverpool local election result 2014
Party	Seats	Gains	Losses	Net gain/loss	Seats %	Votes %	Votes	+/−
Labour	27	5	0	+5	90%	58.09%	57,354	▼4.45%
Green	2	2	0	+2	4.44%	10.72%	10,581	+
Liberal	1	0	0	0	3.33%	4.51%	4,450	+0.88%
UKIP	0	0	0	0	0%	9.74%	9,612	+8.27%
Liberal Democrats	0	0	6	-6	0%	9.45%	9,325	-3.69%
Conservative	0	0	0	0	0%	5.14%	5,070	+0.57%
TUSC	0	0	0	0	0%	1.22%	1,201	
Independent	0	0	0	0	0%	0.60%	595	
NHA	0	0	0	0	0%	0.36%	360	
English Democrat	0	0	0	0	0%	0.18%	178	

== Ward results ==
* - Existing Councillor seeking re-election.

^{(PARTY)} - Party of former Councillor

=== Allerton and Hunts Cross ===
Allerton and Hunts Cross
Party	Candidate	Votes	%	±%
Labour	Rachael O'Byrne	1,991	51.12%	▲13%
Liberal Democrats	Mirna Juarez ^{(PARTY)}	990	25.42%	▼19%
Conservative	Christopher Halligan	427	10.96%	▼3%
Green	Maggi Williams	403	10.35%	▲7%
Liberal	Irene Morrison	84	2.16%	
Majority		1,001		
Registered electors		11,285		
Turnout		3,895	34.51	▼30%
Rejected ballots		26		
Labour gain from Liberal Democrats		Swing		

=== Anfield ===
Anfield
Party	Candidate	Votes	%	±%
Labour	Ian Francis *	1,850	74.51%	▲20%
NHA	Louise Boothroyd	245	9.87%	
Liberal	James Richardson	146	5.88%	▼0.5%
Green	Jean Hartrick Hill	145	5.84%	▲4%
Conservative	Thomas Roberts	97	3.91%	▼0.3%
Majority		1,605		
Registered electors		9,229		
Turnout		2,483	26.90%	▼27%
Rejected ballots		25		
Labour hold		Swing		

=== Belle Vale ===
Belle Vale
Party	Candidate	Votes	%	±%
Labour	Pauline Walton *	2,307	67.16%	▼2%
UKIP	Karl Sullivan	611	17.79%	
TUSC	Roy Dixon	176	5.12%	
Green	Julie Birch-Holt	141	4.10%	▲2%
Conservative	Maria Prayle	125	3.64%	▼1%
Liberal	Damien Patrick Daly	75	2.18%	▼29%
Majority		1,696		
Registered electors		13,905		
Turnout		3,435	30.57%	▼28%
Rejected ballots		21		
Labour hold		Swing		

=== Central ===
Central
Party	Candidate	Votes	%	±%
Labour	Nick Small *	1,208	63.11%	▲10%
Green	Hannah Ellen Clare	365	19.07%	▲13%
Conservative	Lee Berry	151	7.89%	▼2%
UKIP	Tony Power	149	7.78%	
Liberal	Michele Leigh Williams	41	2.14%	0%
Majority		843		
Registered electors		11,093		
Turnout		1,914	13.76%	▼19%
Rejected ballots		13		
Labour hold		Swing		

=== Childwall ===
Childwall
Party	Candidate	Votes	%	±%
Labour	Frank Hont	1,755	45.10%	▲6%
Liberal Democrats	Pat Moloney *	1,033	26.55%	▼15%
UKIP	Adam Heatherington	593	15.24%	
Green	Rebecca Lawson	215	5.53%	▲2%
Conservative	Elizabeth Pearson	209	5.37%	▲3.5%
Liberal	Jonathan Mason	86	2.21%	▼5%
Majority		722		
Registered electors		10,796		
Turnout		3,891	35.08%	▲32%
Rejected ballots		16		
Labour gain from Liberal Democrats		Swing		

=== Church ===
Church
Party	Candidate	Votes	%	±%
Labour	Dr Richard Wenstone	1,906	40.48%	▲9%
Liberal Democrats	Andrew Makinson *	1,805	38.44%	▼7%
Conservative	James Pearson	286	6.07%	▲4%
Green	Eleanor Martin	522	11.09%	▲5%
Liberal	John Bradley	190	4.03%	▼4%
Majority		101		
Registered electors		10,796		
Turnout		4,608	42.68%	▼23%
Rejected ballots		26		
Labour gain from Liberal Democrats		Swing		

=== Clubmoor ===
Clubmoor
Party	Candidate	Votes	%	±%
Labour	Roz Gladden *	2,201	68.59%	▼5%
UKIP	Paul Forrest	686	21.38%	
Green	Elspeth Anwar	117	3.65%	▲1%
Liberal	Paul Wynne Jones	130	4.05%	▼14%
Conservative	Beryl Pinnington	75	2.34%	▼2%
Majority		1,515		
Registered electors		11,162		
Turnout		3,209	28.75%	▼24%
Rejected ballots		12		
Labour hold		Swing		

=== County ===
County
Party	Candidate	Votes	%	±%
Labour	Gerard Woodhouse *	2,148	77.02%	▲14%
UKIP	Neil Kenny	406	14.56%	
Green	Tony Jones	92	3.3%	▼2%
Conservative	Brian Jones	48	1.72%	▼1.5%
Liberal	Stephen Houghland	95	3.41%	
Majority		1,742		
Registered electors		9,625		
Turnout		2,789	28.98%	▼13%
Rejected ballots		9		
Labour hold		Swing		

=== Cressington ===
Cressington
Party	Candidate	Votes	%	±%
Labour	Linnie Hinnigan	2,039	47.06%	▲10%
Liberal Democrats	Dominic McCaffrey ^{(PARTY)}	882	20.36%	▼24%
UKIP	Austin Lucas	540	12.46%	
Green	Martin Randall	406	9.37%	▲5%
Conservative	Jade Marsden	321	7.41%	▲6%
Liberal	Maureen Keyes	145	3.35%	▲2.6%
Majority		1,157		
Registered electors		11,645		
Turnout		4,333	37.21%	▼25%
Rejected ballots		14		
Labour gain from Liberal Democrats		Swing		

=== Croxteth ===
Croxteth
Party	Candidate	Votes	%	±%
Labour	Peter Mitchell *	1,887	66.33%	▲7%
UKIP	Mark Leavesley	625	21.97%	
Green	Don Ross	127	4.46%	▲3%
Conservative	Giselle Henrietta McDonald	112	3.94%	▲1%
Liberal	John McBride	94	3.3%	0%
Majority		1,262		
Registered electors		10,489		
Turnout		2,845	27.12%	▼27%
Rejected ballots		15		
Labour hold		Swing		

=== Everton ===
Everton
Party	Candidate	Votes	%	±%
Labour	John McIntosh *	2,056	69.48%	▼10%
Conservative	Jack Stallworthy	66	2.23%	▼9.4%
TUSC	Roger Edwards	89	3.01%	
Green	Esther Coslett	125	4.22%	▲1.3%
UKIP	John Halvorsen	557	18.82%	
Liberal	Linda Roberts	66	2.23%	▲9.5%
Majority		1,499		
Registered electors		10,198		
Turnout		2,959	29.02%	▼20%
Rejected ballots		17		
Labour hold		Swing		

=== Fazakerley ===
Fazakerley
Party	Candidate	Votes	%	±%
Labour	Dave Hanratty *	2,163	69.80%	▲2%
UKIP	Enid Lindsay	539	17.39%	
Liberal Democrats	Graham Seddon	156	5.03%	▼17%
Green	Jennifer Brown	133	4.29%	▲3%
Conservative	Lucy Glover	85	2.74%	▼2.5%
Liberal	Charles Mayes	23	0.74%	▼2.25%
Majority		1,624		
Registered electors		11,110		
Turnout		3,099	27.89%	▼30%
Rejected ballots		16		
Labour hold		Swing		

=== Greenbank ===
Greenbank
Party	Candidate	Votes	%	±%
Green	Lawrence Brown	1,706	48.18%	▲29.05%
Labour	Graeme Cooper	1,339	37.81%	▼22.08%
UKIP	Joseph Stanley Chiffers	191	5.39%	
Conservative	Nicholas Basson	144	4.07%	▼5%
Liberal Democrats	Jeanete Makinson ^{(PARTY)}	103	2.91%	▼39%
TUSC	Simon Adam Worthington	47	1.33%	
Liberal	Irene Nora Mayes	11	0.31%	▼1.7%
Majority		367		
Registered electors		10,360		
Turnout		3,541	34.18%	▼22%
Rejected ballots		13		
Green gain from Liberal Democrats		Swing		

=== Kensington and Fairfield ===
Kensington and Fairfield
Party	Candidate	Votes	%	±%
Labour	Sue Heron ^{(PARTY)}	1,834	67.85%	▲5%
UKIP	Mike Lane	484	17.91%	
Independent	Steve Faragher	151	5.59%	
Liberal Democrats	Bill Barrow	102	3.77%	▼25%
Conservative	Ben Hachula	51	1.89%	▼1%
TUSC	Dave Jones	41	1.52%	
Liberal	Brenda Edwards	40	1.48%	▼0.8%
Majority		1,350		
Registered electors		8,942		
Turnout		2,703	30.23%	▼23%
Rejected ballots		16		
Labour hold		Swing		

=== Kirkdale ===
Kirkdale
Party	Candidate	Votes	%	±%
Labour	Robert Malcolm Kennedy *	2,303	78.71%	▼7%
TUSC	Roger Bannister	206	7.04%	
Green	Jonathan Clatworthy	177	6.05%	▲3.3%
Liberal	Tommy Stalker	140	4.78%	▼2%
Conservative	David Michael John Jeffery	100	3.42%	▼1.5%
Majority		2,097		
Registered electors		11,767		
Turnout		2,926	24.87%	▼23%
Rejected ballots		28		
Labour hold		Swing		

=== Knotty Ash ===
Knotty Ash
Party	Candidate	Votes	%	±%
Labour	Ged Taylor ^{(PARTY)}	1,964	61.55%	▲10%
UKIP	John David Sisson	578	18.11%	
Liberal Democrats	Norman Mills	251	7.87%	▼31%
Conservative	Emilio Chiquito	149	4.67%	▲1.25%
Green	Jade Emma Kuhlke	148	4.64%	▲2.5%
English Democrat	Derek Francis Grue	57	1.79%	
Liberal	Marjorie Peel	44	1.38%	▼2.8%
Majority		1,386		
Registered electors		10,107		
Turnout		3,191	31.57%	▼28%
Rejected ballots		19		
Labour hold		Swing		

=== Mossley Hill ===
Mossley Hill
Party	Candidate	Votes	%	±%
Labour	Andrew Douglas Foxley	1,652	42.08%	+8%
Liberal Democrats	Paul Childs ^{(PARTY)}	1,111	28.30%	−19%
Conservative	Chris Hall	381	9.70%	−3%
Green	Helen Randall	717	18.26%	+12%
Liberal	David Wood	65	1.66%	
Majority		541		
Turnout		3,926	38.11%	
Rejected ballots		34		
Labour gain from Liberal Democrats		Swing		

=== Norris Green ===
Norris Green
Party	Candidate	Votes	%	±%
Labour	Debbie Caine ^{(PARTY)}	2,016	68.20%	−12%
UKIP	Joe Gallagher	595	20.13%	
TUSC	Mary Ann Wheeler	122	4.13%	
Green	Fee Coyne	91	3.08%	+1%
Conservative	Gillian Ferrigno	73	2.47%	−4%
Liberal	Diane Burns	59	2.00%	−9%
Majority		1,421		
Turnout		2,956	27.69%	−3%
Rejected ballots		29		
Labour hold		Swing		

=== Old Swan ===
Old Swan
Party	Candidate	Votes	%	±%
Labour	Joanne Calvert *	2,105	60.65%	+5%
UKIP	Tony Hammond	549	15.82%	
Old Swan Against the Cuts	Ralph Martin	296	8.53%	
Green	Vikki Ann Gregorich	150	4.32%	−1%
Liberal	Sheila Ann Fairclough	139	4.00%	+2.4%
Conservative	George Powell	107	3.08%	+0.52%
Liberal Democrats	Jacqueline Elaine Wilson	104	3.00%	−33%
English Democrat	Steven Greenhalgh	21	0.61%	
Majority		1,556		
Turnout		3,471	31.10%	+2%
Rejected ballots		17		
Labour hold		Swing		

=== Picton ===
Picton
Party	Candidate	Votes	%	±%
Labour	Tim Beaumont *	1,794	65.86%	+11%
UKIP	David Halvorsen	307	11.27%	
Green	Ross James Campbell	305	11.20%	+7%
Liberal Democrats	Kevin White	134	4.92%	−28%
Conservative	Alma Gavine McGing	83	3.05%	−1%
TUSC	Frank Bowen	61	2.24%	
Liberal	Susan O'Brien	40	1.47%	−3%
Majority		1,487		
Turnout		2,724	26.58%	+2%
Rejected ballots		13		
Labour hold		Swing		

=== Prince's Park ===
Prince's Park
Party	Candidate	Votes	%	±%
Labour	Anna Rothery	1,890	67.09%	+14%
Green	Simeon Daniel Hart	459	16.29%	+4%
Independent	Frank Jones	148	5.25%	
TUSC	Daren Andrew Ireland	142	5.04%	
Conservative	Laura Watson	113	4.01%	−1.8%
Liberal	Lindsey Janet Mary Wood	65	2.31%	−0.9%
Majority		1,431		
Turnout		2,817	30.38%	−3.18%
Rejected ballots		24		
Labour hold		Swing		

=== Riverside ===
Riverside
Party	Candidate	Votes	%	±%
Labour	Hetty Wood ^{(PARTY)}	2,078	67.31%	−0.19%
UKIP	Darren McCready	413	13.38%	
Green	Martin Dobson	276	8.94%	+4.14%
Conservative	John Watson	117	3.79%	−3.3%
Liberal Democrats	Sean McHugh	104	3.37%	−14%
TUSC	John Marston	81	2.62%	
Liberal	Ian Bull	18	0.58%	+2.5%
Majority		1,665		
Turnout		3,087	26.04%	−2.7%
Rejected ballots		11		
Labour hold		Swing		

=== St. Michael's ===
St. Michael's
Party	Candidate	Votes	%	±%
Green	Tom Crone	2,130	60.10%	+30%
Labour	Patricia Margaret Elizabeth O'Brien	1,078	30.42%	+1%
Conservative	David Patmore	112	3.16%	−3.5%
Liberal Democrats	Anna Martin	80	2.26%	−32%
TUSC	Giorgo Moulas	69	1.95%	
English Democrat	Paul Duane Rimmer	60	1.69%	
Liberal	Jessica Bull	15	0.42%	
Majority		1,052		
Turnout		3.544	37.09%	−4.4%
Rejected ballots		13		
Green gain from Independent		Swing		

=== Speke-Garston ===
Speke-Garston
Party	Candidate	Votes	%	±%
Labour	Doreen Knight *	2,717	80.12%	−0.5%
Green	Pam Robinson	292	8.61%	+5%
Conservative	Lewis Wooding-Smith	165	4.87%	−1.55%
Liberal Democrats	Kris Brown	161	4.75%	−2.45%
Liberal	Colin Edwards	56	1.65%	−1.85%
Majority		2,425		
Turnout		3,391	25.93%	+5.5%
Rejected ballots		38		
Labour hold		Swing		

=== Tuebrook & Stoneycroft ===
Tuebrook and Stoneycroft
Party	Candidate	Votes	%	±%
Liberal	Kevin John Morrison ^{(PARTY)}	1,874	60.04	+0.7%
Labour	Aver Gbaa	911	29.19%	−5.1%
Green	Natalie Clark	164	5.25%	+2%
TUSC	Craig Thomas Pearson	99	3.17%	
Conservative	Peter Connick	73	2.34%	−0.86%
Majority		963		
Turnout		3,121	30.41%	
Rejected ballots		16		
Liberal hold		Swing		

=== Warbreck ===
Warbreck
Party	Candidate	Votes	%	±%
Labour	Cheryl Harrison ^{(PARTY)}	2,138	64.71%	+6%
UKIP	Connor Forrest	577	17.46%	
Liberal Democrats	Richard Roberts	292	8.84%	−26%
Green	Ellie Pontin	136	4.12%	+1.6%
Conservative	Jack Stanley	84	2.54%	+1.36%
English Democrat	Steven McEllenborough	40	1.21%	
Liberal	George Blacklock Roberts	37	1.12%	
Majority		1,561		
Turnout		3,304	29.42%	−27.4%
Rejected ballots		26		
Labour hold		Swing		

=== Wavertree ===
Wavertree
Party	Candidate	Votes	%	±%
Labour	Rosie Jolly *	1,859	53.36%	+16.46
Liberal Democrats	Stephen Maddison	435	12.49%	−34.4%
Conservative	Diane Watson	155	4.45%	−0.65%
Green	Elizabeth Pascoe	351	10.07%	+4.77%
UKIP	Neil Miney	438	12.57%	
NHA	Stephen McNally	115	3.30%	
Liberal	James Robert Dykstra	131	3.76%	−2%
Majority		1,421		
Turnout		3,484	33.98%	−29.62%
Rejected ballots		15		
Labour hold		Swing		

=== West Derby ===
West Derby
Party	Candidate	Votes	%	±%
Labour	Pam Thomas *	1,993	55.58%	+7.7%
UKIP	Stuart Monkcom	774	21.58%	
Liberal	Ann Hines	238	6.64%	−3%
Liberal Democrats	Graham Hulme	207	5.77%	−27%
Green	Mark Coleman	156	4.35%	+3%
Conservative	Pauline Ann Shuttleworth	150	4.18%	+2.8%
TUSC	Ann Barbara Walsh	68	1.90%	
Majority		1,219		
Turnout		3,586	32.43%	−32%
Rejected ballots		13		
Labour hold		Swing		

=== Woolton ===
Woolton
Party	Candidate	Votes	%	±%
Labour	Colin McAlley	1,536	38.51%	
Liberal Democrats	Malcolm Kelly *	1,375	33.60%	−17%
Conservative	Adam Marsden	772	18.87%	−2.7%
Green	Ben Owen	272	6.65%	+3.85%
Liberal	Maria Langley	97	2.37%	
Majority		201		
Turnout		4,092	38.92%	−27.6%
Rejected ballots		25		
Labour gain from Liberal Democrats		Swing		

=== Yew Tree ===
Yew Tree
Party	Candidate	Votes	%	±%
Labour	Tony Conception *	2,596	78.64%	+20.3%
Green	Will Ward	260	7.88%	+6%
Conservative	Pat Waddington	239	7.24%	+0.5%
Liberal	Tracey Samantha Hawksford	206	6.24%	+1.9%
Majority		2,336		
Turnout		3,301	28.36%	−28.3%
Rejected ballots		25		
Labour hold		Swing		
