= Grassendale and Cressington (Liverpool ward) =

Metropolitan borough council ward in Liverpool, England

Coordinates: 53.359°N 2.917°W

Grassendale and Cressington Grassendale (1980–2004) Cressington (2004-2023)
- Grassendale and Cressington ward within Liverpool
- Population: 5,832 (2021 census)
- Registered Electors: 4,635 (2023 election)
- Metropolitan borough: City of Liverpool
- Metropolitan county: Merseyside
- Region: North West
- Country: England
- Sovereign state: United Kingdom
- UK Parliament: Liverpool Garston
- Councillors: Richard Clein (Liberal Democrat)

Grassendale and Cressington ward is an electoral division of Liverpool City Council in the Liverpool Garston Parliamentary constituency, in the Garston area of Liverpool.

== Background ==
The ward was established as the Grassendale ward in 1980 which was replaced by the Cressington ward in 2004, becoming Grassendale and Cressington in 2023.

=== 1980 boundaries ===
1980 ward

A report of the Local Government Boundary Commission for England published in November 1978 set out proposals for changes to the wards of Liverpool City Council, maintaining the number of councillors at 99 representing 33 wards. Grassendale ward was represented by three councillors.

The report describes the boundaries of Grassendale ward as "Commencing at a point where the southwestern boundary of the City meets the southeastern boundary of Aigburth Ward, thence generally northeastwards along said ward boundary to the southern boundary of Church Ward, thence north-eastwards along said boundary to Mather Avenue, thence southeastwards along said avenue to Forthlin Road, thence southwestwards along said road to Yorkaster Road, thence southeastwards along said road to Hurstlyn Road, thence southwestwards along said road to Greenhill Road, thence southeast-wards and southwestwards along said road and Whitehedge Road to St Mary's Road, thence southeastwards along said road to Dock Road, thence southwest-wards along said road to its end and continuing due southwestwards to the southwestern boundary of the City, thence northwestwards along said boundary to the point of commencement".

=== 2004 boundaries ===
2004 ward

Cressington ward was created for the 2004 municipal election from parts of the former Grassendale ward, and small sections of the former St. Mary's and Allerton wards. The ward boundaries were Mather Avenue, Woolton Road, the Northern Line, Garston Way, Dock Road, the River Mersey, Beechwood Road, Riversdale Road, Aigburth Hall Avenue, and Booker Avenue.

The population of the ward at the 2011 census was 14,503, and at the 2021 census 15,154.

=== 2023 boundaries ===
In 2023 the ward boundaries were changed following a 2022 review by the Local Government Boundary Commission for England, which decided that the previous 30 wards each represented by three Councillors should be replaced by 64 wards represented by 85 councillors with varying representation by one, two or three councillors per ward. The ward was reformed as Grassendale and Cressington, being represented by one councillor. The ward was formed from part of the former Cressington ward.

The current ward boundaries are Beechwood Road, behind The Serpentine, Aigburth Hall Road, Glenhead Road, behind Stairhaven Road, Greenhill Road, Whitehedge Road, Garston Old Road, and behind Salisbury Road. The ward contains St Mary's Church, Grassendale, Cressington railway station and the Cressington Park and Grassendale Park estates.

== Councillors ==
| Election | Councillor | Councillor | Councillor |
|---|---|---|---|
| 1980 | Ernest Pine (Con) | Thomas Hobday (Con) | John Lea (Con) |
| 1982 | Ernest Pine (Con) | Thomas Hobday (Con) | John Lea (Con) |
| 1983 | Ernest Pine (Con) | Gerry Scott (Lib) | John Lea (Con) |
| 1984 | Ernest Pine (Con) | Gerry Scott (Lib) | J.C. Greenwood (Lib) |
| 1986 | Beatrice Fraenkel (Alliance) | Gerry Scott (Lib) | J.C. Greenwood (Lib) |
| 1987 | Beatrice Fraenkel (Alliance) | Gerry Scott (Lib) | J.C. Greenwood (Lib) |
| 1988 | Beatrice Fraenkel (Alliance) | Gerry Scott (Lib) | W. Bullock (SLD) |
| 1990 | Beatrice Fraenkel (LD) | Gerry Scott (LD) | W. Bullock (LD) |
| 1991 | Beatrice Fraenkel (LD) | Gerry Scott (LD) | W. Bullock (LD) |
| 1992 | Beatrice Fraenkel (LD) | Gerry Scott (LD) | G. Smith (LD) |
| 1994 | Beatrice Fraenkel (LD) | Gerry Scott (LD) | G. Smith (LD) |
| 1995 | Beatrice Fraenkel (LD) | Gerry Scott (LD) | G. Smith (LD) |
| 1996 | Beatrice Fraenkel (LD) | Gerry Scott (LD) | Chris Curry (LD) |
| 1998 | Beatrice Fraenkel (LD) | Gerry Scott (LD) | Chris Curry (LD) |
| 1999 | Beatrice Fraenkel (LD) | Gerry Scott (LD) | Chris Curry (LD) |
| 2000 | Beatrice Fraenkel (LD) | Gerry Scott (LD) | Chris Curry (LD) |
| 2002 | Beatrice Fraenkel (LD) | Gerry Scott (LD) | Chris Curry (LD) |
| 2003 | Beatrice Fraenkel (LD) | Gerry Scott (LD) | Chris Curry (LD) |
WARD REFORMED
| 2004 | Richard Oglethorpe (LD) | Peter Millea (LD) | Beatrice Fraenkel (LD) |
| 2006 | Richard Oglethorpe (LD) | Peter Millea (LD) | Beatrice Fraenkel (LD) |
| 2007 | Richard Oglethorpe (LD) | Peter Millea (LD) | Beatrice Fraenkel (LD) |
| 2008 | Richard Oglethorpe (LD) | Peter Millea (LD) | Paula Keaveney (LD) |
| 2010 | Richard Oglethorpe (LD) | Peter Millea (LD) | Paula Keaveney (LD) |
| 2011 | Richard Oglethorpe (LD) | Bill Jones (Lab) | Paula Keaveney (LD) |
| 2012 | Richard Oglethorpe (LD) | Bill Jones (Lab) | Mary Aspinall (Lab) |
| 2014 | Lynnie Hinnigan (Lab) | Bill Jones (Lab) | Mary Aspinall (Lab) |
| 2015 | Lynnie Hinnigan (Lab) | Bill Jones (Lab) | Mary Aspinall (Lab) |
| 2016 | Lynnie Hinnigan (Lab) | Bill Jones (Lab) | Tricia O'Brien (Lab) |
| 2018 | Lynnie Hinnigan (Lab) | Bill Jones (Lab) | Tricia O'Brien (Lab) |
| 2019 | Lynnie Hinnigan (Lab) | Sam Gorst (Lab) | Tricia O'Brien (Lab) |
| 2021 | Lynnie Hinnigan (Lab) | Sam Gorst (Ind) | Richard Clein (LD) |
WARD REFORMED
| 2023 | Richard Clein (LD) | | |

indicates seat up for re-election after boundary changes.

indicates seat up for re-election.

indicates change in affiliation.

indicates seat up for re-election after casual vacancy.

== Election results ==
=== Elections of the 2020s ===
4 May 2023
| Party | Candidate | Votes | % | ±% |
|---|---|---|---|---|
| **Liberal Democrats** | **Richard Clein^{§}** | **1,073** | **56.12** | |
| Labour | Eileen Francis Walsh | 568 | 29.71 | |
| Green | Ceri Rhys Jones | 228 | 11.92 | |
| Conservative | Derek Thomas Nuttall | 43 | 2.25 | |
| Majority | | 505 | 26.41 | |
| Turnout | | 1,912 | 41.25 | |
| Rejected ballots | | 17 | 0.88 | |
| Total ballots | | 1,929 | 41.36 | |
| Registered electors | | 4,635 | | |
| Liberal Democrats **win** (new seat) | | | | |

^{§}Richard Clein was a re-standing councillor for Cressington ward.

6 May 2021
| Party | Candidate | Votes | % | ±% |
|---|---|---|---|---|
| **Liberal Democrats** | **Richard Clein** | **2,448** | **49.45** | **▲8.39** |
| Labour | Patricia O'Brien | 1684 | 34.02 | ▼8.62 |
| Green | Jean-Paul Roberts | 560 | 11.31 | ▼0.25 |
| Conservative | Pauline Ann Shuttleworth | 156 | 3.15 | ▼1.59 |
| TUSC | Alex Smith | 102 | 2.06 | n/a |
| Majority | | 764 | 15.43 | ▲13.86 |
| Turnout | | 4,950 | 41.80 | ▲3.36 |
| Rejected ballots | | 80 | 1.59 | ▼0.78 |
| Total ballots | | 5,030 | 42.47 | |
| Registered electors | | 11,843 | | |
| Liberal Democrats **hold** | | Swing | 8.51 | |

=== Elections of the 2010s ===
Liverpool City Council Municipal Elections 2019: 2nd May 2019
| Party | Candidate | Votes | % | ±% |
|---|---|---|---|---|
| **Labour** | **Sam Gorst** | **1,896** | **42.64** | **▼9.80** |
| Liberal Democrats | Norman Mills | 1,826 | 41.06 | ▲7.46 |
| Green | Jean-Paul Roberts | 514 | 11.56 | ▲4.22 |
| Conservative | Christopher Matthew Hall | 211 | 4.74 | ▼1.89 |
| Majority | | 70 | 1.57 | ▼17.27 |
| Turnout | | 4,482 | 38.44 | ▼1.85 |
| Registered electors | | 11,659 | | |
| Rejected ballots | | 35 | 0.78 | ▲0.69 |
| Labour **hold** | | Swing | -8.63 | |

Liverpool City Council Municipal Elections 2018: 3rd May 2018
| Party | Candidate | Votes | % | ±% |
|---|---|---|---|---|
| **Labour** | **Lynnie Hinnigan** | **2,444** | **52.44** | **▲3.86** |
| Liberal Democrats | Norman Mills | 1,566 | 33.60 | ▲3.17 |
| Green | Elke Weissmann | 342 | 7.34 | ▼2.03 |
| Conservative | Jade Louise Marsden | 309 | 6.63 | ▼1.62 |
| Majority | | 878 | 18.84 | ▲0.69 |
| Turnout | | 4,665 | 40.29 | ▲1.07 |
| Registered electors | | 11,578 | | |
| Rejected ballots | | 4 | 0.09 | |
| Labour **hold** | | Swing | ▲0.34 | |

Liverpool City Council Municipal Elections 2016: 5th May 2016
| Party | Candidate | Votes | % | ±% |
|---|---|---|---|---|
| Labour | **Tricia O'Brien** | 2,168 | 48.58% | −7.99% |
| Liberal Democrats | Anna Clare Martin | 1,358 | 30.43% | +12.07% |
| Green | James Joseph Myles | 418 | 9.37% | −1.22% |
| Conservative | Jade Marsden | 368 | 8.25% | −4.39% |
| TUSC | Martin Cavanagh | 151 | 3.38% | +1.53% |
| Majority | | 810 | 18.15% | −20.06% |
| Registered electors | | 11,489 | | |
| Turnout | | 4,506 | 39.22% | −31.11% |
| Labour **hold** | | Swing | -10.03% | |

Liverpool City Council Municipal Elections 2015: 7th May 2015
| Party | Candidate | Votes | % | ±% |
|---|---|---|---|---|
| Labour | **Bill Jones** | 4,647 | 56.57% | +9.51% |
| Liberal Democrats | Anna Clare Martin | 1,508 | 18.36% | −2.00% |
| Conservative | Jade Marsden | 1038 | 12.64% | +5.23% |
| Green | James Joseph Myles | 870 | 10.59% | +1.22% |
| TUSC | Elise Kathryn Khan | 152 | 1.85% | n/a |
| Majority | | 3,139 | 38.21% | +11.51% |
| Registered electors | | 11,760 | | |
| Turnout | | 8,271 | 70.33% | +33.00% |
| Labour **hold** | | Swing | 5.76% | |

Liverpool City Council Municipal Elections 2014: 22nd May 2014
| Party | Candidate | Votes | % | ±% |
|---|---|---|---|---|
| Labour | **Lynnie Hinnigan** | 2,039 | 47.06% | +0.62% |
| Liberal Democrats | Dominic Andrew McCaffrey | 882 | 20.36% | −23.51% |
| UKIP | Austin Lucas | 540 | 12.46% | n/a |
| Green | Martin Trevor Randall | 406 | 9.37% | +4.05% |
| Conservative | Jade Louise Marsden | 321 | 7.41% | +3.04% |
| Liberal | Maureen Keyes | 145 | 3.35% | n/a |
| Majority | | 1,157 | 26.70% | +24.13% |
| Turnout | | 4,333 | 37.33% | −5.75% |
| Labour **gain** from Liberal Democrats | | Swing | +12.07% | |

Liverpool City Council Municipal Elections 2012: 3rd May 2012
| Party | Candidate | Votes | % | ±% |
|---|---|---|---|---|
| Labour | **Mary Aspinall** | **2295** | **46.44%** | −7.09% |
| Liberal Democrats | Paula Keaveney | 2168 | 43.87% | +16.57% |
| Green | Mark Kendal Bowman | 263 | 5.32% | +0.63% |
| Conservative | David Michael John Jeffery | 216 | 4.37% | −5.24% |
| Majority | | 127 | 2.57% | −23.67% |
| Turnout | | 4942 | 43.08% | −4.64% |
| Labour **gain** from Liberal Democrats | | Swing | -23.66% | |

Liverpool City Council Municipal Elections 2011: 5th May 2011
| Party | Candidate | Votes | % | ±% |
|---|---|---|---|---|
| Labour | **Bill Jones** | **2879** | **53.53%** | +9.23% |
| Liberal Democrats | Peter Millea | 1468 | 27.30% | −10.03% |
| Conservative | Paul Athans | 517 | 9.61% | −3.88% |
| Green | Mark Kendal Bowman | 252 | 4.69% | +0.52% |
| UKIP | Mike Lane | 181 | 3.37% | n/a |
| Liberal | Russell Leslie Jamieson | 81 | 1.51% | +0.8% |
| Majority | | 1411 | 26.24% | +19.27% |
| Turnout | | 5378 | 47.72% | −15.07% |
| Labour **gain** from Liberal Democrats | | Swing | 9.63% | |

Liverpool City Council Municipal Elections 2010: Cressington
| Party | Candidate | Votes | % | ±% |
|---|---|---|---|---|
| Liberal Democrats | **Richard Oglethorpe** | **3127** | **44.30%** | |
| Labour | Anna Briggs | 2635 | 37.33% | |
| Conservative | Paul Athans | 952 | 13.49% | |
| Green | Mark Kendal Bowman | 294 | 4.17% | |
| Liberal | Michael Alan Williams | 50 | 0.71% | |
| Majority | | 492 | 6.97% | |
| Turnout | | 7058 | 62.79% | |
| Liberal Democrats **hold** | | Swing | | |

=== Elections of the 2000s ===
Liverpool City Council Municipal Elections 2008: Cressington
| Party | Candidate | Votes | % | ±% |
|---|---|---|---|---|
| Liberal Democrats | **Paula Keaveney** | **1812** | **50.17%** | |
| Labour | Anna Briggs | 792 | 21.93% | |
| Conservative | Paul Athans | 638 | 17.66% | |
| Green | Martin Trevor Randall | 262 | 7.25% | |
| Liberal | John Pagan | 108 | 2.99% | |
| Majority | | | | |
| Turnout | | 3612 | 32.27% | |
| Liberal Democrats **hold** | | Swing | | |

Liverpool City Council Municipal Elections 2007: Cressington
| Party | Candidate | Votes | % | ±% |
|---|---|---|---|---|
| Liberal Democrats | **Peter Millea** | **2065** | **56.44%** | |
| Labour | Anna Briggs | 643 | 17.57% | |
| Conservative | Richard Michael Downey | 383 | 10.47% | |
| Independent | Alex Corina | 316 | 8.64% | |
| Green | Richard De Pesando | 166 | 4.54% | |
| Liberal | John Moore | 86 | 2.35% | |
| Majority | | | | |
| Turnout | | 3659 | 33.09% | |
| Liberal Democrats **hold** | | Swing | | |

Liverpool City Council Municipal Elections 2006: Cressington
| Party | Candidate | Votes | % | ±% |
|---|---|---|---|---|
| Liberal Democrats | **Richard Oglethorpe** | **1856** | **52.52%** | |
| Labour | Catherine Dooley | 778 | 22.01% | |
| Conservative | Emlyn Williams | 381 | 10.78 | |
| Green | Richard De Pesando | 292 | 8.26% | |
| Liberal | John Moore | 227 | 6.42% | |
| Majority | | | | |
| Turnout | | 3534 | 31.41% | |
| Liberal Democrats **hold** | | Swing | | |

After the boundary change of 2004 the whole of Liverpool City Council faced election. Three Councillors were returned.

Liverpool City Council Municipal Elections 2004: Cressington
| Party | Candidate | Votes | % | ±% |
|---|---|---|---|---|
| Liberal Democrats | **Beatrice Fraenkel** | **2747** | | |
| Liberal Democrats | **Peter Millea** | **2536** | | |
| Liberal Democrats | **Richard Oglethorpe** | **2283** | | |
| Labour | Catherine Dooley | 933 | | |
| Labour | Sarah Pippard | 822 | | |
| Labour | Mary Rasmussen | 652 | | |
| Green | Alex Ferguson | 534 | | |
| Conservative | James Berry | 506 | | |
| Conservative | Derek Nuttall | 387 | | |
| Liberal | Catherine Hancox | 361 | | |
| Conservative | Maureen Williams | 356 | | |
| Liberal | Joseph Flannery | 350 | | |
| Majority | | | | |
| Turnout | | 4839 | 42.72% | |
| Liberal Democrats **win** (new seat) | | | | |
| Liberal Democrats **win** (new seat) | | | | |
| Liberal Democrats **win** (new seat) | | | | |

•bold - Denotes the winning candidate.
•italics - Denotes sitting Councillor.
