= Allerton (Liverpool ward) =

Metropolitan borough council ward in Liverpool, England

Allerton Allerton & Hunts Cross (2004-2023)
- Allerton ward within Liverpool
- Population: 5,464 (2021 census)
- Registered Electors: 4,286 (2023 elections)
- Metropolitan borough: City of Liverpool
- Metropolitan county: Merseyside
- Region: North West
- Country: England
- Sovereign state: United Kingdom
- UK Parliament: Liverpool Garston
- Councillors: Andrew Makinson (Liberal Democrat)

Allerton ward is an electoral district of Liverpool City Council within the Liverpool Garston Parliamentary constituency.

== Background ==
The ward was created in 1920 from the former Allerton, Childwall & Little Woolton ward. Its boundaries were changed for the 1953, 1973 and 1980 elections.

=== 1953 boundaries ===
1954 ward boundaries

=== 1980 boundaries ===
1980 ward boundaries

A report of the Local Government Boundary Commission for England published in November 1978 set out proposals for changes to the wards of Liverpool City Council, maintaining the number of councillors at 99 representing 33 wards. Aigburth ward was represented by three councillors.

The report describes the boundaries as "Commencing at a point where the eastern boundary of the City meets the West Allerton - Widnes railway, thence westwards and northwestwards along said railway to the eastern boundary of Grassendale Ward, thence generally northwestwards along said boundary to the southern boundary of Church Ward, thence eastwards along said boundary to the southwestern boundary of Woolton Ward, thence southeast wards along said boundary and generally eastwards along the southern boundary of said ward to the eastern boundary of the City, thence southwards along said boundary to the point of commencement".

=== 2004 election ===
2004 ward boundaries

The ward was renamed as Allerton and Hunts Cross however the newly named ward retained the majority of the former ward, losing the area around Calderstones Park to the new Church ward and small parts of the new Cressington and Woolton wards, and gaining another area of Woolton ward.

The ward boundaries followed Menlove Avenue, through Woolton Woods, School Lane, Speke Road, Kings Drive, Out Lane, Halewood Road, Mackets Lane, Hillfoot Avenue, the West Coast Main Line, Mather Avenue, Booker Avenue and Yewtree Road.

The population of the ward at the 2021 census of 15,240.

=== 2023 boundaries ===
The 2022 review by the Local Government Boundary Commission for England decided that the existing 30 wards each represented by three Councillors should be replaced by 64 wards represented by 85 councillors with varying representation by one, two or three councillors per ward. The Allerton ward was recreated as a smaller, single-member ward from a section of the previous Church and Allerton and Hunts Cross wards.

The new ward boundaries follow Rose Lane, the West Coast Main Line, Booker Avenue, Mather Avenue, Heath Road, Menlove Avenue, and Allerton Road.

== Councillors ==
Election	Councillor	Councillor	Councillor
(1920-1980)
1980	William Fearnside (Con)	James Ross (Con)	Sheila Crane (Con)
1982	T. Morrison (Con)	James Ross (Con)	Sheila Crane (Con)
1983	T. Morrison (Con)	James Ross (Con)	Sheila Crane (Con)
1984	T. Morrison (Con)	James Ross (Con)	Sheila Crane (Con)
1986	Flo Clucas (All)	James Ross (Con)	Sheila Crane (Con)
1987	Flo Clucas (All)	F.S. Roderick (SDP)	Sheila Crane (Con)
1988	Flo Clucas (All)	F.S. Roderick (SDP)	T. Smith (Lab)
1990	Flo Clucas (LD)	F.S. Roderick (SDP)	T. Smith (Lab)
1991	Flo Clucas (LD)	Vera Best (LD)	T. Smith (Lab)
1992	Flo Clucas (LD)	Vera Best (LD)	W. Bullock (LD)
1994	Flo Clucas (LD)	Vera Best (LD)	W. Bullock (LD)
1995	Flo Clucas (LD)	Vera Best (LD)	W. Bullock (LD)
1996	Flo Clucas (LD)	Vera Best (LD)	Rosie Cooper (LD)
1998	Flo Clucas (LD)	Vera Best (LD)	Rosie Cooper (LD)
1999	Flo Clucas (LD)	Vera Best (LD)	Rosie Cooper (LD)
2000	Flo Clucas (LD)	Vera Best (LD)	Rosie Cooper (LD)
2002	Flo Clucas (LD)	Vera Best (LD)	John Clucas (LD)
2003	Flo Clucas (LD)	Vera Best (LD)	John Clucas (LD)
WARD REFORMED AS ALLERTON & HUNTS CROSS WARD
2004	Vera Best (LD)	John Clucas (LD)	Flo Clucas (LD)
2006	Vera Best (LD)	John Clucas (LD)	Flo Clucas (LD)
2007	Vera Best (LD)	John Clucas (LD)	Flo Clucas (LD)
2008	Vera Best (LD)	John Clucas (LD)	Flo Clucas (LD)
2010	Vera Best (LD)	John Clucas (LD)	Flo Clucas (LD)
2011	Vera Best (LD)	Ian Jobling (Lab)	Flo Clucas (LD)
2012	Vera Best (LD)	Ian Jobling (Lab)	Dan Hughes (Lab)
2012	Rachael O'Byrne (Lab)^{[a]}	Ian Jobling (Lab)	Dan Hughes (Lab)
2014	Rachael O'Byrne (Lab)	Ian Jobling (Lab)	Dan Hughes (Lab)
2015	Rachael O'Byrne (Lab)	Sharon Connor (Lab)	Dan Hughes (Lab)
2016	Rachael O'Byrne (Lab)	Sharon Connor (Lab)	Mirna Juarez (LD)
2018	Kimberley Berry (Lab)	Sharon Connor (Lab)	Mirna Juarez (LD)
2019	Kimberley Berry (Lab)	Sharon Connor (Lab)	Mirna Juarez (LD)
2021	Kimberley Berry (Lab)	Sharon Connor (Lab)	Mirna Juarez (LD)
WARD REFORMED AS ALLERTON WARD
2023	Andrew Makinson (LD)		

indicates seat up for re-election after boundary changes.

indicates seat up for re-election.

indicates change in affiliation.

indicates seat up for re-election after casual vacancy.

=== Notes ===
a. Cllr Vera Best (Liberal Democrat, 2010) resigned from the council in 2012 citing ill health.

== Election results ==
=== Elections of the 2020s ===
4th May 2023
Party	Candidate	Votes	%	±%
Liberal Democrats	Andrew Kendrick Makinson (Note: Andrew Makinson was a re-standing councillor for the former Church ward.)	1,143	61.95	
Labour	Clare Agnes McIntyre (Note: Clare McIntyre was a re-standing councillor for the former Wavertree ward.)	445	24.12	
Green	Rosalyn Morton	193	10.46	
Conservative	Nathan Gallimore-King	64	3.47	
Majority		698	37.83	
Turnout		1,845	43.05	
Rejected ballots		8	0.43	
Total ballots		1853		
Registered electors		4,286		
Liberal Democrats win (new seat)				

6th May 2021
Party	Candidate	Votes	%	±%
Liberal Democrats	Mirna Juarez	2,244	50.26	▲12.92
Labour	Mark Steven Norris	1,451	32.50	▼18.14
Green	Maggi Williams	300	6.72	▼0.64
Conservative	Denise Mary Nuttall	210	4.70	▲0.05
Liberal	Niall Hutchinson	179	4.01	N/A
TUSC	Adam Carl Smith	81	1.81	N/A
Majority		793	17.76	▲4.45
Turnout		4,465	38.70	▼0.57
Rejected ballots		54	1.19	▲0.41
Total ballots		4,519	39.17	
Registered electors		11,536		
Liberal Democrats hold		Swing	+15.53	

=== Elections of the 2010s ===
Thursday 2nd May 2019
Party	Candidate	Votes	%	±%
Labour	Sharon Connor	2,318	50.64	▲6.38
Liberal Democrats	Fiona McBride	1,709	37.34	▼5.18
Green	Maggi Williams	337	7.36	▲1.91
Conservative	Denise Mary Nuttall	213	4.65	▼2.98
Majority		609	13.31	▲11.57
Turnout		4,541	39.27	▲2.52
Rejected ballots		36	0.78	▲0.64
Total ballots		4,577	39.58	
Registered electors		11,565		
Labour hold		Swing	+5.78	

Thursday 3rd May 2018
Party	Candidate	Votes	%	±%
Labour	Kimberley Jane Berry	1,885	44.26	▲8.19
Liberal Democrats	Steve Brauner	1,811	42.52	▼4.11
Conservative	Denise Mary Nuttall	325	7.63	▼0.19
Green	Maggi Williams	232	5.45	▼0.95
Majority		74	1.74	▼8.83
Turnout		4,253	36.75	▼2.81
Rejected ballots		6	0.14	
Total ballots		4,259	36.80	
Registered electors		11,589		
Labour hold		Swing	+6.15	

Thursday 5th May 2016
Party	Candidate	Votes	%	±%
Liberal Democrats	Mirna Lizzett Juarez	2,105	46.63	▲27.95
Labour	Ged Gibbons	1,628	36.07	▼18.92
Conservative	Johnathan Peter Andrew	353	7.82	▼6.20
Green	Maggi Williams	289	6.40	▼1.65
Liberal	Irene Lillian Morrison	89	1.97	▲0.70
Majority		477	10.57	▼25.74
Turnout		4,464	39.56	▼29.69
Rejected ballots		50		
Total ballots		4,514		
Registered electors				
Liberal Democrats gain from Labour		Swing	+23.44	

Thursday 7th May 2015
Party	Candidate	Votes	%	±%
Labour	Sharon Connor	4,339	54.99	▲3.87
Liberal Democrats	Mirna Lizzett Juarez	1,474	18.68	▼5.74
Conservative	Giselle Henrietta McDonald	1,106	14.02	▲3.06
Green	Neil Patterson	635	8.05	▼2.30
TUSC	Annie Chambers	237	3.00	N/A
Liberal	Irene Lillian Morrison	100	1.27	▼0.89
Majority		2,865	36.31	▲10.61
Turnout		7,891	69.25	+34.50
Rejected ballots		55		
Total ballots		7,946		
Registered electors				
Labour hold		Swing	5.30	

Thursday 22nd May 2014
Party	Candidate	Votes	%	±%
Labour	Rachael O'Byrne	1,991	51.12	▼6.26
Liberal Democrats	Mirna Lizzett Juarez	990	25.42	▲3.10
Conservative	Christopher James Halligan	427	10.96	▲1.46
Green	Maggi Williams	403	10.35	▲7.30
Liberal	Irene Lillian Morrison	84	2.16	▼4.37
Majority		1,001	25.70	▼9.36
Turnout		3,895	34.75	
Labour hold		Swing	-4.68	

Allerton & Hunts Cross By-Election: Thursday 5th July 2012
Party	Candidate	Votes	%	±%
Labour	Rachel O'Byrne	1,450	57.38	▼4.35
Liberal Democrats	Mirna Lizzett Juarez	564	22.32	▲4.51
Conservative	Christopher Matthew Hall	240	9.50	▲0.01
Liberal	Christopher Hulme	165	6.53	▲1.50
Green	Maggi Williams	77	3.05	▼2.89
TUSC	Lynne Wild	31	1.23	N/A
Majority		886	35.06	▼} 8.86
Turnout		2,527		
Labour gain from Liberal Democrats		Swing	-4.43	

Thursday 3rd May 2012
Party	Candidate	Votes	%	±%
Labour	Dan Hughes	2,465	61.73	▲6.56
Liberal Democrats	Philip John Wren	711	17.81	▼8.90
Conservative	Lewis Wooding-Smith	379	9.49	▲1.42
Green	Margaret Williams	237	5.94	▲3.04
Liberal	Chris Hulme	201	5.03	▲2.16
Majority		1,754	43.93	▲15.47
Turnout		3,993	36.18	▼6.36
Labour gain from Liberal Democrats		Swing	+7.73	

Thursday 5th May 2011
Party	Candidate	Votes	%	±%
Labour	Ian Jobling	2,572	55.17	▲16.86
Liberal Democrats	John Philip Clucas	1,245	26.71	▼17.15
Conservative	Jade Louise Adamowicz	376	8.07	▼6.00
UKIP	Michelle Long	200	4.29	N/A
Green	Maggi Williams	135	2.90	▼0.86
Liberal	Chris Hulme	134	2.87	N/A
Majority		1,327	28.46	▲22.92
Turnout		4662	42.54	▼22.21
Labour gain from Liberal Democrats		Swing	+17.01	

Thursday 6th May 2010
Party	Candidate	Votes	%	±%
Liberal Democrats	Vera Best	3,148	43.86	▼4.70
Labour	Colin McAlley	2,750	38.31	▲17.61
Conservative	Adam Marsden	1,010	14.07	▼8.23
Green	Margaret Williams	270	3.76	▼1.41
Majority		398	5.54	▼20.72
Turnout		7,178	64.75	▲34.55
Liberal Democrats hold		Swing	-11.16	

=== Elections of the 2000s ===
Thursday 1st May 2008
Party	Candidate	Votes	%	±%
Liberal Democrats	Flo Clucas	1,605	48.56	▼15.33
Conservative	Adam Marsden	737	22.30	N/A
Labour	Colin McAlley	684	20.70	▼4.14
Green	Margaret Williams	171	5.17	▼1.03
Liberal	Christopher Hulme	108	3.27	▼1.80
Majority		868	26.26	▼12.79
Turnout		3305	30.20	▲5.74
Liberal Democrats hold		Swing		

Thursday 3rd May 2007
Party	Candidate	Votes	%	±%
Liberal Democrats	John Clucas	1,700	63.89	▲14.33
Labour	Patrick John Devaney	661	24.84	▲3.81
Green	Margaret Williams	165	6.20	▼0.26
Liberal	Christopher Hulme	135	5.07	▼0.87
Majority		1,039	39.05	▲10.52
Turnout		2,661	24.46	▼5.56
Liberal Democrats hold		Swing	+5.26	

Thursday 4th May 2006
Party	Candidate	Votes	%	±%
Liberal Democrats	Vera Best	1,619	49.56	▼16.22
Labour	Daniel Patrick Hughes	687	21.03	▲1.39
Conservative	Brenda Coppell	556	17.02	▲4.54
Green	Margaret Williams	211	6.46	N/A
Liberal	Christopher Hulme	194	5.94	▼0.17
Majority		932	28.53	▲18.74
Turnout		3,267	30.02	▼13.28
Liberal Democrats hold		Swing		

Thursday 10 June 2004 (Note: Following boundary changes the whole council faced re-election. Three members were elected.)
Party	Candidate	Votes	%	±%
Liberal Democrats	Flo Clucas	3,058	65.78	
Liberal Democrats	John Clucas	2,603	55.99	
Liberal Democrats	Veronica Best	2,409	51.82	
Labour	William Braben	913	19.64	
Labour	David Shepherd	733	15.77	
Labour	Carol Crofts	726	15.62	
Conservative	Brenda Coppell	580	12.48	
Conservative	Norman Coppell	564	12.13	
Conservative	Mark Bill	510	10.97	
Liberal	Christopher Hulme	284	6.11	
Majority		455	9.79	
Turnout		4,649	43.30	
Liberal Democrats win (new seat)				
Liberal Democrats win (new seat)				
Liberal Democrats win (new seat)				

Thursday 1st May 2003
Party	Candidate	Votes	%	±%
Liberal Democrats	Vera Best	1,599	52.31	▼2.87
Labour	Laurence Freeman	603	19.73	▲0.46
Conservative	Mark Bill	536	17.53	▲3.10
Liberal	Christopher Hulme	185	6.05	▼2.03
Green	Andrew Hoban	134	4.38	▲1.34
Majority		996	32.58	▼3.33
Turnout		3,057	25.18	▼5.49
Registered electors		12,139		
Liberal Democrats hold		Swing	-1.66	

Thursday 2nd May 2002
Party	Candidate	Votes	%	±%
Liberal Democrats	Flo Clucas	2,050	55.18	▼5.69
Labour	Laurence Freeman	716	19.27	▲4.55
Conservative	Mark Bill	536	14.43	▼5.79
Liberal	Christopher Hulme	300	8.08	N/A
Green	Eleanor Martin	113	3.04	▼1.16
Majority		1,334	35.91	▼4.74
Turnout		3,715	30.67	▲7.99
Registered electors		12,113		
Liberal Democrats hold		Swing	-5.12	

Thursday 4th May 2000
Party	Candidate	Votes	%	±%
Liberal Democrats	John Clucas	1,683	60.87	▼6.93
Conservative	Mark Bill	559	20.22	▲10.72
Labour	G. Martin	407	14.72	▼1.01
Green	R.Cantwell	116	4.20	▲2.17
Majority		1,276	40.65	▼11.42
Turnout		2,765	22.68	▼7.11
Registered electors		12,193		
Liberal Democrats hold		Swing	-8.82	

=== Elections of the 1990s ===
Thursday 6th May 1999
Party	Candidate	Votes	%	±%
Liberal Democrats	Vera Best	2,470	67.80	▲7.67
Labour	D. Garmann	573	15.73	▼1.58
Conservative	M. E. Bill	346	9.50	▼2.59
Green	R. E. Cantwell	74	2.03	N/A
Independent	C. Hulme	180	4.94	▼5.53
Majority		1,897	52.07	▲9.25
Turnout		3,643	29.79	▲2.19
Registered electors		12,229		
Liberal Democrats hold		Swing	+4.63	

Thursday 7th May 1998
Party	Candidate	Votes	%	±%
Liberal Democrats	Flo Clucas	2,015	60.13	▲11.32
Labour	P. Rhodes	580	17.31	▼8.42
Conservative	M.E. Bill	405	12.09	▲0.70
Allerton Lib Dem Ward Resident	C. Hulme	351	10.47	▼2.00
Majority		1,435	42.82	▲19.75
Turnout		3,351	27.60	▼5.66
Registered electors		12,142		
Liberal Democrats hold		Swing	+9.87	

Thursday 2nd May 1996
Party	Candidate	Votes	%	±%
Liberal Democrats	Rosie Cooper	1,946	48.81	▼2.52
Labour	M. Bailey	1,026	25.73	▼7.67
Allerton Liberal Democrats	C. Hulme	497	12.47	N/A
Conservative	F. Bate	454	11.39	▼1.65
Green	R. Cantwell	64	1.61	▼0.44
Majority		920	23.07	▲5.13
Turnout		3,987	33.26	▼1.82
Registered electors		11,986		
Liberal Democrats hold		Swing	+2.57	

Thursday 4th May 1995
Party	Candidate	Votes	%	±%
Liberal Democrats	Vera Best	2,158	51.33	▼7.37
Labour	G. Jones	1,404	33.40	▲4.85
Conservative	F. Bate	548	13.04	▲1.20
Green	R. Cantwell	86	2.05	▲0.24
Natural Law	S. Cohen	8	0.19	N/A
Majority		754	17.94	▼12.22
Turnout		4,204	35.08	▼6.67
Registered electors		11,985		
Liberal Democrats hold		Swing	-6.11	

Thursday 5th May 1994
Party	Candidate	Votes	%	±%
Liberal Democrats	Flo Clucas	2,951	58.70	▲16.55
Labour	K. Dovaston	1,435	28.55	▲4.85
Conservative	G. Brandwood	595	11.84	▼19.63
Green	R. Cantwell	91	1.81	▲0.05
Majority		1,516	30.16	▲19.48
Turnout		5,027	41.75	▲4.82
Registered electors		12,041		
Liberal Democrats hold		Swing	+5.85	

Thursday 7th May 1992
Party	Candidate	Votes	%	±%
Liberal Democrats	W. Bullock	1,887	42.15	▼5.09
Conservative	S. North	1,409	31.47	▲11.21
Labour	Mary Anderson	1,061	23.70	▼3.09
Green	R. Cantwell	79	1.76	▼1.32
SDP	I. Garbett	41	0.92	▼1.71
Majority		478	10.68	▼9.77
Turnout		4,477	36.93	▼11.43
Registered electors		12,123		
Liberal Democrats gain from Labour		Swing	-8.15	

Thursday 2nd May 1991
Party	Candidate	Votes	%	±%
Liberal Democrats	Vera Best	2,749	47.24	▲3.53
Labour	G. Martin	1,559	26.79	▼8.75
Conservative	S. North	1,179	20.26	▲5.29
Green	R. Cantwell	179	3.08	▼0.54
SDP	Ron Gould	153	2.63	▲0.48
Majority		1,190	20.45	▲12.28
Turnout		5,819	48.36	▼4.14
Registered electors		12,033		
Liberal Democrats gain from SDP		Swing	6.14	

Thursday 3rd May 1990
Party	Candidate	Votes	%	±%
Liberal Democrats	Flo Clucas	2,750	43.71	▲14.92
Labour	K. E. Neary	2,236	35.54	▼0.04
Conservative	P. Lee	942	14.97	▼11.90
Green	R. E. Cantwell	228	3.62	▲1.87
SDP	Ron Gould	135	2.15	▼4.85
Majority		514	8.17	▲1.38
Turnout		6,291	52.50	▲5.44
Registered electors		11,982		
Liberal Democrats gain from Conservative		Swing	7.48	

=== Elections of the 1980s ===
Thursday 5th May 1988
Party	Candidate	Votes	%	±%
Labour	T. Smith	2,029	35.58	▲14.18
SLD	M. Ali	1,642	28.80	N/A
Conservative	M. Kingston	1,532	26.87	▲6.87
SDP	Ron Gould	399	7.00	▼50.19
Green	R. Cantwell	100	1.75	▲0.34
Majority		387	6.79	▼29.00
Turnout		5,702	47.06	▼11.68
Registered electors		12,116		
Labour gain from Conservative		Swing	+21.29	

Thursday 7th May 1987
Party	Candidate	Votes	%	±%
SDP	F. S. Roderick	4,147	57.19	▲7.37
Labour	Peter Kilfoyle	1,552	21.40	▲2.41
Conservative	M. Kingston	1,450	20.00	▼9.34
Green	R. E. Cantwell	102	1.41	▼0.44
Majority		2,595	35.79	▲15.30
Turnout		7,251	58.74	
Registered electors		12,344		
SDP gain from Conservative		Swing	2.48	

Thursday 1st May 1986
Party	Candidate	Votes	%	±%
Alliance	Flo Clucas	3,264	49.82	▲23.75
Conservative	T. Morrison	1,922	29.34	▼21.06
Labour	Dot Gavin	1,244	18.99	▼4.54
Independent	R. Cantwell	121	1.85	
Majority		1,342	20.49	▼3.83
Turnout		6,551		
Registered electors		12,545		
Alliance gain from Conservative		Swing	22.40	

Thursday 1st May 1984
Party	Candidate	Votes	%	±%
Conservative	Sheila Craine	3,446	50.39	▼6.15
SDP	W. M. Scott	1,783	26.07	▲11.22
Labour	Dawn Booth	1,609	23.53	▼5.09
Majority		1,663	24.32	▼3.60
Turnout		6,838	53.77	▲10.88
Registered electors		12,717		
Conservative hold		Swing	-8.69	

Thursday 5th May 1983
Party	Candidate	Votes	%	±%
Conservative	James Ross	3,092	56.54	▲4.33
SDP	W. M. Scott	812	14.85	▼14.63
Labour	Alex Scott-Samuel	1,565	28.62	▲10.30
Majority		1,527	27.92	▲5.19
Turnout		5,469	42.89	▲1.92
Registered electors		12,752		
Conservative hold		Swing	+9.48	

Thursday 6th May 1982
Party	Candidate	Votes	%	±%
Conservative	T. Morrison	2,731	52.21	▼8.81
SDP	R. Isaacson	1,542	29.48	N/A
Labour	C. R. Frais	958	18.31	▼2.72
Majority		1,189	22.73	▼17.27
Turnout		5,231	40.97	▼0.05
Registered electors		12,769		
Conservative hold		Swing	-10.17	

Thursday 6th May 1980 (Note: Following boundary changes the whole council faced re-election. Three members were elected.)
Party	Candidate	Votes	%	±%
Conservative	Sheila Elizabeth Crane	3,169	61.02	
Conservative	James Stanislaw Ross	3,150	60.66	
Conservative	William Herbert Fearnside	3,135	60.37	
Labour	Hilton Robert Brown	1,092	21.03	
Labour	Michael O'Neill	1,079	20.78	
Labour	John Henry Stamper	1,006	19.37	
Liberal	Thomas Henry Harte	932	17.95	
Liberal	Neville Gordon Chinn	930	17.91	
Liberal	Yetta Jacobs	831	16.00	
Majority		2,077	40.00	
Turnout		5,193	41.02	
Registered electors		12,660		
Conservative hold		Swing		
Conservative hold		Swing		
Conservative hold		Swing		

== See also ==
- Liverpool City Council
- Liverpool City Council elections 1880–present
- Liverpool Town Council elections 1835 - 1879
