= St Michael's (Liverpool ward) =

Electoral ward in Liverpool, UK

Coordinates: 53.381°N 2.944°W

- St Michael's ward within Liverpool
- Population: 5,810 (2021 census)
- Registered Electors: 4,256 (2023 election)
- Metropolitan borough: City of Liverpool
- Metropolitan county: Merseyside
- Region: North West
- Country: England
- Sovereign state: United Kingdom
- UK Parliament: Liverpool Wavertree
- Councillors: Tom Crone (Green)

St Michael’s ward is an electoral district of Liverpool City Council centred on the St Michael's district of Liverpool and within the Liverpool Wavertree Parliamentary constituency.

== Background ==
The ward was created in 1953 and its boundaries were changed for the 1973, 2004 and 2023 elections. Between 1980 and 2004 the ward was disestablished.

=== 1953 boundaries ===
1953 St Michael's ward

The ward was first established in 1953.

=== 1980 elections ===
The ward was disestablished at the 1980 election, where it was distributed into the new Aigburth and Dingle wards.

=== 2004 boundaries ===
2004 St Michael's ward

The ward was re-formed for the 2004 Municipal elections from the former Aigburth and Dingle wards.

The ward boundaries were Promenade Gardens, Dingle Lane, Ullet Lane, Croxteth Gate, Mossley Hill Drive, Aigburth Road, the southeastern property line of Fulwood Drive, and the River Mersey.

The population of the ward at the 2011 census was 12,991, and at the 2021 census of 12,482.

=== 2023 boundaries ===
The ward boundaries were changed in 2023 following a review by the Local Government Boundary Commission for England which decided that the existing 30 wards each represented by three Councillors should be replaced by 64 wards represented by 85 councillors with varying representation by one, two or three councillors per ward. The St Michael's ward was reformed as a single-member ward. The ward boundaries retained the centre of the 2004 ward, losing the southern section to the new Festival Gardens ward and the northern section to the new Sefton Park ward.

== Councillors ==
Election	Councillor	Councillor	Councillor
1980-2003 WARD DISESTABLISHED
2004	Peter Allen (LD)	John Coyne (LD)	Elaine Allen (LD)
2006	Peter Allen (LD)	John Coyne (Green)	Elaine Allen (LD)
2006	Peter Allen (LD)	John Coyne (Green)	Elaine Allen (LD)
2007	Peter Allen (LD)	John Coyne (Green)	Elaine Allen (LD)
2008	Peter Allen (LD)	John Coyne (Green)	Sarah Jennings (Green)
2010	Sharon Green (LD)	John Coyne (Green)	Sarah Jennings (Green)
2011	Sharon Green (LD)	John Coyne (Green)	Sarah Jennings (Green)
2011	Sharon Green (Ind)	John Coyne (Green)	Sarah Jennings (Green)
2012	Sharon Green (Ind)	John Coyne (Green)	Sarah Jennings (Green)
2014	Tom Crone (Green)	John Coyne (Green)	Sarah Jennings (Green)
2015	Tom Crone (Green)	Anna Key (Green)	Sarah Jennings (Green)
2016	Tom Crone (Green)	Anna Key (Green)	Sarah Jennings (Green)
2018	Tom Crone (Green)	Anna Key (Green)	Sarah Jennings (Green)
2019	Tom Crone (Green)	Anna Key (Green)	Sarah Jennings (Green)
2021	Tom Crone (Green)	Anna Key (Green)	Steph Pitchers (Green)
WARD REFORMED
2023	Tom Crone (Green)		

indicates seat up for re-election after boundary changes.

indicates change in affiliation.

indicates seat up for re-election.

- Cllr John Coyne (elected as Liberal Democrat) defected to the Green Party in 2006 and was re-elected with the Green Party twice in 2007 and 2011.
- Cllr Sharon Green (elected as Liberal Democrat) resigned from the whip to sit as an Independent on 6 May 2011 following the suspension of former leader Warren Bradley from the party.

== Election results ==
=== Elections of the 2020s ===
==== 2023 ====
4th May 2023
Party	Candidate	Votes	%	±%
Green	Tom Crone (Note: Tom Crone was a re-standing councillor for the former St Michael's ward.)	1,124	66.96	
Labour	Helen Thompson (Note: Helen Thompson was a re-standing councillor for the former Belle Vale ward.)	427	26.51	
Liberal Democrats	Christopher Michael Collins	40	2.48	
Conservative	Robert Peter Scott	20	1.24	
Majority		697	43.26	
Turnout		1,611	37.85	
Registered electors		4,256		
Rejected ballots		8	0.49	
Total ballots		1,619	38.04	
Green win (new seat)				

==== 2021 ====
6th May 2021
Party	Candidate	Votes	%	±%
Green	Stephanie Louise Pitchers	2,308	57.79	▼9.17
Labour	Portia Eve Fahey	1,362	34.10	▲6.56
Conservative	David Patmore	171	4.28	▲1.94
Liberal Democrats	Chris Collins	153	3.83%	▲0.67
Majority		946	23.69	▼15.73
Turnout		3,994	39.61	▲1.31
Registered electors		10,084		
Rejected ballots		57	1.41	▲0.81
Green hold		Swing	-7.87	

=== Elections of the 2010s ===
==== May 2019 ====
Liverpool City Council election, 2nd May 2019: St Michael's
Party	Candidate	Votes	%	±%
Green	Anna Key	2,458	66.96%	▲8.64
Labour	Calvin Wesley Smeda	1,011	27.54%	▼9.35
Liberal Democrats	Chris Collins	116	3.16%	▲0.99
Conservative	David Patmore	86	2.34%	▼0.28
Majority		1,447	39.42%	▲17.99
Turnout		3,693	38.30%	▼0.32
Registered electors		9,642		
Rejected ballots		22	0.60%	▲0.38
Green hold		Swing	▲9.00	

==== May 2018 ====
Liverpool City Council election, 3 May 2018: St Michael's
Party	Candidate	Votes	%	±%
Green	Tom Crone	2,205	58.3	▼3.7
Labour	Stuart Fordham	1,395	36.9	▲7.9
Conservative	David Patmore	99	2.6	▲0.5
Liberal Democrats	Norman Darbyshire	82	2.2	▼1.7
Majority		810	21.4	▼11.6
Registered electors		9,810		
Turnout		3,789	38.6	▲0.7
Rejected ballots		8	0.2	▼0.7
Green hold		Swing	▼5.8	

==== May 2016 ====
Liverpool City Council election, 5 May 2016: St Michael's
Party	Candidate	Votes	%	±%
Green	Sarah Jennings	2,187	62.0	▲12.1
Labour	Steve Fitzsimmons	1,023	29.0	▼7.4
Liberal Democrats	Thomas Sebire	139	3.9	▲0.3
Conservative	David Patmore	74	2.1	▼2.7
English Democrat	Paul Rimmer	53	1.5	▲1.4
TUSC	Elise Khan	50	1.4	▼0.3
Majority		1,164	33.0	▲19.5
Registered electors		9,399		
Turnout		3,558	37.9	▼30.1
Rejected ballots		32	0.9	▲0.6

==== May 2015 ====
Liverpool City Council election, 7 May 2015: St Michael's
Party	Candidate	Votes	%	±%
Green	Anna Key	3,266	49.9	▼10.2
Labour	Steve Fitzsimmons	2,384	36.4	▲6.0
Conservative	David Patmore	315	4.8	▲1.6
Liberal Democrats	Kris Brown	236	3.6	▲1.3
UKIP	Shashwat Singh	222	3.4	New
TUSC	Giorgio Moulas	111	1.7	▼0.2
English Democrat	Paul Rimmer	9	0.1	▼1.6
Majority		882	13.5	▼16.2
Registered electors		9,648		
Turnout		6,563	68.0	▲30.8
Rejected ballots		20	0.3	▼0.1
Green hold		Swing	▼8.1	

==== May 2014 ====
Liverpool City Council election, 22 May 2014: St Michael's
Party	Candidate	Votes	%	±%
Green	Tom Crone	2,130	60.1	▲6.0
Labour	Patricia O'Brien	1,078	30.4	▼3.5
Conservative	David Patmore	112	3.2	▼1.7
Liberal Democrats	Anna Martin	80	2.3	▼2.6
TUSC	Giorgo Moulas	69	1.9	New
English Democrat	Paul Rimmer	60	1.7	▼0.5
Liberal	Jessica Bull	15	0.4	New
Majority		1,052	29.7	▲9.5
Registered electors		9,554		
Turnout		3,557	37.2	▲2.4
Rejected ballots		13	0.4	▼0.2
Green gain from Independent		Swing	▲4.8	

==== May 2012 ====
Liverpool City Council election, 3 May 2012: St Michael's
Party	Candidate	Votes	%	±%
Green	Sarah Jennings	1,828	54.1	▲3.6
Labour	Patricia O'Brien	1,148	33.9	▼0.3
Liberal Democrats	Anna Martin	166	4.9	▼3.4
Conservative	David Patmore	165	4.9	▲1.3
English Democrat	Paul Rimmer	75	2.2	▲1.5
Majority		680	20.2	▲3.9
Registered electors		9,764		
Turnout		3,402	34.8	▼5.6
Rejected ballots		20	0.6	▲0.1
Green hold		Swing	▲2.0	

==== May 2011 ====
Liverpool City Council election, 5 May 2011: St Michael's
Party	Candidate	Votes	%	±%
Green	John Coyne	1,978	50.5	▲20.1
Labour	Phil Molyneux	1,341	34.2	▲5.2
Liberal Democrats	Linda Farrelly	326	8.3	▼25.7
Conservative	David Patmore	143	3.6	▼3.1
UKIP	Paul Rimmer	70	1.8	New
Liberal	Terry Formby	31	0.8	New
English Democrat	Neil Kenny	29	0.7	New
Majority		637	16.3	N/A
Registered electors		9,741		
Turnout		3,936	40.4	▼18.6
Rejected ballots		18	0.5	▼0.2
Green hold		Swing	▲10.0	

==== May 2010 ====
Liverpool City Council election, 6 May 2010: St Michael's
Party	Candidate	Votes	%	±%
Liberal Democrats	Sharon Green	2,002	34.0	▼2.7
Green	Tom Crone	1,790	30.4	▼12.2
Labour	Matthew Garlick	1,710	29.0	▲13.2
Conservative	David Patmore	394	6.7	▲1.8
Majority		212	3.6	N/A
Registered electors		10,054		
Turnout		5,935	59.0	▲27.2
Rejected ballots		39	0.7	
Liberal Democrats hold		Swing	▲4.8	

=== Elections of the 2000s ===
==== May 2008 ====
Liverpool City Council election, 1 May 2008: St Michael's
Party	Candidate	Votes	%	±%
Green	Sarah Jennings	1,309	42.6	▲4.6
Liberal Democrats	Elaine Allen	1,128	36.7	▲7.5
Labour	Nicholas Mutize	485	15.8	▼10.1
Conservative	David Patmore	149	4.9	▲0.3
Majority		181	5.9	▼2.9
Registered electors		9,706		
Turnout			31.8	▼1.8
Green gain from Liberal Democrats		Swing	▼1.5	

==== May 2007 ====
Liverpool City Council election, 3 May 2007: St Michael's
Party	Candidate	Votes	%	±%
Green	John Coyne	1,232	38.0	▲12.8
Liberal Democrats	Christopher Curry	947	29.2	▼12.3
Labour	Jack Johnson	839	25.9	▲0.9
Conservative	David Patmore	149	4.6	▼3.8
Liberal	George Roberts	75	2.3	New
Majority		285	8.8	N/A
Registered electors		9,662		
Turnout			33.6	▲7.6
Green hold		Swing	▲12.6	

==== May 2006 ====
Liverpool City Council election, 4 May 2006: St Michael's
Party	Candidate	Votes	%	±%
Liberal Democrats	Peter Allen	1,112	41.5	▼8.1
Green	Jean Hill	675	25.2	▲8.8
Labour	Jack Johnson	670	25.0	▲1.1
Conservative	David Patmore	225	8.4	▼1.7
Majority		437	16.3	▼9.4
Registered electors		10,288		
Turnout			26.0	▼3.7
Liberal Democrats hold		Swing	▼4.7	

==== June 2004 ====
Liverpool City Council election, 10 June 2004: St Michael's
Party	Candidate	Votes	%	±%
Liberal Democrats	Elaine Allen (Note: Elected to serve a 4-year term.)	1,552	49.6	N/A
Liberal Democrats	John Coyne (Note: Elected to serve a 3-year term.)	1,537	–	–
Liberal Democrats	Peter Allen (Note: Elected to serve a 2-year term.)	1,484	–	–
Labour	Jack Johnson	750	23.9	N/A
Labour	Johnathan Reynolds	727	–	–
Labour	Peter Tuffley	708	–	–
Green	Jean Hill	514	16.4	N/A
Green	Johnathan Clatworthy	453	–	–
Green	Howard Jago	391	–	–
Conservative	Helen Hicklin	316	10.1	N/A
Conservative	David Patmore	280	–	–
Conservative	Elizabeth Morton	261	–	–
Majority		802	25.7	N/A
Registered electors		10,830		
Turnout			29.7	N/A
Liberal Democrats win (new seat)				
Liberal Democrats win (new seat)				
Liberal Democrats win (new seat)				

== Notes ==
• italics denote the sitting councillor • bold denotes the winning candidate
