= 2017 Liverpool City Region mayoral election =

2017 local election in England

- 4 May 2017
- Turnout: 26.1%
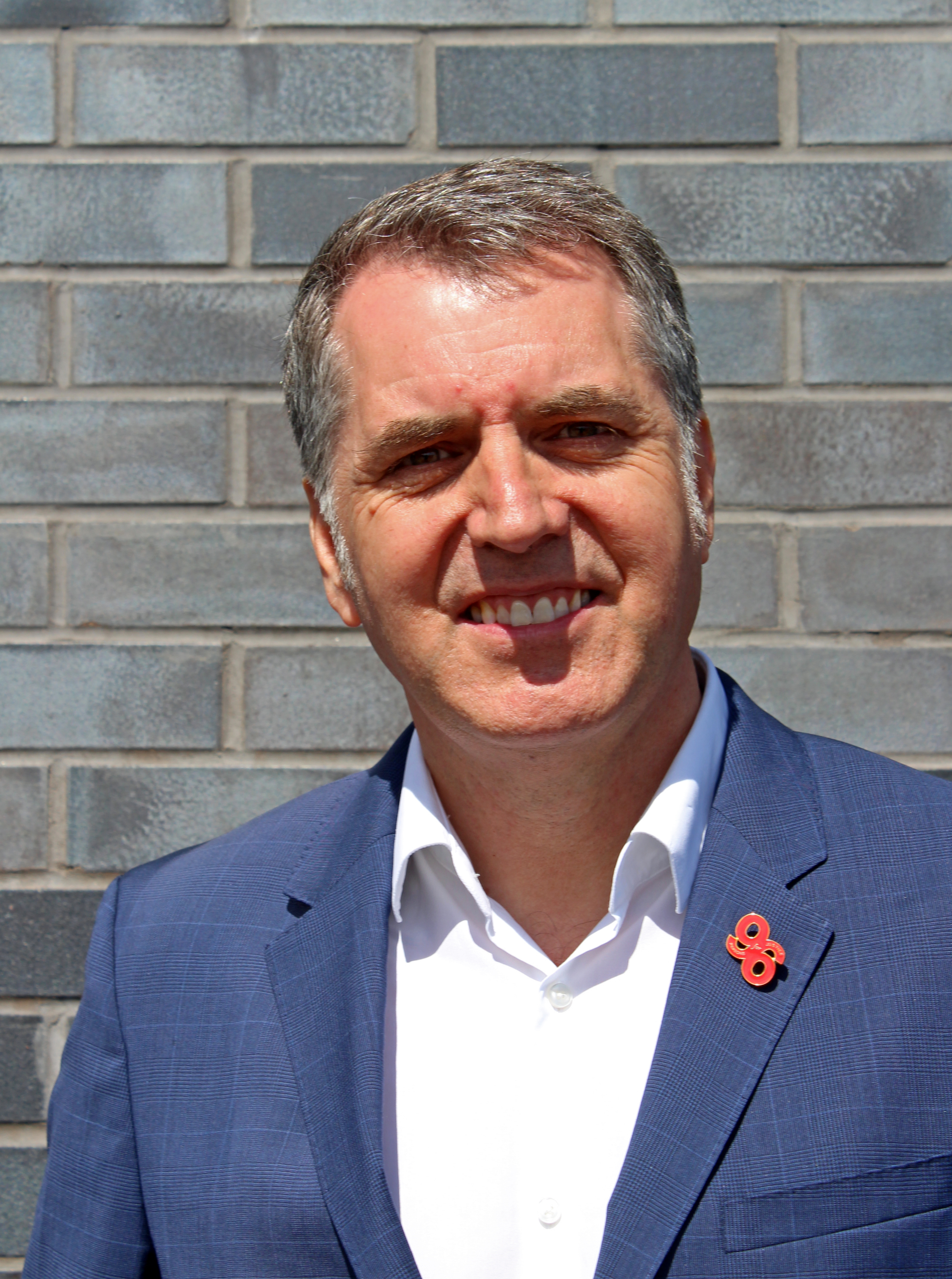
Candidate	Steve Rotheram	Tony Caldeira	Carl Cashman
Party	Labour	Conservative	Liberal Democrats
1st Round vote	171,167	58,805	19,751
Percentage	59.3%	20.4%	6.8%
- Election result by council areas
Mayor before election
Joe Anderson (interim)
Labour
Elected Mayor
Steve Rotheram
Labour

The 2017 Liverpool City Region mayoral election was held on 4 May 2017 to elect the Liverpool City Region Combined Authority and won by Steve Rotheram. Subsequent elections were planned for May 2020 but were postponed until May 2021 due to the covid pandemic with subsequent elections due every four years. The metro mayor will have control over the whole Liverpool City Region combined authority area which consists of the following local authorities:

- Halton
- Knowsley
- Liverpool
- St Helens
- Sefton
- Wirral

The mayor will work with existing city and borough leaders to take forward the mayor's strategic plan. The metro mayor will have a budget of £900 million over 30 years with powers on education & skills, planning and housing, transport, health and social care.

== Background ==
Combined authorities were introduced in England outside Greater London by the Local Democracy, Economic Development and Construction Act 2009 to cover areas larger than the existing local authorities but smaller than the regions. Combined authorities are created voluntarily and allow a group of local authorities to pool appropriate responsibility and receive certain delegated functions from central government in order to deliver transport and economic policy more effectively over a wider area. There are currently six such authorities, with the Greater Manchester Combined Authority established on 1 April 2011, Liverpool City Region Combined Authority and three others established in April 2014, and a sixth in April 2016. If only two candidates stand, then the election is conducted under the first past the post (FPTP) voting system, where the candidate with the most votes is elected. If there are three or more candidates, as in 2017, the outcome will be determined by the supplementary vote system (SV). Voters make both a first and second choice, with any candidate securing more than half of the first-preference vote being elected. If no candidate reaches this threshold, then all candidates except those in first and second place are eliminated. Second-preference votes from these candidates are transferred over, and whoever has the most votes is elected.

== Candidates ==
Conservative Party

Conservative candidate Tony Caldeira is a businessman and was candidate for Mayor of Liverpool in 2012 and 2016.

Caldeira's key policies were to:

- Improve transport networks
- Reduce planning processes
- Deliver faster economic growth
- Increase jobs and skills
- Prioritise brownfield sites over greenspace for the building of new homes and workplaces

Get The Coppers Off The Jury

Candidate Paul Breen previously ran as an Independent in the 2007 Liverpool City Council elections for Norris Green. No manifesto has been published with Breen stating that the party's name speaks for itself.

Green Party of England and Wales

Green Party candidate Tom Crone, Leader of the Green Group on Liverpool City Council and 2016 Liverpool mayoral candidate winning 11% of the vote.

Crone's key policies were to:

- Protect greenspaces by promoting development on brownfield sites
- Invest in training and education for jobs in the low carbon industry
- Prioritise a move to a low-carbon economy by supporting low carbon businesses and initiatives
- Tackle air pollution
- Invest in green energy and oppose fracking
- Invest in public transport, walking and cycling to reduce reliance upon cars
- Promote a move to non-diesel private and public transport
- Make more public land available to community-led housing projects
- Introduction of citizen forums
- Creation of an elected assembly to scrutinise the City Region mayor
- Commitment to gender, age and BAME balance in regional authority staffing

Labour Party

Labour candidate Steve Rotheram had been MP for Liverpool Walton since 2010, Parliamentary Private Secretary to the Leader of the Opposition since 2015, and former Lord Mayor of Liverpool.

Rotheram's key policies are to:

- Improve education
- Make brownfield sites more attractive to developers
- Cut the cost of Merseytravel's Fast Tag electronic pre-payment system

Liberal Democrats

Liberal Democrat candidate Councillor Carl Cashman is leader of the Liberal Democrat Group on Knowsley Council having been elected in 2016. At 25 years old he is the youngest of the candidates.

Cashman's key policies were to:

- Open a Liverpool City Region representative office in Brussels, Belgium.
- A Referendum on the terms the UK leaves the European Union, with the option to remain a member of the EU
- Make Merseytravel's Walrus card a reflection of London's Oyster card
- Remove tunnel tolls
- Protect greenspace
- Create a brownfield co-operative

Trade Unionist and Socialist Coalition (TUSC)

TUSC candidate Roger Bannister is a member the UNISON public services union, is secretary of a local UNISON Branch and a member of UNISON’s National Executive Council. He previous ran for mayor of Liverpool in the 2016 Liverpool mayoral elections receiving 5% of the votes.

Bannister's key policies were to:

- Oppose austerity
- Oppose cuts in public expenditure
- Adopt policies to revive the Liverpool City Region
- Support the rail guards
- Keep Liverpool Women’s Hospital open
- Reverse approval for new driver-only Merseyrail trains

UK Independence Party (UKIP)

UKIP candidate Paula Walters is a civil servant and chairwoman of UKIP Wirral. With no previous business experience she has previously campaigned against bridge and tunnel tolls.

Walters' key policies were to:

- Remove on bridge and tunnel tolls namely Runcorn Bridge, Queensway Tunnel and Kingsway Tunnel
- Ensure money is spent wisely
- Distribute money across the region fairly
- Listen to local residents
- Support small businesses
- Support young people

Women's Equality Party

The Women's Equality Party candidate Tabitha Morton is Head of Integration at lock manufacturer Yale.

Morton's key policies were to:

- Reduce domestic violence against women and girls
- Make sure women have a voice in important decisions
- Support women lead businesses to reduce the gender pay gap
- Set aside funds to train women in sectors where women are underrepresented

== Results ==
=== Overall election result ===
Liverpool City Region Mayoral Election, 2017
Party	Candidate	1st round		2nd round			1st round votesTransfer votes, 2nd round
Party	Candidate	Total	Of round	Transfers	Total	Of round	1st round votesTransfer votes, 2nd round
Labour	Steve Rotheram	171,167	59.3%				
Conservative	Tony Caldeira	58,805	20.4%				
Liberal Democrats	Carl Cashman	19,751	6.8%				
Green	Tom Crone	14,094	4.9%				
UKIP	Paula Walters	11,946	4.1%				
TUSC	Roger Bannister	7,881	2.7%				
Women's Equality	Tabitha Morton	4,287	1.5%				
Get The Coppers Off The Jury	Paul Breen	729	0.3%				
Majority					112,362	38.9%	
Turnout		286,339	26.1%				
Labour win							

=== Results by local authority ===
==== Halton ====
Liverpool City Region Mayoral Election, 2017 (Halton)
Party	Candidate	1st round		2nd round			1st round votesTransfer votes, 2nd round
Party	Candidate	Total	Of round	Transfers	Total	Of round	1st round votesTransfer votes, 2nd round
Labour	Steve Rotheram	11,636	60.6%				
Conservative	Tony Caldeira	3,928	20.5%				
UKIP	Paula Walters	1,191	6.2%				
Liberal Democrats	Carl Cashman	943	4.9%				
Green	Tom Crone	677	3.5%				
TUSC	Roger Bannister	503	2.6%				
Women's Equality	Tabitha Morton	245	1.3%				
Get The Coppers Off The Jury	Paul Breen	64	0.3%				
Majority					7,708	40.2%	
Turnout		19,492	20.5%				

==== Knowsley ====
Liverpool City Region Mayoral Election, 2017 (Knowsley)
Party	Candidate	1st round		2nd round			1st round votesTransfer votes, 2nd round
Party	Candidate	Total	Of round	Transfers	Total	Of round	1st round votesTransfer votes, 2nd round
Labour	Steve Rotheram	17,861	69.3%				
Conservative	Tony Caldeira	2,577	10.0%				
Liberal Democrats	Carl Cashman	2,385	9.3%				
TUSC	Roger Bannister	980	3.8%				
UKIP	Paula Walters	888	3.4%				
Green	Tom Crone	768	3.0%				
Women's Equality	Tabitha Morton	256	1.0%				
Get The Coppers Off The Jury	Paul Breen	61	0.2%				
Majority					15,284	59.3%	
Turnout		25,973	22.7%				

==== Liverpool ====
Liverpool City Region Mayoral Election, 2017 (Liverpool)
Party	Candidate	1st round		2nd round			1st round votesTransfer votes, 2nd round
Party	Candidate	Total	Of round	Transfers	Total	Of round	1st round votesTransfer votes, 2nd round
Labour	Steve Rotheram	63,241	69.6%				
Conservative	Tony Caldeira	9,409	10.3%				
Liberal Democrats	Carl Cashman	6,053	6.7%				
Green	Tom Crone	5,376	5.9%				
TUSC	Roger Bannister	2,729	3.0%				
UKIP	Paula Walters	2,298	2.5%				
Women's Equality	Tabitha Morton	1,541	1.7%				
Get The Coppers Off The Jury	Paul Breen	277	0.3%				
Majority					53,832	59.2%	
Turnout		91,697	28.6%				

==== Sefton ====
Liverpool City Region Mayoral Election, 2017 (Sefton)
Party	Candidate	1st round		2nd round			1st round votesTransfer votes, 2nd round
Party	Candidate	Total	Of round	Transfers	Total	Of round	1st round votesTransfer votes, 2nd round
Labour	Steve Rotheram	30,061	54.3%				
Conservative	Tony Caldeira	14,574	26.3%				
Liberal Democrats	Carl Cashman	4,152	7.5%				
Green	Tom Crone	2,323	4.2%				
UKIP	Paula Walters	2,064	3.7%				
TUSC	Roger Bannister	1,248	2.3%				
Women's Equality	Tabitha Morton	797	1.4%				
Get The Coppers Off The Jury	Paul Breen	138	0.2%				
Majority					15,487	28.0%	
Turnout		55,934	26.9%				

==== St Helens ====
Liverpool City Region Mayoral Election, 2017 (St Helens)
Party	Candidate	1st round		2nd round			1st round votesTransfer votes, 2nd round
Party	Candidate	Total	Of round	Transfers	Total	Of round	1st round votesTransfer votes, 2nd round
Labour	Steve Rotheram	15,643	50.2%				
Conservative	Tony Caldeira	8,293	26.6%				
Liberal Democrats	Carl Cashman	2,299	7.4%				
Green	Tom Crone	1,961	6.3%				
UKIP	Paula Walters	1,683	5.4%				
TUSC	Roger Bannister	786	2.5%				
Women's Equality	Tabitha Morton	443	1.4%				
Get The Coppers Off The Jury	Paul Breen	83	0.3%				
Majority					7,350	23.6%	
Turnout		31,462	22.9%				

==== Wirral ====
Liverpool City Region Mayoral Election, 2017 (Wirral)
Party	Candidate	1st round		2nd round			1st round votesTransfer votes, 2nd round
Party	Candidate	Total	Of round	Transfers	Total	Of round	1st round votesTransfer votes, 2nd round
Labour	Steve Rotheram	32,725	49.4%				
Conservative	Tony Caldeira	20,024	30.2%				
Liberal Democrats	Carl Cashman	3,919	5.9%				
UKIP	Paula Walters	3,822	5.8%				
Green	Tom Crone	2,989	4.5%				
TUSC	Roger Bannister	1,635	2.5%				
Women's Equality	Tabitha Morton	1,005	1.5%				
Get The Coppers Off The Jury	Paul Breen	106	0.2%				
Majority					12,701	19.2%	
Turnout		66,891	27.8%				
