= Runcorn Bridge =

Runcorn Bridge may refer to several bridges over the River Mersey and the Manchester Ship Canal in England:

- Mersey Gateway Bridge, a road bridge opened in 2017
- Runcorn Railway Bridge, a rail bridge opened in 1868
- Silver Jubilee Bridge or Runcorn–Widnes Bridge, a road bridge opened in 1961
- Widnes–Runcorn Transporter Bridge, opened in 1905 and demolished in 1961
