= Gillmoss (Liverpool ward) =

Former ward of Liverpool City Council (UK)

- Gillmoss ward (1980) within Liverpool
- Registered Electors: 13,555 (2003 election)
- Metropolitan borough: City of Liverpool
- Metropolitan county: Merseyside
- Region: North West
- Country: England
- Sovereign state: United Kingdom
- UK Parliament: Liverpool West Derby

Gillmoss ward was an electoral division of Liverpool City Council between 1953 and 2004. It and was centred on the Croxteth district of Liverpool.

== Background ==
The ward was first formed in 1953, its boundaries were changed in 1973 and 1980 before being dissolved in 2004.

=== 1953 boundaries ===
1953 boundaries

The ward was part of the Liverpool West Derby Parliamentary constituency.

=== 1973 election ===
1973 boundaries

Following the Local Government Act 1972 the ward boundaries of the council were altered. The number of wards was reduced from 40 to 33 and the aldermanic system was abolished. Gillmoss was retained and returned three councillors.

=== 1980 boundaries ===
A report of the Local Government Boundary Commission for England published in November 1978 set out proposals for changes to the wards of Liverpool City Council, maintaining the number of councillors at 99 representing 33 wards. Gillmoss ward was retained to be represented by three councillors.

The report describes the boundaries of Gillmoss ward as "Commencing at a point where Muirhead Avenue East meets Stalisfield Avenue, thence northwestwards along said Stalisfield Avenue to Dencourt Road, thence northeastwards along said road to Marcham Way, thence northwards along said way to Mentmore Crescent, thence northweatwards and northwards along said crescent to Marshfield Road, thence northeastwards along, said road to Eldersfield Road, thence northwestwards along said road and Whinhowe Road to Carr Lane, thence southwestwaafds along said lane to Sandway-Crescent (western access), thence generally northeastwards along said crescent to Carsington Road, thence northwards along said road to Utting Avenue East, thence northeastwards along said avenue to Lower House Lane, thence northwestwards along said lane to the southern boundary of Fazakerley Ward, thence northeastwards along said boundary and northwestwards along the eastern boundary of said ward to the northeastern boundary of the City, thence eastwards, northwards and generally southeastwards along said boundary to the access way to the southwest of the properties in the road known as Marled Hey, thence northwestwards along said access way to Waterpark Drive, thence southwestwards along said drive to NG ref SJ 4195093696, thence northwestwards in a straight line passing through NG ref SJ 4186993767 to the River Alt, thence continuing-northweotwards along said river to a point being the prolongation northeastwards of Oak Lane, thence southwestwards along said prolongation, said lane and Muirhead Avenue East to the point of commencement".

The ward was part of the Liverpool West Derby Parliamentary constituency.

=== 2004 election ===
A review by the Boundary Committee for England recommended that the council was formed of a reduced number of 90 members elected from 30 wards. Gillmoss ward was dissolved and distributed into the rearranged Croxteth ward, with small parts going into the re-arranged Fazakerley, the re-established West Derby ward and the new Norris Green and Yew Tree wards.

== Councillors ==
Election	Councillor	Councillor	Councillor
1973	J.J. Cruickshank (Lab)	T. Higgins (Lab)	Eddie Loyden (Lab)
1975	J.J. Cruickshank (Lab)	T. Higgins (Lab)	Eddie Loyden (Lab)
1976	J.J. Cruickshank (Lab)	William Snell (Lab)	Eddie Loyden (Lab)
1978	Peter Murphy (Lab)	William Snell (Lab)	Eddie Roderick (Lab)
1979	Peter Murphy (Lab)	William Snell (Lab)	Eddie Roderick (Lab)
WARD REFORMED
1980	William Snell (Lab)	Peter Murphy (Lab)	Eddie Roderick (Lab)
1982	William Snell (Lab)	Peter Murphy (Lab)	Eddie Roderick (Lab)
1983	William Snell (Lab)	Peter Murphy (Lab)	Eddie Roderick (Lab)
1984	William Snell (Lab)	Peter Murphy (Lab)	Tony Rimmer (Lab)
1986	Tony Jennings (Lab)	Peter Murphy (Lab)	Tony Rimmer (Lab)
1987	Tony Jennings (Lab)	Eddie Roderick (Lab)	Mary Roberts (Lab)
1988	Tony Jennings (Lab)	Eddie Roderick (Lab)	S Ledwich (Lab)
1990	Tony Jennings (Lab)	Eddie Roderick (Lab)	S Ledwich (Lab)
1991	Tony Jennings (Lab)	M. Alderson (Ind Lab)	S Ledwich (Lab)
1992	Tony Jennings (Lab)	M. Alderson (Ind Lab)	M. Black (Lab)
1994	Ken Stewart (Lab)	M. Alderson (Ind Lab)	M. Black (Lab)
1995	Ken Stewart (Lab)	W. Craig (Lab)	M. Black (Lab)
1996	Ken Stewart (Lab)	W. Craig (Lab)	Alf Flatery (Ind Lab)
1998	Rose Bailey (Lab)	W. Craig (Lab)	Alf Flatery (Ind Lab)
1999	Rose Bailey (Lab)	Pat Moloney (LD)	Alf Flatery (Ind Lab)
2000	Rose Bailey (Lab)	Pat Moloney (LD)	Pam Clein (LD)
2002	Rose Bailey (Lab)	Pat Moloney (LD)	Pam Clein (LD)
2003	Rose Bailey (Lab)	M Cummins (Lab)	Pam Clein (LD)

indicates seat up for re-election after boundary changes.

indicates seat up for re-election.

indicates change in affiliation.

indicates seat up for re-election after casual vacancy.

== Election results ==
=== Elections of the 2000s ===
Thursday 1 May 2003
Party	Candidate	Votes	%	±%
**Labour**	**Ms. M. Cummins**	**1,444**	**69.22**	**▲17.28**
Liberal Democrats	P. Maloney	418	20.04	▼18.22
Conservative	B. Jones	103	4.94	▲2.30
Liberal	Ms. F. Fall	83	3.98	▼0.99
Green	Ms. A. Graham	38	1.82	N/A
Majority		1,026	49.19	▲35.51
Turnout		2,086	15.39	▼10.80
Registered electors		13,555		
Labour **gain** from Liberal Democrats		Swing	+17.75	

Thursday 2 May 2002
Party	Candidate	Votes	%	±%
**Labour**	**Ms. R. Bailey**	**1,861**	**51.94**	**▲25.34**
Liberal Democrats	L. Sidorczuk	1,371	38.26	▼6.68
Liberal	Ms. F. Fall	178	4.97	▼0.51
Conservative	B. Jones	94	2.64	▼2.77
Socialist Labour	K. Anderson	79	2.20	N/A
Majority		490	13.68	▼4.66
Turnout		3,583	26.19	▲9.00
Registered electors		13,679		
Labour **hold**		Swing	+16.01	

Thursday 4 May 2000
Party	Candidate	Votes	%	±%
**Liberal Democrats**	**Ms. P. Clein**	**1,083**	**44.94**	**▼5.13**
Labour	Ms. N. Stewart	641	26.60	▼1.47
Independent Labour	Ms. J. Jones	424	17.59	N/A
Liberal	G. Booth	132	5.48	▼1.52
Conservative	B. Jones	130	5.39	▲3.24
Majority		442	18.34	▼3.66
Turnout		2,410	17.19	▼3.69
Registered electors		14,018		
Liberal Democrats **gain** from Independent Labour		Swing		

=== Elections of the 1990s ===
Thursday 6 May 1999
Party	Candidate	Votes	%	±%
**Liberal Democrats**	**P. Moloney**	**1,445**	**50.07**	**▲29.00**
Labour	J. Murphy	810	28.07	▲2.41
Independent	J. White	367	12.72	N/A
Liberal	Ms. F. Fall	202	7.00	▼14.93
Conservative	B. Jones	62	2.15	▼1.35
Majority		635	22.00	▲19.71
Turnout		2,886	20.88	▲1.47
Registered electors		13,825		
Liberal Democrats **gain** from Labour		Swing	+13.30	

Thursday 7 May 1998
Party	Candidate	Votes	%	±%
**Labour**	**Ms. M. Bailey**	**682**	**25.66**	**▼8.60**
Independent Labour	C. Morgan	621	23.36	▼14.90
Liberal	Ms. F. Fall	583	21.93	▲10.88
Liberal Democrats	S. Monkcom	560	21.07	▲9.75
Independent	E. Burke	119	4.48	N/A
Conservative	B. Jones	93	3.50	▼1.61
Majority		61	2.29	▼1.72
Turnout		2,658	19.41	▼4.05
Registered electors		13,691		
Labour **hold**		Swing	+3.15	

Thursday 2 May 1996
Party	Candidate	Votes	%	±%
**Independent Labour**	**A. Flattery**	**1,146**	**38.26**	**▲2.19**
Labour	M. Black	1,026	34.26	▼9.49
Liberal Democrats	Ms. H. Owen	339	11.32	▲2.28
Liberal	Ms. F. Fall	331	11.05	▲5.02
Conservative	B. Jones	153	5.11	▲1.54
Majority		120	4.01	▼3.67
Turnout		2,995	23.46	▼4.15
Registered electors		12,769		
Independent Labour **gain** from Labour		Swing	+5.84	

Thursday 4 May 1995
Party	Candidate	Votes	%	±%
**Labour**	**W. Craig**	**1,481**	**43.75**	**▼2.80**
Independent Labour	M. Alderson	1,221	36.07	▲4.70
Liberal Democrats	Ms. H. Owen	306	9.04	▼6.81
Liberal	Ms. F. Fall	204	6.03	N/A
Conservative	B. Jones	121	3.57	▼0.74
Green	Ms A. Graham	52	1.54	▼0.38
Majority		260	7.68	▼7.50
Turnout		3,385	27.61	▼8.99
Registered electors		12,258		
Labour **gain** from Independent Labour		Swing	-3.75	

Thursday 5 May 1994
Party	Candidate	Votes	%	±%
**Labour**	**K. Stewart**	**2,064**	**46.55**	**▲1.77**
Independent Labour	A. Jennings	1,391	31.37	▼0.77
Liberal Democrats	G. Mann	703	15.85	▲2.05
Conservative	B. Jones	191	4.31	▼6.50
Green	Ms A. Graham	85	1.92	N/A
Majority		673	15.18	▲1.00
Turnout		4,434	36.60	▲10.39
Registered electors		12,115		
Labour **hold**		Swing	+0.50	

Thursday 7 May 1992
Party	Candidate	Votes	%	±%
**Labour**	**M. Black**	**1,317**	**44.78**	**▲17.24**
Independent Labour	S. Ledwich	900	30.60	▼17.94
Liberal Democrats	G. Mann	406	13.80	▼0.65
Conservative	Ms. A. Bowness	318	10.81	▲3.99
Majority		417	14.18	▼6.81
Turnout		2,941	26.21	▼16.08
Registered electors		11,223		
Labour **hold**		Swing	+17.59	

Thursday 2 May 1991
Party	Candidate	Votes	%	±%
**Independent Labour**	**M. Alderson**	**2,127**	**48.54**	**N/A**
Labour	E. Roderick	1,207	27.54	▼50.76
Liberal Democrats	G. Mann	633	14.45	▲2.61
Conservative	Ms. A. Bowness	299	6.82	▲1.08
Green	Ms. S. Ellison	116	2.65	▼1.47
Majority		920	20.99	▼45.47
Turnout		4,382	42.29	▼0.59
Registered electors		10,361		
Independent Labour **gain** from Labour		Swing	+49.65	

Thursday 3 May 1990
Party	Candidate	Votes	%	±%
**Labour**	**A. Jennings**	**3,479**	**78.30**	**▼1.34**
SLD	G. Mann	526	11.84	▲3.43
Conservative	S. North	255	5.74	▼3.68
Green	Ms. S. Ellison	183	4.12	▲1.59
Majority		2,953	66.46	▼3.76
Turnout		4,443	42.88	▲5.80
Registered electors		10,361		
Labour **hold**		Swing	-2.38	

=== Elections of the 1980s ===
Thursday 5 May 1988
Party	Candidate	Votes	%	±%
**Labour**	**S. Ledwich**	**3,239**	**79.64**	**▲8.24**
Conservative	S. North	383	9.42	▲0.52
SLD	C. Leahy	342	8.41	▼11.39
Green	Ms. S. Ellison	103	2.53	N/A
Majority		2,856	70.22	▲18.52
Turnout		4,067	37.08	▼2.82
Registered electors		10,968		
Labour **hold**		Swing	+3.86	

Thursday 7 May 1987 (Note: Tony Rimmer was surcharged and banned from office following the Rate-capping rebellion. Two seats were contested at the 1987 election.)
Party	Candidate	Votes	%	±%
**Labour**	**E. Roderick**	**3,288**	**71.4**	
**Labour**	**Ms. M. Roberts**	**3,174**		
Alliance	E. Boult	910	19.8	
Alliance	J. Thomson	807		
Conservative	G. Barker	409	8.9	
Conservative	S. North	347		▼
Majority		2,378	51.70	▼0.24
Turnout			39.9	▲
Registered electors		11,205		
Labour **hold**		Swing		

Thursday 8 May 1986
Party	Candidate	Votes	%	±%
**Labour**	**A. Jennings**	**2,748**	**71.12**	**▼6.22**
Alliance	E. Boult	741	19.18	▲9.30
Conservative	P. Hinks	375	9.70	▼3.10
Majority		2,007	51.94	▼12.62
Turnout		3,864	33.83	▼7.76
Registered electors		11,421		
Labour **hold**		Swing	-7.76	

Thursday 3 May 1984
Party	Candidate	Votes	%	±%
**Labour**	**A. Rimmer**	**3,836**	**77.34**	**▲2.39**
Conservative	P. Ferris	634	12.80	▼0.02
Alliance	B. Coleman	490	9.88	▼2.37
Majority		3,202	64.56	▲2.41
Turnout		4,960	41.59	▲9.16
Registered electors		11,927		
Labour **hold**		Swing	+1.20	

Thursday 5 May 1983
Party	Candidate	Votes	%	±%
**Labour**	**P. Murphy**	**2,887**	**74.95**	**▲11.56**
Conservative	A. Gore	493	12.80	▼1.67
Alliance	P. Kellett	472	12.25	▼9.90
Majority		2,394	62.15	▲20.91
Turnout		3,852	32.43	▲4.23
Registered electors		11,878		
Labour **hold**		Swing	+6.61	

Thursday 6 May 1982
Party	Candidate	Votes	%	±%
**Labour**	**W. Snell**	**2,138**	**63.39**	**▼12.29**
Alliance	P. Kellett	747	22.15	▲13.65
Conservative	J. Mangan	488	14.47	▼1.35
Majority		1,391	41.24	▼18.61
Turnout		3,373	28.20	▲4.24
Registered electors		11,962		
Labour **hold**		Swing	-12.97	

Thursday 1 May 1980
Party	Candidate	Votes	%	±%
**Labour**	**E. Roderick**	**2,181**	**75.68**	
**Labour**	**P. Murphy**	**2,112**	**73.28**	
**Labour**	**W. Snell**	**1,978**	**68.63**	
Conservative	Phippard	456	15.82	
Conservative	Ms. P. Dougherty	434	15.06	
Conservative	W. Brown	413	14.33	
Liberal	Ms. J. Jones	245	8.50	
Liberal	Ms. M. Bridge	234	8.12	
Liberal	Ms. A. Loughney	199	6.90	
Majority		1,725	59.85	
Turnout		2,882	23.96	
Registered electors		12,029		
Labour **win** (new seat)				
Labour **win** (new seat)				
Labour **win** (new seat)				

=== Elections of the 1970s ===
Thursday 3 May 1979
Party	Candidate	Votes	%	±%
**Labour**	**P. Murphy**	**7,702**	**66.08**	**▲9.90**
Conservative	A. Gore	2,647	22.71	▼2.65
Liberal	T. Sawney	1,306	11.21	▼7.25
Majority		5,055	43.37	▲12.55
Turnout		11,655	62.26	▲38.64
Registered electors		18,720		
Labour **hold**		Swing	+6.28	

Thursday 4 May 1978
Party	Candidate	Votes	%	±%
**Labour**	**E. Roderick**	**2,554**	**56.18**	**▼1.97**
**Labour**	**P. Murphy**	**2,372**	**52.18**	
Conservative	A. Gore	1,153	25.36	▲1.21
Conservative	F. Kennedy	1,107	24.35	
Liberal	E. Carroll	839	18.46	▲0.76
Liberal	J. Palfreyman	833	18.32	
Majority		1,401	30.82	▼3.18
Turnout		4,546	23.62	▲3.07
Registered electors		19,245		
Labour **hold**		Swing	+2.00	
Labour **hold**		Swing		

Thursday 6 May 1976
Party	Candidate	Votes	%	±%
**Labour**	**W. Snell**	**2,309**	**58.15**	**▲0.01**
Conservative	B. Dougherty	959	24.15	▲0.25
Liberal	J. Morgan	703	17.70	▼0.27
Majority		1,350	34.00	▼0.24
Turnout		3,971	20.55	▲6.34
Registered electors		19,326		
Labour **hold**		Swing	-0.12	

Thursday 1 May 1975
Party	Candidate	Votes	%	±%
**Labour**	**J.J. Cruickshank**	**1,618**	**58.14**	**▼10.98**
Conservative	Williams	665	23.90	▼0.91
Liberal	Stocker	500	17.97	N/A
Majority		953	34.24	▼10.07
Turnout		2,783	14.21	▼2.04
Registered electors		19,586		
Labour **hold**		Swing	-5.03	

Thursday 10 May 1973
Party	Candidate	Votes	%	±%
**Labour**	**E. Loyden**	**2,254**	**69.12**	
**Labour**	**Higgins**	**2,170**	**66.54**	
**Labour**	**J.J. Cruickshank**	**2,139**	**65.59**	
Conservative	Phippard	809	24.81	
Conservative	B. Dougherty	773	23.70	
Conservative	Henri	710	21.77	
Majority		1,445	44.31	
Turnout		3,261	16.25	
Registered electors		20,068		
Labour **win** (new seat)				
Labour **win** (new seat)				
Labour **win** (new seat)				

=== Notes ===
• italics - Denotes the sitting Councillor.
•bold - Denotes the winning candidate.

== See also ==
- Liverpool City Council
- Liverpool City Council elections 1880–present
- Liverpool Town Council elections 1835 - 1879
