= Clubmoor (ward) =

Metropolitan borough council ward in Liverpool, England

Coordinates: 53.441°N 2.9235°W

- Clubmoor ward within Liverpool
- Area: 2.796 km^{2} (1.080 sq mi)
- Population: 15,894 (2021 census)
  - Density: 5,685/km^{2} (14,720/sq mi)
- Registered Electors: 11,248 (2021 by-election)
- Metropolitan borough: City of Liverpool
- Metropolitan county: Merseyside
- Region: North West
- Country: England
- Sovereign state: United Kingdom
- UK Parliament: Liverpool Walton

Clubmoor ward was an electoral division of Liverpool City Council in the Liverpool Walton Parliamentary constituency.

== Background ==
The ward was formed in 1953 and its boundaries were altered in 1973, 1980 and 2004 before being dissolved in 2023.

=== 1980 boundaries ===
1980 ward boundaries

A report of the Local Government Boundary Commission for England published in November 1978 set out proposals for changes to the wards of Liverpool City Council, maintaining the number of councillors at 99 representing 33 wards. Croxteth ward was represented by three councillors.

The report describes the boundaries as "Commencing at a point where Muirhead Avenue meets Delamain Road, thence northwestwards along said road and Lisburn Lane to Finvoy Road, thence southwestwards along said road crossing Glengariff Street to the southeastern boundary of number 43 Glengariff Street, thence continuing southwestwards along said boundary and in prolongation thereof to the eastern boundary of the Marlborough Allotment Gardens, thence southeastward along said boundary, southwestwards along the southern boundary of said allotment gardens and in prolongation thereof to the Liverpool Exchange - Broad Green railway thence northwestwards along said railway to Morella Road, thence northeastwards along said road to Cherry Lane, thence southeastwards along said lane to Richard Kelly Drive, thence northwards along said drive to the southern boundary of Pirrie Ward, thence northeastwards along said boundary to the western boundary of Gillmoss Ward, thence generally southeastwards along said boundary to Muirhead Avenue East, thence south-westwards along said avenue and Muirhead Avenue to the point of commencement".

=== 2004 boundaries ===
2004 ward boundaries

A review by the Boundary Committee for England recommended that the council was formed of a reduced number of 90 members elected from 30 wards.

The new ward was formed from the western half of the former Clubmoor ward, the eastern portion of the former County ward, and the southwestern corner of Pirrie ward.

The ward boundaries followed Walton Hall Avenue, the western property boundary of Torrisholme Road, behind Pirrie Road, Stopgate Lane, Parthenon Drive, Lorenzo Drive, Muirhead Avenue, Delamain Road, Maiden Lane, the southeastern property boundary of Worcester Drive, Pennsylvania Road, the Canada Dock Branch Line, and Stanley Park Avenue North.

The population of the ward at the 2011 census was 15,272, The ward boundary was changed at the 2004 municipal elections. and at the 2021 Census was 15,894.

The ward was dissolved at the 2023 elections where it was distributed into the new Clubmoor West, Clubmoor East, Tuebrook Larkhill, and Norris Green wards, and a small part of the Walton ward.

== Councillors ==
Election	Councillor	Councillor	Councillor
1973	Mike Storey (Lib)	Charles Simmons (Lib)	John Bowen (Lib)
1975	Mike Storey (Lib)	C Simmons (Lib)	John Bowen (Lib)
1976	Mike Storey (Lib)	Angela Warburton (Lib)	John Bowen (Lib)
1978	Mike Storey (Lib)	Angela Warburton (Lib)	Alexander Gamble (Lab)
1979	Mike Storey (Lib)	Angela Warburton (Lib)	Alexander Gamble (Lab)
WARD REFORMED
1980	Mike Storey (Lib)	Angela Warburton (Lib)	John Bowen (Lib)
1982	Mike Storey (Lib)	Angela Warburton (Lib)	Roy Gladden (Lab)
1983	Mike Storey (Lib)	Paul Lafferty (Lab)	Roy Gladden (Lab)
1984	William Lafferty (Lab)	Paul Lafferty (Lab)	Roy Gladden (Lab)
1986	W Lafferty (Lab)	Paul Lafferty (Lab)	Roy Gladden (Lab)
1987^{[a]}	W Lafferty (Lab)	T McManus (Lab)	K Noon (Lab)
1988	Keva Coombes (Lab)	T McManus (Lab)	K Noon (Lab)
1990	Keva Coombes (Lab)	T McManus (Lab)	K Noon (Lab)
1991	Keva Coombes (Lab)	M Richardson (Lab)	K Noon (Lab)
1992	Steve Ellison (Lab)	M Richardson (Lab)	K Noon (Lab)
1994	Steve Ellison (Lab)	P Harvey (Lab)^{[b]}	Joe Kenny (Lab)
1995	Steve Ellison (Lab)	George Smith (Lab)	Joe Kenny (Lab)
1996	Steve Ellison (Lab)	George Smith (Lab)	Joe Kenny (Lab)
1998	Steve Ellison (Lab)	George Smith (Lab)	Paul Woodruff (Lib)
1999	Steve Ellison (Lab)	George Smith (Lib)	Paul Woodruff (Lib)
2000	Irene Smith (Lib)	George Smith (Lib)	Paul Woodruff (Lib)
2002	Irene Smith (Lib)	George Smith (Lib)	Ben Williams (Lab)
2003	Irene Smith (Lib)	Roz Gladden (Lab)	Ben Williams (Lab)
WARD REFORMED
2004	Roz Gladden (Lab)	Irene Rainey (Lab)	Ben Williams (Lab)
2006	Roz Gladden (Lab)	Irene Rainey (Lab)	Ben Williams (Lab)
2007	Roz Gladden (Lab)	Irene Rainey (Lab)	Ben Williams (Lab)
2008	Roz Gladden (Lab)	Irene Rainey (Lab)	James Noakes (Lab)
2010	Roz Gladden (Lab)	Irene Rainey (Lab)	James Noakes (Lab)
2011	Roz Gladden (Lab)	Irene Rainey (Lab)	James Noakes (Lab)
2012	Roz Gladden (Lab)	Irene Rainey (Lab)	James Noakes (Lab)
2014	Roz Gladden (Lab)	Irene Rainey (Lab)	James Noakes (Lab)
2015	Roz Gladden (Lab)	Irene Rainey (Lab)	James Noakes (Lab)
2016	Roz Gladden (Lab)	Irene Rainey (Lab)	James Noakes (Lab)
2018	Roz Gladden (Lab)	Irene Rainey (Lab)	James Noakes (Lab)
2019	Roz Gladden (Lab)	Sarah Morton (Lab)	Tim Jeeves (Lab)^{[c]}
2021	Roz Gladden (Lab)	Sarah Morton (Ind)^{[e]}	Tim Jeeves (Lab)
2021	Roz Gladden (Lab)	Sarah Morton (Ind)^{[e]}	Matthew Smyth (Lab)^{[d]}

indicates seat up for re-election after boundary changes.

indicates seat up for re-election.

indicates change in affiliation.

indicates seat up for re-election after casual vacancy.

=== Notes ===
a. Cllr Roy Gladden (Labour, 1986) and Cllr Paul Lafferty (Labour, 1983) were surcharged and banned from office following the Rate-capping rebellion. Two seats were contested at the 1987 election.

b.A by-election was held in 1994.

c.Cllr James Noakes (Labour, 2008) resigned in 2019.

d.Cllr Tim Jeeves (Labour, 2019) died on 9 September 2021 after successfully defending his seat in the May elections.

e.Cllr Sarah Morton (Labour, 2019) was suspended by the Labour Party in April 2021 following a series of outbursts on social media, and resigned from the Labour Party to sit as an independent in November 2021.

== Election results ==
=== Elections of the 2020s ===
2021 Clubmoor By-election: 18 November 2021
Party	Candidate	Votes	%	±%
**Labour**	**Matthew James Smyth**	**787**	**54.50%**	**▼7.65**
Liberal	Liam James Buckley	324	22.44	▲3.19
Independent	Laura-Jayne Wharton	167	11.57	Steady
TUSC	Ann Barbara Walsh	54	3.74	Steady
Green	Peter Andrew Cranie	45	3.12	▼4.69
Liberal Democrats	Steve Fitzsimmons	34	2.35	▼3.20
Conservative	Wendy Hine	33	2.29	▼2.96
Majority		463	32.06	▼10.84
Turnout		1,448	12.87	▼11.31
Registered electors		11,248		
Rejected ballots		4	0.28	▼2.29
Labour **hold**		Swing	-5.42	

Liverpool City Council Municipal Elections 2021: 6th May 2021
Party	Candidate	Votes	%	±%
**Labour**	**Tim Jeeves**	**1,647**	**62.15%**	**▼21.21**
Liberal	Liam James Buckley	510	19.25%	▲13.47
Green	Michael Christopher Stretton	207	7.81%	▲3.30
Liberal Democrats	Sean Robertson	147	5.55%	▲2.21
Conservative	Alice Margaret Day	139	5.25%	Steady
Majority		1,137	42.90%	▼37.68
Turnout		2,650	24.18%	▼41.61
Registered electors		11,250		
Rejected ballots		70	2.57%	▲0.68
Labour **hold**		Swing	-3.87	

=== Elections of the 2010s ===
Clubmoor by-election 2019, 12th December 2019
Party	Candidate	Votes	%	±%
**Labour**	**Tim Jeeves**	**6,276**	**86.36%**	**▲12.12**
Liberal	Paul Wynne Jones	420	5.78%	▼2.74
Green	Michael Christopher Stretton	328	4.51%	▼3.67
Liberal Democrats	Stephen Fitzsimmons	243	3.34%	▼1.61
Majority		5,856	80.58%	▲14.85%
Turnout		7,407	65.79%	▲44.07
Registered electors		11,258		
Rejected ballots		140	1.89%	▲0.57
Labour **hold**		Swing	7.43	

Liverpool City Council Municipal Elections 2019: 2nd May 2019
Party	Candidate	Votes	%	±%
**Labour**	**Sarah Jane Morton**	**1,770**	**74.24%**	**▼8.84**
Liberal	Paul Wynne Jones	203	8.52%	▲3.50
Green	Helen Alexandra Parker-Jervis	195	8.18%	▲4.13
Liberal Democrats	Sean Robertson	118	4.95%	▲2.03
Conservative	Peter Andrew	98	4.11%	▼0.83
Majority		1,567	65.73%	▼12.33
Turnout		2,416	21.72%	▼1.25
Registered electors		11,121		
Rejected ballots		32	1.32%	▲0.86
Labour **hold**		Swing	-6.17%	

Liverpool City Council Municipal Elections 2018: 3rd May 2018
Party	Candidate	Votes	%	±%
Labour	**Roz Gladden**	2,136	83.08%	▲9.73
Liberal	Paul Wynne Jones	129	5.02%	▼2.20
Conservative	Peter Andrew	127	4.94%	▲1.22
Green	Esther Ruth Cosslett	104	4.05%	▼4.59
Liberal Democrats	Paul Phillip Childs	75	2.92%	▼4.30
Majority		2,007	78.06%	▲13.35
Turnout		2,583	22.97%	▼3.59
Registered electors		11,243		
Rejected ballots		12	0.46%	
Labour **hold**		Swing	5.97%	

Liverpool City Council Municipal Elections 2016: 5th May 2016
Party	Candidate	Votes	%	±%
Labour	**James Noakes**	2,072	73.35%	−4.83%
Green	James Alexander Melia-Jones	244	8.64%	+4.94%
Liberal Democrats	Paula Keaveney	204	7.22%	+4.99%
Liberal	Paul Wynne Jones	204	7.22%	+4.07%
Conservative	Derek Thomas Nuttall	105	3.72%	+1.10%
Majority		1,828	64.71%	−3.35%
Registered electors		10,871		
Turnout		2,887	26.56%	−36.89%
Labour **hold**		Swing	-4.89%	

Liverpool City Council Municipal Elections 2015: 7th May 2015
Party	Candidate	Votes	%	±%
Labour	**Irene Rainey**	5,493	78.18%	+9.59%
UKIP	John Sisson	711	10.12%	−11.26%
Green	Oba Babs-Osibodu	260	3.70%	+0.05%
Liberal	Paul Wynne Jones	221	3.15%	−0.90%
Conservative	Emilio Antonio Chiquito	184	2.62%	+0.28%
Liberal Democrats	Christopher James Latimer	157	2.23%	n/a
Majority		4,782	68.06%	+21.15%
Registered electors		11,116		
Turnout		7,053	63.45%	+34.59%
Labour **hold**		Swing	10.43%	

Liverpool City Council Municipal Elections 2014: 22nd May 2014
Party	Candidate	Votes	%	±%
Labour	**Roz Gladden**	2,201	68.59%	−9.31%
UKIP	Paul Forrest	686	21.38%	+14.91%
Liberal	Paul Wynne Jones	130	4.05%	+0.32%
Green	Elspeth Anwar	117	3.65%	+1.40%
Conservative	Beryl Pinnington	75	2.34%	−0.10%
Majority		1,515	46.91%	−24.52%
Turnout		3,209	28.86%	−1.74%
Labour **hold**		Swing	-12.11%	

Liverpool City Council Municipal Elections 2012: 3rd May 2012
Party	Candidate	Votes	%	±%
Labour	**James Noakes**	2,587	77.90%	−2.52%
UKIP	Paul Ian James Forrest	215	6.47%	n/a
Liberal	James Denis Gaskell	124	3.73%	−0.87%
Liberal Democrats	Francis Stanley Roderick	106	3.19%	−3.23%
Green	Tony Jones	64	2.25%	−1.21%
TUSC	Alison Louise Nelson	97	2.92%	n/a
Conservative	George Powell	81	2.44%	−2.66%
British Freedom	Andrew Edward Philip Harvey	26	0.78%	n/a
Majority		2,372	71.43%	−2.57%
Turnout		2,849	30.60%	−2.5.%
Labour **hold**		Swing	-4.50%	

Liverpool City Council Municipal Elections 2011: 5th May 2011
Party	Candidate	Votes	%	±%
Labour	**Irene Rainey**	**2904**	**80.42%**	+10.96%
Liberal Democrats	Michelle Keeley	232	6.42%	n/a
Conservative	George Powell	184	5.10%	+0.5%
Liberal	James Dennis Gaskell	166	4.60%	−12.96%
Green	William Major	125	3.46%	+1.04%
Majority		2672	74.00%	+22.09%
Turnout		3611	33.10%	−19.50%
Labour **hold**		Swing	11.96%	

Liverpool City Council Municipal Elections 2010: Clubmoor
Party	Candidate	Votes	%	±%
Labour	**Roz Gladden**	**4245**	**69.46%**	
Liberal	David Maher	1073	17.56%	
BNP	Peter Squire	364	5.96%	
Conservative	Victoria McDonald	281	4.60%	
Green	Mark Bacon	148	2.42%	
Majority		3172	51.91%	
Turnout		6111	52.60%	
Labour **hold**		Swing		

=== Elections of the 2000s ===
Liverpool City Council Municipal Elections 2008: Clubmoor
Party	Candidate	Votes	%	±%
Labour	**Jim Noakes**	**1341**	**48.00%**	
Liberal	Dennis Gaskell	859	30.74%	
BNP	Peter Squire	358	12.81%	
Conservative	Gwynneth May Hicklin	150	5.37%	
Green	Eleanor Edith Pontin	68	2.43%	
Independent	Maggie Stewart	18	0.64%	
Majority				
Turnout		2794	24.77%	
Labour **hold**		Swing		

Liverpool City Council Municipal Elections 2007: Clubmoor
Party	Candidate	Votes	%	±%
Labour	**Irene Rainey**	**1366**	**48.42%**	
Liberal	David Maher	999	35.41%	
BNP	Peter Squire	210	7.44%	
Conservative	Gwynneth May Hicklin	147	5.21%	
Green	Jonathan Mercer	99	3.51%	
Majority				
Turnout		2821	25.01%	
Labour **hold**		Swing		

Liverpool City Council Municipal Elections 2006: Clubmoor
Party	Candidate	Votes	%	±%
Labour	**Roz Gladden**	**1440**	**48.58%**	
Liberal	David Maher	791	26.69%	
Liberal Democrats	James Denis Gaskell	410	13.83%	
Conservative	Gwynneth May Hicklin	132	4.45%	
Green	Andrew Peter Hoban	120	4.05%	
Socialist Labour	Kai Andersen	71	2.40%	
Majority				
Turnout		2964	25.13%	
Labour **hold**		Swing		

After the boundary change of 2004 the whole of Liverpool City Council faced election. Three Councillors were returned.

Liverpool City Council Municipal Elections 2004: Clubmoor
Party	Candidate	Votes	%	±%
Labour	**Benjamin Williams**	**1844**		
Labour	**Irene Rainey**	**1626**		
Labour	**Rochne Gladden**	**1624**		
Liberal Democrats	Irene Smith	1542		
Liberal Democrats	Ann Kendrick	1445		
Liberal Democrats	Joanne Connolly	1230		
Liberal	Deborah Tilston	466		
Liberal	Frances Fall	432		
Liberal	Michael Williams	377		
Socialist Alliance	Gary Theys	72		
Majority				
Turnout		4045	34.35%	
Labour **hold**		Swing	n/a	

• italics denotes the sitting Councillor • bold denotes the winning candidate
