= 2003 Liverpool City Council election =

2003 UK local government election

- 1 May 2003

34 seats were up for election (one third): one seat for each of the 33 wards plus one by-election 50 seats needed for a majority

Elections to Liverpool City Council were held on 1 May 2003. One third of the council was up for election plus one by-election, and the Liberal Democrat party kept overall control of the council. Overall turnout was 21.7%.

After the election, the composition of the council was

Party	Seats	±
Liberal Democrats	63	
Labour	31	
Liberal	3	0
Independent	2	

== Election result ==
Liverpool local election result 2003
Party	Seats	Gains	Losses	Net gain/loss	Seats %	Votes %	Votes	+/−
Liberal Democrats	22			-2	64.7	49.8	37,194	-0.5
Labour	11			+4	29.4	34.2	25,514	-1.2
Liberal	1			+1	2.9	6.8	5,066	+1.3
Liverpool Labour Community Party	1			-1	2.9	1.4	1,034	+1.4
Conservative	0			0	0.0	4.1	3,050	-0.1
Green	0			0	0.0	2.8	2,093	+0.8
Socialist Alliance	0			0	0.0	0.6	461	+0.2
BNP	0			0	0.0	0.3	242	+0.1
Independent	0			-2	0.0	0.0	0	-1.7

== Ward results ==
=== Abercromby ===
Abercromby
Party	Candidate	Votes	%	±%
Labour	Paul Brant *	953	61.3%	−4.5%
Liberal Democrats	Linda-Jane Buckle	288	18.5	+3.2
Green	Peter Cranie	230	14.8	+4.0
Conservative	John Creagh	55	3.5	−1.3
Liberal	Arthur Carroll	29	1.9	−1.4
Majority		665		
Registered electors				
Turnout				
Rejected ballots				
Labour hold		Swing		

=== Aigburth ===
Aigburth
Party	Candidate	Votes	%	±%
Liberal Democrats	David Antrobus *	1,394	47.3%	−3.4%
Labour	Barbara Murray	654	22.2	−4.9
Liberal	Catherine Hancox	315	10.7	+10.7
Green	Alexander Rudkin	239	8.1	−0.1
Conservative	Michael Bunter	235	8.0	+0.0
Socialist Alliance	Mark Henzel	111	3.8	+3.8
Majority		740	25.1	+1.5
Registered electors				
Turnout		2,948	21.1	
Rejected ballots				
Liberal Democrats hold		Swing		

=== Allerton ===
Allerton
Party	Candidate	Votes	%	±%
Liberal Democrats	Veronica Best *	1,599	52.3%	−2.9%
Labour	Laurence Freeman	603	19.7	+0.4
Conservative	Mark Bill	536	17.5	+3.1
Liberal	Christopher Hulme	185	6.1	−2.0
Green	Andrew Hoban	134	4.4	+1.4
Majority		996	32.6	−3.3
Registered electors				
Turnout		3,057	25.2	
Rejected ballots				
Liberal Democrats hold		Swing		

=== Anfield ===
Anfield
Party	Candidate	Votes	%	±%
Liberal Democrats	Robert Quinn	1,162	47.0%	−8.5%
Liberal	Michael Butler	666	27.0	+27.0
Labour	Sheila Murphy	416	16.8	−8.1
BNP	Joseph Owens	150	6.1	+6.1
Socialist Alliance	Lesley Mahmood	47	1.9	+0.0
Conservative	Alistair Furze	30	1.2	+1.2
Majority		496	20.0	−10.6
Registered electors				
Turnout		2,471	24.4	
Rejected ballots				
Liberal Democrats hold		Swing		

=== Arundel ===
Arundel
Party	Candidate	Votes	%	±%
Liberal Democrats	Mirna Juarez *	1,141	61.2%	+7.5%
Labour	Anthony Murphy	401	21.5	−7.9
Green	Donald Ross	144	7.7	+0.1
Socialist Alliance	Ian Foulkes	125	6.7	+1.0
Conservative	Ann Nugent	53	2.8	−0.6
Majority		740	39.7	+15.4
Registered electors				
Turnout		1,864	16.7	
Rejected ballots				
Liberal Democrats hold		Swing		

=== Breckfield ===
Breckfield
Party	Candidate	Votes	%	±%
Labour	John McIntosh	972	66.4%	+2.9%
Liberal Democrats	James Gaskell	314	21.4	−5.0
Liberal	Daniel Wood	178	12.2	+2.1
Majority		658	45.0	+7.9
Registered electors				
Turnout		1,464	18.1	
Rejected ballots				
Labour hold		Swing		

=== Broadgreen ===
Broadgreen
Party	Candidate	Votes	%	±%
Liberal Democrats	Christopher Newby	1,244	54.9%	−5.3%
Labour	Peter Davidson	796	35.1	+4.9
Socialist Alliance	John Ralph	79	3.5	+0.3
Conservative	Keith Sutton	77	3.4	+0.8
Liberal	Deborah Tilston	71	3.1	−0.8
Majority		448	19.8%	−10.2%
Registered electors				
Turnout		2,267	19.8%	
Rejected ballots				
Liberal Democrats hold		Swing		

=== Childwall ===
Childwall
Party	Candidate	Votes	%	±%
Liberal Democrats	Trevor Jones	2,344	68.8%	
Labour	Janet Kent	623	18.3	
Conservative	George Powell	213	6.3	
Green	Anne Saunders	137	4.0	
Liberal	Francis Porter	88	2.6	
Majority		1,721	50.5	
Registered electors				
Turnout		3,405	25.9	
Rejected ballots				
Liberal Democrats hold		Swing		

=== Church ===
Church
Party	Candidate	Votes	%	±%
Liberal Democrats	Warren Bradley *	3,135	80.1%	+6.8%
Labour	Robert Carney	525	13.4	−2.8
Green	Eleanor Martin	254	6.5	+1.5
Majority		2,610	66.7	+8.6
Registered electors				
Turnout		3,914	26.4%	
Rejected ballots				
Liberal Democrats hold		Swing		

=== Clubmoor ===
Clubmoor
Party	Candidate	Votes	%	±%
Labour	Rochne Gladden	1,155	55.0%	+9.9%
Liberal Democrats	George Smith	713	33.9	+9.7
Liberal	Paul Jones	192	9.1	−21.5
Green	Eric Cartmel	41	2.0	+2.0
Majority		442	21.1	+6.6
Registered electors				
Turnout		2,101	23.8	
Rejected ballots				
Labour hold		Swing		

=== County ===
County
Party	Candidate	Votes	%	±%
Liberal Democrats	Marilyn Fielding	1,642	64.4%	+7.3%
Labour	Patrick Delahunty	856	33.6	−6.1
Liberal	Roger Webb	51	2.0	−1.2
Majority		786	28.8	+11.4
Registered electors				
Turnout		2,549	23.7%	
Rejected ballots				
Liberal Democrats hold		Swing		

=== Croxteth ===
Croxteth
Party	Candidate	Votes	%	±%
Liberal Democrats	Norman Mills *	2,070	66.2%	−2.7%
Labour	Peter Tuffley	650	20.8	−1.6
Conservative	Geoffrey Brandwood	237	7.6	+1.8
Green	Ian Graham	89	2.8	+2.8
Liberal	Barbara Pickstock	79	2.5	−0.5
Majority		1,420	45.4	−1.1
Registered electors				
Turnout		3,125	23.6%	
Rejected ballots				
Liberal Democrats hold		Swing		

=== Dingle ===
Dingle
Party	Candidate	Votes	%	±%
Liberal Democrats	John Coyne	1,489	59.9%	
Labour	Jack Johnson	880	35.4	
Conservative	David Patmore	74	3.0	
Liberal	David O'Brien	42	1.7	
Majority		609	24.5	
Registered electors				
Turnout		2,485	24.4%	
Rejected ballots				
Liberal Democrats hold		Swing		

=== Dovecot ===
Dovecot
Party	Candidate	Votes	%	±%
Liberal Democrats	Robert Ousby	1,175	50.0%	+8.0%
Labour	Nicholas Small	967	41.1	−7.5
Liberal	Tracey Hawksford	134	5.7	−0.8
Conservative	Audrey Bowness	75	3.2	+0.2
Majority		208	8.9	
Registered electors				
Turnout		2,351	25.2%	
Rejected ballots				
Liberal Democrats hold		Swing		

=== Everton ===
Everton
Party	Candidate	Votes	%	±%
Labour	Sharon Sullivan	442	54.6%	−0.8%
Liverpool Labour Community Party	Alfred Hincks	229	28.3%	+5.4%
Liberal Democrats	Eleanore Clein	81	10.0%	−2.0%
Green	Justine Williams	31	3.8%	+0.3%
Conservative	Catherine Hirst	14	1.7%	−2.8%
Liberal	Beryl Ackers	13	1.6%	−0.1%
Majority		213	26.3%	−6.2%
Registered electors				
Turnout		810	11.8%	
Rejected ballots				
Labour hold		Swing		

=== Fazakerley ===
Fazakerley
Party	Candidate	Votes	%	±%
Labour	Jack Spriggs	1,432	70.5%	+2.1%
Liberal Democrats	Graham Seddon	463	22.8	−3.0
Liberal	George roberts	136	6.7	+0.9
Majority		969	47.7	+5.1
Registered electors				
Turnout		2,031	18.8%	
Rejected ballots				
Labour hold		Swing		

=== Gillmoss ===
Gillmoss
Party	Candidate	Votes	%	±%
Labour	Martin Cummins	1,444	46.8%	−5.1%
Liberal Democrats	Patrick Moloney *	1,418	45.9%	+7.6%
Conservative	Brian Jones	103	3.3%	+0.7%
Liberal	Frances Fall	83	2.7%	−2.3%
Green	Anne Graham	38	1.2%	+1.2%
Majority		26	0.9%	−12.7%
Registered electors				
Turnout		3,086	22.8%	
Rejected ballots				
Labour gain from Liberal Democrats		Swing		

=== Granby ===
Granby
Party	Candidate	Votes	%	±%
Labour	Alan Dean	694	56.9%	−15.1%
Liberal Democrats	Annette Butler	264	21.7	+6.0
Socialist Alliance	Madeline Heneghan	99	8.1	+8.1
Green	Jean Hill	62	5.1	−2.6
Conservative	Kenneth Watkin	53	4.3	+1.6
Liberal	Susan O'Brien	47	3.9	+2.0
Majority		430	35.2	−21.1
Registered electors				
Turnout		1,219	15.3%	
Rejected ballots				
Labour hold		Swing		

=== Grassendale ===
Grassendale
Party	Candidate	Votes	%	±%
Liberal Democrats	Gerard Scott	2,270	68.3%	+0.4%
Labour	Catherine Dooley	526	15.8	−2.3
Conservative	Carl Cross	251	7.6	−1.5
Green	Jennifer Brown	185	5.6	+1.8
Liberal	Karen Williams	92	2.8	+1.7
Majority		1,744	52.5	+2.7
Registered electors				
Turnout		3,324	27.7	
Rejected ballots				
Liberal Democrats hold		Swing		

=== Kensington ===
Kensington
Party	Candidate	Votes	%	±%
Liberal Democrats	Frank Doran *	1,220	56.7%	+5.7%
Labour	Michael Fox	742	34.5	−9.6
BNP	Michael Shell	92	4.3	+4.3
Green	Faye Griffiths	45	2.1	+2.1
Conservative	Francis Dunne	30	1.4	−1.4
Liberal	James Richardson	23	1.1	−1.0
Majority		478	22.2	+15.3
Registered electors				
Turnout		2,152	21.5%	
Rejected ballots				
Liberal Democrats hold		Swing		

=== Melrose ===
Melrose
Party	Candidate	Votes	%	±%
Labour	Gary Booth	1,340	85.2%	+25.2
Liberal Democrats	Daniel Clein	180	11.4	−1.9
Liberal	Vivienne Woodward	53	3.4	−2.4
Majority		1,160	73.8	+34.8
Registered electors				
Turnout		1,573	17.1	
Rejected ballots				
Labour hold		Swing		

=== Netherley ===
Netherley
Party	Candidate	Votes	%	±%
Liberal Democrats	Thomas Marshall	837	51.7%	+13.9%
Labour	Oliver Martins	747	46.3	−9.6
Conservative	Joyce Larrosa	22	1.4	−0.2
Liberal	Jean Worrall	9	0.6	+0.6
Majority		87	5.4	
Registered electors				
Turnout		1,612	28.5%	
Rejected ballots				
Liberal Democrats hold		Swing		

=== Old Swan ===
Old Swan
Party	Candidate	Votes	%	±%
Liberal Democrats	Keith Turner	1,404	68%	
Labour	John McCabe	476	23.2	−3.4
Liberal	Edith Bamford	100	4.9	+1.3
Conservative	Francis Stevens	75	3.6	−0.5
Majority		928	45.1	+6.0
Registered electors				
Turnout		2,055	20.9%	
Rejected ballots				
Liberal Democrats hold		Swing		

=== Picton ===
Picton
Party	Candidate	Votes	%	±%
Liberal Democrats	Erica Kemp *	1,465	72.0%	+8.7%
Labour	Angela Glanville	413	20.3	−9.6
Green	Jennifer Andrew	113	5.6	+0.9
Conservative	Ann Temple	43	2.1	−0.1
Majority		1,052	51.7	+18.3
Registered electors				
Turnout		2,034	19.0%	
Rejected ballots				
Liberal Democrats hold		Swing		

=== Pirrie ===
Pirrie - (2 seats)
Party	Candidate	Votes	%	±%
Labour	Francis Cooke	1,038	65%	
Labour	Alan Walker	932	58%	
Liberal Democrats	Susan Lye	210	13%	
Liberal Democrats	Kelly Woods	177	11%	−18.2
Conservative	Mark Cotterell	157	11%	+5.3
Liberal	Charles Mayes	123	8%	
Conservative	Natalie Linnane	113	7%	
Liberal	Irene Mayes	109	7%	
Green	Laura Jackson	61	4%	
Green	Gerard Quayle	37	2%	
Majority		828		
Registered electors				
Turnout		2,957	16.2%	
Rejected ballots				
Labour hold		Swing		
Labour hold		Swing		

=== St. Mary's ===
St Mary's
Party	Candidate	Votes	%	±%
Liberal Democrats	Richard Oglethorpe	1,280	65.5%	+6.4%
Labour	Rodger Lafferty	464	23.8	−5.9
BNP	Raymond Malone	120	6.1	+0.3
Liberal	Michael Williams	49	2.5	−1.0
Conservative	Derek Nuttall	40	2.0	+0.2
Majority		816	41.7	+12.3
Registered electors				
Turnout		1,953	22.0%	
Rejected ballots				
Liberal Democrats hold		Swing		

=== Smithdown ===
Smithdown
Party	Candidate	Votes	%	±%
Liberal Democrats	Andrew Makinson	893	57.7%	+21.6%
Labour	Richard Keenan	495	32.0	−17.6
Green	Simon Holgate	89	5.7	+3.7
Liberal	John Moore	40	2.6	+0.2
Conservative	Grahame Harden	32	2.1	+0.8
Majority		398	25.7	
Registered electors				
Turnout		1,549	18.5	
Rejected ballots				
Liberal Democrats hold		Swing		

=== Speke ===
Speke
Party	Candidate	Votes	%	±%
Labour	Doreen Knight	651	51.3%	+2.1%
Liberal Democrats	George Smith	600	47.3	−1.3
Conservative	Denise Nuttall	18	1.4	−0.8
Majority		51	4.0	+3.4
Registered electors				
Turnout		1,269	20.6%	
Rejected ballots				
Liberal Democrats hold		Swing		

=== Tuebrook ===
Tuebrook
Party	Candidate	Votes	%	±%
Liberal	Christopher Lenton	1,667	71.9%	+0.4%
Labour	Pamela Thomas	405	17.5	+2.0
Liberal Democrats	James Woods	188	8.1	−1.1
Conservative	June Brandwood	60	2.6	+0.5
Majority		1,262	54.4	−1.6
Registered electors				
Turnout		2,320	21.0%	
Rejected ballots				
Liberal hold		Swing		

=== Valley ===
Valley
Party	Candidate	Votes	%	±%
Liberal Democrats	Francis O'Donoghue	936	50.8%	−5.6%
Labour	Christopher Nezianya	768	41.7	+5.7
Green	Vera Jones	56	3.0	+3.0
Liberal	Deborah Mayes	50	2.7	+1.4
Conservative	Norman Coppell	31	1.7	−0.8
Majority		168	9.1	−11.3
Registered electors				
Turnout		1,841	26.0%	
Rejected ballots				
Liberal Democrats hold		Swing		

=== Vauxhall ===
Vauxhall
Party	Candidate	Votes	%	±%
Liverpool Labour Community Party	Pauline Connolly *	805	53.0%	+53.0%
Labour	Christine Norris	633	41.7%	−45.8%
Liberal Democrats	Sean McHugh	34	2.2%	−6.6%
Liberal	Damien Daly	23	1.5%	+1.5%
Conservative	Alma McGing	12	0.8%	−1.0%
Green	Anja Ploger	12	0.8%	−1.0%
Majority		172	11.3%	
Registered electors				
Turnout		1,519	29.3%	
Rejected ballots				
Liverpool Labour Community Party gain from Labour				

=== Warbreck ===
Warbreck
Party	Candidate	Votes	%	±%
Liberal Democrats	Jean Seddon	1,317	49.6%	−12.6%
Labour	James Gabriel	1,029	38.8	+4.0
Liberal	Linda Roberts	307	11.6	+8.6
Majority		288	10.8	−16.6
Registered electors				
Turnout		2,653	19.4%	
Rejected ballots				
Liberal Democrats hold		Swing		

=== Woolton ===
Woolton
Party	Candidate	Votes	%	±%
Liberal Democrats	Barbara Mace	2,186	68.4%	+1.8%
Conservative	Stephen Fitzsimmons	411	12.9	−3.9
Labour	Francis Steer	392	12.3	−0.4
Liberal	Maria Langley	112	3.5	+2.4
Green	Naomi Rose	96	3.0	+0.3
Majority		1,775	55.5	+5.7
Registered electors				
Turnout		3,197	26.6	
Rejected ballots				
Liberal Democrats hold		Swing		
