= 1986 Liverpool City Council election =

1986 UK local government election

- 1 May 1986

34 seats were up for election (one third): one seat for each of the 33 wards, plus 1 by-election 50 seats needed for a majority

Elections to Liverpool City Council were held on 1 May 1986. One third of the council was up for election and the Labour Party kept overall control of the council.

After the election, the composition of the council was:

Party	Seats	±
Labour	54	-3
SDP-Liberal Alliance	37	+9
Conservative Party (UK)	7	-6

== Election result ==
Liverpool local election result 1986
Party	Seats	Gains	Losses	Net gain/loss	Seats %	Votes %	Votes	+/−
Labour	17				50%	40%	71,131	
Alliance	16				48%	43%	76,578	
Conservative	1				3%	12%	21,901	
Communist								
Others								

== Ward results ==
=== Abercromby ===
Abercromby
Party	Candidate	Votes	%	±%
Labour	A. Hood	1,947	70%	
Alliance	B. Aston	477	17%	
Conservative	H. V. Tracey Forster	151	5%	
Communist	S. Carroll	107	4%	
	N. Everard	97	3%	
Majority		1,470		
Turnout		2,779		

=== Aigburth ===
Aigburth
Party	Candidate	Votes	%	±%
Alliance	Douglas McKittrick	3,521	56%	
Labour	K. Taft	1,615	26%	
Conservative	J. Mass	886	14%	
	K. Prescott	266	4%	
Majority		1,906		
Turnout		6,288		

=== Allerton ===
Allerton
Party	Candidate	Votes	%	±%
Alliance	Flo Clucas	3,264	50%	
Conservative	T. Morrison	1,922	29%	
Labour	Dot Gavin	1,244	19%	
	R. Cantwell	121	2%	
Majority		1,342		
Turnout		6,551		

=== Anfield ===
Anfield
Party	Candidate	Votes	%	±%
Alliance	Vera Best	3,184	51%	
Labour	C. Williams	2,514	40%	
Conservative	J. Brash	553	9%	
Majority		670		
Turnout		6,251		

=== Arundel ===
Arundel
Party	Candidate	Votes	%	±%
Alliance	Mary Johnson	2,560	51%	
Labour	K. Feintuck	1,814	36%	
Conservative	S. Fitzsimmons	450	9%	
	G. Thompson	166	3%	
	J. Kay	60	1%	
Majority		746		
Turnout		5,050		

=== Breckfield ===
Breckfield 2 seats
Party	Candidate	Votes	%	±%
Labour	J. Brazier	2,538	56%	
Labour	P. Skinley	2,434	53%	
Alliance	J. Kendrick	1,967	43%	
Alliance	J. Diamond	1,820	40%	
Conservative	E. Bayley	227	5%	
Conservative	J. Atkinson	207	5%	
Majority		571		
Turnout		4,732		

=== Broadgreen ===
Broadgreen
Party	Candidate	Votes	%	±%
Alliance	Geoffrey B Smith	3,337	53%	
Labour	A. Dean	2,442	39%	
Conservative	M. Kingston	527	8%	
Majority		895		
Turnout		6,306		

=== Childwall ===
Childwall
Party	Candidate	Votes	%	±%
Alliance	Doreen Jones	4,416	59%	
Conservative	S. Airey	1,788	24%	
Labour	R. Griffiths	1,241	17%	
Majority		3,175		
Turnout		7,445		

=== Church ===
Church
Party	Candidate	Votes	%	±%
Alliance	Len Tyrer	4,749	60%	
Conservative	S. Atherton	1,769	22%	
Labour	J. Murray	1,195	15%	
	J. Hulton	235	3%	
Majority		3,554		
Turnout		7,948		

=== Clubmoor ===
Clubmoor
Party	Candidate	Votes	%	±%
Labour	R. Gladden	3,300	58%	
Alliance	F. Roderick	1,752	31%	
Conservative	J. Greaves	685	12%	
Majority		1,548		
Turnout		5,737		

=== County ===
County
Party	Candidate	Votes	%	±%
Alliance	Sybil Brookes	3,340	53%	
Labour	R. Quinn	2,605	41%	
Conservative	R. Kaney	352	6%	
Majority		735		
Turnout		6,297		

=== Croxteth ===
Croxteth
Party	Candidate	Votes	%	±%
Alliance	Gillian Bundred	3,155	46%	
Conservative	E. Fitzpatrick	1,903	28%	
Labour	C. Guy	1,731	25%	
Majority		1,424		
Turnout		6,789		

=== Dingle ===
Dingle
Party	Candidate	Votes	%	±%
Alliance	R. Isaacson	2,589	48%	
Labour	T. Prout	2,558	47%	
Conservative	D. Patmore	238	4%	
	J. Cook	44	1%	
Majority		31		
Turnout		5,429		

=== Dovecot ===
Dovecot
Party	Candidate	Votes	%	±%
Labour	W. Westbury	2,497	61%	
Alliance	T. Jones	1,160	28%	
Conservative	W. Connolly	443	11%	
Majority		1,337		
Turnout		4,100		

=== Everton ===
Everton
Party	Candidate	Votes	%	±%
Labour	G. Allen	2,028	82%	
Alliance	T. Geary	314	13%	
Conservative	R. Fairclough	130	5%	
Majority		1,714		
Turnout		2,472		

=== Fazakerley ===
Fazakerley
Party	Candidate	Votes	%	±%
Labour	John Linden	2,667	57%	
Alliance	D. Stephenson	1,327	29%	
Conservative	J. Quincy	660	14%	
Majority		1,340		
Turnout		4,654		

=== Gillmoss ===
Gillmoss
Party	Candidate	Votes	%	±%
Labour	Anthony Jennings	2,748	72%	
Alliance	E. Boult	741	19%	
Conservative	A. Hinks	375	10%	
Majority		2,007		
Turnout		3,864		

=== Granby ===
Granby
Party	Candidate	Votes	%	±%
Labour	D. Leach	2,287	54%	
Alliance	C. Laidlaw	1,351	32%	
	S. Burris	427	10%	
Conservative	G. Tann	148	3%	
	E. Caddick	60	1%	
Majority		936		
Turnout		4,273		

=== Grassendale ===
Grassendale
Party	Candidate	Votes	%	±%
Alliance	Beatrice Fraenkel	5,014	70%	
Conservative	M. Wood	1,292	18%	
Labour	E. Turnbull	850	12%	
Majority		4,164		
Turnout		7,156		

=== Kensington ===
Kensington
Party	Candidate	Votes	%	±%
Alliance	Frank Doran	2,976	56%	
Labour	J. Spencer	2,171	41%	
Conservative	D. Dougherty	212	4%	
Majority		805		
Turnout		5,359		

=== Melrose ===
Melrose
Party	Candidate	Votes	%	±%
Labour	Dawn Booth	2,832	56%	
Alliance	Neil Cardwell	1,930	38%	
Conservative	M. Fitzsimmons	233	5%	
	Carol Taggart	28	1%	
Majority		902		
Turnout		5,023		

=== Netherley ===
Netherley
Party	Candidate	Votes	%	±%
Labour	H. Adams	2,001	62%	
Alliance	H. Williams	958	30%	
Conservative	A. McTigue	248	8%	
Majority		1,043		
Turnout		3,207		

=== Old Swan ===
Old Swan
Party	Candidate	Votes	%	±%
Alliance	Anthony Loftus	3,114	53%	
Labour	J. Hollinshead	2,307	39%	
Conservative	A. Wilson	471	8%	
Majority		807		
Turnout		5,892		

=== Picton ===
Picton
Party	Candidate	Votes	%	±%
Alliance	Herbert Herrity	2,811	56%	
Labour	K. Hackett	1,907	38%	
Conservative	A. Scadding	247	5%	
	G. Quayle	97	2%	
Majority		904		
Turnout		5,062		

=== Pirrie ===
Pirrie
Party	Candidate	Votes	%	±%
Labour	P. Owens	3,182	68%	
Alliance	W. Burke	1,094	23%	
Conservative	F. Stevens Jnr.	424	9%	
Majority		2,088		
Turnout		4,700		

=== St. Mary's ===
St. Mary's
Party	Candidate	Votes	%	±%
Labour	H. Keiden	2,773	50%	
Alliance	Peter Millea	2,363	43%	
Conservative	R. Parkes	394	7%	
Majority		410		
Turnout		5,530		

=== Smithdown ===
Smithdown
Party	Candidate	Votes	%	±%
Labour	A. Gamble	2,152	50%	
Alliance	E. Stephenson	2,003	47%	
Conservative	F. Sellers	108	3%	
Majority		149		
Turnout		4,263		

=== Speke ===
Speke
Party	Candidate	Votes	%	±%
Labour	F. Dowling	2,527	71%	
Alliance	R. Gould	662	19%	
Conservative	A. Fayer	386	19%	
Majority		1,865		
Turnout		3,575		

=== Tuebrook ===
Tuebrook
Party	Candidate	Votes	%	±%
Alliance	John Jones	3,383	59%	
Labour	F. Vaudrey Jnr.	1,890	33%	
Conservative	J. McMillan	456	8%	
Majority		1,493		
Turnout		5,729		

=== Valley ===
Valley
Party	Candidate	Votes	%	±%
Labour	P. Astbury	2,228	57%	
Alliance	I. Phillips	1,285	33%	
Conservative	M. Murphy	389	10%	
Majority		943		
Turnout		3,902		

=== Vauxhall ===
Vauxhall
Party	Candidate	Votes	%	±%
Labour	J. Morgan	2,034	90%	
Alliance	M. Alman	232	10%	
Majority		1,802		
Turnout		2,266		

=== Warbreck ===
Warbreck
Party	Candidate	Votes	%	±%
Alliance	Richard Roberts	2,968	46%	
Labour	J. Williams	2,532	39%	
Conservative	I. Brown	855	13%	
	B. Barr	61	1%	
	I. Sloan	55	1%	
Majority		436		
Turnout		6,471		

=== Woolton ===
Woolton
Party	Candidate	Votes	%	±%
Conservative	Christopher Hallows	2,989	45%	
Alliance	E. Jones	2,654	40%	
Labour	G. Casey	826	13%	
Majority		335		
Turnout		6,600		

== By Elections ==
On 12 March 1987 16 Militant and 31 non-Militant Labour Councillors were disbarred from office

Name	Ward	Elected
Heather Adams	Netherley	8 May 1986
Paul Astbury	Valley	8 May 1986
Mike Black	Pirrie	5 May 1983
Dominic Brady	Everton	5 May 1983
Tony Byrne	Valley	5 May 1983
Eddie Burke	Dovecot	3 May 1984
Jackie Crowley	Anfield	3 May 1984
Hugh Dalton	Pirrie	3 May 1984
Joe Devaney	Abercromby	3 May 1984
Jimmy Dillon	Broadgreen	5 May 1983
Alex Doswell	Granby	3 May 1984
Felicity Dowling	Speke	8 May 1986
Steve Ellison	Breckfield	3 May 1984
Peter Ferguson	Dingle	3 May 1984
Alan Fogg	Kensington	3 May 1984
Alex Gamble	Smithdown	8 May 1986
Roy Gladden	Clubmoor	8 May 1986
Jimmy Hackett	Warbreck	5 May 1983
John Hamilton	Granby	5 May 1983
Willy Harper	Netherley	3 May 1984
Derek Hatton	Netherley	5 May 1983
John Humphries	St. Mary's	5 May 1983
Tony Hood	Abercromby	6 May 1982
Steve Jenkins	Smithdown	5 May 1983
Paul Lafferty	Clubmoor	5 May 1983
Bob Lancaster	Melrose	5 May 1983
Dave Leach	Granby	8 May 1986
John Linden	Fazakerley	8 May 1986
Dave Lloyd	Fazakerley	3 May 1984
George Lloyd	Old Swan	5 May 1983
Pauline Lowes	Melrose	5 May 1983
Paul Luckock	Vauxhall	5 May 1983
John Mackintosh	Breckfield	5 May 1983
Dorothy Mathews	Smithdown	3 May 1984
Frank Mills	County	5 May 1983
Tony Mulhearn	St. Mary's	3 May 1984
John Nelson	Fazakerley	5 May 1983
John Ord	Speke	3 May 1984
Peter Owens	Pirrie	8 May 1986
Jimmy Parry	Everton	3 May 1984
Terry Prout	Dingle	By election
Tony Rimmer	Gillmoss	3 May 1984
Jimmy Rutledge	Abercromby	5 May 1983
Harry Smith	Valley	3 May 1984
Vinny Wagner	Melrose	3 May 1984
Bill Westbury	Dovecot	1 May 1986
Franny Wiles	Everton	6 May 1982
