= Flo Clucas =

Helen Flora Clucas OBE (born 9 May 1947), known as Flo Clucas (née Turner), is a British local politician in Cheltenham, England, previously in Liverpool.

== Early life ==
Born in Everton, Liverpool, on 9 May 1947, Clucas was educated at Bellerive Girls' Convent School, which was then a direct grant grammar school, left at sixteen, and got a job as a trainee dental nurse. She later returned to education, training as a teacher at St Mary's College of Education, Bangor and the Liverpool Institute of Higher Education.

== Career ==
By the early 1980s, Clucas was working as a schoolteacher. At the 1982 and 1983 Liverpool City Council elections, she stood unsuccessfully for the Social Democrats. At the elections in 1986, she was first elected to Liverpool City Council representing the SDP–Liberal Alliance and after that was a councillor for 26 years. By 1987, she was the SDP parliamentary candidate for Halton and was interviewed by the New Statesman, saying that she had "a passionately Tory grandmother who taught her that Labour meant bolshevism", but she had rejected the Tories as "racist and harsh".

In 1998, the Liverpool Liberal Democrats took control of the city council and Clucas became its deputy leader, with Mike Storey as leader. In 1994, she stood for the European Parliament in Merseyside East and Wigan, and in 2004 stood in North West England. Through the political balance of the Local Government Association, by 2001 she had been appointed to the European Union's Committee of the Regions and took an active role in it. She worked on reports on regional and housing policyand in 2008 became the leader of the Alliance of Liberals and Democrats for Europe group, but ceased to be a member in 2012.

Clucas also stood for parliament unsuccessfully eight times, including the 1997 Wirral South by-election. She also chaired the Liberal Democrat Women and held other party offices.

In May 2013, Clucas decided not to fight the 2014 Liverpool City Council election in her Allerton and Hunts Cross ward, as she was planning to move to Cheltenham to be nearer her family there. At that election, her party lost almost all its seats in Liverpool. In May 2014, she held a Liberal Democrat seat in the 2014 Cheltenham Borough Council election.

In the 2024 United Kingdom General Election, Clucas campaigned as a Liberal Democrat in the Swindon North constituency, coming in fifth place with 4.7% of the vote.

== Personal life ==
Clucas met her husband, John Clucas at the Cavern Club in the early 1960s. They were married in Liverpool in 1968 and have two sons and four grandchildren.

== Honours ==
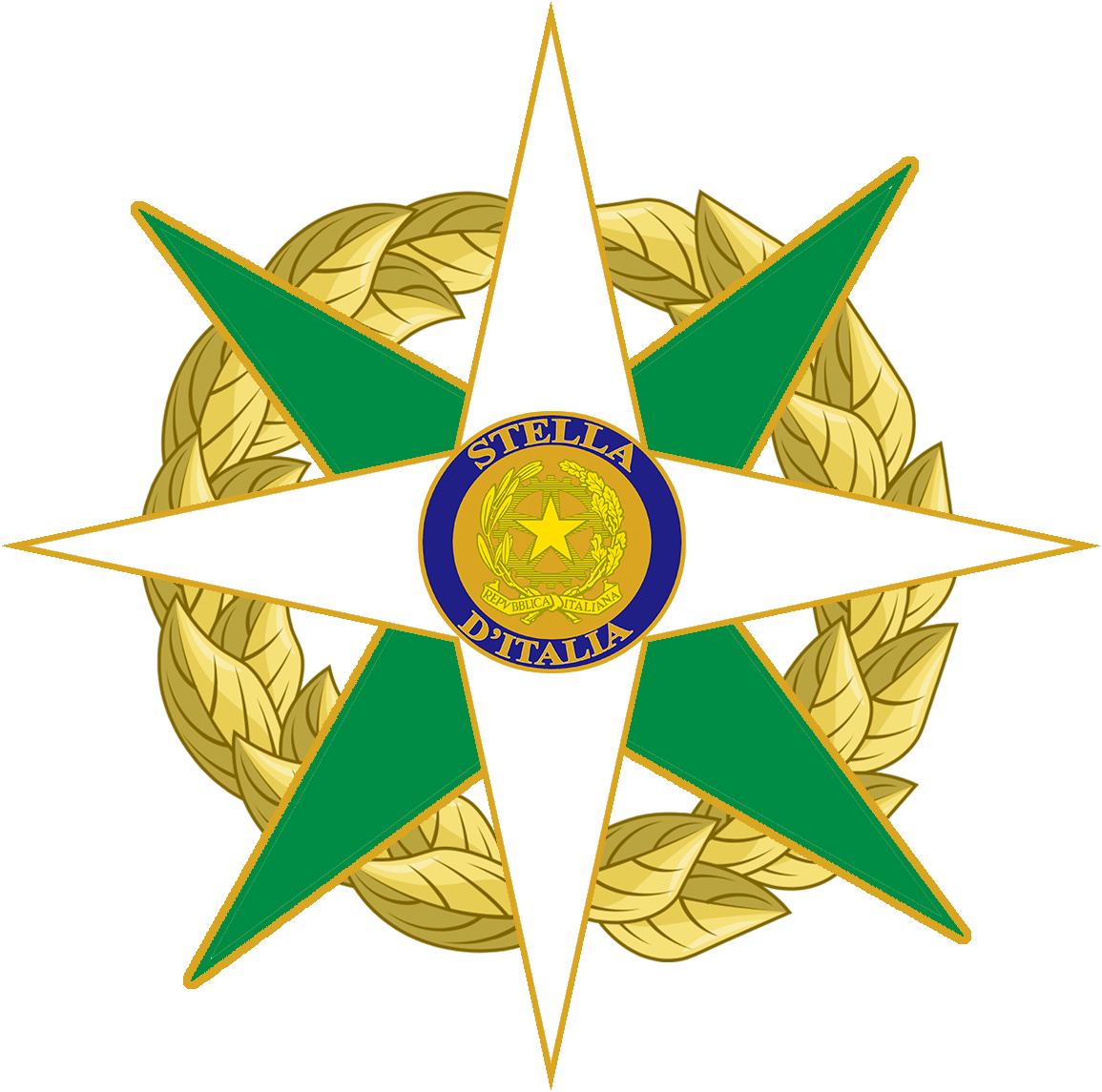
Order of the Star of Italy

- Officer of the Order of the British Empire, 2005, for services to the community in Merseyside.
- Honorary degree of Doctor of Laws from the University of Liverpool, July 2013.
- Order of the Star of Italy, 2009.
