= Pirrie (Liverpool ward) =

Former ward of Liverpool City Council (UK)

- Pirrie ward (1980) within Liverpool
- Registered Electors: 9,135 (2003 election)
- Metropolitan borough: City of Liverpool
- Metropolitan county: Merseyside
- Region: North West
- Country: England
- Sovereign state: United Kingdom
- UK Parliament: Liverpool Walton

Pirrie ward was an electoral division of Liverpool City Council between 1953 and 2004. It and was within the northern part of the Norris Green district of Liverpool.

== Background ==
The ward was first formed in 1953, its boundaries were changed in 1980 and was dissolved in 2004.

=== 1953 boundaries ===
1953 boundaries

The ward was part of the Liverpool Walton Parliamentary constituency.

=== 1973 election ===
1973 boundaries

Following the Local Government Act 1972 the ward boundaries of the council were altered. The number of wards was reduced from 40 to 33 and the aldermanic system was abolished. Pirrie ward was retained and returned three councillors.

=== 1980 boundaries ===
A report of the Local Government Boundary Commission for England published in November 1978 set out proposals for changes to the wards of Liverpool City Council, maintaining the number of councillors at 99 representing 33 wards. Pirrie ward was retained to be represented by three councillors.

The report describes the boundaries of Pirrie ward as "Commencing at a point where Utting Avenue meets Richard Kelly Drive, thence northwestwards along said drive to Walton Hall Avenue, thence northeastwards along said avenue to the northeastern boundary of Walton Hall Park, thence northwestwards along said boundary to the southeastern boundary of Warbreck Ward, thence generally northeastwards along said boundary and southern boundary of Fazakerley Ward to the western boundary of Gillmoss Ward, thence southeastwards along said boundary to Utting Avenue East, thence southwest-wards along said avenue and Utting Avenue to the point of commencement".

The ward was part of the Liverpool Walton Parliamentary constituency.

=== 2004 election ===
A review by the Boundary Committee for England recommended that the council was formed of a reduced number of 90 members elected from 30 wards. Pirrie ward was dissolved and distributed into the new Norris Green ward and the re-arranged Clubmoor ward, with a small part in the rearranged Warbreck ward.

== See also ==
- Liverpool City Council
- Liverpool City Council elections 1880–present
- Liverpool Town Council elections 1835 - 1879
