= Norris Green (Liverpool ward) =

Metropolitan borough council ward in Liverpool, England

Coordinates: 53.441°N 2.9235°W

- Norris Green ward within Liverpool
- Population: 17,320 (2021 census)
- Registered Electors: 11,144 (2023 election)
- Metropolitan borough: City of Liverpool
- Metropolitan county: Merseyside
- Region: North West
- Country: England
- Sovereign state: United Kingdom
- UK Parliament: Liverpool Walton
- Councillors: Gerard Heffey (Labour); Lena McCormick (Labour); Kevin Pilnick (Labour)

Norris Green ward is an electoral division of Liverpool City Council centred on the Norris Green district of Liverpool. The ward sits within the Liverpool Walton Parliamentary constituency.

== Background ==
The ward was formed for the 2004 Municipal elections and its boundaries were changed for the 2023 elections. The ward is represented by three councillors.

=== 2004 boundaries ===
2004 Norris Green ward

The ward was formed from the former Pirrie, Clubmoor, Fazakerley and Gillmoss wards.

The ward boundaries followed Lower Lane, Lower House Lane, Dwerryhouse Lane, Muirhead Avenue East, Lorenzo Drive, Parthenon Drive, Stopgate Lane, Long Lane, around Bank View High School and the southern boundary of the Joe Stone Playing Fields.

The population of the 2004 ward at the 2021 census of 19,610.

=== 2023 boundaries ===
The ward boundaries were changed in 2023 following a review by the Local Government Boundary Commission for England which decided that the existing 30 wards each represented by three Councillors should be replaced by 64 wards represented by 85 councillors with varying representation by one, two or three councillors per ward.

The Norris Green ward remained a three-member ward, losing the area north of the East Lancashire Road to the new Fazakerley West ward, and gaining a section of the former Clubmoor ward to the east of the North Liverpool Extension Line. The ward boundaries follow Walton Hall Avenue, Lower House Lane, Muirhead Avenue, the North Liverpool Extension Line, Townsend Avenue and Parthenon Drive.

The population of the ward at the 2021 census was 17,320.

== Councillors ==
The ward has returned eleven councillors.

Election	Councillor	Councillor	Councillor
2004	Vi Bebb (Lab)	Alan Walker (Lab)	Frank Cooke (Lab)
2006	Vi Bebb (Lab)	Alan Walker (Lab)	Frank Cooke (Lab)
2007	Vi Bebb (Lab)	Alan Walker (Lab)	Frank Cooke (Lab)
2008	Vi Bebb (Lab)	Alan Walker (Lab)	Frank Cooke (Lab)
2010	Vi Bebb (Lab)	Alan Walker (Lab)	Frank Cooke (Lab)
2011	Vi Bebb (Lab)	Alan Walker (Lab)	Frank Cooke (Lab)
2012	Vi Bebb (Lab)	Alan Walker (Lab)	Barry Kushner (Lab)
2014	Debbie Caine (Lab)	Alan Walker (Lab)	Barry Kushner (Lab)
2015	Debbie Caine (Lab)	Alan Walker (Lab)	Barry Kushner (Lab)
2016	Sharon Ross (Lab)	Alan Walker (Lab)	Barry Kushner (Lab)
2018	Sharon Ross (Lab)	Alan Walker (Lab)	Barry Kushner (Lab)
2019	Sharon Ross (Lab)	George Knibb (Lab)	Barry Kushner (Lab)
2021	Liz Parsons (Lab)	George Knibb (Lab)	Barry Kushner (Lab)
WARD REFORMED
2023	Gerard Heffey (Lab)	Lena McCormick (Lab)	Kevin Pilnick (Lab)

indicates seat up for re-election after boundary changes.

indicates seat up for re-election.

indicates change in affiliation.

indicates seat up for re-election after casual vacancy.

== Election results ==
=== Elections of the 2020s ===
4th May 2023
Party	Candidate	Votes	%	±%
**Labour**	**Gerard Heffey**	**1,611**	**28.89**	
**Labour**	**Lena McCormick**	**1,472**	**26.39**	
**Labour**	**Kevin Pilnick**	**1,342**	**24.06**	
Independent	Natasha Jane Ellison	340	6.10	
Green	Hilary Brenda McDonagh	296	5.31	
Liberal Democrats	Helen Margaret Dietz	259	4.64	
TUSC	Ann Barbara Walsh	257	4.61	
Majority		1,271		
Turnout				
Registered electors		11,144		
Rejected ballots		9		
Labour **win** (new seat)				
Labour **win** (new seat)				
Labour **win** (new seat)				

6th May 2021
Party	Candidate	Votes	%	±%
**Labour**	**Liz Parsons**	**1,889**	**69.91**	**▼10.89**
Green	Rebecca Lawson	223	8.25	▼0.96
Conservative	Alma McGing	188	6.96	▲2.49
Liberal	Paul Wynne Jones	157	5.81	▲3.59
Liberal Democrats	James Michael Thornhill	123	4.55	▲1.25
TUSC	Ann Barbara Walsh	122	4.52	
Majority		1,666	61.66	▼9.93
Turnout		2,702	21.18	▲0.24
Registered electors		12,760		
Rejected ballots		73	2.63	▲1.48
Labour **hold**		Swing	-4.97	

=== Elections of the 2010s ===
Liverpool City Council Municipal Elections: 2nd May 2019
Party	Candidate	Votes	%	±%
**Labour**	**George Knibb**	**2,079**	**80.80%**	**▼5.03**
Green	Martyn Madeley	237	9.21%	▲4.04
Conservative	Alma McGing	115	4.47%	▼0.36
Liberal Democrats	Angela Hulme	85	3.30%	▲1.03
Liberal	Colin Edwards	57	2.22%	▲0.35
Majority		1,842	71.59%	▼9.04
Turnout		2,603	20.94%	▼1.72
Registered electors		12,433		
Rejected ballots		30	1.15%	▲0.60
Labour **hold**		Swing	▲4.52	

Liverpool City Council Municipal Elections: 3rd May 2018
Party	Candidate	Votes	%	±%
Labour	**Barry Kushner**	2,344	85.83%	▲7.54
Green	Martyn Madeley	142	5.20%	▼1.64
Conservative	Alma McGing	132	4.83%	▲1.57
Liberal Democrats	Sam Buist	62	2.27%	N/A
Liberal	Brenda Jean Edwards	51	1.87%	N/A
Majority		2,202	80.63%	▼4.50
Turnout		2,746	22.66%	▼17.13
Registered electors		12,116		
Rejected ballots		15	0.55%	▲0.27
Labour **hold**		Swing	▲4.59	

Liverpool City Council Municipal Elections: 5th May 2016 (2 seats)
Party	Candidate	Votes	%	±%
Labour	**Sharon Ross**	1,733	78.29%	▲9.09
Labour	**Barry Kushner**	**1,701**	-	−
UKIP	Jamie Sanderson	300	6.86%	▼13.29
Green	Martyn Paul Madeley	227	6.84%	▲3.76
TUSC	Ann Barbara Walsh	197	4.50%	N/A
Conservative	Gillian Michele Ferrigno	82	3.26%	▲0.79
Green	Elke Weissmann	73		−
Conservative	Alma Gavine McGing	61	1.39%	▼1.08
Majority		3,134	85.13%	▲37.06
Turnout		4,386	39.79%	▲11.83
Registered electors		11,022		
Rejected ballots		12	0.27%	
Labour **hold**		Swing	▲11.19	
Labour **hold**		Swing		

Liverpool City Council Municipal Elections 2015: 7th May 2015
Party	Candidate	Votes	%	±%
**Labour**	**Alan Walker**	**5,297**	**80.75%**	**▲11.55**
UKIP	Neil Martin Kenny	582	8.87%	▼11.26
Conservative	Gillian Michele Ferrigno	202	3.08%	▲0.61
Green	Richard Peter Walsh	196	2.99%	▼0.09
TUSC	Ann Barbara Walsh	161	2.45%	▼1.68
Liberal	Brenda Jean Edwards	122	1.86%	N/A
Majority		4,715	71.88%	▲23.81
Turnout		6,583	60.16%	▲32.20
Registered electors		10,943		
Rejected ballots		23	0.35	
Labour **hold**		Swing	▲11.40	

Liverpool City Council Municipal Elections 2014: 22nd May 2014
Party	Candidate	Votes	%	±%
Labour	**Debbie Caine**	2016	69.20%	−17.22%
UKIP	Joe Gallagher	595	20.13%	n/a
TUSC	Mary Ann Wheeler	122	4.13%	n/a
Green	Fee Coyne	91	3.08%	+1.30%
Conservative	Gillian Michele Ferrigno	73	2.47%	+0.27%
Liberal Democrats	Diane Burns	59	2.00%	+0.18%
Majority		1,421	48.07%	−33.37%
Turnout		2956	27.96%	+0.09%
Labour **hold**		Swing		

Liverpool City Council Municipal Elections 2012: 3rd May 2012
Party	Candidate	Votes	%	±%
Labour	**Barry Kushner**	2431	86.42%	−2.82%
Liberal	Lisa Gaskell	140	4.98%	+1.21%
British Freedom	Peter Squire	78	2.77%	n/a
Conservative	Gilliam Michele Ferrigno	62	2.20%	−1.79%
Liberal Democrats	Steven Kenneth Jackson Hilditch	52	1.85%	n/a
Green	Theresa Anne Larkins	50	1.78%	−1.22%
Majority		2,291	81.44%	−3.81%
Turnout		2813	27.87%	−3.45%
Labour **hold**		Swing	-0.81%	

Liverpool City Council Municipal Elections 2011: 5th May 2011
Party	Candidate	Votes	%	±%
Labour	**Alan Walker**	**2796**	**89.24%**	+14.05%
Conservative	Gillian Michelle Ferrigno	125	3.99%	−1.88%
Liberal	Patricia Margaret Elmour	118	3.77%	−6.70%
Green	Elspeth Anwar	94	3.00%	+1.23%
Majority		2671	85.25%	+20.54
Turnout		3133	31.32%	−20.04
Labour **hold**		Swing	10.38%	

Liverpool City Council Municipal Elections 2010: Norris Green
Party	Candidate	Votes	%	±%
Labour	**Vi Bebb**	**3948**	**75.19%**	
Liberal	Charles Railton Mayes	550	10.47%	
BNP	John Edgar	312	5.94%	
Conservative	George Powell	308	5.87%	
Green	Elspeth Anwar	93	1.77%	
Socialist Labour	Kim Singleton	40	0.76%	
Majority		3398	64.71%	
Turnout		5251	51.36%	
Labour **hold**		Swing		

=== Elections of the 2000s ===
Liverpool City Council Municipal Elections 2008: Norris Green
Party	Candidate	Votes	%	±%
Labour	**Francis William Cooke**	**1520**	**64.49%**	
BNP	John Edgar	303	12.86%	
Liberal	Vera Philips	258	10.95%	
Conservative	Michael Lind	148	6.28%	
Green	Thomas Martin Crone	70	2.97%	
Socialist Labour	Kai Anderson	58	2.46%	
Majority				
Turnout		2357	22.41%	
Labour **hold**		Swing		

Liverpool City Council Municipal Elections 2007: Norris Green
Party	Candidate	Votes	%	±%
Labour	**Alan Walker**	**1552**	**63.61%**	
BNP	John Edgar	205	8.40%	
Liberal Democrats	Christine Margaret Doyle	173	7.09%	
Independent	Paul Breen	141	5.78%	
Conservative	Mark Rea	116	4.75%	
Socialist Labour	Kai Anderson	111	4.55%	
Liberal	Vera Phillips	86	3.52%	
Green	Eric Cartmel	56	2.30%	
Majority				
Turnout		2440	23.11%	
Labour **hold**		Swing		

Liverpool City Council Municipal Elections 2006: Norris Green
Party	Candidate	Votes	%	±%
Labour	**Violet Bebb**	**1387**	**59.25%**	
BNP	John Edgar	417	17.81%	
Liberal Democrats	Christine Margaret Doyle	232	9.91%	
Green	Eric Cartmel	111	4.74%	
Liberal	Vera Phillips	99	4.23%	
Conservative	Jonathan Kearney	95	4.06%	
Majority				
Turnout		2341	21.09%	
Labour **hold**		Swing		

After the boundary change of 2004 the whole of Liverpool City Council faced election. Three Councillors were returned.

Liverpool City Council Municipal Elections 2004: Norris Green
Party	Candidate	Votes	%	±%
Labour	**Francis Cooke**	**1850**		
Labour	**Alan Walker**	**1826**		
Labour	**Violet Bebb**	**1713**		
Liberal Democrats	Kelly Woods	417		
Liberal Democrats	Cecilia McBride	387		
Liberal Democrats	Linda Woods	370		
BNP	Joseph Owens	327		
Liberal	Charles Mayes	280		
Liberal	Vera Phillips	272		
Liberal	Irene Mayes	269		
Green	Eric Cartmel	199		
Socialist Labour	Kai Anderson	167		
Majority				
Turnout		3173	28.57%	
Labour **hold**		Swing	n/a	

• italics - Denotes the sitting Councillor.
• bold - Denotes the winning candidate.
