= 1978 Liverpool City Council election =

1978 UK local government election

| ← 1976 | 4 May 1978 | 1980 → |

35 seats were up for election (one third): one seat for each of the 33 wards, plus two by-elections, Gillmoss and Low Hill, Smithdown 50 seats needed for a majority

Elections to Liverpool City Council were held on 4 May 1978. One third of the council was up for election and John Hamilton of the Labour Party became Leader of the Council albeit without overall control.

After the election, the composition of the council was:

| Party | Seats | ± |
|---|---|---|
| Labour | 37 | -1 |
| Liberal | 35 | -7 |
| Conservative | 27 | +8 |

== Election result ==
Liverpool local election result 1978
| Party | Seats | Gains | Losses | Net gain/loss | Seats % | Votes % | Votes | +/− |
|---|---|---|---|---|---|---|---|---|
| Labour | 14 | 1 | 2 | -1 | 40% | 33% | 43,339 | |
| Conservative | 11 | 8 | 0 | +8 | 24% | 37% | 48,684 | |
| Liberal | 10 | 1 | 8 | -7 | 29% | 29% | 38,317 | |
| Communist | 0 | 0 | 0 | 0 | 0% | 0.46% | 606 | |
| Socialist Unity | 0 | 0 | 0 | 0 | 0% | 0.3% | 373 | |
| Independent Liberal | 0 | 0 | 0 | 0 | 0% | 0.1% | 112 | |
| Socialist Workers | 0 | 0 | 0 | 0 | 0% | 0.08% | 102 | |
| Workers Revolutionary | 0 | 0 | 0 | 0 | 0% | 0.03% | 39 | |
| Immigrant Party | 0 | 0 | 0 | 0 | 0% | 0.02% | 23 | |

== Ward results ==
* - Councillor seeking re-election

^{(PARTY)} - Party of former Councillor

=== Abercromby, St. James ===
Abercromby, St. James
| Party | Candidate | Votes | % | ±% |
|---|---|---|---|---|
| Labour | E. Shields * | 1,571 | 51% | −14% |
| Liberal | Christopher Graham Davies | 988 | 32% | +22% |
| Conservative | M. E. Cheshire | 291 | 9% | +3% |
| Communist | R. O'Hara | 215 | 7% | −6% |
| Majority | | 583 | | |
| Registered electors | | 12,585 | | |
| Turnout | | 3,065 | 24% | |
| Labour hold | | Swing | | |

=== Aigburth ===
Aigburth
| Party | Candidate | Votes | % | ±% |
|---|---|---|---|---|
| Conservative | F. Fawcett | 3,775 | 62% | +25% |
| Liberal | I. R. Porteous ^{(PARTY)} | 1,655 | 27% | −28% |
| Labour | F. Dunee | 656 | 11% | +2% |
| Majority | | 2,120 | | |
| Registered electors | | 14,821 | | |
| Turnout | | 6,086 | 41% | |
| Conservative gain from Liberal | | Swing | | |

=== Allerton ===
Allerton
| Party | Candidate | Votes | % | ±% |
|---|---|---|---|---|
| Conservative | W. H. Fearenside | 2,561 | 65% | +18% |
| Liberal | J. B. Kaitiff ^{(PARTY)} | 754 | 19% | −23% |
| Labour | J. R. Brown | 637 | 16% | +7% |
| Majority | | 1,807 | | |
| Registered electors | | 10,886 | | |
| Turnout | | 3,952 | 36% | |
| Conservative hold | | Swing | | |

=== Anfield ===
Anfield
| Party | Candidate | Votes | % | ±% |
|---|---|---|---|---|
| Conservative | J. H. Brash | 1,782 | 43% | +19% |
| Labour | T. McManus | 1,406 | 34% | −2% |
| Liberal | Joseph Robert Wilmington * | 980 | 24% | −20% |
| Majority | | 376 | | |
| Registered electors | | 12,747 | | |
| Turnout | | 4,168 | 33% | |
| Conservative gain from Liberal | | Swing | | |

=== Arundel ===
Arundel
| Party | Candidate | Votes | % | ±% |
|---|---|---|---|---|
| Conservative | R. S. Fairclough | 1,397 | 36% | +17% |
| Liberal | P. H. Hodgson ^{(PARTY)} | 1,269 | 33% | −27% |
| Labour | J. McLean | 1,028 | 27% | +6% |
| Communist | J. Kay | 145 | 4% | |
| Majority | | 128 | | |
| Registered electors | | 13,140 | | |
| Turnout | | 3,839 | 29% | |
| Conservative gain from Liberal | | Swing | | |

=== Breckfield, St. Domingo ===
Breckfield, St. Domingo
| Party | Candidate | Votes | % | ±% |
|---|---|---|---|---|
| Liberal | David M.B. Croft ^{(PARTY)} | 2,490 | 64% | +10% |
| Labour | S. J. Gorman | 912 | 23% | −9% |
| Conservative | H. M. Rigby | 491 | 13% | −1% |
| Majority | | 1,578 | | |
| Registered electors | | 11,963 | | |
| Turnout | | 3,893 | 33% | |
| Liberal hold | | Swing | | |

=== Broadgreen ===
Broadgreen
| Party | Candidate | Votes | % | ±% |
|---|---|---|---|---|
| Conservative | E. F. Pine | 1,869 | 42% | +28% |
| Liberal | Roger Johnston | 1,774 | 39% | −15% |
| Labour | P. Lloyd | 859 | 19% | −13% |
| Majority | | 95 | | |
| Registered electors | | 12,105 | | |
| Turnout | | 4,502 | 37% | |
| Conservative gain from Liberal | | Swing | | |

=== Central, Everton, Netherfield ===
Central, Everton, Netherfield
| Party | Candidate | Votes | % | ±% |
|---|---|---|---|---|
| Labour | J. Parry * | 1,414 | 52% | −14% |
| Liberal | Cathy Hancox | 976 | 36% | +21% |
| Conservative | J. B. King | 319 | 12% | −7% |
| Majority | | 438 | | |
| Registered electors | | 11,812 | | |
| Turnout | | 2,709 | 23% | |
| Labour hold | | Swing | | |

=== Childwall ===
Childwall
| Party | Candidate | Votes | % | ±% |
|---|---|---|---|---|
| Conservative | S. Airey | 4,263 | 62% | +24% |
| Labour | J. E. Roberts | 1,365 | 20% | +9% |
| Liberal | A. M. Loughney ^{(PARTY)} | 1,253 | 18% | −32% |
| Majority | | 2,898 | | |
| Registered electors | | 20,285 | | |
| Turnout | | 6,881 | 34% | |
| Conservative gain from Liberal | | Swing | | |

=== Church ===
Church
| Party | Candidate | Votes | % | ±% |
|---|---|---|---|---|
| Liberal | Cyril Carr * | 2,870 | 45% | −17% |
| Conservative | R. F. Symington | 2,837 | 45% | +13% |
| Labour | M. J. Smith | 654 | 10% | +5% |
| Majority | | 33 | | |
| Registered electors | | 14,954 | | |
| Turnout | | 6,361 | 43% | |
| Liberal hold | | Swing | | |

=== Clubmoor ===
Clubmoor
| Party | Candidate | Votes | % | ±% |
|---|---|---|---|---|
| Labour | A. Gamble | 1,333 | 36% | +3% |
| Liberal | John Bowen * | 1,177 | 32% | −13% |
| Conservative | W. Scott | 1,156 | 32% | +10% |
| Majority | | 156 | | |
| Registered electors | | 10,630 | | |
| Turnout | | 3,666 | 34% | |
| Labour gain from Liberal | | Swing | | |

=== County ===
County
| Party | Candidate | Votes | % | ±% |
|---|---|---|---|---|
| Liberal | Neil T. Cardwell | 1,805 | 42% | +15% |
| Labour | J. McLean * | 1,333 | 31% | −13% |
| Conservative | R. J. Keney | 1,175 | 27% | −2% |
| Majority | | 472 | | |
| Registered electors | | 11,911 | | |
| Turnout | | 4,313 | 36% | |
| Liberal gain from Labour | | Swing | | |

=== Croxteth ===
Croxteth
| Party | Candidate | Votes | % | ±% |
|---|---|---|---|---|
| Conservative | E. H. Fitzpatrick | 2,720 | 56% | +26% |
| Liberal | E. M. Clews ^{(PARTY)} | 1,164 | 24% | −34% |
| Labour | W. F. Burke | 942 | 20% | +8% |
| Majority | | 1,556 | | |
| Registered electors | | 12,525 | | |
| Turnout | | 4,826 | 39% | |
| Conservative gain from Liberal | | Swing | | |

=== Dingle ===
Dingle
| Party | Candidate | Votes | % | ±% |
|---|---|---|---|---|
| Labour | M. Evans * | 1,105 | 62% | −2% |
| Conservative | J. A. Watson | 541 | 31% | +15% |
| Liberal | G. Temmee | 123 | 7% | −8% |
| Majority | | 564 | | |
| Registered electors | | 7,462 | | |
| Turnout | | 1,769 | 24% | |
| Labour hold | | Swing | | |

=== Dovecot ===
Dovecot
| Party | Candidate | Votes | % | ±% |
|---|---|---|---|---|
| Labour | E. Burke * | 2,379 | 50% | |
| Conservative | J. F. McMillan | 1,411 | 29% | |
| Liberal | B. Morris | 995 | 21% | |
| Majority | | 968 | | |
| Registered electors | | 16,539 | | |
| Turnout | | 4,785 | 29% | |
| Labour hold | | Swing | | |

=== Fairfield ===
Fairfield
| Party | Candidate | Votes | % | ±% |
|---|---|---|---|---|
| Liberal | Graham Hulme ^{(PARTY)} | 1,684 | 50% | |
| Conservative | N. Wilkinson | 834 | 25% | |
| Labour | F. Gaier | 735 | 22% | |
| Socialist Workers | A. S. Meehan | 102 | 3% | |
| Majority | | 850 | | |
| Registered electors | | 10,951 | | |
| Turnout | | 3,355 | 31% | |
| Liberal hold | | Swing | | |

=== Fazakerley ===
Fazakerley
| Party | Candidate | Votes | % | ±% |
|---|---|---|---|---|
| Conservative | A. Brown | 1,655 | 42% | |
| Labour | A. Williams | 1,634 | 41% | |
| Liberal | R. J. Cunningham | 664 | 17% | |
| Majority | | 21 | | |
| Registered electors | | 11,677 | | |
| Turnout | | 3,953 | 34% | |
| Conservative gain from Labour | | Swing | | |

=== Gillmoss ===
Gillmoss 2 seats
| Party | Candidate | Votes | % | ±% |
|---|---|---|---|---|
| Labour | E. D. Roderick ^{(PARTY)} | 2,554 | 56% | |
| Labour | P. J. Murphy | 2,372 | 52% | |
| Conservative | A. Gore | 1,153 | 25% | |
| Conservative | F. M. Kennedy | 1,107 | 24% | |
| Liberal | E. Carroll | 839 | 18% | |
| Liberal | J. Palfreyman | 338 | 7% | |
| Majority | | 1,401 | | |
| Registered electors | | 19,245 | | |
| Turnout | | 4,546 | 24% | |
| Labour hold | | Swing | | |

=== Granby, Prince's Park ===
Granby, Prince's Park
| Party | Candidate | Votes | % | ±% |
|---|---|---|---|---|
| Labour | Dr Cyril Taylor * | 2,110 | 60% | −6% |
| Liberal | Arthur Eric Damsell | 447 | 13% | |
| Conservative | O. Y. Hughes | 829 | 24% | −3% |
| Communist | E. Caddick | 103 | 3% | |
| Socialist Unity | E. P. Finnerty | 92 | 3% | |
| Workers Revolutionary | W. Hunter | 39 | 1% | |
| Immigrant Party | J. P. Murphy | 23 | 1% | |
| Majority | | 1,281 | | |
| Registered electors | | 12,903 | | |
| Turnout | | 3,489 | 27% | |
| Labour hold | | Swing | | |

=== Kensington ===
Kensington
| Party | Candidate | Votes | % | ±% |
|---|---|---|---|---|
| Liberal | John R. Watton * | 1,582 | 68% | |
| Labour | J. H. Stamper | 443 | 19% | |
| Conservative | R. H. Mather | 310 | 13% | |
| Majority | | 1,139 | | |
| Registered electors | | 6,420 | | |
| Turnout | | 2,335 | 36% | |
| Liberal hold | | Swing | | |

=== Low Hill, Smithdown ===
Low Hill, Smithdown
| Party | Candidate | Votes | % | ±% |
|---|---|---|---|---|
| Liberal | David Alton * | 2,166 | 67% | −3% |
| Liberal | A. Clitherow ^{(PARTY)} | 1,789 | 55% | −15% |
| Labour | L. Gallagher | 825 | 26% | +2% |
| Labour | G. G. Pratt | 547 | 17% | −7% |
| Conservative | R. Meadows | 241 | 7% | +1% |
| Conservative | M. F. Meehan | 174 | 5% | −1% |
| Majority | | 1,341 | | |
| Registered electors | | 8,425 | | |
| Turnout | | 3,232 | 38% | |
| Liberal hold | | Swing | | |
| Liberal hold | | Swing | | |

=== Melrose, Westminster ===
Melrose, Westminster
| Party | Candidate | Votes | % | ±% |
|---|---|---|---|---|
| Labour | F. J. Molloy ^{(PARTY)} | 1,307 | 47% | −16% |
| Liberal | J. Bradley | 1,265 | 45% | +32% |
| Conservative | E. M. Clein | 222 | 8% | −5% |
| Majority | | 42 | | |
| Registered electors | | 7,896 | | |
| Turnout | | 2,794 | 35% | |
| Labour hold | | Swing | | |

=== Old Swan ===
Old Swan
| Party | Candidate | Votes | % | ±% |
|---|---|---|---|---|
| Liberal | Doreen Jones | 1,746 | 42% | |
| Conservative | I. McFall | 1,410 | 34% | |
| Labour | D. E. Krumbein | 947 | 23% | |
| Communist | H. Mohin | 83 | 2% | |
| Independent Liberal | W. J. McCullough | 112 | 3% | |
| Majority | | 336 | | |
| Registered electors | | 12,614 | | |
| Turnout | | 4,186 | 33% | |
| Liberal hold | | Swing | | |

=== Picton ===
Picton
| Party | Candidate | Votes | % | ±% |
|---|---|---|---|---|
| Liberal | Pam A. Bradley ^{(PARTY)} | 2,051 | 46% | |
| Labour | J. Hughes | 1,345 | 30% | |
| Conservative | J. McDermott | 955 | 22% | |
| Communist | J. G. Volleamere | 60 | 1% | |
| Majority | | 706 | | |
| Registered electors | | 11,280 | | |
| Turnout | | 4,411 | 39% | |
| Liberal hold | | Swing | | |

=== Pirrie ===
Pirrie
| Party | Candidate | Votes | % | ±% |
|---|---|---|---|---|
| Labour | H. Dalton * | 2,815 | 57% | −10% |
| Conservative | W. T. Palmer | 1,739 | 35% | +2% |
| Liberal | J. Stephenson | 359 | 7% | |
| Majority | | 1,076 | | |
| Registered electors | | 15,937 | | |
| Turnout | | 4,913 | 31% | |
| Labour hold | | Swing | | |

=== St. Mary's ===
St. Mary's
| Party | Candidate | Votes | % | ±% |
|---|---|---|---|---|
| Labour | S. R. Maddox * | 1,309 | 47% | |
| Conservative | R. A. Parkes | 1,094 | 39% | |
| Liberal | C. J. Lister | 372 | 13% | |
| Majority | | 215 | | |
| Registered electors | | 9,474 | | |
| Turnout | | 2,775 | 29% | |
| Labour hold | | Swing | | |

=== St. Michael's ===
St. Michael's
| Party | Candidate | Votes | % | ±% |
|---|---|---|---|---|
| Liberal | Trevor Jones * | 1,897 | 54% | |
| Conservative | J. Cheshire | 1,017 | 29% | |
| Labour | D. R. Leach | 616 | 17% | |
| Majority | | 880 | | |
| Registered electors | | 9,645 | | |
| Turnout | | 3,530 | 37% | |
| Liberal hold | | Swing | | |

=== Sandhills, Vauxhall ===
Sandhills, Vauxhall
| Party | Candidate | Votes | % | ±% |
|---|---|---|---|---|
| Labour | Paul Orr * | 1,783 | 78% | |
| Socialist Unity | A. Thompson | 281 | 12% | |
| Conservative | D. J. Lewis | 173 | 8% | |
| Liberal | M. Decker | 56 | 2% | |
| Majority | | 1,502 | | |
| Registered electors | | 9,015 | | |
| Turnout | | 2,293 | 25% | |
| Labour hold | | Swing | | |

=== Speke ===
Speke
| Party | Candidate | Votes | % | ±% |
|---|---|---|---|---|
| Labour | G. J. Maudsley * | 1,878 | 61% | |
| Conservative | C. W. Harpin | 983 | 32% | |
| Liberal | I. McGuiness | 134 | 4% | |
| Independent Labour | P. Moorhead | 105 | 3% | |
| Majority | | 895 | | |
| Registered electors | | 14,188 | | |
| Turnout | | 3,100 | 22% | |
| Labour hold | | Swing | | |

=== Tuebrook ===
Tuebrook
| Party | Candidate | Votes | % | ±% |
|---|---|---|---|---|
| Conservative | J. Irving | 1,541 | 38% | +14% |
| Labour | Derek Hatton | 1,450 | 36% | +6% |
| Liberal | C. Collins ^{(PARTY)} | 1,057 | 26% | −17% |
| Majority | | 91 | | |
| Registered electors | | 11,240 | | |
| Turnout | | 4,048 | 36% | |
| Conservative gain from Liberal | | Swing | | |

=== Warbreck ===
Warbreck
| Party | Candidate | Votes | % | ±% |
|---|---|---|---|---|
| Conservative | R. B. Flude * | 1,781 | 45% | −8% |
| Liberal | E. J. Seddon | 1,170 | 30% | |
| Labour | W. H. Roberts | 1,009 | 25% | −22% |
| Majority | | 611 | | |
| Registered electors | | 11,722 | | |
| Turnout | | 3,960 | 34% | |
| Conservative hold | | Swing | | |

=== Woolton, East ===
Woolton, East
| Party | Candidate | Votes | % | ±% |
|---|---|---|---|---|
| Labour | H. Bryers ^{(PARTY)} | 2,080 | 57% | |
| Conservative | S. Fitzsimmons | 1,204 | 33% | |
| Liberal | R. F. Heywood | 359 | 10% | |
| Majority | | 876 | | |
| Registered electors | | 13,607 | | |
| Turnout | | 3,643 | 27% | |
| Labour hold | | Swing | | |

=== Woolton, West ===
Woolton, West
| Party | Candidate | Votes | % | ±% |
|---|---|---|---|---|
| Conservative | Ruth Dean | 5,011 | 74% | |
| Labour | J. M. Lyon | 1,135 | 17% | |
| Liberal | J. E. Parry | 635 | 9% | |
| Majority | | 3,876 | | |
| Registered electors | | 17,820 | | |
| Turnout | | 6,781 | 38% | |
| Conservative hold | | Swing | | |
