= 1984 Liverpool City Council election =

UK local government election

- 3 May 1984

34 of 99 seats to Liverpool City Council
	First party	Second party
Leader			Derek Hatton
Party	Labour	Liberal
Leader's seat
Last election	51	30
Seats before	51	30
Seats after	58	28
Seat change	▲7	▼2
Popular vote	90,219	67,234
Percentage	46%	35%
	Third party	Fourth party
Party	Conservative	Communist
Leader's seat
Last election	18	0
Seats before	18	0
Seats after	17	0
Seat change	▼1	0
Popular vote	37,055	250
Percentage	19%	0.1%
Swing

Elections to Liverpool City Council were held on 3 May 1984. One third of the council was up for election and the Labour Party retained overall control of the council.

This election was during the time the far left trotskyist entryist group within the Labour Party called the Militant Tendency had significant influence on the council, they had 16 out of the 58 councillors on the council.

After the election, the composition of the council was:

Composition of Liverpool City Council after 1984, with Militant tendency in dark red

Party	Seats	±
Labour	58	+7
Liberal	28	-2
Conservative	17	-1

== Abercromby ==
Abercromby
Party	Candidate	Votes	%	±%
Labour	J. A. Devaney	2,739	80%	
Liberal	C. J. Leahy	350	10%	
Conservative	H. V. Tracy-Forster	252	7%	
Communist	F. Carroll	92	3%	
Majority		2,389		
Registered electors		8,960		
Turnout		3,433	38%	
Labour hold		Swing		

== Aigburth ==
Aigburth
Party	Candidate	Votes	%	±%
Liberal	Cathy Hancox	3,683	53%	
Labour	J. D. Williams	1,901	27%	
Conservative	J. Mass	1,329	19%	
Majority		2,389		
Registered electors		13,502		
Turnout		6,913	51%	
Liberal hold		Swing		

== Allerton ==
Allerton
Party	Candidate	Votes	%	±%
Conservative	Sheila Craine	3,446	50%	
SDP	W. M. Scott	1,783	26%	
Labour	Dawn Booth	1,609	24%	
Majority		1,663		
Registered electors		12,717		
Turnout		6,838	54%	

== Anfield ==
Anfield
Party	Candidate	Votes	%	±%
Labour	Jacqueline Crowley	2,870	43%	
Liberal	R. Johnston	2,553	38%	
Conservative	Myrna Fitzsimmons	1,308	19%	
Majority		317		
Registered electors		12,540		
Turnout		6,731	54%	

== Arundel ==
Arundel
Party	Candidate	Votes	%	±%
Liberal	S. J. Hicks	2,404	43%	
Labour	M. V. Roberts	2,334	42%	
Conservative	H. M. Rigby	815	15%	
Communist	J. C. Blevin	63	1%	
Majority		70		
Registered electors		12,114		
Turnout		5,616	46%	

== Breckfield ==
Breckfield
Party	Candidate	Votes	%	±%
Labour	S. J. Ellison	2,911	50%	
Liberal	D. M. B. Crofts	2,699	46%	
Conservative	A. Brill	208	4%	
Majority		212		
Registered electors		11,508		
Turnout		5,818	51%	

== Broadgreen ==
Broadgreen
Party	Candidate	Votes	%	±%
Liberal	Rosemary Cooper	3,500	48%	
Labour	R. Quinn	2,982	41%	
Conservative	S. Fitzsimmons	756	10%	
Majority		518		
Registered electors		13,532		
Turnout		7,238	53%	

== Childwall ==
Childwall
Party	Candidate	Votes	%	±%
Liberal	Eddie Clein	3,694	48%	
Conservative	W. A. N. Fearenside	2,581	34%	
Labour	D. J. Phillips	1,429	19%	
Majority		1,113		
Registered electors		13,718		
Turnout		7,704	56%	

== Church ==
Church
Party	Candidate	Votes	%	±%
Liberal	Mike Storey	4,306	50%	
Conservative	R. F. Symington	2,656	31%	
Labour	P. J. Thompson	1,661	19%	
Majority		1,650		
Registered electors		14,897		
Turnout		8,623	58%	

== Clubmoor ==
Clubmoor
Party	Candidate	Votes	%	±%
Labour	W. Lafferty	4,050	60%	
SDP	J. P. Prince	1,693	25%	
Conservative	A. G. Wilson	1,002	15%	
Majority		2,357		
Registered electors		13,926		
Turnout		6,745	48%	

== County ==
County
Party	Candidate	Votes	%	±%
Liberal	Paul Clark	3,932	54%	
Labour	M. P. Bolland	2,971	40%	
Conservative	C. P. Loller	439	6%	
Majority		961		
Registered electors		12,973		
Turnout		7,342	57%	

== Croxteth ==
Croxteth
Party	Candidate	Votes	%	±%
Conservative	G. E. Brandwood	3,413	47%	
Labour	Frank Vaudrey	2,299	31%	
SDP	S. F. Jacobs	1,603	22%	
Majority		1,114		
Registered electors		13,703		
Turnout		7,315	53%	

== Dingle ==
Dingle
Party	Candidate	Votes	%	±%
Labour	P. Ferguson	3,095	52%	
Liberal	Richard Kemp	2,339	39%	
Conservative	D. W. Patmore	462	8%	
Communist	J. Cook	30	1%	
Majority		756		
Registered electors		11,453		
Turnout		5,926	52%	

== Dovecot ==
Dovecot
Party	Candidate	Votes	%	±%
Labour	E. Burke	3,454	70%	
Conservative	J. F. MacMillan	849	17%	
Liberal	C. Mayes	654	13%	
Majority		2,605		
Registered electors		11,965		
Turnout		4,957	41%	

== Everton ==
Everton
Party	Candidate	Votes	%	±%
Labour	J. Parry	3,186	87%	
Conservative	C. Freemantle	282	8%	
Liberal	J. P. Murray	213	6%	
Majority		2,904		
Registered electors		9,290		
Turnout		3,681	40%	

== Fazakerley ==
Fazakerley
Party	Candidate	Votes	%	±%
Labour	D. J. Lloyd	3,293	60%	
Conservative	A. Brown	1,091	20%	
SDP	S. D. Jones	1,080	20%	
Majority		2,202		
Registered electors		11,448		
Turnout		5,464	48%	

== Gillmoss ==
Gillmoss
Party	Candidate	Votes	%	±%
Labour	A. L. Rimmer	3,836	77%	
Conservative	P. C. Ferris	634	13%	
SDP	B. Coleman	490	10%	
Majority		3,202		
Registered electors		11,927		
Turnout		4,960	42%	

== Granby ==
Granby
Party	Candidate	Votes	%	±%
Labour	Alex Doswell	2,715	56%	
Liberal	Arthur Eric Damsell	1,890	39%	
Conservative	D. N. Gillott	187	4%	
Communist	E. F. Caddick	65	1%	
Majority		825		
Registered electors		10,350		
Turnout		4,857	47%	

== Grassendale ==
Grassendale
Party	Candidate	Votes	%	±%
Liberal	J. C. Greenwood	4,221	55%	
Conservative	J. H. Lea	2,511	33%	
Labour	S. D. Flemming	958	12%	
Majority		1,710		
Registered electors		12,313		
Turnout		7,690	62%	

== Kensington ==
Kensington
Party	Candidate	Votes	%	±%
Labour	A. D. Fogg	3,001	49%	
Liberal	Frank Doran	2,679	44%	
Conservative	T. Caulfield	422	7%	
Majority		322		
Registered electors		12,600		
Turnout		6,102	48%	

== Melrose ==
Melrose
Party	Candidate	Votes	%	±%
Labour	V. J. Wagner	3,303	58%	
Liberal	David Vasmer	2,116	37%	
Conservative	Angela Oliver	246	4%	
Majority		1,187		
Registered electors		11,779		
Turnout		5,665	48%	

== Netherley ==
Netherley
Party	Candidate	Votes	%	±%
Labour	W. Harper	2,566	72%	
SDP	Ian Phillips	580	16%	
Conservative	Ann Nugent	431	12%	
Majority		1,986		
Registered electors		7,730		
Turnout		3,577	46%	

== Old Swan ==
Old Swan
Party	Candidate	Votes	%	±%
Labour	P. J. Lloyd	3,126	51%	
Liberal	J. Rossington	2,136	35%	
Conservative	Pauline Dougherty	887	14%	
Majority		990		
Registered electors		11,989		
Turnout		6,149	51%	

== Picton ==
Picton
Party	Candidate	Votes	%	±%
Liberal	Pamela Bradley	3,569	56%	
Labour	A. C. Snowden	2,391	37%	
Conservative	S. M. Sugden	419	7%	
Majority		1,178		
Registered electors		11,626		
Turnout		6,379	55%	

== Pirrie ==
Pirrie
Party	Candidate	Votes	%	±%
Labour	H. Dalton	3,949	70%	
Conservative	M. Kingston	880	16%	
SDP	D. Stephenson	804	14%	
Majority		3,069		
Registered electors		12,242		
Turnout		5,633	46%	

== St. Mary's ==
St. Mary's
Party	Candidate	Votes	%	±%
Labour	A. Mulhearn	2,972	51%	
Liberal	M. N. Bestel	2,149	37%	
Conservative	M. S. Gill	727	12%	
Majority		823		
Registered electors		11,613		
Turnout		5,848	50%	

== Smithdown ==
Smithdown
Party	Candidate	Votes	%	±%
Labour	Dorothy Matthews	2,884	59%	
Liberal	Anne Clitherow	1,810	37%	
Conservative	S. J. Melia	173	4%	
Majority		1,074		
Registered electors		10,331		
Turnout		4,867	47%	

== Speke ==
Speke 2 seats
Party	Candidate	Votes	%	±%
Labour	J. Ord	3,607	80%	
Labour	F. M. Dowling	3,543	79%	
Liberal	J. D. Ball	466	10%	
Liberal	Katherine Watson	405	10%	
Conservative	C. W. Harpin	427	9%	
Conservative	K. G. Watkin	363	8%	
Majority		3,141		
Registered electors		9,715		
Turnout		4,500	46%	

== Tuebrook ==
Tuebrook
Party	Candidate	Votes	%	±%
Liberal	Steve R. Radford	3,492	53%	
Labour	J. E. Roberts	2,412	36%	
Conservative	J. Irving	706	11%	
Majority		1,080		
Registered electors		12,419		
Turnout		6,610	53%	

== Valley ==
Valley
Party	Candidate	Votes	%	±%
Labour	H. Smith	2,961	63%	
Conservative	S. R. Marsden	1,054	22%	
Liberal	Veronica Best	688	15%	
Majority		1,907		
Registered electors		9,778		
Turnout		4,703	48%	

== Vauxhall ==
Vauxhall
Party	Candidate	Votes	%	±%
Labour	Paul Orr	3,031	94%	
Conservative	H. W. Drohan	208	6%	
Majority		2,823		
Registered electors		8,038		
Turnout		2,823	40%	

== Warbreck ==
Warbreck
Party	Candidate	Votes	%	±%
Liberal	Elsie Lang	2,707	40%	
Labour	T. A. Prout	2,515	37%	
Conservative	R. Gould	1,558	23%	
Majority		192		
Registered electors		13,914		
Turnout		6,780	49%	

== Woolton ==
Woolton
Party	Candidate	Votes	%	±%
Conservative	Ruth Dean	4,696	69%	
Labour	R. J. Lafferty	1,208	18%	
Liberal	D. E. Huish	951	14%	
Majority		3,488		
Registered electors		12,857		
Turnout		3,488	53%	
