= 1983 Liverpool City Council election =

1983 UK local government election

- 5 May 1983

35 seats were up for election (one third): one seat for each of the 33 wards, plus 2 by-elections, one for Fazakerley and one for Melrose 50 seats needed for a majority

Elections to Liverpool City Council were held on 5 May 1983. One third of the council was up for election and the Labour Party gained overall control of the council following it previously being under no overall control.

After the election, the composition of the council was:

| Party | Seats | ± |
|---|---|---|
| Labour | 51 | +9 |
| Liberal | 30 | -6 |
| Conservative | 18 | -1 |

== Election result ==
Liverpool local election result 1983
| Party | Seats | Gains | Losses | Net gain/loss | Seats % | Votes % | Votes | +/− |
|---|---|---|---|---|---|---|---|---|
| Labour | 23 | +9 | 0 | +9 | 69% | 47% | 76,176 | |
| Liberal | 9 | +2 | -8 | -6 | 27% | 29% | 47,021 | |
| Conservative | 3 | 0 | -3 | -3 | 9% | 21% | 34,363 | |
| SDP | 0 | 0 | -2 | -2 | 0% | 3% | 4,306 | |
| Communist | 0 | | | | 0% | 0.3% | 456 | |
| Independent | 0 | | | | 0% | 0.04% | 73 | |

== Ward results ==
=== Abercromby ===
Abercromby
| Party | Candidate | Votes | % | ±% |
|---|---|---|---|---|
| Labour | J. Rutledge | 2,010 | 74% | |
| Liberal | C. J. Leahy | 371 | 14% | |
| Conservative | H. V. Tracy-Forster | 237 | 9% | |
| Communist | F. Carroll | 111 | 4% | |
| Majority | | 1,773 | | |
| Registered electors | | 9,370 | | |
| Turnout | | 2,729 | 29% | |

=== Aigburth ===
Aigburth
| Party | Candidate | Votes | % | ±% |
|---|---|---|---|---|
| Liberal | Trevor Jones | 2,624 | 46% | |
| Labour | J. D. Williams | 1,591 | 28% | |
| Conservative | J. Mass | 1,522 | 27% | |
| Majority | | 1,033 | | |
| Registered electors | | 13,755 | | |
| Turnout | | 5,737 | 42% | |

=== Allerton ===
Allerton
| Party | Candidate | Votes | % | ±% |
|---|---|---|---|---|
| Conservative | J. S. Ross | 3,092 | 57% | |
| Labour | A. J. R. Scott-Samuel | 1,565 | 29% | |
| SDP | W. M. Scott | 812 | 15% | |
| Majority | | 1,527 | | |
| Registered electors | | 12,752 | | |
| Turnout | | 5,469 | 43% | |

=== Anfield ===
Anfield
| Party | Candidate | Votes | % | ±% |
|---|---|---|---|---|
| Liberal | P. V. Downes | 2,322 | 42% | |
| Labour | J. E. Roberts | 2,188 | 40% | |
| Conservative | A. Nugent | 988 | 18% | |
| Majority | | 134 | | |
| Registered electors | | 12,672 | | |
| Turnout | | 5,498 | 43% | |

=== Arundel ===
Arundel
| Party | Candidate | Votes | % | ±% |
|---|---|---|---|---|
| Labour | J. Lyon-Taylor | 2,075 | 40% | |
| Liberal | S. Hicks | 2,016 | 38% | |
| Conservative | H. M. Rigby | 984 | 19% | |
| SDP | G. Endicott | 106 | 2% | |
| Communist | J. C. Blevin | 63 | 1% | |
| Majority | | 59 | | |
| Registered electors | | 12,262 | | |
| Turnout | | 5,244 | 43% | |

=== Breckfield ===
Breckfield
| Party | Candidate | Votes | % | ±% |
|---|---|---|---|---|
| Labour | J. McIntosh | 2,296 | 48% | |
| Liberal | Jimmy Kendrick | 2,189 | 46% | |
| Conservative | W. D. Henry | 253 | 5% | |
| Majority | | 107 | | |
| Registered electors | | 11,720 | | |
| Turnout | | 4,738 | 40% | |

=== Broadgreen ===
Broadgreen
| Party | Candidate | Votes | % | ±% |
|---|---|---|---|---|
| Labour | J. L. Dillon | 2,599 | 44% | |
| Liberal | I. Ilkin | 2,118 | 36% | |
| Conservative | S. Fitzsimmons | 1,219 | 21% | |
| Majority | | 481 | | |
| Registered electors | | 13,599 | | |
| Turnout | | 5,936 | 44% | |

=== Childwall ===
Childwall
| Party | Candidate | Votes | % | ±% |
|---|---|---|---|---|
| Liberal | Neville Gordon Chinn | 2,663 | 41% | |
| Conservative | M. Kingston | 2,444 | 38% | |
| Labour | P. Kinsella | 1,323 | 21% | |
| Majority | | 189 | | |
| Registered electors | | 13,704 | | |
| Turnout | | 6,400 | 47% | |

=== Church ===
Church
| Party | Candidate | Votes | % | ±% |
|---|---|---|---|---|
| Liberal | E. M. Brash | 3,726 | 51% | |
| Conservative | T. P. Pink | 2,409 | 33% | |
| Labour | S. D. Fleming | 1,241 | 17% | |
| Majority | | 1,317 | | |
| Registered electors | | 14,934 | | |
| Turnout | | 7,376 | 49% | |

=== Clubmoor ===
Clubmoor
| Party | Candidate | Votes | % | ±% |
|---|---|---|---|---|
| Labour | W. P. Lafferty | 3,651 | 61% | |
| Liberal | W. F. Burke | 1,423 | 24% | |
| Conservative | S. Hicklin | 877 | 15% | |
| Majority | | 2,228 | | |
| Registered electors | | 13,597 | | |
| Turnout | | 5,951 | 44% | |

=== County ===
County
| Party | Candidate | Votes | % | ±% |
|---|---|---|---|---|
| Labour | F. Mills | 2,542 | 44% | |
| Liberal | N. T. Cardwell | 2,370 | 41% | |
| Conservative | R. Hughes | 816 | 14% | |
| Majority | | 172 | | |
| Registered electors | | 13,071 | | |
| Turnout | | 5,801 | 44% | |

=== Croxteth ===
Croxteth
| Party | Candidate | Votes | % | ±% |
|---|---|---|---|---|
| Conservative | F. R. Butler | 2,845 | 50% | |
| Labour | A. Dunford | 2,022 | 36% | |
| SDP | E. Gurny | 777 | 14% | |
| Majority | | 823 | | |
| Registered electors | | 13,746 | | |
| Turnout | | 5,644 | 41% | |

=== Dingle ===
Dingle
| Party | Candidate | Votes | % | ±% |
|---|---|---|---|---|
| Labour | J. Clarke | 2,917 | 55% | |
| Liberal | C. Collins | 1,810 | 34% | |
| Conservative | D. W. Patmore | 532 | 10% | |
| Communist | J. Cook | 44 | 1% | |
| Majority | | 1,107 | | |
| Registered electors | | 11,690 | | |
| Turnout | | 5,303 | 45% | |

=== Dovecot ===
Dovecot
| Party | Candidate | Votes | % | ±% |
|---|---|---|---|---|
| Labour | W. P. Johnson | 3,202 | 74% | |
| Conservative | R. J. A. Globe | 768 | 18% | |
| SDP | H. Weaver | 341 | 8% | |
| Majority | | 2,434 | | |
| Registered electors | | 11,912 | | |
| Turnout | | 4,311 | 36% | |

=== Everton ===
Everton
| Party | Candidate | Votes | % | ±% |
|---|---|---|---|---|
| Labour | D. Brady | 2,449 | 85% | |
| Conservative | P. M. Pedley | 215 | 7% | |
| Liberal | A. Williams | 171 | 6% | |
| Communist | J. Kay | 36 | 1% | |
| Majority | | 2,234 | | |
| Registered electors | | 9,673 | | |
| Turnout | | 2,871 | 30% | |

=== Fazakerley ===
Fazakerley 2 seats
| Party | Candidate | Votes | % | ±% |
|---|---|---|---|---|
| Labour | J. Nelson | 2,860 | 63% | |
| Labour | J. L. Linden | 2,807 | 62% | |
| Conservative | A. Brown | 1,113 | 25% | |
| Conservative | J. H. Brash | 1.002 | 22% | |
| SDP | J. P. Prince | 544 | 12% | |
| SDP | S. D. Jones | 503 | 11% | |
| Majority | | 1,747 | | |
| Registered electors | | 11,496 | | |
| Turnout | | 4,517 | 39% | |

=== Gillmoss ===
Gillmoss
| Party | Candidate | Votes | % | ±% |
|---|---|---|---|---|
| Labour | P. J. Murphy | 2,887 | 75% | |
| Conservative | A. Gore | 493 | 13% | |
| SDP | P. J. Kellett | 472 | 12% | |
| Majority | | 2,394 | | |
| Registered electors | | 11,878 | | |
| Turnout | | 3,852 | 32% | |

=== Granby ===
Granby
| Party | Candidate | Votes | % | ±% |
|---|---|---|---|---|
| Labour | J. D. Hamilton | 2,360 | 52% | |
| Liberal | Arthur Damsell | 1,827 | 40% | |
| Conservative | D. N. Gillott | 264 | 6% | |
| Communist | E. F. Caddick | 69 | 2% | |
| SDP | Flo Clucas | 40 | 1% | |
| Majority | | 533 | | |
| Registered electors | | 10,618 | | |
| Turnout | | 4,560 | 43% | |

=== Grassendale ===
Grassendale
| Party | Candidate | Votes | % | ±% |
|---|---|---|---|---|
| Liberal | Gerard Scott | 3,368 | 51% | |
| Conservative | J. Bennett | 2,324 | 35% | |
| Labour | E. A. Taylor | 783 | 12% | |
| SDP | R. Isaacson | 174 | 3% | |
| Majority | | 1,044 | | |
| Registered electors | | 12,347 | | |
| Turnout | | 6,649 | 54% | |

=== Kensington ===
Kensington
| Party | Candidate | Votes | % | ±% |
|---|---|---|---|---|
| Liberal | Graham Hulme | 2,182 | 45% | |
| Labour | A. D. Fogg | 2,158 | 45% | |
| Conservative | T. N. Teppett | 496 | 10% | |
| Majority | | 24 | | |
| Registered electors | | 12,680 | | |
| Turnout | | 4,836 | 38% | |

=== Melrose ===
Melrose 2 seats
| Party | Candidate | Votes | % | ±% |
|---|---|---|---|---|
| Labour | R. P. Lancaster | 2,677 | 55% | |
| Labour | P. A. Dunlop | 2,580 | 53% | |
| Liberal | Kevin Sewill | 1,868 | 39% | |
| Liberal | David Vasmer | 1,776 | 37% | |
| Conservative | D. M. Cooper | 217 | 4% | |
| Conservative | C. Cooper | 215 | 4% | |
| SDP | T. McDonald | 75 | 1.6% | |
| SDP | J. Diamond | 72 | 1.5% | |
| Majority | | 809 | | |
| Registered electors | | 11,379 | | |
| Turnout | | 4,835 | 42% | |

=== Netherley ===
Netherley
| Party | Candidate | Votes | % | ±% |
|---|---|---|---|---|
| Labour | Derek Hatton | 2,619 | 78% | |
| Conservative | A. Benfield | 438 | 13% | |
| SDP | Ian Phillips | 307 | 9% | |
| Majority | | 2,181 | | |
| Registered electors | | 8,049 | | |
| Turnout | | 3,364 | 42% | |

=== Old Swan ===
Old Swan
| Party | Candidate | Votes | % | ±% |
|---|---|---|---|---|
| Labour | G. Lloyd | 2,662 | 45% | |
| Liberal | J. Smith | 2,403 | 41% | |
| Conservative | J. L. D. Dowling | 812 | 14% | |
| Majority | | 259 | | |
| Registered electors | | 12,002 | | |
| Turnout | | 5,877 | 49% | |

=== Picton ===
Picton
| Party | Candidate | Votes | % | ±% |
|---|---|---|---|---|
| Liberal | John Bradley | 2,759 | 53% | |
| Labour | J. A. Devaney | 1,898 | 37% | |
| Conservative | B. Keefe | 463 | 9% | |
| Communist | J. G. Volleamere | 69 | 1% | |
| Majority | | 861 | | |
| Registered electors | | 11,725 | | |
| Turnout | | 5,189 | 44% | |

=== Pirrie ===
Pirrie
| Party | Candidate | Votes | % | ±% |
|---|---|---|---|---|
| Labour | M. Black | 3,682 | 76% | |
| Conservative | J. F. Atkinson | 721 | 15% | |
| SDP | D. Stephenson | 454 | 9% | |
| Majority | | 2,961 | | |
| Registered electors | | 12,217 | | |
| Turnout | | 4,857 | 40% | |

=== St. Mary's ===
St. Mary's
| Party | Candidate | Votes | % | ±% |
|---|---|---|---|---|
| Labour | J. Humphries | 2,793 | 56% | |
| Liberal | E. M. Clein | 1,061 | 21% | |
| Conservative | R. A. Parkes | 995 | 20% | |
| SDP | F. S. Roderick | 158 | 3% | |
| Majority | | 1,732 | | |
| Registered electors | | 11,741 | | |
| Turnout | | 5,007 | 43% | |

=== Smithdown ===
Smithdown
| Party | Candidate | Votes | % | ±% |
|---|---|---|---|---|
| Labour | S. M. Jenkins | 2,454 | 54% | |
| Liberal | J. S. Clitherow | 1,964 | 43% | |
| Conservative | B. J. Ardrey | 146 | 3% | |
| Majority | | 490 | | |
| Registered electors | | 10,650 | | |
| Turnout | | 4,564 | 43% | |

=== Speke ===
Speke
| Party | Candidate | Votes | % | ±% |
|---|---|---|---|---|
| Labour | K. Stewart | 2,552 | 78% | |
| Conservative | K. G. Watkin | 436 | 13% | |
| Liberal | J. D. Ball | 285 | 9% | |
| Majority | | 2,116 | | |
| Registered electors | | 9,740 | | |
| Turnout | | 3,273 | 34% | |

=== Tuebrook ===
Tuebrook 2 seats
| Party | Candidate | Votes | % | ±% |
|---|---|---|---|---|
| Liberal | Richard Pine | 2,631 | | |
| Liberal | J. Crawley | 2,482 | 47% | |
| Labour | D. W. Barratt | 1,918 | 36% | |
| Labour | V. J. Wagner | 1,703 | 32% | |
| Conservative | D. Ellis | 728 | 14% | |
| Conservative | F. Oldham | 616 | 12% | |
| Majority | | 713 | | |
| Registered electors | | 12,463 | | |
| Turnout | | 5,277 | 42% | |

=== Valley ===
Valley
| Party | Candidate | Votes | % | ±% |
|---|---|---|---|---|
| Labour | A. J. Byrne | 2,697 | 67% | |
| Conservative | P. C. Stephen | 712 | 18% | |
| Liberal | Ernest Stephenson | 609 | 15% | |
| Majority | | 1,985 | | |
| Registered electors | | 9,916 | | |
| Turnout | | 4,018 | 41% | |

=== Vauxhall ===
Vauxhall
| Party | Candidate | Votes | % | ±% |
|---|---|---|---|---|
| Labour | P. E. Luckock | 2,787 | 89% | |
| Liberal | R. J. Flood | 230 | 7% | |
| Conservative | H. W. Drohan | 115 | 4% | |
| Majority | | 2,557 | | |
| Registered electors | | 8,647 | | |
| Turnout | | 3,132 | 36% | |

=== Warbreck ===
Warbreck
| Party | Candidate | Votes | % | ±% |
|---|---|---|---|---|
| Labour | J. Hackett | 1,982 | 37% | |
| Conservative | R. B. Flude | 1,697 | 31% | |
| Liberal | E. J. Lang | 1,681 | 31% | |
| Communist | K. C. Nelson | 64 | 1% | |
| Majority | | 285 | | |
| Registered electors | | 13,933 | | |
| Turnout | | 5,424 | 39% | |

=== Woolton ===
Woolton
| Party | Candidate | Votes | % | ±% |
|---|---|---|---|---|
| Conservative | A. McVeigh | 3,498 | 66% | |
| Labour | H. G. Kilduff | 1,097 | 21% | |
| Liberal | J. Joyce | 415 | 8% | |
| Majority | | 2,401 | | |
| Registered electors | | 12,790 | | |
| Turnout | | 5,329 | 42% | |
