= 1982 Liverpool City Council election =

1982 UK local government election

- 6 May 1982

33 seats were up for election (one third): one seat for each of the 33 wards plus 2 by-elections 50 seats needed for a majority

Elections to Liverpool City Council were held on 6 May 1982. One third of the council was up for election.

After the election, the composition of the council was:

Party	Seats	±
Labour	42	+2
Liberal	36	-2
Conservative	21	0

== Election result ==
Liverpool local election result 1982
Party	Seats	Gains	Losses	Net gain/loss	Seats %	Votes %	Votes	+/−
Labour	16	4	2	+2	48%	39%	54,780	
Liberal	10	2	4	-2	30%	31%	43,378	
Conservative	7	0	0	0	21%	25%	34,935	
SDP	0				0%	5%	7,181	
Communist	0				0%	0.4%	510	
Independent Liberal	0				0%	0.09%	129	
Ecology	0				0%	0.08%	112	
Workers Revolutionary	0				0%	0.04%	57	

== Ward results ==
=== Abercromby ===
Abercromby
Party	Candidate	Votes	%	±%
Labour	A. Hood	1,648	54%	
Liberal	David Vasmer	1,146	38%	
Communist	R. O'Hara	154	5%	
Conservative	G. A. Powell	100	3%	
Majority		502		
Registered electors		9,757		
Turnout		3,048	31%	

=== Aigburth ===
Aigburth
Party	Candidate	Votes	%	±%
Liberal	Peter Millea	2,462	49%	
Labour	J. Williams	1,526	30%	
Conservative	R. Jones	1,064	21%	
Majority		936		
Registered electors		13,409		
Turnout		5,052	38%	

=== Allerton ===
Allerton
Party	Candidate	Votes	%	±%
Conservative	T. Morrison	2,731	52%	
SDP	R. Isaacson	1,542	29%	
Labour	C. R. Frais	958	18%	
Majority		1,189		
Registered electors		12,769		
Turnout		5,052	38%	

=== Anfield ===
Anfield
Party	Candidate	Votes	%	±%
Liberal	Cathie Kaufman	2,449	48%	
Labour	J. Roberts	1,453	29%	
Conservative	T. P. Pink	1,175	23%	
Majority		996		
Registered electors		12,675		
Turnout		5,077	40%	

=== Arundel ===
Arundel
Party	Candidate	Votes	%	±%
Liberal	Mary Johnston	1,693	39%	
Labour	A. C. Snowden	1,576	36%	
Conservative	Helen Rigby	1,020	23%	
Communist	J. Kay	68	2%	
Majority		117		
Registered electors		12,127		
Turnout		4,357	36%	

=== Breckfield ===
Breckfield
Party	Candidate	Votes	%	±%
Liberal	William Roberts	1,970	47%	
Labour	J. McIntosh	1,777	43%	
Conservative	A. Wilson	429	10%	
Majority		193		
Registered electors		11,592		
Turnout		4,176	36%	

=== Broadgreen ===
Broadgreen
Party	Candidate	Votes	%	±%
Liberal	Geoffrey Smith	2,072	43%	
Labour	E. J. Smith	1,589	33%	
Conservative	S. Fitzsimmons	1,204	23%	
Majority		483		
Registered electors		13,578		
Turnout		4,865	36%	

=== Childwall ===
Childwall
Party	Candidate	Votes	%	±%
Conservative	S. Airey	3,069	53%	
Liberal	Neville Gordon Chinn	1,861	32%	
Labour	Susan Smith	826	14%	
Majority		1,208		
Registered electors		13,683		
Turnout		5,756	42%	

=== Church ===
Church
Party	Candidate	Votes	%	±%
Conservative	Sally Atherton	2,905	44%	
Liberal	Len Tyrer	2,849	43%	
Labour	J. Clarke	922	14%	
Majority		56		
Registered electors		15,073		
Turnout		6,676	44%	

=== Clubmoor ===
Clubmoor
Party	Candidate	Votes	%	±%
Labour	R. B. Gladden	2,413	47%	
Liberal	John Bowen	1,742	34%	
Conservative	S. Hicklin	932	18%	
Majority		671		
Registered electors		14,005		
Turnout		5,087	36%	

=== County ===
County
Party	Candidate	Votes	%	±%
Liberal	Peter J. Rainford	1,988	41%	
Labour	Pauline Dunlop	1,856	38%	
Conservative	R. Hughes	1,000	21%	
Majority		132		
Registered electors		13,190		
Turnout		4,844	37%	

=== Croxteth ===
Croxteth
Party	Candidate	Votes	%	±%
Conservative	E. H. Fitzpatrick	2,558	48%	
SDP	Helen Petrie	1,485	28%	
Labour	J. Mooney	1,296	24%	
Majority		1,073		
Registered electors		13,655		
Turnout		5,339	39%	

=== Dingle ===
Dingle
Party	Candidate	Votes	%	±%
Labour	R. J. Quick	1,839	43%	
Liberal	Charles Collins	1,641	38%	
Conservative	D. W. Patmore	701	16%	
Communist	J. Cook	71	2%	
Workers Revolutionary	J. J. Maginnis	33	1%	
Majority		198		
Registered electors		11,714		
Turnout		4,285	37%	

=== Dovecot ===
Dovecot
Party	Candidate	Votes	%	±%
Labour	W. H. Westbury	2,364	60%	
SDP	E. R. Jones	817	21%	
Conservative	J. L. Walsh	771	20%	
Majority		1,547		
Registered electors		12,016		
Turnout		3,952	33%	

=== Everton ===
Everton
Party	Candidate	Votes	%	±%
Labour	F. Wiles	1,820	81%	
Liberal	R. J. Flood	240	11%	
Conservative	W. Scott	186	8%	
Majority		1,580		
Registered electors		10,014		
Turnout		2,246	22%	

=== Fazakerley ===
Fazakerley
Party	Candidate	Votes	%	±%
Labour	R. C. V. Gregory	2,300	54%	
Liberal	Harold Glyn Rogers	1,035	24%	
Conservative	A. Brown	924	22%	
Majority		1,265		
Registered electors		11,579		
Turnout		4,259	37%	

=== Gillmoss ===
Gillmoss
Party	Candidate	Votes	%	±%
Labour	W. R. Snell	2,138	63%	
SDP	P. J. Kellett	747	22%	
Liberal	J. Mangan	488	14%	
Majority		1,391		
Registered electors		11,962		
Turnout		3,373	28%	

=== Granby ===
Granby
Party	Candidate	Votes	%	±%
Labour	D. R. Leach	1,824	48%	
Liberal	Arthur Eric Damsell	1,550	41%	
Conservative	A. Palin	356	9%	
Communist	S. P. Munby	70	2%	
Workers Revolutionary	T. M. Cooper	24	1%	
Majority		1,754		
Registered electors		10,664		
Turnout		3,824	36%	

=== Grassendale ===
Grassendale
Party	Candidate	Votes	%	±%
Conservative	E. F. Pine	2,741	46%	
Liberal	Gerard Patrick Scott	2,532	43%	
Labour	J. H. Stamper	643	11%	
Majority		279		
Registered electors		12,403		
Turnout		5,916	48%	

=== Kensington ===
Kensington
Party	Candidate	Votes	%	±%
Liberal	Joyce Stephenson	1,670	43%	
Labour	K. D. Radcliffe	1,605	41%	
Conservative	T. N. Teppett	599	15%	
Majority		65		
Registered electors		12,609		
Turnout		3,874	31%	

=== Melrose ===
Melrose
Party	Candidate	Votes	%	±%
Labour	M. Dalling	1,980	51%	
Liberal	Kevin Andrew Sewill	1,582	40%	
Conservative	Pauline Dougherty	353	9%	
Majority		398		
Registered electors		11,325		
Turnout		3,915	35%	

=== Netherley ===
Netherley
Party	Candidate	Votes	%	±%
Labour	Heather Adams	1,869	65%	
SDP	F. S. Roderick	548	19%	
Conservative	Ann Nugent	480	17%	
Majority		1,321		
Registered electors		8,491		
Turnout		2,897	34%	

=== Old Swan ===
Old Swan
Party	Candidate	Votes	%	±%
Liberal	A. Loftus	2,269	43%	
Labour	M. J. Smith	1,868	36%	
Conservative	W, H. Connolly	924	18%	
Independent Liberal	K. McCulloch	129	2%	
Communist	H. Mohin	30	1%	
Majority		401		
Registered electors		12,061		
Turnout		5,220	43%	

=== Picton ===
Picton
Party	Candidate	Votes	%	±%
Liberal	Herbert Herrity	2,296	53%	
Labour	E. A. Taylor	1,359	31%	
Conservative	J. McDermott	603	14%	
Communist	J. G. Volleamere	69	2%	
Majority		937		
Registered electors		11,767		
Turnout		4,327	37%	

=== Pirrie ===
Pirrie
Party	Candidate	Votes	%	±%
Labour	P. Owens	2,569	65%	
Conservative	Christine Perkins	706	18%	
SDP	Flo Clucas	684	17%	
Majority		1,885		
Registered electors		12,370		
Turnout		3,959	32%	

=== St. Mary's ===
St. Mary's
Party	Candidate	Votes	%	±%
Labour	R. C. Evans	1,979	50%	
Conservative	C. J. Lister	1,144	29%	
Liberal	J. Ball	823	21%	
Communist	M. McLoughlin	48	1%	
Majority		835		
Registered electors		12,013		
Turnout		3,994	33%	

=== Smithdown ===
Smithdown
Party	Candidate	Votes	%	±%
Labour	A. Gamble	1,981	54%	
Liberal	Ernest Stephenson	1,499	40%	
Conservative	R. C. Duncalf	222	6%	
Majority		482		
Registered electors		10,744		
Turnout		3,702	34%	

=== Speke ===
Speke
Party	Candidate	Votes	%	±%
Labour	J. McLean	1,730	70%	
Conservative	K. G. Watkin	421	17%	
Liberal	J. Farley	325	13%	
Majority		1,309		
Registered electors		9,891		
Turnout		2,476	25%	

=== Tuebrook ===
Tuebrook
Party	Candidate	Votes	%	±%
Liberal	June Jones	2,850	57%	
Labour	J. A. Hackett	1,312	26%	
Conservative	D. Ellis	797	16%	
Majority		1,538		
Registered electors		12,445		
Turnout		4,959	40%	

=== Valley ===
Valley
Party	Candidate	Votes	%	±%
Labour	P. Astbury	1,571	50%	
Liberal	Edward Jameson	854	27%	
Conservative	Pamela Stephen	735	23%	
Majority		717		
Registered electors		10,142		
Turnout		3,160	31%	

=== Vauxhall ===
Vauxhall
Party	Candidate	Votes	%	±%
Labour	J. Morgan	2,088	89%	
Liberal	J. Bannister	253	11%	
Majority		1,835		
Registered electors		9,339		
Turnout		2,341	25%	

=== Warbreck ===
Warbreck
Party	Candidate	Votes	%	±%
Conservative	I. Brown	1,701	38%	
Labour	G. Devling	1,361	31%	
SDP	G. G. Endicott	1,358	31%	
Majority		340		
Registered electors		13,779		
Turnout		4,420	32%	

=== Woolton ===
Woolton
Party	Candidate	Votes	%	±%
Conservative	C. G. Hallows	2,384	53%	
Liberal	E. M. Clein	1,239	28%	
Labour	D. A. Bradbury	740	17%	
Ecology	N. Everard	112	3%	
Majority		1,145		
Registered electors		12,817		
Turnout		4,475	35%	
