= Kirkdale (ward) =

Former metropolitan borough council ward in Liverpool, England

Coordinates: 53.441°N 2.9235°W

- Kirkdale ward (2004) within Liverpool
- Area: 6.073 km^{2} (2.345 sq mi)
- Population: 18,657 (2021 census)
  - Density: 3,072/km^{2} (7,960/sq mi)
- Registered Electors: 11,711 (2021 by-election)
- Metropolitan borough: City of Liverpool
- Metropolitan county: Merseyside
- Region: North West
- Country: England
- Sovereign state: United Kingdom
- UK Parliament: Liverpool Walton

Kirkdale ward was an electoral division of Liverpool City Council centred on the Kirkdale and Vauxhall areas of Liverpool.

== Background ==
The ward was first established in 1895 before being dissolved in 1952, it was later reconstituted for the 2004 Municipal elections and again made defunct following boundary changes in 2023.

=== 2004 boundaries ===
A review by the Boundary Committee for England recommended that the council was formed of a reduced number of 90 members elected from 30 wards. The reconstituted Kirkdale ward was formed from most of the former Vauxhall and Melrose wards and a small part of Everton ward. The ward was part of the Liverpool Riverside Parliamentary constituency.

The population of the ward at the 2021 Census was 18,657.

=== 2023 elections ===
Following a 2022 review by the Local Government Boundary Commission for England which decided that the existing 30 wards each represented by three Councillors should be replaced by 64 wards represented by 85 councillors, the ward was split up into the new Kirkdale East, Kirkdale West, Vauxhall and Waterfront North wards.

== Councillors ==
Election	Councillor	Councillor	Councillor
2004	Malcolm Kennedy (Lab)	Cecilia Holleran (Lab)	Joe Hanson (Lab)
2006	Malcolm Kennedy (Lab)	Cecilia Holleran (Lab)	Joe Hanson (Lab)
2007	Malcolm Kennedy (Lab)	Pat Holleran (Lab)	Joe Hanson (Lab)
2008	Malcolm Kennedy (Lab)	Beatrice Fraenkel (Lab)	Joe Hanson (Lab)
2010	Malcolm Kennedy (Lab)	Beatrice Fraenkel (Lab)	Joe Hanson (Lab)
2011	Malcolm Kennedy (Lab)	Beatrice Fraenkel (Lab)	Joe Hanson (Lab)
2012	Malcolm Kennedy (Lab)	Beatrice Fraenkel (Lab)	Joe Hanson (Lab)
2014	Malcolm Kennedy (Lab)	Beatrice Fraenkel (Lab)	Joe Hanson (Lab)
2015	Malcolm Kennedy (Lab)	Beatrice Fraenkel (Lab)	Joe Hanson (Lab)
2016	Malcolm Kennedy (Lab)	Beatrice Fraenkel (Lab)	Joe Hanson (Lab)
2017	Malcolm Kennedy (Lab)	Lisa Gaughan (Lab)	Joe Hanson (Lab)
2018	Malcolm Kennedy (Lab)	Lisa Gaughan (Lab)	Joe Hanson (Lab)
2019	Malcolm Kennedy (Lab)	Lisa Gaughan (Lab)	Joe Hanson (Lab)
2021	Dave Hanratty (Lab)	Lisa Gaughan (Lab)	Joe Hanson (Lab)

indicates seat up for re-election after boundary changes.

indicates seat up for re-election.

indicates change in affiliation.

indicates seat up for re-election after casual vacancy.

=== Notes ===
- Cllr Pat Holleran (Labour, 2007) resigned from the council on 19 March 2008 on health grounds.
- Cllr Beatrice Fraenkel (Labour, 2015) resigned from the council in March 2017 to focus on her role as chair of the Mersey Care NHS Foundation Trust.
- Cllr Malcolm Kennedy (Labour, 2018) resigned from the council in October 2021 after being resident in Spain since March 2020.

== Election results ==
=== Elections of the 2020s ===
Kirkdale By-election: Thursday 18 November 2021
Party	Candidate	Votes	%	±%
**Labour**	**Dave Hanratty**	**852**	**61.69**	**▲2.29**
	Peter Furmedge	171	12.38	Steady
Green	Maria Teresa Coughlan	160	11.59	▼0.06
TUSC	Roger Bannister	84	6.08	▼5.22
Conservative	Kate Maria Burgess	57	4.13	▼1.73
Liberal Democrats	Jenny Turner	57	4.13	▼3.93
Majority		681	49.31	▲1.56
Turnout		1.385	11.83	▼12.38
Registered electors		11,711		
Rejected ballots		4	0.29	▼1.83
Labour **hold**		Swing		

Liverpool City Council Municipal Elections: Thursday 6 May 2021
Party	Candidate	Votes	%	±%
**Labour**	**Joseph Hanson**	**1,703**	**59.40**	**▼19.23**
Green	Peter Andrew Cranie	334	11.65	▲5.60
TUSC	Roger Bannister	324	11.30	▲8.50
Liberal Democrats	Mike McAllister-Bell	231	8.06	▲4.20
Conservative	Brian James Jones	168	5.86	▲4.60
Liberal	Thomas Philip Dunne	107	3.73	N/A
Majority		1,369	47.75	▼23.48
Registered electors		11,840		
Turnout		2,867	24	▲2.72
Rejected ballots		62	2.12%	▲1.84
Labour **hold**		Swing	-12.41	

=== Elections of the 2010s ===
Liverpool City Council Municipal Elections: Thursday 2 May 2019
Party	Candidate	Votes	%	±%
**Labour**	**Lisa Gaughan**	**1,935**	**78.63**	**▼6.52**
UKIP	Corinna Christine Allen	182	7.40	N/A
Green	Jonathan Richard Clatworthy	149	6.05	▲1.97
Liberal Democrats	Mike McAllister-Bell	95	3.86	▲0.88
TUSC	Roger Bannister	69	2.80	▼3.05
Conservative	Katie Maria Burgess	31	1.26	▼2.78
Majority		1,753	71.23	▼5.07
Turnout		2,468	22.02	▼0.47
Registered electors		11,208		
Rejected ballots		7	0.28	▼0.03
Labour **hold**		Swing		

Liverpool City Council Municipal Elections: Thursday 3 May 2018
Party	Candidate	Votes	%	±%
**Labour**	**Malcolm Kennedy**	**2,094**	**85.15**	**▼8.31**
TUSC	Roger Bannister	149	5.85	N/A
Green	Jonathan Richard Clatworthy	104	4.08	▲1.58
Conservative	Daniel Paul Nuttall	103	4.04	▼0.84
Liberal Democrats	Mike McAllister-Bell	76	2.98	▲0.81
Liberal	Thomas Ryan	23	0.90	N/A
Majority		1,945	76.30	▼9.28
Turnout		2,557	22.49	▼37.89
Registered electors		11,370		
Rejected ballots		8	0.31	
Labour **hold**		Swing		

Kirkdale By-election: Thursday 8 June 2017
Party	Candidate	Votes	%	±%
**Labour**	**Lisa Gaughan**	**6,416**	**90.46**	**▲11.06**
Conservative	Chris Hall	346	4.88	▲1.03
Green	Martyn Madeley	177	2.50	▼4.13
Liberal Democrats	Robert Charles McAllister-Bell	154	2.17	N/A
Majority		6,070	85.58	▲16.30
Turnout		7,121	60.38	▲64.21
Registered electors		11,793		
Rejected ballots		28	0.39	
Labour **hold**		Swing	+0.39	

Liverpool City Council Municipal Elections 2016: Thursday 5 May 2016
Party	Candidate	Votes	%	±%
**Labour**	**Joseph Hanson**	**2,166**	**79.40**	**▼1.14**
TUSC	Roger Bannister	276	10.12	▲6.52
Green	Jonathan Richard Clatworthy	181	6.63	▲1.78
Conservative	Stuart Wood	105	3.85	▲0.65
Majority		1,890	69.28	▼4.52
Turnout		2763	25.18	▼33.89
Labour **hold**		Swing	-3.83	

Liverpool City Council Municipal Elections 2015: Thursday 7 May 2015
Party	Candidate	Votes	%	±%
**Labour**	**Beatrice Fraenkel**	**5,280**	**80.54**	**▲1.83**
UKIP	Keith Evans	442	6.74	N/A
Green	Martyn Madeley	318	4.85	▼1.20
TUSC	Roger Bannister	236	3.60	▼3.44
Conservative	David Michael John Jeffery	210	3.20	▼0.22
Independent	Tommy Stalker	70	1.07	N/A
Majority		4,838	73.80	▲2.13
Turnout		6,556	59.07	▲33.98
Labour **hold**		Swing	+1.83	

Liverpool City Council Municipal Elections 2014: 22 May 2014
Party	Candidate	Votes	%	±%
Labour	**Malcolm Kennedy**	2,303	78.71%	−2.93%
TUSC	Roger Bannister	206	7.04%	+2.56%
Green	Jonathan Clatworthy	177	6.05%	+3.26%
Liberal	Tommy Stalker	140	4.78%	+4.37%
Conservative	David Michael John Jeffery	100	3.42%	+1.57%
Majority		2,097	71.67%	−10.1%
Turnout		2,926	25.10%	−2.79%
Labour **hold**		Swing	-2.75%	

Liverpool City Council Municipal Elections 2012: 3 May 2012
Party	Candidate	Votes	%	±%
Labour	**Joe Hanson**	**2771**	**86.89%**	+0.53%
TUSC	Roger Bannister	143	4.48%	−0.18
Green	Jonathan Clatworthy	89	2.79%	−0.26%
Independent	Terence George Burgess	76	2.38	n/a
Conservative	Harry Parshall	59	1.85%	−3.15%
Liberal Democrats	Daniel Waterfield	38	1.19%	n/a
Liberal	Lindsey Janet Mary Wood	13	0.41%	−1.46%
Majority		2628	81.77%	+0.07%
Turnout		3214	27.89%	−2.95%
Labour **hold**		Swing	+0.35	

Liverpool City Council Municipal Elections 2011: 5 May 2011
Party	Candidate	Votes	%	±%
Labour	**Beatrice Fraenkel**	**3001**	**86.36%**	+8.30%
TUSC	Jo McNeill	162	4.66%	n/a
Conservative	David Michael John Jeffery	128	3.68%	−0.8%
Green	Johnathan Richard Clatworthy	106	3.05%	0.63%
Liberal	Irene Norah Jones	78	2.24%	−3.88%
Majority		2839	81.70%	+10.98%
Turnout		3475	30.84%	−17.48%
Labour **hold**		Swing		

Liverpool City Council Municipal Elections 2010: Kirkdale
Party	Candidate	Votes	%	±%
Labour	**Malcolm Kennedy**	**4284**	**78.06%**	
BNP	Steven Greenhalgh	403	7.34%	
Liberal	George Blacklock Roberts	336	6.12%	
Conservative	Nigel Stuart Barber	246	4.48%	
Green	Jonathan Clatworthy	133	2.42%	
Independent	Will Thomson	86	1.57%	
Majority		3881	70.72%	
Turnout		5488	48.32%	
Labour **hold**		Swing		

=== Elections of the 2000s ===
Two councillors were returned in the 2008 election.

Liverpool City Council Municipal Elections 2008: Kirkdale
Party	Candidate	Votes	%	±%
Labour	**Joseph Hanson**	**1971**	**40.33%**	
Labour	**Beatrice Lesser Fraenkel**	**1737**	**35.54%**	
BNP	Steven Greenhalgh	389	7.96%	
Independent	Will Thomson	146	2.99%	
Liberal Democrats	Pauline Bradley	144	2.95%	
Liberal Democrats	Thomas William Morrison	107	2.19%	
Green	Jonathan Clatworthy	96	1.96%	
Green	Alison Edis	95	1.94%	
Conservative	Alma Gavine McGing	95	1.94%	
Conservative	John Astley Watson	61	1.25%	
Liberal	Damien Patrick Daly	46	0.94%	
Majority				
Turnout		4887	23.36%	
Labour **hold**		Swing		

Liverpool City Council Municipal Elections 2007: Kirkdale
Party	Candidate	Votes	%	±%
Labour	**Pat Holleran**	**1927**	**74.52%**	
BNP	Steven Greenhalgh	169	6.54%	
Liberal Democrats	Thomas William Morrison	147	5.68%	
UKIP	Joseph Moran	109	4.22%	
Green	Natalie Grace Emily Awdry	84	3.25%	
Conservative	Nichola Munro	66	2.55%	
Independent	Will Thomson	47	1.82%	
Liberal	Irene Norah Mayes	37	1.43%	
Majority				
Turnout		2586	22.77%	
Labour **hold**		Swing		

Liverpool City Council Municipal Elections 2006: Kirkdale
Party	Candidate	Votes	%	±%
Labour	**Malcolm Kennedy**	**1958**	**78.16%**	
Liberal Democrats	Francis O'Donoghue	232	9.26%	
UKIP	Joseph Moran	182	7.27%	
Conservative	Thomas O'Brien	69	2.75%	
Majority				
Turnout		2505	21.18%	
Labour **hold**		Swing		

After the boundary change of 2004 the whole of Liverpool City Council faced election. Three Councillors were returned.

Liverpool City Council Municipal Elections 2004: Kirkdale
Party	Candidate	Votes	%	±%
Labour	**Joseph Hanson**	**2378**		
Labour	**Cecilia Holleran**	**2315**		
Labour	**Malcolm Kennedy**	**2145**		
Liverpool Labour	Alfred Kincks	365		
Liberal Democrats	Pauline Bradley	274		
Liberal Democrats	David Downham	260		
Liverpool Labour	Sandra Kenwright	258		
Liberal Democrats	Carole Tonner	250		
Liverpool Labour	Thomas Smith	243		
Liberal	David O'Brien	125		
Liberal	Susan O'Brien	125		
Green	Margaret Williams	125		
Green	Daniel Cook	121		
Green	Eline Van Der Linde	115		
Liberal	George Roberts	105		
Majority				
Turnout		3384	28.14%	
Labour **hold**		Swing	n/a	

• italics denotes the sitting Councillor
• bold denotes the winning candidate

== See also ==
- Liverpool City Council
- Liverpool City Council elections 1880–present
- Liverpool Town Council elections 1835 - 1879
