= Riverside (Liverpool ward) =

Former metropolitan borough council ward in Liverpool, England

Coordinates: 53.380°N 2.955°W

- Riverside ward (2004) within Liverpool
- Area: 3.974 km^{2} (1.534 sq mi)
- Population: 23,044 (2021 census)
  - Density: 5,799/km^{2} (15,020/sq mi)
- Registered Electors: 15,653 (2021 election)
- Metropolitan borough: City of Liverpool
- Metropolitan county: Merseyside
- Region: North West
- Country: England
- Sovereign state: United Kingdom
- UK Parliament: Liverpool Riverside

Riverside ward was an electoral division of Liverpool City Council covering the southern city centre, the Dingle, and parts of Toxteth.

== Background ==
The ward was established in 2004 and dissolved in 2023.

=== 2004 boundaries ===
A review by the Boundary Committee for England recommended that the council was formed of a reduced number of 90 members elected from 30 wards. The ward was formed from the former Abercromby and Dingle wards. The ward was part of the Liverpool Riverside Parliamentary constituency.

The ward boundaries followed Hartley Quay, Salthouse Quay, Canning Place, Hanover Street, Ranelagh Street, Renshaw Street, Leece Street, Hardman Street, Hope Street, Windsor Street, Northumberland Street, Park Road, Dingle Lane, the southeastern and southwestern boundaries of Shorefields Village, Ellerman Road and the River Mersey.

The population of the ward taken at the 2011 census was 18,422, and at the 2021 Census was 23,044.

=== 2023 elections ===
Following a 2022 review by the Local Government Boundary Commission for England which decided that the existing 30 wards each represented by three Councillors should be replaced by 64 wards represented by 85 councillors, the ward was split up into the new City Centre South, Dingle, Festival Gardens, and Waterfront South wards, and small parts of the new Canning, City Centre North, Toxteth wards.

== Councillors ==
Election	Councillor	Councillor	Councillor
2004	Joe Anderson (Lab)	Paul Brant (Lab)	Steve Munby (Lab)
2006	Joe Anderson (Lab)	Paul Brant (Lab)	Steve Munby (Lab)
2007	Joe Anderson (Lab)	Paul Brant (Lab)	Steve Munby (Lab)
2008	Joe Anderson (Lab)	Paul Brant (Lab)	Steve Munby (Lab)
2010	Joe Anderson (Lab)	Paul Brant (Lab)	Steve Munby (Lab)
2011	Joe Anderson (Lab)	Paul Brant (Lab)	Steve Munby (Lab)
2012	Joe Anderson (Lab)	Paul Brant (Lab)	Steve Munby (Lab)
2012	Hetty Wood (Lab)	Paul Brant (Lab)	Steve Munby (Lab)
2013	Hetty Wood (Lab)	Michelle Corrigan (Lab)	Steve Munby (Lab)
2014	Hetty Wood (Lab)	Michelle Corrigan (Lab)	Steve Munby (Lab)
2015	Hetty Wood (Lab)	Michelle Corrigan (Lab)	Steve Munby (Lab)
2016	Hetty Wood (Lab)	Michelle Corrigan (Lab)	Steve Munby (Lab)
2018	Hetty Wood (Lab)	Michelle Corrigan (Lab)	Steve Munby (Lab)
2019	Hetty Wood (Lab)	Sarah Doyle (Lab)	Steve Munby (Lab)
2021	Hetty Wood (Lab)	Sarah Doyle (Lab)	Steve Munby (Lab)

indicates seat up for re-election after boundary changes.

indicates seat up for re-election.

indicates change in affiliation.

indicates seat up for re-election after casual vacancy.

=== Notes ===
- Cllr Joe Anderson (Labour, 2010) was elected as Mayor of Liverpool on 3 May 2012 and thereby resigned his council seat.
- Cllr Paul Brant (Labour, 2011) resigned from the council in October 2013 after receiving a Police caution for possession of Class A drugs before subsequently being elected for the Fazakerley ward in 2015.

== Election results ==
=== Elections of the 2020s ===
Liverpool City Council Municipal Elections 2021: Thursday 6 May 2021
Party	Candidate	Votes	%	±%
**Labour**	**Steve Munby**	**2,690**	**67.38**	**▼2.66**
Green	Sally Newey	704	17.64	▲3.04
Liberal Democrats	Hannah Mary Skaife	254	6.36%	▼0.06
Conservative	Harry Glen Gallimore-King	241	6.04	▲1.57
Liberal	Becky Clancy	103	2.58	▲1.74
Majority		1,986	49.75	▼5.69
Turnout		3,992	25.50	▲2.23
Rejected ballots		96	2.35	▲1.43
Total ballots		4,088	26.12	
Registered electors		15,653		
Labour **hold**		Swing	-2.85	

=== Elections of the 2010s ===
Liverpool City Council Municipal Elections 2019: Thursday 2 May 2019
Party	Candidate	Votes	%	±%
**Labour**	**Sarah Doyle**	**2,336**	**70.04**	**▼9.43**
Green	Sally Newey	487	14.60	▲5.53
Liberal Democrats	Anna McCracken	214	6.42	▲0.89
Conservative	Graham Kenwright	149	4.47	▼0.89
Independent	Robin Singleton	121	3.63	N/A
Liberal	Lindsey Janet Mary Wood	28	0.84	N/A
Majority		1,849	55.44	▼14.95
Turnout		3,366	23.27	▲0.08
Rejected ballots		31	0.92	▲0.52
Registered electors		14,464		
Labour **hold**		Swing	-7.48	

Liverpool City Council Municipal Elections 2018: Thursday 3 May 2018
Party	Candidate	Votes	%	±%
**Labour**	**Hetty Wood**	**2,601**	**79.47**	**▲2.87**
Green	Rebecca Lawson	297	9.07	▼1.66
Conservative	Robin Singleton	194	5.93	▲2.37
Liberal Democrats	Anna McCracken	181	5.53	▼0.35
Majority		2,304	70.39	▲4.52
Turnout		3,286	23.19	▼4.23
Rejected ballots		13	0.40	
Registered electors		14,170		
Labour **hold**		Swing	+2.26	

Liverpool City Council Municipal Elections 2016: Thursday 5 May 2016
Party	Candidate	Votes	%	±%
**Labour**	**Steve Munby**	**2,606**	**76.60**	**▲4.79**
Green	Hannah Walkom	365	10.73	▼1.58
Liberal Democrats	Anna McCracken	200	5.88	▲1.61
Conservative	Giselle McDonald	121	3.56	▼3.45
English Democrat	Michael John Lane	110	3.23	
Majority		2,241	65.87	▲6.37
Turnout		3,443	27.42	▼32.17
Labour **hold**		Swing	+3.19	

Liverpool City Council Municipal Elections 2015: 7th May 2015
Party	Candidate	Votes	%	±%
**Labour**	**Michelle Corrigan**	**5,181**	**71.81**	**▲4.50**
Green	Hannah Walkom	888	12.31	▲3.37
Conservative	Laura Watson	506	7.01	▲3.22
Liberal Democrats	Michael Francis Dunne	308	4.27	▲0.90
TUSC	John Gary Marston	222	3.08	▲0.46
English Democrat	Michael John Lane	110	1.52	N/A
Majority		4,293	59.50	▲5.57
Turnout		7,215	59.59	▲33.46
Labour **hold**		Swing	+0.57	

Liverpool City Council Municipal Elections 2014: 22nd May 2014
Party	Candidate	Votes	%	±%
**Labour**	**Hetty Wood**	**2,078**	**67.31**	**▼3.59**
UKIP	Darren McCready	413	13.38	▲5.38
Green	Martin Sydney Dobson	276	8.94	▼0.74
Conservative	John Astley Watson	117	3.79	▲1.17
Liberal Democrats	Sean McHugh	104	3.37	▼0.93
TUSC	John Gary Marston	81	2.62	▼0.67
Liberal	Ian Thomas Bull	18	0.58	N/A
Majority		1,665	53.93	▼7.29
Turnout		3,391	26.13	▲14.5
Labour **hold**		Swing	-4.49	

Riverside by-election: 5th December 2013
Party	Candidate	Votes	%	±%
**Labour**	**Michelle Corrigan**	**1,055**	**70.90**	**▼5.95**
Green	Martin Dobson	144	9.68	▲0.88
UKIP	Adam Heatherington	119	8.00	N/A
Liberal Democrats	Kevin White	64	4.30	▼0.07
TUSC	John Marston	49	3.29	▼2.92
Conservative	Chris Hall	39	2.62	▼1.16
English Democrat	Steven McEllenborough	9	0.60	N/A
Independent	Peter Cooney	7	0.47%	N/A
Independent	Alison Louise Goudie	1	0.07	N/A
Majority		911	61.22	▼6.83
Turnout		1,488	11.63	▼5.05
Labour **hold**		Swing	-2.54	

Riverside by-election: 5th July 2012
Party	Candidate	Votes	%	±%
**Labour Co-op**	**Hetty Wood**	**1,424**	**76.85**	**▼4.58**
Green	Peter Andrew Cranie	163	8.80	▲2.97
TUSC	Chris McDermott	115	6.21	▲2.88
Liberal Democrats	Nicola Jane Beckett	81	4.37	N/A
Conservative	Alma Gavine McGing	70	3.78	▲0.47
Majority		1,261	68.05	▼6.93
Turnout		1,853	16.68	▼12.78
Labour **hold**		Swing	-0.81	

Liverpool City Council Municipal Elections 2012: 3rd May 2012
Party	Candidate	Votes	%	±%
**Labour**	**Steve Munby**	**2,666**	**81.43**	**▲3.52**
Green	Peter Andrew Cranie	191	5.83	▲0.31
Conservative	Angela Oates	139	4.25	▼1.41
TUSC	Celia Ralph	109	3.33	▲0.85
English Democrat	Neil Kenny	103	3.15	N/A
Liberal	Irene Norah Mayes	66	2.02	▲0.28
Majority		2,475	74.98	▲0.73
Turnout		3,301	29.46	▼1.84
Labour **hold**		Swing	+2.47	

Liverpool City Council Municipal Elections 2011: 5th May 2011
Party	Candidate	Votes	%	±%
**Labour**	**Paul David Brant**	**2,836**	**79.91**	**▲12.42**
Conservative	Alma Gavine McGing	201	5.66	▼1.47
Liberal Democrats	Kathryn Dadswell	198	5.58	▼11.76
Green	Peter Andrew Cranie	196	5.52	▲0.75
TUSC	Daren Andrew Ireland	88	2.48	N/A
Liberal	Michael Morgan	30	0.85	▼2.42
Majority		2,635	74.25	▲24.10
Turnout		3,549	31.30	▼19.52
Labour **hold**		Swing	▲6.95	

Liverpool City Council Municipal Elections 2010: Riverside
Party	Candidate	Votes	%	±%
Labour	**Joseph Anderson**	**3978**	**67.49%**	**−5.59%**
Liberal Democrats	Reginald Robert Standish	1022	17.34%	+9.31%
Conservative	Alma Gavine McGing	420	7.13%	−0.38%
Green	Lewis Coyne	281	4.77%	−2.55%
Liberal	Maria Langley	193	3.27%	−0.79%
Majority		2956	50.15%	
Turnout		5894	50.82%	+27.47%
Labour **hold**		Swing	7.45%	

=== Elections of the 2000s ===
Liverpool City Council Municipal Elections 2008: Riverside
Party	Candidate	Votes	%	±%
Labour	**Stephen Patrick Munby**	**1838**	**73.08%**	
Liberal Democrats	Conor Julian McDonald	202	8.03%	
Conservative	Emlyn Williams	189	7.51%	
Green	William Ward	184	7.32%	
Liberal	John Graves	102	4.06%	
Majority				
Turnout		2515	23.35%	
Labour **hold**		Swing		

Liverpool City Council Municipal Elections 2007: Riverside
Party	Candidate	Votes	%	±%
Labour	**Paul Brant**	**1678**	**69.40%**	
Liberal Democrats	Conor Julian McDonald	252	10.42%	
Conservative	Emlyn Williams	241	9.97%	
Green	Jonathan Clatworthy	184	7.61%	
Liberal	David O'Brien	63	2.61%	
Majority				
Turnout		2418	23.27	
Labour **hold**		Swing		

Liverpool City Council Municipal Elections 2006: Riverside
Party	Candidate	Votes	%	±%
Labour	**Joe Anderson**	**1562**	**65.96%**	
Liberal Democrats	Gabriel Bernard Muies	267	11.28%	
Conservative	Richard Perkins	205	8.66%	
Green	Jonathan Clatworthy	180	7.60%	
Liberal	Irene Norah Mayes	90	3.80%	
United Socialist	Cecilia Ralph	64	2.70%	
Majority				
Turnout		2368	21.19%	
Labour **hold**		Swing		

After the boundary change of 2004 the whole of Liverpool City Council faced election. Three Councillors were returned.

Liverpool City Council Municipal Elections 2004: Riverside
Party	Candidate	Votes	%	±%
Labour	**Stephen Munby**	**1532**		
Labour	**Paul Brant**	**1524**		
Labour	**Joseph Anderson**	**1468**		
Liberal Democrats	Perry Lee	712		
Liberal Democrats	Annette Butler	681		
Liberal Democrats	Gabriel Muies	637		
Green	Natasha Stentiford	188		
Conservative	John Watson	171		
Conservative	Natasha Stentiford	166		
Green	Lynsey Warner	165		
Green	Jennifer Brown	154		
Communist	James Cormack	86		
Majority				
Turnout		2810	28.04%	
Labour **hold**		Swing	n/a	

- italics denotes the sitting Councillor
- **bold** denotes the winning candidate
