= Old Swan (ward) =

Former metropolitan borough council ward in Liverpool, England

Coordinates: 53.4169°N 2.9175°W

- Area: 2.555 km^{2} (0.986 sq mi)
- Population: 15,596 (2021 census)
  - Density: 6,104/km^{2} (15,810/sq mi)
- Registered Electors: 11,016 (2021 election)
- Metropolitan borough: City of Liverpool
- Metropolitan county: Merseyside
- Region: North West
- Country: England
- Sovereign state: United Kingdom
- UK Parliament: Liverpool Wavertree

Old Swan ward was an electoral division of Liverpool City Council, centred on the Old Swan district of Liverpool.

== Background ==
The ward was created in 1953; its boundaries were changed in 1973, 1980 and 2004 before being divided up in 2023.

=== 1980 boundaries ===
1980 Old Swan ward

The ward boundary was changed for the 1980 elections. A report of the Local Government Boundary Commission for England published in November 1978 set out proposals for changes to the wards of Liverpool City Council, maintaining the number of councillors at 99 representing 33 wards. Old Swan ward was represented by three councillors.

The report describes the boundaries of Old Swan ward as "Commencing at a point where the southeastern boundary of Tuebrook Ward meets the southwestern boundary of Croxteth Ward, thence southeastwards along said southwestern boundary and southwards and southwestwards along the western boundary of Broad Green Ward and continuing southwards along Mill Lane to the Edge Hill to Huyton railway line, thence westwards along said railway to Rathbone Road, thence northeastwards along said road to Pighue Lane, thence generally northwestwards along said lane to the railway at Olive Mount Curve, thence northwestwards along said railway to the southeastern boundary of Tuebrook Ward, thence northwestwards and northeastwards along said boundary to the point of commencement".

=== 2004 boundaries ===
Old Swan ward (2004) within Liverpool

A review by the Boundary Committee for England recommended that the council was formed of a reduced number of 90 members elected from 30 wards. The ward was formed from the former Old Swan ward, losing a small area to the new Tuebrook and Stoneycroft ward and gaining a part of the former Broadgreen ward. The ward was part of the Liverpool Wavertree Parliamentary constituency.

The population of the ward at the 2021 Census was 15,596.

== Councillors ==
Election	Councillor	Councillor	Councillor
WARD REFORMED
1980	Francis Richard Haywood (Lib)	Peter Joseph Lloyd (Lab)	Josephine Smith (Lib)
1982	Francis Richard Haywood (Lib)	Peter Joseph Lloyd (Lab)	Anthony Loftus (Lib)
1983	G Lloyd (Lab)	Peter Joseph Lloyd (Lab)	Anthony Loftus (Lib)
1984	G Lloyd (Lab)	Peter Joseph Lloyd (Lab)	Anthony Loftus (Lib)
1986	G Lloyd (Lab)	Peter Joseph Lloyd (Lab)	Anthony Loftus (Lib)
1987	L Hughes (Lab)	Peter Joseph Lloyd (Lab)	Anthony Loftus (Lib)
1988	L Hughes (Lab)	J Fitzsimmons (Lab)	Anthony Loftus (Lib)
1990	L Hughes (Lab)	J Fitzsimmons (Lab)	K Williams (Lab)
1991	L Hughes (Lab)	J Fitzsimmons (Lab)	K Williams (Lab)
1992	L Hughes (Lab)	Mary Johnston (LD)	K Williams (Lab)
1994	L Hughes (Lab)	Mary Johnston (LD)	J Downham (LD)
1995	Keith Turner (LD)	Mary Johnston (LD)	J Downham (LD)
1996	Keith Turner (LD)	Bernie Turner (LD)	J Downham (LD)
1998	Keith Turner (LD)	Bernie Turner (LD)	Kevin Firth (LD)
1999	Keith Turner (LD)	Bernie Turner (LD)	Kevin Firth (LD)
2000	Keith Turner (LD)	Bernie Turner (LD)	Kevin Firth (LD)
2002	Keith Turner (LD)	Bernie Turner (LD)	Kevin Firth (LD)
2003	Keith Turner (LD)	Bernie Turner (LD)	Kevin Firth (LD)
WARD REFORMED
2004	Keith Turner (LD)	Berni Turner (LD)	Kevin Firth (LD)
2006	Keith Turner (LD)	Berni Turner (LD)	Kevin Firth (LD)
2007	Keith Turner (LD)	Berni Turner (LD)	Kevin Firth (LD)
2008	Keith Turner (LD)	Berni Turner (LD)	Gary Millar (LD)
2010	Joanne Anderson (Lab)	Berni Turner (LD)	Gary Millar (LD)
2011	Joanne Anderson (Lab)	Peter Brennan (Lab)	Gary Millar (Lab)
2012	Joanne Anderson (Lab)	Peter Brennan (Lab)	Gary Millar (Lab)
2014	Joanne Anderson (Lab)	Peter Brennan (Lab)	Gary Millar (Lab)
2015	Joanne Anderson (Lab)	Peter Brennan (Lab)	Gary Millar (Lab)
2016	Joanne Anderson (Lab)	Peter Brennan (Lab)	Gary Millar (Lab)
2018	Joanne Anderson (Lab)	Peter Brennan (Lab)	Gary Millar (Lab)
2019	Joanne Anderson (Lab)	William Shorthall (Lab)	Gary Millar (Lab)
2021	Joanne Calvert (Lab)	William Shorthall (Lab)	Rona Heron (Lab)

indicates seat up for re-election after boundary changes.

indicates seat up for re-election.

indicates change in affiliation.

indicates seat up for re-election after casual vacancy.

=== Notes ===
- Cllr Gary Millar (Lib Dem, 2008) left the Liberal Democrats and continued to serve as a Labour councillor in April 2011.
- Cllr Peter Brennan (Labour, 2015), who was the serving Lord Mayor of Liverpool, was forced to resign after sharing a racist video on social media.

== Election results ==
=== Elections of the 2020s ===
Liverpool City Council Municipal Elections 2021:6 May 2021
Party	Candidate	Votes	%	±%
**Labour**	**Rona Ellen Heron**	**1,493**	**47.81**	**▼24.55**
Liberal	Mick Coyne	674	21.58	▲13.88
Old Swan Against the Cuts	Martin Ralph	315	10.09	▲7.08
Green	Mark Damon Jackson	237	7.59	▼0.22
Liberal Democrats	Gary Wilson	235	7.52	▲1.58
Conservative	Gillian Michelle Ferrigno	169	5.41	▲2.22
Majority		819	26.22%	▼38.33
Turnout		3,165	28.73	▲3.57
Rejected ballots		42	1.33	▲0.44
Total ballots		3,207	29.11	
Registered electors		11,016		
Labour **hold**		Swing	-19.22	

=== Elections of the 2010s ===
Old Swan by-election: 19 September 2019
Party	Candidate	Votes	%	±%
**Labour**	**William Shortall**	**1,153**	**55.38**	**▼16.98**
Liberal	Mick Coyne	293	14.07	▲6.37
Liberal Democrats	Chris Lea	272	13.06	▲7.12
Old Swan Against the Cuts	Martin Ralph	138	6.63	▲3.62
Green	George Maxwell	130	6.24	▼1.57
Conservative	Peter Andrew	96	4.61	▲1.42
Majority		860	41.31	▼23.24
Turnout		2,096	18.70	▼6.46
Rejected ballots		14	0.67	▼0.22
Total ballots		2,110	18.83	
Registered electors		11,207		
Labour **hold**		Swing	-11.68	

Liverpool City Council Municipal Elections: Thursday 3 May 2019
Party	Candidate	Votes	%	±%
**Labour**	**Peter Brennan**	**2,021**	**72.36**	**▼2.63**
Green	George Maxwell	218	7.81	▲3.21
Liberal	Mick Coyne	215	7.70	▲7.35
Liberal Democrats	Norman Darbyshire	166	5.94	▲0.35
Conservative	Derek Thomas Nuttall	89	3.19	▼1.78
Old Swan Against the Cuts	Martin Ralph	84	3.01	▼2.47
Majority		1,803	64.55	▼4.85
Turnout		2,818	25.16	▼0.78
Rejected ballots		25	0.89	▲0.51
Total ballots		2,843	25.38	
Registered electors		11,201		
Labour **hold**		Swing	▼2.87	

Liverpool City Council Municipal Elections: Thursday 3 May 2018
Party	Candidate	Votes	%	±%
**Labour**	**Joanne Calvert**	**2,174**	**74.99**	**▲6.28**
Liberal Democrats	Chris Collins	162	5.59	▼2.86
Old Swan Against the Cuts	Martin Ralph	157	5.42	▼6.59
Conservative	Derek Thomas Nuttall	144	4.97	▲1.66
Green	George Duncan Maxwell	136	4.69	▼0.21
Liberal	Irene Lillian Morrison	126	0.35	▲1.74
Majority		2,012	69.40	▲12.70
Turnout		2,910	25.94	▼4.91
Rejected ballots		11	0.38	▼1.59
Total ballots		2,921	26.03	
Registered electors		11,220		
Labour **hold**		Swing	+4.57	

Liverpool City Council Municipal Elections: Thursday 5 May 2016
Party	Candidate	Votes	%	±%
**Labour**	**Gary Millar**	**2,260**	**68.71**	**▼3.62**
Old Swan Against the Cuts	Martin Ralph	395	12.01	▲5.98
Liberal Democrats	Huw Poston Kentish Dawson	278	8.45	▲5.55
Green	Noreen Maguinness	161	4.90	▲1.01
Conservative	George Powell	109	3.31	▼0.32
Liberal	Marjorie Peel	86	2.61	▲0.04
Majority		1,865	56.70	▼6.97
Turnout		3,355	30.85	▼34.02
Rejected ballots		66	1.97	▲1.45
Total ballots		3,421	31.46	
Registered electors		10,875		
Labour **hold**		Swing	-4.80	

Liverpool City Council Municipal Elections: Thursday 7 May 2015
Party	Candidate	Votes	%	±%
**Labour**	**Peter Brennan**	**5,244**	**72.33**	**▲11.72**
UKIP	Leanne Nichola Sheelan	628	8.66	▼7.16
Old Swan Against the Cuts	Martin Ralph	437	6.03	▼2.50
Green	Gina Shaw	282	3.89	▼0.43
Conservative	George Powell	263	3.63	▲0.55
Liberal Democrats	Jacqueline Elaine Wilson	210	2.90	▼0.10
Liberal	Sheila Ann Fairclough	186	2.57	▼1.43
Majority		4,616	63.67	▲18.84
Turnout		7,250	64.54	▲33.62
Rejected ballots		38	0.52	
Total ballots		7,288	64.87	
Registered electors		11,234		
Labour **hold**		Swing	+9.44	

Liverpool City Council Municipal Elections 2014: 22 Thursday May 2014
Party	Candidate	Votes	%	±%
**Labour**	**Joanne Calvert**	**2,105**	**60.61**	**▼11.33**
UKIP	Tony Hammond	549	15.82	▲15.82
Old Swan Against the Cuts	Martin Ralph	296	8.53	▲8.53
Green	Vikki Ann Gregorich	150	4.32	▼0.84
Liberal	Shiela Fairclough	139	4.00	▼3.45
Conservative	George Powell	107	3.08	▲0.34
Liberal Democrats	Jacqueline Elaine Wilson	104	3.00	▼3.17
English Democrat	Steven Greenhalgh	21	0.61	▼2.49
Majority		1,556	44.83	▼19.66
Turnout		3,471	31.25	▼1.19
Labour **hold**		Swing	-13.58	

Liverpool City Council Municipal Elections 2012: Thursday 3 May 2012
Party	Candidate	Votes	%	±%
**Labour**	**Gary Millar**	**2,577**	**71.94**	**▲6.43**
Liberal	Mary Jane Canning	267	7.45	▲4.62
Liberal Democrats	Jackie Wilson	221	6.17	▼12.12
Green	Vikki Gregorich	185	5.16	▲2.80
TUSC	John Martin Ralph	123	3.43	▲1.63
English Democrat	Steven Greenhalgh	111	3.10	▲1.69
Conservative	Norman Coppell	98	2.74	▼0.13
Majority		2,310	64.49	▲17.27
Turnout		3582	32.44	▼4.69
Labour **hold**		Swing	+0.91	

Liverpool City Council Municipal Elections 2011: Thursday 5 May 2011
Party	Candidate	Votes	%	±%
**Labour**	**Peter Brennan**	**2,689**	**65.51**	**▲12.14**
Liberal Democrats	Berni Turner	751	18.29	▼16.83
UKIP	Tony Put Locals First Over Housing Hammond	202	4.92	▲4.92
Conservative	Norman Coppell	118	2.87	▼0.60
Liberal	Mary Jane Canning	116	2.83	▲1.33
Green	Vikki Gregorich	97	2.36	▼0.55
TUSC	John Martin Ralph	74	1.80	▲1.80
English Democrat	Steven McEllenborough	58	1.41	▲1.41
Majority		1,938	47.22	▲28.98
Turnout		4105	37.13	▼21.94
Labour **hold**		Swing	+14.49	

Liverpool City Council Municipal Elections 2010: Thursday 6 May 2010
Party	Candidate	Votes	%	±%
**Labour**	**Joanne Anderson**	**3,557**	**53.37**	**▲26.56**
Liberal Democrats	Keith Turner	2,341	35.12	▼9.51
BNP	Steven McEllenborough	242	3.63	▼6.13
Conservative	Gwynneth May Hicklin	231	3.47	▼0.66
Green	Vikki Gregorich	194	2.91	▼1.32
Liberal	Elaine Tyrer	100	1.50	▼8.94
Majority		1,216	18.24	
Turnout		6,665	59.07	▲32.48
Labour **gain** from Liberal Democrats		Swing	+18.04	

=== Elections of the 2000s ===
Liverpool City Council Municipal Elections 2008: Thursday 1 May 2008
Party	Candidate	Votes	%	±%
**Liberal Democrats**	**Gary Millar**	**1,372**	**44.63**	**▼19.93**
Labour	Allen Edward John Hammond	824	26.81	▲3.43
Liberal	Edith Bamford	321	10.44	▲5.82
BNP	Steven McEllenborough	300	9.76	▲9.76
Green	Paul Matthew Grimes	130	4.23	▲0.44
Conservative	Lauren Graham	127	4.13	▲0.48
Majority		548	17.82	▼23.36
Turnout		3,074	26.59	▼2.73
Liberal Democrats **hold**		Swing	-11.68	

Liverpool City Council Municipal Elections 2007: Thursday 3 May 2007
Party	Candidate	Votes	%	±%
**Liberal Democrats**	**Berni Turner**	**2,248**	**64.56**	**▲16.16**
Labour	Claire Wilner	814	23.38	▼5.57
Liberal	Edith Bamford	161	4.62	▼1.18
Green	Paul Matthew Grimes	132	3.79	▼0.73
Conservative	Neil Alan Wilson	127	3.65	▼1.34
Majority		1,434	41.18	▲21.73
Turnout		3,482	29.32	▲5.12
Liberal Democrats **hold**		Swing	+10.87	

Liverpool City Council Municipal Elections 2006: Thursday 4 May 2006
Party	Candidate	Votes	%	±%
**Liberal Democrats**	**Keith Turner**	**1,436**	**48.40**	
Labour	Wendy Simon	859	28.95	
Liberal	Edith Bamford	172	5.80	
UKIP	Mark Eric Bill	150	5.06	
Conservative	Pauline Dougherty	148	4.99	
Green	Paul Matthew Grimes	134	4.52	
United Socialist	Paul Filby	68	2.29	
Majority		577	19.45	
Turnout		2,967	24.20	
Liberal Democrats **hold**		Swing		

After the boundary change of 2004 the whole of Liverpool City Council faced election. Three Councillors were returned.

Liverpool City Council Municipal Elections 2004: 10 June 2004
Party	Candidate	Votes	%	±%
**Liberal Democrats**	**Kevin Firth**	**2,290**		
Liberal Democrats	Bernadetter Turner	2,286		
Liberal Democrats	Keith Turner	2,239		
Labour	John McCabe	1,096		
Labour	Joseph Roberts	807		
Labour	Carl Roper	786		
Liberal	John Moore	206		
Liberal	Maria Langley	176		
Socialist Alliance	Cecelia Ralph	171		
Socialist Alliance	John Ralph	169		
Socialist Alliance	Paul Filby	112		
Majority				
Turnout		4,051	32.77	
Liberal Democrats **win** (new seat)				
Liberal Democrats **win** (new seat)				
Liberal Democrats **win** (new seat)				

Italics indicate the sitting Councillor. Bold indicates the winning candidate.

== See also ==
- Liverpool City Council
- Liverpool City Council elections 1880–present
- Liverpool Town Council elections 1835 - 1879
