= Toxteth (Liverpool ward) =

Metropolitan borough council ward in Liverpool, England

- Toxteth ward within Liverpool
- Population: 4,044 (2023 electorate)
- Metropolitan borough: City of Liverpool
- Metropolitan county: Merseyside
- Region: North West
- Country: England
- Sovereign state: United Kingdom
- UK Parliament: Liverpool Riverside
- Councillors: Rahima Farah (Labour)

Toxteth ward is an electoral district of Liverpool City Council within the Liverpool Riverside constituency.

== Background ==
=== 2023 ward ===
The ward was created for the elections held on 4 May 2023 following a 2022 review by the Local Government Boundary Commission for England, which decided that the previous 30 wards each represented by three Councillors should be replaced by 64 wards represented by 85 councillors with varying representation by one, two or three councillors per ward. The Toxteth ward was created as a single-member ward from the western half of the former Princes Park ward and part of the former Riverside ward. The ward boundaries follow Upper Parliament Street, Princes Road, Devonshire Road, Admiral Street, North Hill Street, and Park Road.

== Councillors ==
Election	Councillor
2023	Rahima Farah (Lab)

indicates seat up for re-election after boundary changes.

indicates seat up for re-election.

indicates change in affiliation.

indicates seat up for re-election after casual vacancy.

== Election results ==
=== Elections of the 2020s ===
4th May 2023
Party	Candidate	Votes	%	±%
Labour	Rahima Farah	788	75.48	
Green	Mark Damon Jackson	256	24.52	
Majority		532	50.96	
Turnout		1,044	22.87	
Rejected ballots		14	1.32	
Total ballots		1,259	23.18	
Registered electors		4,564		
Labour win (new seat)				
