= City Centre North (Liverpool ward) =

Electoral district of Liverpool

- City Centre North ward within Liverpool
- Population: 4,690 (2023 electorate)
- Metropolitan borough: City of Liverpool
- Metropolitan county: Merseyside
- Region: North West
- Country: England
- Sovereign state: United Kingdom
- UK Parliament: Liverpool Riverside
- Councillors: Christine Banks (Labour); Nick Small (Labour)

City Centre North ward is an electoral district of Liverpool City Council within the Liverpool Riverside Parliamentary constituency.

The ward was created for the elections held on 4 May 2023 following a 2022 review by the Local Government Boundary Commission for England, which created the ward to be represented by two councillors. The ward covers most of the western half of the former Central ward with small sections of the former Everton and Riverside wards.

The ward includes part of the Vauxhall area, and part of Liverpool city centre, including St George's Hall and Liverpool Town Hall. The ward boundaries follow Leeds Street, Bath Street, the Strand, Liver Street, Hanover Street, Lime Street and Byrom Way.

== Councillors ==
Election	Councillor	Councillor
2023	Christine Banks (Lab)	Nick Small (Lab)

indicates seat up for re-election after boundary changes.

indicates seat up for re-election.

indicates change in affiliation.

indicates seat up for re-election after casual vacancy.

== Election results ==
=== Elections of the 2020s ===
4th May 2023 - 3 seats
Party	Candidate	Votes	%	±%
Labour	Christine Banks^{§}	466	30.05	
Labour	Nick Small^{§}	373	24.05	
Green	Sally Newey	264	17.02	
Liverpool Community Independents	Maria Toolan^{§}	247	15.93	
Liberal Democrats	Karl Robert White	115	7.41	
Independent	Brian Phillips	60	3.87	
Independent	Jacob McNally	26	1.68	
Majority		202		
Registered electors		4,690		
Turnout				
Rejected ballots		7		
Total ballots				
Labour win (new seat)				
Labour win (new seat)				

^{§}Christine Banks, Nick Small and Maria Toolan were re-standing councillors for the former Central ward.
