= 2016 Liverpool City Council election =

2016 UK local government election

- 7 May 2016

32 of 90 seats (One Third and two by-election) to Liverpool City Council 46 seats needed for a majority
- Turnout: 31% (▼48%)
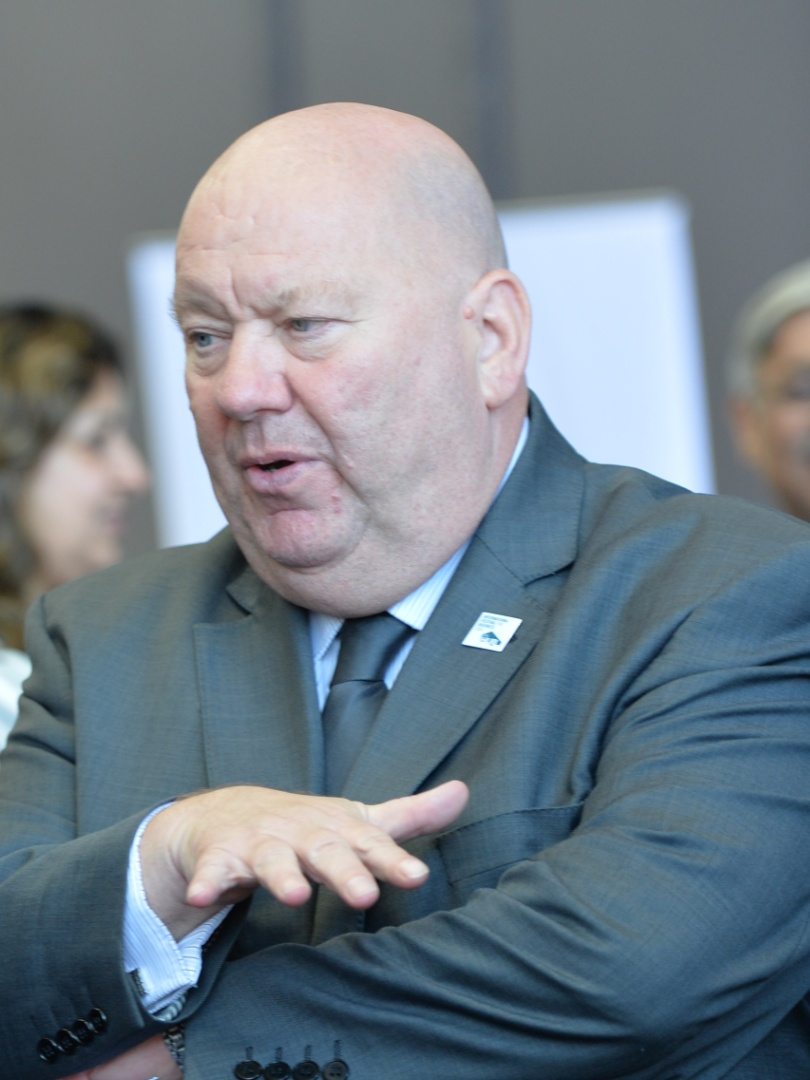

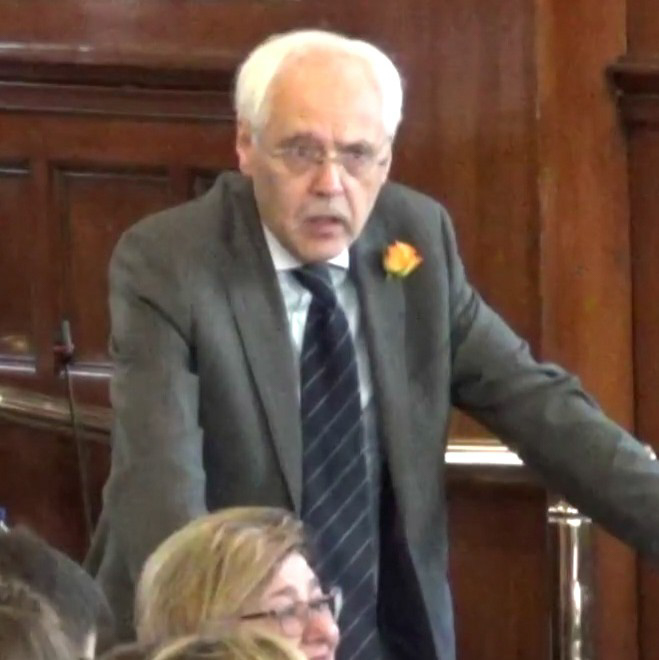

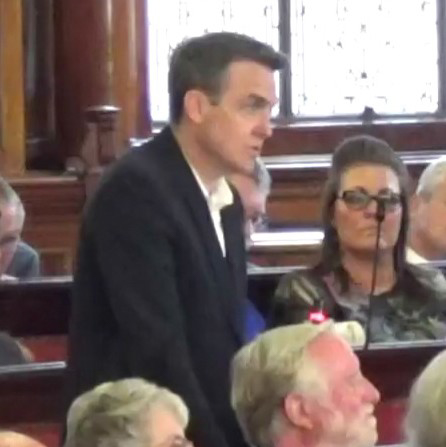

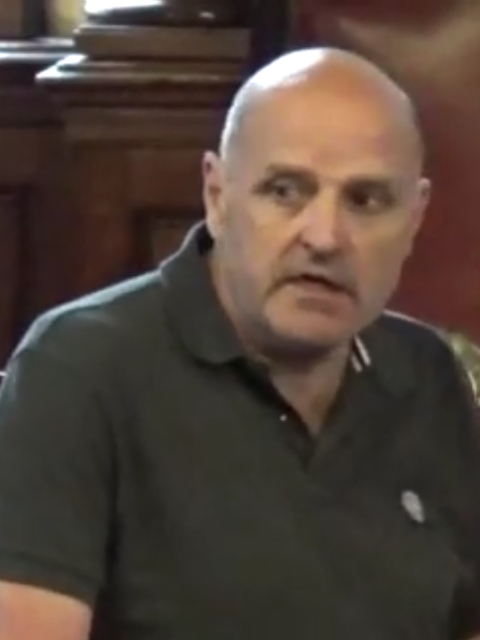
	First party	Second party	Third party
Leader	Joe Anderson	Richard Kemp	Tom Crone
Party	Labour	Liberal Democrats	Green
Leader's seat	N/A, Mayor	Church	St Michael's
Last election	78 seats, 67%	1 seat, 16.7%	1 seat, 9.7%
Seats before	80	2	4
Seats won	26	3	1
Seats after	81	4	4
Seat change	▲1	▲2	Steady
Popular vote	60,164	16,375	10,551
Percentage	61%	17%	11%
Swing	▼6%	▲8.55%	▼1%
	Fourth party
Leader	Steve Radford
Party	Liberal
Leader's seat	Tuebrook and Stoneycroft
Last election	0 seats, 3.1%
Seats before	2
Seats won	1
Seats after	2
Seat change	Steady
Popular vote	5,127
Percentage	5%
Swing	▲2.1%
- Map of results of 2016 election
Control of Council before election
Joe Anderson
Labour
Control of Council after Election
Joe Anderson
Labour

The 2016 Liverpool City Council election took place on 5 May 2016 to elect members of Liverpool City Council in England. This was on the same day as the election for the Elected Mayor of Liverpool and the Police and Crime Commissioner for Merseyside.

Due to the 'in thirds' system of election, one third of the council were up for election, with direct comparisons to previous results made with the corresponding vote at the 2012 Liverpool City Council election. There were two by-elections in Belle Vale and Norris Green wards, so these wards each elected two councillors.

== Council composition ==
Prior to the election the composition of the council was:

↓
81	4	2	2	1
Lab	G	LD	L	I

After the election the composition of the council was:

↓
80	4	4	2
Lab	G	LD	L

== Election result ==
Liverpool local election result 2016
Party	Seats	Gains	Losses	Net gain/loss	Seats %	Votes %	Votes	+/−
Labour	27	1	2	-1	91%	61%	60,164	-6%
Liberal Democrats	3	+2	0	+2	9%	17%	16,375	+8.55%
Green	1	0	0	0	3%	11%	10,551	-1%
Liberal	2	0	0	0	3%	5%	5,127	+2.1%
Conservative	0	0	0	0	0%	4%	4,405	
UKIP	0	0	0	0	0%	2.5%	2,437	
TUSC	0	0	0	0	0%	2.3%	2,292	
Old Swan Against the Cuts	0	0	0	0	0%	0.4%	395	
English Democrat	0	0	0	0	0%	0.3%	290	
Independent	0	0	1	-1	0%	0.24%	236	

== Ward results ==
* - Existing Councillor seeking re-election.

=== Allerton and Hunts Cross ===
Allerton and Hunts Cross
Party	Candidate	Votes	%	±%
Liberal Democrats	Mirna Lizzett Juarez	2,105	47%	
Labour	Ged Gibbons *	1,628	36%	
Conservative	Johnathan Peter Andrew	353	8%	
Green	Maggi Williams	289	6%	
Liberal	Irene Lillian Morrison	89	2%	
Majority		477		
Registered electors		11,411		
Turnout		4,464	39%	
Rejected ballots		50		
Liberal Democrats gain from Labour		Swing		

=== Anfield ===
Anfield
Party	Candidate	Votes	%	±%
Labour	Ros Groves	1,601	75%	
Liberal	Jimmy Richardson	132	6.2%	
Liberal Democrats	Jeanette Makinson	120	5.6%	
Green	Shaun Ingram	120	5.6%	
Conservative	Thomas Stafford Roberts	89	4.2%	
TUSC	Benjamin Mark Bolton	65	6.2%	
Majority		1,469		
Registered electors		8,972		
Turnout		2,127	24%	
Rejected ballots		15		
Labour hold		Swing		

=== Belle Vale ===
Belle Vale - 2 seats
Party	Candidate	Votes	%	±%
Labour	Ruth Lillian Bennett	2,196	65%	
Labour	Helen Thompson	1,761	52%	
Liberal Democrats	Stephen Atkinson	384	11.37%	
TUSC	Alan David Fogg	360	6.5%	
TUSC	Roy Dixon	292	5.3%	
Green	Hilary McDonagh	217	3.9%	
Conservative	Beryl Pinnington	127	2.3%	
Conservative	Elizabeth Ann Pearson	94	1.7%	
Liberal	Damien Patrick Daly	92	1.7%	
Majority		1,812		
Registered electors		11,290		
Turnout		3,376	30%	
Rejected ballots		23		
Labour hold		Swing		
Labour hold		Swing		

=== Central ===
Central
Party	Candidate	Votes	%	±%
Labour	Christine Banks *	1,213	70%	
Green	Robbie Coyne	285	16%	
Conservative	Lee David Berry	100	5.7%	
Liberal Democrats	Jacqueline Elaine Wilson	95	5.4%	
Liberal	James Robert Dykstra	52	3%	
Majority		928		
Registered electors		10,515		
Turnout		1,745	16%	
Rejected ballots		17		
Labour hold		Swing		

=== Childwall ===
Childwall
Party	Candidate	Votes	%	±%
Labour	Liz Parsons	2,234	53%	+1%
Liberal Democrats	Pat Moloney	1,236	29%	+14%
Green	Lewis Coyne	274	6%	−1%
UKIP	Shimrit Manning	299	7%	−1%
Conservative	Nathan Charles Denham	196	5%	−3%
Majority		998		
Registered electors		10,885		
Turnout		4,239	39%	
Rejected ballots		55		
Labour hold		Swing		

=== Church ===
Church
Party	Candidate	Votes	%	±%
Liberal Democrats	Andrew Kendrick Makinson	2,903	56%	
Labour	Jan McDermott	1,441	28%	
Green	Eleanor Janet Mary Martin	426	8.2%	
Liberal	John Francis Bradley	135	2.6%	
Conservative	David Jeffery	133	2.5%	
TUSC	William Delf	46	0.9%	
Majority		1,462		
Registered electors		10,593		
Turnout		5,207	49%	
Rejected ballots		49		
Liberal Democrats hold		Swing		

=== Clubmoor ===
Clubmoor
Party	Candidate	Votes	%	±%
Labour	James Edward Noakes *	2,072	73%	
Green	James Alexander Melia-Jones	244	8.6%	
Liberal Democrats	Paula Keaveney	204	7.2%	
Liberal	Paul Wynne Jones	200	7.1%	
Conservative	Derek Thomas Nuttall	105	3.7%	
Majority		1,828		
Registered electors		10,871		
Turnout		2,825	26%	
Rejected ballots		62		
Labour hold		Swing		

=== County ===
County
Party	Candidate	Votes	%	±%
Labour	Kay Elizabeth Davies	1,813	73%	
Liberal Democrats	Rachel Plant	317	13%	
Green	Chris Melia-Jones	239	9.7%	
Conservative	Brian James Jones	88	3.6%	
TUSC	Lynne Wild	20	0.81%	
Majority		1,495		
Registered electors		9,309		
Turnout		2,477	27%	
Rejected ballots		44		
Labour hold		Swing		

=== Cressington ===
Cressington
Party	Candidate	Votes	%	±%
Labour	Tricia O'Brien	2,168	49%	
Liberal Democrats	Anna Clare Martin	1,358	30%	
Green	Stuart Lindsay Speeden	418	9.4%	
Conservative	Jade Marsden	368	8.3%	
TUSC	Martin Kavanagh	151	3.4%	
Majority		810		
Registered electors		11,489		
Turnout		4,463	39%	
Rejected ballots		43		
Labour hold		Swing		

=== Croxteth ===
Croxteth
Party	Candidate	Votes	%	±%
Labour	Anthony Lavelle	1,984	74%	
UKIP	John David Sisson	261	9.7%	
Liberal Democrats	Angela Hulme	120	4.5%	
Liberal	Raymond Frank Catesby	102	-3.8%	
Green	Yasmin Gasimova	88	3.3%	
Conservative	Denise Mary Nuttall	79	2.9%	
TUSC	Rebecca Elizabeth McCourt	52	1.9%	
Majority		1,723		
Registered electors		10,287		
Turnout		2,686	26%	
Rejected ballots		36		
Labour gain from Independent		Swing		

=== Everton ===
Everton
Party	Candidate	Votes	%	±%
Labour	Frank Prendergast *	2,136	81%	
Green	Ashley Pascal Scott-Griffiths	210	8%	
Liberal	Linda Marion Roberts	185	7%	
Conservative	Kirsten Ann Watson	97	3.7%	
Majority		1,926		
Registered electors		10,319		
Turnout		2,628	25%	
Labour hold		Swing		

=== Fazakerley ===
Fazakerley
Party	Candidate	Votes	%	±%
Labour	Paul Brant *	2,068	73%	
Liberal Democrats	Graham Charles Seddon	294	10%	
UKIP	Enid Lindsay	260	9.1%	
Green	Stephen James Lang	138	4.9%	
Conservative	Christopher Andrew Roland	84	3%	
Majority		1,774		
Registered electors		10,855		
Turnout		2,844	26%	
Rejected ballots		28		
Labour hold		Swing		

=== Greenbank ===
Greenbank
Party	Candidate	Votes	%	±%
Labour	James Alexander Roberts	1,958	57.4%	
Green	David William Morgan	1,030	30.2%	
Liberal Democrats	Joe Harmer	221	6.5%	
Conservative	Nicholas John Leigh Basson	123	3.6%	
TUSC	Connor James Lunt	78	2.3%	
Majority		928		
Registered electors		8,799		
Turnout		3,410	39%	
Rejected ballots		41		
Labour hold		Swing		

=== Kensington and Fairfield ===
Kensington and Fairfield
Party	Candidate	Votes	%	±%
Labour	Liam John Robinson	1,745	71%	
UKIP	Thomas Paul Kangley	260	11%	
Green	Steve Faragher	151	6%	
Liberal Democrats	Bill Barrow	140	5.7%	
Liberal	Michelle Leigh Williams	81	3.3%	
Conservative	Pauline Ann Shuttleworth	47	1.9%	
TUSC	Priyanga Jeyanayagam	34	1.4%	
Majority		1,485		
Registered electors		8,763		
Turnout		2,458	28%	
Rejected ballots		22		
Labour hold		Swing		

=== Kirkdale ===
Kirkdale
Party	Candidate	Votes	%	±%
Labour	Joseph Hanson *	2,166	79%	
TUSC	Roger Bannister	276	10%	
Green	Jonathan Richard Clatworthy	181	6.6%	
Conservative	Stuart Wood	105	3.9%	
Majority		1,890		
Registered electors		10,975		
Turnout		2,728	25%	
Rejected ballots		35		
Labour hold		Swing		

=== Knotty Ash ===
Knotty Ash
Party	Candidate	Votes	%	±%
Labour	Nick Crofts *	1,923	63%	
Liberal Democrats	Norman Mills	436	14%	
UKIP	Adam Giles Heatherington	318	10%	
Green	Fiona Coyne	122	4%	
Conservative	Irene Stuart	119	3.9%	
Liberal	Lindsey Janet Mary Wood	77	2.5%	
TUSC	Craig Foden	58	1.9%	
Majority		1,487		
Registered electors		10,282		
Turnout		3,053	30%	
Rejected ballots		39		
Labour hold		Swing		

=== Mossley Hill ===
Mossley Hill
Party	Candidate	Votes	%	±%
Labour	Emily Elizabeth Spurrell *	1,876	43%	
Liberal Democrats	Paul Philip Childs	1,319	30%	
Green	Ted Grant	869	20%	
Conservative	Christopher Matthew Hall	258	5.9%	
Liberal	David Stanley Wood	83	1.9%	
Majority		557		
Registered electors		9,849		
Turnout		4,405	45%	
Rejected ballots		48		
Labour hold		Swing		

=== Norris Green ===
Norris Green - 2 seats
Party	Candidate	Votes	%	±%
Labour	Sharon Ross	1,733	40%	
Labour	Barry Simon Kushner *	1,701	39%	
UKIP	Jamie Sanderson	300	6.9%	
Green	Martyn Paul Madeley	227	5.2%	
TUSC	Ann Barbara Walsh	197	4.5%	
Conservative	Gillian Michelle Ferrigno	82	1.9%	
Green	Elke Weissmann	73	1.7%	
Conservative	Alma Gavine McGing	61	1.4%	
Majority		1,433		
Registered electors		11,022		
Turnout		2,539	23%	
Rejected ballots		12		
Labour hold		Swing		
Labour hold		Swing		

=== Old Swan ===
Old Swan
Party	Candidate	Votes	%	±%
Labour	Gary Millar *	2,260	69%	
End Austerity - Old Swan Against the Cuts	Martin Ralph	395	12%	
Liberal Democrats	Huw Poston Kentish Dawson	278	8.5%	
Green	Noreen Maguinness	161	4.9%	
Conservative	George Powell	109	3.3%	
Liberal	Marjorie Peel	86	2.6%	
Majority		1,865		
Registered electors		10,875		
Turnout		3,289	30%	
Rejected ballots		66		
Labour hold		Swing		

=== Picton ===
Picton
Party	Candidate	Votes	%	±%
Labour	Nathalie Elizabeth Nicholas *	1,892	73%	
Green	Paul Woodruff	261	10%	
Liberal Democrats	Kevin White	210	8.1%	
TUSC	Frank Bowen	134	5.2%	
Conservative	Laura Elizabeth Watson	95	3.7%	
Majority		1,631		
Registered electors		9,592		
Turnout		2,592	27%	
Rejected ballots		43		
Labour hold		Swing		

=== Prince's Park ===
Prince's Park
Party	Candidate	Votes	%	±%
Labour	Timothy Francis Moore *	1,976	68%	
Green	Stephanie Louise Pitchers	565	19%	
Liberal Democrats	Leo Francis Evans	146	5%	
TUSC	Daren Andrew Ireland	138	4.7%	
Conservative	Alice Margaret Day	100	3.4%	
Majority		1,411		
Registered electors		9,851		
Turnout		2,925	30%	
Rejected ballots		51		
Labour hold		Swing		

=== Riverside ===
Riverside
Party	Candidate	Votes	%	±%
Labour	Steve Munby *	2,606	77%	
Green	Hannah Walkom	365	11%	
Liberal Democrats	Anna McCracken	200	5.9%	
Conservative	Giselle McDonald	121	3.6%	
English Democrat	Michael John Lane	110	3.2%	
Majority		2,606		
Registered electors		12,557		
Turnout		3,402	27%	
Rejected ballots		41		
Labour hold		Swing		

=== St. Michael's ===
St. Michael's
Party	Candidate	Votes	%	±%
Green	Sarah Isabel Jennings *	2,187	62%	
Labour	Steve Fitzsimmons	1,023	29%	
Liberal Democrats	Thomas Sebire	139	3.9%	
Conservative	Dave Patmore	74	2.1%	
English Democrat	Paul Duane Rimmer	53	1.5%	
TUSC	Elsie Kathryn Khan	50	1.4%	
Majority		1,164		
Registered electors		9,399		
Turnout		3,526	38%	
Rejected ballots		32		
Green hold		Swing		

=== Speke-Garston ===
Speke-Garston
Party	Candidate	Votes	%	±%
Labour	Leon Paul Tootle	2,659	79%	
Green	James Joseph Myles	285	8.5%	
Liberal Democrats	Michael Francis Dunne	267	7.9%	
Conservative	Patricia Anita Waddington	157	4.7%	
Majority		2,374		
Registered electors		13,166		
Turnout		3,368	26%	
Rejected ballots		42		
Labour hold		Swing		

=== Tuebrook & Stoneycroft ===
Tuebrook and Stoneycroft
Party	Candidate	Votes	%	±%
Liberal	Steve Radford *	2,871	78%	
Labour	Don Porter	604	16%	
UKIP	Enid Monkcom	70	1.9%	
Green	Martin Sydney Dobson	55	1.5%	
Liberal Democrats	Jerry Lonsdale	54	1.5%	
Conservative	Angela Maria Oates	15	0.41%	
Majority		2,267		
Registered electors		10,042		
Turnout		3,669	37%	
Rejected ballots		10		
Liberal hold		Swing		

=== Warbreck ===
Warbreck
Party	Candidate	Votes	%	±%
Labour	Richard Michael McLinden *	2,166	70%	
Liberal Democrats	Richard John Roberts	435	14%	
Green	Jean Hill	197	6.4%	
English Democrat	Steven McEllenborough	127	4.1%	
Conservative	David Lowe	81	2.6%	
Liberal	George Blacklock Roberts	74	2.4%	
Majority		1,731		
Registered electors		10,975		
Turnout		3,080	28%	
Rejected ballots		31		
Labour hold		Swing		

=== Wavertree ===
Wavertree
Party	Candidate	Votes	%	±%
Labour	Helen Casstles *	1,929	54%	
Liberal Democrats	Donald Macfarlane Turner	690	19%	
Green	Peter Andrew Cranie	415	12%	
Liberal	Pamela Ann Bradley	274	7.6%	
Conservative	Diane Isobel Watson	166	4.6%	
TUSC	Angela Grant	126	3.5%	
Majority		1,239		
Registered electors		10,266		
Turnout		3,600	35%	
Rejected ballots		48		
Labour hold		Swing		

=== West Derby ===
West Derby
Party	Candidate	Votes	%	±%
Labour	Lana Orr *	1,997	59%	
Liberal	Ann Hines	463	14%	
Liberal Democrats	Graham Hulme	332	10%	
UKIP	Stuart John Monkcom	326	9.7%	
Green	Ellie Pontin	132	3.9%	
Conservative	John Ainsley Warson	128	3.8%	
Majority		1,534		
Registered electors		10,904		
Turnout		3,378	31%	
Rejected ballots		32		
Labour hold		Swing		

=== Woolton ===
Woolton
Party	Candidate	Votes	%	±%
Liberal Democrats	Malcolm Robert Kelly	2,206	47%	
Labour	Mark Steven Norris *	1,393	29%	
Conservative	Adam Ernest Marsden	454	9.6%	
Independent	Alan Hutchinson	236	5%	
UKIP	Vivienne Rosalind Beckett	220	4.6%	
Green	Jennifer Mary Brown	185	3.9%	
TUSC	Henry Smith	44	0.93%	
Majority		813		
Registered electors		10,337		
Turnout		4,738	46%	
Rejected ballots		52		
Liberal Democrats gain from Labour		Swing		

=== Yew Tree ===
Yew Tree
Party	Candidate	Votes	%	±%
Labour	John Philip Prince *	2,242	74%	
Conservative	Robert Leslie Albert Poynton	197	6.5%	
TUSC	Charley Cosgrove	171	5.6%	
Liberal Democrats	David Newman	166	5.4%	
Green	William Ward	142	4.7%	
Liberal	Sam Hawksford	131	4.3%	
Majority		2,045		
Registered electors		11,599		
Turnout		3,049	26%	
Rejected ballots		48		
Labour hold		Swing		

== Changes between 2016 and 2018 ==
The resignation of Labour councillor Helen Casstles (Wavertree, elected 5 May 2016) in March 2017 triggered a by-election:

Wavertree by-election, 4 May 2017 (term ends 2020)
Party	Candidate	Votes	%	±%
Labour	Clare Agnes McIntyre	2,632	61.8%	
Liberal Democrats	Joseph Benjamin Harmer	961	22.6%	
Conservative	Stuart Wood	286	6.7%	
Green	Paul Woodruff	270	6.3%	
TUSC	Angela Grant	83	1.9%	
Majority		1,671		
Registered electors				
Turnout				
Rejected ballots		27		
Labour hold		Swing		

The resignation of Labour councillor Beatrice Fraenkel (Kirkdale, elected 7 May 2015) in March 2017 triggered a by-election:

Kirkdale by-election, 8 June 2017 (term ends 2019)
Party	Candidate	Votes	%	±%
Labour	Lisa Gaughan	6,416	90%	
Conservative	Chris Hall	346	4.9%	
Green	Martyn Paul Madeley	177	2.5%	
Liberal Democrats	Rob McAllister-Bell	154	2.2%	
Majority		6,070		
Registered electors		11,783		
Turnout		7,113	60%	
Rejected ballots		20		
Labour hold		Swing		

Councillor Frank Prendergast (Everton, elected 2016) resigned the Labour whip in March 2018.

Labour councillor Jacqui Taylor (Knotty Ash, elected 2015) resigned from the council in March 2018. A by-election will be held for the seat, term ending 2019, along with the ordinary election for the seat in the ward whose term is up, on 3 May 2018.

The death of veteran Labour councillor John McIntosh (Everton, elected 2014) was announced on 29 March 2018. His term would have ended on 3 May 2018 and will be filled at the ordinary election.

== See also ==
- Liverpool City Council
- Liverpool Town Council elections 1835 - 1879
- Liverpool City Council elections 1880–present
- Mayors and Lord Mayors of Liverpool 1207 to present
- History of local government in England
