= 2021 Liverpool City Council election =

- 6 May 2021

30 of 90 seats (one-third) to Liverpool City Council 46 seats needed for a majority
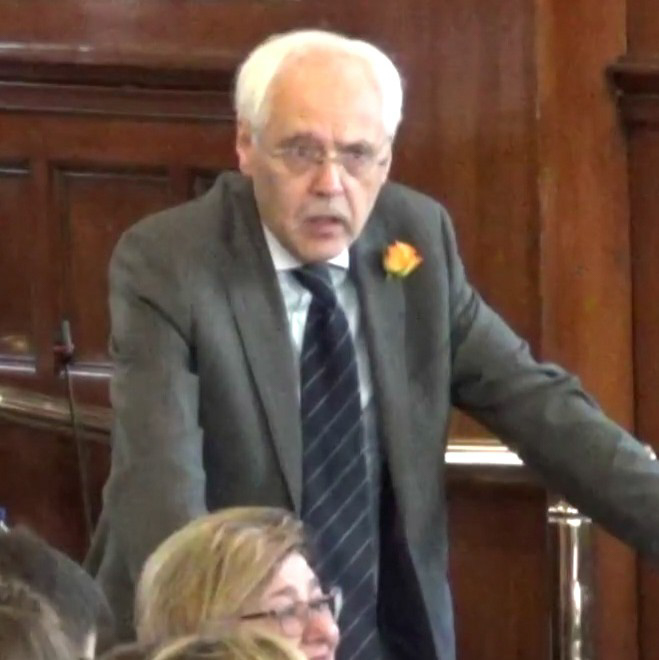

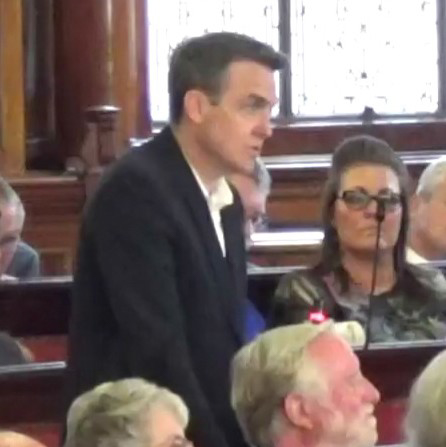

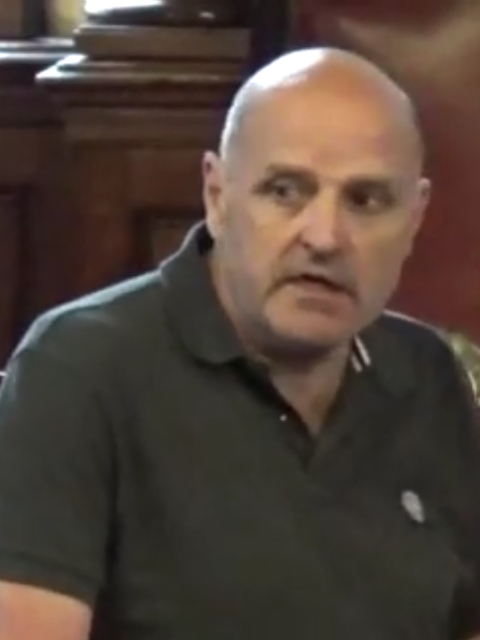
| | First party | Second party |
|---|---|---|
| Leader | | Richard Kemp |
| Party | Labour | Liberal Democrats |
| Leader's seat | | Church |
| Seats before | 72 | 10 |
| Seats after | 70 | 12 |
| Seat change | ▼2 | ▲2 |
| Popular vote | 51,236 | 21,061 |
| Percentage | 50.0% | 20.6% |
| Swing | ▼8.8% | ▲2.6% |
| | Third party | Fourth party |
| Leader | Tom Crone | Steve Radford |
| Party | Green | Liberal |
| Leader's seat | St Michael's | Tuebrook and Stoneycroft |
| Seats before | 4 | 3 |
| Seats after | 4 | 3 |
| Seat change | Steady | Steady |
| Popular vote | 14,342 | 8,114 |
| Percentage | 14.0% | 7.9% |
| Swing | ▲0.6% | ▲3.3% |
- Map showing the results of the 2021 Liverpool City Council election
Control of Council before election
Labour
Elected Control of Council
Labour

The 2021 Liverpool City Council election took place on 6 May 2021 to elect members of Liverpool City Council, alongside other elections across the United Kingdom. One third of the council were up for election, as well as the Mayor of Liverpool, the Metro Mayor of Liverpool City Region and Police and Crime Commissioner Merseyside Police, all covering Liverpool.

== Council composition ==
Before the election the composition of the council was:

↓
| 72 | 10 | 4 | 3 | 1 |
| Lab | LD | G | L | I |

After the election the composition of the council was:

↓
| 70 | 12 | 4 | 3 | 1 |
| Lab | LD | G | L | I |

== Retiring councillors ==
| Council Ward | Departing Councillor | Party | Ref |
|---|---|---|---|
| Childwall | Liz Parsons | Labour | |
| County | Kay Davies | Liberal Democrats | |
| Croxteth | Joann Kushner | Labour | |
| Mossley Hill | Emily Spurrell | Labour | |
| Norris Green | Sharon Ross | Labour | |
| Old Swan | Gary Millar | Labour | |
| Princes Park | Joanne Anderson | Labour | |
| Speke-Garston | Leon Tootle | Labour | |
| West Derby | Lana Orr | Labour | |

== Results summary ==
2021 Liverpool City Council election
| Party | This election | | | Full council | | | This election | | |
| Party | Seats | Net | Seats % | Other | Total | Total % | Votes | Votes % | +/− |
|---|---|---|---|---|---|---|---|---|---|
| Labour | 23 | ▼3 | 74.2 | 47 | 70 | 77.8 | 51,236 | 50.0 | -8.8 |
| Liberal Democrats | 6 | ▲3 | 19.4 | 6 | 12 | 13.3 | 21,061 | 20.6 | +2.6 |
| Green | 1 | Steady | 3.2 | 3 | 4 | 4.4 | 14,342 | 14.0 | +0.6 |
| Liberal | 1 | Steady | 3.2 | 2 | 3 | 3.3 | 8,114 | 7.9 | +3.3 |
| Independent | 0 | Steady | 0.0 | 1 | 1 | 1.1 | 426 | 0.4 | +0.2 |
| Conservative | 0 | Steady | 0.0 | 0 | 0 | 0.0 | 5,864 | 5.7 | +1.7 |
| TUSC | 0 | Steady | 0.0 | 0 | 0 | 0.0 | 686 | 0.7 | New |
| Old Swan Against the Cuts | 0 | Steady | 0.0 | 0 | 0 | 0.0 | 315 | 0.3 | +0.2 |
| NHA | 0 | Steady | 0.0 | 0 | 0 | 0.0 | 137 | 0.1 | New |
| Democrats and Veterans | 0 | Steady | 0.0 | 0 | 0 | 0.0 | 67 | 0.1 | ±0.0 |
| Freedom Alliance | 0 | Steady | 0.0 | 0 | 0 | 0.0 | 67 | 0.1 | New |
| SDP | 0 | Steady | 0.0 | 0 | 0 | 0.0 | 51 | <0.1 | New |
| For Britain | 0 | Steady | 0.0 | 0 | 0 | 0.0 | 49 | <0.1 | New |

== Ward results ==
=== Allerton and Hunts Cross ===
Allerton and Hunts Cross
| Party | Candidate | Votes | % | ±% |
|---|---|---|---|---|
| Liberal Democrats | Mirna Juarez* | 2,244 | 50.26 | ▲12.92 |
| Labour | Mark Steven Norris | 1,451 | 32.50 | ▼18.14 |
| Green | Maggi Williams | 300 | 6.72 | ▼0.64 |
| Conservative | Denise Mary Nuttall | 210 | 4.70 | ▲0.05 |
| Liberal | Niall Hutchinson | 179 | 4.01 | N/A |
| TUSC | Adam Carl Smith | 81 | 1.81 | N/A |
| Majority | | 793 | 17.76 | |
| Registered electors | | 11,536 | | |
| Turnout | | 4,465 | 38.7 | |
| Rejected ballots | | 54 | | |
| Liberal Democrats hold | | Swing | | |

=== Anfield ===
Anfield
| Party | Candidate | Votes | % | ±% |
|---|---|---|---|---|
| Labour | Ros Groves* | 1,520 | 67.38 | ▼5.90 |
| Liberal | Jimmy Richardson | 247 | 10.95 | ▲3.81 |
| Green | Philip Adam Williamson | 171 | 7.58 | ▼2.19 |
| Conservative | Muniandy Logasuriyan Subramaniam | 120 | 5.32 | ▲0.41 |
| Liberal Democrats | Wiebke Angela Hildeguard Ruterjans | 104 | 4.61 | ▼0.30 |
| Independent | Dylan Thomas Cresswell | 94 | 4.17 | N/A |
| Majority | | | | |
| Registered electors | | 9,314 | | |
| Turnout | | 2,256 | 24 | |
| Rejected ballots | | 48 | | |
| Labour hold | | Swing | | |

=== Belle Vale ===
Belle Vale
| Party | Candidate | Votes | % | ±% |
|---|---|---|---|---|
| Labour | Ruth Lillian Bennett* | 2,155 | 68.43 | ▼2.19 |
| Liberal Democrats | Stephen David Atkinson | 447 | 14.19 | ▲7.57 |
| Conservative | Wendy Rose Hine | 220 | 6.99 | ▲3.41 |
| Green | Hilary Brenda McDonagh | 213 | 6.76 | ▲0.94 |
| Freedom Alliance | Neil Sheppard | 67 | 2.13 | N/A |
| Liberal | Marjorie Peel | 47 | 1.49 | ▲0.55 |
| Majority | | 1,708 | | |
| Registered electors | | 11,745 | | |
| Turnout | | 3,419 | 27 | |
| Rejected ballots | | 57 | | |
| Labour hold | | Swing | | |

=== Central ===
Central
| Party | Candidate | Votes | % | ±% |
|---|---|---|---|---|
| Labour | Christine Banks* | 1,209 | 57.03 | ▼3.10 |
| Green | Martyn Paul Madeley | 498 | 23.49 | ▲1.12 |
| Liberal Democrats | Helen Margaret Dietz | 194 | 9.15 | ▼0.32 |
| Conservative | Katie Maria Burgess | 135 | 6.37 | ▼0.28 |
| SDP | Keenan Reece Clough | 51 | 2.41 | N/A |
| Liberal | Bethan Hazel Williams | 33 | 1.56 | ▲0.18 |
| Majority | | 711 | 33.54 | |
| Registered electors | | 13,104 | | |
| Turnout | | 2120 | 16.18 | ▲0.15 |
| Rejected ballots | | 50 | 2.30 | ▲1.26 |
| Labour hold | | Swing | ▼2.11 | |

=== Childwall ===
Childwall
| Party | Candidate | Votes | % | ±% |
|---|---|---|---|---|
| Liberal Democrats | Pat Moloney | 2,329 | 54.68 | ▲2.27 |
| Labour | Betsan Evans | 1,173 | 27.54 | ▼11.00 |
| Green | Helen Alexandra Parker-Jervis | 356 | 8.36 | ▲2.90 |
| Conservative | James Kenton Craig | 207 | 4.86 | ▲2.50 |
| Liberal | Jonathan Mason | 194 | 4.56 | N/A |
| Majority | | 1,156 | 27.14 | ▲13.26 |
| Registered electors | | 10,838 | | |
| Turnout | | 4,259 | 39.3 | |
| Rejected ballots | | 62 | | |
| Liberal Democrats gain from Labour | | Swing | | |

=== Church ===
Church
| Party | Candidate | Votes | % | ±% |
|---|---|---|---|---|
| Liberal Democrats | Andrew Makinson* | 3,080 | 59.12 | ▼1.20 |
| Labour | Simon James Jones | 1,259 | 24.17 | ▼3.53 |
| Green | David Ronald Teasdale | 700 | 13.44 | ▲3.19 |
| Conservative | Peter Andrew | 171 | 3.28 | ▲1.55 |
| Majority | | 1,821 | 34.95 | ▲2.33 |
| Registered electors | | 10,555 | | |
| Turnout | | 5,210 | 49 | |
| Rejected ballots | | 68 | | |
| Liberal Democrats hold | | Swing | | |

=== Clubmoor ===
Clubmoor
| Party | Candidate | Votes | % | ±% |
|---|---|---|---|---|
| Labour | Tim Jeeves* | 1,647 | 62.15 | ▼12.09 |
| Liberal | Liam James Buckley | 510 | 19.25 | ▲10.73 |
| Green | Michael Christopher Stretton | 207 | 7.81 | ▼0.37 |
| Liberal Democrats | Seán Robertson | 147 | 5.55 | ▲0.60 |
| Conservative | Alice Margaret Day | 139 | 5.25 | ▲1.14 |
| Majority | | 1,317 | 42.91 | ▼22.82 |
| Registered electors | | 11,250 | | |
| Turnout | | 2,650 | 23.56 | ▲1.84 |
| Rejected ballots | | 70 | 2.64 | ▲1.32 |
| Labour hold | | Swing | | |

=== County ===
County
| Party | Candidate | Votes | % | ±% |
|---|---|---|---|---|
| Labour | Maureen Patricia Delahunty-Kehoe | 1,608 | 70.50 | ▼7.14 |
| Green | Linda Jeanne Jones | 213 | 9.34 | ▼0.11 |
| Liberal Democrats | Jez Clein | 190 | 8.33 | ▲1.07 |
| Liberal | Irene Lillian Morrison | 142 | 6.23 | ▲3.52 |
| Conservative | Irene Stuart | 128 | 5.61 | ▲2.67 |
| Majority | | 1,397 | | |
| Registered electors | | 9,234 | | |
| Turnout | | 2281 | 24.7 | |
| Rejected ballots | | 67 | | |
| Labour hold | | Swing | | |

=== Cressington ===
Cressington
| Party | Candidate | Votes | % | ±% |
|---|---|---|---|---|
| Liberal Democrats | Richard Clein | 2,448 | 49.45 | ▲8.39 |
| Labour | Tricia O'Brien* | 1,648 | 34.02 | ▼8.62 |
| Green | Jean-Paul Roberts | 560 | 11.31 | ▼0.25 |
| Conservative | Pauline Ann Shuttleworth | 156 | 3.15 | ▼1.59 |
| TUSC | Alex Smith | 102 | 2.06 | N/A |
| Majority | | 764 | 15.43 | |
| Registered electors | | 11,843 | | |
| Turnout | | 4,950 | 41.8 | |
| Rejected ballots | | 80 | 1.62 | |
| Liberal Democrats gain from Labour | | Swing | | |

=== Croxteth ===
Croxteth: 2 seats
| Party | Candidate | Votes | % | ±% |
|---|---|---|---|---|
| Labour | Anthony Patrick Lavelle* | 1,643 | 67.39 | ▼5.73 |
| Labour | Carol Sung | 1,230 | 50.45 | ▼22.67 |
| Liberal | Ray Catesby | 382 | 15.67 | ▲10.07 |
| Liberal | Tom Doolan | 378 | 15.50 | ▲9.90 |
| Green | Nicola Jane Stewart | 243 | 9.97 | ▲0.58 |
| Green | Martin Sydney Dobson | 236 | 9.68 | ▲0.27 |
| Conservative | Johnathan Andrew | 196 | 8.04 | ▲1.65 |
| Liberal Democrats | Pam Clein | 170 | 6.97 | ▲1.59 |
| Liberal Democrats | Kay Davies | 169 | 6.93 | ▲1.46 |
| Conservative | Patricia Anita Waddington | 154 | 6.32 | ▼0.07 |
| Majority | | 1,261 | | |
| Registered electors | | 10,601 | | |
| Turnout | | 4,801 | 23 | |
| Rejected ballots | | 37 | | |
| Labour hold | | Swing | | |
| Labour hold | | Swing | | |

=== Everton ===
Everton
| Party | Candidate | Votes | % | ±% |
|---|---|---|---|---|
| Labour | Alfie Hincks | 1,751 | 65.46 | ▼17.14 |
| Independent | Frank Prendergast* | 286 | 10.69 | N/A |
| Green | Kevin Robinson-Hale | 271 | 10.13 | ▲1.98 |
| Conservative | David William Murray | 166 | 6.21 | ▲3.45 |
| Liberal | Linda Marion Roberts | 101 | 3.78 | ▲1.18 |
| Liberal Democrats | Lisa Ann Nicholson-Smith | 100 | 3.74 | ▼0.15 |
| Majority | | 1,465 | | |
| Registered electors | | 11,141 | | |
| Turnout | | 2,675 | 24 | |
| Rejected ballots | | 72 | | |
| Labour gain from Independent | | Swing | | |

=== Fazakerley ===
Fazakerley
| Party | Candidate | Votes | % | ±% |
|---|---|---|---|---|
| Labour | Paul Brant* | 1,912 | 67.28 | ▼9.83 |
| Liberal Democrats | Stephen Brauner | 336 | 11.82 | ▲7.15 |
| Green | Ceri Rhys Jones | 257 | 9.04 | ▲0.58 |
| Conservative | David Niall Gamble | 204 | 7.18 | ▲0.72 |
| Liberal | Colin Roy Edwards | 133 | 4.68 | ▲1.39 |
| Majority | | 1,576 | | |
| Registered electors | | 11,420 | | |
| Turnout | | 2,842 | 25 | |
| Rejected ballots | | 76 | | |
| Labour hold | | Swing | | |

=== Greenbank ===
Greenbank
| Party | Candidate | Votes | % | ±% |
|---|---|---|---|---|
| Labour | James Roberts* | 1,978 | 53.39 | ▲0.69 |
| Green | Dan Fieldsend | 1,336 | 36.06 | ▼5.24 |
| Liberal Democrats | Fiona McBride | 162 | 4.37 | ▲1.22 |
| Conservative | Chris Hall | 137 | 3.70 | ▲1.48 |
| Independent | Harry Glover | 46 | 1.24 | N/A |
| Liberal | Lindsey Janet Mary Wood | 46 | 1.24 | ▲0.61 |
| Majority | | 642 | | |
| Registered electors | | 10,106 | | |
| Turnout | | 3,705 | 37 | |
| Rejected ballots | | 62 | | |
| Labour hold | | Swing | | |

=== Kensington and Fairfield ===
Kensington and Fairfield
| Party | Candidate | Votes | % | ±% |
|---|---|---|---|---|
| Labour | Liam Robinson* | 1,580 | 67.21 | ▼2.33 |
| Green | Samuel James Cassidy | 263 | 11.19 | ▲4.68 |
| Liberal Democrats | Anna Clare Martin | 178 | 7.57 | ▲0.07 |
| Liberal | Damien Patrick Daly | 175 | 7.44 | ▲3.55 |
| Conservative | Luke Hingley-Smith | 155 | 6.59 | ▲3.97 |
| Majority | | 1,317 | | |
| Registered electors | | 9,392 | | |
| Turnout | | 2.351 | 25 | |
| Rejected ballots | | 56 | | |
| Labour hold | | Swing | | |

=== Kirkdale ===
Kirkdale
| Party | Candidate | Votes | % | ±% |
|---|---|---|---|---|
| Labour | Joseph Hanson* | 1,703 | 59.40 | ▼19.23 |
| Green | Peter Andrew Cranie | 334 | 11.65 | ▲5.60 |
| TUSC | Roger Bannister | 324 | 11.30 | ▲8.50 |
| Liberal Democrats | Mike McAllister-Bell | 231 | 8.06 | ▲4.20 |
| Conservative | Brian James Jones | 168 | 5.86 | ▲4.60 |
| Liberal | Thomas Philip Dunne | 107 | 3.73 | N/A |
| Majority | | 1,369 | 47.75 | |
| Registered electors | | 11,840 | | |
| Turnout | | 2,867 | 24 | |
| Rejected ballots | | 62 | | |
| Labour hold | | Swing | | |

=== Knotty Ash ===
Knotty Ash
| Party | Candidate | Votes | % | ±% |
|---|---|---|---|---|
| Labour | Nick Crofts* | 1,585 | 56.93 | ▼12.77 |
| Liberal Democrats | Alex Cottrell | 380 | 13.65 | ▲3.30 |
| Green | Paul Joseph Corry | 278 | 9.99 | ▲0.93 |
| Conservative | Jigarkhon Hekmat | 277 | 9.95 | ▲2.54 |
| NHA | Stephen McNally | 137 | 4.92 | N/A |
| Liberal | Kenny Russell | 127 | 4.56 | ▲1.07 |
| Majority | | 1,205 | 43.28 | |
| Registered electors | | 10,410 | | |
| Turnout | | 2,784 | 26.78 | |
| Rejected ballots | | 44 | 1.58 | |
| Labour hold | | Swing | | |

=== Mossley Hill ===
Mossley Hill
| Party | Candidate | Votes | % | ±% |
|---|---|---|---|---|
| Liberal Democrats | Robert Charles McAllister-Bell | 2,160 | 46.95 | ▲13.60 |
| Labour | Helen Patricia Stephens | 1,510 | 32.83 | ▼9.89 |
| Green | Julian Garfield Todd | 641 | 13.93 | ▼3.91 |
| Conservative | Millie Gore | 192 | 4.17 | ▲0.11 |
| Liberal | David Stanley Wood | 98 | 2.13 | ▲0.10 |
| Majority | | 650 | 14.13 | ▲4.76 |
| Registered electors | | 9,131 | | ▼3.42 |
| Turnout | | 4,601 | 50.38 | ▲7.16 |
| Rejected ballots | | 84 | 1.82 | ▲1.07 |
| Liberal Democrats gain from Labour | | Swing | ▲11.75 | |

=== Norris Green ===
Norris Green
| Party | Candidate | Votes | % | ±% |
|---|---|---|---|---|
| Labour | Liz Parsons | 1,889 | 69.91 | ▼10.89 |
| Green | Rebecca Lawson | 223 | 8.25 | ▼0.96 |
| Conservative | Alma McGing | 188 | 6.96 | ▲2.49 |
| Liberal | Paul Wynne Jones | 157 | 5.81 | ▲3.59 |
| Liberal Democrats | James Michael Thornhill | 123 | 4.55 | ▲1.25 |
| TUSC | Ann Barbara Walsh | 122 | 4.52 | N/A |
| Majority | | 1,666 | | |
| Registered electors | | 12,759 | | |
| Turnout | | 2,702 | 21.18 | |
| Rejected ballots | | 73 | | |
| Labour hold | | Swing | | |

=== Old Swan ===
Old Swan
| Party | Candidate | Votes | % | ±% |
|---|---|---|---|---|
| Labour | Rona Heron | 1,493 | 47.81 | ▼24.55 |
| Liberal | Mick Coyne | 674 | 21.58 | ▲13.88 |
| Old Swan Against the Cuts | Martin Ralph | 315 | 10.09 | ▲7.08 |
| Green | Mark Damon “Jaz” Jackson | 237 | 7.59 | ▼0.22 |
| Liberal Democrats | Gary Wilson | 235 | 7.52 | ▲1.58 |
| Conservative | Gillian Ferrigno | 169 | 5.41 | ▲2.22 |
| Majority | | 819 | 26.22 | |
| Registered electors | | 11,016 | | |
| Turnout | | 3,123 | 28.35 | |
| Rejected ballots | | 42 | 0.38 | |
| Labour hold | | Swing | | |

=== Picton ===
Picton
| Party | Candidate | Votes | % | ±% |
|---|---|---|---|---|
| Labour | Nathalie Alicia Nicholas* | 1,697 | 65.67 | ▼4.17 |
| Green | Maria Teresa Coughlan | 443 | 17.14 | ▲1.92 |
| Liberal Democrats | Jenny Turner | 198 | 7.66 | ▲0.16 |
| Conservative | Joshua Forrester | 165 | 6.93 | ▲2.62 |
| Liberal | Alan Edward Oscroft | 81 | 3.23 | ▲0.09 |
| Majority | | 1,245 | 10.96 | |
| Registered electors | | 11,445 | | |
| Turnout | | 2,584 | 22.58 | |
| Rejected ballots | | 63 | 2.44 | |
| Labour hold | | Swing | | |

=== Princes Park ===
Princes Park
| Party | Candidate | Votes | % | ±% |
|---|---|---|---|---|
| Labour | Lucille Bernadette Harvey | 2,373 | 70.37 | ▼1.76 |
| Green | Muryam Saffia Aminah Sheikh | 604 | 17.91 | ▼0.44 |
| Liberal Democrats | Peter Joseph Rainford | 191 | 5.66 | ▲0.27 |
| Conservative | Beryl Pinnington | 138 | 4.09 | ▲1.06 |
| Liberal | James Robert Dykstra | 66 | 1.96 | ▲0.87 |
| Majority | | 1,769 | 52.46 | |
| Registered electors | | 11,731 | | |
| Turnout | | 3,372 | 28.74 | |
| Rejected ballots | | 105 | 3.11 | |
| Labour hold | | Swing | | |

=== Riverside ===
Riverside
| Party | Candidate | Votes | % | ±% |
|---|---|---|---|---|
| Labour | Steve Munby* | 2,690 | 67.38 | ▼2.66 |
| Green | Sally Claire Newey | 704 | 17.64 | ▲3.04 |
| Liberal Democrats | Hannah Mary Skaife | 254 | 6.36 | ▼0.06 |
| Conservative | Harry Glen Gallimore-King | 241 | 6.04 | ▲1.57 |
| Liberal | Becky Clancy | 103 | 2.58 | ▲1.74 |
| Majority | | 1,986 | 49.75 | |
| Registered electors | | 15,653 | | |
| Turnout | | 3,992 | 25.50 | |
| Rejected ballots | | 96 | 2.40 | |
| Labour hold | | Swing | | |

=== Speke–Garston ===
Speke–Garston
| Party | Candidate | Votes | % | ±% |
|---|---|---|---|---|
| Labour | Tom Cardwell | 1,857 | 57.67 | ▼22.17 |
| Liberal Democrats | Peter Millea | 575 | 17.86 | ▲11.85 |
| Green | Stefano Mariani | 318 | 9.88 | ▼0.21 |
| Liberal | Becca Doyle | 230 | 7.14 | N/A |
| Conservative | Olivia Lever | 191 | 8.93 | ▲4.88 |
| For Britain | Tony Williams | 49 | 1.52 | N/A |
| Majority | | 1,282 | 39.81 | |
| Registered electors | | 14,260 | | |
| Turnout | | 3,220 | 22.47 | |
| Rejected ballots | | 74 | 2.30 | |
| Labour hold | | Swing | | |

=== St. Michaels ===
St. Michaels
| Party | Candidate | Votes | % | ±% |
|---|---|---|---|---|
| Green | Stephanie Louise Pitchers | 2,308 | 57.79 | ▼9.17 |
| Labour | Portia Eve Fahey | 1,362 | 34.10 | ▲6.56 |
| Conservative | Joseph Bennett | 171 | 4.28 | ▲1.94 |
| Liberal Democrats | Chris Collins | 153 | 3.83 | ▲0.67 |
| Majority | | 946 | 23.69 | |
| Registered electors | | 10,051 | | |
| Turnout | | 3,994 | 39.61 | |
| Rejected ballots | | 57 | 1.43 | |
| Green hold | | Swing | | |

=== Tuebrook and Stoneycroft ===
Tuebrook and Stoneycroft
| Party | Candidate | Votes | % | ±% |
|---|---|---|---|---|
| Liberal | Steve Radford* | 2,364 | 69.78 | ▲1.92 |
| Labour | Dave Barlow | 719 | 21.22 | ▼4.22 |
| Green | Natasha Mary Bradley | 123 | 3.63 | ▲0.67 |
| Conservative | Giselle Henrietta McDonald | 85 | 2.51 | ▲1.49 |
| TUSC | Kieren McHale | 57 | 1.68 | N/A |
| Liberal Democrats | Joseph Robert Slupsky | 40 | 1.18 | ▼1.33 |
| Majority | | 1,645 | 48.55 | |
| Registered electors | | 10,414 | | |
| Turnout | | 3,388 | 32.53 | |
| Rejected ballots | | 46 | 1.36 | |
| Liberal hold | | Swing | | |

=== Warbreck ===
Warbreck
| Party | Candidate | Votes | % | ±% |
|---|---|---|---|---|
| Labour | Alan Albert Gibbons | 2,107 | 67.66 | ▼12.92 |
| Liberal Democrats | Karen Elizabeth Afford | 460 | 14.77 | ▲9.16 |
| Green | John Bernard Cowan Coyne | 247 | 7.93 | ▼0.02 |
| Conservative | Mark Butchard | 226 | 7.26 | ▲3.48 |
| Liberal | George Blacklock Roberts | 74 | 2.38 | ▲0.29 |
| Majority | | 1,647 | 52.89 | |
| Registered electors | | 11,345 | | |
| Turnout | | 3,114 | 27.45 | |
| Rejected ballots | | 84 | 2.70 | |
| Labour hold | | Swing | | |

=== Wavertree ===
Wavertree
| Party | Candidate | Votes | % | ±% |
|---|---|---|---|---|
| Labour | Clare Agnes McIntyre* | 1,579 | 38.82 | ▼14.08 |
| Green | David William Morgan | 1,176 | 28.92 | ▲12.77 |
| Liberal Democrats | Rebecca Tania Turner | 975 | 23.97 | ▲3.40 |
| Conservative | Stuart Wood | 155 | 3.81 | ▼0.33 |
| Liberal | David Harrap | 115 | 2.83 | ▼1.25 |
| Democrats and Veterans | Adam Heatherington | 67 | 1.65 | ▼0.51 |
| Majority | | 403 | 9.91 | ▼22.42 |
| Registered electors | | 10,550 | | |
| Turnout | | 4067 | | |
| Rejected ballots | | 81 | | |
| Labour hold | | Swing | | |

=== West Derby ===
West Derby
| Party | Candidate | Votes | % | ±% |
|---|---|---|---|---|
| Labour | Lila Bennett | 1,662 | 52.78 | ▼15.39 |
| Liberal | Ann Hines | 776 | 22.23 | ▲14.17 |
| Liberal Democrats | Paul John Twigger Parr | 463 | 13.27 | ▲4.41 |
| Green | Elke Weissmann | 303 | 8.68 | ▲0.42 |
| Conservative | Joshua Murphy | 286 | 8.19 | ▲1.54 |
| Majority | | 886 | | |
| Registered electors | | 10,990 | | |
| Turnout | | 3,490 | 32 | |
| Rejected ballots | | 70 | | |
| Labour hold | | Swing | | |

=== Woolton ===
Woolton
| Party | Candidate | Votes | % | ±% |
|---|---|---|---|---|
| Liberal Democrats | Malcolm Robert Kelly* | 2,081 | 46.62 | ▼2.06 |
| Labour | Alice Bennett | 1,251 | 28.02 | ▼8.93 |
| Conservative | Derek Thomas Nuttall | 444 | 9.95 | ▲3.06 |
| Liberal | Alan Hutchinson | 357 | 8.00 | ▼3.00 |
| Green | Eleanor Edith Pontin | 331 | 7.41 | ▼0.08 |
| Majority | | 830 | 18.59 | ▲6.86 |
| Registered electors | | 10,815 | | |
| Turnout | | 4,464 | | |
| Rejected ballots | | 78 | | |
| Liberal Democrats hold | | Swing | | |

=== Yew Tree ===
Yew Tree
| Party | Candidate | Votes | % | ±% |
|---|---|---|---|---|
| Labour | John Philip Prince* | 1,995 | 67.06 | ▼7.87 |
| Conservative | Michael Borman | 270 | 9.08 | ▲3.64 |
| Green | William Ward | 248 | 8.34 | ▲0.15 |
| Liberal Democrats | Alix Joel Roper | 244 | 8.20 | ▲2.32 |
| Liberal | Sam Hawksford | 218 | 7.33 | ▲1.78 |
| Majority | | 1.725 | | |
| Registered electors | | 11,805 | | |
| Turnout | | 2,975 | 25 | |
| Rejected ballots | | 62 | | |
| Labour hold | | Swing | | |

== By-Elections ==
=== Anfield 18 November 2021 ===
Caused by the death of Councillor Ros Groves.

Anfield By-Election 18 November 2021
| Party | Candidate | Votes | % | ±% |
|---|---|---|---|---|
| Labour | Tricia O'Brien | 604 | 55.87 | ▼11.51 |
| Liberal | Jimmy Richardson | 281 | 25.99 | ▲15.04 |
| Liberal Democrats | Wiebke Angela Hildegard Rueterjans | 73 | 6.75 | ▲2.14 |
| Green | Daryl Hodge | 72 | 6.66 | ▼0.92 |
| Conservative | Alma Gavine McGing | 42 | 3.89 | ▼1.43 |
| Independent | Adam Heatherington | 9 | 0.83 | New |
| Majority | | 323 | 29.9 | ▼26.55 |
| Registered electors | | 9,106 | | |
| Turnout | | 1,081 | 11.9 | ▼12.1 |
| Rejected ballots | | 8 | | |
| Labour hold | | Swing | ▼11.51 | |

=== Clubmoor 18 November 2021 ===
Caused by the death of Cllr. Tim Jeeves.

Clubmoor By Election 18 November 2021
| Party | Candidate | Votes | % | ±% |
|---|---|---|---|---|
| Labour | Matthew James Smyth | 787 | 54.50 | ▼7.65 |
| Liberal | Liam James Buckley | 324 | 22.44 | ▲3.19 |
| Independent | Laura-Jayne Wharton | 167 | 11.57 | New |
| TUSC | Ann Barbara Walsh | 54 | 3.74 | New |
| Green | Peter Andrew Cranie | 45 | 3.12 | ▼4.69 |
| Liberal Democrats | Steve Fitzsimmons | 34 | 2.35 | ▼3.20 |
| Conservative | Wendy Hine | 33 | 2.29 | ▼2.96 |
| Majority | | 463 | 32.06 | ▼10.85 |
| Registered electors | | 11,248 | | |
| Turnout | | 1444 | 12.84 | ▼10.72 |
| Rejected ballots | | 4 | | |
| Labour hold | | Swing | ▼7.65 | |

=== Kirkdale 18 November 2021 ===
Caused by the resignation of Malcolm Kennedy, who had been living in Spain for the previous 18 months.

Kirkdale By-Election 18 November 2021
| Party | Candidate | Votes | % | ±% |
|---|---|---|---|---|
| Labour | Dave Hanratty | 852 | 61.69 | ▲2.29 |
| Independent | Peter Furmedge | 171 | 12.38 | New |
| Green | Maria Teresa Coughlan | 160 | 11.59 | ▼0.06 |
| TUSC | Roger Bannister | 84 | 6.08 | ▼5.22 |
| Conservative | Kate Maria Burgess | 57 | 4.13 | ▼1.73 |
| Liberal Democrats | Jenny Turner | 57 | 4.13 | ▼3.93 |
| Majority | | 681 | 49.31 | ▲1.56 |
| Registered electors | | 11,711 | | |
| Turnout | | 1381 | 11.79 | ▼12.43 |
| Rejected ballots | | 4 | | |
| Labour hold | | Swing | ▲2.29 | |

=== Everton 7 April 2022 ===
Caused by the resignation of Councillor Ian Byrne MP, who had been elected as an MP in the December 2019 General Election.

Everton By-Election 7th April 2022
| Party | Candidate | Votes | % | ±% |
|---|---|---|---|---|
| Labour | Ellie Mary Byrne | 925 | 61.96 | ▼3.5 |
| Green | Kevin Robinson-Hale | 362 | 24.25 | ▲10.13 |
| Liberal | Angela Therese Preston | 84 | 5.63 | ▲1.85 |
| Conservative | Wendy Rose Hine | 51 | 3.42 | ▼2.79 |
| TUSC | Roger Bannister | 46 | 3.08 | |
| Liberal Democrats | Steve Fitzsimmons | 25 | 1.67 | ▼2.06 |
| Majority | | 563 | 37.71 | ▼17.62 |
| Registered electors | | 10,961 | | |
| Turnout | | 1,493 | 13.62 | ▼10.39 |
| Rejected ballots | | 12 | | |
| Labour hold | | Swing | ▼3.5 | |

=== Warbreck 7 April 2022 ===
Caused by the resignation of Councillor Cheryl Didsbury.

Warbreck By-Election 7th April 2022
| Party | Candidate | Votes | % | ±% |
|---|---|---|---|---|
| Labour | Sam East | 912 | 48.18 | ▼19.48 |
| Liberal Democrats | Karen Afford | 874 | 46.17 | ▲31.4 |
| Green | Rebecca Lawson | 61 | 3.22 | ▼4.71 |
| Conservative | Mark Butchard | 46 | 3.81 | ▼1.38 |
| Majority | | 38 | 2.01 | ▼50.88 |
| Registered electors | | 11,155 | | |
| Turnout | | 1,893 | 16.97 | ▼10.48 |
| Rejected ballots | | 5 | | |
| Labour hold | | Swing | ▼19.48 | |

=== Fazakerley 30 June 2022 ===
Caused by the resignation of Councillor Lyndsay Melia on 30 March 2022.

Fazakerley By-Election 30th June 2022
| Party | Candidate | Votes | % | ±% |
|---|---|---|---|---|
| Labour | Helen Patricia Stephens | 1,365 | 57.6 | ▼9.73 |
| Independent | Laura Wharton | 638 | 26.9 | New |
| Liberal Democrats | Jack Neville Williams | 290 | 12.2 | ▲0.41 |
| Green | Paul Joseph Corry | 79 | 3.3 | ▼5.71 |
| Majority | | 727 | 30.7 | ▼24.8 |
| Registered electors | | 11,299 | | |
| Turnout | | 2,372 | 20.99% | ▼3.89% |
| Rejected ballots | | 9 | | |
| Labour hold | | Swing | ▼9.73 | |

== See also ==
- Liverpool City Council
- Liverpool Town Council elections 1835 - 1879
- Liverpool City Council elections 1880–present
- Mayors and Lord Mayors of Liverpool 1207 to present
- History of local government in England
- Elections in the United Kingdom
