= 2015 Liverpool City Council election =

- 7 May 2015

31 of 90 seats (One Third and one by-election) to Liverpool City Council 46 seats needed for a majority
- Turnout: 31% (▼48%)
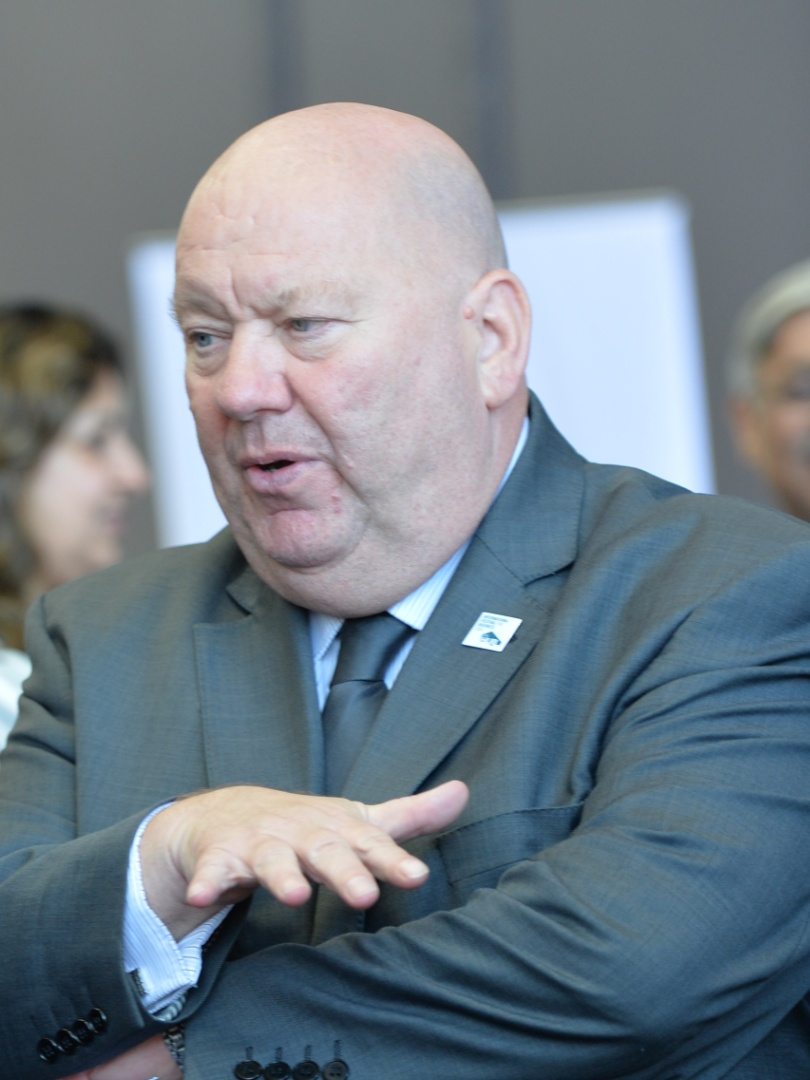

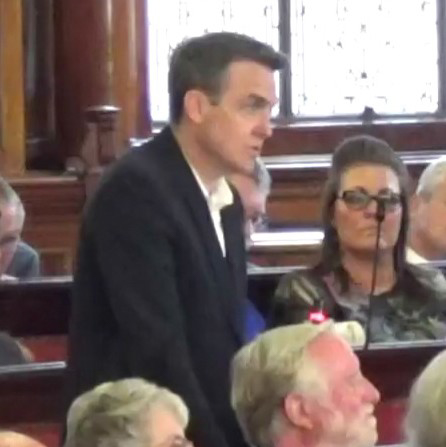

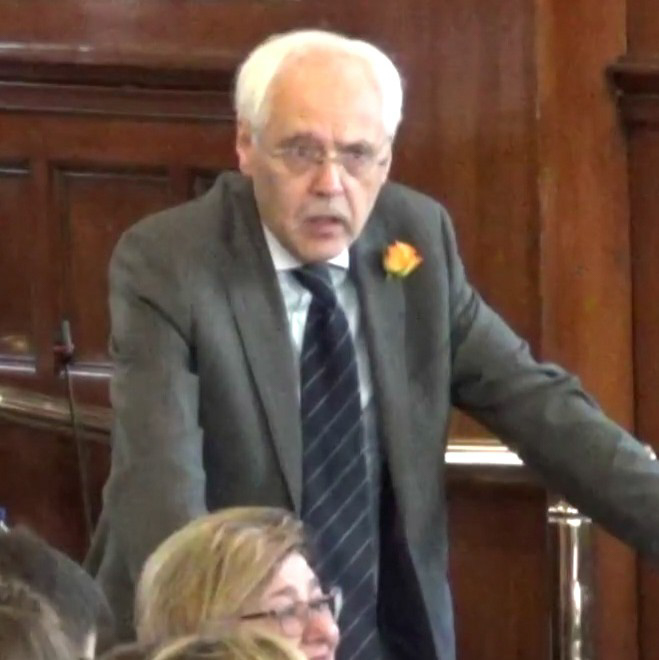

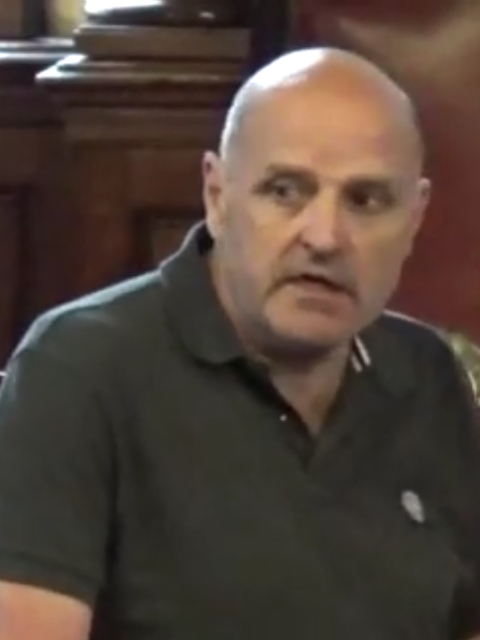
	First party	Second party	Third party
Leader	Joe Anderson	Tom Crone	Richard Kemp
Party	Labour	Green	Liberal Democrats
Leader's seat	N/A, Mayor	St Michael's	Church
Last election	78 seats, 67%	1 seat, 9.7%	1 seat, 16.7%
Seats before	78	4	3
Seats won	29	1	1
Seats after	81	4	2
Seat change	▲1	Steady	▼1
Popular vote	138,624	19,889	16,375
Percentage	67%	9.7%	8.1%
Swing	▲9%	▼1%	▼1.2%
	Fourth party
Leader	Steve Radford
Party	Liberal
Leader's seat	Tuebrook and Stoneycroft
Last election	0 seats, 3.1%
Seats before	3
Seats won	0
Seats after	2
Seat change	Steady
Popular vote	4,384
Percentage	2.1%
Swing	▼2.4%
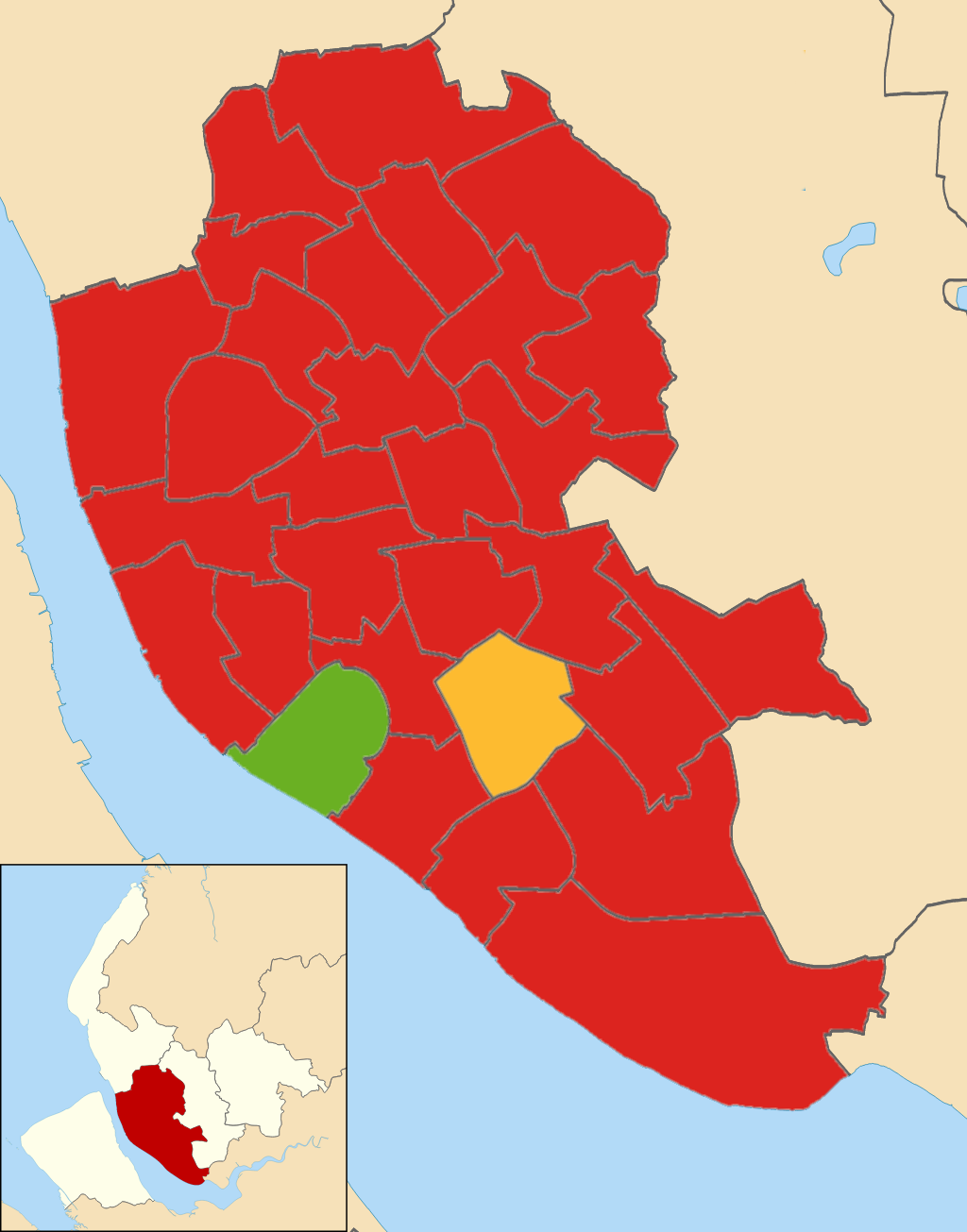
- Map of results of 2015 election
Control of Council before election
Joe Anderson
Labour
Control of Council after Election
Joe Anderson
Labour

The 2015 Liverpool City Council election took place on 7 May 2015 to elect members of Liverpool City Council in England. This was on the same day as other local elections.

Due to the 'in thirds' system of election, one third of the council were up for election, with direct comparisons to previous results made with the corresponding vote at the 2011 Liverpool City Council election.

== Council composition ==
Prior to the election the composition of the council was:

↓
78	4	3	3	2
Lab	G	LD	L	I

After the election the composition of the council was:

↓
81	4	2	2	1
Lab	G	LD	L	I

== Election result ==
Liverpool local election result 2015
Party	Seats	Gains	Losses	Net gain/loss	Seats %	Votes %	Votes	+/−
Labour	29	1	0	+1	94%	67%	138,624	+9%
Green	1	0	0	0	3.2%	9.68%	19,889	-1%
Liberal Democrats	1	0	0	0	3.2%	8.1%	16,661	-1.2%
UKIP	0	0	0	0	0%	6.67%	13,704	
Conservative	0	0	0	0	0%	6.5%	13,380	
Liberal	0	0	1	-1	0%	2.1%	4,384	-2.4%
TUSC	0	0	0	0	0%	0.79%	1,615	
Old Swan Against the Cuts	0	0	0	0	0%	0.21%	437	
Independent	0	0	0	0	0%	0.1%	197	
English Democrat	0	0	0	0	0%	0.09%	179	

== Ward results ==
* - Existing Councillor seeking re-election.

^{(PARTY)} - Party of former Councillor

=== Allerton and Hunts Cross ===
Allerton and Hunts Cross
Party	Candidate	Votes	%	±%
Labour	Sharon Connor	4,339	54.99%	−0.18%
Liberal Democrats	Mirna Juarez	1,474	18.68%	−8.03%
Conservative	Giselle Henrietta Petra McDonald	1,106	14.02%	+5.95%
Green	Neil Patterson	635	8.05%	+5.15%
TUSC	Annie Chambers	237	3.00%	N/A
Liberal	Irene Morrison	100	1.27%	−1.61%
Majority		2,865	36.31%	+7.84%
Registered electors		11,474		
Turnout		7,891	68.77%	+26.23%
Rejected ballots		55		
Labour hold		Swing		

=== Anfield ===
Anfield
Party	Candidate	Votes	%	±%
Labour	Adele Dowling *	4,276	77%	%
UKIP	Stephen Peter Lee	568	10%	%
Liberal	James Richardson	281	5%	%
Green	Shaun Ingram	261	4.6%	%
Conservative	Thomas Roberts	126	2.2%	%
TUSC	Fred Taylor	68	1.2%	%
Majority		3,708		
Registered electors		9,224		
Turnout		5,880	60%	%
Rejected ballots		32		
Labour hold		Swing		

=== Belle Vale ===
Belle Vale
Party	Candidate	Votes	%	±%
Labour	Janet Kent *	5,675	80%	%
UKIP	Carl Sullivan	656	8.8%	%
Conservative	Ben Smith	301	4%	%
TUSC	Roy Dixon	280	3.8%	%
Liberal Democrats	Ian Phillips	257	3.4%	%
Green	Joel Kenyon	224	3%	%
Liberal	Colin Roy Edwards	79	1%	%
Majority		5,019		
Registered electors		11,436		
Turnout		7,472	65%	%
Rejected ballots		24		
Labour hold		Swing		

=== Central ===
Central
Party	Candidate	Votes	%	±%
Labour	Sharron Ann Sullivan *	3,128 *	60%	%
Green	Rachael Joann Blackman	1,004	19%	%
Conservative	Lee Berry	759	15%	%
UKIP	Jamie Sanderson	199	3.8%	%
TUSC	Priyanga Jeyanayagam	94	1.8%	%
Majority		2,124		
Registered electors		10,641		
Turnout		5,184	49%	%
Rejected ballots		26		
Labour hold		Swing		

=== Childwall ===
Childwall
Party	Candidate	Votes	%	±%
Labour	Jeremy Wolfson *	4,424	56%	%
Liberal Democrats	Pat Moloney	1,301	16%	%
UKIP	Shimrit Manning	715	9%	
Conservative	Maria Elaine Prayle	709	8.9%	%
Green	Josie Mullen	608	7.7%	%
TUSC	David Edwards	180	2.3%	%
Majority		3,123		
Registered electors		10,961		
Turnout		8,472	77%	%
Rejected ballots		42		
Labour hold		Swing		

=== Church ===
Church
Party	Candidate	Votes	%	±%
Liberal Democrats	Richard Kemp *	3,808	47%	%
Labour	Liz Parsons	2,957	36%	%
Green	Ted Grant	710	8.7%	%
Conservative	Elizabeth Ann Pearson	363	4.4%	%
UKIP	Christopher Neil Thwaite	272	3.3%	%
TUSC	Jack Robert Yarlett	76	0.93%	%
Majority		851		
Registered electors		10,903		
Turnout		8,186	%	%
Rejected ballots		16		
Liberal Democrats hold		Swing		

=== Clubmoor ===
Clubmoor
Party	Candidate	Votes	%	±%
Labour	Irene Rainey *	5,493	78.18%	%
UKIP	John Sisson	711	10.12%	
Green	Oba Babs-Osibodu	260	3.70%	%
Liberal	Paul Wynne Jones	221	3.15%	%
Conservative	Emilio Antonio Chiquito	184	2.62%	%
Liberal Democrats	Christopher Latimer	157	2.23%	%
Majority		4,782	75.95	
Registered electors		11,116		
Rejected ballots		27		
Turnout		7,026	63%	%
Labour hold		Swing		

=== County ===
County
Party	Candidate	Votes	%	±%
Labour	Roy Gladden *	4,433	77%	%
UKIP	Robert Thompson	473	8.2%	
Liberal Democrats	Karen Afford	346	6%	%
Green	Ashley Scott-Griffiths	274	4.7%	%
Conservative	Brian Jones	130	2.3%	%
Liberal	Stephen Houghland	42	0.73%	
Majority		3,960		
Registered electors		9,518		
Rejected ballots		24		
Turnout		5,781	61%	%
Labour hold		Swing		

=== Cressington ===
Cressington
Party	Candidate	Votes	%	±%
Labour	Bill Jones	4,647	57%	
Liberal Democrats	Anna Martin	1,508	18%	%
Conservative	Jade Marsden	1,038	13%	%
Green	James Myles	870	11%	%
TUSC	Elise Khan	152	1.8%	%
Majority		3,139		
Rejected ballots		56		
Registered electors		11,760		
Turnout		8,215	70%	%
Labour hold		Swing		

=== Croxteth ===
Croxteth
Party	Candidate	Votes	%	±%
Labour	Joann Kushner	4,765	73%	
UKIP	Mark Leavesley	659	10%	
Liberal Democrats	Paul Twigger	352	5.4%	
Conservative	Beryl Pinnington	297	4.5%	
Green	Lewis Coyne	241	3.7%	
TUSC	Mary Ann Wheeler	137	2.1%	
Liberal	John McBride	108	1.6%	
Majority		4,106		
Registered electors		10,484		
Rejected ballots		29		
Turnout		6,559	63%	%
Labour hold		Swing		

=== Everton ===
Everton
Party	Candidate	Votes	%	±%
Labour	Jane Corbett *	4,984	82%	
UKIP	Neil Lawrence Miney	510	8.4%	
Conservative	Angela Maria Oates	201	3.3%	
Green	Fiona Coyne	181	3%	
Liberal	Linda Roberts	117	1.9%	
TUSC	Roger Edwards	92	1.5%	
Majority		4,474		
Registered electors		10,435		
Turnout		6,085	58%	%
Labour hold		Swing		

=== Fazakerley ===
Fazakerley
Party	Candidate	Votes	%	±%
Labour	Peter Clarke *	5,211	41%	
Labour	Paul Brant	4,930	38%	
UKIP	Enid Lindsay	961	7.4%	
Liberal Democrats	Graham Seddon	385	3%	
Conservative	Aaron Hugh Ellis	369	2.8%	
Green	Jennifer Brown	367	2.8%	
Green	Stephen James Lang	366	2.8%	
Conservative	Glyn Derek Nuttall	261	2.8%	
Liberal	Irene Mayes	138	1.1%	
Majority		3,969		
Registered electors		11,154		
Turnout		7,150	64%	%
Rejected ballots		26		
Labour hold		Swing		
Labour hold		Swing		

=== Greenbank ===
Greenbank
Party	Candidate	Votes	%	±%
Labour	Laura Robertson-Collins *	3,375	54%	
Green	David William Morgan	1,837	29%	
Conservative	Nicholas Basson	458	7.3%	
Liberal Democrats	Jeanete Makinson	276	4.4%	
UKIP	Joe Chiffers	220	3.5%	
TUSC	Simon Adam Worthington	85	1.4%	
Majority		1,498		
Registered electors		9,750		
Turnout		6,210	64%	
Rejected ballots		17		
Labour hold		Swing		

=== Kensington and Fairfield ===
Kensington and Fairfield
Party	Candidate	Votes	%	±%
Labour	Wendy Simon *	3,582	69%	
UKIP	Thomas Paul Kangley	570	11%	
Green	Steve Faragher	439	8.6%	
Liberal Democrats	Bill Barrow	214	4.2%	%
Conservative	Holly Nicole Boyd	182	3.6%	
TUSC	Jimmy Tyson	83	1.6%	
Liberal	Shelley Williams	76	1.5%	
Majority		2,958		
Registered electors		8,967		
Turnout		5,092	57%	%
Rejected ballots		25		
Labour hold		Swing		

=== Kirkdale ===
Kirkdale
Party	Candidate	Votes	%	±%
Labour	Beatrice Fraenkel *	5,280	81%	
UKIP	Keith Evans	442	6.7%	
Green	Martyn Madeley	318	4.8%	
TUSC	Roger Bannister	236	3.6%	
Conservative	David Michael John Jeffery	210	3.2%	
Liberal	Tommy Stalker	70	1.1%	
Majority		5,044		
Registered electors		11,140		
Turnout		6,556	59%	
Rejected ballots		25		
Labour hold		Swing		

=== Knotty Ash ===
Knotty Ash
Party	Candidate	Votes	%	±%
Labour	Jacqui Taylor ^{(PARTY)}	4,512	68%	
UKIP	James Swarbrick	714	11%	
Liberal Democrats	Norman Mills	444	6.7%	
Conservative	Irene Stuart	440	6.6%	
Green	Jack Couts	283	4.3%	
Liberal	Marjorie Peel	111	1.7%	
TUSC	Alan David Fogg	100	1.5%	
English Democrat	Derek Francis Grue	16	0.24%	
Majority		3,798		
Registered electors		10,204		
Turnout		6,620	65%	
Rejected ballots		28		
Labour hold		Swing		

=== Mossley Hill ===
Mossley Hill
Party	Candidate	Votes	%	±%
Labour	Patrick Brian Hurley *	3,411	46%	
Green	Martin Jonathan Henshell	1,834	25%	
Liberal Democrats	Paul Childs	1,003	14%	
Conservative	Chris Hall	904	12%	
TUSC	Chris Clayton	108	1.5%	
Liberal	David Stanley Wood	101	1.4%	
Majority		2,408		
Registered electors		9,791		
Turnout		7,361	75%	
Rejected ballots		33		
Labour hold		Swing		

=== Norris Green ===
Norris Green
Party	Candidate	Votes	%	±%
Labour	Alan Walker *	5,297	81%	
UKIP	Neil Martin Kenny	582	9%	
Conservative	Gillian Ferrigno	202	3.1%	
Green	Richard Peter Walsh	196	3%	
TUSC	Ann Barbara Walsh	161	2.4%	
Liberal	Brenda Jean Edwards	122	1.9%	
Majority		4,715		
Registered electors		10,943		
Turnout		6,399	58%	
Rejected ballots		23		
Labour hold		Swing		

=== Old Swan ===
Old Swan
Party	Candidate	Votes	%	±%
Labour	Peter Anthony Brennan	5,244	72%	
UKIP	Leanne Nichola Sheelan	628	8.7%	
Old Swan Against the Cuts	Ralph Martin	437	6%	
Green	Gina Shaw	282	3.9%	
Conservative	George Powell	263	3.6%	
Liberal Democrats	Jackie Wilson	210	2.9%	
Liberal	Sheila Ann Fairclough	186	2.6%	
Majority		4,616		
Registered electors		11,234		
Turnout		7,250	65%	
Rejected ballots		38		
Labour hold		Swing		

=== Picton ===
Picton
Party	Candidate	Votes	%	±%
Labour	Abdul-Basit Qadir *	3,849	69%	
UKIP	Adam Giles Heatherington	362	6.5%	
Liberal Democrats	Kevin White	275	5%	
Conservative	Alma McGing	225	4%	
TUSC	Frank Bowen	159	2.9%	
Majority		3,487		
Registered electors		10,240		
Turnout		5,552	54%	%
Rejected ballots		32		
Labour hold		Swing		

=== Prince's Park ===
Prince's Park
Party	Candidate	Votes	%	±%
Labour	Alan Dean *	3,974	68%	
Green	Dee Coombes	1,214	21%	
Conservative	Alice Margaret Day	242	4.2%	
UKIP	Louis Donnellan	208	3.6%	
TUSC	Daren Andrew Ireland	167	2.9%	
English Democrat	Steven Greenhalgh	19	0.33%	
Majority		2,760		
Registered electors		9,822		
Turnout		5,824	59%	
Rejected ballots		38		
Labour hold		Swing		

=== Riverside ===
Riverside
Party	Candidate	Votes	%	±%
Labour	Michelle Corrigan	5,181	72%	
Green	Hannah Walkom	888	12%	
Conservative	Laura Watson	506	7%	
Liberal Democrats	Michael Francis Dunne	308	4.3%	
TUSC	John Gary Marston	222	3.1%	
English Democrat	Michael John Lane	110	1.5%	
Majority		5,181		
Registered electors		12,184		
Turnout		7,215	59%	
Rejected ballots		46		
Labour hold		Swing		

=== St. Michael's ===
St. Michael's
Party	Candidate	Votes	%	±%
Green	Anna Maria Key	3,266	50%	
Labour	Steve Fitzsimmons	2,384	36%	
Conservative	David Patmore	315	4.8%	
Liberal Democrats	Kris Brown	236	3.6%	
UKIP	Shashwat Singh	222	3.4%	
TUSC	Giorgo Moulas	111	1.7%	
English Democrat	Paul Duane Rimmer	9	0.14%	
Majority		882		
Registered electors		9,648		
Turnout		6,543	68%	%
Rejected ballots		20		
Green hold		Swing		

=== Speke-Garston ===
Speke-Garston
Party	Candidate	Votes	%	±%
Labour	Mary Rasmussen *	6,412	80%	
UKIP	Carl Schears	614	7.7%	
Green	Lee Michael Keegan	401	5%	
Conservative	Derek Thomas Nuttall	332	4.1%	
Liberal Democrats	Timothy David Paul Pollard	253	3.2%	
Majority		6,011		
Registered electors		13,034		
Turnout		8,012	61%	
Rejected ballots		30		
Labour hold		Swing		

=== Tuebrook & Stoneycroft ===
Tuebrook and Stoneycroft
Party	Candidate	Votes	%	±%
Labour	Carol Sung	3,470	53%	
Liberal	Berni Turner ^{(PARTY)}	2,284	35%	
UKIP	Enid Monkcom	316	4.8%	
Green	Joan Margaret Evans	190	2.9%	
Conservative	Robert Leslie Albert Poynton	103	1.6%	
Liberal Democrats	Jerry Lonsdale	98	1.5%	
TUSC	Craig Thomas Pearson	77	1.2%	
Majority		1,186		
Registered electors		10,227		
Turnout		6,538	64%	
Rejected ballots		16		
Labour hold		Swing		

=== Warbreck ===
Warbreck
Party	Candidate	Votes	%	±%
Labour	Ann O'Byrne *	5,379	75%	
UKIP	Joe Gallagher	627	8.8%	
Liberal Democrats	Richard John Roberts	494	6.9%	
Green	Jean Hill	310	4.3%	
Conservative	John Ainsley Watson	202	2.8%	
TUSC	India Francesca Taylor	87	1.2%	
Liberal	George Blacklock Roberts	38	0.53%	
English Democrat	Steven McEllenborough	25	0.35%	
Majority		4,752		
Registered electors		11,226		
Turnout		7,162	64%	
Rejected ballots		31		
Labour hold		Swing		

=== Wavertree ===
Wavertree
Party	Candidate	Votes	%	±%
Labour	Dave Cummings	4,280	60%	
Green	Julie Elizabeth Birch-Holt	821	11%	
Liberal Democrats	Leo Francis Evans	758	11%	
Conservative	Diane Isobel Watson	496	6.9%	
UKIP	Vincent Patrick McDermott	484	6.8%	
TUSC	Angela Grant	181	2.5%	
Independent	Stephen McNally	127	1.8%	
Majority		3,796		
Registered electors		10,522		
Turnout		7,020	67%	
Rejected ballots		30		
Labour hold		Swing		

=== West Derby ===
West Derby
Party	Candidate	Votes	%	±%
Labour	Daniel Barrington *	5,479	72%	
UKIP	Stuart Monkcom	655	8.6%	
Conservative	Pauline Shuttleworth	516	6.8%	
Liberal Democrats	Graham Hulme	341	4.5%	
Liberal	Ann Hines	309	4%	
Green	Simeon Hart	236	3.1%	
TUSC	David Jones	103	1.4%	
Majority		4,824		
Registered electors		11,120		
Turnout		7,639	69%	
Rejected ballots		22		
Labour hold		Swing		

=== Woolton ===
Woolton
Party	Candidate	Votes	%	±%
Labour	Alice Bennett	2,836	38%	
Liberal Democrats	Malcolm Robert Kelly	1,878	25%	
Conservative	Adam Ernest Marsden	1,547	21%	
UKIP	Vivienne Beckett	653	8.8%	
Green	Frances Gina Muscatelli	448	6%	
TUSC	Harry Smith	83	1.1%	
Majority		958		
Registered electors		10,618		
Turnout		7,445	70%	
Rejected ballots		29		
Labour gain from Liberal Democrats		Swing		

=== Yew Tree ===
Yew Tree
Party	Candidate	Votes	%	±%
Labour	Barbara Ann Murray *	5,511	75%	
UKIP	Ian Joseph Hanmer	683	9.3%	
Conservative	Patricia Anita Waddington	403	5.5%	
Liberal Democrats	Angela Hulme	286	3.9%	
Green	Russ Thornton	244	3.3%	
TUSC	Charley Cosgrove	124	1.7%	
Liberal	Sam Hawksford	71	0.97%	
Majority		5,267		
Registered electors		11,734		
Turnout		7,322	62%	
Rejected ballots		38		
Labour hold		Swing		
