= Fazakerley North (Liverpool ward) =

Metropolitan borough council ward in England

- Fazakerley North ward within Liverpool
- Population: 3,963 (2023 electorate)
- Metropolitan borough: City of Liverpool
- Metropolitan county: Merseyside
- Region: North West
- Country: England
- Sovereign state: United Kingdom
- UK Parliament: Liverpool Walton
- Councillors: Declan Henry (Labour)

Fazakerley North ward is an electoral district of Liverpool City Council within the Liverpool Walton constituency.

== Background ==
The ward was created for the elections held on 4 May 2023 following a 2022 review by the Local Government Boundary Commission for England, which decided that the previous 30 wards each represented by three Councillors should be replaced by 64 wards represented by 85 councillors, with varying representation by one, two or three councillors per ward.

The Fazakerley North ward was created as a single-member ward from the north-western segment of the former Fazakerley ward.

The ward boundaries is shaped to follow the following boundary markers;

The south-eastern boundary is marked by the Kirkby branch of the Northern Line between Higher Lane Rail Bridge and the Sefton border.

To the west of Higher Lane, the southern boundary of the ward follows Longmoor Lane, with homes on the southern side of Longmoor Lane sitting within the Fazakerley West Ward. The boundary continues to the crossroad junction with Hall Lane and Long Lane.

The western boundary follows Hall Lane and Warbreck Moor up to the Sefton border.

To the North,the ward shares a border with the southern edge of Aintree Racecourse along the world-famous Melling Road.

The ward contains Kirkdale Cemetery, Seeds Lane Park, and various access points to the Liverpool Loop Line.

The ward includes a number of distinct residential communities around Garden Lane, Barlow's Lane, Albany Road, Greenwich Road, Foxhunter Drive, and the Fazakerley Avenues.

The ward is home to Barlow's Primary School and the Fazakerley & Walton Family Hub.

== Councillors ==
Election	Councillor
2024	Declan Henry (Lab)
2023	Helen Stephens (Lab)

Declan Henry was elected in a by-election on the 4th July 2024, coinciding with the 2024 Parliamentary General Election.

== Election results ==
=== Elections of the 2020s ===
4th July 2024
Party	Candidate	Votes	%	±%
Labour	Declan Henry	1,611	71.38	+ 6.01%
Community Independents	Jean Elizabeth Martin	271	12.01	+ 12.01%
Liberal Democrats	Phil Gavin	194	8.6	− 1.61%
Green	Katie Joanna Jarman	181	8.02	+ 0.01%
Majority		1340	71.38	+22.43%
Turnout		2257	56.14	+30.93%
Rejected ballots		23	1.02	+1.01%
Total ballots		2280	56.72	
Registered electors		4,020		
Labour win				

4th May 2023
Party	Candidate	Votes	%	±%
Labour	Helen Stephens^{§}	653	65.37	
Independent	Barry Thomas Maguire	164	16.42	
Liberal Democrats	Thomas John McAllister	102	10.21	
Green	Amber-Page Moss	80	8.01	
Majority		489	48.95	
Turnout		999	25.21	
Rejected ballots		1	0.1	
Total ballots		1,000	25.23	
Registered electors		3,963		
Labour win (new seat)				

^{§}Helen Stephens was a re-standing councillor from the previous Fazakerley ward.
