= Orrell Park (Liverpool ward) =

Metropolitan borough council ward in Liverpool, England

- Orrell Park ward within Liverpool
- Population: 4,356 (2023 electorate)
- Metropolitan borough: City of Liverpool
- Metropolitan county: Merseyside
- Region: North West
- Country: England
- Sovereign state: United Kingdom
- UK Parliament: Liverpool Walton
- Councillors: Alan Gibbons (Liverpool Community Independents)

Orrell Park ward is an electoral district of Liverpool City Council within the Liverpool Walton constituency.

== Background ==
=== 2023 ward ===
The ward was created for the elections held on 4 May 2023 following a 2022 review by the Local Government Boundary Commission for England, which decided that the previous 30 wards each represented by three Councillors should be replaced by 64 wards represented by 85 councillors with varying representation by one, two or three councillors per ward. The Orrell Park ward was created as a single-member ward from the north-western corner of the former Warbreck ward. The ward boundaries follow the Merseyrail Northern Line Ormskirk branch line, the Langton Dock Branch line, and the city boundary. The ward covers part of the Orrell Park district of Liverpool.

== Councillors ==
Election	Councillor
2023	Alan Gibbons (Liverpool Community Independents)

indicates seat up for re-election after boundary changes.

indicates seat up for re-election.

indicates change in affiliation.

indicates seat up for re-election after casual vacancy.

== Election results ==
=== Elections of the 2020s ===
4th May 2023
Party	Candidate	Votes	%	±%
Liverpool Community Independents	Alan Gibbons	1,428	76.98	
Labour	Mumin Khan	360	19.41	
Liberal Democrats	Collette Marie McAllister	40	2.16	
Conservative	Mark Christopher Butchard	27	1.46	
Majority		1,068	57.57	
Turnout		1,855	42.58	
Rejected ballots		7	0.38	
Total ballots		1,862	42.75	
Registered electors		4,356		
Community Independents win (new seat)				
