= Canning (Liverpool ward) =

Electoral division in England

Coordinates: 53°24′03.1″N 2°57′51.8″W

- Canning ward within Liverpool
- Population: 5,298 (2023 electorate)
- Metropolitan borough: City of Liverpool
- Metropolitan county: Merseyside
- Region: North West
- Country: England
- Sovereign state: United Kingdom
- UK Parliament: Liverpool Riverside
- Councillors: Nathalie Nicholas (Labour); Tomas Logan (Labour)

Canning ward is an electoral district of Liverpool City Council within the Liverpool Riverside Parliamentary constituency.

The ward was created for the elections held on 4 May 2023 following a 2022 review by the Local Government Boundary Commission for England, which decided that the previous 30 wards each represented by three Councillors should be replaced by 64 wards represented by 85 councillors with varying representation by one, two or three councillors per ward. The Canning ward was created as a two-member ward from the parts of the former Central, Picton and Princes Park wards. The ward includes Rodney Street, the Philharmonic Hall, the University of Liverpool, and the Liverpool Women's Hospital The ward boundaries follow Upper Parliament Street, Hope Street, Upper Duke Street, Roscoe Street, Mount Pleasant, Myrtle Street, Grove Street, Irvine Street, and Overbury Street.

== Councillors ==
Election	Councillor	Councillor
2023	Nathalie Nicholas (Lab)	Tomas Logan (Lab)

indicates seat up for re-election after boundary changes.

indicates seat up for re-election.

indicates change in affiliation.

indicates seat up for re-election after casual vacancy.

== Election results ==
=== Elections of the 2020s ===
4th May 2023
Party	Candidate	Votes	%	±%
Labour	Nathalie Nicholas^{§}	628	33.87	
Labour	Tomas Logan^{§}	555	29.94	
Green	Simon Francois Xavier Albert Baron	394	21.25	
Liberal Democrats	Joseph Robert Slupsky	178	9.60	
Independent	Michael Flaherty	99	5.34	
Majority		234		
Turnout				
Rejected ballots		20		
Total ballots				
Registered electors		5,298		
Labour win (new seat)				
Labour win (new seat)				

^{§}Nathalie Nicholas was a re-standing councillor for the former Picton ward. Tomas Logan was a re-standing councillor for the former Princes Park ward.
