= Brownlow Hill (Liverpool ward) =

Electoral district of Liverpool

- Brownlow Hill ward within Liverpool
- Population: 2,846 (2023 electorate)
- Metropolitan borough: City of Liverpool
- Metropolitan county: Merseyside
- Region: North West
- Country: England
- Sovereign state: United Kingdom
- UK Parliament: Liverpool Riverside
- Councillors: Heather Westhead (Labour); Tom Cardwell (Labour)

Brownlow Hill ward is an electoral district of Liverpool City Council within the Liverpool Riverside constituency.

The ward was created for the elections held on 4 May 2023 following a 2022 review by the Local Government Boundary Commission for England, which created the ward to be represented by two councillors. The ward covers most of the eastern half of the former Central ward.

The ward includes Liverpool Lime Street railway station, Liverpool Metropolitan Cathedral, the University of Liverpool and the Royal Liverpool University Hospital. The ward boundaries follow New Islington, Lime Street, Mount Pleasant, Grove Street and Low Hill.

== Councillors ==
Election	Councillor	Councillor
2023	Heather Westhead (Lab)	Tom Cardwell (Lab)

indicates seat up for re-election after boundary changes.

indicates seat up for re-election.

indicates change in affiliation.

indicates seat up for re-election after casual vacancy.

== Election results ==
=== Elections of the 2020s ===
4th May 2023
Party	Candidate	Votes	%	±%
Labour	Heather Westhead	194	34.46	
Labour	Tom Cardwell^{§}	193	34.28	
Green	Michael Christopher Stretton	118	20.96	
Liberal Democrats	Steve Garnett	58	10.30	
Majority		76		
Turnout				
Rejected ballots		6		
Total ballots				
Registered electors		2,846		
Labour win (new seat)				
Labour win (new seat)				

^{§}Tom Cardwell was a re-standing councillor for the Speke-Garston ward.
