= Speke (Liverpool ward) =

Electoral district of Liverpool

- Speke ward within Liverpool
- Population: 9,558 (2023 electorate)
- Metropolitan borough: City of Liverpool
- Metropolitan county: Merseyside
- Region: North West
- Country: England
- Sovereign state: United Kingdom
- UK Parliament: Liverpool Garston
- Councillors: Mary Rasmussen (Labour Party); Doreen Knight (Labour Party)

Speke ward is an electoral division of Liverpool City Council centred on the Speke district of the city.

== Background ==
=== 1953 boundaries ===
1953 Speke ward

The ward was created in for the 1953 elections where it returned three councillors. The ward boundaries followed the River Mersey, the city's eastern boundary and Speke Hall Lane.

=== 1973 boundaries ===
1973 Speke ward

Following the Local Government Act 1972 the ward boundaries of the council were altered. The number of wards was reduced from 40 to 33 and the aldermanic system was abolished. Speke ward was retained and returned three councillors.

=== 1980 boundaries ===
1980 Speke ward

The ward boundary was changed for the 1980 elections. A report of the Local Government Boundary Commission for England published in November 1978 set out proposals for changes to the wards of Liverpool City Council, maintaining the number of councillors at 99 representing 33 wards. Speke ward was represented by three councillors.

The report describes the boundaries as "Commencing at a point where West Road is crossed by the eastern boundary of the City, thence eastwards and southwards along said City boundary to the southern boundary of the City (being low water - River Mersey), thence generally westwards along said boundary to the eastern boundary of St Mary's Ward, thence northwestwards, westwards, northwards and eastwards along said boundary to the point of commencement".

=== 2004 election ===
A review by the Boundary Committee for England recommended that the council was formed of a reduced number of 90 members elected from 30 wards. Speke ward was merged with the former Garston ward to form Speke-Garston.

=== 2023 boundaries ===
The ward was recreated in 2023 following a review by the Local Government Boundary Commission for England which decided that the existing 30 wards each represented by three Councillors should be replaced by 64 wards represented by 85 councillors with varying representation by one, two or three councillors per ward. The Speke ward was reinstated as a two-member ward from the eastern section of the former Speke Garston. The ward boundaries follow the boundary of the Estuary Business Park, Speke Hall Avenue, the West Coast Main Line, the city boundary and the River Mersey. The ward contains Liverpool John Lennon Airport and Speke Hall.

== Councillors ==
| Election | Councillor | Councillor | Councillor |
|---|---|---|---|
2004 - 2022 see SPEKE-GARSTON
| 2023 | Mary Rasmussen (Lab) | Doreen Knight (Lab) | |

indicates seat up for re-election after boundary changes.

indicates seat up for re-election.

indicates change in affiliation.

indicates seat up for re-election after casual vacancy.

== Election results ==
=== Elections of the 2020s ===
4th May 2023
| Party | Candidate | Votes | % | ±% |
|---|---|---|---|---|
| Labour | Mary Rasmussen (Note: Mary Rasmussen was a re-standing councillor for the former Speke-Garston ward.) | 1,307 | 37.18 | |
| Labour | Doreen Knight (Note: Doreen Knight was a re-standing councillor for the former Speke-Garston ward.) | 1,206 | 34.31 | |
| Liverpool Community Independents | Paul David Theobald | 356 | 10.13 | |
| Independent | Anthony Marlow | 217 | 6.17 | |
| Green | Fiona Margaret McGill Coyne | 164 | 4.67 | |
| Liberal Democrats | Elizabeth Patricia McAlliser | 97 | 2.76 | |
| Liberal Democrats | Gerard Stephen McKean | 85 | 2.42 | |
| Independent | Samantha Robinson | 83 | 2.36 | |
| Majority | | 101 | | |
| Turnout | | | | |
| Rejected ballots | | 9 | | |
| Total ballots | | | | |
| Registered electors | | 9,558 | | |
| Labour win (new seat) | | | | |
| Labour win (new seat) | | | | |
