= City Centre South (Liverpool ward) =

Electoral district of Liverpool

- City Centre South ward within Liverpool
- Population: 5,655 (2023 electorate)
- Metropolitan borough: City of Liverpool
- Metropolitan county: Merseyside
- Region: North West
- Country: England
- Sovereign state: United Kingdom
- UK Parliament: Liverpool Riverside
- Councillors: Angela Coleman (Labour); Elizabeth Hayden (Labour); Hetty Wood (Labour)

City Centre South ward is an electoral district of Liverpool City Council within the Liverpool Riverside constituency.

The ward was created for the elections held on 4 May 2023 following a 2022 review by the Local Government Boundary Commission for England, which created the ward to be represented by three councillors. The ward was formed from the northernmost portion of the former Riverside ward and a small section of the former Central ward.

The ward includes Liverpool Cathedral, the Baltic Triangle and the south of Liverpool City Centre, including Liverpool Central railway station, Bold Street and St Luke's Church. The ward boundaries follow Hanover Street, Mount Pleasant, Roscoe Street, Canning Street, Hope Street, Upper Parliament Street, Chaloner Street, Wapping, Strand Street and Liver Street.

== Councillors ==
Election	Councillor	Councillor	Councillor
2023	Angela Coleman (Lab)	Elizabeth Hayden (Lab)	Hetty Wood (Lab)

indicates seat up for re-election after boundary changes.

indicates seat up for re-election.

indicates change in affiliation.

indicates seat up for re-election after casual vacancy.

== Election results ==
=== Elections of the 2020s ===
4th May 2023 - 3 seats
Party	Candidate	Votes	%	±%
Labour	Angela Coleman^{§}	576	23.90	
Labour	Elizabeth Hayden^{§}	525	21.78	
Labour	Hetty Wood^{§}	576	20.71	
Green	Sally Newey	359	14.90	
Independent	Sean Robert Weaver	184	7.63	
Liberal Democrats	Jake Connolly	142	5.89	
NIP	Billie Jo Gibson	125	5.19	
Majority		217		
Turnout				
Rejected ballots		3		
Registered electors		5,655		
Labour win (new seat)				
Labour win (new seat)				
Labour win (new seat)				

^{§}Angela Coleman was a re-standing councillor representing Wavertree ward. Elizabeth Hayden was a re-standing councillor representing Mossley Hill ward. Hetty Wood was a re-standing councillor representing Riverside ward.
