= Wavertree Village (Liverpool ward) =

Metropolitan borough council ward in Liverpool, England

- Wavertree Village ward within Liverpool
- Population: 4,218 (2023 electorate)
- Metropolitan borough: City of Liverpool
- Metropolitan county: Merseyside
- Region: North West
- Country: England
- Sovereign state: United Kingdom
- UK Parliament: Liverpool Wavertree
- Councillors: Laurence Sidorczuk (Lib Dem)

Wavertree Village ward is an electoral district of Liverpool City Council within the Liverpool Wavertree constituency.

== Background ==
=== 2023 ward ===
The ward was created for the elections held on 4 May 2023 following a 2022 review by the Local Government Boundary Commission for England, which decided that the previous 30 wards each represented by three Councillors should be replaced by 64 wards represented by 85 councillors with varying representation by one, two or three councillors per ward. The Wavertree Village ward was created as a single-member ward from the western half of the former Wavertree ward.

The ward boundaries follow Liverpool Manchester Railway, Mill Lane, Wavertree High Street, Prince Alfred Road and the West Coast Main Line. The ward is part of the Wavertree district of Liverpool, and includes Monk's Well, the Wavertree Lock-up, Wavertree Playground, and the Wavertree Sports Park.

== Councillor ==
Election	Councillor
2023	Laurence Sidorczuk (LD)

indicates seat up for re-election after boundary changes.

indicates seat up for re-election.

indicates change in affiliation.

indicates seat up for re-election after casual vacancy.

Laurence Sidorczuk (Liberal Democrat) has represented Wavertree Village since the ward's creation in May 2023. He previously served as a Picton ward councillor between 2004–2010, and was Assistant Cabinet Member for Culture, Media and Sport during Liverpool's tenure as European Capital of Culture in 2008. Sidorczuk sits on Liverpool City Council's Culture and Economy Scrutiny Committee and Merseyside's Police and Crime Panel, providing oversight of the Police and Crime Commissioner. He is the Liverpool Liberal Democrats' spokesperson on culture, sport and major events and a trustee of the St George's Hall Charitable Trust, which works to preserve and enhance the Grade I listed building. Sidorczuk also holds observer status with the Wavertree Society, which seeks to protect the architectural heritage of the district.

== Election results ==
=== Elections of the 2020s ===
4th May 2023
Party	Candidate	Votes	%	±%
Liberal Democrats	Laurence Sidorczuk	547	40.58	
Labour	Joshua Falconer	498	36.94	
Green	Peter Andrew Cranie	175	12.98	
Independent	Paul Filby	85	6.31	
Reform	Adam Giles Heatherington	30	2.23	
Conservative	Laura Suzanne Jeffrey	13	0.96	
Majority		49	3.64	
Turnout		1,348	31.96	
Rejected ballots		4	0.30	
Total ballots		1,352	30.05	
Registered electors		4,218		
Liberal Democrats win (new seat)				
