= Kirkdale East (Liverpool ward) =

Metropolitan borough council ward in England

- Kirkdale East ward within Liverpool
- Population: 2,819 (2023 electorate)
- Metropolitan borough: City of Liverpool
- Metropolitan county: Merseyside
- Region: North West
- Country: England
- Sovereign state: United Kingdom
- UK Parliament: Liverpool Riverside
- Councillors: Tricia O'Brien (Labour)

Kirkdale East ward is an electoral district of Liverpool City Council within the Liverpool Riverside constituency.

== Background ==
The ward was created for the elections held on 4 May 2023 following a 2022 review by the Local Government Boundary Commission for England, which decided that the previous 30 wards each represented by three Councillors should be replaced by 64 wards represented by 85 councillors with varying representation by one, two or three councillors per ward. The Kirkdale East ward was created as a single-member ward from the north-eastern corner of the former Kirkdale ward. The ward boundaries follow Spellow Lane, Walton Lane, Everton Valley, Kirkdale Road, Smith Street, Westminster Road, behind Antonio Street to the junction with Cambridge Road cutting across to Carisbrooke Street. The ward is part of the Kirkdale district of Liverpool, England.

== Councillors ==
Election	Councillor
2023	Tricia O'Brien (Labour)

indicates seat up for re-election after boundary changes.

indicates seat up for re-election.

indicates change in affiliation.

indicates seat up for re-election after casual vacancy.

== Election results ==
=== Elections of the 2020s ===
4th May 2023
Party	Candidate	Votes	%	±%
Labour	Tricia O'Brien (Note: Tricia O'Brien was a re-standing councillor for the former Anfield ward.)	440	81.94	
Liberal Democrats	Julia Margaret Ruth Emelia Shaw	37	6.89	
TUSC	Roger Bannister	34	6.33	
Independent	Giselle Henrietta McDonald	26	4.84	
Majority		403	75.05	
Turnout		537	19.05	
Rejected ballots		3	0.55	
Total ballots		540	34.51	
Registered electors		2,819		
Labour win (new seat)				
