= Springwood (Liverpool ward) =

Metropolitan borough council ward in Liverpool, England

- Springwood ward within Liverpool
- Population: 4,878 (2023 electorate)
- Metropolitan borough: City of Liverpool
- Metropolitan county: Merseyside
- Region: North West
- Country: England
- Sovereign state: United Kingdom
- UK Parliament: Liverpool Garston
- Councillors: Kimberley Berry (Labour)

Springwood ward is an electoral district of Liverpool City Council within the Liverpool Garston constituency.

== Background ==
=== 2023 ward ===
The ward was created for the elections held on 4 May 2023 following a 2022 review by the Local Government Boundary Commission for England, which decided that the previous 30 wards each represented by three Councillors should be replaced by 64 wards represented by 85 councillors with varying representation by one, two or three councillors per ward. The Springwood ward was created as a single-member ward from the western portion of the former Allerton and Hunts Cross ward. The ward boundaries follow Booker Avenue, Menlove Avenue, Heath Road, the southern boundary of Allerton Park Golf Course, Hillfoot Road, the Liverpool to Manchester railway, and the West Coast Main Line. The ward covers Allerton Cemetery, and Clarke's Gardens.

== Councillors ==
| Election | Councillor |
|---|---|
| 2023 | Kimberley Berry (Lab) |

indicates seat up for re-election after boundary changes.

indicates seat up for re-election.

indicates change in affiliation.

indicates seat up for re-election after casual vacancy.

== Election results ==
=== Elections of the 2020s ===
4th May 2023
| Party | Candidate | Votes | % | ±% |
|---|---|---|---|---|
| Labour | Kimberley Berry (Note: Kimberley Berry was a re-standing councillor for the former Allerton and Hunts Cross ward.) | 904 | 57.18 | |
| Liberal Democrats | Stephen Fitzsimmons | 463 | 29.29 | |
| Green | Linda Jeanne Jones | 114 | 7.21 | |
| TUSC | Alex Smith | 56 | 3.54 | |
| Conservative | Andrew Joseph Burgess | 44 | 2.78 | |
| Majority | | 441 | 27.89 | |
| Turnout | | 1,581 | 32.41 | |
| Rejected ballots | | 6 | 0.38 | |
| Total ballots | | 1,587 | 32.53 | |
| Registered electors | | 4,878 | | |
| Labour win (new seat) | | | | |
