= Knotty Ash & Dovecot Park (Liverpool ward) =

Metropolitan borough council ward in England

- Knotty Ash & Dovecot Park ward within Liverpool
- Population: 4,176 (2023 electorate)
- Metropolitan borough: City of Liverpool
- Metropolitan county: Merseyside
- Region: North West
- Country: England
- Sovereign state: United Kingdom
- UK Parliament: Liverpool West Derby
- Councillors: Harry Doyle (Labour)

Knotty Ash and Dovecot Park ward is an electoral district of Liverpool City Council within the Liverpool West Derby constituency.

== Background ==
The ward was created for the elections held on 4 May 2023 following a 2022 review by the Local Government Boundary Commission for England, which decided that the previous 30 wards each represented by three Councillors should be replaced by 64 wards represented by 85 councillors with varying representation by one, two or three councillors per ward. The Knotty Ash & Dovecot ward was created as a single-member ward from a portion of the former Knotty Ash ward. The ward boundaries follow East Prescot Road, between Ashover Avenue and Dinas Lane, along Page Moss Lane, Pilch Lane, behind Gordon Drive, along Thingwall Avenue, Thomas Lane, the North Liverpool Extension Line, the northern boundary of Thomas Lane Playing Fields, and Thomas Lane. The ward is part of the Knotty Ash district of Liverpool, England and contains Dovecot Park.

== Councillors ==
Election	Councillor
2023	Harry Doyle (Labour)

indicates seat up for re-election after boundary changes.

indicates seat up for re-election.

indicates change in affiliation.

indicates seat up for re-election after casual vacancy.

== Election results ==
=== Elections of the 2020s ===
4th May 2023
Party	Candidate	Votes	%	±%
Labour	Harry Doyle (Note: Harry Doyle was a re-standing councillor for the former Knotty Ash ward.)	841	83.60	
Green	Clare Louise O'Meara	59	5.86	
Liberal Democrats	Norman Darbyshire	58	5.77	
Conservative	Alma McGing	48	4.77	
Majority		782	77.74	
Turnout		1,006	24.09	
Rejected ballots		8	0.79	
Total ballots		1,014	24.28	
Registered electors		4,176		
Labour win (new seat)				
