= Festival Gardens (Liverpool ward) =

Metropolitan borough council ward in England

- Festival Gardens ward within Liverpool
- Population: 2,860 (2023 electorate)
- Metropolitan borough: City of Liverpool
- Metropolitan county: Merseyside
- Region: North West
- Country: England
- Sovereign state: United Kingdom
- UK Parliament: Liverpool Riverside
- Councillors: Peter Norris (Labour)

Festival Gardens ward is an electoral district of Liverpool City Council within the Liverpool Riverside constituency.

== Background ==
The ward was created for the elections held on 4 May 2023 following a 2022 review by the Local Government Boundary Commission for England, which decided that the previous 30 wards each represented by three Councillors should be replaced by 64 wards represented by 85 councillors with varying representation by one, two or three councillors per ward. The Festival Gardens ward was created as a single-member ward from the riverside section of the former St Michael's ward, small sections of the former Riverside and Mossley Hill wards. The ward boundaries follow the River Mersey, Brunswick Way, Sefton Street, Grafton Street, behind Garswood Street, Dingle Mount, Dingle Lane, Aigburth Road, Colebrook Road, Ruthin Way, Hindlip Street, the Northern Line, behind Ampthill Road, Aigburth Road and Jericho Lane. The ward contains Kirkdale Cemetery and Seeds Lane Park.

== Councillors ==
Election	Councillor
2023	Peter Norris (Lab)

indicates seat up for re-election after boundary changes.

indicates seat up for re-election.

indicates change in affiliation.

indicates seat up for re-election after casual vacancy.

== Election results ==
=== Elections of the 2020s ===
4th May 2023
Party	Candidate	Votes	%	±%
Labour	Peter Norris	358	36.46	
Green	Maria Teresa Coughlan	357	36.35	
Liberal Democrats	Steve Brauner	241	24.54	
Conservative	Brian Joseph Stewart	26	2.65	
Majority		1	0.11	
Turnout		982	34.34	
Rejected ballots		2	0.20	
Total ballots		984	34.41	
Registered electors		2,860		
Labour win (new seat)				
