= Old Swan West (Liverpool ward) =

Metropolitan borough council ward in Liverpool, England

- Old Swan West ward within Liverpool
- Population: 4,165 (2023 electorate)
- Metropolitan borough: City of Liverpool
- Metropolitan county: Merseyside
- Region: North West
- Country: England
- Sovereign state: United Kingdom
- UK Parliament: Liverpool Wavertree
- Councillors: William Shortall (Labour)

Old Swan West ward is an electoral district of Liverpool City Council within the Liverpool Wavertree constituency.

== Background ==
=== 2023 ward ===
The ward was created for the elections held on 4 May 2023 following a 2022 review by the Local Government Boundary Commission for England, which decided that the previous 30 wards each represented by three Councillors should be replaced by 64 wards represented by 85 councillors with varying representation by one, two or three councillors per ward. The Old Swan West ward was created as a single-member ward from the western part of the former Old Swan ward and a portion of the former Kensington & Fairfield ward covering Liverpool Innovation Park. The ward boundaries follow the Liverpool and Manchester Railway, Innovation Boulevard, behind the Littlewoods Pools building, Edge Lane, the Canada Dock Branch railway line, behind Brelade Road, Menstone Road, Portlet Road and Stoneville Road, Derby Lane, Edge Lane Drive, and Mill Lane. The ward covers part of the Old Swan district of Liverpool.

== Councillors ==
Election	Councillor
2023	William Shortall (Lab)

indicates seat up for re-election after boundary changes.

indicates seat up for re-election.

indicates change in affiliation.

indicates seat up for re-election after casual vacancy.

== Election results ==
=== Elections of the 2020s ===
4th May 2023
Party	Candidate	Votes	%	±%
Labour	William Shortall (Note: William Shortall was a re-standing councillor for the former Old Swan ward.)	679	67.03	
Liverpool Community Independents	Craig Thomas Pearson	122	12.04	
Liberal Democrats	Tony Chalkey	89	8.79	
Green	Joyce Alexandra	79	7.80	
Independent	David Edward Pinnington	44	4.34	
Majority		557	54.99	
Turnout		1,013	24.32	
Rejected ballots		4	0.39	
Total ballots		1,017	24.42	
Registered electors		4,165		
Labour win (new seat)				
