= Waterfront North (Liverpool ward) =

Metropolitan borough council ward in Liverpool, England

- Waterfront North ward within Liverpool
- Population: 864 (2023 electorate)
- Metropolitan borough: City of Liverpool
- Metropolitan county: Merseyside
- Region: North West
- Country: England
- Sovereign state: United Kingdom
- UK Parliament: Liverpool Riverside
- Councillors: Dave Hanratty (Labour)

Waterfront North ward is an electoral district of Liverpool City Council within the Liverpool Riverside constituency.

== Background ==
=== 2023 ward ===
The ward was created for the elections held on 4 May 2023 following a 2022 review by the Local Government Boundary Commission for England, which decided that the previous 30 wards each represented by three Councillors should be replaced by 64 wards represented by 85 councillors with varying representation by one, two or three councillors per ward. The Waterfront North ward was created as a single-member ward from the western side of the former Kirkdale ward.

The ward covers parts of two districts Vauxhall and Kirkdale. The boundaries follow the city boundary at the northern edge of the Canada Dock, Dacre Street and Bedford Place, thereafter St John's Road, the Merseyrail Northern Line, Leeds Street, Paisley Street, the southern edge of the Prince's Half-Tide Dock, and the River Mersey. The ward covers the Port of Liverpool from Canada Dock to the Prince's Half-Tide Dock, the Ten Streets area, Stanley Dock Tobacco Warehouse and Everton Stadium.

The ward has a significantly smaller number of residents than other wards of the city, with a -85% variance from average at the 2019 figures used in the review, at 567. This had increased by the 2023 elections to 864. However, due to the expected significant redevelopment of the docklands it was projected that by 2027 the electorate would be 4,035, representing a -6% variance.

== Councillors ==
Election	Councillor
2023	Dave Hanratty (Lab)

indicates seat up for re-election after boundary changes.

indicates seat up for re-election.

indicates change in affiliation.

indicates seat up for re-election after casual vacancy.

== Election results ==
=== Elections of the 2020s ===
4th May 2023
Party	Candidate	Votes	%	±%
Labour	Dave Hanratty (Note: Dave Hanratty was a re-standing councillor for the former Kirkdale ward.)	91	47.15	
Liberal Democrats	Howard Michael Winik	71	36.79	
Green	Willhelm David Hernandez De Miranda	27	13.99	
Independent	William McGarry	3	1.55	
Independent	Margaret Ryan	1	0.52	
Majority		20	10.36	
Turnout		193	22.34	
Rejected ballots		1	0.52	
Total ballots		194	22.45	
Registered electors		864		
Labour win (new seat)				
