= Everton North (Liverpool ward) =

Metropolitan borough council ward in England

- Everton North ward within Liverpool
- Population: 4,213 (2023 electorate)
- Metropolitan borough: City of Liverpool
- Metropolitan county: Merseyside
- Region: North West
- Country: England
- Sovereign state: United Kingdom
- UK Parliament: Liverpool Riverside
- Councillors: Portia Fahey (Labour)

Everton North ward is an electoral district of Liverpool City Council within the Liverpool Riverside constituency.

The ward was created for the elections held on 4 May 2023 following a 2022 review by the Local Government Boundary Commission for England, which decided that the previous 30 wards each represented by three Councillors should be replaced by 64 wards represented by 85 councillors with varying representation by one, two or three councillors per ward. The Everton North ward was created as a single-member ward from the northern quarter of the former Everton ward. The ward boundaries follow Everton Road, Everton Valley, Walton Breck Road, Oakfield Road, and Breck Road. The ward includes North Liverpool Academy.

== Councillors ==
Election	Councillor
2023	Portia Fahey (Lab)

indicates seat up for re-election after boundary changes.

indicates seat up for re-election.

indicates change in affiliation.

indicates seat up for re-election after casual vacancy.

== Election results ==
=== Elections of the 2020s ===
4th May 2023
Party	Candidate	Votes	%	±%
Labour	Portia Fahey	614	61.96	
Independent	John Marsden	301	30.37	
Green	Kirsty Styles	76	7.67	
Majority		313	31.59	
Turnout		991	23.52	
Rejected ballots		8	0.8	
Total ballots		999	23.71	
Registered electors		4,213		
Labour win (new seat)				
