= Calderstones (Liverpool ward) =

Electoral division in England

Coordinates: 53°23′02.1″N 2°53′34.1″W

- Calderstones ward within Liverpool
- Population: 3,969 (2023 electorate)
- Metropolitan borough: City of Liverpool
- Metropolitan county: Merseyside
- Region: North West
- Country: England
- Sovereign state: United Kingdom
- UK Parliament: Liverpool Garston
- Councillors: Liz Makinson (Liberal Democrat)

Calderstones ward is an electoral district of Liverpool City Council within the Liverpool Garston Parliamentary constituency.

The ward was created for the elections held on 4 May 2023 following a 2022 review by the Local Government Boundary Commission for England, which decided that the previous 30 wards each represented by three Councillors should be replaced by 64 wards represented by 85 councillors with varying representation by one, two or three councillors per ward. The Calderstones ward was created as a single-member ward from the eastern half of the former Church ward with a small section of the former Woolton ward. The ward boundaries follow Queens Drive, Woolton Road, Aldbourne Avenue, Beaconsfield Road, Yew Tree Road and Allerton Road. The ward is named for and includes Calderstones Park.

== Councillors ==
Election	Councillor
2023	Liz Makinson (LD)

indicates seat up for re-election after boundary changes.

indicates seat up for re-election.

indicates change in affiliation.

indicates seat up for re-election after casual vacancy.

== Election results ==
=== Elections of the 2020s ===
4th May 2023
Party	Candidate	Votes	%	±%
Liberal Democrats	Liz Makinson^{§}	1,183	66.65	
Labour	Brian Dowling	354	19.94	
Green	David Ronald Teasdale	167	9.41	
Conservative	Danny Bowman	71	4.00	
Majority		829	46.71	
Turnout		1,775	44.72	
Rejected ballots		3	0.17	
Total ballots		1,778	44.79	
Registered electors		3,969		
Liberal Democrats win (new seat)				

^{§}Liz Makinson was a re-standing councillor for the former Church ward.
