= Fazakerley West (Liverpool ward) =

Metropolitan borough council ward in England

- Fazakerley West ward within Liverpool
- Population: 4,276 (2023 electorate)
- Metropolitan borough: City of Liverpool
- Metropolitan county: Merseyside
- Region: North West
- Country: England
- Sovereign state: United Kingdom
- UK Parliament: Liverpool Walton
- Councillors: Paul Brant (Labour)

Fazakerley West ward is an electoral district of Liverpool City Council within the Liverpool Walton Parliamentary constituency.

== Background ==
The ward was created for the elections held on 4 May 2023 following a 2022 review by the Local Government Boundary Commission for England, which decided that the previous 30 wards each represented by three Councillors should be replaced by 64 wards represented by 85 councillors with varying representation by one, two or three councillors per ward. The Fazakerley West ward was created as a single-member ward from the western quarter of the former Fazakerley ward and a small portion of the former Norris Green ward. The ward boundaries follow Longmoor Lane, Higher Lane, the Kirkby branch of the Northern Line, Longmoor Lane, Lower Lane, the East Lancashire Road, Stopgate Lane, and Lone Lane. The ward contains Aintree University Hospital, Everton Cemetery, and HM Prison Altcourse.

== Councillors ==
Election	Councillor
2023	Paul Brant (Lab)

indicates seat up for re-election after boundary changes.

indicates seat up for re-election.

indicates change in affiliation.

indicates seat up for re-election after casual vacancy.

== Election results ==
=== Elections of the 2020s ===
4th May 2023
Party	Candidate	Votes	%	±%
Labour	Paul Brant^{§}	696	77.59	
Liberal Democrats	John Powell	147	16.39	
Conservative	Jeremy Whitaker Lowe	54	6.02	
Majority		549	61.20	
Turnout		897	20.98	
Rejected ballots		10	1.10	
Total ballots		907	21.21	
Registered electors		4,276		
Labour win (new seat)				

^{§}Paul Brant was a re-standing councillor for Fazakerley ward.
