= Tuebrook Breckside Park (Liverpool ward) =

Metropolitan borough council ward in Liverpool, England

- Tuebrook Breckside Park ward within Liverpool
- Population: 3,639 (2023 electorate)
- Metropolitan borough: City of Liverpool
- Metropolitan county: Merseyside
- Region: North West
- Country: England
- Sovereign state: United Kingdom
- UK Parliament: Liverpool West Derby
- Councillors: Joe Dunne (Liberal)

Tuebrook Breckside Park ward is an electoral district of Liverpool City Council within the Liverpool West Derby Parliamentary constituency.

== Background ==
=== 2023 ward ===
The ward was created for the elections held on 4 May 2023 following a 2022 review by the Local Government Boundary Commission for England, which decided that the previous 30 wards each represented by three Councillors should be replaced by 64 wards represented by 85 councillors with varying representation by one, two or three councillors per ward. The Tuebrook Breckside Park ward was created as a single-member ward from the north-western portion of the former Tuebrook and Stoneycroft ward and a small portion of the former Anfield ward. The ward boundaries follow Townsend Lane, the Canada Dock Branch line, West Derby Road, Belmont Road, Belmont Grove, behind Ellencliff Drive and Sedley Street.

== Councillors ==
Election	Councillor
2023	Joe Dunne (Lib)

indicates seat up for re-election after boundary changes.

indicates seat up for re-election.

indicates change in affiliation.

indicates seat up for re-election after casual vacancy.

== Election results ==
=== Elections of the 2020s ===
4th May 2023
Party	Candidate	Votes	%	±%
Liberal	Joe Dunne (Note: Joe Dunne was a re-standing councillor for the former Tuebrook and Stoneycroft ward.)	416	55.76	
Labour	Max Peter Robert Barlow	266	35.66	
Green	Jennifer Mary Brown	41	5.50	
Liberal Democrats	Jenny Elizabeth Collins	23	3.08	
Majority		150	20.10	
Turnout		746	20.50	
Rejected ballots		6	0.80	
Total ballots		752	20.67	
Registered electors		3,639		
Liberal win (new seat)				
