= Greenbank Park (Liverpool ward) =

Metropolitan borough council ward in England

- Greenbank Park ward within Liverpool
- Population: 4,004 (2023 electorate)
- Metropolitan borough: City of Liverpool
- Metropolitan county: Merseyside
- Region: North West
- Country: England
- Sovereign state: United Kingdom
- UK Parliament: Liverpool Wavertree
- Councillors: Martyn Madeley (Green)

Greenbank Park ward is an electoral district of Liverpool City Council within the Liverpool Wavertree constituency.

== Background ==
The ward was created for the elections held on 4 May 2023 following a 2022 review by the Local Government Boundary Commission for England, which decided that the previous 30 wards each represented by three Councillors should be replaced by 64 wards represented by 85 councillors with varying representation by one, two or three councillors per ward. The Greenbank Park ward was created as a single-member ward from most of the former Greenbank ward and a small portion of the former Mossley Hill ward. The ward boundaries follow Ullet Road (excluding Holt House), Smithdown Road, the West Coast Mainline, Rose Lane, Elmswood Road, and Mossley Hill Drive. The ward contains and is named for Greenbank Park, as well as the University of Liverpool's Greenbank Halls of Residence, Greenbank Synagogue, and Liverpool College.

== Councillors ==
Election	Councillor
2023	Martyn Madeley (Green)

indicates seat up for re-election after boundary changes.

indicates seat up for re-election.

indicates change in affiliation.

indicates seat up for re-election after casual vacancy.

== Election results ==
=== Elections of the 2020s ===
4th May 2023
Party	Candidate	Votes	%	±%
Green	Martyn Paul Madeley	660	45.21	
Labour	Tom Clements	536	36.71	
Liberal Democrats	Seb Regnier-Wilson	226	15.48	
Conservative	Peter Andrew	38	2.60	
Majority		124	8.5	
Turnout		1,460	36.46	
Rejected ballots		3	0.21	
Total ballots		1463	36.54	
Registered electors		4,004		
Green win (new seat)				
