= Croxteth Country Park (Liverpool ward) =

Metropolitan borough council ward in England

Croxteth County Park
- Croxteth Country Park ward within Liverpool
- Population: 5,064 (2023 electorate)
- Metropolitan borough: City of Liverpool
- Metropolitan county: Merseyside
- Region: North West
- Country: England
- Sovereign state: United Kingdom
- UK Parliament: Liverpool West Derby
- Councillors: Lila Bennett (Labour)

Croxteth Country Park ward is an electoral district of Liverpool City Council within the Liverpool West Derby constituency.

The ward was created for the elections held on 4 May 2023 following a 2022 review by the Local Government Boundary Commission for England, which decided that the previous 30 wards each represented by three Councillors should be replaced by 64 wards represented by 85 councillors with varying representation by one, two or three councillors per ward. The Croxteth Country Park ward was created as a single-member ward from the eastern half of the former Croxteth ward. The ward is centred around the Croxteth Park estate and includes Croxteth Hall.

== Councillors ==
Election	Councillor
2023	Lila Bennett (Lab)

indicates seat up for re-election after boundary changes.

indicates seat up for re-election.

indicates change in affiliation.

indicates seat up for re-election after casual vacancy.

== Election results ==
=== Elections of the 2020s ===
4th May 2023
Party	Candidate	Votes	%	±%
Labour	Lila Bennett	836	59.12	
Liverpool Community Independents	Michael Williams	297	21.00	
Liberal Democrats	Pamela Clein	117	8.27	
Green	David Paul Kelly	90	6.36	
Conservative	Katie Maria Burgess	74	5.23	
Majority		539	38.12	
Turnout		1,414	27.92	
Rejected ballots		4	0.28	
Total ballots		1,418	28.00	
Registered electors		5,064		
Labour win (new seat)				
