= Waterfront South (Liverpool ward) =

Metropolitan borough council ward in Liverpool, England

- Waterfront South ward within Liverpool
- Population: 2,263 (2023 electorate)
- Metropolitan borough: City of Liverpool
- Metropolitan county: Merseyside
- Region: North West
- Country: England
- Sovereign state: United Kingdom
- UK Parliament: Liverpool Riverside
- Councillors: Rebecca Turner (Lib Dem)

Waterfront South ward is an electoral district of Liverpool City Council within the Liverpool Riverside constituency.

== Background ==
=== 2023 ward ===
The ward was created for the elections held on 4 May 2023 following a 2022 review by the Local Government Boundary Commission for England, which decided that the previous 30 wards each represented by three Councillors should be replaced by 64 wards represented by 85 councillors with varying representation by one, two or three councillors per ward. The Waterfront South ward was created as a single-member ward from the riverfront areas of the former Central and Riverside wards.

The ward has a smaller number of residents than other wards of the city, with a -59% variance from average at the 2019 figures used in the review, at 1,586. This had increased by the 2023 elections to 2,263. However, due to the expected significant redevelopment of the docklands it was projected that by 2027 the electorate would be 4,241, representing a -1% variance.

The ward boundaries follow the southern edge of the Prince's Half-Tide Dock, Bath Street, New Quay, George's Dock Gates, The Strand, Strand Street, Wapping, Chaloner Street, Sefton Street, Brunswick Way and the River Mersey. The ward covers the Liverpool Waterfront including the Liver Building, Royal Albert Dock, Liverpool, Liverpool Arena, Liverpool Marina and the Port of Liverpool between Princes Dock and Brunswick Dock.

== Councillors ==
Election	Councillor
2023	Rebecca Turner (Lib Dem)

indicates seat up for re-election after boundary changes.

indicates seat up for re-election.

indicates change in affiliation.

indicates seat up for re-election after casual vacancy.

== Election results ==
=== Elections of the 2020s ===
4th May 2023
Party	Candidate	Votes	%	±%
Liberal Democrats	Rebecca Turner	259	46.58	
Labour	Patrick Hurley (Note: Patrick Hurley was a re-standing councillor for the former Mossley Hill ward.)	210	37.77	
Green	Christopher Coughlan	87	15.65	
Majority		49	8.81	
Turnout		556	24.57	
Rejected ballots		8	1.42	
Total ballots		564	24.92	
Registered electors		2,263		
Liberal Democrats win (new seat)				
