= Gateacre (Liverpool ward) =

Metropolitan borough council ward in England

- Gateacre ward within Liverpool
- Population: 4,834 (2023 electorate)
- Metropolitan borough: City of Liverpool
- Metropolitan county: Merseyside
- Region: North West
- Country: England
- Sovereign state: United Kingdom
- UK Parliament: Liverpool Garston
- Councillors: Kris Brown (Liberal Democrat)

Gateacre ward is an electoral district of Liverpool City Council within the Liverpool Garston Parliamentary constituency.

== Background ==
The ward was created for the elections held on 4 May 2023 following a 2022 review by the Local Government Boundary Commission for England, which decided that the previous 30 wards each represented by three Councillors should be replaced by 64 wards represented by 85 councillors with varying representation by one, two or three councillors per ward. The Gateacre ward was created as a single-member ward from the north-eastern third of the former Woolton ward, small sections of the former Childwall and Belle Vale wards. The ward boundaries follow the North Liverpool Extension Line, Herdman Close, Gorsewood Road, Belle Vale Road, Gateacre Brow, Rose Brow, Woolton Road, around Childwall Woods, Childwall Lane, and Score Lane.

== Councillors ==
Election	Councillor
2023	Kris Brown (LD)

indicates seat up for re-election after boundary changes.

indicates seat up for re-election.

indicates change in affiliation.

indicates seat up for re-election after casual vacancy.

== Election results ==
=== Elections of the 2020s ===
4th May 2023
Party	Candidate	Votes	%	±%
Liberal Democrats	Kris Brown^{§}	935	56.43	
Labour	Maureen Catherine McDaid	512	30.90	
Green	Eleanor Edith Pontin	122	7.36	
Conservative	Giselle Henrietta McDonald	88	5.31	
Majority		423	25.53	
Turnout		1,657	34.28	
Rejected ballots		11	0.66	
Total ballots		1,668	34.51	
Registered electors		4,834		
Liberal Democrats win (new seat)				

^{§}Kris Brown was a re-standing councillor for Woolton ward.
