= Clubmoor West (Liverpool ward) =

Metropolitan borough council ward in England

- Clubmoor West within Liverpool
- Population: 4,349 (2023 electorate)
- Metropolitan borough: City of Liverpool
- Metropolitan county: Merseyside
- Region: North West
- Country: England
- Sovereign state: United Kingdom
- UK Parliament: Liverpool Walton
- Councillors: Si Jones (Labour)

Clubmoor West ward is an electoral district of Liverpool City Council within the Liverpool Walton constituency.

The ward was created for the elections held on 4 May 2023 following a 2022 review by the Local Government Boundary Commission for England, which decided that the previous 30 wards each represented by three Councillors should be replaced by 64 wards represented by 85 councillors with varying representation by one, two or three councillors per ward. The Clubmoor West ward was created as a single-member ward from the western half of the former Clubmoor ward and a small part of the former County ward. The ward boundaries follow Walton Hall Avenue, Richard Kelly Drive, Queens Drive, Muirhead Avenue, the North Liverpool Extension Line, and Cherry Lane.

== Councillors ==
Election	Councillor
2023	Si Jones (Lab)

indicates seat up for re-election after boundary changes.

indicates seat up for re-election.

indicates change in affiliation.

indicates seat up for re-election after casual vacancy.

== Election results ==
=== Elections of the 2020s ===
4th May 2023
Party	Candidate	Votes	%	±%
Labour	Si Jones	739	72.31	
Independent	Kevin Morland	189	18.49	
Green	Joseph Rynhart	62	6.07	
Conservative	Mundher Mohammed Salem Ba Shammakh	32	3.13	
Majority		550	53.82	
Turnout		1,022	23.50	
Rejected ballots		5	0.11	
Total ballots		1027	23.61	
Registered electors		4,349		
Labour win (new seat)				
