= Fazakerley East (Liverpool ward) =

Metropolitan borough council ward in England

- Fazakerley ward within Liverpool
- Population: 5,916 (2021 census)
- Registered Electors: 4,179 (2023 election)
- Metropolitan borough: City of Liverpool
- Metropolitan county: Merseyside
- Region: North West
- Country: England
- Sovereign state: United Kingdom
- UK Parliament: Liverpool Walton
- Councillors: Debbie Cooke (Labour Party)

Fazakerley East ward is an electoral district of Liverpool City Council within the Liverpool Walton constituency.

The ward was created for the elections held on 4 May 2023 following a 2022 review by the Local Government Boundary Commission for England, which decided that the previous 30 wards each represented by three Councillors should be replaced by 64 wards represented by 85 councillors with varying representation by one, two or three councillors per ward. The Fazakerley East ward was created as a single-member ward from the eastern half of the former Fazakerley ward.

The ward boundaries follow the Kirkby branch of the Northern Line, Longmoor Lane, Lower Lane, the East Lancashire Road, Knowsley Book, the River Alt, Bridgehouse Lane, Aintree Lane and Sherwood's Lane.

The population of the ward at the 2021 census was 5,916.

== Councillors ==
Election	Councillor
2023	Frazer Lake (Lab)^{[a]}
2023	Debbie Cooke (Lab)

indicates seat up for re-election after boundary changes.

indicates seat up for re-election.

indicates change in affiliation.

indicates seat up for re-election after casual vacancy.

=== Notes ===
a. Cllr Frazer Lake (Labour, 2023) resigned from the council on 3 August 2023 citing conflicting work commitments.

== Election results ==
=== Elections of the 2020s ===
Fazakerley East by-election: Thursday 14 September 2023
Party	Candidate	Votes	%	±%
Labour	Debbie Cooke	350	40.94	▼26.78
Liverpool Community Independents	Jean Elizabeth Martin	258	30.18	▼2.10
Liberal Democrats	Kayleigh Halpin	148	17.31	N/A
Independent	Barry Maguire	87	10.18	N/A
Conservative	Katie Maria Burgess	12	1.40	N/A
Majority		92	10.76	▼24.68
Turnout		855	20.32	▼0.21
Rejected ballots		1	0.12	▼0.46
Total ballots		856	20.34	
Registered electors		4,208		
Labour hold		Swing	-12.34	

4th May 2023
Party	Candidate	Votes	%	±%
Labour	Frazer Lake (Note: Frazer Lake was a re-standing councillor for the former Fazakerley ward.)	581	67.72	
Liverpool Community Independents	Alfie Hinks (Note: Alfie Hinks was a re-standing councillor for the former Everton ward.)	277	32.28	
Majority		304	35.44	
Turnout		858	20.53	
Rejected ballots		5	0.58	
Total ballots		863	20.65	
Registered electors		4,179		
Labour win (new seat)				
