= Woolton Village (Liverpool ward) =

Metropolitan borough council ward in Liverpool, England

- Woolton Village ward within Liverpool
- Population: 4,113 (2023 electorate)
- Metropolitan borough: City of Liverpool
- Metropolitan county: Merseyside
- Region: North West
- Country: England
- Sovereign state: United Kingdom
- UK Parliament: Liverpool Garston
- Councillors: Malcolm Kelly (Lib Dem)

Woolton Village ward is an electoral district of Liverpool City Council within the Liverpool Garston constituency.

== Background ==
=== 2023 ward ===
The ward was created for the elections held on 4 May 2023 following a 2022 review by the Local Government Boundary Commission for England, which decided that the previous 30 wards each represented by three Councillors should be replaced by 64 wards represented by 85 councillors with varying representation by one, two or three councillors per ward. The Woolton Village ward was created as a single-member ward from the southwestern half of the former Woolton ward.

The ward boundaries follow Woolton Road, Rose Brow, Acrefield Road, Woolton High Street, Menlove Avenue, the northern boundary of Allerton Manor Golf Club, Yewtree Road, Beaconsfield Road, the boundary of St Francis Xavier's College, behind Aldbourne Close, and Aldbourne Avenue. The ward is part of the Woolton district of Liverpool, and includes the Black Woods, Reynold Park, and 251 Menlove Avenue.

== Councillors ==
Election	Councillor
2023	Malcolm Kelly (LD)

indicates seat up for re-election after boundary changes.

indicates seat up for re-election.

indicates change in affiliation.

indicates seat up for re-election after casual vacancy.

== Election results ==
=== Elections of the 2020s ===
4th May 2023
Party	Candidate	Votes	%	±%
Liberal Democrats	Malcolm Kelly (Note: Malcolm Kelly was a re-standing councillor for the former Woolton ward.)	862	56.41	
Labour	Audrey Faidhnait Gaffney	406	26.57	
Green	Philip Adam Williamson	147	9.62	
Conservative	David William Murray	113	7.40	
Majority		456	29.84	
Turnout		1,528	37.15	
Rejected ballots		10	0.65	
Total ballots		1,538	37.39	
Registered electors		4,113		
Liberal Democrats win (new seat)				
