= Tuebrook Larkhill (Liverpool ward) =

Metropolitan borough council ward in Liverpool, England

- Tuebrook Larkhill ward within Liverpool
- Population: 4,821 (2023 electorate)
- Metropolitan borough: City of Liverpool
- Metropolitan county: Merseyside
- Region: North West
- Country: England
- Sovereign state: United Kingdom
- UK Parliament: Liverpool West Derby
- Councillors: Billy Lake (Liberal)

Tuebrook Larkhill ward is an electoral district of Liverpool City Council within the Liverpool West Derby Parliamentary constituency.

== Background ==
=== 2023 ward ===
The ward was created for the elections held on 4 May 2023 following a 2022 review by the Local Government Boundary Commission for England, which decided that the previous 30 wards each represented by three Councillors should be replaced by 64 wards represented by 85 councillors with varying representation by one, two or three councillors per ward. The Tuebrook Larkhill ward was created as a single-member ward from the north-eastern portion of the former Tuebrook and Stoneycroft ward and a small portion of the former Clubmoor ward. The ward boundaries follow Townsend Lane, Queens Drive, West Derby Road, and the Canada Dock Branch line.

== Councillors ==
Election	Councillor
2023	Billy Lake (Lib)

indicates seat up for re-election after boundary changes.

indicates seat up for re-election.

indicates change in affiliation.

indicates seat up for re-election after casual vacancy.

== Election results ==
=== Elections of the 2020s ===
4th May 2023
Party	Candidate	Votes	%	±%
Liberal	Billy Lake (Note: Billy Lake was a re-standing councillor for the former Tuebrook and Stoneycroft ward.)	724	57.78	
Labour	Dave Barlow	479	38.23	
Liberal Democrats	Francis Stanley Roderick	33	2.63	
Conservative	Brian James Jones	17	1.36	
Majority		245	19.55	
Turnout		1,253	25.99	
Rejected ballots		9	0.71	
Total ballots		1,262	26.17	
Registered electors		4,821		
Liberal win (new seat)				
