= Kirkdale West (Liverpool ward) =

Metropolitan borough council ward in England

- Kirkdale West ward within Liverpool
- Population: 4,105 (2023 electorate)
- Metropolitan borough: City of Liverpool
- Metropolitan county: Merseyside
- Region: North West
- Country: England
- Sovereign state: United Kingdom
- UK Parliament: Liverpool Riverside
- Councillors: Joe Hanson (Labour)

Kirkdale West ward is an electoral district of Liverpool City Council within the Liverpool Riverside constituency.

== Background ==
The ward was created for the elections held on 4 May 2023 following a 2022 review by the Local Government Boundary Commission for England, which decided that the previous 30 wards each represented by three Councillors should be replaced by 64 wards represented by 85 councillors with varying representation by one, two or three councillors per ward. The Kirkdale West ward was created as a single-member ward from a portion of the former Kirkdale ward. The ward boundaries follow Westminster Road, Smith Street, Great Mersey Street, Commercial Road, Boundary Street, the Northern Line (Southport branch) to Kings Road and thereafter behind Orlando Street. The ward is part of the Kirkdale district of Liverpool, England and contains Kirkdale and Bank Hall railway stations.

== Councillors ==
Election	Councillor
2023	Joe Hanson (Labour)

indicates seat up for re-election after boundary changes.

indicates seat up for re-election.

indicates change in affiliation.

indicates seat up for re-election after casual vacancy.

== Election results ==
=== Elections of the 2020s ===
4th May 2023
Party	Candidate	Votes	%	±%
Labour	Joe Hanson (Note: Joe Hanson was a re-standing councillor for the former Kirkdale ward.)	738	80.83	
Green	Toby James Irving	89	9.75	
Independent	Leanne O'Shea	86	9.42	
Majority		649	71.08	
Turnout		913	22.24	
Rejected ballots		4	0.44	
Total ballots		917	22.34	
Registered electors		4,105		
Labour win (new seat)				
