= Clubmoor East (Liverpool ward) =

Metropolitan borough council ward in England

- Clubmoor East within Liverpool
- Population: 4,485 (2023 electorate)
- Metropolitan borough: City of Liverpool
- Metropolitan county: Merseyside
- Region: North West
- Country: England
- Sovereign state: United Kingdom
- UK Parliament: Liverpool Walton
- Councillors: Richard McLean (Labour)

Clubmoor East ward is an electoral district of Liverpool City Council within the Liverpool Walton constituency.

The ward was created for the elections held on 4 May 2023 following a 2022 review by the Local Government Boundary Commission for England, which decided that the previous 30 wards each represented by three Councillors should be replaced by 64 wards represented by 85 councillors with varying representation by one, two or three councillors per ward. The Clubmoor East ward was created as a single-member ward from the parts of the former Clubmoor ward. The ward boundaries follow Queens Drive, Richard Kelly Drive, Walton Hall Avenue, Parthenon Drive, Townsend Avenue, the North Liverpool Extension Line, and Muirhead Avenue.

== Councillors ==
Election	Councillor
2023	Louise Ashton (Lab)^{[a]}
2024	Richard McLean (Lab)

indicates seat up for re-election after boundary changes.

indicates seat up for re-election.

indicates change in affiliation.

indicates seat up for re-election after casual vacancy.

== Election results ==
=== Elections of the 2020s ===
4th May 2023
Party	Candidate	Votes	%	±%
Labour	Louise Ashton	607	71.33	
Liberal	Alan Oscroft	95	11.16	
Independent	Peter John Grimes	94	11.05	
Green	Martin Dunschen	55	6.46	
Majority		512	60.17	
Turnout		851	18.97	
Rejected ballots		4	0.47	
Total ballots		855	19.06	
Registered electors		4,485		
Labour win (new seat)				

=== Clubmoor East By-Election 4th July 2024 ===
Caused by the resignation of Cllr. Louise Ashton

Clubmoor East (1 seat)
Party	Candidate	Votes	%	±%
Labour	Richard David McLean	1,666	79%	▲7.7%
Green	Peter Andrew Cranie	202	9.6%	▲3.14%
Liberal	Alan Edward Oscroft	125	5.9%	▼5.3
Liberal Democrats	Liz Brookes	116	5.5%	new
Majority		1,464		▲
Registered electors		4,606		
Turnout		2,109		▲ %
Rejected ballots		59		
Labour hold		Swing	▼1%	
