= West Derby Deysbrook (Liverpool ward) =

Metropolitan borough council ward in Liverpool, England

- West Derby Deysbrook ward within Liverpool
- Population: 4,475 (2023 electorate)
- Metropolitan borough: City of Liverpool
- Metropolitan county: Merseyside
- Region: North West
- Country: England
- Sovereign state: United Kingdom
- UK Parliament: Liverpool West Derby
- Councillors: John Prince (Labour)

West Derby Deysbrook ward is an electoral district of Liverpool City Council within the Liverpool West Derby constituency.

== Background ==
=== 2023 ward ===
The ward was created for the elections held on 4 May 2023 following a 2022 review by the Local Government Boundary Commission for England, which decided that the previous 30 wards each represented by three Councillors should be replaced by 64 wards represented by 85 councillors with varying representation by one, two or three councillors per ward. The West Derby Deysbrook ward was created as a single-member ward from the western half of the former Yew Tree ward and a small part of the former West Derby ward.

The ward boundaries follow the southern boundary of Croxteth Park, Princess Drive, Yew Tree Lane, behind Yew Tree Close and St Andrews Avenue, Leyfield Road and Town Row. The ward is part of the West Derby district of Liverpool, and includes West Derby Golf Course, St Vincent's School and Blackmoor Park Infants School.

== Councillors ==
Election	Councillor
2023	John Prince (Lab)

indicates seat up for re-election after boundary changes.

indicates seat up for re-election.

indicates change in affiliation.

indicates seat up for re-election after casual vacancy.

== Election results ==
=== Elections of the 2020s ===
4th May 2023
Party	Candidate	Votes	%	±%
Labour	John Prince (Note: John Prince was a re-standing councillor for the former Yew Tree ward.)	814	66.29	
Independent	Stephen Riley	165	13.44	
Liberal Democrats	Daniel Clein	111	9.04	
Green	Brian Bishop	93	7.57	
Conservative	Danny Dougherty	45	3.66	
Majority		649	52.85	
Turnout		1,228	27.44	
Rejected ballots		6	0.49	
Total ballots		1,234	27.58	
Registered electors		4,475		
Labour win (new seat)				
