= Garston (Liverpool ward) =

Electoral district of Liverpool

- Garston ward within Liverpool
- Population: 8,072 (2023 electorate)
- Metropolitan borough: City of Liverpool
- Metropolitan county: Merseyside
- Region: North West
- Country: England
- Sovereign state: United Kingdom
- UK Parliament: Liverpool Garston
- Councillors: Sam Gorst (Liverpool Community Independents); Lucy Williams (Liverpool Community Independents)

Garston ward is an electoral division of Liverpool City Council centred on the Garston district of the city. It was created in 1902 where three councillors were elected. It was dissolved in 1953.

The ward was recreated in 2023 following a review by the Local Government Boundary Commission for England which decided that the existing 30 wards each represented by three Councillors should be replaced by 64 wards represented by 85 councillors with varying representation by one, two or three councillors per ward. The Garston ward was reinstated as a two-member ward from the western half of the former Speke Garston ward and the southern half of the former Cressington ward. The ward contains the Port of Garston, Garston Leisure Centre, and the New Mersey Shopping Park.

== Councillors ==
Election	Councillor	Councillor	Councillor
1953 - 2022 WARD DISESTABLISHED
2023	Sam Gorst (LCI)	Lucy Williams (LCI)	

indicates seat up for re-election after boundary changes.

indicates seat up for re-election.

indicates change in affiliation.

indicates seat up for re-election after casual vacancy.

== Election results ==
=== Elections of the 2020s ===
4th May 2023
Party	Candidate	Votes	%	±%
Community Independents	Sam Gorst^{§}	1,470	26.08	
Community Independents	Lucy Williams	1,159	20.56	
Labour	Sharon Connor^{§}	1,022	18.13	
Labour	Richard David McLean	832	14.76	
Liberal Democrats	Peter Millea	579	10.27	
Liberal Democrats	Mike McAllister-Bell	430	7.63	
Green	Helene Margaret Bridget Santamera	145	2.57	
Majority		448		
Turnout				
Rejected ballots		7		
Total ballots				
Registered electors		8,072		
Community Independents win (new seat)				
Community Independents win (new seat)				

^{§}Sam Gorst was a re-standing councillor for the former Cressington ward. Sharon Connor was a re-standing councillor for the former Allerton and Hunts Cross ward.
