= Old Swan East (Liverpool ward) =

Metropolitan borough council ward in Liverpool, England

- Old Swan East ward within Liverpool
- Population: 4,151 (2023 electorate)
- Metropolitan borough: City of Liverpool
- Metropolitan county: Merseyside
- Region: North West
- Country: England
- Sovereign state: United Kingdom
- UK Parliament: Liverpool West Derby
- Councillors: Mark Johnson (Labour)

Old Swan East ward is an electoral district of Liverpool City Council within the Liverpool West Derby constituency.

== Background ==
=== 2023 ward ===
The ward was created for the elections held on 4 May 2023 following a 2022 review by the Local Government Boundary Commission for England, which decided that the previous 30 wards each represented by three Councillors should be replaced by 64 wards represented by 85 councillors with varying representation by one, two or three councillors per ward. The Old Swan East ward was created as a single-member ward from the north-eastern part of the former Old Swan ward. The ward boundaries follow Queens Drive, Oakhill Road, behind Cunningham Drive, Edge Lane Drive, St Oswald's Street, and Derby Lane. The ward covers part of the Old Swan and Stoneycroft Districts.

== Councillors ==
| Election | Councillor |
|---|---|
| 2023 | Mark Johnson (Lab) |

indicates seat up for re-election after boundary changes.

indicates seat up for re-election.

indicates change in affiliation.

indicates seat up for re-election after casual vacancy.

== Election results ==
=== Elections of the 2020s ===
4th May 2023
| Party | Candidate | Votes | % | ±% |
|---|---|---|---|---|
| Labour | Mark Anthony Johnson | 615 | 47.64 | |
| Liberal | Mick Coyne | 462 | 35.79 | |
| Liberal Democrats | Alex Cottrell | 65 | 5.03 | |
| Green | Charlotte Mia Corke | 64 | 4.96 | |
| Old Swan Against the Cuts | Martin Ralph | 60 | 4.65 | |
| Conservative | Chris Hall | 25 | 1.94 | |
| Majority | | 153 | 11.85 | |
| Turnout | | 1,291 | 31.10 | |
| Rejected ballots | | 8 | 0.62 | |
| Total ballots | | 1,299 | 31.29 | |
| Registered electors | | 4,151 | | |
| Labour win (new seat) | | | | |
