= Wavertree Garden Suburb (Liverpool ward) =

Metropolitan borough council ward in Liverpool, England

- Wavertree Garden Suburb ward within Liverpool
- Population: 3,976 (2023 electorate)
- Metropolitan borough: City of Liverpool
- Metropolitan county: Merseyside
- Region: North West
- Country: England
- Sovereign state: United Kingdom
- UK Parliament: Liverpool Wavertree
- Councillors: Julie Fadden (Labour)

Wavertree Garden Suburb ward is an electoral district of Liverpool City Council within the Liverpool Wavertree constituency.

== Background ==
=== 2023 ward ===
The ward was created for the elections held on 4 May 2023 following a 2022 review by the Local Government Boundary Commission for England, which decided that the previous 30 wards each represented by three Councillors should be replaced by 64 wards represented by 85 councillors with varying representation by one, two or three councillors per ward. The Wavertree Garden Suburb ward was created as a single-member ward from the north-eastern half of the former Wavertree ward and a portion of the former Childwall ward.

The ward boundaries follows Edge Lane Drive, Queens Drive, Childwall Road, and Mill Lane. The ward is part of the Wavertree district of Liverpool, and includes Childwall School.

== Councillors ==
Election	Councillor
2023	Julie Fadden (Lab)

indicates seat up for re-election after boundary changes.

indicates seat up for re-election.

indicates change in affiliation.

indicates seat up for re-election after casual vacancy.

== Election results ==
=== Elections of the 2020s ===
4th May 2023
Party	Candidate	Votes	%	±%
Labour	Julie Fadden	564	37.68	
Liberal Democrats	Rob Verity	521	34.80	
Independent	Stephen McNally	153	10.22	
Green	David William Morgan	121	8.08	
Liberal	Alan Tormey (Note: Alan Tormey was a re-standing councillor for the former Childwall ward, elected as a Liberal Democrat.)	114	7.62	
Conservative	Carl Robert Cross	24	1.60	
Majority		43	2.88	
Turnout		1,497	37.66	
Rejected ballots		6	0.40	
Total ballots		1,503	37.80	
Registered electors		3,976		
Labour win (new seat)				
