= West Derby Muirhead (Liverpool ward) =

Metropolitan borough council ward in Liverpool, England

- West Derby Muirhead ward within Liverpool
- Population: 4,395 (2023 electorate)
- Metropolitan borough: City of Liverpool
- Metropolitan county: Merseyside
- Region: North West
- Country: England
- Sovereign state: United Kingdom
- UK Parliament: Liverpool West Derby
- Councillors: Colette Goulding (Labour)

West Derby Muirhead ward is an electoral district of Liverpool City Council within the Liverpool West Derby constituency.

== Background ==
=== 2023 ward ===
The ward was created for the elections held on 4 May 2023 following a 2022 review by the Local Government Boundary Commission for England, which decided that the previous 30 wards each represented by three Councillors should be replaced by 64 wards represented by 85 councillors with varying representation by one, two or three councillors per ward. The West Derby Muirhead ward was created as a single-member ward from the north-eastern part of the former West Derby ward and part of the former Croxteth ward.

The ward boundaries follow Storrington Avenue, Worrow Road, behind Carr Lane East, Croxteth Hall Lane, the southern boundary of Croxteth Park, behind Town Row to West Derby Village, Almonds Green, Muirhead Avenue East, and Dwerryhouse Lane. The ward is part of the West Derby district of Liverpool, and includes Croxteth Park and De La Salle Academy.

== Councillors ==
Election	Councillor
2023	Colette Goulding (Lab)

indicates seat up for re-election after boundary changes.

indicates seat up for re-election.

indicates change in affiliation.

indicates seat up for re-election after casual vacancy.

== Election results ==
=== Elections of the 2020s ===
4th May 2023
Party	Candidate	Votes	%	±%
Labour	Colette Maria Goulding	716	51.59	
Liberal	David Maher	419	30.19	
Liberal Democrats	Ian Phillips	126	9.08	
Green	Harvey Brown	87	6.27	
Conservative	Gillian Michelle Ferrigno	40	2.88	
Majority		297	21.40	
Turnout		1,388	31.58	
Rejected ballots		13	0.93	
Total ballots		1,401	31.88	
Registered electors		4,395		
Labour win (new seat)				
