= West Derby Leyfield (Liverpool ward) =

Metropolitan borough council ward in Liverpool, England

- West Derby Leyfield ward within Liverpool
- Population: 4,752 (2023 electorate)
- Metropolitan borough: City of Liverpool
- Metropolitan county: Merseyside
- Region: North West
- Country: England
- Sovereign state: United Kingdom
- UK Parliament: Liverpool West Derby
- Councillors: Finley Nolan (Labour)

West Derby Leyfield ward is an electoral district of Liverpool City Council within the Liverpool West Derby constituency.

== Background ==
=== 2023 ward ===
The ward was created for the elections held on 4 May 2023 following a 2022 review by the Local Government Boundary Commission for England, which decided that the previous 30 wards each represented by three Councillors should be replaced by 64 wards represented by 85 councillors with varying representation by one, two or three councillors per ward. The West Derby Leyfield ward was created as a single-member ward from parts of the former Knotty Ash, West Derby, and Yew Tree wards.

The ward boundaries follow Town Row, Leyfield Road, Yew Tree Road, behind St Vincent's School, around but not including Stanier Close, behind Kingsheath Avenue, East Prescot Road and Eaton Road. The ward is part of the West Derby district of Liverpool, and includes Cardinal Heenan Catholic High School, Broughton Hall High School and the Zoe's Place Baby Hospice.

== Councillors ==
Election	Councillor
2023	Finley Nolan (Lab)

indicates seat up for re-election after boundary changes.

indicates seat up for re-election.

indicates change in affiliation.

indicates seat up for re-election after casual vacancy.

== Election results ==
=== Elections of the 2020s ===
4th May 2023
Party	Candidate	Votes	%	±%
Labour	Finley Nolan	865	48.35	
Liberal Democrats	Norman Mills	792	44.27	
Green	Patricia Anne Goodwin	100	5.59	
Conservative	Danny Crichton	32	1.79	
Majority		73	4.08	
Turnout		1,789	37.65	
Rejected ballots		7	0.39	
Total ballots		1,796	37.79	
Registered electors		4,752		
Labour win (new seat)				
