= Sandfield Park (Liverpool ward) =

Metropolitan borough council ward in Liverpool, England

- Sandfield Park ward within Liverpool
- Population: 4,888 (2023 electorate)
- Metropolitan borough: City of Liverpool
- Metropolitan county: Merseyside
- Region: North West
- Country: England
- Sovereign state: United Kingdom
- UK Parliament: Liverpool West Derby
- Councillors: Joanne Kennedy (Labour Party (UK))

Sandfield Park ward is an electoral district of Liverpool City Council within the Liverpool West Derby constituency.

== Background ==
=== 2023 ward ===
The ward was created for the elections held on 4 May 2023 following a 2022 review by the Local Government Boundary Commission for England, which decided that the previous 30 wards each represented by three Councillors should be replaced by 64 wards represented by 85 councillors with varying representation by one, two or three councillors per ward. The Sandfield Park ward was created as a single-member ward from the western quarter of the former West Derby ward and the north-western corner of the former Knotty Ash ward. The ward boundaries follow Muirhead Avenue, Almonds Green, Barnfield Drive, Eaton Road, Thomas Lane then behind Thomas Lane Playing Field, the North Liverpool Extension Line, Alder Road, and Queens Drive. The ward includes Alder Hey Children's Hospital, St Edward's College and Holly Lodge Girls' College.

== Councillors ==
| Election | Councillor |
|---|---|
| 2023 | Joanne Kennedy (Lab) |

indicates seat up for re-election after boundary changes.

indicates seat up for re-election.

indicates change in affiliation.

indicates seat up for re-election after casual vacancy.

== Election results ==
=== Elections of the 2020s ===
4th May 2023
| Party | Candidate | Votes | % | ±% |
|---|---|---|---|---|
| Labour | Joanne Marie Kennedy | 775 | 55.08 | |
| Liberal | Liam James Buckley | 288 | 20.47 | |
| Liberal Democrats | James Michael Thornhill | 181 | 12.86 | |
| Green | Kay Alexandra Inckle | 105 | 7.53 | |
| Conservative | Pauline Ann Shuttleworth | 57 | 4.05 | |
| Majority | | 487 | 34.61 | |
| Turnout | | 1,407 | 28.78 | |
| Rejected ballots | | 4 | 0.28 | |
| Total ballots | | 2,045 | 28.87 | |
| Registered electors | | 4,888 | | |
| Labour win (new seat) | | | | |
