= Everton West (Liverpool ward) =

Metropolitan borough council ward in England

- Everton West ward within Liverpool
- Population: 2,903 (2023 electorate)
- Metropolitan borough: City of Liverpool
- Metropolitan county: Merseyside
- Region: North West
- Country: England
- Sovereign state: United Kingdom
- UK Parliament: Liverpool Riverside
- Councillors: Jane Corbett (Labour)

Everton West ward is an electoral district of Liverpool City Council within the Liverpool Riverside constituency.

The ward was created for the elections held on 4 May 2023 following a 2022 review by the Local Government Boundary Commission for England, which decided that the previous 30 wards each represented by three Councillors should be replaced by 64 wards represented by 85 councillors with varying representation by one, two or three councillors per ward. The Everton West ward was created as a single-member ward from the western half of the former Everton ward. The ward boundaries follow Scotland Road, the southern boundary of the Great Homer Street District Centre, Conway Street, Heyworth Street, Everton Road, Erskine Street, Islington and Hunter Street, excluding Liverpool John Moores University's City Campus. The ward includes the Merseyside Police headquarters, Everton Park and Liverpool Hope University's Creative Campus.

== Councillors ==
Election	Councillor
2023	Jane Corbett (Lab)

indicates seat up for re-election after boundary changes.

indicates seat up for re-election.

indicates change in affiliation.

indicates seat up for re-election after casual vacancy.

== Election results ==
=== Elections of the 2020s ===
4th May 2023
Party	Candidate	Votes	%	±%
Labour	Jane Corbett^{§}	347	53.14	
Green	Kevin Robinson-Hale	294	45.02	
Conservative	Miles David Anthony Waters	12	1.84	
Majority		53	8.12	
Turnout		653	22.49	
Rejected ballots		1	0.15	
Total ballots		654	22.53	
Registered electors		2,903		
Labour win (new seat)				

^{§}Jane Corbett was a re-standing councillor for the former Everton ward.
