= 2023 Liverpool City Council election =

Liverpool City Council elections 2023

- 4 May 2023

All 85 seats to Liverpool City Council 43 seats needed for a majority
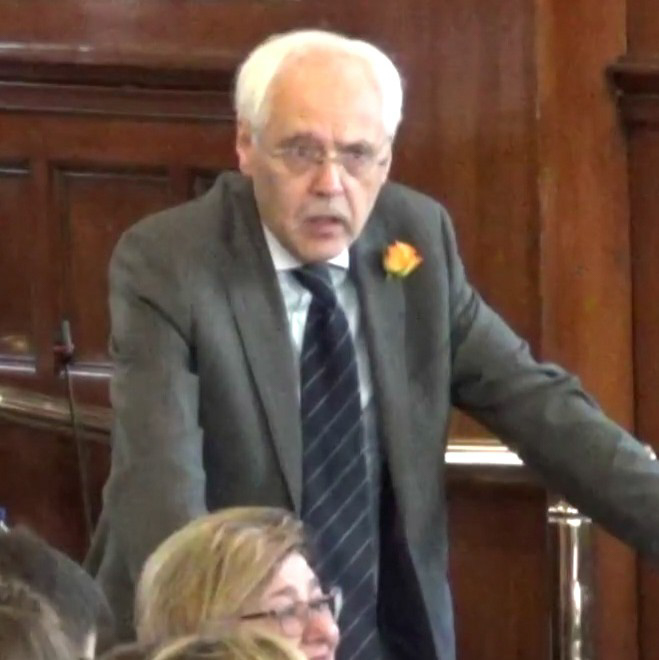

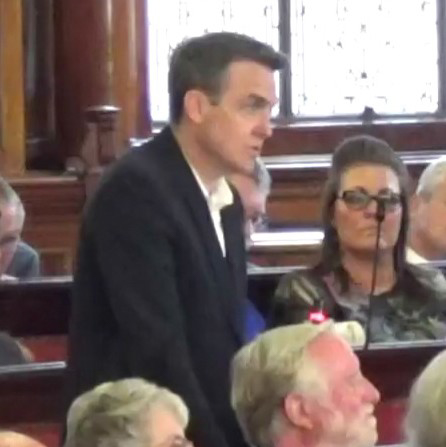

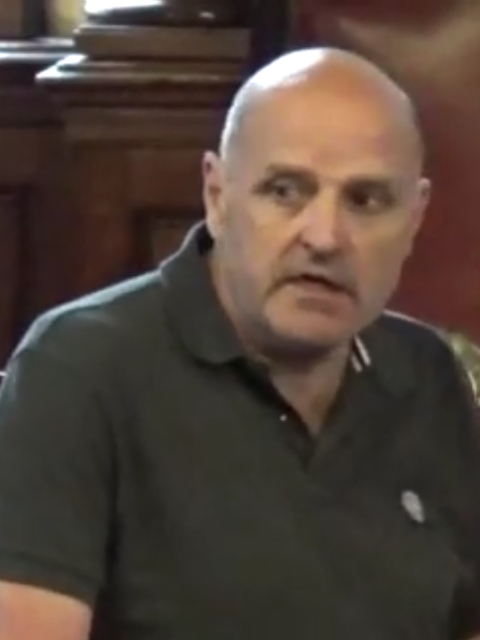
	First party	Second party	Third party
Leader	Liam Robinson	Richard Kemp	Tom Crone
Party	Labour	Liberal Democrats	Green
Leader's seat	Kensington and Fairfield	Penny Lane	St. Michael's
Seats before	58	11	4
Seats after	61	15	3
Seat change	▲3	▲4	▼1
Popular vote	65,979	26,839	12,248
Percentage	53.1%	21.6%*	9.8%*
Swing	▲3.1%	▲1% (Note: The Liberal Democrats, Green Party, Liverpool Community Independents, and Liberal Party didn't stand a full slate of candidates, so the share and change of the vote is not a reliable indicator of the parties' performances.)	▼4.2%
	Fourth party	Fifth party
Leader	Alan Gibbons	Steve Radford
Party	Community Independents	Liberal
Leader's seat	Orrell Park	Stoneycroft
Seats before	6	5
Seats after	3	3
Seat change	▼3	▼2
Popular vote	5,520	3,991
Percentage	4.6%*	3.2%*
Swing		▼4.7%
- Map showing the results of the 2023 Liverpool City Council election
Mayor before election
Joanne Anderson
Labour
Leader after election
Liam Robinson
Labour

The 2023 Liverpool City Council election took place on 4 May 2023 to elect members of Liverpool City Council. Following a Boundary Review by The Local Government Boundary Commission for England, the size of the council was reduced from 90 to 85 seats with a change from three-member seats, elected in thirds, three years out of every four, following the British Government instigated Best Value Inspection Report which led to the appointment by the government of Commissioners and the subsequent boundary review for Council Wards in Liverpool which the government initiated with the proviso that the number of councillors be reduced and the predominant number of wards be reduced to single members with all-up elections every four years. The election also marked the end of Liverpool's directly elected mayoralty. After the election the council reverted to having a leader of the council chosen from amongst the councillors instead. Labour retained control of the council and their group leader Liam Robinson became leader of the council after the election.

== Candidates ==
304 candidates were validly nominated to stand in the election. Only the Labour Party contested all 85 seats. The Liberal Democrats fielded 62 candidates; the Green Party 56 and the Conservative Party 39. There were 37 independent candidates although many of these were actually candidates standing for the Liberate Liverpool party. The smaller parties fielded far fewer candidates, with the Liberal Party standing 10 candidates; Liverpool Community Independents standing 9 and Trade Unionist and Socialist Coalition standing just 3 candidates.

== Council composition ==
Before the election the composition of the council was:

↓
58	11	6	5	4
Lab	LD	CI	L	G

[There was one vacancy following the resignation of Alison Clarke (Knotty Ash) on 22 November 2022.]

After the election the composition of the council was:

↓
61	15	3	3	3
Lab	LD	CI	L	G

== Retiring councillors (old wards) ==
Council Ward	Retiring Councillor	Party	Ref
Belle Vale	Helen Thompson	Labour	
Belle Vale	Pauline Walton	Labour	
Clubmoor	Roz Gladden	Labour	
Childwall	Carole Storey	Liberal Democrats	
Clubmoor	Sarah Morton	Liverpool Community Independents	
County	Roy Gladden	Labour	
Croxteth	Carol Sung	Labour	
Greenbank	Lawrence Brown	Green	
Kensington and Fairfield	Sue Walker	Labour	
Norris Green	Barry Kushner	Labour	
Picton	Abdul Qadir	Labour	
Picton	Calvin Smeda	Labour	
St Michaels	Anna Key	Green	
St Michaels	Stephanie Pitchers	Green	
Warbreck	Ann O'Byrne	Labour	
Wavertree	Clare McIntyre	Labour	
West Derby	Pam Thomas	Labour	
Woolton	Barbara Mace	Liberal Democrats	
Yew Tree	Tony Concepcion	Labour	

== Results summary ==
2023 Liverpool City Council election
Party	Candidates	Seats	Gains	Losses	Net gain/loss	Seats %	Votes %	Votes	+/−
Labour	85	61	3		+3	71.76	53.13	65,979	
Liberal Democrats	62	15	4	0	+4	17.65	21.61	26,839	
Green	56	3	0	1	−1	3.53	9.76	12,248	
Independent	37	0				—	5.50	6,210	
Community Independents	9	3	0	3	−3	3.53	4.64	5,520	
Liberal	10	3	0	2	−2	3.53	3.21	3,991	
Conservative	39	0	0	0	0	-	1.70	1,981	
TUSC	3	0	0	0	0	—	0.25	313	
NIP	1	0			0	—	0.1	125	
Old Swan Against the Cuts	1	0				—	0.05	60	

== Voter photo ID ==
For the first time in local elections in England, voters had to produce photo ID in order to receive a ballot paper as a result of the Elections Act 2022 which was passed into law by the Conservative government. In Liverpool, at this election, a total of 516 electors were initially refused a ballot paper, of these 278 subsequently returned to the polling station with accepted photo ID and were issued with a ballot paper. 278 electors did not return to cast their vote. There were a total of 62,681 issued ballot papers, so the 278 electors who were refused ballot papers due to not producing acceptable photo ID amounted to 0.4% of the voters.

== Results by ward ==
* member of the preceding council

§ standing as an independent but affiliated with the Liberate Liverpool party.

=== Aigburth ===
Aigburth (1 seat)
Party	Candidate	Votes	%	±%
Liberal Democrats	Dave Antrobus	862	50.32	N/A
Labour Co-op	Cate Murphy	546	31.87	N/A
Green	Jean-Paul Roberts	266	15.53	N/A
Conservative	David Jeffery	39	2.28	N/A
Majority		316	18.45	N/A
Registered electors		4,081		
Turnout		1,713	41.97	N/A
Rejected ballots		13		
Liberal Democrats win (new seat)				

Aigburth voter photo ID data
Voters initially refused a ballot paper	2
Voters who returned with accepted ID	2
Voters who did not return to vote	0

=== Allerton ===
Allerton (1 seat)
Party	Candidate	Votes	%	±%
Liberal Democrats	Andrew Makinson *	1,143	61.95	N/A
Labour	Clare McIntyre *	445	24.12	N/A
Green	Rosalyn Morton	193	10.46	N/A
Conservative	Nathan Gallimore-King	64	3.47	N/A
Majority		698	37.83	N/A
Registered electors		4,286		
Turnout		1,845	43.01	N/A
Rejected ballots		8		
Liberal Democrats win (new seat)				

Allerton voter photo ID data
Voters initially refused a ballot paper	7
Voters who returned with accepted ID	2
Voters who did not return to vote	5

Andrew Makinson (Lib Dems) was an outgoing councillor for the pre-2023 Church ward, and in the past, a councillor for Picton.

Clare McIntyre (Labour) was an outgoing councillor for Wavertree.

Labour initially selected Tris Brown, and his signature still appeared on their manifesto on their website then replaced him with student Joshua Falconer before subsequently replacing him with outgoing Wavertree councillor Clare McIntyre.

=== Anfield ===
Anfield (2 seats)
Party	Candidate	Votes	%	±%
Labour	Billy Marrat *	1,194	70.44	N/A
Labour	Lena Simic *	868	51.21	N/A
Liberal	Jimmy Richardson	330	19.47	N/A
Liberal	Shelley Williams	251	14.81	N/A
Green	Craig Dobbin	228	13.45	N/A
Liberal Democrats	Wiebke Rueterjans	115	6.78	N/A
Conservative	Andrew Roe-Crines	68	4.01	N/A
Majority		864		N/A
Registered electors		8,015		
Turnout		1,703	21.25	N/A
Rejected ballots		8	0.27	N/A
Labour win (new seat)				
Labour win (new seat)				

Anfield voter photo ID data
Voters initially refused a ballot paper	20
Voters who returned with accepted ID	7
Voters who did not return to vote	13

Billy Marrat and Lena Simic were outgoing councillors for the pre-2023 Anfield ward.

=== Arundel ===
Arundel (1 seat)
Party	Candidate	Votes	%	±%
Labour	Laura Robertson-Collins *	716	73.44	N/A
Green	Rachael Blackman Stretton	154	15.79	N/A
Liberal Democrats	Jeremy Clein	105	10.77	N/A
Majority		562	57.64	N/A
Registered electors		3,670		
Turnout		975	26.57	N/A
Rejected ballots		8		N/A
Labour win (new seat)				

Arundel voter photo ID data
Voters initially refused a ballot paper	12
Voters who returned with accepted ID	10
Voters who did not return to vote	2

Laura Robertson-Collins was an outgoing councillor for Greenbank.

=== Belle Vale ===
Belle Vale (2 seats)
Party	Candidate	Votes	%	±%
Labour	Lynnie Hinnigan *	1,645	69.18	N/A
Labour	Ruth Bennett *	1,547	65.05	N/A
Independent	Rev. Jane McKelvey §	387	16.27	N/A
Liberal Democrats	Stephen Atkinson	256	10.77	N/A
Independent	Mally Hanlon §	224	9.42	N/A
Green	Alvaro Jose Costela Sanchez	171	7.19	N/A
Liberal Democrats	Adam Fitzgibbon	141	5.93	N/A
Majority		1,258		N/A
Registered electors		4,385		
Turnout		2,392	24.26	N/A
Rejected ballots		14		N/A
Labour win (new seat)				
Labour win (new seat)				

Belle Vale voter photo ID data
Voters initially refused a ballot paper	20
Voters who returned with accepted ID	12
Voters who did not return to vote	8

Ruth Bennett was a councillor for the pre-2023 Belle Vale ward.

Lynnie Hinnigan was a councillor for the pre-2023 Cressington ward.

=== Broadgreen ===
Broadgreen (1 seat)
Party	Candidate	Votes	%	±%
Labour Co-op	Nick Crofts *	883	56.89	
Liberal Democrats	Josie Mullen	482	31.06	
Green	Andrew Dimelow	100	6.44	
Independent	Barry Farmer §	87	5.61	
Majority		401		
Registered electors		4,510		
Turnout		1,552	34.44	
Rejected ballots		7		
Labour Co-op win (new seat)				

Broadgreen voter photo ID data
Voters initially refused a ballot paper	9
Voters who returned with accepted ID	3
Voters who did not return to vote	6

Nick Crofts was an outgoing councillor for Knotty Ash.

=== Brownlow Hill ===
Brownlow Hill (2 seats)
Party	Candidate	Votes	%	±%
Labour	Heather Westhead	194	64.88	
Labour	Tom Cardwell *	193	64.55	
Green	Michael Stretton	118	39.46	
Liberal Democrats	Steven Garnett	58	19.40	
Majority		75		
Registered electors		2,846		
Turnout		305	10.72	
Rejected ballots		6		
Labour win (new seat)				
Labour win (new seat)				

Brownlow Hill voter photo ID data
Voters initially refused a ballot paper	1
Voters who returned with accepted ID	1
Voters who did not return to vote	0

=== Calderstones ===
Calderstones (1 seat)
Party	Candidate	Votes	%	±%
Liberal Democrats	Liz Makinson *	1,183	66.65	
Labour	Brian Dowling	354	19.94	
Green	David Teasdale	167	9.41	
Conservative	Danny Bowman	71	4.00	
Majority		829		
Registered electors		3,969		
Turnout		3,969	44.72	
Rejected ballots		3		
Liberal Democrats win (new seat)				

Calderstones voter photo ID data
Voters initially refused a ballot paper	3
Voters who returned with accepted ID	1
Voters who did not return to vote	2

Liz Makinson (Lib Dems) is an outgoing councillor for the pre-2023 Church ward.

=== Canning ===
Canning (2 seats)
Party	Candidate	Votes	%	±%
Labour	Nathalie Nicholas *	628	63.24	N/A
Labour	Tom Logan *	555	55.89	N/A
Green	Simon Baron	394	39.68	N/A
Liberal Democrats	Joseph Slupsky	178	17.93	N/A
Independent	Michael Flaherty +	99	9.97	N/A
Majority		234		N/A
Registered electors		5,298		
Turnout		1,013	19.12	N/A
Rejected ballots		20		N/A
Labour win (new seat)				
Labour win (new seat)				

Canning voter photo ID data
Voters initially refused a ballot paper	5
Voters who returned with accepted ID	5
Voters who did not return to vote	0

Nathalie Nicholas was an outgoing councillor for Picton.

+ standing as an independent but previously affiliated with the Liberate Liverpool party, endorsement subsequently withdrawn after numerous offensive statements came to light.

=== Childwall ===
Childwall (2 seats)
Party	Candidate	Votes	%	±%
Liberal Democrats	Mike Storey	2,193	59.95	N/A
Liberal Democrats	Pat Moloney *	2,138	58.45	N/A
Labour	Brenda McGrath	996	27.23	N/A
Labour	Matthew Smyth *	838	22.91	N/A
Green	John Coyne	352	9.62	
Independent	Sharon Cross §	206	5.63	N/A
Conservative	Wendy Hine	104	2.84	N/A
Majority		1,197		N/A
Registered electors		9,671		
Turnout		3,672	37.97	N/A
Rejected ballots		14		N/A
Liberal Democrats win (new seat)				
Liberal Democrats win (new seat)				

Childwall voter photo ID data
Voters initially refused a ballot paper	14
Voters who returned with accepted ID	8
Voters who did not return to vote	6

John Coyne (Green) was a councillor for the pre-2023 St. Michael's ward between 2004 and 2015, he was elected in 2004 for the Lib Dems but joined the Green Party in 2006.

Pat Moloney (Lib Dems) was an outgoing councillor for the pre-2023 Childwall ward.

Matthew Smyth (Labour) was a councillor between 2021 and 2023 for Clubmoor ward (as it existed between 2004 and 2023).

Mike Storey (Lib Dems) was a councillor for Wavertree between 2004 and 2011, a councillor for the pre-2004 Church ward between 1984 and 2004, coincidentally a councillor for the pre-2004 Clubmoor ward between 1980 and 1984, and a councillor for the pre-1980 Clubmoor ward between 1973 and 1980.

=== Church ===
Church (1 seat)
Party	Candidate	Votes	%	±%
Liberal Democrats	Carl Cashman	1,165	55.45	N/A
Labour	David Needham	705	33.56	N/A
Green	Stefano Mariani	202	9.61	N/A
Conservative	Lovemore Bhebhe	29	1.38	N/A
Majority		460		N/A
Registered electors		4,883		
Turnout		2,101	43.03	N/A
Rejected ballots				
Liberal Democrats win (new seat)				

Church voter photo ID data
Voters initially refused a ballot paper	8
Voters who returned with accepted ID	6
Voters who did not return to vote	2

Carl Cashman (Lib Dems) was an outgoing councillor for the Knowsley ward of Prescot North.

=== City Centre North ===
City Centre North (2 seats)
Party	Candidate	Votes	%	±%
Labour	Christine Banks *	466	55.34	N/A
Labour	Nick Small *	373	44.30	N/A
Green	Julian Todd	264	31.35	N/A
Community Independents	Maria Toolan *	247	29.33	N/A
Liberal Democrats	Karl White	115	13.66	N/A
Independent	Brian Philips §	60	7.13	N/A
Independent	Jacob McNally	26	3.09	N/A
Majority		202		N/A
Registered electors		4,690		
Turnout		849	18.10	N/A
Rejected ballots		7		N/A
Labour win (new seat)				
Labour win (new seat)				

City Centre North voter photo ID data
Voters initially refused a ballot paper	4
Voters who returned with accepted ID	2
Voters who did not return to vote	2

Christine Banks and Nick Small were outgoing councillors for Central.

Maria Toolan was an outgoing councillor for Central, elected as Labour.

=== City Centre South ===
City Centre South (3 seats)
Party	Candidate	Votes	%	±%
Labour	Angela Coleman *	576	62.88	N/A
Labour	Elizabeth Hayden *	525	57.31	N/A
Labour	Hetty Wood *	499	54.48	N/A
Green	Sally Newey	359	39.19	N/A
Independent	Sean Weaver §	184	20.09	N/A
Liberal Democrats	Jake Connolly	142	15.50	N/A
NIP	Billie Jo Gibson	125	13.65	N/A
Majority		140		N/A
Registered electors		2,413		
Turnout		919	16.25	N/A
Rejected ballots		3		N/A
Labour win (new seat)				
Labour win (new seat)				
Labour win (new seat)				

City Centre South voter photo ID data
Voters initially refused a ballot paper	2
Voters who returned with accepted ID	0
Voters who did not return to vote	2

Angela Coleman was an outgoing councillor for Wavertree.

Elizabeth Hayden was an outgoing councillor for the pre-2023 Mossley Hill ward.

Hetty Wood was an outgoing councillor for Riverside.

=== Clubmoor East ===
Clubmoor East (1 seat)
Party	Candidate	Votes	%	±%
Labour	Louise Ashton	607	71.33	N/A
Liberal	Alan Oscroft	95	11.16	N/A
Independent	Peter Grimes	94	11.05	N/A
Green	Martin Dunschen	55	6.46	N/A
Majority		512		N/A
Registered electors		4,485		
Turnout		851	18.97	N/A
Rejected ballots		4		N/A
Labour win (new seat)				

Clubmoor East voter photo ID data
Voters initially refused a ballot paper	21
Voters who returned with accepted ID	13
Voters who did not return to vote	8

=== Clubmoor West ===
Clubmoor West (1 seat)
Party	Candidate	Votes	%	±%
Labour Co-op	Si Jones	739	72.31	N/A
Independent	Kev Morland	189	18.49	N/A
Green	Joseph Rynhart	62	6.07	N/A
Conservative	Mundher Ba Shammakh	32	3.13	N/A
Majority		550		N/A
Registered electors		4,349		
Turnout		1,022	23.5	N/A
Rejected ballots		5		N/A
Labour Co-op win (new seat)				

Clubmoor West voter photo ID data
Voters initially refused a ballot paper	7
Voters who returned with accepted ID	3
Voters who did not return to vote	4

=== County ===
County (2 seats)
Party	Candidate	Votes	%	±%
Labour	John Jennings	1,080	58.10	N/A
Labour	Bernard Packenham	922	49.60	N/A
Independent	Gerard Woodhouse	619	33.30	N/A
Independent	Rosey Edwards	197	10.60	N/A
Liberal Democrats	Geoffrey Bell	181	9.74	N/A
Independent	Lisa Mansfield §	173	9.31	N/A
Conservative	Louise Waters	71	3.82	N/A
Majority		461		N/A
Registered electors		7,790		
Turnout		1,891	24.27	N/A
Rejected ballots		32		N/A
Labour win (new seat)				
Labour win (new seat)				

County voter photo ID data
Voters initially refused a ballot paper	7
Voters who returned with accepted ID	4
Voters who did not return to vote	3

Gerard Woodhouse (Independent) was a Councillor for the pre-2023 County ward, elected as Labour.

=== Croxteth ===
Croxteth (1 seat)
Party	Candidate	Votes	%	±%
Labour Co-op	Anthony Lavelle *	740	82.50	N/A
Independent	Maurice Sherman §	89	9.92	N/A
Liberal Democrats	William Barrow	68	7.58	N/A
Majority		651		N/A
Registered electors		4,344		
Turnout		897	20.65	N/A
Rejected ballots		4		N/A
Labour Co-op win (new seat)				

Croxteth voter photo ID data
Voters initially refused a ballot paper	1
Voters who returned with accepted ID	1
Voters who did not return to vote	0

Anthony Lavelle was a Councillor for the pre-2023 Croxteth ward.

=== Croxteth Country Park ===
Croxteth Country Park (1 seat)
Party	Candidate	Votes	%	±%
Labour Co-op	Lila Bennett *	836	59.12	N/A
Community Independents	Michael Williams	297	21.00	N/A
Liberal Democrats	Pam Clein	117	8.27	N/A
Green	David Kelly	90	6.36	N/A
Conservative	Katie Burgess	74	5.23	N/A
Majority		539		N/A
Registered electors		5,064		
Turnout		1,414	27.92	N/A
Rejected ballots		4		N/A
Labour Co-op win (new seat)				

Croxteth Country Park voter photo ID data
Voters initially refused a ballot paper	19
Voters who returned with accepted ID	12
Voters who did not return to vote	7

Lila Bennett was an outgoing councillor for West Derby.

=== Dingle ===
Dingle (2 seats)
Party	Candidate	Votes	%	±%
Labour	Sarah Doyle *	1,317	72.76	N/A
Labour	Steve Munby *	1,298	71.71	N/A
Green	Anna Corkill	376	20.77	N/A
Green	Kevin Hill	207	11.44	N/A
Liberal Democrats	Peter Rainford	122	6.74	N/A
Conservative	Margaret Crichton	75	4.14	N/A
Majority		922		N/A
Registered electors		7,842		
Turnout		1,830	23.34	N/A
Rejected ballots		20		N/A
Labour win (new seat)				
Labour win (new seat)				

Dingle voter photo ID data
Voters initially refused a ballot paper	16
Voters who returned with accepted ID	6
Voters who did not return to vote	10

Sarah Doyle and Steve Munby were both outgoing councillors for Riverside.

=== Edge Hill ===
Edge Hill (1 seat)
Party	Candidate	Votes	%	±%
Labour	Naz Hasan	526	65.67	N/A
Liberal Democrats	Dr. Shiv Pande	148	18.48	N/A
Green	Suzanne Hunt	89	11.11	N/A
Conservative	Graham Moore	38	4.74	N/A
Majority		378		N/A
Registered electors		3,630		
Turnout		801	22.07	N/A
Rejected ballots		5		N/A
Labour win (new seat)				

Edge Hill voter photo ID data
Voters initially refused a ballot paper	16
Voters who returned with accepted ID	9
Voters who did not return to vote	7

=== Everton East ===
Everton East (1 seat)
Party	Candidate	Votes	%	±%
Labour	Ellie Byrne *	652	74.86	N/A
Independent	Olivia Gill §	130	14.93	N/A
Green	Helen Seymour	89	10.22	N/A
Majority		522		N/A
Registered electors		4,184		
Turnout		871	20.81	N/A
Rejected ballots		5		N/A
Labour win (new seat)				

Everton East voter photo ID data
Voters initially refused a ballot paper	6
Voters who returned with accepted ID	3
Voters who did not return to vote	3

Ellie Byrne was an outgoing councillor for Everton.

=== Everton North ===
Everton North (1 seat)
Party	Candidate	Votes	%	±%
Labour	Portia Fahey	614	61.96	N/A
Independent	John Marsden §	301	30.37	N/A
Green	Kirsty Styles	76	7.67	N/A
Majority		313		N/A
Registered electors		4,213		
Turnout		991	23.52	N/A
Rejected ballots		8		N/A
Labour win (new seat)				

Everton North voter photo ID data
Voters initially refused a ballot paper	9
Voters who returned with accepted ID	2
Voters who did not return to vote	7

=== Everton West ===
Everton West (1 seat)
Party	Candidate	Votes	%	±%
Labour	Jane Corbett *	347	53.14	N/A
Green	Kevin Robinson-Hale	294	45.02	N/A
Conservative	Miles Waters	12	1.84	
Majority		53		N/A
Registered electors		2,903		
Turnout		653	22.49	N/A
Rejected ballots		1		N/A
Labour win (new seat)				

Everton West voter photo ID data
Voters initially refused a ballot paper	2
Voters who returned with accepted ID	2
Voters who did not return to vote	0

Jane Corbett was an outgoing councillor for Everton.

=== Fazakerley East ===
Fazakerley East (1 seat)
Party	Candidate	Votes	%	±%
Labour	Frazer Lake *	581	67.72	N/A
Community Independents	Alfie Hincks *	277	32.28	N/A
Majority		304		N/A
Registered electors		4,179		
Turnout		858	20.53	N/A
Rejected ballots		5		N/A
Labour win (new seat)				

Fazakerley East voter photo ID data
Voters initially refused a ballot paper	3
Voters who returned with accepted ID	0
Voters who did not return to vote	3

Alfie Hincks was an outgoing councillor for Everton, elected as Labour.

Frazer Lake was an outgoing councillor for Fazakerley.

=== Fazakerley North ===
Fazakerley North (1 seat)
Party	Candidate	Votes	%	±%
Labour Co-op	Helen Stephens *	653	65.37	N/A
Independent	Barry Maguire §	164	16.42	N/A
Liberal Democrats	Thomas McAllister	102	10.21	N/A
Green	Amber-Page Moss	80	8.01	N/A
Majority		489		N/A
Registered electors		3,963		
Turnout		999	25.21	N/A
Rejected ballots		1		N/A
Labour Co-op win (new seat)				

Fazakerley North voter photo ID data
Voters initially refused a ballot paper	3
Voters who returned with accepted ID	3
Voters who did not return to vote	0

Helen Stephens (Labour Coop) was an outgoing councillor for Fazakerley.

=== Fazakerley West ===
Fazakerley West (1 seat)
Party	Candidate	Votes	%	±%
Labour Co-op	Paul Brant *	696	77.59	N/A
Liberal Democrats	John Powell	147	16.39	N/A
Conservative	Jeremy Lowe	54	6.02	N/A
Majority		549		N/A
Registered electors		4,276		
Turnout		897	20.98	N/A
Rejected ballots		10		N/A
Labour Co-op win (new seat)				

Fazakerley West voter photo ID data
Voters initially refused a ballot paper	10
Voters who returned with accepted ID	3
Voters who did not return to vote	7

Paul Brant was an outgoing councillor for Fazakerley.

=== Festival Gardens ===
Festival Gardens (1 seat)
Party	Candidate	Votes	%	±%
Labour	Peter Norris	358	36.46	N/A
Green	Maria Coughlan	357	36.35	N/A
Liberal Democrats	Steve Brauner	241	24.54	N/A
Conservative	Brian Stewart	26	2.65	N/A
Majority		1		N/A
Registered electors		2,860		
Turnout		982	34.3	N/A
Rejected ballots		2		N/A
Labour win (new seat)				

Festival Gardens voter photo ID data
Voters initially refused a ballot paper	2
Voters who returned with accepted ID	2
Voters who did not return to vote	0

=== Garston ===
Garston (2 seats)
Party	Candidate	Votes	%	±%
Community Independents	Sam Gorst *	1,470	49.33	N/A
Community Independents	Lucy Williams	1,159	38.89	N/A
Labour	Sharon Connor *	1,022	34.30	N/A
Labour	Richard McLean	832	27.92	N/A
Liberal Democrats	Peter Millea	579	19.43	N/A
Liberal Democrats	Mike McAllister-Bell	430	14.43	N/A
Green	Helene Santamera	145	4.87	N/A
Majority		137		N/A
Registered electors		8,072		
Turnout		2,987	37.00	N/A
Rejected ballots		7		N/A

Garston voter photo ID data
Voters initially refused a ballot paper	10
Voters who returned with accepted ID	6
Voters who did not return to vote	4

Sharon Connor was an outgoing councillor for Allerton and Hunts Cross.

Sam Gorst was an outgoing councillor for Cressington, elected as Labour.

=== Gateacre ===
Gateacre (1)
Party	Candidate	Votes	%	±%
Liberal Democrats	Kris Brown	935	56.43	N/A
Labour	Maureen McDaid	512	30.90	N/A
Green	Eleanor Pontin	122	7.36	N/A
Conservative	Giselle McDonald	88	5.31	N/A
Majority		423	25.52	N/A
Registered electors		4,834		
Turnout		1657	34.28	N/A
Rejected ballots		11	0.65	N/A

Kris Brown (Lib Dems) is an outgoing councilor for Woolton.

=== Grassendale & Cressington ===
Grassendale & Cressington (1 seat)
Party	Candidate	Votes	%	±%
Liberal Democrats	Richard Clein	1,073	56.12	N/A
Labour	Eileen Walsh	568	29.71	N/A
Green	Ceri Jones	228	11.92	N/A
Conservative	Derek Nuttall	43	2.25	N/A
Majority		505		N/A
Registered electors		4,635		
Turnout		1,912	41.25	N/A
Rejected ballots		17		N/A
Liberal Democrats win (new seat)				

Grassendale & Cressington voter photo ID data
Voters initially refused a ballot paper	4
Voters who returned with accepted ID	2
Voters who did not return to vote	2

Richard Clein was an outgoing councillor for Cressington.

=== Greenbank Park ===
Greenbank Park (1 seat)
Party	Candidate	Votes	%	±%
Green	Martyn Madeley	660	45.21	N/A
Labour	Tom Clements	536	36.71	N/A
Liberal Democrats	Seb Regnier-Wilson	226	15.48	N/A
Conservative	Peter Andrew	38	2.6	N/A
Majority		124		N/A
Registered electors		4,004		
Turnout		1,460	36.46	N/A
Rejected ballots		3		N/A
Green win (new seat)				

Greenbank Park voter photo ID data
Voters initially refused a ballot paper	5
Voters who returned with accepted ID	2
Voters who did not return to vote	3

=== Kensington & Fairfield ===
Kensington & Fairfield (3 seats)
Party	Candidate	Votes	%	±%
Labour	Liz Parsons	1,574	63.98	N/A
Labour	Liam Robinson	1,539	62.56	N/A
Labour	Wendy Simon	1,444	58.70	N/A
Green	Radoslaw Chmiel	429	17.44	N/A
Community Independents	Stephen Faragher	402	16.34	N/A
Liberal Democrats	Cassandra Gabriel	294	11.95	N/A
Liberal Democrats	James Fisher	289	11.75	N/A
Independent	Joe Owens	221	8.98	N/A
Conservative	Beryl Pinnington	166	6.75	N/A
Majority		1,015		N/A
Registered electors		11,617		
Turnout		2,469	21.25	N/A
Rejected ballots		9		N/A
Labour win (new seat)				
Labour win (new seat)				
Labour win (new seat)				

Kensington & Fairfield voter photo ID data
Voters initially refused a ballot paper	14
Voters who returned with accepted ID	8
Voters who did not return to vote	6

Liz Parsons was an outgoing councillor for the pre-2023 Norris Green ward between 2021 and 2023, and prior to that was a councillor for the pre-2023 Childwall ward between 2016 and 2021.

Liam Robinson was an outgoing councillor for the pre-2023 Kensington and Fairfield ward. He is also the leader of the Liverpool Labour Party.

Wendy Simon was an outgoing councillor for the pre-2023 Kensington and Fairfield ward.

=== Kirkdale East ===
Kirkdale East (1 seat)
Party	Candidate	Votes	%	±%
Labour	Tricia O'Brien *	440	81.94	N/A
Liberal Democrats	Julia Shaw	37	6.89	N/A
TUSC	Roger Bannister	34	6.33	N/A
Independent	Ryan Kenny §	26	4.84	N/A
Majority		403		N/A
Registered electors		2,819		
Turnout		537	19.05	N/A
Rejected ballots		3		N/A
Labour win (new seat)				

Kirkdale East voter photo ID data
Voters initially refused a ballot paper	8
Voters who returned with accepted ID	4
Voters who did not return to vote	4

Tricia O'Brien was an outgoing councillor for the pre-2023 Anfield ward between 2021 and 2023, and prior to that was a councillor for Cressington between 2016 and 2021.

=== Kirkdale West ===
Kirkdale West (1 seat)
Party	Candidate	Votes	%	±%
Labour	Joe Hanson *	738	80.83	N/A
Green	Toby Irving	89	9.75	N/A
Independent	Leanne O'Shea §	86	9.42	N/A
Majority		649		N/A
Registered electors		4,105		
Turnout		913	22.24	N/A
Rejected ballots		4		N/A
Labour win (new seat)				

Kirkdale West voter photo ID data
Voters initially refused a ballot paper	12
Voters who returned with accepted ID	8
Voters who did not return to vote	4

Joe Hanson was an outgoing councillor for Kirkdale.

=== Knotty Ash & Dovecot Park ===
Knotty Ash & Dovecot Park (1 seat)
Party	Candidate	Votes	%	±%
Labour Co-op	Harry Doyle *	841	83.60	N/A
Green	Clare O'Meara	59	5.86	N/A
Liberal Democrats	Norman Darbyshire	58	5.77	N/A
Conservative	Alma McGing	48	4.77	N/A
Majority		782		N/A
Registered electors		4,176		
Turnout		1,006	24.09	N/A
Rejected ballots		8		N/A
Labour Co-op win (new seat)				

Knotty Ash & Dovecot Park voter photo ID data
Voters initially refused a ballot paper	1
Voters who returned with accepted ID	0
Voters who did not return to vote	1

Harry Doyle was an outgoing councillor for Knotty Ash.

=== Mossley Hill ===
Mossley Hill (1 seat)
Party	Candidate	Votes	%	±%
Liberal Democrats	Rob McAllister-Bell *	1,086	59.83	N/A
Labour	Graeme Cooper	443	24.41	N/A
Green	Martin Dobson	235	12.95	N/A
Conservative	Simon Murray	51	2.81	N/A
Majority		643		
Registered electors		4,084		
Turnout		1,815	44.44	N/A
Rejected ballots		10	0.24	N/A
Liberal Democrats win (new seat)				

Mossley Hill voter photo ID data
Voters initially refused a ballot paper	6
Voters who returned with accepted ID	3
Voters who did not return to vote	3

Rob McAllister-Bell (Lib Dems) was an outgoing councillor for the pre-2023 Mossley Hill ward.

=== Much Woolton & Hunts Cross ===
Much Woolton & Hunts Cross (2 seats)
Party	Candidate	Votes	%	±%
Liberal Democrats	Mirna Juarez *	1,933	59.51	N/A
Liberal Democrats	Dave Aizlewood	1,562	48.09	N/A
Labour	Elizabeth Smith	1,132	34.85	N/A
Labour	Carol Sung *	843	25.95	N/A
Green	Maggi Williams	383	11.79	N/A
Conservative	Denise Mary Nuttall	161	4.96	N/A
Majority		430		N/A
Registered electors		9,592		
Turnout		3,258	33.97	N/A
Rejected ballots		10		N/A
Liberal Democrats win (new seat)				
Liberal Democrats win (new seat)				

Much Woolton & Hunts Cross voter photo ID data
Voters initially refused a ballot paper	11
Voters who returned with accepted ID	5
Voters who did not return to vote	6

Mirna Juarez was an outgoing councillor for the pre-2023 Allerton and Hunts Cross ward.

Carol Sung (Labour) was an outgoing councillor for the pre-2023 Croxteth ward, serving between 2021 and 2023, and prior to that a councillor for Tuebrook and Stoneycroft between 2015 and 2019.

=== Norris Green ===
Norris Green (3 seats)
Party	Candidate	Votes	%	±%
Labour	Gerard Heffey	1,611	73.83	N/A
Labour	Lena McCormick	1,472	67.46	N/A
Labour	Kevin Pilnick	1,342	61.50	N/A
Independent	Natasha Ellison §	340	15.58	N/A
Green	Hilary McDonagh	296	13.57	N/A
Liberal Democrats	Helen Dietz	259	11.87	N/A
TUSC	Ann Walsh	257	11.78	N/A
Majority		1,002		N/A
Registered electors		11,144		
Turnout		2,191	19.66	N/A
Rejected ballots		9		N/A
Labour win (new seat)				
Labour win (new seat)				
Labour win (new seat)				

Norris Green voter photo ID data
Voters initially refused a ballot paper	30
Voters who returned with accepted ID	18
Voters who did not return to vote	12

=== Old Swan East ===
Old Swan East (1 seat)
Party	Candidate	Votes	%	±%
Labour	Mark Johnson	615	47.64	N/A
Liberal	Mick Coyne	462	35.79	N/A
Liberal Democrats	Alex Cottrell	65	5.03	N/A
Green	Charlotte Corke	64	4.96	N/A
Old Swan Against Cuts	Ralph Martin	60	4.65	N/A
Conservative	Chris Hall	25	1.94	N/A
Majority		153		N/A
Registered electors		4,151		
Turnout		1,291	31.1	N/A
Rejected ballots		8		N/A
Labour win (new seat)				

Old Swan East voter photo ID data
Voters initially refused a ballot paper	6
Voters who returned with accepted ID	3
Voters who did not return to vote	3

=== Old Swan West ===
Old Swan West (1 seat)
Party	Candidate	Votes	%	±%
Labour	William Shortall *	679	67.03	N/A
Community Independents	Craig Pearson	122	12.04	N/A
Liberal Democrats	Tony Chalkey	89	8.79	N/A
Green	Joyce Alexandra	79	7.80	N/A
Independent	David Pinnington §	44	4.34	N/A
Majority		557		N/A
Registered electors		4,165		
Turnout		1,013	24.32	N/A
Rejected ballots		4		N/A
Labour win (new seat)				

Old Swan West voter photo ID data
Voters initially refused a ballot paper	8
Voters who returned with accepted ID	6
Voters who did not return to vote	2

William Shortall (Labour) was an outgoing councillor for Old Swan.

=== Orrell Park ===
Orrell Park (1)
Party	Candidate	Votes	%	±%
Community Independents	Alan Gibbons *	1,428	76.98	N/A
Labour	Mumin Khan	360	19.41	N/A
Liberal Democrats	Collette McAllister	40	2.16	N/A
Conservative	Mark Butchard	27	1.46	N/A
Majority		1,068		N/A
Registered electors		4,356		
Turnout		1,855	42.58	N/A
Rejected ballots		7		N/A
Community Independents win (new seat)				

Orrell Park voter photo ID data
Voters initially refused a ballot paper	1
Voters who returned with accepted ID	0
Voters who did not return to vote	1

Alan Gibbons was an outgoing councillor for Warbreck, elected as Labour.

Alan Gibbons from the Liverpool Community Independents Party had succeeded Labour after holding Orrell Park for 17 years.

He was 1 of 3 Independents to win a council election in Liverpool for over 50 years. One of the last was Eleanor Rathbone.

=== Penny Lane ===
Penny Lane (1 seat)
Party	Candidate	Votes	%	±%
Liberal Democrats	Richard Kemp *	1,123	55.08	N/A
Labour	Tony Haimes	596	29.23	N/A
Green	Ted Grant	245	12.02	N/A
Independent	Susie Stalsberg §	56	2.75	N/A
Conservative	John Walker	19	0.93	N/A
Majority		527		N/A
Registered electors		4,723		
Turnout		2,039	43.17	N/A
Rejected ballots		6		N/A

Penny Lane voter photo ID data
Voters initially refused a ballot paper	10
Voters who returned with accepted ID	6
Voters who did not return to vote	4

Richard Kemp was an outgoing councillor for the pre-2023 Church ward, and was also leader of Liverpool Liberal Democrats at the time of the election.

=== Princes Park ===
Princes Park (1 seat)
Party	Candidate	Votes	%	±%
Labour	Lucille Harvey *	737	70.12	N/A
Green	Muryam Sheikh	218	20.74	N/A
Liberal Democrats	Fiona McBride	56	5.33	N/A
Conservative	Douglas Gaskarth	40	3.81	N/A
Majority		519		N/A
Registered electors		4,696		
Turnout		1,051	22.38	N/A
Rejected ballots		11		N/A
Labour win (new seat)				

Princes Park voter photo ID data
Voters initially refused a ballot paper	15
Voters who returned with accepted ID	8
Voters who did not return to vote	7

Lucille Harvey was an outgoing councillor for the pre-2023 Princes Park ward.

=== Sandfield Park ===
Sandfield Park (1 seat)
Party	Candidate	Votes	%	±%
Labour	Joanne Kennedy	775	55.08	N/A
Liberal	Liam Buckley	288	20.47	N/A
Liberal Democrats	James Thornhill	181	12.86	N/A
Green	Kay Inckle	106	7.53	N/A
Conservative	Pauline Shuttleworth	57	4.05	N/A
Majority		487		N/A
Registered electors		4,888		
Turnout		1,407	28.78	N/A
Rejected ballots		4		N/A
Labour win (new seat)				

Sandfield Park voter photo ID data
Voters initially refused a ballot paper	7
Voters who returned with accepted ID	6
Voters who did not return to vote	1

=== Sefton Park ===
Sefton Park (1 seat)
Party	Candidate	Votes	%	±%
Green	John David Howard	760	56.80	N/A
Labour	Jim Davies	449	33.56	N/A
Liberal Democrats	Jane Westcott	69	5.16	N/A
Conservative	Pauline Dougherty	60	4.48	N/A
Majority		311		N/A
Registered electors		4,188		
Turnout		1,338	31.95	N/A
Rejected ballots		7		N/A
Green win (new seat)				

Sefton Park voter photo ID data
Voters initially refused a ballot paper	4
Voters who returned with accepted ID	0
Voters who did not return to vote	4

=== Smithdown ===
Smithdown (2 seats)
Party	Candidate	Votes	%	±%
Labour	James Roberts *	1,211	68.85	N/A
Labour	Jon Morris	1,020	57.99	N/A
Green	Thomas Watts	414	23.54	N/A
Independent	Dave Cummings * §	399	22.68	N/A
Liberal Democrats	Angela Hulme	144	8.19	N/A
Conservative	Harry Gallimore-King	52	2.96	N/A
Majority		606		N/A
Registered electors		8,124		
Turnout		1,769	21.77	N/A
Rejected ballots		10		N/A
Labour win (new seat)				
Labour win (new seat)				

Smithdown voter photo ID data
Voters initially refused a ballot paper	28
Voters who returned with accepted ID	8
Voters who did not return to vote	20

Dave Cummings (Liberate Liverpool standing as an independent) was an outgoing councillor for Wavertree, elected as Labour.

=== Speke ===
Speke (2 seats)
Party	Candidate	Votes	%	±%
Labour	Mary Rasmussen *	1,307	69.82	N/A
Labour	Doreen Knight *	1,206	64.42	N/A
Community Independents	Paul Theobald	356	19.02	N/A
Independent	Anthony Marlow §	217	11.59	N/A
Green	Fiona Coyne	164	8.76	N/A
Liberal Democrats	Elizabeth McAllister	97	5.18	N/A
Liberal Democrats	Gerard McKeen	85	4.54	N/A
Independent	Samantha Robinson §	83	4.43	N/A
Majority		951		N/A
Registered electors		9,558		
Turnout		1,881	19.68	
Rejected ballots		9		N/A
Labour win (new seat)				
Labour win (new seat)				

Speke voter photo ID data
Voters initially refused a ballot paper	5
Voters who returned with accepted ID	2
Voters who did not return to vote	3

Doreen Knight and Mary Rasmussen were both outgoing councillors for Speke-Garston.

=== Springwood ===
Springwood (1 seat)
Party	Candidate	Votes	%	±%
Labour	Kimberley Berry *	904	57.18	N/A
Liberal Democrats	Steve Fitzsimmons	463	29.29	N/A
Green	Linda Jones	114	7.21	N/A
TUSC	Alex Smith	56	3.54	N/A
Conservative	Andrew Burgess	44	2.78	N/A
Majority		441	27.89	N/A
Registered electors		4,878		
Turnout		1,581	32.41	N/A
Rejected ballots		6	0.37	N/A
Labour win (new seat)				

Springwood voter photo ID data
Voters initially refused a ballot paper	8
Voters who returned with accepted ID	3
Voters who did not return to vote	5

Kimberley Berry was an outgoing councillor for Allerton and Hunts Cross.

Steve Fitzsimmons (Lib Dems) was a councillor, until 1998, for the pre-2004 Woolton ward as a Conservative, including serving as leader of the Liverpool Conservatives for a time. Subsequently, for a time, he was a Labour member and candidate. In 2019, he joined the Lib Dems and has stood as a Lib Dem candidate a few times.

=== St Michael's ===
St Michael's (1)
Party	Candidate	Votes	%	±%
Green	Tom Crone *	1,124	69.77	N/A
Labour Co-op	Helen Thompson *	427	26.51	N/A
Liberal Democrats	Chris Collins	40	2.48	N/A
Conservative	Robert Scott	20	1.24	N/A
Majority		697	43.26	N/A
Registered electors		4,256		
Turnout		1611	37.85	N/A
Rejected ballots		8	0.5	N/A
Green win (new seat)				

St Michael's voter photo ID data
Voters initially refused a ballot paper	5
Voters who returned with accepted ID	4
Voters who did not return to vote	1

Tom Crone (Green) was an outgoing councillor for the pre-2023 St. Michael's ward and is leader of the Liverpool Green Party.

=== Stoneycroft ===
Stoneycroft (1)
Party	Candidate	Votes	%	±%
Liberal	Steve Radford *	892	71.13	N/A
Labour	John Winder	303	24.16	N/A
Liberal Democrats	Catherine Byrne	46	3.67	N/A
Conservative	Jon Wilkinson	13	1.04	N/A
Majority		589		N/A
Registered electors		4,212		
Turnout		1,254	29.77	N/A
Rejected ballots		5		N/A
Liberal win (new seat)				

Stoneycroft voter photo ID data
Voters initially refused a ballot paper	9
Voters who returned with accepted ID	4
Voters who did not return to vote	5

Steve Radford (Liberal) was an outgoing councillor for Tuebrook and Stoneycroft, and leader of the Liberal Party nationally and locally.

=== Toxteth ===
Toxteth (1 seat)
Party	Candidate	Votes	%	±%
Labour	Rahima Farah	788	75.48	N/A
Green	Mark "Jaz" Jackson	256	24.52	N/A
Majority		532	50.96	N/A
Registered electors		4,564		
Turnout		1,044	22.87	N/A
Rejected ballots		14		N/A
Labour win (new seat)				

Toxteth voter photo ID data
Voters initially refused a ballot paper	12
Voters who returned with accepted ID	8
Voters who did not return to vote	4

=== Tuebrook Breckside Park ===
Tuebrook Breckside Park (1 seat)
Party	Candidate	Votes	%	±%
Liberal	Joe Dunne *	416	55.76	N/A
Labour	Max Barlow	266	35.66	N/A
Green	Jennifer Brown	41	5.50	N/A
Liberal Democrats	Jenny Collins	23	3.08	N/A
Majority		150	20.10	N/A
Registered electors		3,639		
Turnout		746	20.5	N/A
Rejected ballots		6		N/A
Liberal win (new seat)				

Tuebrook Breckside Park voter photo ID data
Voters initially refused a ballot paper	6
Voters who returned with accepted ID	3
Voters who did not return to vote	3

Joe Dunne (Liberal) was an outgoing councillor for Tuebrook and Stoneycroft.

=== Tuebrook Larkhill ===
Tuebrook Larkhill (1 seat)
Party	Candidate	Votes	%	±%
Liberal	Billy Lake *	724	57.78	N/A
Labour	Dave Barlow	479	38.23	N/A
Liberal Democrats	Frank Roderick	33	2.63	N/A
Conservative	Brian Jones	17	1.36	N/A
Majority		245		N/A
Registered electors		4,821		
Turnout		1,253	25.99	N/A
Rejected ballots		9		N/A
Liberal win (new seat)				

Tuebrook Larkhill voter photo ID data
Voters initially refused a ballot paper	7
Voters who returned with accepted ID	2
Voters who did not return to vote	5

Billy Lake (Liberal) was an outgoing councillor for Tuebrook and Stoneycroft.

=== Vauxhall ===
Vauxhall (2 seats)
Party	Candidate	Votes	%	±%
Labour	Lisa Gaughan *	749	65.19	N/A
Labour	Assen Assenov Christov	685	59.62	N/A
Independent	Charles Rogan §	345	30.03	N/A
Independent	Gordon Whitehall §	231	20.10	N/A
Majority		340	29.59	N/A
Registered electors		4,959		
Turnout		1,157	23.33	N/A
Rejected ballots		8		N/A
Labour win (new seat)				
Labour win (new seat)				

Vauxhall voter photo ID data
Voters initially refused a ballot paper	6
Voters who returned with accepted ID	6
Voters who did not return to vote	0

=== Walton ===
Walton (2 seats)
Party	Candidate	Votes	%	±%
Labour	Sam East	1,355	60.09	N/A
Labour	Bev Kenyon	1,067	47.32	N/A
Liberal Democrats	Karen Afford	459	20.35	N/A
Independent	John Hanlon §	444	19.69	N/A
Liberal Democrats	Graham Hulme	200	8.87	N/A
Independent	John Leather §	174	7.72	N/A
Green	Jack Hughes	146	6.47	N/A
Majority		608		N/A
Registered electors		9,045		
Turnout		2,263	25.02	N/A
Rejected ballots		8		N/A
Labour win (new seat)				
Labour win (new seat)				

Walton voter photo ID data
Voters initially refused a ballot paper	5
Voters who returned with accepted ID	2
Voters who did not return to vote	3

Sam East was an outgoing councillor for Warbreck.

=== Waterfront North ===
Waterfront North (1 seat)
Party	Candidate	Votes	%	±%
Labour Co-op	Dave Hanratty *	91	47.15	N/A
Liberal Democrats	Howard Winik	71	36.79	N/A
Green	Willhelm Hernandez de Miranda	27	13.99	N/A
Independent	William Mcgarry	3	1.55	N/A
Independent	Margaret Ryan §	1	0.52	N/A
Majority		20	10.36	N/A
Registered electors		864		
Turnout		193	22.34	N/A
Rejected ballots		1		N/A
Labour Co-op win (new seat)				

Waterfront North voter photo ID data
Voters initially refused a ballot paper	0
Voters who returned with accepted ID	0
Voters who did not return to vote	0

Dave Hanratty was an outgoing councillor for Kirkdale and was previously a councillor for Fazakerley.

=== Waterfront South ===
Waterfront South (1 seat)
Party	Candidate	Votes	%	±%
Liberal Democrats	Rebecca Turner	269	46.58	N/A
Labour Co-op	Patrick Hurley *	210	37.77	N/A
Green	Chris Coughlan	87	15.65	N/A
Majority		59	8.81	N/A
Registered electors		2,263		
Turnout		556	24.57	N/A
Rejected ballots		8		N/A
Liberal Democrats win (new seat)				

Waterfront South voter photo ID data
Voters initially refused a ballot paper	1
Voters who returned with accepted ID	1
Voters who did not return to vote	0

Patrick Hurley was an outgoing councillor for the pre-2023 Mossley Hill ward.

=== Wavertree Garden Suburb ===
Wavertree Garden Suburb (1 seat)
Party	Candidate	Votes	%	±%
Labour	Julie Fadden	564	37.68	N/A
Liberal Democrats	Rob Verity	521	34.80	N/A
Independent	Stephen McNally	153	10.22	N/A
Green	David Morgan	121	8.08	N/A
Liberal	Alan Tormey	114	7.62	N/A
Conservative	Carl Cross	24	1.60	N/A
Majority		43	2.88	N/A
Registered electors		3,976		
Turnout		1,497	37.65	N/A
Rejected ballots		6		N/A
Labour win (new seat)				

Wavertree Garden Suburb voter photo ID data
Voters initially refused a ballot paper	5
Voters who returned with accepted ID	3
Voters who did not return to vote	2

Alan Tormey (Liberal) was an outgoing councillor for the pre-2023 Childwall ward, elected as Lib Dem.

=== Wavertree Village ===
Wavertree Village (1 seat)
Party	Candidate	Votes	%	±%
Liberal Democrats	Laurence Sidorczuk	547	40.58	N/A
Labour	Josh Falconer	498	36.94	N/A
Green	Peter Cranie	175	12.98	N/A
Independent	Paul Filby	85	6.31	N/A
Reform	Adam Heatherington	30	2.23	N/A
Conservative	Laura Jeffery	13	0.96	N/A
Majority		49	3.64	N/A
Registered electors		4,218		
Turnout		1,348	32.0%	N/A
Rejected ballots		4		N/A
Liberal Democrats win (new seat)				

Wavertree Village voter photo ID data
Voters initially refused a ballot paper	5
Voters who returned with accepted ID	2
Voters who did not return to vote	3

Josh Falconer was initially selected to contest Allerton but subsequently switched to Wavertree Village.

=== West Derby Deysbrook ===
West Derby Deysbrook (1 seat)
Party	Candidate	Votes	%	±%
Labour	John Prince *	814	66.29	N/A
Independent	Stephen Riley §	165	13.44	N/A
Liberal Democrats	Daniel Clein	111	9.04	N/A
Green	Brian Bishop	93	7.57	N/A
Conservative	Danny Dougherty	45	3.66	N/A
Majority		649	52.85	N/A
Registered electors		4,475		
Turnout		1,228	27.44	N/A
Rejected ballots		6		N/A
Labour win (new seat)				

West Derby Deysbrook voter photo ID data
Voters initially refused a ballot paper	2
Voters who returned with accepted ID	1
Voters who did not return to vote	1

John Prince (Labour) was an outgoing councillor for the pre-2023 Yew Tree ward.

=== West Derby Leyfield ===
West Derby Leyfield (1 seat)
Party	Candidate	Votes	%	±%
Labour	Finley Nolan	865	48.35	N/A
Liberal Democrats	Norman Mills	792	44.27	N/A
Green	Patricia Goodwin	100	5.59	N/A
Conservative	Danny Crichton	32	1.79	N/A
Majority		73	4.08	N/A
Registered electors		4,752		
Turnout		1,789	37.65	N/A
Rejected ballots		7		N/A
Labour win (new seat)				

West Derby Leyfield voter photo ID data
Voters initially refused a ballot paper	13
Voters who returned with accepted ID	11
Voters who did not return to vote	2

=== West Derby Muirhead ===
West Derby Muirhead (1 seat)
Party	Candidate	Votes	%	±%
Labour	Colette Goulding	716	51.59	N/A
Liberal	David Maher	419	30.19	N/A
Liberal Democrats	Ian Phillips	126	9.08	N/A
Green	Harvey Brown	87	6.27	N/A
Conservative	Gillian Ferrigno	40	2.88	N/A
Majority		297	21.4	N/A
Registered electors		4,396		
Turnout		1,388	31.57	N/A
Rejected ballots		13		N/A
Labour win (new seat)				

West Derby Muirhead voter photo ID data
Voters initially refused a ballot paper	2
Voters who returned with accepted ID	1
Voters who did not return to vote	1

=== Woolton Village ===
Woolton Village (1 seat)
Party	Candidate	Votes	%	±%
Liberal Democrats	Malcolm Kelly *	862	56.41	N/A
Labour	Audrey Gaffney	406	26.57	N/A
Green	Philip Williamson	147	9.62	N/A
Conservative	David Murray	113	7.40	N/A
Majority		456	29.84	N/A
Registered electors		4,113		
Turnout		1,528	37.15	N/A
Rejected ballots		10		N/A
Liberal Democrats win (new seat)				

Woolton Village voter photo ID data
Voters initially refused a ballot paper	9
Voters who returned with accepted ID	4
Voters who did not return to vote	5

Malcolm Kelly (Lib Dems) was an outgoing councillor for Woolton.

=== Yew Tree ===
Yew Tree (2 seats)
Party	Candidate	Votes	%	±%
Labour	Dan Barrington *	1,191	65.08	N/A
Labour	Barbara Murray *	1,045	57.10	N/A
Independent	Pat Rimmer §	282	15.41	N/A
Independent	Cathy Doyle §	252	13.77	N/A
Liberal Democrats	Eddie Clein	174	9.51	N/A
Green	Will Ward	166	9.07	N/A
Conservative	David Patmore	113	6.17	N/A
Majority		899		N/A
Registered electors		7,873		
Turnout		1,836	23.32	
Rejected ballots		6		N/A
Labour win (new seat)				
Labour win (new seat)				

Yew Tree voting photo ID data
Voters initially refused a ballot paper	4
Voters who returned with accepted ID	3
Voters who did not return to vote	1

Dan Barrington was an outgoing councillor for West Derby.

Barbara Murray was an outgoing councillor for the pre-2023 Yew Tree ward.

== Comparison of ward electorates ==
The boundary review with the government mandated introduction of predominately single member wards the target ward electorate was 4,300 plus or minus 10% per councillor, based on estimated ward populations in 2027. The table below shows the variance from 4,300 per councillor for each ward based on 2023 electorates.

Party	Ward	2023 Ward Electorate	Cllrs	Electorate per Councillor	Variance from 4,300
Labour	Waterfront North	864	1	864	-79.9%
Labour	Brownlow Hill	2,846	2	1,423	-66.9%
Labour	City Centre South	5,655	3	1,885	-56.2%
Labour	Belle Vale	4,385	2	2,193	-49.0%
Liberal Democrats	Waterfront South	2,263	1	2,263	-47.4%
Labour	City Centre North	4,690	2	2,345	-45.5%
Labour	Vauxhall	4,959	2	2,480	-42.3%
Labour	Canning	5,298	2	2,649	-38.4%
Labour	Kirkdale East	2,819	1	2,819	-34.4%
Labour	Festival Gardens	2,860	1	2,860	-33.5%
Labour	Everton West	2,903	1	2,903	-32.5%
Labour	Edge Hill	3,630	1	3,630	-15.6%
Liberal	Tuebrook Breckside Park	3,639	1	3,639	-15.4%
Labour	Arundel	3,670	1	3,670	-14.7%
Labour	Norris Green	11,144	3	3,715	-13.6%
Labour	Kensington & Fairfield	11,617	3	3,872	-10.0%
Labour	County	7,790	2	3,895	-9.4%
Labour	Dingle	7,842	2	3,921	-8.8%
Labour	Yew Tree	7,873	2	3,937	-8.4%
Labour	Fazakerley North	3,963	1	3,963	-7.8%
Liberal Democrats	Calderstones	3,969	1	3,969	-7.7%
Labour	Wavertree Garden Suburb	3,976	1	3,976	-7.5%
Green	Greenbank Park	4,004	1	4,004	-6.9%
Labour	Anfield	8,015	2	4,008	-6.8%
Community Independents	Garston	8,072	2	4,036	-6.1%
Labour	Smithdown	8,124	2	4,062	-5.5%
Liberal Democrats	Aigburth	4,081	1	4,081	-5.1%
Liberal Democrats	Mossley Hill	4,084	1	4,084	-5.0%
Labour	Kirkdale West	4,105	1	4,105	-4.5%
Liberal Democrats	Woolton Village	4,113	1	4,113	-4.3%
Labour	Old Swan East	4,151	1	4,151	-3.5%
Labour	Old Swan West	4,165	1	4,165	-3.1%
Labour	Knotty Ash & Dovecot Park	4,176	1	4,176	-2.9%
Labour	Fazakerley East	4,179	1	4,179	-2.8%
Labour	Everton East	4,184	1	4,184	-2.7%
Green	Sefton Park	4,188	1	4,188	-2.6%
Liberal	Stoneycroft	4,212	1	4,212	-2.0%
Labour	Everton North	4,213	1	4,213	-2.0%
Liberal Democrats	Wavertree Village	4,218	1	4,218	-1.9%
Green	St. Michael's	4,256	1	4,256	-1.0%
Labour	Fazakerley West	4,276	1	4,276	-0.6%
Liberal Democrats	Allerton	4,286	1	4,286	-0.3%
Labour	Croxteth	4,344	1	4,344	1.0%
Labour	Clubmoor West	4,349	1	4,439	1.1%
Community Independents	Orrell Park	4,356	1	4,356	1.3%
Labour	West Derby Muirhead	4,395	1	4,395	2.2%
Labour	West Derby Deysbrook	4,475	1	4,475	4.1%
Labour	Broadgreen	4,510	1	4,510	4.9%
Labour	Walton	9,045	1	4,523	5.2%
Liberal Democrats	Grassendale and Cressington	4,635	1	4,635	7.8%
Labour	Princes Park	4,696	1	4,696	9.2%
Liberal Democrats	Penny Lane	4,723	1	4,723	9.8%
Labour	West Derby Leyfield	4,752	1	4,752	10.5%
Labour	Speke	9,558	2	4,779	11.1%
Liberal Democrats	Much Woolton & Hunts Cross	9,592	2	4,821	11.5%
Liberal	Tuebrook Larkhill	4,821	1	4,821	12.1%
Liberal Democrats	Gateacre	4,834	1	4,834	12.4%
Liberal Democrats	Childwall	9,671	2	4,836	12.5%
Labour	Springwood	4,878	1	4,878	13.4%
Liberal Democrats	Church	4,883	1	4,883	13.6%
Labour	Sandfield Park	4,888	1	4,888	13.7%
Labour	Croxteth Country Park	5,064	1	5,064	17.8%

== By-elections ==
=== Fazakerley East, 14 September 2023 ===
Caused by the resignation of Frazer Lake on 3 August 2023, following an OFSTED Report into Liverpool City Council's children's services.

Fazakerley East (1 seat)
Party	Candidate	Votes	%	±%
Labour	Debbie Cooke	350	40.94	▼26.78
Community Independents	Jean Martin	258	30.18	▼2.10
Liberal Democrats	Kayleigh Halpin	148	17.31	New
Independent	Barry Maguire	87	10.18	New
Conservative	Katie Burgess	12	1.40	New
Majority		92	10.76	▼24.68
Registered electors		4,208		
Turnout		855	20.34	▼0.18
Rejected ballots		1		
Labour hold		Swing	▼12.34	

Fazakerley East By-Election 14 September 2023 Voter photo ID
Voters initially refused a ballot paper	39
Voters who returned with accepted ID	19
Voters who did not return to vote	20

=== Broadgreen, 4 July 2024 ===
Caused by the resignation of Cllr. Nick Crofts

Broadgreen (1 seat)
Party	Candidate	Votes	%	±%
Labour	Hayley Anne Todd	1,518	55.9	▼1.0
Liberal Democrats	Josie Mullen	899	33.1	▲1.5
Green	Ellie Pontin	242	8.9	▲2.5
Liberal	Alan Tormey	58	2.1	N/A
Majority		619		▼
Registered electors		4,606		
Turnout		2,717	59	▲24.6
Rejected ballots		34		
Labour hold		Swing	▼1	

=== Clubmoor East, 4 July 2024 ===
Caused by the resignation of Cllr. Louise Ashton

Clubmoor East (1 seat)
Party	Candidate	Votes	%	±%
Labour	Richard David McLean	1,666	79.0	▲7.7
Green	Peter Andrew Cranie	202	9.6	▲3.1
Liberal	Alan Edward Oscroft	125	5.9	▼5.3
Liberal Democrats	Liz Brookes	116	5.5	new
Majority		1,464		▲
Registered electors		4,606		
Turnout		2,109		▲
Rejected ballots		59		
Labour hold		Swing	▼1	

=== Fazakerley North, 4 July 2024 ===
Caused by the resignation of Cllr. Helen Avis (née Stephens)

Fazakerley North (1 seat)
Party	Candidate	Votes	%	±%
Labour	Declan Henry	1,611	71.4	▲7.0
Community Independents	Jean Elizabeth Martin	271	12.0	N/A
Liberal Democrats	Phil Gavin	194	8.6	▼3.6
Green	Katie Joanna Jarman	181	9.6	▲1.5
Majority		1,340		▲
Registered electors		4,020		
Turnout		2,257	56.14	▲
Rejected ballots		23		
Labour hold		Swing	▲7	

=== Much Woolton & Hunts Cross, 23 January 2025 ===
Caused by the resignation of Cllr. Dave Aizlewood

Much Woolton & Hunts Cross (1 seat)
Party	Candidate	Votes	%	±%
Liberal Democrats	Josie Mullen	1,011	51.1	▲3.0
Labour	Tanya Blake	537	27.2	▼7.7
Reform	Adam Giles Heatherington	218	11.0	N/A
Green	Michael John Bates	170	8.6	▼3.2
Conservative	Adam Ernest Marsden	42	2.1	▼2.8
Majority		474		
Registered electors		9,583		
Turnout		1,978	20.64	▼13.33
Rejected ballots		1		
Liberal Democrats hold		Swing	▲3.02	

=== Sefton Park, 17 July 2025 ===
Caused by the resignation of Cllr. John David Howard

Sefton Park (1 seat)
Party	Candidate	Votes	%	±%
Green	Katie Joanna Jarman	468	49.79%	▼7%
Labour	Connor William Campbell	211	22.45%	▼11.11%
Liberal Democrats	Tristan Mark Paul	193	20.53%	▲15.37%
Reform	Harry Glen Gallimore-King	54	5.74%	N/A
Conservative	Marc Francois d'Abbadie	14	1.49%	▼2.99%
Majority		257		
Registered electors		4,162		
Turnout		940	22.75%	▼13.33
Rejected ballots		7		0
Green hold		Swing	▼7%	

=== Aigburth By-Election 12 March 2026 ===
Caused by the resignation of Cllr. Dave Antrobus

Aigburth (1 seat)
Party	Candidate	Votes	%	±%
Green	Paul Ruddick	782	45.1%	▲29.57%
Liberal Democrats	Dave Thomas	637	36.8%	▼13.52%
Labour	Jim Davies	177	10.2%	▼21.67%
Reform	Harry Glen Gallimore-King	121	7%	N/A
Independent	Craig Vincent Carden	12	0.46%	N/A
Conservative	Chris Hall	8	0.46%	▼1.82%
Majority		145		
Registered electors		4,071		
Turnout		1,737	42.67%	▲0.7%
Rejected ballots		0		-14
Green gain from Liberal Democrats		Swing		

== See also ==
- Liverpool City Council
- Liverpool Town Council elections 1835–1879
- Liverpool City Council elections 1880–present
- Mayors and Lord Mayors of Liverpool 1207 to present
- History of local government in England
- Elections in the United Kingdom
