= Mount Pleasant, Liverpool =

Street in Liverpool, England

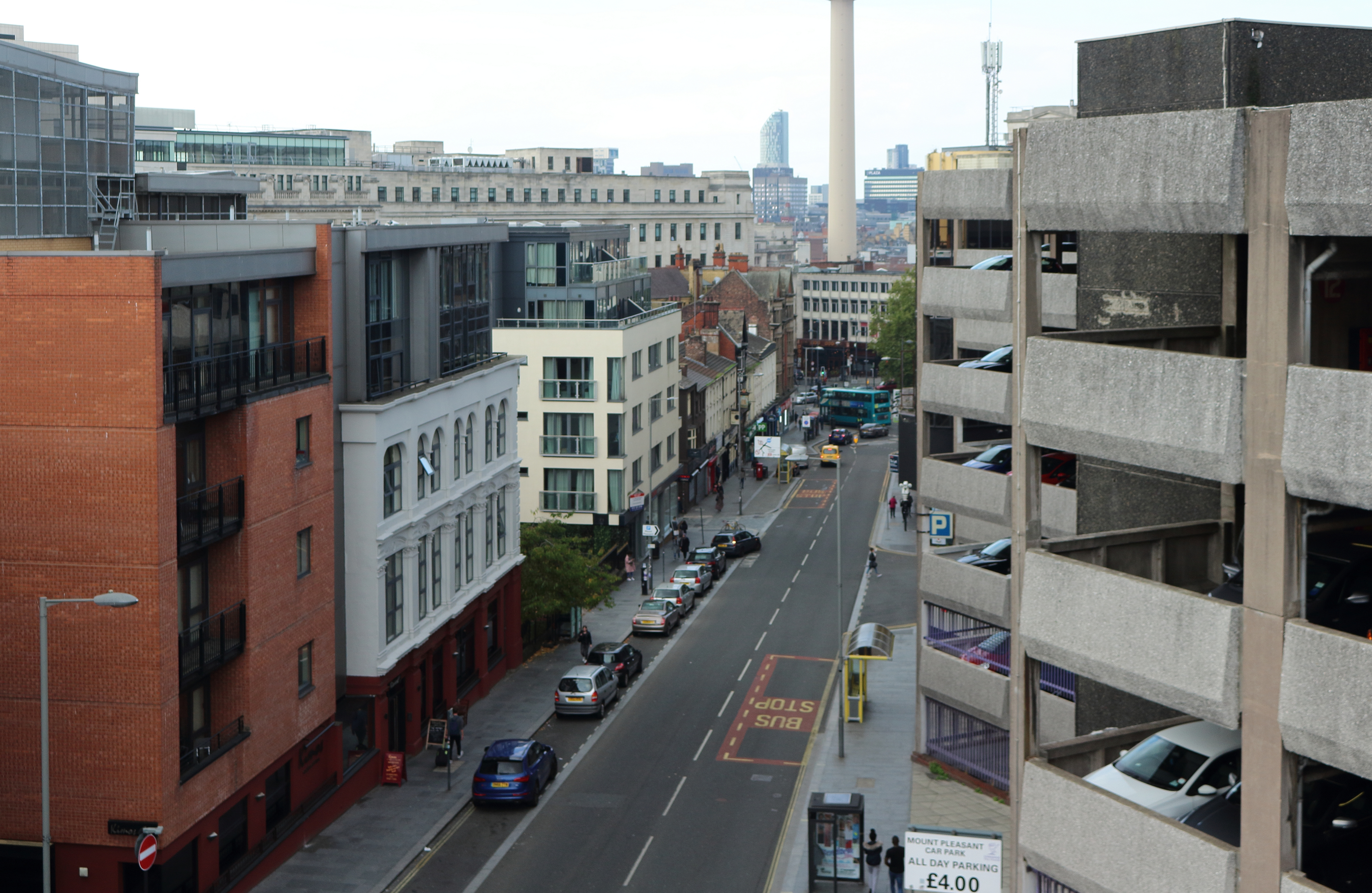
- Part of Mount Pleasant from above

- Location within Liverpool
- Location: Knowledge Quarter, Liverpool city centre
- Postal code: L3
- Coordinates: 53.40379°N 2.97197°W

Other
- Known for: Hotels, restaurants, bars, pubs, Liverpool Metropolitan Cathedral, University of Liverpool

Mount Pleasant is a street in Liverpool city centre. It is towards one end of Hope Street, and is the location of the Liverpool Metropolitan Cathedral.

It is situated on the site of one of the hills which surrounded the village of Liverpool before it expanded to be one of the United Kingdom's major cities.

William Roscoe, the historian was born in Mount Pleasant in 1753. See The House in which Roscoe was Born., painted by Samuel Austin.
