= Liverpool Community Independents =

- Leader: Alan Gibbons
- Registered: 9 February 2023; 3 years ago
- Split from: Labour Party
- Ideology: Anti-austerity
- Political position: Left-wing
- National affiliation: Your Party
- Liverpool City Council: 3 / 85

The Liverpool Community Independents are a British political party based in Liverpool, formed in 2022 by former Labour councillors.

== History ==
In April 2022, five former Labour councillors who had been suspended for voting against Labour's budget plans, along with three already-suspended members of the Labour Party, formed the Liverpool Community Independents.

In May 2022, the former Lord Mayor of Liverpool, Anna Rothery, was chosen as the group's leader, councillor Alan Gibbons was chosen as its deputy leader and Sam Gorst was chosen as its treasurer. By this time the party was formed of 8 former members of Liverpool City Council, who were among the group that had objected to what they called the Labour-led administration's "brutal" cuts to services.

In 2023, Liverpool Community Independents' executive suspended Anna Rothery as leader due to her involvement in the city council parking scandal. Councillor Alan Gibbons was voted party leader and Sam Gorst his deputy.

At the 2023 Liverpool City council election, the party won three seats, leaving them three down from the eight they had before the election. However, one candidate in Orrell Park won with 77% of the vote in a ward that had been held by Labour for the past 20 years.

Sam Gorst stood as the party's candidate in Liverpool Garston in the 2024 general election. He came third with 7.8% of the vote.

Their councillors currently sit as members of Your Party.

== Manifesto ==
The party released a manifesto based around 5 core principles:

1. Fight against corruption and for governance based on the Nolan Principles
2. Mount a national campaign against austerity
3. Avoid wasting public money
4. Build communities with good quality social housing, a green economy and clean air
5. Empower citizens through open governance

== Elected councillors ==
=== Initial representation ===
Between its formation in May 2022, and the 2023 City Council elections, 8 out of 90 council seats were occupied by Community Independent councillors.

Name	Ward
Joanne Calvert	Old Swan
Alison Clarke	Knotty Ash
Alan Gibbons	Warbreck
Sam Gorst	Cressington
Rona Heron	Old Swan
Alfie Hincks	Everton
Sarah Morton	Clubmoor
Anna Rothery	Prince's Park

Alan Gibbons was the Secretary of the Liverpool Walton Constituency Labour Party between 2016 and 2020.

=== Liverpool City Council ===
Name	Ward
Alan Gibbons	Orrell Park
Sam Gorst	Garston
Lucy Williams	Garston

== Electoral performance ==
Liverpool City Council
Election	Votes			Seats		Position	Government
Election	No.	%	±	No.	±	Position	Government
Formation				8 / 90	Steady	3rd	Labour
2023	5,520	4.6		3 / 85	▼5	▼5th	Labour

== See also ==
- List of Labour Party breakaway parties (UK)
