= Local Government Boundary Commission for England =

Body established to review boundaries of local government areas in England

The Local Government Boundary Commission for England (LGBCE) is a parliamentary body established by statute to conduct boundary, electoral and structural reviews of local government areas in England. The LGBCE is independent of government and political parties, and is directly accountable to the Speaker's Committee of the House of Commons.

== History and establishment ==
The Local Democracy, Economic Development and Construction Act 2009, which received royal assent on 12 November 2009, provided for the establishment of the Local Government Boundary Commission for England (LGBCE), and for the transfer to it of all the boundary-related functions of the Boundary Committee for England of the Electoral Commission. The transfer took place in April 2010.

== Responsibilities and objectives ==
The Local Government Boundary Commission for England is responsible for three types of review: electoral reviews; administrative boundary reviews; and structural reviews.

=== Electoral reviews ===
An electoral review considers whether the boundaries of wards or divisions within a local authority need to be altered to take account of changes in electorate. The Electoral Commission directs the commission to undertake electoral reviews and is also responsible for implementing them.

The commission also looks at the number of councillors, the number of wards or divisions and whether the wards or divisions should be represented by a single councillor, or jointly by two or three councillors.

=== Administrative boundary reviews ===
At the request of the Ministry of Housing, Communities and Local Government or of a local authority, or at the Local Government Boundary Commission for England's own instigation, the commission can undertake administrative boundary reviews, which review the external boundaries of a local authority.

=== Structural reviews ===
A structural review is used to establish whether one or more single, all-purpose councils, known as unitary authorities, should be established in an area instead of the district and county councils of the existing two-tier system.
