= 2024 Knowsley Metropolitan Borough Council election =

2024 local government election in Knowsley, England

- 2 May 2024

15 out of 45 seats to Knowsley Metropolitan Borough Council 23 seats needed for a majority

	Majority party	Minority party
Leader	Graham Morgan	Kai Taylor
Party	Labour	Green
Leader's seat	Swanside	Prescot South
Last election	31 seats, 59.0%	7 seats, 23.2%
Seats before	31	7
Seats won	12	1
Seats after	31	7
Seat change	Steady	Steady
Popular vote	16,273	5,388
Percentage	63.1%	20.9%
Swing	▲4.1%	▼2.3%
	Third party	Fourth party
Leader	None	Ian Smith
Party	Independent	Liberal Democrats
Leader's seat		Prescot North
Last election	4 seats, 7.9%	3 seats, 7.5%
Seats before	4	3
Seats won	1	1
Seats after	4	3
Seat change	Steady	Steady
Popular vote	2,496	971
Percentage	9.7%	3.8%
Swing	▲1.8%	▼3.7%
- Winner of each seat at the 2024 Knowsley Metropolitan Borough Council election
Leader before election
Graham Morgan
Labour
Leader after election
Graham Morgan
Labour

The 2024 Knowsley Metropolitan Borough Council election was held on 2 May 2024, alongside the other local elections in the United Kingdom on the same day. No seats changed party at the election, and so Labour retained its majority on the council.

== Background ==
Result of the council election when these seats were last contested in 2021

Result of the most recent council election in 2023

The Local Government Act 1972 created a two-tier system of metropolitan counties and districts covering Greater Manchester, Merseyside, South Yorkshire, Tyne and Wear, the West Midlands, and West Yorkshire starting in 1974. Knowsley was a district of the Merseyside metropolitan county. The Local Government Act 1985 abolished the metropolitan counties, with metropolitan districts taking on most of their powers as metropolitan boroughs. The Liverpool City Region Combined Authority was created in 2014 and began electing the mayor of the Liverpool City Region from 2017. The body was given strategic powers covering a region that encompassed the former Merseyside metropolitan county with the addition of Halton Borough Council.

Since its formation, Knowsley has continuously been under Labour control. The Liberal Democrats had become the main opposition party by the late 1990s, and continued to win seats on the council until the 2010 election, when Labour won every seat. Labour continued to win every seat in subsequent elections until the 2016 election, when three Liberal Democrats were elected. The first Green Party councillor was elected to the borough in the 2018 election, with the Green Party winning a further two seats in each of the 2019 election and 2021 election to become the council's main opposition. After the 2023 election, Labour held 31 seats, the Greens held seven, independent councillors held four and the Liberal Democrats held three.

The positions up for election in 2024 were last elected in 2021. That election was originally scheduled to take place in 2020, but was delayed by a year due to the COVID-19 pandemic. In that election, Labour won twelve seats on 55.3% of the vote, the Green Party and independents won two seats each on 23.1% and 9.8% respectively and the Liberal Democrats won one seat on 5.9% of the vote.

== Electoral process ==
Knowsley Metropolitan Borough Council elected its councillors in thirds, with one councillor in each of the fifteen wards elected for a four-year term in three years out of every four. The 2024 election therefore elected fifteen of the council’s forty-five councillors. The election used first-past-the-post voting, with each elector able to vote for one candidate in their ward and the candidate receiving the most votes being elected.

All registered electors (British, Irish, Commonwealth and European Union citizens) living in Knowsley aged 18 or over were entitled to vote in the election. People who lived at two addresses in different council areas, such as university students with separate term-time and holiday addresses, were entitled to register and vote in elections in both local authorities. Voting in person at polling stations took place from 07:00 to 22:00 on election day, and electors could apply for postal or proxy votes in advance.

== Previous council composition ==
After 2023 election		Before 2024 election		After 2024 election	
Party	Seats	Party	Seats	Party	Seats
Labour	31	Labour	31	Labour	31
Green	7	Green	7	Green	7
Independent	4	Independent	4	Independent	4
Liberal Democrats	3	Liberal Democrats	3	Liberal Democrats	3

== Result ==
2024 Knowsley Metropolitan Borough Council election
Party	This election			Full council			This election		
Party	Seats	Net	Seats %	Other	Total	Total %	Votes	Votes %	+/−
Labour	12	Steady	80.0	19	31	68.9	16,273	63.1	+4.1
Green	1	Steady	6.7	6	7	15.6	5,388	20.9	-2.3
Independent	1	Steady	6.7	3	4	8.9	2,496	9.7	+1.8
Liberal Democrats	1	Steady	6.7	1	3	6.7	971	3.8	-3.7
Conservative	0	Steady	0.0	0	0	0.0	325	1.3	-0.3
TUSC	0	Steady	0.0	0	0	0.0	224	0.9	+0.4
Reform	0	Steady	0.0	0	0	0.0	116	0.4	N/A

== Ward results ==
The results for each ward were: and in a combined results document.

=== Cherryfield ===
Cherryfield
Party	Candidate	Votes	%	±%
Labour	Sean Donnelly	1,254	84.1	+7.4
Green	Patrick Francis Gilmore	237	15.9	−7.4
Majority		1017	68.2	
Turnout		1491	18.8	
Labour hold		Swing	▲7.4	

=== Halewood North ===
Halewood North
Party	Candidate	Votes	%	±%
Labour	Alan Flute	1,300	71.8	+21.0
Independent	Lili Berry	511	28.2	+7.2
Majority		789	43.6	
Turnout		1811	22.4	
Labour hold		Swing	▲6.9	

=== Halewood South ===
Halewood South
Party	Candidate	Votes	%	±%
Labour	Edna Finneran	978	50.6	▲4.3
Independent	Suzanne Harvey	955	49.4	N/A
Majority		23	1.2	
Turnout		1933	23.2	
Labour hold		Swing	N/A	

=== Northwood ===
Northwood
Party	Candidate	Votes	%	±%
Labour	Matthew Rawlinson	1,004	73.1	−4.9
TUSC	Neill Dunne	224	16.3	+1.8
Green	Russell Greenway	146	10.6	N/A
Majority		780	56.8	
Turnout		1374	15.5	
Labour hold		Swing	▼3.4	

=== Page Moss ===
Page Moss
Party	Candidate	Votes	%	±%
Labour Co-op	Ken McGlashan	1,010	67.0	▲8.9
Green	John Carine	419	27.8	−7.6
Conservative	Ruth Shuk Fun Lee	78	5.2	−1.3
Majority		591	39.2	
Turnout		1507	17.0	
Labour hold		Swing	N/A	

=== Prescot North ===
Prescot North
Party	Candidate	Votes	%	±%
Liberal Democrats	Ian Smith	971	49.7	−11.1
Labour	Tommy Grierson	891	45.6	+13.6
Conservative	Peter Stanley Leadbeater	91	4.7	−2.5
Majority		80	4.1	
Turnout		1953	21.7	
Liberal Democrats hold		Swing	▼12.3	

=== Prescot South ===
Prescot South
Party	Candidate	Votes	%	±%
Green	Graham Wickens	1,029	60.0	−1.1
Labour	Diane Sedman	686	40.0	+1.1
Majority		343	20.0	
Turnout		1715	23.3	
Green hold		Swing	▼1.1	

=== Roby ===
Roby
Party	Candidate	Votes	%	±%
Labour	Megan Dever	1,383	59.2	+11.8
Green	Carmen Escalante-Callejo	953	40.8	−0.2
Majority		430	18.4	
Turnout		2336	30.3	
Labour hold		Swing	▲6.0	

=== Shevington ===
Shevington
Party	Candidate	Votes	%	±%
Labour	Aimee Wright	1,150	80.4	+3.7
Green	Cathy Connolly	281	19.6	+12.7
Majority		869	60.7	
Turnout		1431	17.6	
Labour hold		Swing	▼4.5	

=== St Gabriels ===
St Gabriels
Party	Candidate	Votes	%	±%
Labour	Chantelle Lunt	923	52.0	N/A
Green	Crispin Evans	852	48.0	N/A
Majority		71	4.0	
Turnout		1775	24.8	
Labour hold		Swing	N/A	

=== St Michaels ===
St Michaels
Party	Candidate	Votes	%	±%
Labour	Joan Lilly	1,154	83.4	+7.6
Green	James Brian Taylor	230	16.6	+1.5
Majority		924	66.8	
Turnout		1384	19.9	
Labour hold		Swing	▲3.0	

=== Stockbridge ===
Stockbridge
Party	Candidate	Votes	%	±%
Labour	Lynn O’Keeffe	1,086	83.1	+5.2
Green	Paul Ryan	221	16.9	−5.2
Majority		865	66.2	
Turnout		1307	15.3	
Labour hold		Swing	▲5.2	

=== Swanside ===
Swanside
Party	Candidate	Votes	%	±%
Labour	Graham Morgan	1,595	82.3	+22.2
Green	Jade Escalante-Callejo	259	13.4	−26.5
Conservative	William George Finnan	83	4.3	N/A
Majority		1336	69.0	
Turnout		1937	25.8	
Labour hold		Swing	▲24.4	

=== Whiston and Cronton ===
Whiston and Cronton
Party	Candidate	Votes	%	±%
Labour	Terry Byron	1,026	51.9	+7.1
Green	Michael Antony Rutland	761	38.5	−5.4
Reform	Adam Heatherington	116	5.9	N/A
Conservative	Olusoji Arosanyin	73	3.7	−7.6
Majority		265	13.4	
Turnout		1976	26.0	
Labour hold		Swing	▲6.2	

=== Whitefield ===
Whitefield
Party	Candidate	Votes	%	±%
Independent	Steve Smith	1,030	55.3	+7.7
Labour Co-op	Louise Harbour	833	44.7	N/A
Majority		197	10.6	
Turnout		1863	23.1	
Independent hold		Swing	N/A	
