= 2022 Knowsley Metropolitan Borough Council election =

2022 local election in Knowsley

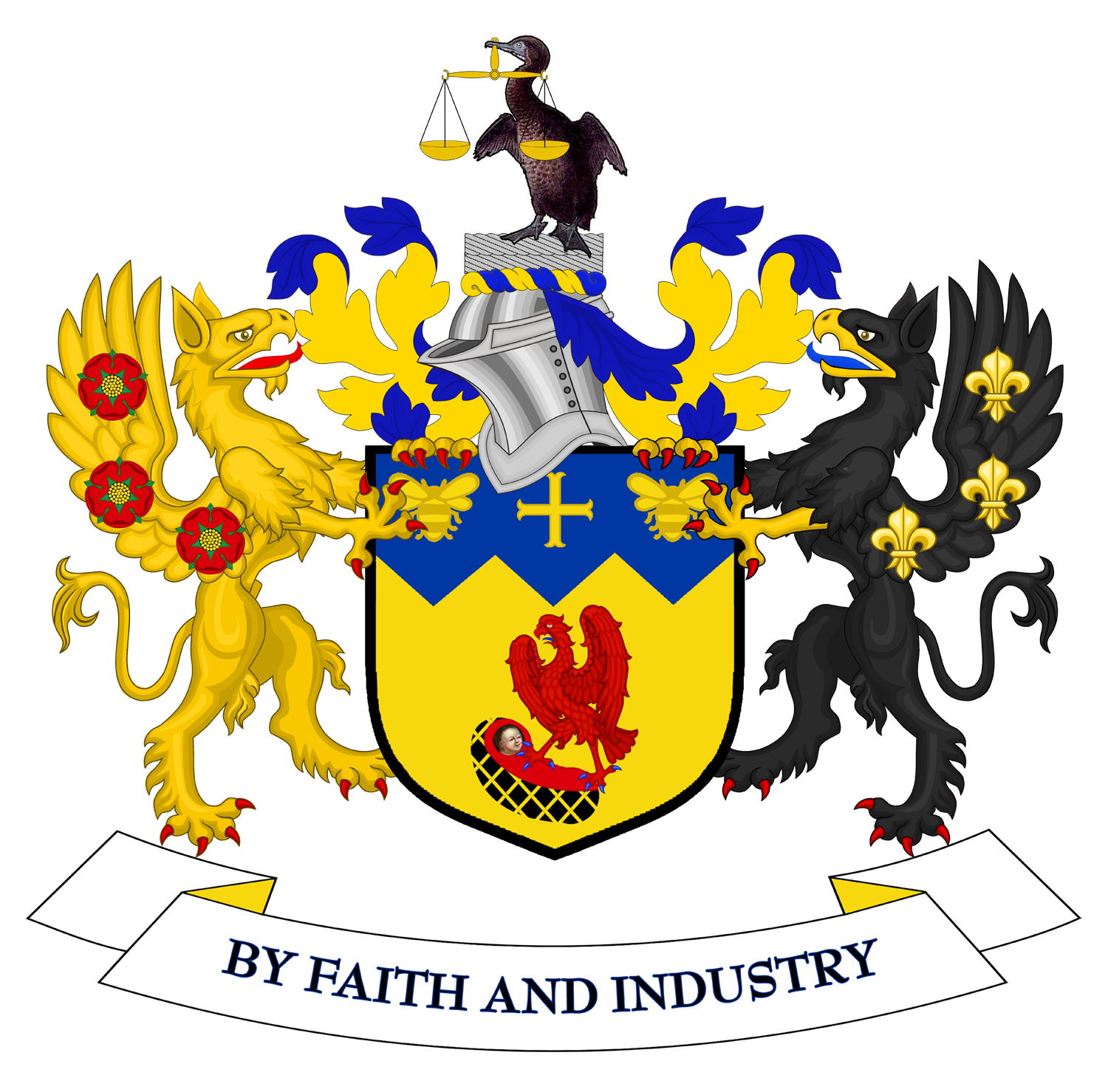
- 5 May 2022

15 out of 45 seats (one third) up for election to Knowsley Metropolitan Borough Council 23 seats needed for a majority

	First party	Second party
Leader	Graham Morgan	Kai Taylor
Party	Labour	Green
Last election	34 seats, 55.3%	5 seats, 23.1%
Seats before	32	5
Seats won	10	2
Seats after	32	6
Seat change	▼2	▲1
Popular vote	17,424	6,160
Percentage	59.2%	20.9%
Swing	▲3.9%	▼2.2%
	Third party	Fourth party
Leader	N/A	Unknown
Party	Independent	Liberal Democrats
Last election	3 seats, 9.8%	3 seats, 5.9%
Seats before	4	3
Seats won	2	1
Seats after	4	3
Seat change	▲1	Steady
Popular vote	3,630	1,276
Percentage	12.3%	4.3%
Swing	▲2.5%	▼1.6%
- Winner of each seat at the 2022 Knowsley Metropolitan Borough Council election
Council control before election
Labour
Council control after election
Labour

The 2022 Knowsley Metropolitan Borough Council election took place on 5 May 2022. One third of councillors — 15 out of 45 — on Knowsley Metropolitan Borough Council were elected. The election took place alongside other local elections across the United Kingdom.

In the previous council election in 2021, Labour maintained its longstanding control of the council, holding 34 seats after the election. The Green Party formed the main opposition with five seats, while independent councillors and the Liberal Democrats held three seats each.

== Background ==
=== History ===
Result of the council election when these seats were last contested in 2018

Result of the most recent council election in 2021

The Local Government Act 1972 created a two-tier system of metropolitan counties and districts covering Greater Manchester, Merseyside, South Yorkshire, Tyne and Wear, the West Midlands, and West Yorkshire starting in 1974. Knowsley was a district of the Merseyside metropolitan county. The Local Government Act 1985 abolished the metropolitan counties, with metropolitan districts taking on most of their powers as metropolitan boroughs. The Liverpool City Region Combined Authority was created in 2014 and began electing the mayor of the Liverpool City Region from 2017. The body was given strategic powers covering a region that encompassed the former Merseyside metropolitan county with the addition of Halton Borough Council.

Since its formation, Knowsley has continuously been under Labour control. The Liberal Democrats had become the main opposition party by the late 1990s, and continued to win seats on the council until the 2010 election, when Labour won every seat. Labour continued to win every seat in subsequent elections until the 2016 election, when three Liberal Democrats were elected. The first Green Party councillor was elected to the borough in the 2018 election, with the Green Party winning a further two seats in each of the 2019 election and 2021 election to become the council's main opposition. After the 2021 election, Labour held 34 seats, the Greens held five and independent councillors and the Liberal Democrats held three each.

The positions up for election in 2021 were last elected in 2018. In that election, Labour won twelve seats on 66.2% of the vote while the Green Party, independents and Liberal Democrats won one seat each on 12.7%, 7.5% and 6.8% of the vote respectively. The Conservatives received 5.4% of the vote but didn't win any seats.

== Electoral process ==
Knowsley Metropolitan Borough Council elects its councillors in thirds, with one councillor in each of the fifteen wards elected for a four-year term in three years out of every four. The 2022 election therefore elected fifteen of the council's forty-five councillors. The election used first-past-the-post voting, with each elector able to vote for one candidate in their ward and the candidate receiving the most votes being elected.

All registered electors (British, Irish, Commonwealth and European Union citizens) living in Knowsley aged 18 or over will be entitled to vote in the election. People who live at two addresses in different councils, such as university students with different term-time and holiday addresses, are entitled to be registered for and vote in elections in both local authorities. Voting in-person at polling stations will take place from 07:00 to 22:00 on election day, and voters will be able to apply for postal votes or proxy votes in advance of the election.

== Previous council composition ==
After 2021 election		Before 2022 election	
Party	Seats	Party	Seats
Labour	34	Labour	32
Green	5	Green	5
Independent	3	Independent	4
Liberal Democrats	3	Liberal Democrats	3

== Results summary ==
2022 Knowsley Metropolitan Borough Council election
Party	This election			Full council			This election		
Party	Seats	Net	Seats %	Other	Total	Total %	Votes	Votes %	+/−
Labour	10	▼2	66.7	22	32	71.1	17,424	59.2	+3.9
Green	2	▲1	13.3	4	6	13.3	6,160	20.9	-2.2
Independent	2	▲1	13.3	2	4	8.9	3,630	12.3	+2.5
Liberal Democrats	1	Steady	6.7	2	3	6.7	1,276	4.3	-1.6
TUSC	0	Steady	0.0	0	0	0.0	553	1.9	+0.7
Conservative	0	Steady	0.0	0	0	0.0	380	1.3	-2.8
For Britain	0	Steady	0.0	0	0	0.0	18	0.1	-0.1

== Ward results ==
=== Cherryfield ===
Cherryfield
Party	Candidate	Votes	%	±%
Labour	David Lonergan	1,372	84.9	▲2.9
TUSC	Les Connor	244	15.1	N/A
Majority		1,128	69.8	
Turnout		1,616	20.3	
Labour hold		Swing	N/A	

=== Halewood North ===
Halewood North
Party	Candidate	Votes	%	±%
Labour	Terry Powell	1,257	63.5	▼3.0
Independent	Suzanne Harvey	724	36.5	N/A
Majority		533	26.9	
Turnout		1,981	24.2	
Labour hold		Swing	N/A	

=== Halewood South ===
Halewood South
Party	Candidate	Votes	%	±%
Independent	Joanne Harvey	1,115	54.7	+13.5
Labour	Clare Rose	922	45.3	N/A
Majority		193	9.5	
Turnout		2,037	25.3	
Independent hold		Swing	N/A	

=== Northwood ===
Northwood
Party	Candidate	Votes	%	±%
Labour	Harry Bell	1,206	71.1	▼15.4
TUSC	Neill Dunne	309	18.2	N/A
Green	Matthew Kirwan	182	10.7	N/A
Majority		897	52.9	
Turnout		1,697	19.1	
Labour hold		Swing	N/A	

=== Page Moss ===
Page Moss
Party	Candidate	Votes	%	±%
Labour	Robert Austin	1,145	66.4	N/A
Green	John Carine	579	33.6	N/A
Majority		566	32.8	
Turnout		1,724	20.1	
Labour hold		Swing	N/A	

=== Prescot North ===
Prescot North
Party	Candidate	Votes	%	±%
Liberal Democrats	Frances Wynn	1,125	50.6	▼9.7
Labour	Thomas Grierson	965	43.4	N/A
Conservative	Aaron Waters	133	6.0	N/A
Majority		160	7.2	
Turnout		2,223	25.8	
Liberal Democrats hold		Swing	N/A	

=== Prescot South ===
Prescot South
Party	Candidate	Votes	%	±%
Green	Kai Taylor	1,315	58.9	▼6.6
Labour	Dena Fairclough	841	37.7	N/A
Conservative	Carl Cross	75	3.4	N/A
Majority		474	21.2	
Turnout		2,231	29.7	
Green hold		Swing	N/A	

=== Roby ===
Roby
Party	Candidate	Votes	%	±%
Labour	Kevin Bannon	1,247	50.2	▼5.9
Green	Paul Woodruff	1,236	49.8	N/A
Majority		11	0.4	
Turnout		2,483	32.5	
Labour hold		Swing	N/A	

=== Shevington ===
Shevington
Party	Candidate	Votes	%	±%
Labour	Tommy Rowe	1,206	64.5	▼25.5
Independent	Jen Bamber	598	32.0	N/A
Conservative	David Davis	49	2.6	N/A
For Britain	Christine Dillon	18	1.0	N/A
Majority		608	32.5	
Turnout		1,871	23.0	
Labour hold		Swing	N/A	

=== St Gabriels ===
St Gabriels
Party	Candidate	Votes	%	±%
Green	Cath Golding	1,033	52.5	N/A
Labour	Tracy Agger	935	47.5	N/A
Majority		98	5.0	
Turnout		1,968	26.9	
Green gain from Labour		Swing	N/A	

=== St Michaels ===
St Michaels
Party	Candidate	Votes	%	±%
Labour	Tony Ely	1,320	78.2	N/A
Green	Thomas Large	218	12.9	N/A
Liberal Democrats	James Madine	151	8.9	N/A
Majority		1,102	65.2	
Turnout		1,689	23.7	
Labour hold		Swing	N/A	

=== Stockbridge ===
Stockbridge
Party	Candidate	Votes	%	±%
Labour	Dennis Baum	1,150	79.6	▲2.9
Green	James Taylor	295	20.4	N/A
Majority		855	59.2	
Turnout		1,445	17.4	
Labour hold		Swing	N/A	

=== Swanside ===
Swanside
Party	Candidate	Votes	%	±%
Labour	Colin Dever	1,667	80.0	▼1.3
Green	Graham Golding	293	14.1	N/A
Conservative	Will Finnan	123	5.9	N/A
Majority		1,374	66.0	
Turnout		2,083	27.4	
Labour hold		Swing	N/A	

=== Whiston and Cronton ===
Whiston and Cronton
Party	Candidate	Votes	%	±%
Labour	Denise Allen	1,164	53.6	N/A
Green	Sandra Gaffney	1,009	46.4	N/A
Majority		155	7.1	
Turnout		2,173	29.7	
Labour hold		Swing	N/A	

=== Whitefield ===
Whitefield
Party	Candidate	Votes	%	±%
Independent	Steve Guy	1,193	53.7	N/A
Labour	Louise Harbour	1,027	46.3	▼44.3
Majority		166	7.5	
Turnout		2,220	28.0	
Independent gain from Labour		Swing	N/A	
