= List of electoral wards in Merseyside =

This is a list of electoral divisions and wards in the ceremonial county of Merseyside in North West England. All changes since the re-organisation of local government following the passing of the Local Government Act 1972 are shown. The number of councillors elected for each electoral division or ward is shown in brackets.

== District councils ==
=== Knowsley ===
Wards from 1 April 1974 (first election 10 May 1973) to 6 May 1982:

1. No. 1 (Huyton: Huyton Farm-Princess-Woolfall) (6)
2. No. 2 (Huyton: Longview and Rupert Farm) (3)
3. No. 3 (Huyton: St. Agnes-St. Bartholomew-Swanside) (6)
4. No. 4 (Huyton: St. Gabriels and St. Michaels) (6)
5. No. 5 (Kirkby:Central) (3)
6. No. 6 (Kirkby: Cherryfield) (3)
7. No. 7 (Kirkby: Minstead) (3)
8. No. 8 (Kirkby: Northwood and Tower Hill) (3)
9. No. 9 (Kirkby: Park) (3)
10. No. 10 (Whitefield) (3)
11. No. 11 (Prescot) (6)
12. No. 12 (Whiston) (6)
13. No. 13 (Halewood) (6)
14. No. 14 (Knowsley) (6)

Wards from 6 May 1982 to 10 June 2004:

1. Cantril Farm (3)
2. Cherryfield (3)
3. Halewood East (3)
4. Halewood South (3)
5. Halewood West (3)
6. Kirkby Central (3)
7. Knowsley Park (3)
8. Longview (3)
9. Northwood (3)
10. Page Moss (3)
11. Park (3)
12. Prescot East (3)
13. Prescot West (3)
14. Princess (3)
15. Roby (3)
16. St. Gabriels (3)
17. St. Michaels (3)
18. Swanside (3)
19. Tower Hill (3)
20. Whiston North (3)
21. Whiston South (3)
22. Whitefield (3)

Wards from 10 June 2004 to 5 May 2016:

1. Cherryfield (3)
2. Halewood North (3)
3. Halewood South (3)
4. Halewood West (3)
5. Kirkby Central (3)
6. Longview (3)
7. Northwood (3)
8. Page Moss (3)
9. Park (3)
10. Prescot East (3)
11. Prescot West (3)
12. Roby (3)
13. St Bartholomews (3)
14. St Gabriels (3)
15. St Michaels (3)
16. Shevington (3)
17. Stockbridge (3)
18. Swanside (3)
19. Whiston North (3)
20. Whiston South (3)
21. Whitefield (3)

Wards from 5 May 2016 to present:

1. Cherryfield (3)
2. Halewood North (3)
3. Halewood South (3)
4. Northwood (3)
5. Page Moss (3)
6. Prescot North (3)
7. Prescot South (3)
8. Roby (3)
9. Shevington (3)
10. St Gabriels (3)
11. St Michaels (3)
12. Stockbridge (3)
13. Swanside (3)
14. Whiston and Cronton (3)
15. Whitefield (3)

=== Liverpool ===
Wards from 1 November 1835 (First election 26 December 1835) to 31 October 1895:

1. Everton and Kirkdale (3)
2. Scotland (3)
3. Vauxhall (3)
4. St. Paul's (3)
5. Exchange (3)
6. Castle Street (3)
7. St. Peter's (3)
8. Pitt Street (3)
9. Great George (3)
10. Rodney Street (3)
11. Aberctomby (3)
12. Lime Street (3)
13. St. Anne Street(3)
14. West Derby (3)
15. South Toxteth (3)
16. North Toxteth (3)

Wards from 1 November 1895 (first election 1 November 1895) to 30 April 1953:

1. Sandhills (3)
2. Kirkdale (3)
3. South Walton (3)
4. Fairfield (3)
5. Wavertree (3)
6. Breckfield (3)
7. St. Domingo (3)
8. Netherfield (3)
9. Everton (3)
10. Low Hill (3)
11. Kensington (3)
12. Edge Hill (3)
13. North Scotland (3)
14. South Scotland (3)
15. Vauxhall (3)
16. Exchange (3)
17. St. Anne's (3)
18. Castle Street (3)
19. St. Peter's (3)
20. Great George (3)
21. Abercromby (3)
22. Granby (3)
23. Prince's Park (3)
24. Sefton Park (3)
25. Brunswick (3)
26. Dingle (3)
27. North Walton (3)
28. West Derby (3)

1913 Two new wards created : Much Woolton and Allerton, Childwall and Little Woolton

1920 Allerton, Childwall and Little Woolton ward split into Allerton (1 seat); Childwall (2 seats) and Little Woolton (1 seat)

1924 Second seat added for Allerton ward.

1925 Third seat added for Allerton ward

1928 Third seat added for Childwall ward. Croxteth ward added.

Wards from 1 May 1953 (first election 1 May 1953) to 30 April 1973:

1. Abercromby (3)
2. Aigburth (3)
3. Allerton (3)
4. Anfield (3)
5. Arundel (3)
6. Breckfield (3)
7. Broadgreen (3)
8. Central (3)
9. Childwall (3)
10. Church (3)
11. Clubmoor (3)
12. County (3)
13. Croxteth (3)
14. Dingle (3)
15. Dovecot (3)
16. Everton (3)
17. Fairfield (3)
18. Fazakerley (3)
19. Gillmoss (3)
20. Granby (3)
21. Kensington (3)
22. Low Hill (3)
23. Melrose (3)
24. Netherfield (3)
25. Old Swan (3)
26. Picton (3)
27. Pirrie (3)
28. Princes Park (3)
29. Sandhills (3)
30. St. Domingo (3)
31. St. James' (3)
32. St. Mary's (3)
33. St. Michael's (3)
34. Smithdown (3)
35. Speke (3)
36. Tuebrook (3)
37. Vauxhall (3)
38. Warbreck (3)
39. Westminster (3)
40. Woolton (3)

Wards from 1 April 1974 (first election 10 May 1973) to 1 May 1980:

1. Abercromby / St. James (3)
2. Aigburth (3)
3. Allerton (3)
4. Anfield (3)
5. Arundel (3)
6. Breckfield / St. Domingo (3)
7. Broadgreen (3)
8. Central / Everton / Netherfield (3)
9. Childwall (3)
10. Church (3)
11. Clubmoor (3)
12. County (3)
13. Croxteth (3)
14. Dingle (3)
15. Dovecot (3)
16. Fairfield (3)
17. Fazakerley (3)
18. Gillmoss (3)
19. Granby / Princes Park (3)
20. Kensington (3)
21. Low Hill / Smithdown (3)
22. Melrose / Westminster (3)
23. Old Swan (3)
24. Picton (3)
25. Pirrie (3)
26. Sandhills / Vauxhall (3)
27. St. Mary's (3)
28. St. Michael's (3)
29. Speke (3)
30. Tuebrook (3)
31. Warbreck (3)
32. Woolton East (3)
33. Woolton West (3)

Wards from 1 May 1980 to 10 June 2004:

1. Abercromby (3)
2. Aigburth (3)
3. Allerton (3)
4. Anfield (3)
5. Arundel (3)
6. Breckfield (3)
7. Broadgreen (3)
8. Childwall (3)
9. Church (3)
10. Clubmoor (3)
11. County (3)
12. Croxteth (3)
13. Dingle (3)
14. Dovecot (3)
15. Everton (3)
16. Fazakerley (3)
17. Gillmoss (3)
18. Granby (3)
19. Grassendale (3)
20. Kensington (3)
21. Melrose (3)
22. Netherley (3)
23. Old Swan (3)
24. Picton (3)
25. Pirrie (3)
26. St. Mary's (3)
27. Smithdown (3)
28. Speke (3)
29. Tuebrook (3)
30. Valley (3)
31. Vauxhall (3)
32. Warbreck (3)
33. Woolton (3)

Wards from 10 June 2004 to 3 May 2023:

1. Allerton and Hunts Cross (3)
2. Anfield (3)
3. Belle Vale (3)
4. Central (3)
5. Childwall (3)
6. Church (3)
7. Clubmoor (3)
8. County (3)
9. Cressington(3)
10. Croxteth (3)
11. Everton (3)
12. Fazakerley (3)
13. Greenbank (3)
14. Kensington and Fairfield (3)
15. Kirkdale (3)
16. Knotty Ash (3)
17. Mossley Hill (3)
18. Norris Green (3)
19. Old Swan (3)
20. Picton (3)
21. Princes Park (3)
22. Riverside (3)
23. St Michael's (3)
24. Speke-Garston (3)
25. Tuebrook and Stoneycroft (3)
26. Warbreck (3)
27. Wavertree (3)
28. West Derby (3)
29. Woolton (3)
30. Yew Tree (3)

Wards from 4 May 2023 to present:

1. Aigburth (1)
2. Allerton (1)
3. Anfield (2)
4. Arundel (1)
5. Belle Vale (2)
6. Broadgreen (1)
7. Brownlow Hill (2)
8. Calderstones (1)
9. Canning (2)
10. Childwall (2)
11. Church (1)
12. City Centre North (2)
13. City Centre South (3)
14. Clubmoor East (1)
15. Clubmoor West (1)
16. County (2)
17. Croxteth (1)
18. Croxteth Country Park (1)
19. Dingle (2)
20. Edge Hill (1)
21. Everton East (1)
22. Everton North (1)
23. Everton West (1)
24. Fazakerley East (1)
25. Fazakerley North (1)
26. Fazakerley West (1)
27. Festival Gardens (1)
28. Garston (2)
29. Gateacre (1)
30. Grassendale & Cressington (1)
31. Greenbank Park (1)
32. Kensington & Fairfield (3)
33. Kirkdale East (1)
34. Kirkdale West (1)
35. Knotty Ash & Dovecot Park (1)
36. Mossley Hill (1)
37. Much Woolton & Hunts Cross (2)
38. Norris Green (3)
39. Old Swan East (1)
40. Old Swan West (1)
41. Orrell Park (1)
42. Penny Lane (1)
43. Princes Park (1)
44. Sandfield Park (1)
45. Sefton Park (1)
46. Smithdown (2)
47. Speke (2)
48. Springwood (1)
49. St Michaels (1)
50. Stoneycroft (1)
51. Toxteth (1)
52. Tuebrook Breckside Park (1)
53. Tuebrook Larkhill (1)
54. Vauxhall (2)
55. Walton (1)
56. Waterfront North (1)
57. Waterfront South (1)
58. Wavertree Garden Suburb (1)
59. Wavertree Village (1)
60. West Derby Deysbrook (1)
61. West Derby Leyfield (1)
62. West Derby Muirhead (1)
63. Woolton Village (1)
64. Yew Tree (2)

=== Sefton ===
Wards from 1 April 1974 (first election 10 May 1973) to 3 May 1979:

1. No. 1 (Bootle: Derby and Stanley) (3)
2. No. 2 (Bootle: Linacre and Mersey) (3)
3. No. 3 (Bootle: Netherton) (3)
4. No. 4 (Bootle: Orrell) (3)
5. No. 5 (Bootle: Sefton) (3)
6. No. 6 (Southport: Ainsdale and Birkdale South) (6)
7. No. 7 (Southport: Birkdale East and North and South) (3)
8. No. 8 (Southport: Central-Birkdale West-West) (3)
9. No. 9 (Southport: Craven-Sussex-Talbot) (3)
10. No. 10 (Southport: Hesketh and Scarisbrick) (3)
11. No. 11 (Southport: Marine and Park) (3)
12. No. 12 (Crosby: Central-College-St. Johns) (3)
13. No. 13 (Crosby: Christchurch-St. Marys-St. Thomas) (3)
14. No. 14 (Crosby: East) (3)
15. No. 15 (Crosby: North and West) (3)
16. No. 16 (Formby: Duke Street and Raven Meols) (3)
17. No. 17 (Formby: Freshfield-Oldtown-St. Lukes) (3)
18. No. 18 (Litherland: Beach-Ford-Hatton Hill) (3)
19. No. 19 (Litherland: Church-Hornby-Osborne-Walker) (3)
20. No. 20 (Aintree) (3)
21. No. 21 (Maghull East and North Melling) (3)
22. No. 22 (Maghull South and West Melling) (3)

Wards from 3 May 1979 to 4 May 2000:

1. Ainsdale (3)
2. Birkdale (3)
3. Blundellsands (3)
4. Cambridge (3)
5. Church (3)
6. Derby (3)
7. Duke's (3)
8. Ford (3)
9. Harington (3)
10. Kew (3)
11. Linacre (3)
12. Litherland (3)
13. Manor (3)
14. Meols (3)
15. Molyneux (3)
16. Netherton (3)
17. Norwood (3)
18. Orrell (3)
19. Park (3)
20. Ravenmeols (3)
21. St. Oswald (3)
22. Sudell (3)
23. Victoria (3)

Wards from 4 May 2000 to 10 June 2004:

1. Ainsdale (3)
2. Birkdale (3)
3. Blundellsands (3)
4. Cambridge (3)
5. Church (3)
6. Derby (3)
7. Dukes (3)
8. Ford (3)
9. Harington (3)
10. Kew (3)
11. Linacre (3)
12. Litherland (3)
13. Manor (3)
14. Meols (3)
15. Molyneux (3)
16. Netherton and Orrell (3)
17. Norwood (3)
18. Park (3)
19. Ravenmeols (3)
20. St Oswald (3)
21. Sudell (3)
22. Victoria (3)

Wards from 10 June 2004 to 7 May 2026:

1. Ainsdale (3)
2. Birkdale (3)
3. Blundellsands (3)
4. Cambridge (3)
5. Church (3)
6. Derby (3)
7. Duke's (3)
8. Ford (3)
9. Harington (3)
10. Kew (3)
11. Linacre (3)
12. Litherland (3)
13. Manor (3)
14. Meols (3)
15. Molyneux (3)
16. Netherton and Orrell (3)
17. Norwood (3)
18. Park (3)
19. Ravenmeols (3)
20. St Oswald (3)
21. Sudell (3)
22. Victoria (3)

Wards from 7 May 2026 to present:

1. Ainsdale (3)
2. Aintree & Maghull South (3)
3. Birkdale (3)
4. Blundellsands (3)
5. Bootle East (3)
6. Bootle West (3)
7. Cambridge (3)
8. Duke’s (3)
9. Ford (3)
10. Formby East (3)
11. Formby West (3)
12. Great Crosby (3)
13. Kew (3)
14. Litherland (3)
15. Lydiate & Maghull West (3)
16. Maghull East (3)
17. Meols (3)
18. Netherton North (3)
19. Netherton South & Orrell (3)
20. Norwood (3)
21. Thornton & Hightown (3)
22. Waterloo (3)

=== St Helens ===
Wards from 1 April 1974 (first election 10 May 1973) to 1 May 1980:

1. No. 1 (St. Helens: Central and South Eccleston) (3)
2. No. 2 (St. Helens: East Sutton) (3)
3. No. 3 (St. Helens: Hardshaw and Parr) (6)
4. No. 4 (St. Helens: Moss Bank) (3)
5. No. 5 (St. Helens: North Eccleston and South Windle) (3)
6. No. 6 (St. Helens: North Windle) (3)
7. No. 7 (St. Helens: West Sutton) (3)
8. No. 8 (Haydock) (3)
9. No. 9 (Newton-Le-Willows: Crow Lane-Town Hall-Viaduct) (3)
10. No. 10 (Newton-le-Willows: Newton and Wargrave) (3)
11. Billinge and Seneley Green (3)
12. Rainford (3)
13. No. 13 (Eccleston and Windle) (3)
14. No. 14 (Rainhill and Bold) (3)

Wards from 1 May 1980 to 10 June 2004:

1. Billinge and Seneley Green (3)
2. Blackbrook (3)
3. Broad Oak (3)
4. Eccleston (3)
5. Grange Park (3)
6. Haydock (3)
7. Marshalls Cross (3)
8. Moss Bank (3)
9. Newton East (3)
10. Newton West (3)
11. Parr and Hardshaw (3)
12. Queen's Park (3)
13. Rainford (3)
14. Rainhill (3)
15. Sutton and Bold (3)
16. Thatto Heath (3)
17. West Sutton (3)
18. Windle (3)

Wards from 10 June 2004 to 5 May 2022:

1. Billinge and Seneley Green (3)
2. Blackbrook (3)
3. Bold (3)
4. Earlestown (3)
5. Eccleston (3)
6. Haydock (3)
7. Moss Bank (3)
8. Newton (3)
9. Parr (3)
10. Rainford (3)
11. Rainhill (3)
12. Sutton (3)
13. Thatto Heath (3)
14. Town Centre (3)
15. West Park (3)
16. Windle (3)

Wards from 5 May 2022 to present:

1. Billinge & Seneley Green (3)
2. Blackbrook (3)
3. Bold & Lea Green (3)
4. Eccleston (3)
5. Haydock (3)
6. Moss Bank (3)
7. Newton-le-Willows East (3)
8. Newton-le-Willows West (3)
9. Parr (3)
10. Peasley Cross & Fingerpost (1)
11. Rainford (2)
12. Rainhill (3)
13. Sutton North West (2)
14. Sutton South East (2)
15. Thatto Heath (3)
16. St Helens Town Centre (2)
17. West Park (3)
18. Windle (3)

=== Wirral ===
Wards from 1 April 1974 (first election 10 May 1973) to 1 May 1980:

1. No. 1 (Birkenhead: Argyle-Clifton-Holt) (3)
2. No. 2 (Birkenhead: Bebington and Mersey) (3)
3. No. 3 (Birkenhead: Cathcart-Claughton-Cleveland) (3)
4. No. 4 (Birkenhead: Devonshire and Egerton) (3)
5. No. 5 (Birkenhead: Gilbrook and St. James) (3)
6. No. 6 (Birkenhead: Grange and Oxton) (3)
7. No. 7 (Birkenhead: Prenton) (3)
8. No. 8 (Birkenhead: Upton) (3)
9. No. 9 (Wallasey: Leasowe) (3)
10. No. 10 (Wallasey: Marlowe-Egremont-South Liscard) (3)
11. No. 11 (Wallasey: Moreton and Saughall Massie) (3)
12. No. 12 (Wallasey: New Brighton-Wallasey-Warren) (3)
13. No. 13 (Wallasey: North Liscard-Upper Brighton-St. Hilary) (3)
14. No. 14 (Wallasey: Seacombe-Poulton-Somerville) (3)
15. No. 15 (Bebington: Higher Bebington and Woodhey) (3)
16. No. 16 (Bebington: Park-New Ferry-North Bromborough) (3)
17. No. 17 (Bebington: South Bromborough and Eastham) (3)
18. No. 18 (Bebington: Lower Bebington and Poulton) (3)
19. No. 19 (Hoylake: Caldy and Frankby) (3)
20. No. 20 (Hoylake: Central-Hoose-Meols-Park) (3)
21. No. 21 (Wirral: Barnston-Gayton-Heswall-Oldfield) (3)
22. No. 22 (Wirral: Irby-Pensby-Thurstaston) (3)

Wards from 1 May 1980 to 10 June 2004:

1. Bebington (3)
2. Bidston (3)
3. Birkenhead (3)
4. Bromborough (3)
5. Clatterbridge (3)
6. Claughton (3)
7. Eastham (3)
8. Egerton (3)
9. Heswall (3)
10. Hoylake (3)
11. Leasowe (3)
12. Liscard (3)
13. Moreton (3)
14. New Brighton (3)
15. Oxton (3)
16. Prenton (3)
17. Royden (3)
18. Seacombe (3)
19. Thurstaston (3)
20. Tranmere (3)
21. Upton (3)
22. Wallasey (3)

Wards from 10 June 2004 to present:

1. Bebington (3)
2. Bidston and St James (3)
3. Birkenhead and Tranmere (3)
4. Bromborough (3)
5. Clatterbridge (3)
6. Claughton (3)
7. Eastham (3)
8. Greasby, Frankby and Irby (3)
9. Heswall (3)
10. Hoylake and Meols (3)
11. Leasowe and Moreton East (3)
12. Liscard (3)
13. Moreton West and Saughall Massie (3)
14. New Brighton (3)
15. Oxton (3)
16. Pensby and Thingwall (3)
17. Prenton (3)
18. Rock Ferry (3)
19. Seacombe (3)
20. Upton (3)
21. Wallasey (3)
22. West Kirby and Thurstaston (3)

== Former county council ==
=== Merseyside ===
Electoral Divisions from 1 April 1974 (first election 12 April 1973) to 1 April 1986 (county council abolished):

1. Bebington No. 1 (1)
2. Bebington No. 2 (1)
3. Bebington No. 3 (1)
4. Bebington No. 4 (1)
5. Birkenhead No. 1 (1)
6. Birkenhead No. 2 (1)
7. Birkenhead No. 3 (1)
8. Birkenhead No. 4 (1)
9. Birkenhead No. 5 (1)
10. Birkenhead No. 6 (1)
11. Birkenhead No. 7 (Prenton) (1)
12. Birkenhead No. 8 (Upton) (1)
13. Bootle No. 1 (1)
14. Bootle No. 2 (1)
15. Bootle No. 3 (2)
16. Crosby No. 1 (1)
17. Crosby No. 2 (1)
18. Crosby No. 3 (1)
19. Crosby No. 4 (1)
20. Formby (1)
21. Haydock (1)
22. Hoylake No. 1 (1)
23. Hoylake No. 2 (1)
24. Huyton with Roby No. 1 (1)
25. Huyton with Roby No. 2 (1)
26. Huyton with Roby No. 3 (1)
27. Huyton with Roby No. 4 (1)
28. Kirkby No. 1 (1)
29. Kirkby No. 2 (1)
30. Kirkby No. 3 (1)
31. Litherland (1)
32. Liverpool No. 1 (Abercromby/St James) (1)
33. Liverpool No. 2 (Aigburth) (1)
34. Liverpool No. 3 (Allerton) (1)
35. Liverpool No. 4 (Anfield) (1)
36. Liverpool No. 5 (Arundel) (1)
37. Liverpool No. 6 (Breckfield/St Domingo) (1)
38. Liverpool No. 7 (Broadgreen) (1)
39. Liverpool No. 8 (Central/Everton/Netherfield) (1)
40. Liverpool No. 9 (Childwall) (2)
41. Liverpool No. 10 (Church) (1)
42. Liverpool No. 11 (Clubmoor) (1)
43. Liverpool No. 12 (County) (1)
44. Liverpool No. 13 (Croxteth) (1)
45. Liverpool No. 14 (Dingle) (1)
46. Liverpool No. 15 (Dovecot) (1)
47. Liverpool No. 16 (Fairfield) (1)
48. Liverpool No. 17 (Fazakerley) (1)
49. Liverpool No. 18 (Gillmoss) (2)
50. Liverpool No. 19 (Granby/Princes Park) (1)
51. Liverpool No. 20 (Kensington) (1)
52. Liverpool No. 21 (Low Hill/Smithdown) (1)
53. Liverpool No. 22 (Melrose/Westminster) (1)
54. Liverpool No. 23 (Old Swan) (1)
55. Liverpool No. 24 (Picton) (1)
56. Liverpool No. 25 (Pirrie) (1)
57. Liverpool No. 26 (St Marys) (1)
58. Liverpool No. 27 (St Michaels) (1)
59. Liverpool No. 28 (Sandhills/Vauxhall) (1)
60. Liverpool No. 29 (Speke) (1)
61. Liverpool No. 30 (Tuebrook) (1)
62. Liverpool No. 31 (Warbreck) (1)
63. Liverpool No. 32 (Woolton East) (1)
64. Liverpool No. 33 (Woolton West) (2)
65. Newton-le-Willows (1)
66. Prescot (1)
67. Rainford (1)
68. Southport No. 1 (1)
69. Southport No. 2 (1)
70. Southport No. 3 (1)
71. Southport No. 4 (1)
72. Southport No. 5 (1)
73. Southport No. 6 (1)
74. St Helens No. 1 (1)
75. St Helens No. 2 (East Sutton) (1)
76. St Helens No. 3 (1)
77. St Helens No. 4 (1)
78. St Helens No. 5 (1)
79. St Helens No. 6 (Parr) (1)
80. Wallasey No. 1 (Leasowe) (1)
81. Wallasey No. 2 (1)
82. Wallasey No. 3 (1)
83. Wallasey No. 4 (1)
84. Wallasey No. 5 (1)
85. Wallasey No. 6 (1)
86. West Lancashire No. 1 (1)
87. West Lancashire No. 2 (1)
88. West Lancashire No. 3 (1)
89. Whiston No. 1 (1)
90. Whiston No. 2 (1)
91. Whiston No. 3 (Halewood) (1)
92. Whiston No. 4 (Knowsley) (1)
93. Whiston No. 5 (1)
94. Wirral No. 1 (1)
95. Wirral No. 2 (1)

Electoral Divisions due from 2 May 1985 (order revoked by the Local Government Act 1985):

1. Abercromby (1)
2. Aigburth (1)
3. Ainsdale (1)
4. Aintree (1)
5. Allerton (1)
6. Alt (1)
7. Anfield (1)
8. Arundel (1)
9. Beacon (1)
10. Bebington (1)
11. Bidston (1)
12. Birkdale (1)
13. Birkenhead (1)
14. Breckfield (1)
15. Broadgreen (1)
16. Bromborough (1)
17. Buckley Hill (1)
18. Childwall (1)
19. Church (1)
20. Clatterbridge (1)
21. Claughton (1)
22. Clubmoor (1)
23. County (1)
24. Crosby North (1)
25. Crosby South (1)
26. Crossens (1)
27. Croxteth (1)
28. Dingle (1)
29. Dovecot (1)
30. Eastham (1)
31. Eccleston Mere (1)
32. Egerton (1)
33. Everton (1)
34. Fazakerley (1)
35. Fernhill (1)
36. Freshfield (1)
37. Gerard's Bridge (1)
38. Gillmoss (1)
39. Granby (1)
40. Grassendale (1)
41. Halewood Southwest (1)
42. Hawthorne (1)
43. Haydock Park (1)
44. Hesketh (1)
45. Heswall (1)
46. Hoylake (1)
47. Huyton East (1)
48. Huyton South (1)
49. Huyton West (1)
50. Kensington (1)
51. Knowsley Parish (1)
52. Leasowe (1)
53. Liscard (1)
54. Marine (1)
55. Melrose (1)
56. Mersey (1)
57. Moreton (1)
58. Netherley (1)
59. New Brighton (1)
60. Newton-le-Willows (1)
61. Old Swan (1)
62. Oxton (1)
63. Park (1)
64. Picton (1)
65. Pirrie (1)
66. Prenton (1)
67. Prescot (1)
68. Rainford and Windle (1)
69. Rainhill and Bold (1)
70. Rimrose (1)
71. Royden (1)
72. Sankey Valley (1)
73. Scarisbrick (1)
74. Seacombe (1)
75. Seaforth (1)
76. Sherdley (1)
77. Smithdown (1)
78. Southwood (1)
79. Speke (1)
80. St Helens Central (1)
81. St Mary's (1)
82. Sudell (1)
83. Sutton Oak (1)
84. Tarbock (1)
85. Thurstaston (1)
86. Tower Park (1)
87. Tranmere (1)
88. Tuebrook (1)
89. Upton (1)
90. Valley (1)
91. Vauxhall (1)
92. Wallasey (1)
93. Warbreck (1)
94. West Park (1)
95. Westdene (1)
96. Whiston (1)
97. Woolton (1)

== Electoral wards by constituency ==
Wards as they existed on 1 December 2020.

=== Birkenhead ===
Wirral: Bebington; Bidston & St. James; Birkenhead & Tranmere; Claughton; Oxton; Prenton; Rock Ferry.

=== Bootle ===
Sefton: Church; Derby; Ford; Linacre; Litherland; Netherton & Orrell; St. Oswald; Victoria.

=== Ellesmere Port and Bromborough (part) ===
Wirral: Bromborough; Eastham.

=== Knowsley ===
Knowsley: Cherryfield; Northwood; Prescot North; Roby; St. Gabriels; St. Michaels; Shevington; Stockbridge; Whitefield.

=== Liverpool Garston ===
Liverpool: Allerton & Hunts Cross; Belle Vale; Church; Cressington; Speke-Garston; Woolton.

=== Liverpool Riverside ===
Liverpool: Anfield; Central; Everton; Kirkdale; Princes Park; Riverside.

=== Liverpool Walton ===
Liverpool: Clubmoor; County; Croxteth; Fazakereley; Norris Green; Warbreck.

Sefton: Molyneux (polling districts C4, C5 & C6).

=== Liverpool Wavertree ===
Liverpool: Childwall; Greenbank; Kensington & Fairfield; Mossley Hill; Picton; St. Michael’s; Wavertree.

=== Liverpool West Derby ===
Knowsley: Page Moss; Swanside.

Liverpool: Knotty Ash; Old Swan; Tuebrook & Stoneycroft; West Derby; Yew Tree.

=== Sefton Central ===
Sefton: Ainsdale; Blundellsands; Harington; Manor; Molyneux (polling districts C1, C2 & C3); Park; Ravenmeols; Sudell.

=== Southport (part) ===
Sefton: Birkdale; Cambridge; Duke’s; Kew; Meols; Norwood.

=== St Helens North ===
St Helens: Billinge & Seneley Green; Blackbrook; Earlestown; Haydock; Moss Bank; Newton; Parr; Rainford; Windle.

=== St Helens South and Whiston ===
Knowsley: Prescot South; Whiston & Cronton (polling district WC5).

St Helens: Bold; Eccleston; Rainhill; Sutton; Thatto Heath; Town Centre; West Park.

=== Wallasey ===
Wirral: Leasowe & Moreton East; Liscard; Moreton West & Saughall Massie; New Brighton; Seacombe; Upton (polling districts MA & MB); Wallasey.

=== Widnes and Halewood (part) ===
Knowsley: Halewood North; Halewood South; Whiston & Cronton (polling districts WC1, WC1A, WC2, WC3 & WC4).

=== Wirral West ===
Wirral: Clatterbridge; Greasby, Frankby & Irby; Heswall; Hoylake & Meols; Pensby & Thingwall; Upton (polling districts MC, MD & ME); West Kirby & Thurstaston.

== See also ==
- List of parliamentary constituencies in Merseyside
