= Carl Cashman =

Liberal Democrat Politician

Cllr Carl Cashman
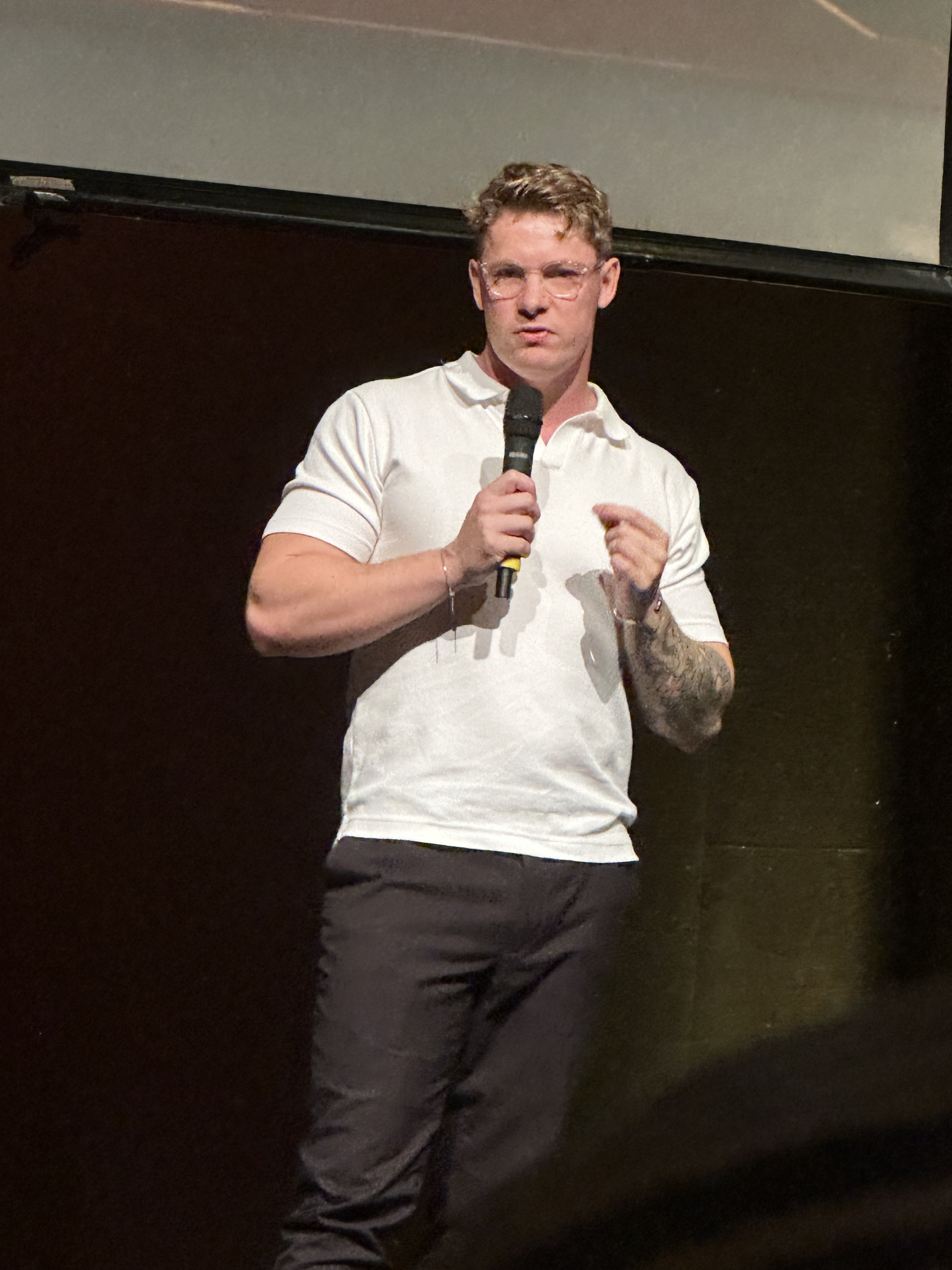
- Cashman at Young Liberals Summer Conference in 2025

Leader of the Liberal Democrats on Liverpool City Council
- Incumbent
- Assumed office 9 May 2023
- Preceded by: Richard Kemp

Liverpool City Council Councillor for Church
- Incumbent
- Assumed office 5 May 2023
- Preceded by: Ward established

Knowsley Metropolitan Borough Council Councillor for Prescot North
- In office 5 May 2016 – 25 March 2023
- Preceded by: Ward established
- Succeeded by: Mark Burke

Personal details
- Born: October 25, 1991 (age 35) Prescot, England
- Party: Liberal Democrats
- Education: University of Liverpool
- Website: carlcashman.org

Carl Cashman (October 25, 1991) is an English–French politician who has served as the councillor for Church ward on the Liverpool City Council since 2023. He also serves as the leader of the Liverpool Liberal Democrats, the second largest party group on the city council, making him leader of the opposition.

A former councillor on Knowsley Metropolitan Borough Council, Cashman previously ran for election as Mayor of the Liverpool City Region in 2017, and as MP for Knowsley in 2015 and 2017. He is the lead for inclusive growth in the Local Government Association's Liberal Democrat Group. Outside politics, Cashman works as a mortgage broker.

== Early life ==
Cashman was born in Prescot, Merseyside. Born to an English-French mother, Cashman holds French citizenship from his mother alongside his British citizenship. He has described growing up in a council house in Liverpool with his grandparents, whom he credits with shaping his values. He attended St Francis Xavier's College, Liverpool and the University of Liverpool, where he received a joint honours degree in philosophy and politics, and was taught by Stuart Wilks-Heeg.

== Career ==
=== Knowsley Metropolitan Borough Council ===
Cashman was formerly the leader of the Knowsley Liberal Democrats. He was first elected to Knowsley Metropolitan Borough Council for Prescot North in May 2016, receiving 1,254 votes (50.5%). He was re-elected in 2021 with 1,448 votes (60.8%). He was also elected to Knowsley Town Council for Knowsley Park North in October 2016, standing down in 2018.

=== UK Parliament candidacy ===
He stood as the Liberal Democrat candidate for the parliamentary constituency of Knowsley at the 2015 and 2017 general elections, finishing fourth on both occasions with 1,490 votes (2.9%) in 2015 and 1,189 votes (2.1%) in 2017.

=== Liverpool City Region mayoralty ===
Cashman ran against Steve Rotheram in the 2017 Liverpool City Region mayoral election. He received 19,751 votes, 6.8% of the total, coming third. His policies including setting up a representative office for Liverpool in Brussels, support for EU membership, protecting green spaces and removing tolls for Liverpool's tunnels.

=== Liverpool City Council ===
Cashman resigned his Knowsley Metropolitan Borough Council seat in 2023 to contest Liverpool City Council's Church ward, where he was elected with 1,165 votes (55.4%). He is the current leader of the Liverpool Liberal Democrats, a position he has held since May 2023. He succeeded former leader Richard Kemp after an 11-year tenure as leader of the local party. He was re-elected as leader in May 2025.

In July 2025, Cashman said that his ambition was to lead Liverpool City Council, and has argued that the Liverpool Liberal Democrats had built the membership, organisation and campaigning infrastructure needed to challenge Labour's dominance on the council, which have been in power since 2010. In August 2025, Cashman called for Liverpool to become a target for the Liberal Democrats, arguing that the national party should seek to build on its local strength in the city.

He has described his priorities for Liverpool as increasing council housebuilding, addressing homelessness and temporary accommodation, improving street cleanliness and giving residents a greater voice in their communities. He has advocated policies aimed at tackling deprivation through increased investment in housing and local communities, arguing that Liverpool City Council should play a greater role in improving living conditions and expanding opportunities for residents. In October 2025, under Cashman's leadership, the Liverpool Liberal Democrats proposed a "city of villages" vision for Liverpool, including new council housing and neighbourhoods designed around local community facilities. In August 2026, with the national party's deputy leader Daisy Cooper, he launched the local party's Liverpool First policy paper, outlining proposals to support local businesses, attract investment, develop cultural and maritime districts, and strengthen the city's economy.

Cashman has described himself as a liberal and progressive, arguing that Liberalism should be viewed as distinct from the traditional left–right political spectrum. He has also expressed support for mutual and cooperative ownership and said he would not rule out standing for Parliament again – although he emphasised his commitment to local government in Liverpool.

=== Local Government Association ===
Cashman has held several positions representing the Local Government Association (LGA)'s Liberal Democrat Group, including membership of the LGA's Children and Young People Board in 2017–19, its Culture, Tourism and Sport Board in 2019–21, as a substitute on its City Regions Board from 2021–23, and on its Local Infrastructure and Net Zero Board from 2024–25. In June 2025, the LGA Liberal Democrat Group elected him lead of the City Regions Board. The LGA subsequently discontinued the City Regions Board and distributed its successful candidates between the new Inclusive Growth Committee and Public Service Reform and Innovation Committee; Cashman became the LGA Liberal Democrat Group's lead for Inclusive Growth and is currently vice chair of the LGA's Inclusive Growth Committee.

== Media attention ==
Cashman received media attention for his appearance and has been dubbed "Britain's sexiest politician". He was the subject of an American right-wing Twitter discussion garnering millions of views, wrongly labelling him 'Conservative Chad'. Cashman responded in an interview with The Tab, saying:

If it strengthens the liberal cause, and puts the lens on my city – and its incredibly good looking population – then I'll take that. As for calling me a normie Conservative Chad, I couldn’t be further from that. I'm what he would call a lefty liberal, his worst nightmare!

In 2025, he was interviewed on his personal life and politics by drag queen Tiara Skye in Soho. In July 2026, Cashman appeared on the cover of LGBTQ magazine Attitude – telling the magazine that the Liberal Democrats were "fiercely pro-trans rights" – whilst reaffirming his support for the LGBTQ+ community in a discussion about his work promoting "positive masculinity".
