= 2015 Knowsley Metropolitan Borough Council election =

2015 local election in England

Results of the 2015 Knowsley Metropolitan Borough Council election

The 2015 Knowsley Metropolitan Borough Council election took place on 7 May 2015 to elect members of Knowsley Metropolitan Borough Council in England. This was on the same day as other local elections.

== Council make up ==
After the 2015 local election, the political make up of the council was as follows:

Party	Number of councillors
Labour	63
Conservative	0
Liberal Democrats	0
UKIP	0
Green	0
Independent	0
