= 2018 Knowsley Metropolitan Borough Council election =

2018 local election in England

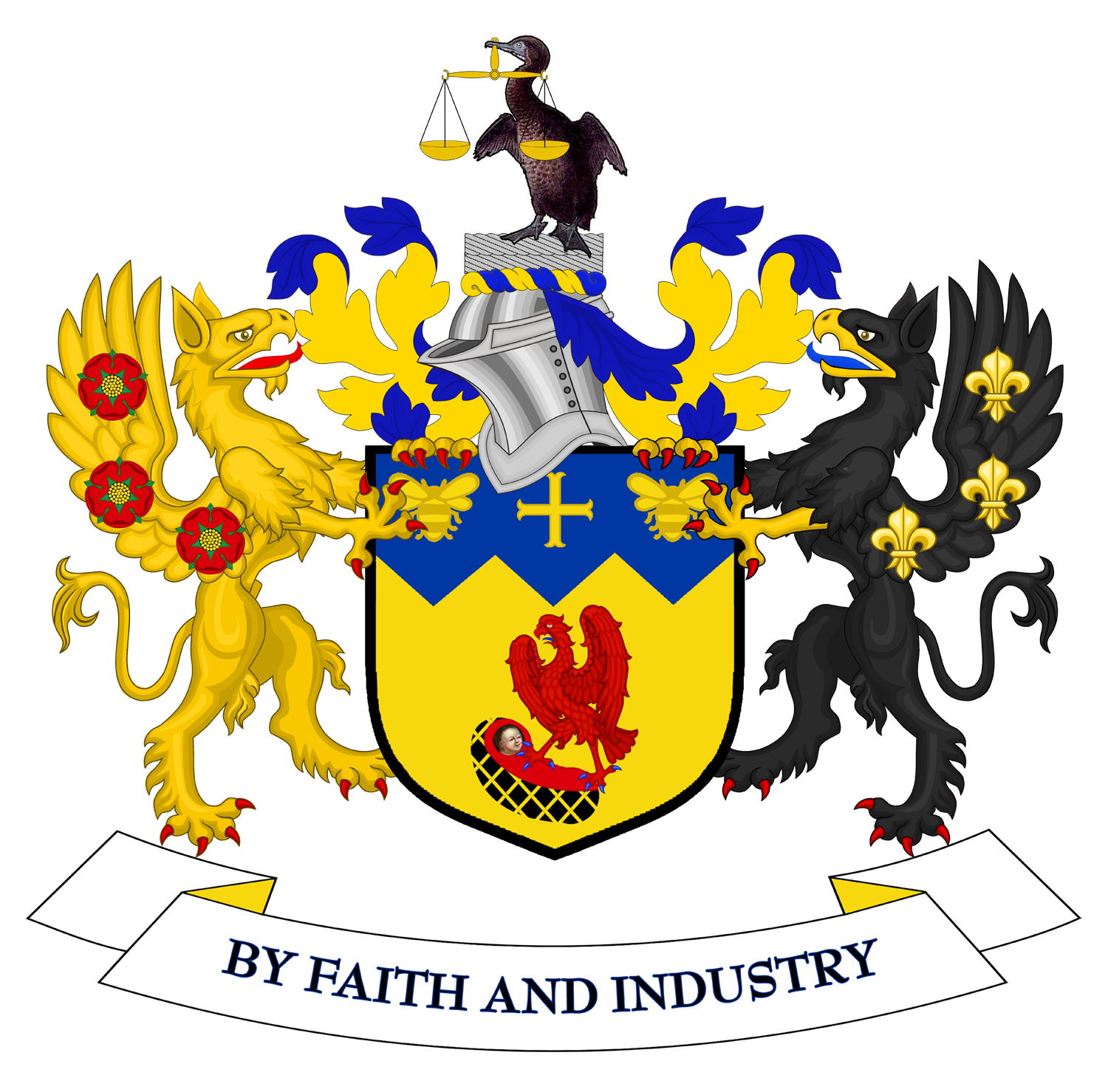
← 2016	3 May 2018	2019 →

15 of 45 seats (One Third) to Knowsley Metropolitan Borough Council 23 seats needed for a majority
- Turnout: 25.0% (▼0.9%)
	First party	Second party
	Lab	Grn
Leader	Andy Moorhead	Kai Taylor
Party	Labour	Green
Leader since	22 May 2015	3 May 2018
Leader's seat	Page Moss	Prescot South
Last election	42 seats, 60.6%	0 seats, 4.6%
Seats before	42	0
Seats won	12	1
Seats after	40	1
Seat change	▼2	▲1
Popular vote	19,007	3,553
Percentage	66.2%	12.4%
Swing	▲5.6%	▲7.8%
	Third party	Fourth party
	Ind	LD
Leader	Allan Harvey	Carl Cashman
Party	Independent	Liberal Democrats
Leader since	3 May 2018	5 May 2016
Leader's seat	Halewood South	Prescot North
Last election	0 seats, 7.1%	3 seats, 7.2%
Seats before	0	3
Seats won	1	1
Seats after	1	3
Seat change	▲1	Steady
Popular vote	2,151	1,958
Percentage	7.5%	6.8%
Swing	▲0.4%	▼0.4%
Leader of the Council before election
Andy Moorhead
Labour
Leader of the Council after Election
Graham Morgan
Labour

The 2018 Knowsley Metropolitan Borough Council Election took place on 3 May 2018 to elect members of Knowsley Metropolitan Borough Council in England. This was on the same day as other local elections.

== Summary ==
After the election, the composition of the borough council was:

Party	Seats	±
Labour	40	▼2
Liberal Democrats	3	Steady
Green	1	▲1
Independent	1	▲1

=== Overall election result ===
Knowsley Council Election Results Map 2018

Knowsley Metropolitan Borough Council Election Results, 2018
Party	Candidates						Votes		
Party	Stood	Elected	Gained	Unseated	Net	% of total	%	No.	Net %
Labour	15	12	0	2	▼2	80.0	66.2	19,007	▲5.6
Green	7	1	1	0	▲1	6.7	12.4	3,553	▲7.8
Independent	5	1	1	0	▲1	6.7	7.5	2,151	▲0.4
Liberal Democrats	4	1	0	0	Steady	6.7	6.8	1,958	▼0.4
Conservative	9	0	0	0	Steady	0.0	5.4	1,546	▼1.4
UKIP	3	0	0	0	Steady	0.0	1.2	334	▼2.9
TUSC	1	0	0	0	Steady	0.0	0.5	156	▼2.8

=== Changes in council composition ===
Prior to the election the composition of the council was:

↓
42	3
Lab	LD

After the election, the composition of the council was:

↓
40	3	1	1
Lab	LD	G	I

=== Votes summary ===
Popular vote
Labour	66.2%
Green	12.4%
Independent	7.5%
Liberal Democrats	6.8%
Conservative	5.4%
Others	1.7%

=== Seats summary ===
Wards won
Labour	80.0%
Green	6.7%
Independent	6.7%
Liberal Democrats	6.7%

== Ward results ==
Results compared directly with the last local election in 2016.

=== Cherryfield ===
Cherryfield
Party	Candidate	Votes	%	±%
Labour	David Lonergan	1,329	82.0	▲20.0
Green Party - Save Our Green Space	Michael Dooley	188	11.6	New
Conservative	Adam Butler	103	6.4	▲0.3
Majority		1,141	70.4	▲40.2
Registered electors		7,994		
Turnout		1,626	20.3	
Rejected ballots		6	0.4	
Labour hold		Swing	▲20.1	

=== Halewood North ===
Halewood North
Party	Candidate	Votes	%	±%
Labour	Terry Powell	1,419	66.5	▲8.3
Independent	Bob Swann	447	20.9	▲6.8
Liberal Democrats	Jenny McNeilis	268	12.6	New
Majority		972	45.6	▲3.0
Registered electors		8,247		
Turnout		2,145	26.0	
Rejected ballots		11	0.5	
Labour hold		Swing	▲1.5	

=== Halewood South ===
Halewood South
Party	Candidate	Votes	%	±%
Independent	Allan Harvey	1,231	47.3	▲25.5
Labour	Gary See	1,190	45.8	▼6.6
Conservative	Graham Tubey	180	6.9	▼1.5
Majority		41	1.5	N/A
Registered electors		8,138		
Turnout		2,610	32.1	
Rejected ballots		9	0.3	
Independent gain from Labour		Swing	▲16.1	

=== Northwood ===
Northwood
Party	Candidate	Votes	%	±%
Labour	Harry Bell	1,439	86.5	▲20.3
Green Party - Save Our Green Space	Russell Greenway	225	13.5	New
Majority		1,214	73.0	▲40.6
Registered electors		8,399		
Turnout		1,673	19.9	
Rejected ballots		9	0.5	
Labour hold		Swing	▲20.3	

=== Page Moss ===
Page Moss
Party	Candidate	Votes	%	±%
Labour Co-op	Andy Moorhead	1,152	80.1	▲4.3
Green Party - Save Our Green Space	Kirk Sandringham	287	19.9	▼4.3
Majority		865	60.2	▲8.4
Registered electors		7,737		
Turnout		1,450	18.7	
Rejected ballots		11	0.8	
Labour Co-op hold		Swing	▲4.3	

=== Prescot North ===
Prescot North
Party	Candidate	Votes	%	±%
Liberal Democrats	Frances Wynn	1,373	60.3	▲9.8
Labour	Tony Ely	781	34.3	▲0.5
Conservative	Aaron Waters	124	5.4	▼1.4
Majority		592	26.0	▲9.3
Registered electors		7,580		
Turnout		2,283	30.1	
Rejected ballots		5	0.2	
Liberal Democrats hold		Swing	▲3.5	

=== Prescot South ===
Prescot South
Party	Candidate	Votes	%	±%
Green	Kai Taylor	1,520	65.5	New
Labour	Lynn O’Keeffe	736	31.7	▼31.4
Conservative	Sheila Webster	64	2.8	▼6.6
Majority		784	33.8	N/A
Registered electors		7,079		
Turnout		2,322	32.8	
Rejected ballots		2	0.1	
Green gain from Labour		Swing	▲30.7	

=== Roby ===
Roby
Party	Candidate	Votes	%	±%
Labour	Kevin Bannon	1,299	56.1	▲7.1
Green Party - Save Our Green Space	Martin Mackerel	510	22.0	▲9.1
Conservative	Antony Reed	400	17.3	▲4.4
Independent	Jayne Tattan	107	4.6	New
Majority		789	34.1	▲3.3
Registered electors		7,460		
Turnout		2,320	31.1	
Rejected ballots		4	0.2	
Labour hold		Swing	▲1.7	

=== Shevington ===
Shevington
Party	Candidate	Votes	%	±%
Labour	Tommy Rowe	1,402	90.0	▲13.5
TUSC	Neill Dunne	156	10.0	▼13.5
Majority		1,246	80.0	▲27.0
Registered electors		7,597		
Turnout		1,574	20.7	
Rejected ballots		16	1.0	
Labour hold		Swing	▲13.5	

=== St Gabriel's ===
St Gabriel's
Party	Candidate	Votes	%	±%
Labour	Dot Johnson	1,352	76.7	▲8.7
Liberal Democrats	Dean Boyle	153	8.7	New
UKIP	Fred Fricker	131	7.4	▼18.1
Conservative	Victoria Smart	127	7.2	▲0.6
Majority		1,199	68.0	▲25.5
Registered electors		7,239		
Turnout		1,770	24.5	
Rejected ballots		7	0.4	
Labour hold		Swing	▲12.8	

=== St Michael's ===
St Michael's
Party	Candidate	Votes	%	±%
Labour	Kay Moorhead	1,267	84.7	▲10.3
Conservative	Sheila Scott	118	7.9	▼0.4
UKIP	John Price	111	7.4	▼9.9
Majority		1,149	76.8	▲19.7
Registered electors		7,079		
Turnout		1,505	21.3	
Rejected ballots		9	0.6	
Labour hold		Swing	▲9.9	

=== Stockbridge ===
Stockbridge
Party	Candidate	Votes	%	±%
Labour	Dennis Baum	1,189	76.7	▲5.7
Green Party - Save Our Green Space	Paul Ryan	189	12.2	New
Independent	Paul Woods	173	11.2	▼17.8
Majority		1,000	64.5	▲22.5
Registered electors		7,963		
Turnout		1,556	19.5	
Rejected ballots		5	0.3	
Labour hold		Swing	▲11.3	

=== Swanside ===
Swanside
Party	Candidate	Votes	%	±%
Labour	Colin Dever	1,666	81.3	▲5.4
Independent	Johnny Webster	193	9.4	New
Conservative	Carole Sullivan	190	9.3	▼1.1
Majority		1,473	71.9	▲9.8
Registered electors		7,456		
Turnout		2,057	27.6	
Rejected ballots		8	0.4	
Labour hold		Swing	▲4.9	

=== Whiston and Cronton ===
Whiston and Cronton
Party	Candidate	Votes	%	±%
Labour	Gillian Flatley	1,207	55.5	▼11.2
Green Party - Save Our Green Space	Ron Gaffney	634	29.2	New
Conservative	Carl Cross	240	11.0	▼1.6
UKIP	Neil Miney	92	4.2	New
Majority		573	26.3	▼19.7
Registered electors		7,480		
Turnout		2,179	29.1	
Rejected ballots		6	0.3	
Labour hold		Swing	▼9.9	

=== Whitefield ===
Whitefield
Party	Candidate	Votes	%	±%
Labour	Louise Harbour	1,579	90.6	▲45.3
Liberal Democrats	Les Rigby	164	9.4	New
Majority		1,415	81.2	▲64.6
Registered electors		7,924		
Turnout		1,763	22.3	
Rejected ballots		20	1.1	
Labour hold		Swing	▲32.3	

== Changes between 2018 and 2019 ==
=== Halewood South by-election 2018 ===
By-election, 23 August 2018: Halewood South
Party	Candidate	Votes	%	±%
Labour	Gary See	1,012	51.6	▲5.8
Independent	Bob Swann	778	39.7	▼7.6
Liberal Democrats	Jenny McNeilis	118	6.0	New
Conservative	Ruth Smart	54	2.8	▼4.1
Majority		234	11.9	N/A
Turnout		1,968		
Rejected ballots		6	0.3	Steady
Labour hold		Swing	▲6.7	

== Notes ==
• italics denote a sitting councillor • bold denotes the winning candidate
