= Huyton Municipal Building =

Municipal building in Huyton, Merseyside, England

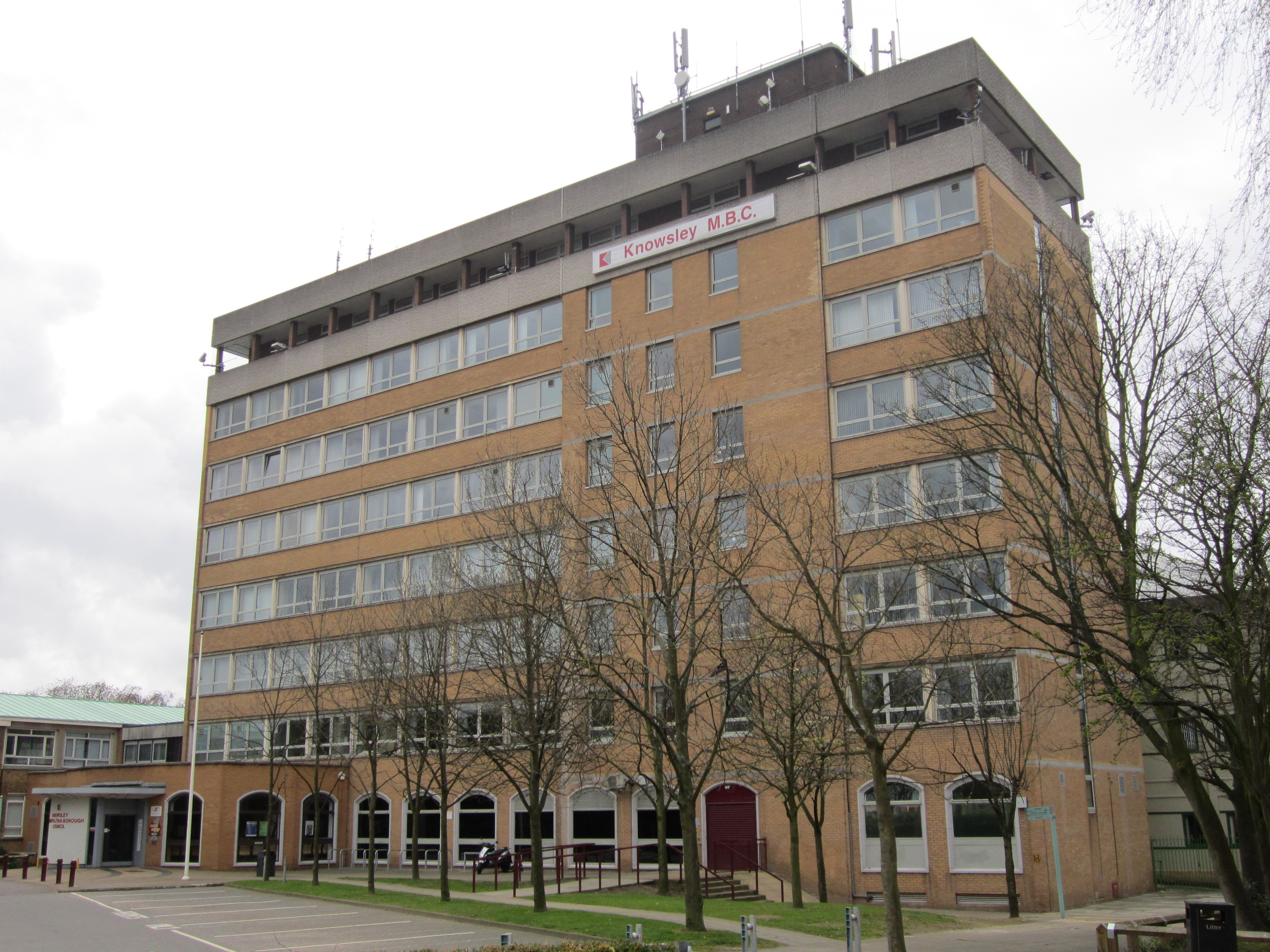
- The building in 2012

- Shown in Merseyside
- 53.4116°N 2.8407°W
- Location: Archway Road, Huyton

History
- Built: 1963

Site notes
- Architect: Henry Kay Pilkinton
- Architectural style: Modern style

Huyton Municipal Building is a municipal building in Archway Road, Huyton, a town in Merseyside, England. The building currently serves as the headquarters of Knowsley Metropolitan Borough Council.

== History ==
Following significant population growth, largely associated with the mining industry, a local board of health was established in Huyton-with-Roby in 1877. Meetings of the local board were held at Huyton and Roby schools in Dam House Lane (now Rupert Road), but after the local board was succeeded by Huyton with Roby Urban District Council in 1895, the new council established its offices in a large redbrick building designed in the Victorian style on the east side of Derby Road. The building in Derby Road continued to serve as the offices and meeting place of the district council throughout the first half of the 20th century, but by the middle of the century the area was very dilapidated. The old council offices and surrounding buildings were then demolished to make way for the Sherborne Square Shopping Centre.

A new building was commissioned as the first element of a wider redevelopment of Huyton town centre. The site the council selected was open land on the east side of Archway Road. Construction work started on site in 1962. The new building was designed under the supervision of the town surveyor, Henry Kay Pilkinton, in the Modern style and was officially opened in November 1963. A larger building was added to the original two storey block in 1973/74. The design involved a main frontage of 13 bays facing southwest, with the northwest end facing onto Archway Road. It was eight storeys high and featured alternating bands of brown brick and glass.

The building continued to serve as the headquarters of the district council for the next decade and then became the headquarters of the enlarged Knowsley Metropolitan Borough Council which was formed in 1974. In December 2023 a joint venture between the charity, Genr8, and the Japanese developer, Kajima Regeneration, submitted proposals on behalf of Knowsley Council to demolish the building, which the council described as "inefficient in terms of energy use and size", and to replace it with a new commercial district, which would incorporate new council offices and a village green.
