= 2019 Knowsley Metropolitan Borough Council election =

2019 local election in England

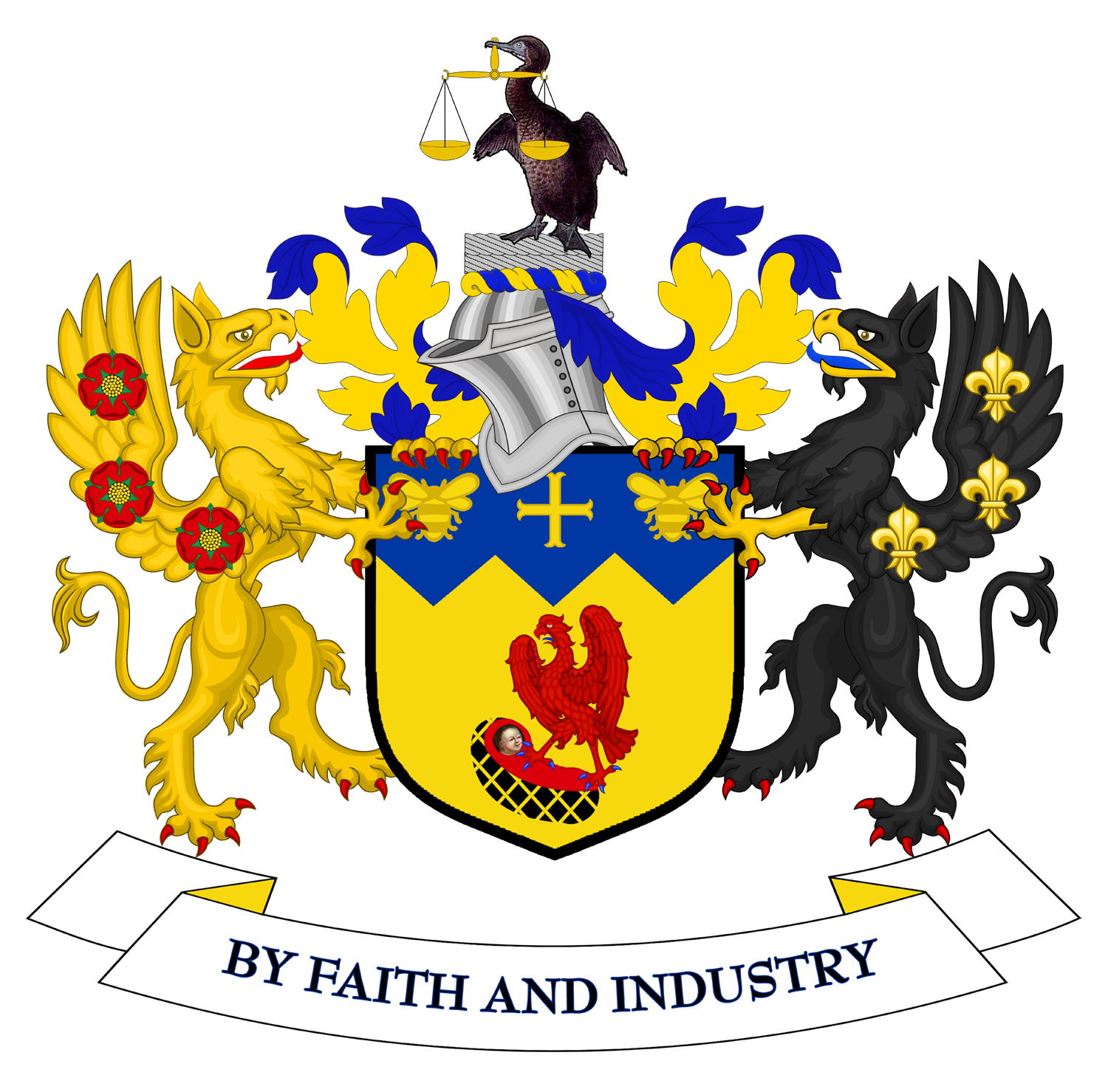
- 2 May 2019

15 of 45 seats (One Third) to Knowsley Metropolitan Borough Council 23 seats needed for a majority
- Turnout: 23.7% (▼1.3%)
	First party	Second party
Party	Labour	Green
Last election	12 seats, 66.2%	1 seat, 12.4%
Seats before	40	1
Seats won	11	2
Seats after	37	3
Seat change	▼3	▲2
Popular vote	15,877	5,665
Percentage	58.4%	20.9%
Swing	▼7.8%	▲8.5%
	Third party	Fourth party
Party	Independent	Liberal Democrats
Last election	1 seat, 7.5%	1 seat, 6.8%
Seats before	1	3
Seats won	1	1
Seats after	2	3
Seat change	▲1	Steady
Popular vote	2,040	1,589
Percentage	7.5%	5.8%
Swing	Steady	▼1.0%
Council control before election
{{{before_election}}}
Labour
Subsequent council control
Labour

The 2019 Knowsley Metropolitan Borough Council election took place on 2 May 2019 to elect members of Knowsley Metropolitan Borough Council in England. This election was held on the same day as other local elections.

== Summary ==
After the election, the composition of the council was:

Party	Seats	±
Labour	37	-3
Green	3	+2
Liberal Democrat	3	±0
Independent	2	+1
Source: The Guardian

== Results ==
=== Overall election result ===
Overall result compared with 2018.

Knowsley Council Election Results Map 2019

2019 Knowsley Metropolitan Borough Council election
Party	This election			Full council			This election		
Party	Seats	Net	Seats %	Other	Total	Total %	Votes	Votes %	+/−
Labour	11	▼3	73.3	26	37	82.2	15,877	58.4	–7.8
Green	2	▲2	13.3	1	3	6.7	5,665	20.9	+8.5
Liberal Democrats	1	Steady	6.7	2	3	6.7	1,589	5.8	–1.0
Independent	1	▲1	6.7	1	2	4.4	2,040	7.5	±0.0
Conservative	0	Steady	0.0	0	0	0.0	1,754	6.5	+1.1
Socialist Alternative	0	Steady	0.0	0	0	0.0	242	0.9	+0.4

== Ward results ==
=== Cherryfield ===
Cherryfield
Party	Candidate	Votes	%	±%
Labour	Jayne Aston	1,089	71.0	−11.0
Green	Michael Dooley	375	24.5	+12.9
Conservative	Ken Wilson	69	4.5	−1.9
Majority		714	46.6	−23.8
Turnout		1,550	18.9	−1.4
Rejected ballots		17	1.1	+0.7
Labour hold		Swing	-12.0	

=== Halewood North ===
Halewood North
Party	Candidate	Votes	%	±%
Labour	Shelley Powell	1,071	54.4	−12.1
Independent	Eric McIntosh	771	39.2	+18.3
Conservative	Mark Thomas	127	6.4	N/A
Majority		300	15.2	−30.3
Turnout		1,991	24.0	−2.1
Rejected ballots		22	1.1	+0.6
Labour hold		Swing	-15.2	

=== Halewood South ===
Halewood South
Party	Candidate	Votes	%	±%
Independent	Barbara Dunn	1,269	53.9	+6.6
Labour	Gary See	1,007	42.8	−3.0
Conservative	Adam Galloway	77	3.3	−3.6
Majority		262	11.1	+9.5
Turnout		2,362	29.2	−2.9
Rejected ballots		9	0.4	+0.1
Independent gain from Labour		Swing	+4.8	

=== Northwood ===
Northwood
Party	Candidate	Votes	%	±%
Labour	Marie Stuart	1,154	76.0	−10.5
Green	Russell Greenway	296	19.5	+6.0
Conservative	Pamela Turner	69	4.5	N/A
Majority		858	56.5	−16.5
Turnout		1,539	18.3	−1.6
Rejected ballots		20	1.3	+0.8
Labour hold		Swing	-8.3	

=== Page Moss ===
Page Moss
Party	Candidate	Votes	%	±%
Labour	Del Arnall	1,027	69.2	−10.9
Green	John Carine	382	25.7	+5.8
Conservative	Andrew Copplestone	76	5.1	N/A
Majority		645	43.4	−16.7
Turnout		1,497	18.8	+0.1
Rejected ballots		12	0.8	Steady
Labour hold		Swing	-8.4	

=== Prescot North ===
Prescot North
Party	Candidate	Votes	%	±%
Liberal Democrats	Ian Smith	1,364	59.9	−0.4
Labour	Tony Ely	790	34.7	+0.4
Conservative	Gary McCormick	123	5.4	Steady
Majority		574	25.2	−0.8
Turnout		2,322	30.0	−0.1
Rejected ballots		45	1.9	+1.7
Liberal Democrats hold		Swing	-0.4	

=== Prescot South ===
Prescot South
Party	Candidate	Votes	%	±%
Green	Joanne Burke	1,424	67.7	+2.2
Labour	Denise Allen	615	29.2	−2.5
Conservative	Gary Robertson	65	3.1	+0.3
Majority		809	38.5	+4.7
Turnout		2,116	29.4	−3.4
Rejected ballots		12	0.6	+0.5
Green gain from Labour		Swing	+2.4	

=== Roby ===
Roby
Party	Candidate	Votes	%	±%
Labour	Hughie Malone	1,103	47.9	−8.2
Green	Kirk Sandringham	1,002	43.5	+21.5
Conservative	Victoria Smart	196	8.5	−8.8
Majority		101	4.4	−29.7
Turnout		2,330	31.0	−0.1
Rejected ballots		29	1.2	+1.0
Labour hold		Swing	-14.9	

=== Shevington ===
Shevington
Party	Candidate	Votes	%	±%
Labour	Tony Brennan	1,139	77.2	−12.8
Socialist Alternative	Neil Dunne	242	16.4	+6.4
Conservative	John Aspinall	95	6.4	N/A
Majority		897	60.8	−19.2
Turnout		1,495	19.2	−1.5
Rejected ballots		19	1.3	+0.3
Labour hold		Swing	-9.6	

=== St Gabriels ===
St Gabriels
Party	Candidate	Votes	%	±%
Labour	Crispin Evans	1,345	86.8	+10.1
Conservative	Antony Read	205	13.2	+6.0
Majority		1,140	73.5	
Turnout		1,615		
Rejected ballots		65	4.0	
Labour hold		Swing	▲2.0	

=== St Michaels ===
St Michaels
Party	Candidate	Votes	%	±%
Labour	Mike Kearns	1,069	76.1	−8.6
Liberal Democrats	Michael Seed	225	16.0	N/A
Conservative	James Fletcher	111	7.9	±0.0
Majority		844	60.1	
Turnout		1,439		
Rejected ballots		34	2.4	
Labour hold		Swing		

=== Stockbridge ===
Stockbridge
Party	Candidate	Votes	%	±%
Labour	John Donnelly	997	74.5	−2.2
Green	Paul Ryan	270	20.2	+8.0
Conservative	Graham Tubey	72	5.4	N/A
Majority		727	54.3	
Turnout		1,361		
Rejected ballots		22	1.6	
Labour hold		Swing	▼5.1	

=== Swanside ===
Swanside
Party	Candidate	Votes	%	±%
Labour	Chris Bannon	1,208	56.9	−24.4
Green	Paul Woodruff	835	39.3	N/A
Conservative	Jack Boyd	80	3.8	−5.5
Majority		373	17.6	−54.3
Turnout		2,143	28.3	+0.7
Rejected ballots		20	0.9	+0.5
Labour hold		Swing	-27.2	

=== Whiston and Cronton ===
Whiston and Cronton
Party	Candidate	Votes	%	±%
Green	Ron Gaffney	1,082	51.6	+22.4
Labour	Tony Newman	863	41.2	−14.3
Conservative	Aaron Waters	150	7.2	−3.8
Majority		219	10.4	N/A
Turnout		2,119	28.4	−0.7
Rejected ballots		24	1.1	+0.8
Green gain from Labour		Swing	+18.4	

=== Whitefield ===
Whitefield
Party	Candidate	Votes	%	±%
Labour	John Morgan	1,400	85.4	−5.2
Conservative	Darren Melling	240	14.6	N/A
Majority		1,160	70.7	
Turnout		1,696		
Rejected ballots		56	3.3	
Labour hold		Swing		
