= Church (Liverpool ward) =

Metropolitan borough council ward in England

Coordinates: 53.387°N 2.920°W

- Church ward within Liverpool
- Population: 6,795 (2021 census)
- Registered Electors: 4,883 (2023 elections)
- Metropolitan borough: City of Liverpool
- Metropolitan county: Merseyside
- Region: North West
- Country: England
- Sovereign state: United Kingdom
- UK Parliament: Liverpool Wavertree
- Councillors: Carl Cashman (Liberal Democrat)

Church ward is an electoral district of Liverpool City Council. The ward is within the Liverpool Wavertree Parliamentary constituency.

== Background ==
The ward was created in 1953 and elected three councillors. The boundaries of the ward were changed for the 1973, 1980, 2004 and 2023 elections.

=== 1980 boundaries ===
1980 ward boundaries

A report of the Local Government Boundary Commission for England published in November 1978 set out proposals for changes to the wards of Liverpool City Council, maintaining the number of councillors at 99 representing 33 wards. Church ward was represented by three councillors.

The report describes the boundaries as "Commencing at a point where Rose Lane meets the railway, thence northwestwards along said railway to Penny Lane, thence northeastwards along said lane to Smithdown Road, thence northwestwards along said road to the eastern boundary of Picton Ward, thence northwards along said boundary to the southern boundary of Old Swan Ward, thence eastwards along said boundary to Mill Lane, thence southwards along said lane to Leverell Road, thence northeastwards along said road to the road known as Northway, thence southwards along said road and the road known as South Way to Thingwall Road, thence generally southwestwards along said road to Childwall Road, thence southeastwards along said road to Beauclair Drive, thence southeastwards along said drive to Dunbabin Road, thence southwestward along said road to Woolton Road, thence southeastwards along said road to Gipsy Lane, thence southwards along said lane to Druids Cross Road, thence southwestwards along said road crossing Menlove Avenue, to Calderstones Road, thence generally westwards and southwestwards along said road and Rose Lane to the point of commencement".

=== 2004 boundaries ===
2004 ward boundaries

A review by the Boundary Committee for England recommended that the council was formed of a reduced number of 90 members elected from 30 wards. The Church ward was changed to encompass parts of the former Grassendale and Allerton wards and losing part to the new Wavertree ward. The ward boundaries followed Penny Lane, Heathfield Road, Woolton Road, Cromptons Lane, Menlove Avenue, Yew Tree Road, Booker Avenue, and the West Coast Main Line

The population of the 2004 ward taken at the 2011 census was 13,974.

=== 2023 boundaries ===
The ward boundary was changed at the 2023 municipal elections taking the southern half of the former Wavertree ward and a small part of the former Church ward. The 2023 ward is represented by one councillor.

The ward boundaries follow Grant Avenue, Prince Alfred Road, Wavertree High Street, Childwall Road, Queens Drive, and Smithdown Road. The ward contains Picton Clock Tower, the Liverpool Blue Coat School and King David High School.

The population of the ward at the 2021 census was 6,795.

== Councillors ==
| Election | Councillor | Councillor | Councillor |
|---|---|---|---|
| 2004 | Colin Eldridge (LD) | Richard Kemp (LD) | Erica Kemp (LD) |
| 2006 | Colin Eldridge (LD) | Richard Kemp (LD) | Erica Kemp (LD) |
| 2007 | Colin Eldridge (LD) | Richard Kemp (LD) | Erica Kemp (LD) |
| 2008 | Colin Eldridge (LD) | Richard Kemp (LD) | Erica Kemp (LD) |
| 2010 | Tom Morrison (LD) | Richard Kemp (LD) | Erica Kemp (LD) |
| 2011 | Tom Morrison (LD) | Richard Kemp (LD) | Erica Kemp (LD) |
| 2012 | Tom Morrison (LD) | Richard Kemp (LD) | Erica Kemp (LD) |
| 2014 | Richard Wenstone (Lab) | Richard Kemp (LD) | Erica Kemp (LD) |
| 2015 | Richard Wenstone (Lab) | Richard Kemp (LD) | Erica Kemp (LD) |
| 2016 | Richard Wenstone (Lab) | Richard Kemp (LD) | Andrew Makinson (LD) |
| 2018 | Liz Makinson (LD) | Richard Kemp (LD) | Andrew Makinson (LD) |
| 2019 | Liz Makinson (LD) | Richard Kemp (LD) | Andrew Makinson (LD) |
| 2021 | Liz Makinson (LD) | Richard Kemp (LD) | Andrew Makinson (LD) |
WARD REFORMED
| 2023 | Carl Cashman (LD) | | |

indicates seat up for re-election after boundary changes.

indicates seat up for re-election.

indicates change in affiliation.

indicates seat up for re-election after casual vacancy.

== Election results ==
=== Elections in the 2020s ===
4th May 2023
| Party | Candidate | Votes | % | ±% |
|---|---|---|---|---|
| **Liberal Democrats** | **Carl Cashman** | **1,165** | **55.45** | |
| Labour | David John Luke Needham | 705 | 33.56 | |
| Green | Stefano Mariani | 202 | 9.61 | |
| Conservative | Lovemore Bhebhe | 29 | 1.38 | |
| Majority | | 460 | 21.89 | |
| Turnout | | 2,101 | 43.02 | |
| Rejected ballots | | 7 | 0.33 | |
| Total ballots | | 2108 | 43.17 | |
| Registered electors | | 4,883 | | |
| Liberal Democrats **win** (new seat) | | | | |

Liverpool City Council Municipal Elections 2021: 6th May 2021
| Party | Candidate | Votes | % | ±% |
|---|---|---|---|---|
| **Liberal Democrats** | **Andrew Makinson** | **3,080** | **59.12** | |
| Labour | Simon James Jones | 1,259 | 24.17 | |
| Green | David Ronald Teasdale | 700 | 13.44 | |
| Conservative | Peter Andrew | 171 | 3.28 | |
| Majority | | 1,821 | 34.95 | |
| Registered electors | | 10,555 | | |
| Turnout | | 5,210 | | |
| Rejected ballots | | 66 | | |
| Liberal Democrats **hold** | | Swing | | |

=== Elections in the 2010s ===
Liverpool City Council Municipal Elections 2019: 2nd May 2019
| Party | Candidate | Votes | % | ±% |
|---|---|---|---|---|
| **Liberal Democrats** | **Richard Kemp** | **2,859** | **60.32%** | **▲2.34** |
| Labour | Nat Griffin | 1,313 | 27.70% | ▼3.88 |
| Green | Julie Elizabeth Birch-Holt | 486 | 10.25% | ▲3.37 |
| Conservative | James Kenton Craig | 82 | 1.73% | ▼1.83 |
| Majority | | 1,546 | 32.62% | ▲6.22 |
| Registered electors | | 10,490 | | |
| Turnout | | 4,770 | 45.47% | ▲1.42 |
| Rejected ballots | | 30 | 0.63% | ▲0.52 |
| Liberal Democrats **hold** | | Swing | 3.11% | |

Liverpool City Council Municipal Elections 2018: 3rd May 2018
| Party | Candidate | Votes | % | ±% |
|---|---|---|---|---|
| Liberal Democrats | **Liz Makinson** | 2,706 | 57.98% | +2.23% |
| Labour | Nigel David James Parsons | 1,474 | 31.58% | +3.91% |
| Green | Julie Elizabeth Birch-Holt | 321 | 6.88% | −1.3% |
| Conservative | Thomas Lewis Burton | 166 | 3.56% | +1.01% |
| Majority | | 1,232 | 26.40% | −1.68% |
| Registered electors | | 10,594 | | |
| Turnout | | 4,667 | 44.05% | −5.57% |
| Rejected ballots | | 5 | 0.11% | Steady |
| Liberal Democrats **gain** from Labour | | Swing | -0.84% | |

Liverpool City Council Municipal Elections 2016: 5th May 2016
| Party | Candidate | Votes | % | ±% |
|---|---|---|---|---|
| Liberal Democrats | **Andrew Kendrick Makinson** | 2,903 | 55.75% | +9.23% |
| Labour | Jan McDermott | 1,441 | 27.67% | −8.45% |
| Green | Eleanor Janet Mary Martin | 426 | 8.18% | −0.49% |
| Liberal | John Bradley | 135 | 2.59% | n/a |
| Conservative | David Jeffery | 133 | 2.55% | −1.88% |
| UKIP | Noah Aubrey Linus Sorensen | 123 | 2.36% | −0.93% |
| TUSC | William Delf | 46 | 0.88% | −0.05% |
| Majority | | 1,462 | 28.08% | +17.68% |
| Registered electors | | 10,593 | | |
| Turnout | | 5,256 | 49.62% | −25.61% |
| Liberal Democrats **hold** | | Swing | 8.84% | |

Liverpool City Council Municipal Elections 2015: 7th May 2015
| Party | Candidate | Votes | % | ±% |
|---|---|---|---|---|
| Liberal Democrats | **Richard Kemp** | 3,808 | 46.52% | +8.19% |
| Labour | Liz Parsons | 2,957 | 36.12% | −4.36% |
| Green | Ted Grant | 710 | 8.67% | −2.42% |
| Conservative | Elizabeth Ann Pearson | 363 | 4.43% | −1.64% |
| UKIP | Christopher Neil Thwaite | 272 | 3.32% | n/a |
| TUSC | Jack Robert Yarlett | 76 | 0.93% | n/a |
| Majority | | 851 | 10.40% | +12.55% |
| Registered electors | | 10,903 | | |
| Turnout | | 8,202 | 75.23% | +31.37% |
| Liberal Democrats **hold** | | Swing | 6.28% | |

Liverpool City Council Municipal Elections 2014: 22nd May 2014
| Party | Candidate | Votes | % | ±% |
|---|---|---|---|---|
| Labour | **Dr Richard Wenstone** | 1,906 | 40.48% | +4.42% |
| Liberal Democrats | Andrew Makinson | 1805 | 38.33% | −10.38% |
| Green | Eleanor Janet Mary Martin | 522 | 11.09% | +3.69% |
| Liberal | John Bradley | 190 | 4.03% | n/a |
| Conservative | James Pearson | 286 | 6.07% | +1.71% |
| Majority | | 101 | 2.15% | −10.50% |
| Turnout | | 4,709 | 43.86% | −0.26% |
| Labour **gain** from Liberal Democrats | | Swing | +7.40% | |

Liverpool City Council Municipal Elections 2012: 3rd May 2012
| Party | Candidate | Votes | % | ±% |
|---|---|---|---|---|
| Liberal Democrats | **Erica Kemp** | **2291** | **48.71%** | +6.8% |
| Labour | Richard Wenstone | 1696 | 36.06% | −1.06% |
| Green | Eleanor Janet Mary Martin | 348 | 7.40% | −3.64% |
| Conservative | Christopher Matthew Hall | 205 | 4.36% | −5.68% |
| UKIP | Tony Hammond | 163 | 3.47% | n/a |
| Majority | | 595 | 12.65% | +7.86% |
| Turnout | | 4703 | 44.12% | −2.8% |
| Liberal Democrats **hold** | | Swing | +3.93% | |

Liverpool City Council Municipal Elections 2011: 5th May 2011
| Party | Candidate | Votes | % | ±% |
|---|---|---|---|---|
| Liberal Democrats | **Richard Kemp** | **2091** | **41.91%** | −3.07% |
| Labour | Nathalie Nicholas | 1852 | 37.12% | +7.77% |
| Conservative | Tom Roberts | 501 | 10.04% | +0.11% |
| Green | Eleanor Janet Mary Martin | 399 | 8.00% | +2.88% |
| Independent | Jeff Berman | 146 | 2.93% | +0.78% |
| Majority | | 239 | 4.79% | −10.85% |
| Turnout | | 4989 | 46.92 | −18.30% |
| Liberal Democrats **hold** | | Swing | -5.42% | |

Liverpool City Council Municipal Elections 2010: Church
| Party | Candidate | Votes | % | ±% |
|---|---|---|---|---|
| Liberal Democrats | **Thomas William Morrison** | **3179** | **44.98%** | |
| Labour | Peter Clarke | 2074 | 29.35% | |
| Conservative | James Barnaby | 702 | 9.93% | |
| Liberal | James Robert MacGregor | 556 | 7.87% | |
| Green | Eleanor Janet Mary Martin | 404 | 5.72% | |
| Independent | Jeffrey Berman | 152 | 2.15% | |
| Majority | | 1105 | 15.64% | |
| Turnout | | 7067 | 65.22% | |
| Liberal Democrats **hold** | | Swing | | |

=== Elections in the 2000s ===
Liverpool City Council Municipal Elections 2008: Church
| Party | Candidate | Votes | % | ±% |
|---|---|---|---|---|
| Liberal Democrats | **Erica Kemp** | **2330** | **60.19%** | |
| Labour | David Shepherd | 522 | 13.48% | |
| Conservative | Norman Coppell | 360 | 9.30% | |
| Green | Eleanor Janet Mary Martin | 286 | 7.39% | |
| Independent | Jeffrey Berman | 273 | 7.05% | |
| Liberal | James Robert MacGregor | 100 | 2.58% | |
| Majority | | | | |
| Turnout | | 3871 | 36.18% | |
| Liberal Democrats **hold** | | Swing | | |

Liverpool City Council Municipal Elections 2007: Church
| Party | Candidate | Votes | % | ±% |
|---|---|---|---|---|
| Liberal Democrats | **Richard Kemp** | **2790** | **69.77%** | |
| Labour | Stephen Laurence Bennett | 461 | 11.53% | |
| Conservative | Graham Kenneth Jones | 332 | 8.30% | |
| Green | Eleanor Janet Mary Martin | 329 | 8.23% | |
| Liberal | James Robert MacGregor | 87 | 2.18% | |
| Majority | | | | |
| Turnout | | 3999 | 37.30% | |
| Liberal Democrats **hold** | | Swing | | |

Liverpool City Council Municipal Elections 2006: Church
| Party | Candidate | Votes | % | ±% |
|---|---|---|---|---|
| Liberal Democrats | **Colin Eldridge** | **2306** | **60.22%** | |
| Labour | Timothy Martin Beaumont | 501 | 13.08% | |
| Green | Eleanor Janet Mary Martin | 335 | 8.75% | |
| Conservative | Graham Kenneth Jones | 291 | 7.60% | |
| Independent | Jeffrey Berman | 274 | 7.16% | |
| Liberal | James Robert MacGregor | 122 | 3.19% | |
| Majority | | | | |
| Turnout | | 3829 | 34.35% | |
| Liberal Democrats **hold** | | Swing | | |

After the boundary change of 2004 the whole of Liverpool City Council faced election. Three Councillors were returned.

Liverpool City Council Municipal Elections 2004: Church
| Party | Candidate | Votes | % | ±% |
|---|---|---|---|---|
| Liberal Democrats | **Erica Kemp** | **3870** | | |
| Liberal Democrats | **Richard Kemp** | **3771** | | |
| Liberal Democrats | **Colin Eldridge** | **3465** | | |
| Green | Eleanor Martin | 736 | | |
| Labour | Wendy Simon | 733 | | |
| Labour | Neville Jones | 601 | | |
| Labour | David Holt | 531 | | |
| Majority | | | | |
| Turnout | | 5060 | 44.91% | |
| Liberal Democrats **hold** | | Swing | n/a | |

∗ italics denotes the sitting Councillor. * bold denotes the winning candidate.
