= 2016 Knowsley Metropolitan Borough Council election =

2016 local election in England

The 2016 Knowsley Metropolitan Borough Council election took place on 5 May 2016 to elect members of the Knowsley Metropolitan Borough Council in England. Following a boundary review, the number of seats was reduced from 63 to 45, with all of these new seats being up for election at the same time. This was held on the same day as other local elections.

After the election, the composition of the council was:

Party	Seats	±
Labour	42	▼21
Liberal Democrats	3	▲3

== Election results ==
=== Overall election result ===
Overall result compared with 2015.

Number of seats reduced by 18.

Knowsley Metropolitan Borough Council Election Results, 2016
Party	Candidates					Votes		
Party	Stood	Elected	Net	Net %	% of total	%	№	Net %
Labour	45	42	▼21	▼6.7	93.3	60.6	18,445	▼14.5
Liberal Democrat	9	3	▲3	▲6.7	6.7	7.2	2,201	▲3.8
Independent	5	0	Steady	Steady	0.0	7.1	2,153	▲5.8
Conservative	10	0	Steady	Steady	0.0	6.8	2,069	▲1.2
First For Kirby	3	0	Steady	Steady	0.0	6.4	1,935	▲0.2
Green	4	0	Steady	Steady	0.0	4.6	1,386	▲2.4
UKIP	7	0	Steady	Steady	0.0	4.1	1,258	▼0.2
TUSC	5	0	Steady	Steady	0.0	3.3	990	▲1.7

=== Changes in council composition ===
Prior to the election the composition of the council was:

↓
63
Labour

After the election, the composition of the council was:

↓
42	3
Labour	Liberal Democrat

== Ward results ==
=== Cherryfield ===
Cherryfield
Party	Candidate	Votes	%	±%
Labour	Jackie Harris	1244	28.6	N/A
Labour	Jayne Elizabeth Aston	1242	28.5	N/A
Labour	David Mark Lonergan	1110	25.5	N/A
First For Kirby	Jenny Bamber	638	14.6	N/A
Conservative	Adam William Butler	123	2.8	N/A
Majority		606	14.0	N/A
Labour win (new seat)				
Labour win (new seat)				
Labour win (new seat)				

=== Halewood North ===
Halewood North
Party	Candidate	Votes	%	±%
Labour	Alan John Flute	1319	27.4	N/A
Labour	Shelley Powell	1312	27.3	N/A
Labour	Terry Powell	1231	25.6	N/A
Green	Phil Williamson	353	7.3	N/A
Independent	Bob Swann	320	6.7	N/A
Conservative	Matthew Paul Smith	274	5.7	N/A
Majority		966	20.1	N/A
Labour win (new seat)				
Labour win (new seat)				
Labour win (new seat)				

=== Halewood South ===
Halewood South
Party	Candidate	Votes	%	±%
Labour	Edna Finneran	1339	23.4	N/A
Labour	Tina Harris	1333	23.3	N/A
Labour	Gary Eric See	1191	20.8	N/A
Independent	Allan Harvey	558	9.7	N/A
TUSC	Bren Tyrrell	442	7.7	N/A
TUSC	Paula Marjorie Thomas	324	5.7	N/A
TUSC	Andy Tomo	330	5.8	N/A
Conservative	Graham Tubey	215	3.8	N/A
Majority		781	13.7	N/A
Labour win (new seat)				
Labour win (new seat)				
Labour win (new seat)				

=== Northwood ===
Northwood
Party	Candidate	Votes	%	±%
Labour	Eddie Connor	1189	32.3	N/A
Labour	Marie Ellen Stuart	1103	30.0	N/A
Labour	Mike Murphy	779	21.2	N/A
First For Kirby	Philip McKuhen	606	16.5	N/A
Majority		583	15.8	N/A
Labour win (new seat)				
Labour win (new seat)				
Labour win (new seat)				

=== Page Moss ===
Page Moss
Party	Candidate	Votes	%	±%
Labour Co-op	Ken McGlashan	1208	32.1	N/A
Labour Co-op	Veronica McNeill	1123	29.8	N/A
Labour Co-op	Andy Moorhead	1051	27.9	N/A
Green	Kirk Anthony Sandringham	385	10.2	N/A
Majority		823	21.8	N/A
Labour Co-op win (new seat)				
Labour Co-op win (new seat)				
Labour Co-op win (new seat)				

=== Prescot North ===
Prescot North
Party	Candidate	Votes	%	±%
Liberal Democrats	Carl Cashman	1254	19.9	N/A
Liberal Democrats	Ian Smith	1196	19.0	N/A
Liberal Democrats	Mike Wynn	1105	17.5	N/A
Labour	Lynn O'Keeffe	839	13.3	N/A
Labour	Mike Kearns	816	12.9	N/A
Labour	Bill Weightman	702	11.1	N/A
TUSC	Steve Whatham	222	3.5	N/A
Conservative	Robert Peter Allan Avery	170	2.7	N/A
Majority		416	6.6	N/A
Liberal Democrats win (new seat)				
Liberal Democrats win (new seat)				
Liberal Democrats win (new seat)				

=== Prescot South ===
Prescot South
Party	Candidate	Votes	%	±%
Labour	Steff O'Keeffe	1151	23.3	N/A
Labour	Denise Allen	1131	22.9	N/A
Labour	Dave Williams	1101	22.3	N/A
Liberal Democrats	Paul Terence Shaw	503	10.2	N/A
Liberal Democrats	Sophia April Smith	503	10.2	N/A
Liberal Democrats	John Loftus Wickham	338	7.8	N/A
Conservative	Sheila Mary Webster	171	3.5	N/A
Majority		648	13.1	N/A
Labour win (new seat)				
Labour win (new seat)				
Labour win (new seat)				

=== Roby ===
Roby
Party	Candidate	Votes	%	±%
Labour	Maggie Harvey	1364	22.3	N/A
Labour	Pam Spall	1316	21.6	N/A
Labour	Sarah Joanne Spall	1207	19.8	N/A
UKIP	Ray Cleary	507	7.1	N/A
UKIP	Gary John Robertson	436	5.9	N/A
Conservative	Tyrone Noon	359	5.9	N/A
UKIP	Sam Robertson	359	5.6	N/A
Green	Martin Peter Mackarel	343	5.6	N/A
Independent	Johnny Webster	212	3.5	N/A
Majority		857	14.0	N/A
Labour win (new seat)				
Labour win (new seat)				
Labour win (new seat)				

=== Shevington ===
Shevington
Party	Candidate	Votes	%	±%
Labour	Linda Mooney	1060	30.4	N/A
Labour	Tony Brennan	1055	30.2	N/A
Labour	Ray Halpin	1047	30.0	N/A
TUSC	Neill Thomas John Dunne	326	9.3	N/A
Majority		734	21.1	N/A
Labour win (new seat)				
Labour win (new seat)				
Labour win (new seat)				

=== St Gabriel's ===
St Gabriel's
Party	Candidate	Votes	%	±%
Labour	Frank Walsh	1260	25.6	N/A
Labour	Brian Michael O'Hare	1207	24.5	N/A
Labour	Christina Maria O'Hare	1101	22.4	N/A
UKIP	Fred Fricker	472	9.6	N/A
UKIP	Sharon Marie Fricker	401	8.2	N/A
UKIP	Neil Lawrence Miney	354	7.2	N/A
Conservative	Tony Read	122	2.5	N/A
Majority		788	16.0	N/A
Labour win (new seat)				
Labour win (new seat)				
Labour win (new seat)				

=== St Michael's ===
St Michael's
Party	Candidate	Votes	%	±%
Labour	Joan Elizabeth Lilly	1200	30.3	N/A
Labour	Vickie Lamb	1185	30.0	N/A
Labour	Kay Moorhead	1156	29.2	N/A
UKIP	John David Price	279	7.1	N/A
Conservative	Ron Ford	134	3.4	N/A
Majority		921	23.2	N/A
Labour win (new seat)				
Labour win (new seat)				
Labour win (new seat)				

=== Stockbridge ===
Stockbridge
Party	Candidate	Votes	%	±%
Labour	Margi O'Mara	1069	30.5	N/A
Labour	John Jason Donnelly	1017	29.0	N/A
Labour	Dennis John Baum	986	28.1	N/A
Independent	Paul Gary Woods	437	12.5	N/A
Majority		632	18.0	N/A
Labour win (new seat)				
Labour win (new seat)				
Labour win (new seat)				

=== Swanside ===
Swanside
Party	Candidate	Votes	%	±%
Labour	Graham James Morgan	1681	31.9	N/A
Labour	Chris Bannon	1606	30.5	N/A
Labour	Colin Dever	1444	27.4	N/A
Green	Paul Kenneth Robert Marshall	305	5.8	N/A
Conservative	Ray Newland	230	4.4	N/A
Majority		1376	26.1	N/A
Labour win (new seat)				
Labour win (new seat)				
Labour win (new seat)				

=== Whiston and Cronton ===
Whiston and Cronton
Party	Candidate	Votes	%	±%
Labour	Terry Byron	1433	26.3	N/A
Labour	Tony Newman	1343	24.7	N/A
Labour	Gillian Flatley	1303	23.9	N/A
Liberal Democrats	Dave O'Hara	444	8.1	N/A
Liberal Democrats	Samantha Clare Smith	343	6.3	N/A
Liberal Democrats	Marjorie Elizabeth Sommerfield	311	5.7	N/A
Conservative	Carl Robert Cross	271	5.0	N/A
Majority		989	18.2	N/A
Labour win (new seat)				
Labour win (new seat)				
Labour win (new seat)				

=== Whitfield ===
Whitefield
Party	Candidate	Votes	%	±%
Labour	Sean Phillip Donnelly	1089	25.0	N/A
Labour	Norman Frederick Keats	1063	24.4	N/A
Labour	Ros Smith	886	20.3	N/A
First For Kirby	Geraldine Veronica Robertson	691	15.9	N/A
Independent	Brian Johns	626	14.4	N/A
Majority		398	9.1	N/A
Labour win (new seat)				
Labour win (new seat)				
Labour win (new seat)				

== Changes between 2016 and 2018 ==
=== St Michael's by-election July 2017 ===
St Michael's by-election: 20th July 2017
Party	Candidate	Votes	%	±%
Labour	Mike Kearns	716	86.6	▼3.0
Liberal Democrats	Dean Boyle	58	7.0	New
Green	Kirk Anthony Sandringham	53	6.4	New
Majority		658	79.6	▼2.9
Labour hold		Swing	▼1.5	

=== Page Moss by-election March 2018 ===
Page Moss by-election: 29th March 2018
Party	Candidate	Votes	%	±%
Labour	Del Arnall	657	78.2	▼11.6
Green	Kirk Sandringham	74	8.8	▼1.4
UKIP	Fred Fricker	68	8.1	New
Conservative	Aaron Waters	41	4.9	New
Majority		583	69.4	▼10.2
Labour hold		Swing	▼5.1	
