= Prescot South (ward) =

Coordinates: 53.357°N 2.876°W

Prescot South is a Knowsley Metropolitan Borough Council Ward. The ward was created for the 2016 municipal election when the number of councillors on Knowsley Metropolitan Borough Council was reduced from 63 to 45.

The ward is in the St Helens South and Whiston constituency.

== Councillors ==
Term	Councillor	Party
2016–2018	David Williams	Labour
2016–present	Denise Allen	Labour
2016–present	Steff O'Keeffe	Labour
2018–present	Kai Taylor	Green

== Election results ==
=== Elections of the 2010s ===
==== May 2019 ====
Candidates so far declared:

Knowsley Metropolitan Borough Council election, 2 May 2019: Prescot South
Party	Candidate	Votes	%	±%
Green	Joanne Burke			

==== May 2018 ====
Knowsley Metropolitan Borough Council election, 3 May 2018: Prescot South
Party	Candidate	Votes	%	±%
Green	Kai Taylor	1,520	65.5	New
Labour	Lynn O’Keeffe	736	31.7	▼31.4
Conservative	Sheila Webster	64	2.8	▼6.6
Majority		784	33.8	N/A
Turnout		2,322	32.8	
Green gain from Labour		Swing	▲34.7	

==== May 2016 ====
Knowsley Metropolitan Borough Council election, 5 May 2016: Prescot South
Party	Candidate	Votes	%	±%
Labour	Steff O'Keeffe	1,151	63.1	N/A
Labour	Denise Allen	1,131	–	–
Labour	David Williams	1,101	–	–
Liberal Democrats	Sophia Smith	503	27.6	N/A
Liberal Democrats	Paul Shaw	502	–	–
Liberal Democrats	John Wickham	338	–	–
Conservative	Sheila Webster	171	9.4	N/A
Majority		648	35.5	N/A
Registered electors		6,960		
Rejected ballots		9		N/A
Labour win (new seat)				
Labour win (new seat)				
Labour win (new seat)				

== Notes ==
• italics denotes the sitting councillor • bold denotes the winning candidate
