= 2021 Knowsley Metropolitan Borough Council election =

2021 local election in Knowsley

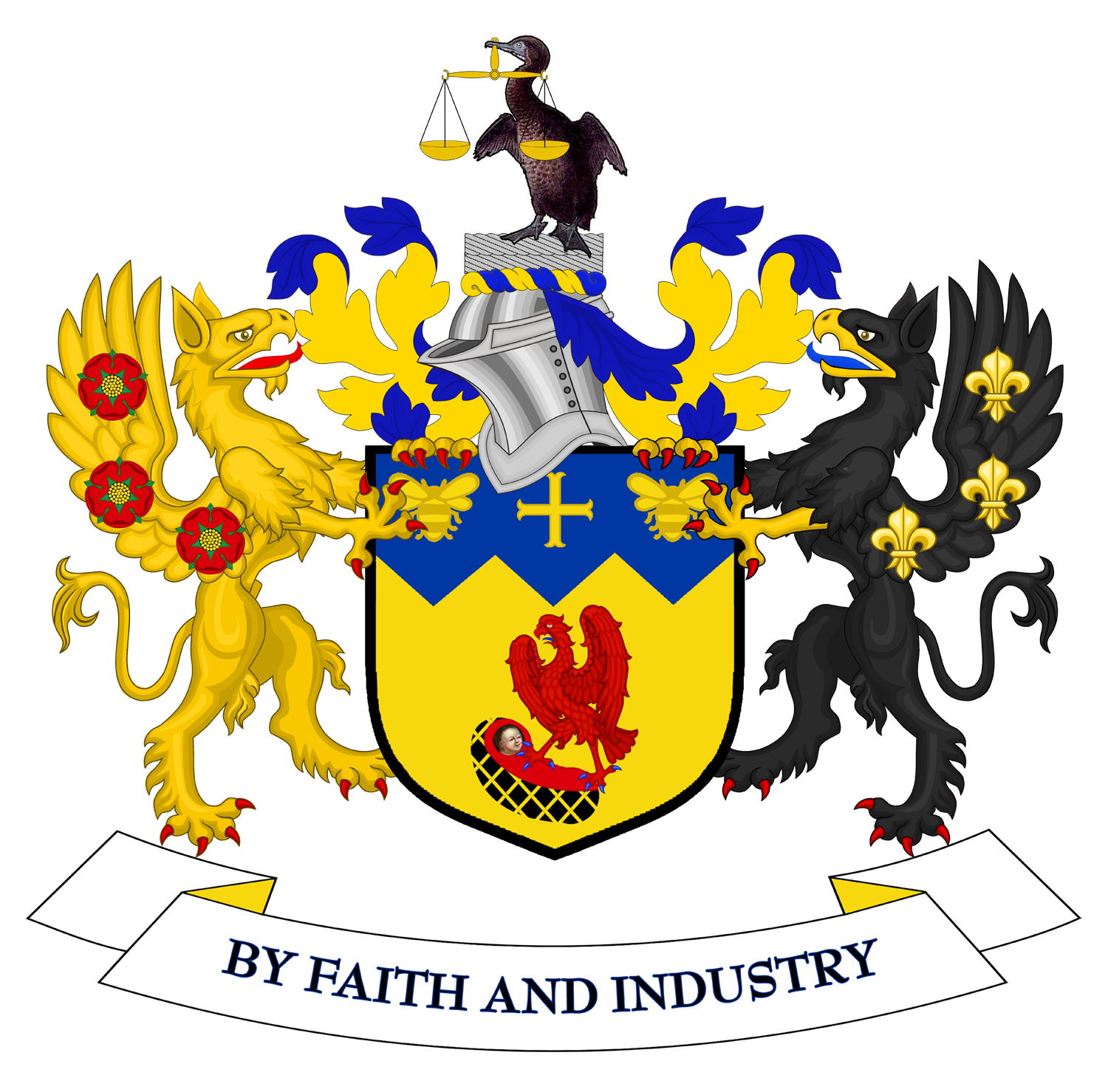

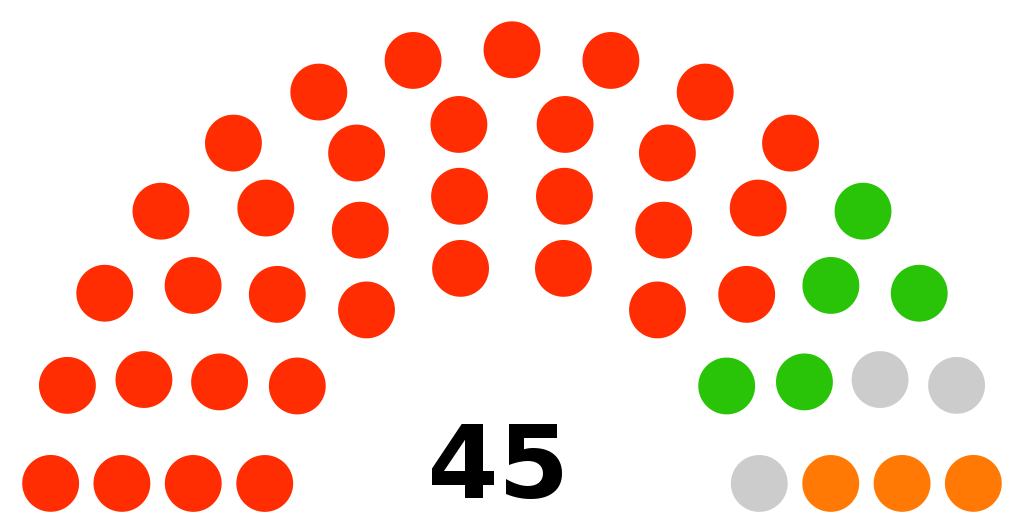
- 6 May 2021 Knowsley Metropolitan Borough Council Composition 2021

Map of the results

The 2021 Knowsley Metropolitan Borough Council election took place on 6 May 2021 to elect members of Knowsley Metropolitan Borough Council in England. This was on the same day as other local elections. One-third of the seats were up for election.

== Results summary ==
2021 Knowsley Metropolitan Borough Council
| Party | This election | | | | Full council | | | This election | | |
| Party | Candidates | Seats | Net | Seats % | Other | Total | Total % | Votes | Votes % | +/− |
|---|---|---|---|---|---|---|---|---|---|---|
| Labour | {{{candidates}}} | 12 | ▼3 | 70.6 | 22 | 34 | 75.6 | 17,578 | 55.3 | -3.1 |
| Green | {{{candidates}}} | 2 | ▲2 | 11.8 | 3 | 5 | 11.1 | 7,359 | 23.1 | +2.2 |
| Independent | {{{candidates}}} | 2 | ▲1 | 11.8 | 1 | 3 | 6.7 | 3,120 | 9.8 | +2.3 |
| Liberal Democrats | {{{candidates}}} | 1 | Steady | 5.9 | 2 | 3 | 6.7 | 1,875 | 5.9 | +0.1 |
| Conservative | {{{candidates}}} | 0 | Steady | 0.0 | 0 | 0 | 0.0 | 1,289 | 4.1 | -2.4 |
| TUSC | {{{candidates}}} | 0 | Steady | 0.0 | 0 | 0 | 0.0 | 379 | 1.2 | New |
| For Britain | {{{candidates}}} | 0 | Steady | 0.0 | 0 | 0 | 0.0 | 73 | 0.2 | New |
| Workers Party | {{{candidates}}} | 0 | Steady | 0.0 | 0 | 0 | 0.0 | 65 | 0.2 | New |
| SDP | {{{candidates}}} | 0 | Steady | 0.0 | 0 | 0 | 0.0 | 61 | 0.2 | New |

== Ward results ==
=== Cherryfield ===
Cherryfield
| Party | Candidate | Votes | % | ±% |
|---|---|---|---|---|
| Labour | Jackie Harris | 1,271 | 76.7 | |
| Green | Michael Dooley | 386 | 23.3 | |
| Majority | | 885 | 53.4 | |
| Labour hold | | Swing | | |

=== Halewood North ===
Halewood North
| Party | Candidate | Votes | % | ±% |
|---|---|---|---|---|
| Labour | Alan Flute | 1,058 | 50.8 | |
| Independent | Suzanne Harvey | 437 | 21.0 | |
| Conservative | Jack Boyd | 254 | 12.2 | |
| Green | Thomas Large | 232 | 11.1 | |
| Liberal Democrats | Marjorie Sommerfield | 101 | 4.9 | |
| Majority | | 621 | 29.8 | |
| Labour hold | | Swing | | |

=== Halewood South ===
Halewood South
| Party | Candidate | Votes | % | ±% |
|---|---|---|---|---|
| Labour | Edna Finneran | 987 | 46.3 | |
| Independent | Joanne Harvey | 879 | 41.2 | |
| Labour | Iain Hamilton | 848 | 39.8 | |
| Independent | Vicky Berry | 793 | 37.2 | |
| Conservative | Graham Tubey | 218 | 10.2 | |
| Workers Party | Clare Stranack | 65 | 3.0 | |
| Majority | | | | |
| Labour hold | | Swing | | |
| Independent hold | | Swing | | |

=== Northwood ===
Northwood
| Party | Candidate | Votes | % | ±% |
|---|---|---|---|---|
| Labour | Eddie Connor | 1,278 | 78.0 | |
| TUSC | Les Connor | 238 | 14.5 | |
| Liberal Democrats | Les Rigby | 122 | 7.4 | |
| Majority | | 1,040 | | |
| Labour hold | | Swing | | |

=== Page Moss ===
Page Moss
| Party | Candidate | Votes | % | ±% |
|---|---|---|---|---|
| Labour | Ken McGlashan | 1,000 | 58.1 | |
| Green | John Carine | 609 | 35.4 | |
| Conservative | Ken Wilson | 111 | 6.5 | |
| Majority | | 391 | | |
| Labour hold | | Swing | | |

=== Prescot North ===
Prescot North
| Party | Candidate | Votes | % | ±% |
|---|---|---|---|---|
| Liberal Democrats | Carl Cashman | 1,448 | 60.8 | |
| Labour | Tony Ely | 763 | 32.0 | |
| Conservative | Aaron Waters | 171 | 7.2 | |
| Majority | | 685 | | |
| Liberal Democrats hold | | Swing | | |

=== Prescot South ===
Prescot South
| Party | Candidate | Votes | % | ±% |
|---|---|---|---|---|
| Green | Pat Cook | 1,182 | 61.1 | |
| Labour | Denise Allen | 751 | 38.9 | |
| Majority | | 431 | | |
| Green gain from Labour | | Swing | | |

=== Roby ===
Roby
| Party | Candidate | Votes | % | ±% |
|---|---|---|---|---|
| Labour | Margaret Harvey | 1,188 | 47.4 | |
| Green | Kirk Sandringham | 1,028 | 41.0 | |
| Conservative | Gary Robertson | 291 | 11.6 | |
| Majority | | 160 | | |
| Labour hold | | Swing | | |

=== Shevington ===
Shevington
| Party | Candidate | Votes | % | ±% |
|---|---|---|---|---|
| Labour | Aimee Wright | 1,224 | 76.7 | |
| TUSC | Neill Dunne | 141 | 8.8 | |
| Conservative | Julie Ranson | 120 | 7.5 | |
| Green | Graham Golding | 110 | 6.9 | |
| Majority | | 1,083 | | |
| Labour hold | | Swing | | |

=== St Gabriels ===
St Gabriels
| Party | Candidate | Votes | % | ±% |
|---|---|---|---|---|
| Labour | Frank Walsh | 804 | 44.5 | |
| Green | Cath Golding | 793 | 43.9 | |
| Labour | Steff O'Keeffee | 790 | 43.7 | |
| Green | Julie Parker | 582 | 32.2 | |
| SDP | Patricia Jameson | 61 | 3.4 | |
| Majority | | | | |
| Labour hold | | Swing | | |
| Green gain from Labour | | Swing | | |

=== St Michaels ===
St Michaels
| Party | Candidate | Votes | % | ±% |
|---|---|---|---|---|
| Labour | Joan Lilly | 1,174 | 75.8 | |
| Green | Graham Wickens | 233 | 15.1 | |
| Liberal Democrats | Dean Boyle | 141 | 9.1 | |
| Majority | | 941 | | |
| Labour hold | | Swing | | |

=== Stockbridge ===
Stockbridge
| Party | Candidate | Votes | % | ±% |
|---|---|---|---|---|
| Labour | Lynn O'Keeffe | 1,049 | 77.9 | |
| Green | Paul Ryan | 297 | 22.1 | |
| Majority | | 752 | | |
| Labour hold | | Swing | | |

=== Swanside ===
Swanside
| Party | Candidate | Votes | % | ±% |
|---|---|---|---|---|
| Labour | Graham Morgan | 1,452 | 60.1 | |
| Green | Paul Woodruff | 962 | 39.9 | |
| Majority | | 490 | | |
| Labour hold | | Swing | | |

=== Whiston and Cronton ===
Whiston and Cronton
| Party | Candidate | Votes | % | ±% |
|---|---|---|---|---|
| Labour | Terry Byron | 966 | 44.8 | |
| Green | Sandra Gaffney | 945 | 43.9 | |
| Conservative | Gary McCormick | 244 | 11.3 | |
| Majority | | 21 | | |
| Labour hold | | Swing | | |

=== Whitefield ===
Whitefield
| Party | Candidate | Votes | % | ±% |
|---|---|---|---|---|
| Independent | Steve Smith | 1,011 | 47.6 | |
| Labour | Sean Donnelly | 975 | 45.9 | |
| For Britain | Christine Dillon | 73 | 3.4 | |
| Liberal Democrats | Chris Krelle | 63 | 3.0 | |
| Majority | | 36 | | |
| Independent gain from Labour | | Swing | | |
