= Prescot North (ward) =

- Metropolitan Borough ward for Knowsley Metropolitan Borough Council
- County: Merseyside
- Population: 9,519 (2016)
- Registered electors: 7,365 (2016)
- Settlements: Prescot (part)

Current ward
- Created: 2016
- First Round Councillor: Frances Wynn (Liberal Democrat)
- Second Round Councillor: Ian Smith (Liberal Democrat)
- Third Round Councillor: Carl Cashman (Liberal Democrat)
- Number of Councillors: Three
- Created from: Prescot West

Overlaps
- UK Parliament constituency: Knowsley (part); St Helens South and Whiston (part)

Prescot North is a Knowsley Metropolitan Borough Council Ward. The ward was created for the 2016 municipal election when the number of councillors on Knowsley Metropolitan Borough Council was reduced from 63 to 45.

The ward covers both parts of the Knowsley constituency and the neighbouring St Helens South and Whiston constituency.

== Councillors ==
=== Election Timeline ===
Election	Councillor	Councillor	Councillor
2016	Mike Wynn (LD)	Ian Smith (LD)	Carl Cashman (LD)
2018	Frances Wynn (LD)	Ian Smith (LD)	Carl Cashman (LD)

indicates seat up for re-election.

=== Councillor Details ===
Term	Councillor	Party	Notes
2016–2018	Mike Wynn	Liberal Democrat	
2016–present	Ian Smith	Liberal Democrat	
2016–present	Carl Cashman	Liberal Democrat	Leader of the Liberal Democrat group, 2016 to present
2018–present	Frances Wynn	Liberal Democrat	

== Election results ==
=== Elections of the 2010s ===
==== 2018 ====
Knowsley Metropolitan Borough Council election, 3 May 2018: Prescot North
Party	Candidate	Votes	%	±%
Liberal Democrats	Frances Wynn	1,373	60.3	▲9.8
Labour	Tony Ely	781	34.3	▲0.5
Conservative	Aaron Waters	124	5.4	▼1.4
Majority		592	26.0	▲9.3
Turnout			30.1	
Liberal Democrats hold		Swing	▲3.5	

==== 2016 ====
Knowsley Metropolitan Borough Council election, 5th May 2016: Prescot North
Party	Candidate	Votes	%
Liberal Democrats	Carl Cashman	1,254	50.5
Liberal Democrats	Ian Smith	1,196	–
Liberal Democrats	Mike Wynn	1,105	–
Labour	Lynn O'Keeffe	839	33.8
Labour	Mike Kearns	816	–
Labour	Bill Weightman	702	–
TUSC	Steve Whatham	222	8.9
Conservative	Robert Avery	170	6.8
Majority		415	16.7
Registered electors		7,365	
Liberal Democrats win (new seat)			
Liberal Democrats win (new seat)			
Liberal Democrats win (new seat)			

== Notes ==
• italics denotes the sitting councillor • bold denotes the winning candidate
