= Knowsley Council =

Local government body in England

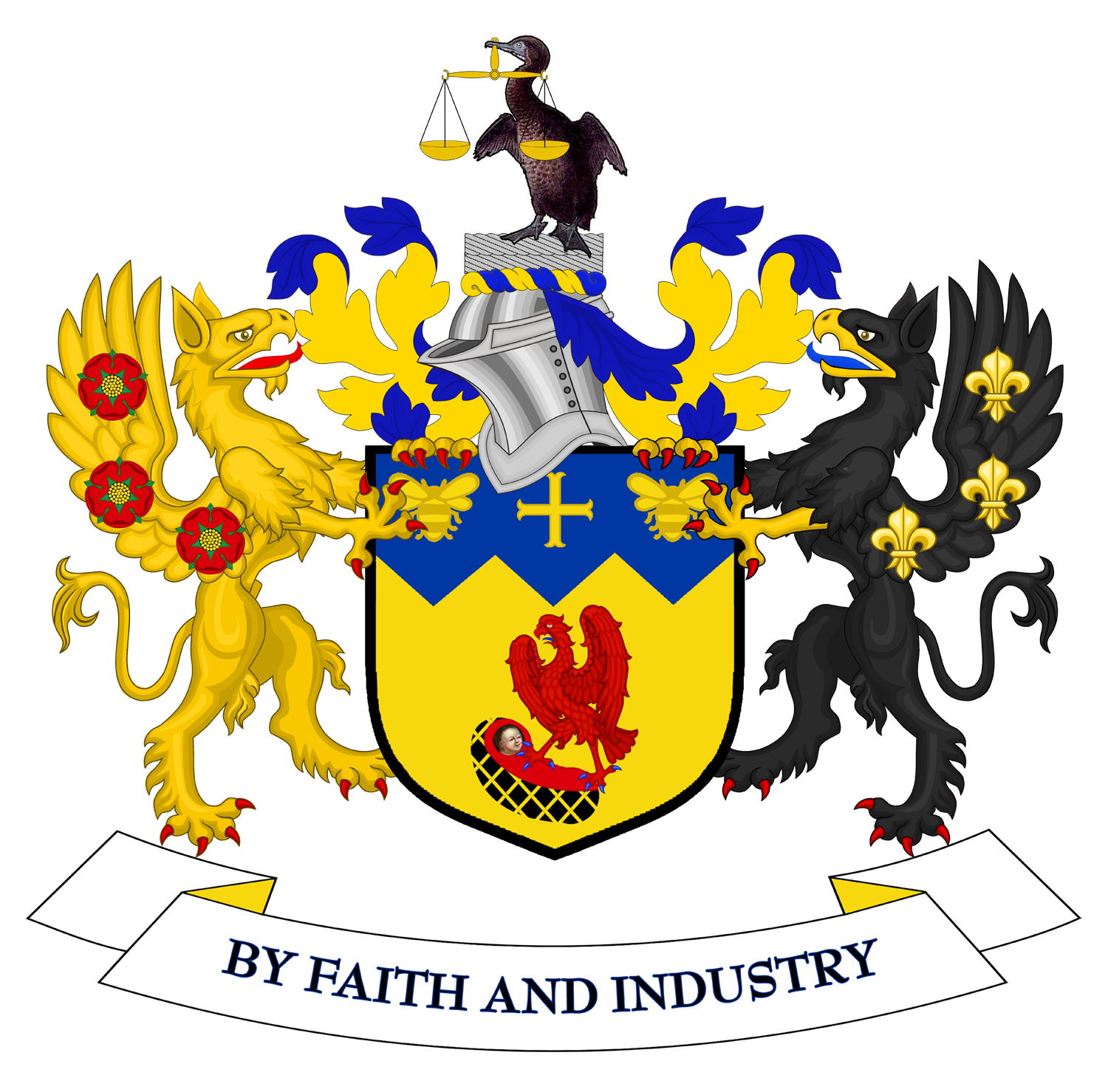

Type
- Type: Metropolitan borough council

Leadership
- Mayor: Edna Finneran, Labour since 22 May 2026
- Leader: Graham Morgan, Labour since 18 May 2018
- Chief Executive: James Duncan since 1 February 2025

Structure
- Seats: 45 councillors
- Graph of the party split among 45 seats.
- Political groups: Administration (24) Labour (24) Other parties (21) Green (8) Reform (4) Liberal Democrats (3) Independent (6)
- Joint committees: Liverpool City Region Combined Authority
- Length of term: 4 years

Elections
- Voting system: First-past-the-post
- Last election: 7 May 2026
- Next election: 6 May 2027

Meeting place
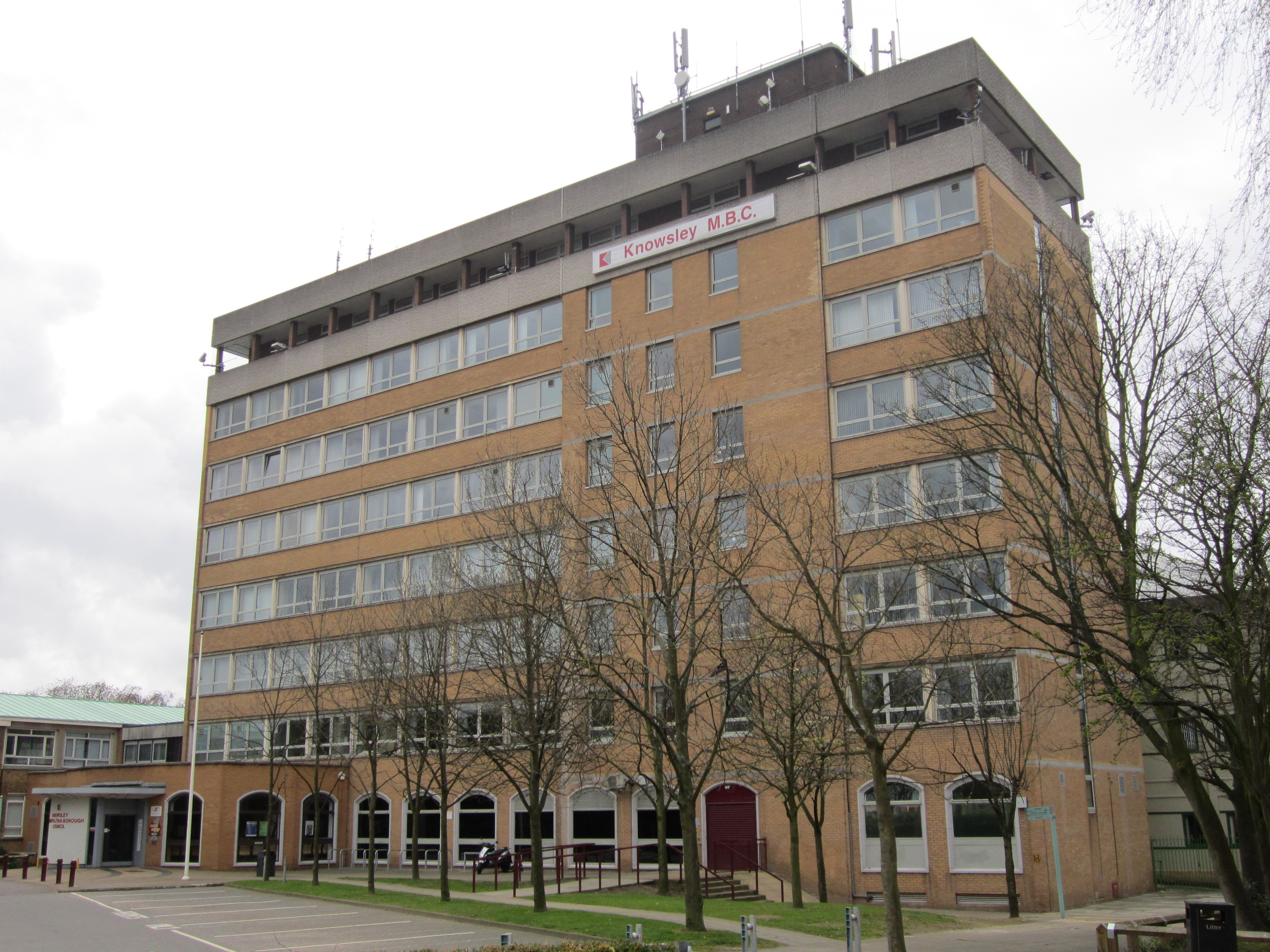
- Municipal Buildings, Archway Road, Huyton, Liverpool, L36 9UX

Website
- knowsley.gov.uk

Knowsley Council, or Knowsley Metropolitan Borough Council, is the local authority of the Metropolitan Borough of Knowsley in Merseyside, England. It is a metropolitan borough council and provides the majority of local government services in the borough. The council has been a member of the Liverpool City Region Combined Authority since 2014.

The council has been under Labour majority control since its creation in 1974. It is based at the Municipal Buildings in Huyton.

== History ==
The metropolitan borough of Knowsley and its council were created in 1974 under the Local Government Act 1972, covering the whole area of three former districts and parts of another two, all of which were abolished at the same time:

- Huyton-with-Roby Urban District
- Kirkby Urban District
- Prescot Urban District
- West Lancashire Rural District (parish of Simonswood only) (Note: Simonswood was subsequently transferred back to Lancashire in 1994.)
- Whiston Rural District (parishes of Cronton, Halewood, Knowsley, Tarbock and Whiston only)

The area was transferred from Lancashire to become one of the five districts in the new metropolitan county of Merseyside. The first election to the new council was held in 1973. For its first year the council acted as a shadow authority alongside the area's outgoing authorities. The new metropolitan district and its council formally came into being on 1 April 1974, at which point the old districts and their councils were abolished.

The metropolitan district was awarded borough status from its creation, allowing the chair of the council to take the title of mayor. The council styles itself Knowsley Council rather than its full formal name of Knowsley Metropolitan Borough Council.

From 1974 until 1986 the council was a lower-tier authority, with upper-tier functions provided by Merseyside County Council. The county council was abolished in 1986 and its functions passed to Merseyside's five borough councils, including Knowsley, with some services provided through joint committees.

Since 2014 the council has been a member of the Liverpool City Region Combined Authority, which has been led by the directly elected Mayor of the Liverpool City Region since 2017. The combined authority provides strategic leadership and co-ordination for certain functions across the region, but Knowsley Council continues to be responsible for most local government functions.

== Governance ==
Knowsley Council provides metropolitan borough services. Some strategic functions in the area are provided by the Liverpool City Region Combined Authority; the leader of Knowsley Council sits on the combined authority as Knowsley's representative. Parts of the borough are covered by civil parishes, which form an additional tier of local government for their areas.

=== Political control ===
The first election to the council was held in 1973. It initially acted as a shadow authority alongside the outgoing authorities until the new arrangements formally came into effect on 1 April 1974. The council has been under Labour majority control since 1974.

Party in control	Years
Labour	1974–present

=== Leadership ===
The role of mayor is largely ceremonial in Knowsley. Political leadership is instead provided by the leader of the council. The first leader, Dave Tempest, was formerly leader of Kirkby Urban District Council, one of Knowsley's predecessors. The leaders of Knowsley Council since 1974 have been:

Councillor	Party	From	To
Dave Tempest	Labour	Apr 1974	May 1975
Peter Longworth	Labour	May 1975	May 1978
Jim Lloyd	Labour	May 1978	May 1987
Jim Keight	Labour	May 1987	May 2003
Ron Round	Labour	21 May 2003	May 2015
Andy Moorhead	Labour	22 May 2015	May 2018
Graham Morgan	Labour	18 May 2018	

=== Composition ===
Following the May 2026 election, the composition of the council was:

Party	Seats
Labour	24
Green	8
Reform	4
Liberal Democrats	3
Independent	6
Total	45

The next election is due in 2027.

== Elections ==
Since the last boundary changes in 2016, the council has comprised 45 councillors representing 15 wards, each electing three councillors. Elections are held three years out of every four, with a third of the council (one councillor for each ward) elected each time for a four-year term of office.

== Premises ==
The council's main offices and meeting place are at the Municipal Buildings in Archway Road in Huyton. The building was completed in 1963 as the headquarters of Huyton-with-Roby Urban District Council, one of Knowsley's predecessor authorities.
