= 1933 Liverpool City Council election =

1933 English local government election

← 1932	1 November 1933	1934 →

38 councillors' seats were up for election

Elections to Liverpool City Council were held on 1 November 1933. One third of the council seats were up for election, the term of office of each councillor being three years.

Thirteen of the thirty eight seats up for election were uncontested.

After the election, the composition of the council was:

Party	Councillors	±	Aldermen	Total
Conservative	??	??	??	??
Labour	??	??	??	??
Liberal	??	??	??	??
Protestant	??	??	??	??

== Election result ==
Liverpool local election result 1933
Party	Seats	Gains	Losses	Net gain/loss	Seats %	Votes %	Votes	+/−
Conservative	16				41%	41%	44,340	
Labour	11				28%	47%	51,014	
Liberal	5				13%	1.8%	1,938	
Protestant	1				2.6%	7.3%	7,783	
Independent	2				5.2%	2.2%	2,419	
Communist	0				0%	0.18%	195	

== Ward results ==
* - Councillor seeking re-election

Comparisons are made with the 1930 election results.

=== Abercromby ===
No. 9 Abercromby
Party	Candidate	Votes	%	±%
Conservative	William Thomas Roberts *	1,896	56%	
Labour	Robert Tissyman	1,513	44%	
Majority		383		
Registered electors		9,619		
Turnout		3,409	35%	
Conservative hold		Swing		

=== Aigburth ===
No. 17 Aigburth
Party	Candidate	Votes	%	±%
Conservative	Edward James Deane *	2,132	63%	
Liberal	Arthur Donald Dennis	1,272	37%	
Majority		860		
Registered electors		9,165		
Turnout		3,404	37%	
Conservative hold		Swing		

=== Allerton ===
No. 35 Allerton
Party	Candidate	Votes	%	±%
Conservative	George Alfred Strong *	unopposed		
Registered electors		4,802		
Conservative hold		Swing		

=== Anfield ===
No. 29 Anfield
Party	Candidate	Votes	%	±%
Liberal	Arthur Richard Price *	unopposed		
Registered electors		10,703		
Liberal hold		Swing		

=== Breckfield ===
No. 30 Breckfield
Party	Candidate	Votes	%	±%
Conservative	Thomas Henry Burton *	2,054	52%	
Labour	Alfred Hargreaves	1,912	48%	
Majority		142		
Registered electors		14,547		
Turnout		3,966	27%	
Conservative hold		Swing		

=== Brunswick ===
No. 11 Brunswick
Party	Candidate	Votes	%	±%
Labour	Thomas Hanley	unopposed		
Registered electors		8,746		
Labour hold		Swing		

=== Castle Street ===
No. 7 Castle Street
Party	Candidate	Votes	%	±%
Liberal	William Denton	unopposed		
Registered electors				
Liberal hold		Swing		

=== Childwall ===
No. 38 Childwall
Party	Candidate	Votes	%	±%
Liberal	Alan Anderson Boyle	unopposed		
Registered electors				
Liberal hold		Swing		

=== Croxteth ===
No. 40 Croxteth
Party	Candidate	Votes	%	±%
Labour	Mrs. Mary Lilian Hamilton	3,898	70%	
Conservative	Percy Goss Moore	1,658	30%	
Majority		2,240		
Registered electors		15,544		
Turnout		5,556	36%	
Labour gain from Conservative		Swing		

=== Dingle ===
No. 12 Dingle
Party	Candidate	Votes	%	±%
Labour	Joseph Gibbins	4,700	56%	
Conservative	William Shaw Finlayson	2,565	31%	
Protestant	George Edward Lewis	1,087	13%	
Majority		2,135	25%	N/A
Registered electors		15,543		
Turnout		8,352	54%	
Labour gain from Conservative		Swing		

=== Edge Hill ===
No. 18 Edge Hill
Party	Candidate	Votes	%	±%
Labour	James Johnstone	2,834	55%	
Conservative	Herbert Henry Nuttall *	2,231	43%	
Communist	Charles William Heaton	107	2%	
Majority		603	12%	N/A
Registered electors		13,055		
Turnout		5,172	40%	
Labour gain from Conservative		Swing		

=== Everton ===
No. 21 Everton
Party	Candidate	Votes	%	±%
Labour	Bertie Victor Kirby *	3,547	67%	
Conservative	David Rowan	1,744	33%	
Majority		1,803	34%	
Registered electors		13,436		
Turnout		5,291	39%	
Labour hold		Swing		

=== Exchange ===
No. 5 Exchange
Party	Candidate	Votes	%	±%
Independent	James Farrell	837	83%	
Labour	Albert Smitton	166	17%	
Majority		671		
Registered electors		2,404		
Turnout		1,003	42%	
Independent hold		Swing		

=== Fairfield ===
No. 31 Fairfield
Party	Candidate	Votes	%	±%
Liberal	Charles Sydney Jones*	Unopposed	N/A	N/A
Registered electors				
Liberal hold				

=== Fazakerley ===
No. 27 Fazakerley
Party	Candidate	Votes	%	±%
Conservative	William Greenough Gregson *	2,262	51%	
Labour	Francis Lavery	2,161	49%	
Majority		2,262		
Registered electors		10,943		
Turnout		4,423	40%	
Conservative hold		Swing		

=== Garston ===
No. 37 Garston
Party	Candidate	Votes	%	±%
Labour	Joseph Jackson Cleary *	2,844	64%	
Conservative	James Moore	1,611	36%	
Majority		1,233		
Registered electors		7,741		
Turnout		4,455	58%	
Labour hold		Swing		

=== Granby ===
No. 14 Granby
Party	Candidate	Votes	%	±%
Conservative	William Adam Edwards *	1,618	50%	
Labour	David Nickson	1,617	50%	
Majority		1		
Registered electors		9,966		
Turnout		3,235	32%	
Conservative hold		Swing		

=== Great George ===
No. 10 Great George
Party	Candidate	Votes	%	±%
Labour	Joseph Campbell	1,047	66%	
Independent	John Loughlin	538	34%	
Majority		509		
Registered electors		4,912		
Turnout		1,585	32%	
Labour hold		Swing		

=== Kensington ===
No. 19 Kensington
Party	Candidate	Votes	%	±%
Conservative	John Moores	2,694	58%	
Labour	Alfred Donohoe	1,990	42%	
Majority		704		
Registered electors		11,169		
Turnout		4,684	42%	
Conservative hold		Swing		

=== Kirkdale ===
No. 24 Kirkdale
Party	Candidate	Votes	%	±%
Labour	Frederick Jones	3,187	45%	
Conservative	Ernest Tyrer	2,562	36%	
Protestant	William Reuben Price	1,301	18%	
Majority		625		
Registered electors		17,149		
Turnout		7,050	41%	
Labour gain from Conservative		Swing		

=== Low Hill ===
No. 20 Low Hill
Party	Candidate	Votes	%	±%
Labour	Alexander Kay	2,213	51%	
Conservative	Charles Edward Pugh	2,096	49%	
Majority		117		
Registered electors		17,149		
Turnout		4,309	38%	
Labour gain from Conservative		Swing		

=== Much Woolton ===
No. 36 Much Woolton
Party	Candidate	Votes	%	±%
Conservative	Joseph Butterfield	759	46%	
Independent	Ernest Whiteley	745	45%	
Labour	John Reginald Bevins	163	10%	
Majority		14		
Registered electors		2,558		
Turnout		1,667	65%	
Conservative hold		Swing		

=== Netherfield ===
No. 22 Netherfield
Party	Candidate	Votes	%	±%
Labour	John Bagot	2,823	40%	
Protestant	Richard Bradley	2,384	34%	
Conservative	Alfred Michael Urding *	1,815	26%	
Majority		439		
Registered electors		11.985		
Turnout		7,022	59%	
Labour gain from Conservative		Swing		

=== North Scotland ===
No. 2 North Scotland
Party	Candidate	Votes	%	±%
Labour	Frederick William Tucker *	2,715	97%	
Communist	Wilfred Frederick Fielding	88	3%	
Majority		2,627		
Registered electors				
Turnout		2,803		
Labour hold		Swing		

=== Old Swan ===
No. 32 Old Swan
Party	Candidate	Votes	%	±%
Conservative	Moss Greenberg *	2,919	53%	
Labour	Charles Matthew Belk	2,607	47%	
Majority		312		
Registered electors		16,463		
Turnout		5,526	34%	
Conservative hold		Swing		

=== Prince's Park ===
No. 13 Prince's Park
Party	Candidate	Votes	%	±%
Conservative	William Trevor Thomas	2,155	51%	
Labour	Alfred Demain	2,058	49%	
Majority		97		
Registered electors		9,968		
Turnout		4,213	42%	
Conservative hold		Swing		

=== Sandhills ===
No. 1 Sandhills
Party	Candidate	Votes	%	±%
Labour	John Wolfe Tone Morrissey *	unopposed		
Registered electors				
Labour hold		Swing		

=== St. Anne's ===
No. 6 St. Anne's
Party	Candidate	Votes	%	±%
Labour	Bessie Braddock *	Unopposed	N/A	N/A
Registered electors				
Labour hold				

=== St. Domingo ===
No. 23 St. Domingo
Party	Candidate	Votes	%	±%
Protestant	Harry Dixon Longbottom *	3,101	52%	
Conservative	William Edward Backhouse	1,907	32%	
Labour	Robert Joseph McDonnell	922	16%	
Majority		1,194		
Registered electors		11,669		
Turnout		5,930	51%	
Protestant hold		Swing		

=== St. Peter's ===
No. 8 St. Peter's
Party	Candidate	Votes	%	±%
Liberal	Mary Mabel Ellis *	666	68%	
Labour	Patrick Campbell	309	32%	
Majority		357		
Registered electors		2,778		
Turnout		975	35%	
Liberal hold		Swing		

=== Sefton Park East ===
No. 15 Sefton Park East
Party	Candidate	Votes	%	±%
Conservative	George Edward Holme *	unopposed		
Registered electors				
Conservative hold		Swing		

=== Sefton Park West ===
No. 16 Sefton Park West
Party	Candidate	Votes	%	±%
Conservative	Walter Thomas Lancashire *	unopposed		
Registered electors				
Conservative hold		Swing		

=== South Scotland ===
No. 3 South Scotland
Party	Candidate	Votes	%	±%
Labour	Michael John Reppion *	unopposed		
Registered electors				
Labour hold		Swing		

=== Vauxhall ===
No. 4 Vauxhall
Party	Candidate	Votes	%	±%
Independent	James O'Hare	1,044	63%	
Labour	John Edward Orford	622	37%	
Majority		422		
Registered electors		3,581		
Turnout		1,666	47%	
		Swing		

=== Walton ===
No. 25 Walton
Party	Candidate	Votes	%	±%
Conservative	Robert John Hall *	3,169	57%	
Labour	John Thomas Kenny	2,436	43%	
Majority		733		
Registered electors		16,251		
Turnout		5,605	34%	
Conservative hold		Swing		

=== Warbreck ===
No. 26 Warbreck
Party	Candidate	Votes	%	±%
Conservative	Hugh Wagstaff	2,706	71%	
Labour	Edward John McCartney	1,083	29%	
Majority		1,623		
Registered electors		12,524		
Turnout		3,689	30%	
Conservative hold		Swing		

=== Wavertree ===
No. 34 Wavertree
Party	Candidate	Votes	%	±%
Conservative	John Morris Griffith *	Unopposed		
Registered electors				
Conservative hold		Swing		

=== Wavertree West ===
No. 33 Wavertree West
Party	Candidate	Votes	%	±%
Conservative	Alfred Levy *	1,787	52%	
Labour	William James Riddick	1,647	48%	
Majority		140		
Registered electors				
Turnout		3,434		
Conservative hold		Swing		

=== West Derby ===
No. 28 West Derby
Party	Candidate	Votes	%	±%
Conservative	Ernest Ash Cookson *	unopposed		
Registered electors				
Conservative hold		Swing		

== Aldermanic Elections ==
=== Aldermanic Election 2 May 1934 ===
Caused by the death on 18 September 1933 of Alderman William Wallace Kelly (Conservative, last elected as an alderman on 9 November 1932).

Aldermanic Election 2 May 1934
Party	Candidate	Votes	%	Allocated ward
Conservative	Alfred Ernest Shennan	58	67%	No.
Labour	Lawrence King	28	33%	Not elected

=== Aldermanic Election 6 June 1934 ===
Caused by the death on 20 April 1934 of Alderman Sir Max Muspratt Bart. (Conservative, last elected as an alderman on 9 November 1932, in whose place, his widow, Councillor Lady Helena Agnes Dalrymple Muspratt J.P., (Conservative, elected to the Childwall ward on 1 November 1932) was elected by the councillors as an alderman on 6 June 1934

Aldermanic Election 6 June 1934
Party	Candidate	Votes	%	Allocated ward
Conservative	Helena Agnes Dalrymple Muspratt	56	100%	No. 17 Aigburth

== By-elections ==
=== No. 12 Dingle 20 March 1934 ===
Caused by the resignation of Councillor William Jones (Labour, last elected 1 November 1932).

No. 12 Dingle
Party	Candidate	Votes	%	±%
Labour	Charles Matthew Belk	2,875	54%	
Conservative	Herbert Henry Nuttall	2,479	46%	
Majority		396		
Registered electors		15,543		
Turnout		5,354	34%	
Labour hold		Swing		

=== No. 38 Childwall 26 June 1934 ===
Caused by the election as an alderman on 6 June 1934 of Councillor Lady Helena Agnes Dalrymple Muspratt J.P, (Conservative, elected to the Childwall ward on 1 November 1932) following the death on 20 April 1934 of her husband, Alderman Sir Max Muspratt Bart. (Conservative, last elected as an alderman on 9 November 1932.

No. 38 Childwall 26 June 1934
Party	Candidate	Votes	%	±%
Liberal	William John Tristram	1,033	53%	
	John Dudley Robert Terleton Tilney	929	47%	
Majority		104		
Registered electors				
Turnout		1,962		
Liberal gain from Conservative		Swing		

== See also ==
- Liverpool City Council
- Liverpool Town Council elections 1835 - 1879
- Liverpool City Council elections 1880–present
- Mayors and Lord Mayors of Liverpool 1207 to present
- History of local government in England
