= 1934 Liverpool City Council election =

1934 UK local government election

← 1933	1 November 1934	1935 →

40 councillors' seats were up for election

Elections to Liverpool City Council were held on 1 November 1934. One third of the council seats were up for election, the term of office of each councillor being three years.

Eight of the forty seats up for election were uncontested.

After the election, the composition of the council was:

Party	Councillors	±	Aldermen	Total
Conservative	??	??	??	??
Labour	??	??	??	??
Liberal	??	??	??	??
Protestant	??	??	??	??

== Election result ==
Liverpool local election result 1934
Party	Seats	Gains	Losses	Net gain/loss	Seats %	Votes %	Votes	+/−
Conservative	17				42.5%	50%	54,893	
Labour	19				47.5%	47%	51,216	
Liberal	1				2.5%	3.4%	3,749	
Independent	2				2.5%	0.88%	970	
Protestant	1				2.5%	6.2%	6,786	

== Ward results ==
* - Councillor seeking re-election

Comparisons are made with the 1931 election results.

=== Abercromby ===
No. 9 Abercromby
Party	Candidate	Votes	%	±%
Labour	Arthur Lumb	1,535	51%	
Conservative	Alexander Maver Finlason *	1,496	49%	
Majority		39		
Registered electors		9,633		
Turnout		3,031	31%	
Labour gain from Conservative		Swing		

=== Aigburth ===
No. 17 Aigburth
Party	Candidate	Votes	%	±%
Conservative	Eric Errington	2,001	59%	
Liberal	Arthur Donald Dennis	1,418	41%	
Majority		583		
Registered electors		9,653		
Turnout		3,419	35%	
Conservative hold		Swing		

=== Allerton ===
No. 35 Allerton
Party	Candidate	Votes	%	±%
Conservative	Mrs. Gertrude Elizabeth Wilson *	1,181	66%	
Labour	Cedrick Ernest Hargreaves	612	34%	
Majority		569		
Registered electors		4,639		
Turnout		1,793	39%	
Conservative hold		Swing		

=== Anfield ===
No. 29 Anfield
Party	Candidate	Votes	%	±%
Conservative	George Young Williamson *	2,244	65%	
Labour	Robert Hugh Williams	1,227	35%	
Majority		1,017		
Registered electors		10,696		
Turnout		3,471	32%	
Conservative hold		Swing		

=== Breckfield ===
No. 30 Breckfield
Party	Candidate	Votes	%	±%
Conservative	Henry James Pearson jun. *	1,880	52%	
Labour	Alfred Walker Boothman	1,365	38%	
Protestant	George Edward Lewis	389	11%	
Majority		515		
Registered electors		10,353		
Turnout		3,634	35%	
Conservative hold		Swing		

=== Brunswick ===
No. 11 Brunswick
Party	Candidate	Votes	%	±%
Labour	Patrick Moorhead *	unopposed		
Registered electors		8,580		
Labour hold		Swing		

=== Castle Street ===
No. 7 Castle Street
Party	Candidate	Votes	%	±%
Conservative	Herbert Neville Bewley	565	66%	
Ind. Conservative	William Edward MacLachlan	295	34%	
Majority		270		
Registered electors		2,203		
Turnout		860	39%	
Conservative hold		Swing		

=== Childwall ===
No. 38 Childwall
Party	Candidate	Votes	%	±%
Liberal	Mrs. Christine Maud Boyle	907	51%	
Conservative	Gifford Cameron Ollason *	866	49%	
Majority		41		
Registered electors		3,854		
Turnout		1,773	46%	
Liberal gain from Conservative		Swing		

=== Croxteth ===
No. 40 Croxteth
Party	Candidate	Votes	%	±%
Labour	Alfred Hargreaves	3,617	64%	
Conservative	John Loughlin	1,602	29%	
Protestant	Francis Kenny	392	7%	
Majority		2,015		
Registered electors		17,330		
Turnout		5,611	32%	
Labour gain from Conservative		Swing		

=== Dingle ===
No. 12 Dingle
Party	Candidate	Votes	%	±%
Labour	John David Towers	3,915	59%	
Conservative	Mrs.Nancy Proctor *	2,691	41%	
Majority		1,224		
Registered electors		15,330		
Turnout		6,606	43%	
Labour gain from Conservative		Swing		

=== Edge Hill ===
No. 18 Edge Hill
Party	Candidate	Votes	%	±%
Labour	Mrs.Agnes Mitton	2,499	53%	
Conservative	Stabley Ronald Williams *	2,212	47%	
Majority		287		
Registered electors		12,827		
Turnout		4,711	37%	
Labour gain from Conservative		Swing		

=== Everton ===
No. 21 Everton
Party	Candidate	Votes	%	±%
Labour	David Nickson	3,296	75%	
Conservative	Murray Rowland Fletcher Rogers	1,086	25%	
Majority		2,210		
Registered electors		12,827		
Turnout		4,382	34%	
Labour gain from Conservative		Swing		

=== Exchange ===
No. 5 Exchange
Party	Candidate	Votes	%	±%
Independent	Peter Kavanagh *	unopposed		
Registered electors		2,383		
Independent hold		Swing		

=== Fairfield ===
No. 31 Fairfield
Party	Candidate	Votes	%	±%
Conservative	Charles Gordon Snowden Gordon *	1,776	58%	
Labour	Richard Thomas Hughes	1,292	42%	
Majority		484		
Registered electors		10,385		
Turnout		3,068	30%	
Conservative hold		Swing		

=== Fazakerley ===
No. 27 Fazakerley
Party	Candidate	Votes	%	±%
Labour	Francis Lavery	2,203	50%	
Conservative	William Edward Backhouse	1,898	43%	
Protestant	Ronald Frederick Henderson	271	6%	
Majority		305		
Registered electors		11,422		
Turnout		4,372	38%	
Labour gain from Conservative		Swing		

=== Garston ===
No. 37 Garston
Party	Candidate	Votes	%	±%
Labour	John Herbert Webster	2,436	57%	
Conservative	Joseph Williams *	1,302	32%	
Protestant	James Moore	524	12%	
Majority		1,134		
Registered electors		7,395		
Turnout		4,262	58%	
Labour gain from Conservative		Swing		

=== Granby ===
No. 14 Granby
Party	Candidate	Votes	%	±%
Labour	Miss Mary Agnes Cumella	1,922	57%	
Liberal	Henry Humphreys Jones	1,424	43%	
Majority		498		
Registered electors		9,914		
Turnout		3,346	34%	
Labour gain from Liberal		Swing		

=== Great George ===
No. 10 Great George
Party	Candidate	Votes	%	±%
Labour	John Hamilton	1,121	66%	
Democratic Labour	Walter Oscar Stein	569	34%	
Majority		552		
Registered electors		4,916		
Turnout		1,690	34%	
Labour gain from Democratic Labour				

=== Kensington ===
No. 19 Kensington
Party	Candidate	Votes	%	±%
Conservative	John Case	2,233	58%	
Labour	Mrs. Sarah Ann Demain	1,587	42%	
Majority		646		
Registered electors		11,041		
Turnout		3,820	35%	
Conservative hold		Swing		

=== Kirkdale ===
No. 24 Kirkdale
Party	Candidate	Votes	%	±%
Labour	William James Riddick	3,204	42%	
Conservative	Francis Samuel Henwood Ashcroft *	3,171	42%	
Protestant	George Henry Dunbar	1,222	16%	
Majority		33		
Registered electors		16,985		
Turnout		7,597	45%	
Labour hold		Swing		

=== Little Woolton ===
No. 39 Little Woolton
Party	Candidate	Votes	%	±%
Conservative	Rupert Henry Bremner *	unopposed		
Registered electors		744		
Conservative hold		Swing		

=== Low Hill ===
No. 20 Low Hill
Party	Candidate	Votes	%	±%
Labour	Frederick Charles Pasco	2,235	54%	
Conservative	George William Prout	1,934	46%	
Majority		301		
Registered electors		11,171		
Turnout		4,169	37%	
Labour gain from Conservative		Swing		

=== Much Woolton ===
No. 36 Much Woolton
Party	Candidate	Votes	%	±%
Independent	Ernest Whitley	731	40%	
Conservative	Isaac Robinson	724	40%	
Ratepayers	Charles Frederick Hind	227	12%	
Labour	Andre John Holman	140	8%	
Majority		7		
Registered electors		2,591		
Turnout		1,822	70%	
Independent gain from Conservative		Swing		

=== Netherfield ===
No. 22 Netherfield
Party	Candidate	Votes	%	±%
Labour	Dr. Joseph Sytner	2,344	38%	
Protestant	Richard Bradley	1,912	31%	
Conservative	William John Matthew Clark *	1,855	30%	
Majority		432		
Registered electors		11,544		
Turnout		6,111	53%	
Labour gain from Conservative		Swing		

=== North Scotland ===
No. 2 North Scotland
Party	Candidate	Votes	%	±%
Labour	Patrick Fay	unopposed		
Registered electors		8,561		
Labour hold		Swing		

=== Old Swan ===
No. 32 Old Swan
Party	Candidate	Votes	%	±%
Conservative	John Waterworth *	3,145	53%	
Labour	Thomas Ernest Martin	2,792	47%	
Majority		353		
Registered electors		17,065		
Turnout		5,937	35%	
Conservative hold		Swing		

=== Prince's Park ===
No. 13 Prince's Park
Party	Candidate	Votes	%	±%
Labour	Alfred Demain	1,985	51%	
Conservative	James Burrows Noble	1,912	49%	
Majority		73		
Registered electors		9,860		
Turnout		3,897	40%	
Labour gain from Conservative		Swing		

=== Sandhills ===
No. 1 Sandhills
Party	Candidate	Votes	%	±%
Labour	Thomas Henry Dunford *	unopposed		
Registered electors		9,194		
Labour hold		Swing		

=== St. Anne's ===
No. 6 St. Anne's
Party	Candidate	Votes	%	±%
Labour	John David Mack *	unopposed		
Registered electors		8,228		
Labour hold		Swing		

=== St. Domingo ===
No. 23 St. Domingo
Party	Candidate	Votes	%	±%
Protestant	William Reuben Price	1,452	33%	
Conservative	Charles Harold Leftwich *	1,411	32%	
Labour	Frederick Stapleton	1,379	31%	
Protestant	Henry Smith Revill	193	4%	
Majority		41		
Registered electors				
Turnout		4,435		
Protestant gain from Conservative		Swing		

=== St. Peter's ===
No. 8 St. Peter's
Party	Candidate	Votes	%	±%
Conservative	Sydney James Hill	623	58%	
Labour	Stanley Part	445	42%	
Majority		178		
Registered electors		2,761		
Turnout		1,068	39%	
Conservative hold		Swing		

=== Sefton Park East ===
No. 15 Sefton Park East
Party	Candidate	Votes	%	±%
Conservative	George Webster Green Armour	unopposed		
Registered electors		8,892		
Conservative hold		Swing		

=== Sefton Park West ===
No. 16 Sefton Park West
Party	Candidate	Votes	%	±%
Conservative	James Graham Reece *	unopposed		
Registered electors		6,575		
Conservative hold		Swing		

=== South Scotland ===
No. 3 South Scotland
Party	Candidate	Votes	%	±%
Labour	Joseph Harrington *	unopposed		
Registered electors		8,428		
Labour hold		Swing		

=== Vauxhall ===
No. 4 Vauxhall
Party	Candidate	Votes	%	±%
Labour	Joseph Leo Carney	1,016	81%	
Democratic Labour	Mrs. Martha Veronica Fernie	239	19%	
Majority		777		
Registered electors		3,715		
Turnout		1,255	34%	
Labour gain from Democratic Labour				

=== Walton ===
No. 25 Walton
Party	Candidate	Votes	%	±%
Conservative	Reginald Richard Bailey *	3,080	51%	
Labour	John Thomas Kenny	2,527	42%	
Protestant	Robert Bradley	431	7%	
Majority		553		
Registered electors		16,305		
Turnout		6,038	37%	
Conservative hold		Swing		

=== Warbreck ===
No. 26 Warbreck
Party	Candidate	Votes	%	±%
Conservative	Alexander Critchley *	2,585	69%	
Labour	Albert Smitton	1,140	31%	
Majority		1,445		
Registered electors		12,539		
Turnout		3,725	30%	
Conservative hold		Swing		

=== Wavertree ===
No. 34 Wavertree
Party	Candidate	Votes	%	±%
Conservative	John Village *	3,232	73%	
Ind. Labour Party	Donald Henry James	1,184	27%	
Majority		2,048		
Registered electors		15,209		
Turnout		4,416	29%	
Conservative hold		Swing		

=== Wavertree West ===
No. 33 Wavertree West
Party	Candidate	Votes	%	±%
Conservative	Naphtali Julius Price *	1,766	56%	
Labour	Mrs. Sarah Anne McArd	1,376	44%	
Majority		390		
Registered electors		8,813		
Turnout		3,142	36%	
Conservative hold		Swing		

=== West Derby ===
No. 28 West Derby
Party	Candidate	Votes	%	±%
Conservative	Robert Duncan-French *	3,853	66%	
Labour	Laurence William Kennan	2,006	34%	
Majority		1,847		
Registered electors		18,854		
Turnout		5,859	31%	
Conservative hold		Swing		

== Aldermanic Elections ==
=== Aldermanic Election 6 February 1935 ===
Following the death on 8 January 1935 of Alderman Wilfred Bowring Stoddart (Conservative, elected as an alderman possibly following the death on 29 October 1932 of Alderman Joseph Dalton Flood. In his place, Councillor Alfred Gates JP (Liberal, elected for Anfield on 1 November 1932) of 15 Childwall Priory Road, Liverpool, was elected as an alderman on 6 February 1935.

Aldermanic Election 6 February 1935
Party	Candidate	Votes	%	Allocated ward
Liberal	Councillor Alfred Gates	61	58%	No. 1 Sandhills
Labour	Councillor Lawrence King	44	42%	Not elected

The term of office to expire on 9 November 1938.

=== Aldermanic Election 6 March 1935 ===
Following the death on 23 January 1935 of Alderman John Clancy (Labour, last elected as an alderman on 9 November 1929), Councillor James Bennett O.B.E. (Conservative, elected to the Castle Street ward at a by election on 29 November 1932 ), Managing Director of Red Rocks, Stanley Road, Hoylake, was elected as an alderman on 6 March 1935.

Aldermanic Election 6 March 1935
Party	Candidate	Votes	%	Allocated ward
Conservative	Councillor James Bennett O.B.E.	56	58%	No. 10 Great George
Labour	Councillor Lawrence King	40	42%	Not elected

The term of office to expire on 9 November 1935.

== By-elections ==
=== No. 1 Sandhills, 29 November 1934 ===
Caused by the death of Councillor James William Joseph Baker (Labour, elected for the Sandhills ward on 1 November 1932)

No. 1 Sandhills
Party	Candidate	Votes	%	±%
Labour	Stanley Part	unopposed		
Registered electors		9,194		
Labour hold		Swing		

=== No. 19 Kensington, 26 February 1935 ===
Caused by the resignation of Councillor John Moores (Conservative, elected to the Kensington ward on 1 November 1933).

No. 19 Kensington
Party	Candidate	Votes	%	±%
Conservative	Jack Cresswell	2,018	57%	
Labour	Mrs. Sarah Ann Demain	1,500	43%	
Majority		518		
Registered electors		11,041		
Turnout		3,518	32%	
Conservative hold		Swing		

=== No. 5 Exchange, 28 February 1935 ===
Caused by the death on 20 December 1934 of Councillor Miss Alice McCormick (Centre, elected 1 November 1932).

No. 5 Exchange
Party	Candidate	Votes	%	±%
Independent	Thomas Patrick Staunton	640	61%	
Centre	Joseph Gorman	417	39%	
Majority		223		
Registered electors		2,383		
Turnout		1,057	44%	
Independent gain from Centre				

=== No. 29 Anfield, 26 March 1935 ===
Following the death on 8 January 1935 of Alderman Wilfred Bowring Stoddart (Conservative, elected as an alderman possibly following the death on 29 October 1932 of Alderman Joseph Dalton Flood. In his place, Councillor Alfred Gates JP (Liberal, elected for Anfield on 1 November 1932) of 15 Childwall Priory Road, Liverpool, was elected as an alderman on 6 February 1935.

No. 29 Anfield
Party	Candidate	Votes	%	±%
Liberal	Alfred Rennick Gates	unopposed		
Registered electors		10,696		
Liberal hold		Swing		

=== No. 7 Castle Street ===
Following the death on 23 January 1935 of Alderman John Clancy (Labour, last elected as an alderman on 9 November 1929), Councillor James Bennett O.B.E. (Conservative, elected to the Castle Street ward at a by election on 29 November 1932 ) was elected as an alderman on 6 March 1935.

No. 7 Castle Street
Party	Candidate	Votes	%	±%
Majority				
Registered electors		2,203		
Turnout				
		Swing		

== See also ==
- Liverpool City Council
- Liverpool Town Council elections 1835 - 1879
- Liverpool City Council elections 1880–present
- Mayors and Lord Mayors of Liverpool 1207 to present
- History of local government in England
