= 1923 Liverpool City Council election =

1923 English local election

← 1922	1 November 1923	1924 →

38 councillors' seats were up for election

Elections to Liverpool City Council were held on 1 November 1923.

One third of the council seats were up for election. The term of office for each councillor being three years.

Twelve of the thirty-nine seats up for election were uncontested.

After the election, the composition of the council was:

Party	Councillors	±	Aldermen	Total
Conservative	65	??	25	90
Liberal	??	??	??	??
Irish Nationalist	21	??	3	24
National Liberal	??	??	??	??
Independent	10	??	4	14
Labour	3	??	2	5
Protestant	??	??	??	??
Communist	1	??	0	1

== Election result ==
Liverpool local election result 1923
Party	Seats	Gains	Losses	Net gain/loss	Seats %	Votes %	Votes	+/−
Conservative	23	0	1	-1	60%	40%	40,321	
Irish Nationalist	8	0	0	0	21%	18%	18,346	
Liberal	5	0	0	0	13%	13%	12,809	
National Liberal	2	2	0	+2	5%	1.9%	1,966	
Labour	0	0	1	-1	0%	26%	26,127	
Unemployed	0	0	0	0	0%	0.82%	835	
Patriotic Protestant	0	0	0	0	0%	0.051%	52	

== Ward results ==
* - Retiring Councillor seeking re-election

Comparisons are made with the 1920 election results, as the retiring councillors were elected in 1920.

=== Abercromby ===
No. 9 Abercromby
Party	Candidate	Votes	%	±%
Conservative	Cuthbert Frederick Francis	unopposed		
Registered electors				
Conservative hold		Swing		

=== Aigburth ===
No. 17 Aigburth
Party	Candidate	Votes	%	±%
Liberal	Albert Edward Jacob *	Unopposed	N/A	N/A
Registered electors				
Liberal hold				

=== Allerton ===
No. 35 Allerton - 2 seats
Party	Candidate	Votes	%	±%
National Liberal	Mrs. Gertrude Elizabeth Wilson	518	35%	
Conservative	William James Austin	475	32%	
Liberal	Frank Williams	388	26%	
Independent	J.H. Naylor junr.	116	8%	
Majority		130		
Registered electors		1,385		
Turnout		749	54%	
National Liberal gain from Conservative				
Conservative win (new seat)				

=== Anfield ===
No. 29 Anfield
Party	Candidate	Votes	%	±%
Liberal	Alfred Gates	2,400	47%	
Conservative	John Parry Thomas	1,866	36%	
Labour	William John Daniel	855	17%	
Majority		543		
Registered electors		9,448		
Turnout		5,121	54%	
Liberal hold		Swing		

=== Breckfield ===
No. 30 Breckfield
Party	Candidate	Votes	%	±%
Conservative	Alfred Griffiths *	unopposed		
Registered electors				
Conservative hold		Swing		

=== Brunswick ===
No. 11 Brunswick
Party	Candidate	Votes	%	±%
Irish Nationalist	Lawrence King *	3,488	96%	
Labour	James Henry Dutton	154	4.2%	
Majority		3,334		
Registered electors		8,197		
Turnout		3,642	44%	
Irish Nationalist hold		Swing		

=== Castle Street ===
No. 7 Castle Street
Party	Candidate	Votes	%	±%
Conservative	Frederick William Frodsham	793	65%	
Liberal	Thomas Royal Little	418	35%	
Majority		375		
Registered electors		2,668		
Turnout		1,211	45%	
Conservative hold		Swing		

=== Childwall ===
No. 38 Childwall
Party	Candidate	Votes	%	±%
Liberal	Lady Helena Agnes Dalrymple Muspratt *	unopposed		
Registered electors				
Liberal hold		Swing		

=== Dingle ===
No. 12 Dingle
Party	Candidate	Votes	%	±%
Conservative	Joseph Dalton Flood *	4,803	58%	
Labour	Joseph Gibbins	3,482	42%	
Unemployed	Dewi Protheroe	56	0.67%	
Majority		1,321		
Registered electors		13,963		
Turnout		8,341	60%	
Conservative hold		Swing		

=== Edge Hill ===
No. 18 Edge Hill
Party	Candidate	Votes	%	±%
Conservative	Daniel Charles Williams *	2,920	50%	
Labour	Charles Burden	2,690	46%	
Irish Nationalist	William Henry McGuiness	182	3%	
Patriotic Protestant	Charles Stamper	52	0.89%	
Majority		230		
Registered electors		12,328		
Turnout		5,844	47%	
Conservative hold		Swing		

=== Everton ===
No. 21 Everton
Party	Candidate	Votes	%	±%
Conservative	John Ellis *	3,177	65%	
Labour	John Henry Naylor	1,590	33%	
Unemployed	John Young	182	3%	
Majority		1,587		
Registered electors		12,850		
Turnout		4,882	38%	
Conservative hold		Swing		

=== Exchange ===
No. 5 Exchange
Party	Candidate	Votes	%	±%
Irish Nationalist	Miss Alice McCormick	904	59%	
Liberal	Mark Philip Rathbone	575	37%	
Independent	Joseph Masterman	50	3%	
Unemployed	John Bingham	7	0.5%	
Majority		329		
Registered electors		2,747		
Turnout		1,536	56%	
Irish Nationalist hold		Swing		

=== Fairfield ===
No. 31 Fairfield
Party	Candidate	Votes	%	±%
National Liberal	James Hughes *	1,966	54%	
Liberal	Walter Henry Davies	1,654	46%	
Majority		312		
Registered electors		9,159		
Turnout		3,620	40%	
National Liberal gain from Labour		Swing		

=== Fazakerley ===
No. 27 Fazakerley
Party	Candidate	Votes	%	±%
Conservative	Albert Harwood Letheren	unopposed		
Registered electors				
Conservative hold		Swing		

=== Garston ===
No. 37 Garston
Party	Candidate	Votes	%	±%
Conservative	John Case	1,841	49%	
Labour	Henry Osmond Pugh	1,375	37%	
Liberal	James Scott	530	14%	
Majority		466		
Registered electors		5,897		
Turnout		3,746	64%	
Conservative hold		Swing		

=== Granby ===
No. 14 Granby
Party	Candidate	Votes	%	±%
Independent	Miss Eleanor Florence Rathbone *	Unopposed	N/A	N/A
Registered electors				
Independent hold				

=== Great George ===
No. 10 Great George
Party	Candidate	Votes	%	±%
Irish Nationalist	William Grogan *	1,587	83%	
Labour	George Henry Bennett	322	17%	
Majority		1,265		
Registered electors		4,461		
Turnout		43%		
Irish Nationalist hold		Swing		

=== Kensington ===
No. 19 Kensington
Party	Candidate	Votes	%	±%
Conservative	Joseph Ashworth *	2,970	59%	
Labour	Frederick Jones	2,098	41%	
Majority		872		
Registered electors		10,677		
Turnout		5,068	47%	
Conservative hold		Swing		

=== Kirkdale ===
No. 24 Kirkdale
Party	Candidate	Votes	%	±%
Conservative	Dr. Archibald Gordon Gullan	unopposed		
Registered electors				
Conservative hold		Swing		

=== Low Hill ===
No. 20 Low Hill
Party	Candidate	Votes	%	±%
Conservative	Richard Henry Mitchell *	2,432	49%	
Labour	Thomas Joseph Rowan	1,770	36%	
Irish Nationalist	Joseph Lougran	708	14%	
Unemployed	Philip Maguire	33	0.67%	
Majority		662		
Registered electors		10,129		
Turnout		4,943	49%	
Conservative hold		Swing		

=== Much Woolton ===
No. 36 Much Woolton
Party	Candidate	Votes	%	±%
Conservative	John Francis Roskell Reynolds	unopposed		
Registered electors				
Conservative hold		Swing		

=== Netherfield ===
No. 22 Netherfield
Party	Candidate	Votes	%	±%
Conservative	William Edward McLaclan	2,655	62%	
Patriotic Protestant	Christopher Haigh	1,155	27%	
Labour	George Chadwick	470	11%	
Majority		1,510		
Registered electors		11,291		
Turnout		4,290	38%	
Conservative hold		Swing		

=== North Scotland ===
No. 2 North Scotland
Party	Candidate	Votes	%	±%
Irish Nationalist	John Patrick Farrelly	2,412	51%	
Labour	Edward Campbell	2,283	49%	
Majority		129		
Registered electors		8,075		
Turnout		4,695	58%	
Irish Nationalist hold		Swing		

=== Old Swan ===
No. 32 Old Swan
Party	Candidate	Votes	%	±%
Conservative	Alfred Ernest Shennan *	3,011	60%	
Labour	Herbert Edward Rose	1,965	39%	
Irish Nationalist	William O'Neil	67	1.3%	
Majority		1,046		
Registered electors		11,476		
Turnout		5,043	44%	
Conservative hold		Swing		

=== Prince's Park ===
No. 13 Prince's Park
Party	Candidate	Votes	%	±%
Conservative	Alfred Wood *	unopposed		
Registered electors				
Conservative hold		Swing		

=== Sandhills ===
No. 1 Sandhills
Party	Candidate	Votes	%	±%
Irish Nationalist	James William Baker *	2,680	84%	
Labour	Patrick Roy	353	11%	
Unemployed	Daniel Williams	161	5%	
Majority		2,327		
Registered electors		8,711		
Turnout		3,194	37%	
Irish Nationalist hold		Swing		

=== St. Anne's ===
No. 6 St. Anne's
Party	Candidate	Votes	%	±%
Irish Nationalist	Patrick Alfred Durkin *	2,155	62%	
Labour	Richard McCann	903	26%	
Unemployed	Alexander Phillips	432	12%	
Majority		1,252		
Registered electors		9,412		
Turnout		3,490	37%	
Irish Nationalist hold		Swing		

=== St. Domingo ===
No. 23 St. Domingo
Party	Candidate	Votes	%	±%
Conservative	William Edward Backhouse *	unopposed		
Registered electors				
Conservative hold		Swing		

=== St. Peter's ===
No. 8 St. Peter's
Party	Candidate	Votes	%	±%
Liberal	Lawrence Durning Holt *	946	65%	
Independent	Frederick Bowman	333	23%	
Irish Nationalist	Owen Geraghty	155	11%	
Unemployed	Isaac Edward Ashton	16	1.1%	
Majority		613		
Registered electors		2,729		
Turnout		1,450	53%	
Liberal hold		Swing		

=== Sefton Park East ===
No. 15 Sefton Park East
Party	Candidate	Votes	%	±%
Conservative	Michael Cory Dixon *	unopposed		
Registered electors				
Conservative hold		Swing		

=== Sefton Park West ===
No. 16 Sefton Park West
Party	Candidate	Votes	%	±%
Liberal	Frank Campbell Wilson *	unopposed		
Registered electors				
Liberal hold		Swing		

=== South Scotland ===
No. 3 South Scotland
Party	Candidate	Votes	%	±%
Irish Nationalist	John Gerald Murphy	2,841	59%	
Labour	David Gilbert Logan *	2,014	41%	
Majority		827		
Registered electors		8,269		
Turnout		4,855	59%	
Irish Nationalist hold		Swing		

=== Vauxhall ===
No. 4 Vauxhall
Party	Candidate	Votes	%	±%
Irish Nationalist	Dr. Percy Hayes	1,167	79%	
Labour	Joseph McChrystal	294	20%	
Unemployed	Joseph William Veldman	15	1%	
Majority		873		
Registered electors		3,720		
Turnout		1,476	40%	
Irish Nationalist hold		Swing		

=== Walton ===
No. 25 Walton
Party	Candidate	Votes	%	±%
Conservative	George Miller Platt *	3,029	78%	
Liberal	Joseph Edward Freeman	842	22%	
Majority		2,187		
Registered electors		12,471		
Turnout		3,871	31%	
Conservative hold		Swing		

=== Warbreck ===
No. 26 Warbreck
Party	Candidate	Votes	%	±%
Conservative	John Albert Thompson *	2,287	61%	
Liberal	William Pritchard	1,467	39%	
Majority		820		
Registered electors		10,963		
Turnout		3,754	34%	
Conservative hold		Swing		

=== Wavertree ===
No. 34 Wavertree
Party	Candidate	Votes	%	±%
Conservative	Henry Langton Beckwith *	2,184	47%	
Liberal	Hugh Frame	1,318	29%	
Labour	Robert Tissyman	1,110	24%	
Majority		866		
Registered electors		10,314		
Turnout		4,612	45%	
Conservative hold		Swing		

=== Wavertree West ===
No. 33 Wavertree West
Party	Candidate	Votes	%	±%
Conservative	Edwin Haigh *	1,915	45%	
Liberal	Alexander Maber Finlason	1,193	28%	
Labour	Charles Matthew Belk	1,129	27%	
Majority		722		
Registered electors		8,396		
Turnout		4,237	50%	
Conservative hold		Swing		

=== West Derby ===
No. 28 West Derby
Party	Candidate	Votes	%	±%
Conservative	Frederick William Riley *	3,953	63%	
Labour	Henry Arthur Crick	1,270	20%	
Liberal	Samuel Skelton jun.	1,078	17%	
Majority		2,683		
Registered electors		12,909		
Turnout		6,301	49%	
Conservative hold		Swing		

== Aldermanic Elections ==
=== Aldermanic Election 9 November 1923 ===
At the meeting of the Council on 9 November 1923, the terms of office of eighteen alderman expired.

The following eighteen were elected as Aldermen by the councillors on 9 November 1923 for a term of six years.

- - re-elected aldermen.

Party	Alderman	Ward
Conservative	William James Burgess JP *	
Conservative	Harold Edward Davies	
Conservative	Thomas Dowd *	
Conservative	John Edwards	
Conservative	Sir William Bower Forwood DL JP *	
Conservative	John Gordon	
Conservative	Robert Charles Herman *	
Conservative	Samuel Mason Hutchinson JP *	
Conservative	Arthur Stanley Mather JP *	
Conservative	Maxwell Hyslop Maxwell JP *	
Conservative	John George Moyles JP *	
Conservative	William Muirhead JP *	
Conservative	John George Paris *	
Conservative	Charles Henry Rutherford *	
Irish Nationalist	John Gregory Taggart JP *	
Conservative	John Utting JP *	
Conservative	James Wilson Walker *	
Conservative	Hartley Wilson JP *	

=== Aldermanic Election 4 June 1924 ===
Caused by the death of Alderman William Henry Watts (Liberal, last elected as an alderman on 9 November 1920) on 13 March 1924 .

In his place Councillor James Bolger (Irish Nationalist), North Scotland, elected 1 November 1921) was elected as an alderman by the councillors on 4 June 1924 .

Party	Alderman	Ward	Term expires
Irish Nationalist	James Bolger	No. 6 St. Anne's	1926

== By-elections ==
=== No. 13 Princes Park, 22 November 1923 ===
Caused by the resignation of Councillor David Jackson (Conservative, Prince's Park, elected 1 November 1922) which was reported to the Council on 9 November 1923

No. 13 Prince's Park
Party	Candidate	Votes	%	±%
Conservative	David Mawdsley Ritchie	2,636	70%	
Labour	Louise Hughes	1,128	30%	
Majority		1,508		
Registered electors				
Turnout		3,764		
Conservative hold		Swing		

The term of office to expire on 1 November 1925.

=== No. 17 Aigburth, 17 January 1924 ===
Caused by the death on 19 December 1923 of Councillor John Ritchie (Conservative, Aigburth, elected 1 November 1921) .

No. 17 Aigburth
Party	Candidate	Votes	%	±%
Conservative	Edward James Deane	1,407	52%	
Liberal	Colonel Albert Melly	1,319	48%	
Majority		88		
Registered electors				
Turnout		2,726		
Conservative hold		Swing		

=== No. 23 Netherfield, 9 April 1924 ===
Caused by the election of Councillor Harold Edward Davies (Conservative, Netherfield, elected 1 November 1921) as an alderman by the councillors on 9 November 1923

No. 22 Netherfield
Party	Candidate	Votes	%	±%
Conservative	Alfred Michael Urding	2,134	76%	
	Christopher Haigh	673	24%	
Majority		1,461		
Registered electors		11,291		
Turnout		2,807	25%	
Conservative hold		Swing		

=== No. 12 Dingle, 30 July 1924 ===
Caused by the death of Councillor William Pemberton Coslett (Liberal, Dingle, elected 1 November 1921) on 16 October 1923 which was reported to the Council on 24 October 1923.

No. 12 Dingle
Party	Candidate	Votes	%	±%
Conservative	Frank Bennett Brown	3,769	52%	
	Horace Godden Cole	3,420	48%	
Majority		349		
Registered electors		13,963		
Turnout		7,189	51%	
Conservative gain from Liberal		Swing		

=== No. 2 North Scotland 10 July 1924 ===
Caused by the election by the councillors of Councillor James Bolger (Irish Nationalist), North Scotland, elected 1 November 1921) as an alderman on 4 June 1924, following the death of Alderman William Henry Watts (Liberal, last elected as an alderman on 9 November 1920) on 13 March 1924.

No. 2 North Scotland
Party	Candidate	Votes	%	±%
Labour	David Gilbert Logan	3,272	79%	
	Thomas Joseph Hennessy	881	21%	
Majority		2,391		
Registered electors		8,075		
Turnout		4,153	51%	
Irish Nationalist hold		Swing		

== See also ==
- Liverpool City Council
- Liverpool Town Council elections 1835 - 1879
- Liverpool City Council elections 1880–present
- Mayors and Lord Mayors of Liverpool 1207 to present
- History of local government in England
