= Warren Bradley =

Warren Bradley may refer to:

- Warren Ives Bradley (1847–1868), American author who wrote as Glance Gaylord
- Warren Bradley (footballer) (1933–2007), English footballer
- Warren Bradley (politician), former leader of Liverpool City Council
