= 2006 Liverpool City Council election =

2006 UK local government election

← 2004	4 May 2006	2007 →

30 of 90 seats (one-third) to Liverpool City Council 46 seats needed for a majority
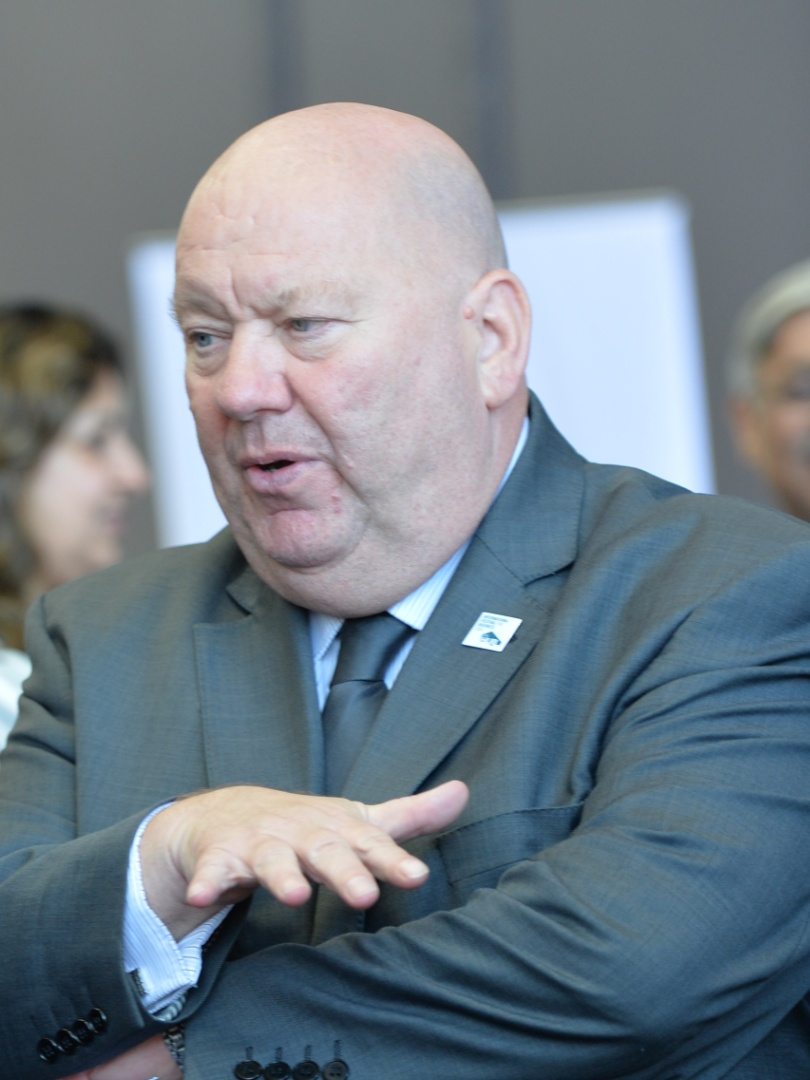

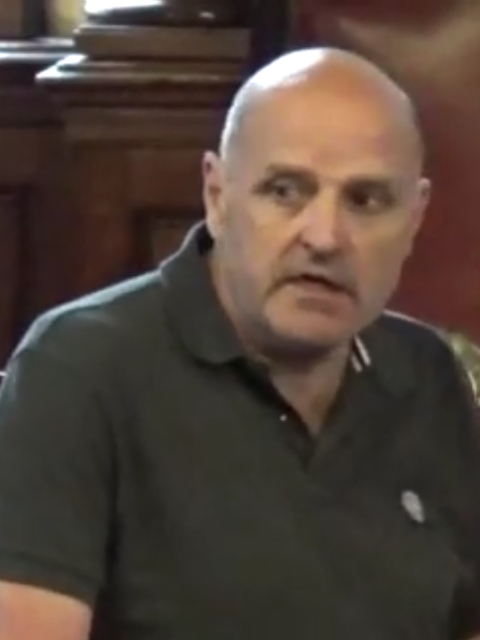
	First party	Second party
Leader	Warren Bradley	Joe Anderson
Party	Liberal Democrats	Labour
Leader's seat	Wavertree	Riverside
Seats before	60	27
Seats after	57	30
Seat change	-3	+3
Popular vote	34,794	32,273
Percentage	40.5%	37.6%
Swing	-12.4%	+4.4%
	Third party	Fourth party
Leader	Steve Radford
Party	Liberal	Green
Leader's seat	Tuebrook and Stoneycroft
Seats before	3	1
Seats after	3	1
Seat change	0	0
Popular vote	6,432	5,112
Percentage	7.5%	5.9%
Swing	+1.7%	+3.0%
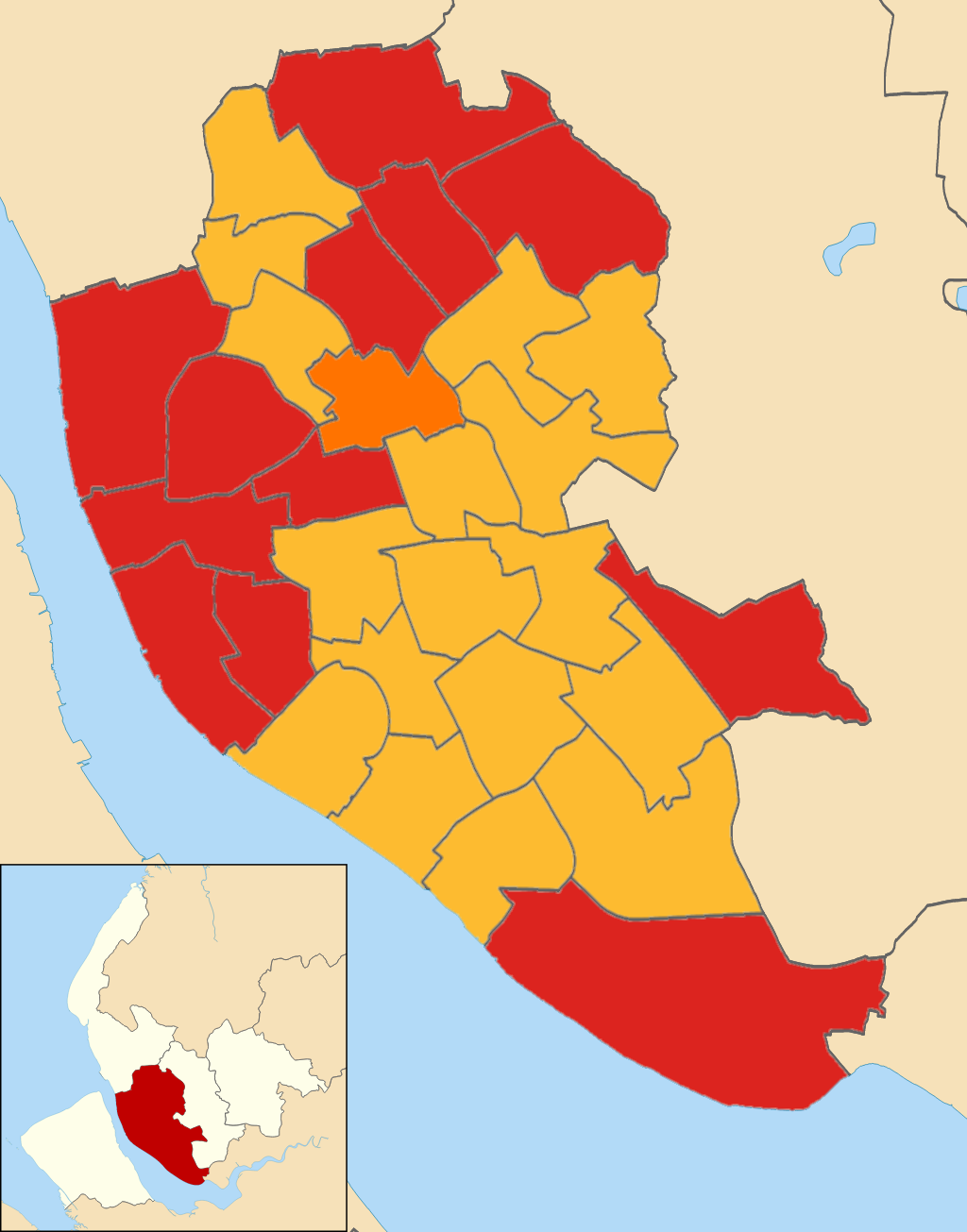
- Map showing the results of the 2006 Liverpool City Council election
Control of Council before election
Liberal Democrats
Elected Control of Council
Liberal Democrats

Elections to Liverpool City Council were held on 4 May 2006. One third of the council was up for election and the Liberal Democrat party kept overall control of the council. Overall turnout was 25%.

After the election, the composition of the council was

Party	Seats	±
Liberal Democrat	56	-3
Labour	30	+3
Liberal Party	3	0
Green	1	0

== Election result ==
Liverpool local election result 2006
Party	Seats	Gains	Losses	Net gain/loss	Seats %	Votes %	Votes	+/−
Liberal Democrats	17	0	3	-3	56.7	40.5	34,794	-12.4%
Labour	12	3	0	+3	40.0	37.6	32,273	+4.4%
Liberal	1	0	0	0	3.3	7.5	6,432	+1.7%
Conservative	0	0	0	0	0	6.7	5,766	+3.5%
Green	0	0	0	0	0	5.9	5,112	+3.0%
BNP	0	0	0	0	0	0.5	417	+0.4%
UKIP	0	0	0	0	0	0.4	332	+0.3%
Respect	0	0	0	0	0	0.3	281	+0.3%
Independent	0	0	0	0	0	0.3	274	+0.0%
United Socialist	0	0	0	0	0	0.2	132	+0.2%
Socialist Labour	0	0	0	0	0	0.2	130	-0.1%

== Ward results ==
=== Allerton and Hunts Cross ===
Allerton and Hunts Cross
Party	Candidate	Votes	%	±%
Liberal Democrats	Vera Best	1,619	49.6%	
Labour	Daniel Hughes	687	21.0	
Conservative	Brenda Coppell	556	17.0	
Green	Margaret Williams	211	6.5	
Liberal	Christopher Hulme	194	5.9	
Majority		932	28.6	
Registered electors		10,883		
Turnout		3,267	30	
Rejected ballots		5		
Liberal Democrats hold		Swing		

=== Anfield ===
Anfield
Party	Candidate	Votes	%	±%
Liberal Democrats	Andrew Tremarco	1,101	42.3%	
Labour	Brian Dowling	824	31.7	
Liberal	Michael Butler	448	17.2	
Green	Shane Delaney	133	5.1	
Conservative	Allen Epsley	95	3.7	
Majority		177	10.6	
Registered electors		11,166		
Turnout		2,601	23	
Rejected ballots		11		
Liberal Democrats hold		Swing		

=== Belle Vale ===
Belle Vale
Party	Candidate	Votes	%	±%
Labour	Pauline Walton	1,903	51.7%	
Liberal Democrats	Peter Rainford	1,556	42.2	
Liberal	Deborah Mayes	131	3.6	
Conservative	Norman Coppell	94	2.6	
Majority		347	9.5	
Registered electors		11,385		
Turnout		3,684	32	
Rejected ballots		12		
Labour hold		Swing		

=== Central ===
Central
Party	Candidate	Votes	%	±%
Labour	Nick Small	719	53.3%	
Liberal Democrats	Paul Twigger	395	29.3	
Green	Peter Cranie	104	7.7	
Conservative	Mark Cottrell	102	7.6	
Liberal	Karl Prescott	29	2.1	
Majority		324	24.0	
Registered electors		11,240		
Turnout		1,349	12	
Rejected ballots		7		
Labour hold		Swing		

=== Childwall ===
Childwall
Party	Candidate	Votes	%	±%
Liberal Democrats	Trevor Jones	2,084	61.9%	
Labour	Janet Kent	661	19.6	
Conservative	June Brandwood	294	8.7	
Green	Faye Griffiths	242	7.2	
Liberal	Francis Porter	87	2.6	
Majority		1,423	42.3	
Registered electors		11,320		
Turnout		3,368	30	
Rejected ballots		14		
Liberal Democrats hold		Swing		

=== Church ===
Church
Party	Candidate	Votes	%	±%
Liberal Democrats	Colin Eldridge	2,306	60.2%	
Labour	Timothy Beaumont	501	13.1	
Green	Eleanor Martin	335	8.7	
Conservative	Graham Jones	291	7.6	
Independent	Jeffrey Berman	274	7.2	
Liberal	James MacGregor	122	3.2	
Majority		1,805	47.1	
Registered electors		11,148		
Turnout		3,829	34	
Rejected ballots		7		
Liberal Democrats hold		Swing		

=== Clubmoor ===
Clubmoor
Party	Candidate	Votes	%	±%
Labour	Roz Gladden	1,440	48.6%	
Liberal	David Maher	791	26.7	
Liberal Democrats	James Gaskell	410	13.8	
Conservative	Gwynneth Hicklin	132	4.5	
Green	Andrew Hoban	120	4.0	
Socialist Labour	Kai Anderson	71	2.4	
Majority		649		
Registered electors		11,794		
Turnout		2,964	25	
Rejected ballots		7		
Labour hold		Swing		

=== County ===
County
Party	Candidate	Votes	%	±%
Liberal Democrats	Paul Clark	1,380	52.7%	
Labour	Patrick Delahunty	1,080	41.3	
Liberal	Roger Webb	84	3.2	
Conservative	Francis Stevens	73	2.8	
Majority		300	11.4	
Registered electors		10,874		
Turnout		2,617	24	
Rejected ballots		9		
Liberal Democrats hold		Swing		

=== Cressington ===
Cressington
Party	Candidate	Votes	%	±%
Liberal Democrats	Richard Oglethorpe	1,856	52.5%	
Labour	Catherine Dooley	778	22.0	
Conservative	Emlyn Williams	381	10.8	
Green	Richard De Pesando	292	8.3	
Liberal	John Moore	227	6.4	
Majority		1,078	30.5	
Registered electors		11,251		
Turnout		3,534	31	
Rejected ballots		7		
Liberal Democrats hold		Swing		

=== Croxteth ===
Croxteth
Party	Candidate	Votes	%	±%
Labour	Nadia Stewart	1,804	61.5%	
Liberal Democrats	Patrick Moloney	902	30.7	
Green	Anne Graham	151	5.1	
Liberal	Mary-Jane Canning	77	2.6	
Majority		902	30.8	
Registered electors		10,560		
Turnout		2,934	28	
Rejected ballots		9		
Labour hold		Swing		

=== Everton ===
Everton
Party	Candidate	Votes	%	±%
Labour	John McIntosh	1,519	68.8%	
Liberal Democrats	Craig Crennell	296	13.4	
Conservative	Matthew Sephton	140	6.3	
Green	Adam Howarth	137	6.2	
Liberal	David Wood	117	5.3	
Majority		1,223	55.4	
Registered electors		11,143		
Turnout		2,209	20	
Rejected ballots		10		
Labour hold		Swing		

=== Fazakerley ===
Fazakerley
Party	Candidate	Votes	%	±%
Labour	Dave Hanratty	1,450	48.1%	
Liberal Democrats	Graham Seddon	1,333	44.2	
Liberal	Charles Mayes	121	4.0	
Conservative	Myra Fitzsimmons	113	3.7	
Majority		117	3.9	
Registered electors		11,821		
Turnout		3,017	26	
Rejected ballots		24		
Labour hold		Swing		

=== Greenbank ===
Greenbank
Party	Candidate	Votes	%	±%
Liberal Democrats	Linda-Jane Buckle	1,025	40.8%	
Labour	Christopher Helm	627	25.0	
Green	Louise McVey	485	19.3	
Conservative	Giselle McDonald	246	9.8	
Liberal	David O'Brien	130	5.2	
Majority		398	15.8	
Registered electors		10,921		
Turnout		2,513	23	
Rejected ballots		12		
Liberal Democrats hold		Swing		

=== Kensington and Fairfield ===
Kensington and Fairfield
Party	Candidate	Votes	%	±%
Labour	Louise Baldock	1,127	45.0%	
Liberal Democrats	James Kendrick	955	38.2	
Liberal	Elizabeth Pascoe	180	7.2	
Green	Paula Rice	152	6.1	
Conservative	Francis Dunne	88	3.5	
Majority		172	6.8	
Registered electors		10,355		
Turnout		2,502	24	
Rejected ballots		8		
Labour gain from Liberal Democrats		Swing		

=== Kirkdale ===
Kirkdale
Party	Candidate	Votes	%	±%
Labour	Malcolm Kennedy	1,958	78.2%	
Liberal Democrats	Francis O'Donoghue	232	9.3	
UKIP	Joseph Moran	182	7.3	
Conservative	Thomas O'Brien	69	2.8	
Green	Alexander Taylor	64	2.6	
Majority		1,726	68.9	
Registered electors		11,828		
Turnout		2,505	21	
Rejected ballots		8		
Labour hold		Swing		

=== Knotty Ash ===
Knotty Ash
Party	Candidate	Votes	%	±%
Liberal Democrats	Josie Mullen	1,275	44.1%	
Labour	Anthony Concepcion	1,175	40.7	
Liberal	Andrew Donaldson	240	8.3	
Conservative	Michael Lind	199	6.9	
Majority		100	3.4	
Registered electors		10,482		
Turnout		2,889	28	
Rejected ballots		14		
Liberal Democrats hold		Swing		

=== Mossley Hill ===
Mossley Hill
Party	Candidate	Votes	%	±%
Liberal Democrats	Tina Gould	1,906	55.5%	
Labour	Josephine Lazzari	617	18.0	
Conservative	Ann Nugent	382	11.1	
Green	Vicki Anderson	367	10.7	
Liberal	Patricia Elmour	160	4.7	
Majority		1,289	37.5	
Registered electors		10,660		
Turnout		3,432	32	
Rejected ballots		19		
Liberal Democrats hold		Swing		

=== Norris Green ===
Norris Green
Party	Candidate	Votes	%	±%
Labour	Violet Bebb	1,387	59.2%	
BNP	John Edgar	417	17.8	
Liberal Democrats	Christine Doyle	232	9.9	
Green	Eric Cartmel	111	4.7	
Liberal	Vera Phillips	99	4.2	
Conservative	Jonathan Kearney	95	4.1	
Majority		970	41.4	
Registered electors		11,099		
Turnout		2,341	21	
Rejected ballots		3		
Labour hold		Swing		

=== Old Swan ===
Old Swan
Party	Candidate	Votes	%	±%
Liberal Democrats	Keith Turner	1,436	48.4%	
Labour	Wendy Simon	859	29.0	
Liberal	Edith Bamford	172	5.8	
UKIP	Mark Bill	150	5.1	
Conservative	Pauline Dougherty	148	5.0	
Green	Paul Grimes	134	4.5	
United Socialist	Paul Filby	68	2.3	
Majority		577	19.4	
Registered electors		12,260		
Turnout		2,967	24	
Rejected ballots		13		
Liberal Democrats hold		Swing		

=== Picton ===
Picton
Party	Candidate	Votes	%	±%
Liberal Democrats	Laurence Sidorczuk	1,253	49.5%	
Labour	Angela Glanville	879	34.8	
Liberal	Griffith Parry	217	8.6	
Green	Nilesh Chauhan	180	7.1	
Majority		374	14.7	
Registered electors		11,958		
Turnout		2,529	21	
Rejected ballots		16		
Liberal Democrats hold		Swing		

=== Princes Park ===
Princes Park
Party	Candidate	Votes	%	±%
Labour	Anna Rothery	1,184	44.5%	
Liberal Democrats	Mohamed Ali	645	24.2%	
Respect	Paul Desson	281	10.6	
Green	Sophy Hansford	246	9.2	
Liberal	Nina Edge	210	7.9	
Conservative	Alma McGing	96	3.6	
Majority		539	20.3	
Registered electors		11,015		
Turnout		2,662	24	
Rejected ballots		22		
Labour gain from Liberal Democrats		Swing		

=== Riverside ===
Riverside
Party	Candidate	Votes	%	±%
Labour	Joe Anderson	1,562	66.0%	
Liberal Democrats	Gabriel Muies	267	11.3	
Conservative	Richard Perkins	205	8.7	
Green	Jonathan Clatworthy	180	7.6	
Liberal	Irene Mayes	90	3.8	
United Socialist	Cecilia Ralph	64	2.7	
Majority		1,295	54.7	
Registered electors		11,174		
Turnout		2,368	21	
Rejected ballots		12		
Labour hold		Swing		

=== St Michaels ===
St Michaels
Party	Candidate	Votes	%	±%
Liberal Democrats	Peter Allen	1,112	41.5%	
Green	Jean Hill	675	25.2	
Labour	Jack Johnson	670	25.0	
Conservative	David Patmore	225	8.4	
Majority		437	16.3	
Registered electors		10,288		
Turnout		2,682	26	
Rejected ballots		16		
Liberal Democrats hold		Swing		

=== Speke-Garston ===
Speke-Garston
Party	Candidate	Votes	%	±%
Labour	Doreen Knight	2,141	59.3%	
Liberal Democrats	Francis Roderick	1,138	31.5	
Green	Cherry Fitzsimmons	141	3.9	
Conservative	Denise Nuttall	107	3.0	
Liberal	Michael Williams	84	2.3	
Majority		1,003	27.8	
Registered electors		13,220		
Turnout		3,611	27	
Rejected ballots		17		
Labour gain from Liberal Democrats		Swing		

=== Tuebrook and Stoneycroft ===
Tuebrook and Stoneycroft
Party	Candidate	Votes	%	±%
Liberal	Chris Lenton	1,587	60.6%	
Labour	Allen Hammond	628	24.0	
Liberal Democrats	Richard Williams	308	11.8	
Conservative	Damian Fisher	96	3.7	
Majority		959	36.6	
Registered electors		11,743		
Turnout		2,619	22	
Rejected ballots		17		
Liberal hold		Swing		

=== Warbreck ===
Warbreck
Party	Candidate	Votes	%	±%
Liberal Democrats	Jean Seddon	1,380	45.2%	
Labour	Ann-Marie O'Bryne	1,353	44.3	
Liberal	Linda Roberts	185	6.1	
Conservative	Paul Barber	135	4.4	
Majority		27	0.9	
Registered electors		11,199		
Turnout		3,053	27	
Rejected ballots		33		
Liberal Democrats hold		Swing		

=== Wavertree ===
Wavertree
Party	Candidate	Votes	%	±%
Liberal Democrats	Steve Hurst	1,928	64.5%	
Labour	Claire Wilner	553	18.5	
Green	Julie Birch-Holt	260	8.7	
Conservative	David Grundy	142	4.7	
Liberal	Susan O'Brien	107	3.6	
Majority		1,375	46.0	
Registered electors		10,782		
Turnout		2,990	28	
Rejected ballots		11		
Liberal Democrats hold		Swing		

=== West Derby ===
West Derby
Party	Candidate	Votes	%	±%
Liberal Democrats	Stuart Monkcom	1,416	49.5%	
Labour	Ronald Foy	652	22.8	
Conservative	Geoffrey Brandwood	308	10.8	
Liberal	Stephen Houghland	222	7.8	
Green	Ian Graham	204	7.1	
Socialist Labour	Stephen Hill	59	2.1	
Majority		764	26.7	
Registered electors		11,345		
Turnout		2,861	25	
Rejected ballots		7		
Liberal Democrats hold		Swing		

=== Woolton ===
Woolton
Party	Candidate	Votes	%	±%
Liberal Democrats	Malcolm Kelly	1,959	56.3%	
Conservative	Stephen Fitzsimmons	752	21.6	
Labour	Laurence Freeman	459	13.2	
Green	Alexander Rudkin	188	5.4	
Liberal	Maria Langley	124	3.6	
Majority		1,207	34.7	
Registered electors		10,548		
Turnout		3,482	33	
Rejected ballots		10		
Liberal Democrats hold		Swing		

=== Yew Tree ===
Yew Tree
Party	Candidate	Votes	%	±%
Liberal Democrats	Roger Johnston	1,089	42.4%	
Labour	Barbara Murray	1,076	41.9	
Conservative	Brian Jones	202	7.9	
Liberal	Tracey Hawksford	197	7.7	
Majority		13	0.5	
Registered electors		11,290		
Turnout		2,567	23	
Rejected ballots		9		
Liberal Democrats hold		Swing		

== By Elections ==
=== Speke-Garston 8 March 2007 ===
Speke-Garston By-Election 8 March 2007
Party	Candidate	Votes	%	±%
Labour	Colin Strickland	1,984	54%	−5.0
Liberal Democrats	Lynnie Williams	1,218	33.3	+1.8
BNP	Steven Greenhalgh	281	7.7	+7.7
Green	Cherry Fitzsimmons	68	1.9	−2.0
Conservative	Brenda Coppell	54	1.5	−1.5
UKIP	Mark Bill	49	1.3	+1.3
Majority		766	21.0	
Registered electors				
Turnout		3,654	28.7	
Rejected ballots				
Labour gain from Liberal Democrats		Swing		
