= 2007 Liverpool City Council election =

2007 UK local government election

- 3 May 2007

30 seats were up for election (one third): one seat for each of the 30 wards 46 seats needed for a majority
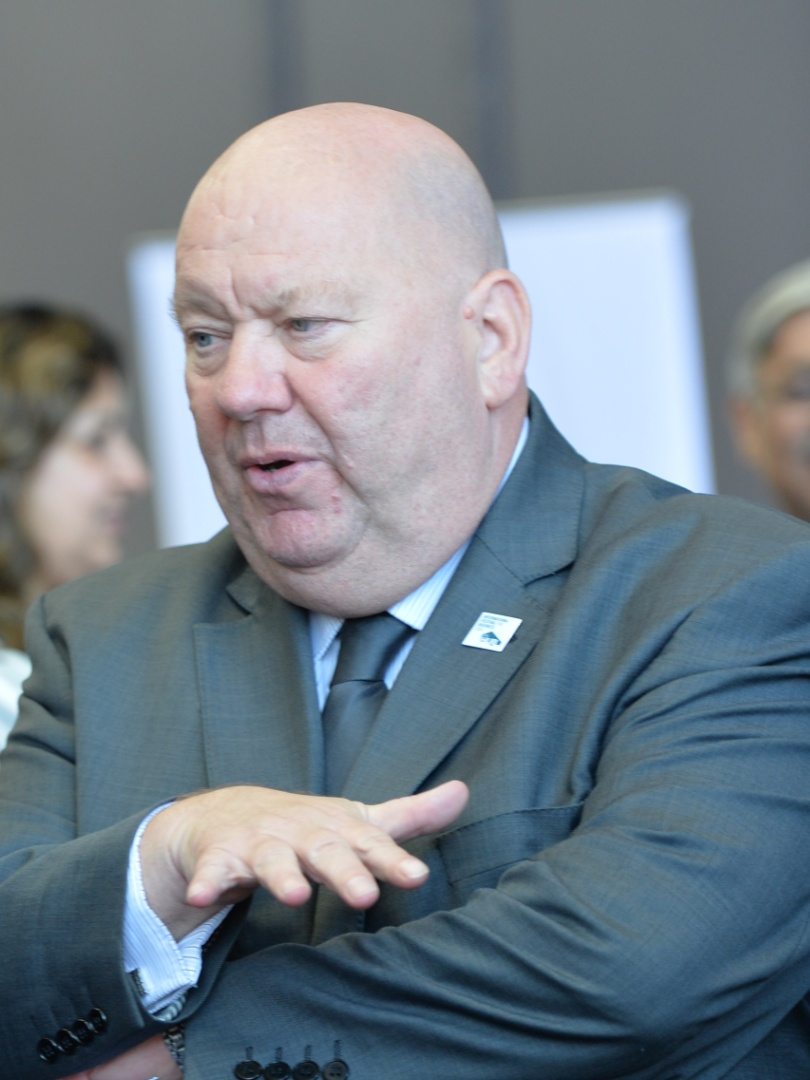
	First party	Second party	Third party
Leader	Warren Bradley	Joe Anderson
Party	Liberal Democrats	Labour	Liberal
Seat change	▼	▲
Percentage	%		%
Swing	▼%	▲%	▼%
	Fourth party
Party	Green
Percentage	%
Swing	▼%
Leader of Largest Party before election
Liberal Democrats
Subsequent Leader of Largest Party
Liberal Democrats

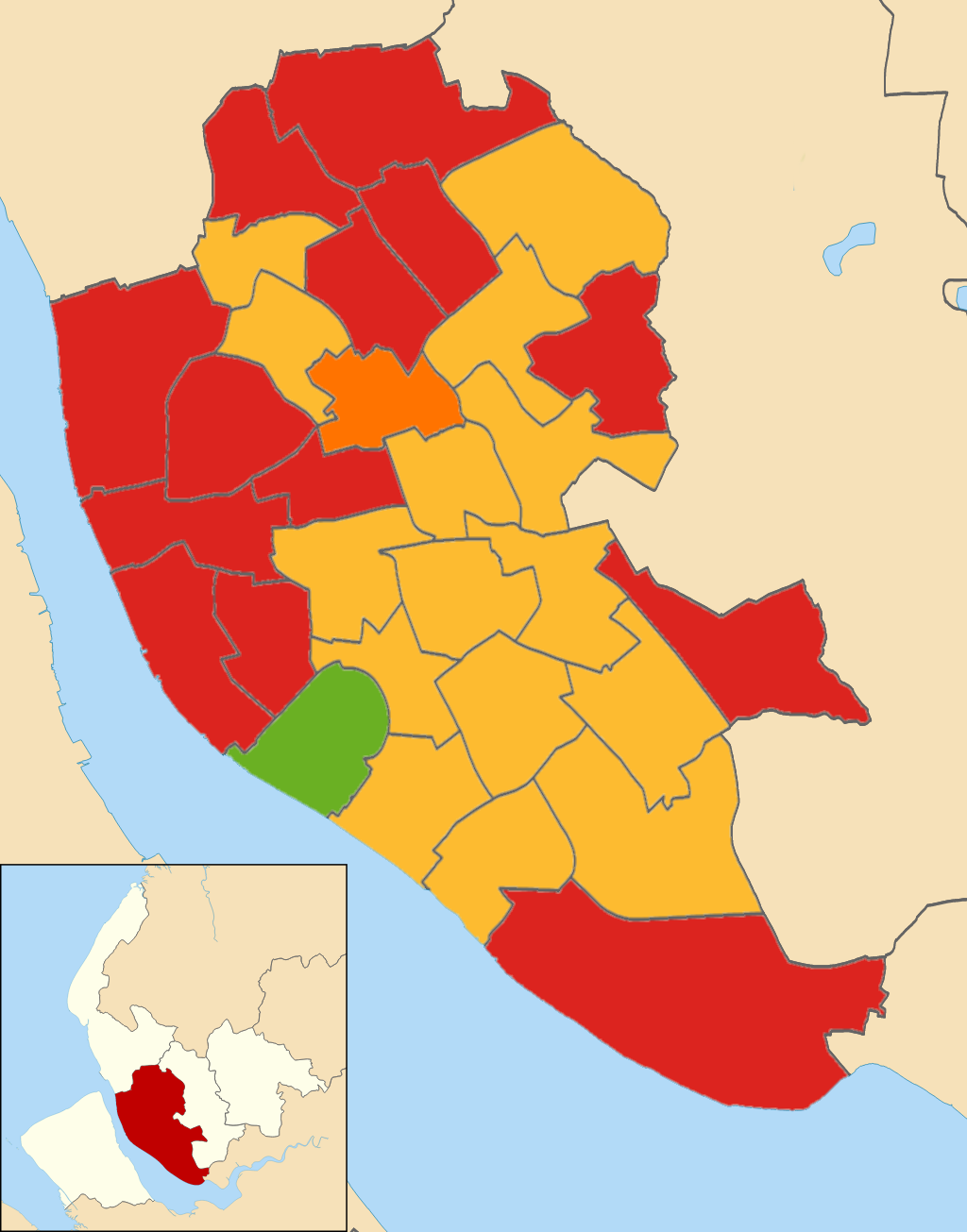
2007 local election results in Liverpool

Elections to Liverpool City Council were held on 3 May 2007. One third of the council was up for election and the Liberal Democrats kept overall control of the council. Overall turnout was 27.5%

After the election, the composition of the council was:

Party	Seats	±
Liberal Democrat	56	-6
Labour	30	+5
Liberal Party	3	0
Green	1	+1

== Election result ==
Liverpool local election result 2007
Party	Seats	Gains	Losses	Net gain/loss	Seats %	Votes %	Votes	+/−
Liberal Democrats	15	1	6	-5	50%	42.39	38,032	
Labour	13	5	1	+4	43%	36.48	32,727	
Conservative	0	0	0	0	0%	6.13	5,502	
Green	1	1	0	+1	3.3%	6.13	5,500	
Liberal	1	0	0	0	3.3%	6.09	5,465	
BNP	0	0	0	0	0%	1.86	1,667	
Independent	0	0	0	0	0%	0.56%	504	
UKIP	0	0	0	0	0%	0.13%	121	
Socialist Labour	0	0	0	0	0%	0.12%	111	
United Socialist	0	0	0	0	0%	0.09%	82	

== Ward results ==
=== Allerton and Hunts Cross ===
Allerton and Hunts Cross
Party	Candidate	Votes	%	±%
Liberal Democrats	John Clucas *	1,700	52.3%	−2%
Labour	Patrick John Devaney	661	20.4%	+5%
Conservative	Adam Ernest Marsden	587	18.1%	+6%
Green	Margaret Williams	165	5.1%	
Liberal	Christopher Hulme	135	4.2%	−2%
Majority		1,039		
Registered electors		10,878		
Turnout		3,248	29.86%	
Rejected ballots		6		
Liberal Democrats hold		Swing		

=== Anfield ===
Anfield
Party	Candidate	Votes	%	±%
Liberal Democrats	James Kendrick	1,324	49.6%	+6%
Labour	Brian Dowling	935	35%	+14%
Liberal	Dennis Gaskell	237	8.9%	−6%
Green	Kelly Rice	96	3.6%	
Conservative	Anthony Beilin	76	3.6%	
Majority		389		
Registered electors		10,300		
Turnout		2,668	25.9%	
Rejected ballots		5		
Liberal Democrats hold		Swing		

=== Belle Vale ===
Belle Vale
Party	Candidate	Votes	%	±%
Labour	Janet Kent	1,639	46.42%	+7%
Liberal Democrats	Ian Phillips *	1,505	42.62%	−4%
Conservative	Norman Coppell	118	3.34%	−1%
Liberal	Damien Patrick Daly	109	3.09%	
United Socialist	Paul Filby	82	2.32%	
Green	Andrea Pennington	78	2.21%	
Majority		134	3.80%	
Registered electors		11,003		
Turnout		3,531	32.09%	
Rejected ballots		8		
Labour gain from Liberal Democrats		Swing		

=== Central ===
Central
Party	Candidate	Votes	%	±%
Labour	Sharon Sullivan *	713	50.12%	−3%
Liberal Democrats	Gary Millar	432	30.42%	+1%
Green	Robert Smith	125	8.80%	+1%
Conservative	Mark Cotterell	120	8.45%	+3%
Liberal	Lisa Gaskell	30	2.11%	0%
Majority		281	19.79%	
Registered electors		12,032		
Turnout		1,420	11.80%	
Rejected ballots		4		
Labour hold		Swing		

=== Childwall ===
Childwall
Party	Candidate	Votes	%	±%
Liberal Democrats	Pamela Clein	1,928	53.69%	−24%
Labour	David Shepherd	635	17.68%	+3%
Conservative	Chris Lighten	445	12.39%	
Green	Faye Griffiths	186	5.18%	
Liberal	Philip Daley	125	3.48%	
Majority		1,293	36.01%	
Registered electors		11,097		
Turnout		3,591	32.36%	
Rejected ballots		3		
Liberal Democrats hold		Swing		

=== Church ===
Church
Party	Candidate	Votes	%	±%
Liberal Democrats	Richard Kemp *	2,790	69.77%	−1%
Labour	Stephen Bennett	461	11.53%	0%
Green	Eleanor Martin	329	8.23%	−6%
Conservative	Graham Jones	332	8.30%	
Liberal	James MacGregor	87	2.18%	
Majority		2,329	58.14%	
Registered electors		10,721		
Turnout		3,999	37.30%	
Rejected ballots		12		
Liberal Democrats hold		Swing		

=== Clubmoor ===
Clubmoor
Party	Candidate	Votes	%	±%
Labour	Irene Rainey *	1,366	48%	+6%
Liberal	David Maher	999	35%	+24%
BNP	Peter Squire	210	7.44%	
Conservative	Gwynneth Hicklin	147	5.21%	
Green	Jonathan Mercer	99	3.51%	
Majority		367	13.01%	
Registered electors		11,278		
Turnout		2'821	25.01%	
Rejected ballots				
Labour hold		Swing		

=== County ===
County
Party	Candidate	Votes	%	±%
Liberal Democrats	Karen Afford *	1,541	58.46%	+7%
Labour	Colin McAlley	859	32.59%	−8%
UKIP	Colin Windever	121	4.59%	
Conservative	Jennifer Kelly	62	2.35%	
Majority		682	25.87%	
Registered electors		10,325		
Turnout		2,636	25.53%	
Rejected ballots		10		
Liberal Democrats hold		Swing		

=== Cressington ===
Cressington
Party	Candidate	Votes	%	±%
Liberal Democrats	Peter Millea *	2,065	56.44%	+6%
Labour	Anna Briggs	643	17.57%	+2%
Conservative	Richard Michael Downey	383	10.47%	+2%
Independent	Alex Corina	316	8.64%	
Green	Richard De Pesando	166	4.54%	−6%
Liberal	John Moore	86	2.35%	−5%
Majority		1,422		
Registered electors		11,057		
Turnout		3,659	25%	
Rejected ballots		9		
Liberal Democrats hold		Swing		

=== Croxteth ===
Croxteth
Party	Candidate	Votes	%	±%
Liberal Democrats	Phil Moffatt	1,246	46%	+10%
Labour	Jim Noakes	1,236	45%	+7%
Green	Anne Graham	121	4%	0%
Conservative	Diane Westwell	90	3%	−2%
Liberal	Susan O'Brian	39	1%	−2%
Majority		10		
Registered electors		10,365		
Turnout		2,732	26%	
Rejected ballots		10		
Liberal Democrats gain from Labour		Swing		

=== Everton ===
Everton
Party	Candidate	Votes	%	±%
Labour	Jane Corbett *	1,675	76%	+11%
Liberal Democrats	Craig Crennell	233	11%	−5%
BNP	Jackie Stafford	154	7%	
Liberal	Linda Roberts	108	5%	−2%
Conservative	Matthew Sephton	104	5%	
Green	Adam Howarth	76	3%	−7%
Majority		1,442		
Registered electors		10,237		
Turnout		2,350	23%	
Rejected ballots				
Labour hold		Swing		

=== Fazakerley ===
Fazakerley
Party	Candidate	Votes	%	±%
Labour	Steve Rotheram *	1,814	57%	+10%
Liberal Democrats	Graham Seddon	1,159	37%	+2%
BNP	Peter Stafford	324	10%	
Conservative	Nigel Barber	77	2%	−6%
Green	Kim Graham	65	2%	
Liberal	Jane Canning	57	2%	−3%
Majority		655		
Registered electors		11,402		
Turnout		3,496	31%	
Rejected ballots		7		
Labour hold		Swing		

=== Greenbank ===
Greenbank
Party	Candidate	Votes	%	±%
Liberal Democrats	Paul Clein *	1,345	50.1%	−7%
Labour	Christopher Helm	635	23.6%	+5%
Green	Peter Cranie	458	17%	+3%
Conservative	Alma McGing	188	7%	0%
Liberal	Karen Williams	61	2.3%	
Majority		710		
Registered electors		10,425		
Turnout		2,687	25.8%	
Rejected ballots		6		
Liberal Democrats hold		Swing		

=== Kensington and Fairfield ===
Kensington and Fairfield
Party	Candidate	Votes	%	±%
Labour	Wendy Simon	1,289	46%	+13%
Liberal Democrats	Richard Marbrow *	1,237	44%	+3%
BNP	Jane Greehaigh	128	5%	
Green	Paula Rice	106	4%	
Conservative	John Watson	62	2%	−2%
Majority		52		
Registered electors		9,348		
Turnout		2,882	30%	
Rejected ballots		8		
Labour gain from Liberal Democrats		Swing		

=== Kirkdale ===
Kirkdale
Party	Candidate	Votes	%	±%
Labour	Pat Holleran *	1,927	85%	+11%
BNP	Steven Greenhaigh	169	7%	
Liberal Democrats	Tom Morrison	147	7%	−1%
Green	Natalie Awdry	84	3%	−1%
Conservative	Nichola Munro	66	3%	
Independent	Will Tomson	47	2%	
Liberal	Irene Mayes	37	2%	−2%
Majority		1,758		
Registered electors		11,357		
Turnout		2,477	22%	
Rejected ballots		4		
Labour hold		Swing		

=== Knotty Ash ===
Knotty Ash
Party	Candidate	Votes	%	±%
Liberal Democrats	Paul Twigger	1,794	51%	−2%
Labour	Anthony Concepcion	1,405	40%	+7%
Conservative	Michael Lind	114	3%	−3%
Liberal	Terry Formby	106	3%	−6%
Green	Helen Rawlinson	88	3%	
Majority		389		
Registered electors		10,120		
Turnout		3,507	35%	
Rejected ballots		7		
Liberal Democrats hold		Swing		

=== Mossley Hill ===
Mossley Hill
Party	Candidate	Votes	%	±%
Liberal Democrats	Ron Gould *	2,056	62%	+6%
Labour	Tristan Taylor	543	16%	−1%
Green	Sophy Hansford	348	11%	−2%
Conservative	Elizabeth Morton	266	8%	−1%
Liberal	David Wood	78	2%	
Majority		1,513		
Registered electors		10,335		
Turnout		3,291	32%	
Rejected ballots		9		
Liberal Democrats hold		Swing		

=== Norris Green ===
Norris Green
Party	Candidate	Votes	%	±%
Labour	Alan Walker *	1,552	63.6%	4.3
BNP	John Edgar	205	8.4%	−9.4%
Liberal Democrats	Christine Doyle	173	7.1%	−2.8%
Independent	Paul Breen	141	5.8%	
Conservative	Mark Rea	116	4.8%	0.7%
Socialist Labour	Kai Anderson	111	4.8%	
Liberal	Vera Phillips	86	3.5%	−0.7%
Green	Eric Cartmel	56	2.3%	−2.4%
Majority		664		
Registered electors		10,557		
Turnout		2,404	23.1%	2%
Rejected ballots		3		
Labour hold		Swing	3.6%	

=== Old Swan ===
Old Swan
Party	Candidate	Votes	%	±%
Liberal Democrats	Bernie Turner *	2,248	65%	+4%
Labour	Claire Wilner	814	23%	−6%
Liberal	Edith Bamford	161	5%	0%
Green	Paul Grimes	132	4%	
Conservative	Neil Wilson	127	4%	
Majority		1,434		
Registered electors		11,876		
Turnout		3,482	29%	
Rejected ballots		8		
Liberal Democrats hold		Swing		

=== Picton ===
Picton
Party	Candidate	Votes	%	±%
Liberal Democrats	Ian Jobling *	1,316	53.41%	−4%
Labour	Denis Dunphy	721	29.26%	−7%
Liberal	Griffith Parry	236	9.58%	
Green	Jean Hill	118	4.76%	
Conservative	Ann Temple	73	2.96%	
Majority		595		
Registered electors		10,720		
Turnout		2,464	23%	
Rejected ballots		6		
Liberal Democrats hold		Swing		

=== Princes Park ===
Princes Park
Party	Candidate	Votes	%	±%
Labour	Alan Dean *	1,193	53%	+13%
Liberal Democrats	Mohamed Ali	575	26%	−11%
Green	Thomas Crone	327	15%	0%
Liberal	Neil King	110	5%	
Conservative	Audrey Hirst	36	2%	−4%
Majority		618		
Registered electors		10,359		
Turnout		2,241	22%	
Rejected ballots		17		
Labour hold		Swing		

=== Riverside ===
Riverside
Party	Candidate	Votes	%	±%
Labour	Paul Brant *	1,678	69%	+10%
Liberal Democrats	Conor McDonald	252	10%	−16%
Conservative	Emlyn Williams	241	10%	+3%
Green	Jonathan Clatworthy	184	8%	+1%
Liberal	David O'Brien	63	3%	
Majority		1,426		
Registered electors		10,391		
Turnout		2,418	23%	
Rejected ballots		5		
Labour hold		Swing		

=== St. Michael's ===
St Michaels
Party	Candidate	Votes	%	±%
Green	John Coyne *	1,232	38.0%	+24%
Liberal Democrats	Christopher Curry	947	29.2%	−22%
Labour	Jack Johnson	839	25.9%	+2%
Conservative	David Patmore	149	4.6%	−3%
Liberal	George Roberts	75	2.3%	
Majority		285		
Registered electors		9,662		
Turnout		3,242	34%	
Rejected ballots		8		
Green gain from Liberal Democrats		Swing		

=== Speke-Garston ===
Speke-Garston
Party	Candidate	Votes	%	±%
Labour	Mary Rasmussen	1,859	57%	+19%
Liberal Democrats	Paula Keaveney *	990	30%	−28%
BNP	Steven McEllenborough	190	6%	
Conservative	Brenda Coppell	81	3%	
Green	Cherry Fitzsimmons	75	2%	
Liberal	John Pagan	59	2%	
Majority		869		
Registered electors		12,722		
Turnout		3,254	26%	
Rejected ballots		5		
Labour gain from Liberal Democrats		Swing		

=== Tuebrook and Stoneycroft ===
Tuebrook and Stoneycroft
Party	Candidate	Votes	%	±%
Liberal	Hazel Williams *	1,805	64%	+1%
Labour	Allen Hammond	564	21%	+4%
Liberal Democrats	Anton Minion	165	6%	−2%
BNP	Sharon Broadfoot	109	4%	
Green	Jennifer Brown	96	3%	
Conservative	Lauren Graham	76	3%	
Majority		1,241		
Registered electors		10,874		
Turnout		2,815	26%	
Rejected ballots		7		
Liberal hold		Swing		

=== Warbreck ===
Warbreck
Party	Candidate	Votes	%	±%
Labour	Ann O'Bryne	1,837	49%	+18%
Liberal Democrats	Richard Roberts *	1,643	44%	−17%
BNP	Carol Kilkelly	178	5%	
Conservative	Paul Barber	66	2%	
Green	Don Ross	50	1%	
Majority		194		
Registered electors		11,070		
Turnout		3,774	34%	
Rejected ballots		8		
Labour hold		Swing		

=== Wavertree ===
Wavertree
Party	Candidate	Votes	%	±%
Liberal Democrats	Mike Storey *	2,350	70.0	−12%
Labour	Timothy Beaumont	559	16.7%	+2%
Green	Julie Birch-Holt	219	6.5%	0%
Conservative	David Grundy	137	4.1%	
Liberal	Charles Mayes	90	2.7%	
Majority		1,791		
Registered electors		10,451		
Turnout		3,355	32.1%	
Rejected ballots		11		
Liberal Democrats hold		Swing		

=== West Derby ===
West Derby
Party	Candidate	Votes	%	±%
Liberal Democrats	Norman Mills *	1,751	55%	−7%
Labour	Ged Taylor	758	24%	+4%
Conservative	Geoffrey Brandwood	261	8%	−2%
Liberal	Patricia Elmour	209	7%	
Green	Ian Graham	181	6%	
Majority		993		
Registered electors		11,157		
Turnout		3,160	28%	
Rejected ballots		11		
Liberal Democrats hold		Swing		

=== Woolton ===
Woolton
Party	Candidate	Votes	%	±%
Liberal Democrats	Barbara Mace *	2,019	57%	−14%
Conservative	Stephen Fitzsimmons	742	21%	+8%
Labour	Laurence Freeman	491	14%	+1%
Green	Alexander Rudkin	149	4%	
Liberal	Maria Langley	121	3%	
Majority		1,528		
Registered electors		10,446		
Turnout		3,522	34%	
Rejected ballots		8		
Liberal Democrats hold		Swing		

=== Yew Tree ===
Yew Tree
Party	Candidate	Votes	%	±%
Labour	Barbara Murray	1,426	49%	+14%
Liberal Democrats	Graham Hulme	1,101	38%	−9%
Conservative	June Brandwood	160	5%	−2%
Liberal	Sam Hawksford	156	5%	−2%
Green	Stephen Clatworthy	91	3.1%	
Majority		325		
Registered electors		11,159		
Turnout		2,934	26.3%	
Rejected ballots		8		
Labour gain from Liberal Democrats		Swing		

== By Elections ==
=== Warbreck, 13 September 2007 ===
Caused by the death of Councillor Joan Lang (Liberal Democrat, Warbreck, elected 10 June 2004).

Warbreck By-Election 13 September 2007
Party	Candidate	Votes	%	±%
Labour	Richard McLinden	1,796	55.2%	+10.9%
Liberal Democrats	Ritchie Roberts	1,024	31.4%	−13.8%
BNP	Peter Stafford	136	4.2%	+4.2%
Independent	Michael Langen	131	4.0%	+4.0%
UKIP	Joseph Moran	52	1.6%	+1.6%
Green	Kim Graham	45	1.4%	+1.4%
Conservative	Mark Rea	40	1.2%	−3.2%
Liverpool Labour Community Party	Alfie Hincks	32	1.0%	+1.0%
Majority		772	23.8%	
Turnout		3,256	29.4%	
Labour gain from Liberal Democrats		Swing		
