= Mike Storey =

British Liberal Democrat politician and life peer

The Right Honourable The Lord Storey CBE
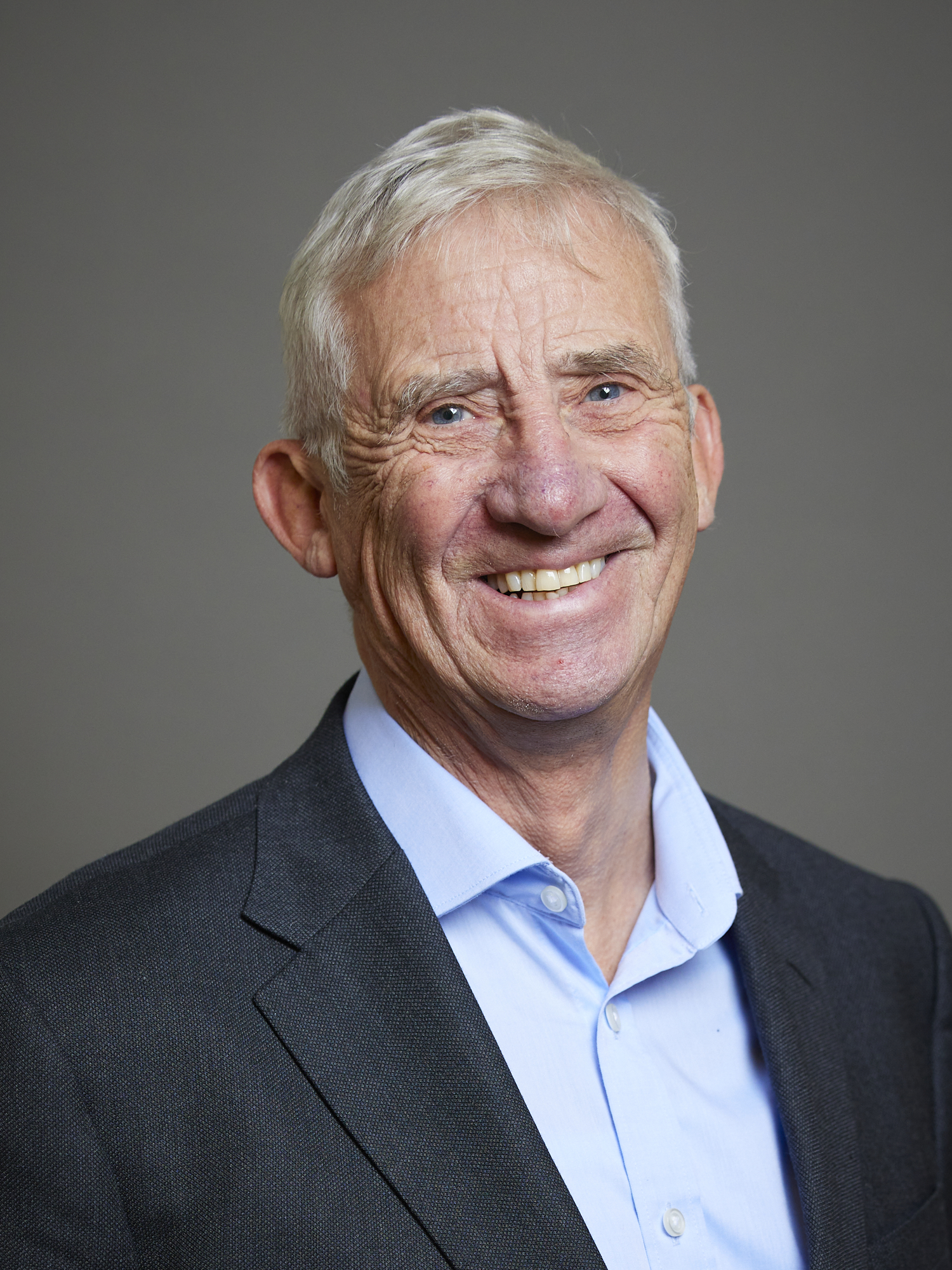
- Official portrait, 2022

Co-Deputy Leader of the Liberal Democrats in the House of Lords
- Incumbent
- Assumed office 9 September 2025 Serving with Baroness Pinnock
- Leader: Lord Purvis of Tweed

Member of the House of Lords
- Lord Temporal
- Life peerage 2 February 2011

Liverpool City Councillor for Childwall
- Incumbent
- Assumed office 4 May 2023
- Preceded by: Carole Storey
- Majority: 1,197 (17.5%)

Lord Mayor of Liverpool
- In office 7 May 2009 – 25 May 2010
- Preceded by: Steve Rotheram
- Succeeded by: Hazel Williams

Leader of Liverpool City Council
- In office 7 May 1998 – 25 November 2005
- Preceded by: Frank Prendergast
- Succeeded by: Warren Bradley

Liberal Democrat Group Leader on Liverpool City Council
- In office 2 May 1991 – 25 November 2005
- Preceded by: Trevor Jones
- Succeeded by: Warren Bradley
Previous council seats
2004–2011	Liverpool City Councillor for Wavertree
1984–2004	Liverpool City Councillor for Church
1973–1984	Liverpool City Councillor for Clubmoor

Personal details
- Born: Michael John Storey; 25 May 1949 (age 77) Liverpool, England
- Party: Liberal Democrats
- Spouse: Carole Storey
- Education: Quarry Bank High School
- Alma mater: St Katharine's College, Liverpool (now Liverpool Hope University)

Michael John Storey, Baron Storey, CBE (born 25 May 1949) is a British Liberal Democrat politician.

He is co-deputy leader of the Liberal Democrats in the House of Lords, and was the party's education spokesperson in the Lords between 2015–2025.

Storey has been a Liverpool city councillor for Childwall since May 2023, and previously represented Wavertree (2004–2011), Church (1984–2004) and Clubmoor (1973–1984).

First elected to the council in 1973, he became the youngest chair of education in Liverpool council's history between 1980–1983, during which time he was deputy leader of the council under Trevor Jones.

Storey was leader of Liverpool City Council from 1998–2005 and Liverpool's 111th Lord Mayor between 2009–2010.

== Leader of the Council ==
In 1998, the Liverpool Liberal Democrats gained control of Liverpool City Council and Storey became council leader, with Flo Clucas as deputy leader.

At the time, the council was ranked the third worst in England for service delivery, with a council tax some 20% higher than the next-highest authority. Storey aimed to set about rebuilding the city's reputation, cutting council tax, improving services and attracting jobs and investment – while reducing the number of council employees by 5,000.

He was a central part of Liverpool's successful bid to become European Capital of Culture in 2008, and was widely credited with transforming the city and the council's reputation, attracting jobs and investment in the process.

During Storey's leadership, the city's education department went from one of the UK's lowest-performing to the most improved local education authority through measures such as increasing per-pupil spending above the national average and implementing an extensive school building programme.

He led the council when it was granted UNESCO World Heritage status in 2004 as a maritime mercantile city. In June 2021, Storey described the city's delisting as a "tremendous blow" to Liverpool's economy.

As leader, Storey pledged in October 2004 to make Liverpool the UK's first smoke-free city, petitioning Parliament for a local act banning smoking in enclosed workplaces, a campaign that preceded a national smoking ban introduced in 2007.

In 2005, following a unanimous vote by councillors, Storey issued an apology for the 1965 flooding of the Tryweryn Valley, and the destruction of the Welsh-speaking community of Capel Celyn, to create a reservoir for Liverpool. He said: "For any insensitivity by our predecessor council, we apologise, and hope that the sound relationship between Liverpool and Wales can be completely restored".

Storey resigned as council leader in November 2005 after being found to have breached the members' code of conduct following the disclosure of correspondence with former council media chief, Matt Finnegan, which appeared to show the two men seeking to pressure the departure of then chief executive, David Henshaw. Storey's successor as leader was Warren Bradley.

Storey lost his Wavertree seat to 18-year-old Jake Morrison in 2011. He was later elected to represent Childwall in May 2023, and holds the Liverpool Liberal Democrats' education and children's social services portfolio. He chaired the council's education, skills and employment scrutiny committee until March 2026.

== Lord Mayor ==
Storey was Lord Mayor of Liverpool between 2009–2010. He was preceded by Steve Rotheram and succeeded by Hazel Williams in that ceremonial role.

In July 2009, he was present, as Lord Mayor, at a ceremony organised by Sons of Confederate Veterans (allegedly a Neo-Confederate organisation) at a Toxteth Park Cemetery rededicating the grave of Irvine Bulloch. Storey told CNN that, had he "known what the event was really about [he] certainly would not have attended".

In December 2009, Storey presented Liverpool's honorary citizen scroll to Bill Shankly's grand-daughter, Karen Gill (together with three generations of the Shankly family) on the 50th anniversary of Shankly arriving in the city to take over as manager of Liverpool FC.

In March 2010, he announced a two-month cultural season of music and art to celebrate the life, music and "enduring message of peace" of John Lennon on what would have been Lennon's 70th birthday.

During his tenure as Lord Mayor, Storey visited Wallasey Town Hall in March 2010 to view a portrait of his great-grandfather, Francis Storey, who had served as mayor of Wallasey from 1912–13.

== House of Lords ==
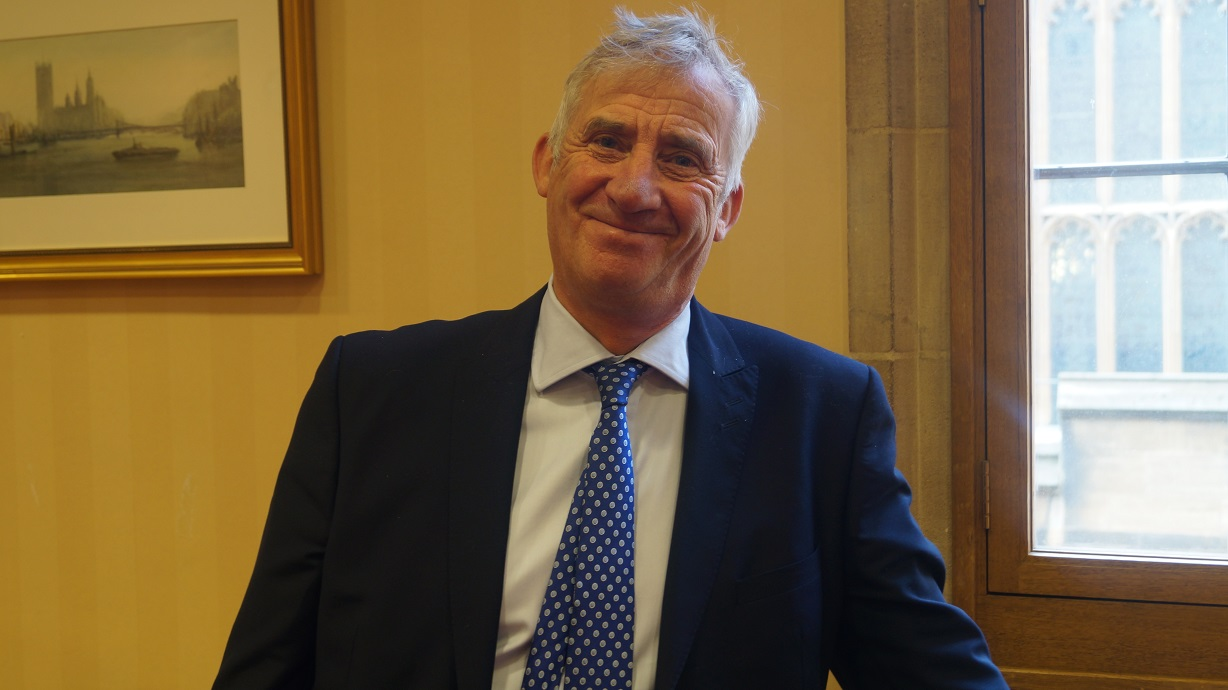
Lord Storey CBE in the House of Lords, February 2015

On 19 November 2010, it was announced that Storey would be created a life peer and sit as a Liberal Democrat in the House of Lords. He was created Baron Storey, of Childwall in the City of Liverpool, on 2 February 2011.

Storey focuses on education, social mobility, regeneration matters, with a specific interest in North West England and international relations with Europe and the USA.

In his March 2011 maiden speech, he advocated for early intervention strategies in child development, emphasising the critical role of parental support, the value of maintaining Sure Start centres, and the effective use of the pupil premium to assist vulnerable children.

=== Offices ===
Storey was elected co-deputy leader of the Liberal Democrats in the House of Lords, to serve alongside Kath Pinnock, on 9 September 2025. Previously, he was the Liberal Democrat spokesperson for young people (under Vince Cable's leadership), its education spokesman in the Lords, co-chair of its education, families and young people committee, and a party whip.

Storey sits on the House of Lords Liaison Committee and Communications and Digital Committee (of which he was also a member between 2019–2021). In earlier sessions, he was a member of the Small and Medium Sized Enterprises Committee (2012–2013), Youth Unemployment Committee (2021), Children and Families Act 2014 Committee (2022) and Education for 11-16 Year Olds Committee (2023).

=== Legislation ===
Storey's legislative record includes a successful amendment to the Technical and Further Education Act 2017 requiring Ofsted to comment on careers guidance provided to students under-19 during further education institution inspections, which came into force on 2 January 2018.

In January 2026, he defeated the government (233–162) on a motion requiring a review of the Adoption and Special Guardianship Support Fund. The Department for Education subsequently increased the fund's budget by 10% to £55 million for 2026–27 and confirmed its continuation until 2028, though it declined to reverse cuts to the per-child therapy funding cap.

Storey's July 2022 proposal to extend free school meals to all children in Universal Credit households was rejected (106–49), but the policy was adopted by the government in June 2025, and announced for implementation from September 2026, with the Department for Work and Pensions estimating it would lift 100,000 children out of relative poverty by 2030.

His January 2026 amendment to the Children's Wellbeing and Schools Bill proposing a harms-based minimum age framework for children's social media access was defeated 189–65. The government subsequently launched a consultation on children's social media use in March 2026 exploring similar targeted approaches, with legislation expected by late 2026.

Storey has introduced several education-focused private members' bills, including proposals to ban essay mills, add water safety to the curriculum, and regulate home education through registration and support. His essay mill proposal helped lead to a ban in the Skills and Post-16 Education Act 2022, while his other bills informed debates on curriculum content and home education oversight.

=== APPGs ===
He co-chairs the Water Safety Education APPG, is an officer of the Education and Social Mobility APPGs, and a member of the APPGs on the Liverpool City Region, apprenticeships, further education, cities, smoking and health, and schools.

== Other roles ==
Storey is vice president of the Local Government Association and patron of Careers Connect, (the visitor attraction) Strawberry Field and the Royal Life Saving Society.

Earlier, he was deputy chair of (the UK's first urban regeneration company) Liverpool Vision (1999–2005), a board member of the North West Development Agency (1999–2006), deputy chair of Liverpool's Capital of Culture Board (2003–2008) and an advisory panel member of the Regional Growth Fund (2011–2015), chaired by Lord Heseltine.

== Awards ==
Storey was appointed an OBE for political and public service in 1994, and appointed a CBE for services to regeneration in 2002.

== Earlier career ==
Storey was educated at Quarry Bank High School and graduated from St Katharine's College (now Liverpool Hope University) with a certificate of education in 1971.

He is a retired primary school teacher. He taught, and was deputy head, at several Merseyside schools before holding headships at St Gabriel's Primary School, Huyton (1985–1990) and Plantation Primary School, Halewood (1990–2012).

Political offices
Preceded by Frank Prendergast	Leader of Liverpool City Council; 1998–2005	Succeeded by Warren Bradley
Orders of precedence in the United Kingdom
Preceded by The Lord Gold	Gentlemen; Baron Storey	Followed by The Lord Stephen
