= Childwall (Liverpool ward) =

Metropolitan borough council ward in Liverpool, England

Coordinates: 53°24′12.8″N 2°53′43.4″W

- Childwall ward within Liverpool
- Population: 12,258 (2021 census)
- Registered electors: 6,827 (2023 elections)
- Metropolitan borough: City of Liverpool
- Metropolitan county: Merseyside
- Region: North West
- Country: England
- Sovereign state: United Kingdom
- UK Parliament: Liverpool Wavertree
- Councillors: Mike Storey (Liberal Democrat); Pat Moloney (Liberal Democrat)

Childwall ward is an electoral district of Liverpool City Council within the Liverpool Wavertree Parliamentary constituency.

== Background ==
The ward was created in 1920 and the ward boundaries were changed in 1953, 1973, 1980, 2004 and 2023.

=== 1980 boundaries ===
1980 ward boundaries

A report of the Local Government Boundary Commission for England published in November 1978 set out proposals for changes to the wards of Liverpool City Council, maintaining the number of councillors at 99 representing 33 wards. Childwall ward was represented by three councillors.

The report describes the boundaries as "Commencing at a point where Childwall Park Avenue meets Woolton Road, thence northwestwards along said road and continuing generally northwestwards along the northeastern boundary of Church Ward to the eastern boundary of Old Swan Ward thence northwards along said boundary to the southern boundary of Broadgreen Ward, thence generally eastwards along said boundary to the eastern boundary of the City, thence southeastwards along said boundary to Bowring Park Road, thence westwards along said road to the West Derby - Hunt's Cross railway, thence southeastwards along said railway to Well Lane, thence southwestwards along said lane to Childwall Lane, thence southeastwards along said lane to the southeastern boundary of the Childwall Hall County College playing fields, thence southwestwards along said boundary to the eastern boundary of Childwall Woods, thence southwards along said boundary and northwestwards and southwestwards along the southern boundary of said woods to Woolton Road, thence northwestwards along said road to the point of commencement".

=== 2004 boundaries ===
2004 ward boundaries

The ward boundary was changed at the 2004 municipal elections to take in a small part of the former Valley ward and losing part to the new Wavertree ward.

The population of the ward at the 2011 census was 13,098.

=== 2023 boundaries ===
The ward boundary was changed at the 2023 municipal elections following a 2022 review by the Local Government Boundary Commission for England which decided that the 30 wards established in 2004, each represented by three Councillors, should be replaced by 64 wards represented by 85 councillors with varying representation by one, two or three councillors per ward. Childwall ward was to be represented by two councillors and the ward boundaries were extended slightly to the east taking in part of the former Belle Vale ward, and lost area in the west to the new Wavertree Garden Suburb ward.

The ward boundaries follow the Liverpool and Manchester Railway, behind Thornton Road, including St Pachel Baylon Primary School, Childwall Valley Road, Score Lane, Childwall Lane, the southern boundary of Childwall Woods, Woolton Road, and Queens Drive. The ward includes the Liverpool Hope University Hope Park campus.

The population of the ward at the 2021 census was 12,258.

== Councillors ==
Election	Councillor	Councillor	Councillor
2004	Sir Trevor Jones (LD)	Doreen Jones (LD)	Edwin Clein (LD)
2006	Sir Trevor Jones (LD)	Doreen Jones (LD)	Edwin Clein (LD)
2007	Sir Trevor Jones (LD)	Pamela Clein (LD)	Edwin Clein (LD)
2008	Sir Trevor Jones (LD)	Pamela Clein (LD)	Edwin Clein (LD)
2010	Pat Moloney (LD)	Pamela Clein (LD)	Edwin Clein (LD)
2011	Pat Moloney (LD)	Jeremy Wolfson (Lab)	Edwin Clein (LD)
2012	Pat Moloney (LD)	Jeremy Wolfson (Lab)	Ruth Hirschfield (Lab)
2014	Frank Hont (Lab)	Jeremy Wolfson (Lab)	Ruth Hirschfield (Lab)
2015	Frank Hont (Lab)	Jeremy Wolfson (Lab)	Ruth Hirschfield (Lab)
2016	Frank Hont (Lab)	Jeremy Wolfson (Lab)	Liz Parsons (Lab)
2018	Carole Storey (LD)	Jeremy Wolfson (Lab)	Liz Parsons (Lab)
2019	Carole Storey (LD)	Alan Tormey (LD)	Liz Parsons (Lab)
2021	Carole Storey (LD)	Alan Tormey (LD)	Pat Moloney (LD)
WARD REFORMED
2023	Mike Storey (LD)	Pat Moloney (LD)	

indicates seat up for re-election after boundary changes.

indicates seat up for re-election.

indicates change in affiliation.

indicates seat up for re-election after casual vacancy.

== Election results ==
=== Elections of the 2020s ===
4th May 2023
Party	Candidate	Votes	%	±%
Liberal Democrats	Mike Storey	2,193	32.12	
Liberal Democrats	Pat Moloney (Note: Pat Moloney was a re-standing councillor for the former Childwall ward.)	2,138	32.12	
Labour	Brenda Anne McGrath	996	14.59	
Labour	Matthew James Smyth (Note: Matthew Smyth was a re-standing councillor for the former Clubmoor ward.)	838	12.27	
Green	John Bernard Cowan Coyne	352	5.16	
Independent	Sharon Lesley Cross	206	3.02	
Conservative	Wendy Rose Hine	104	1.52	
Majority		1,197		
Turnout		3,414	35.30	
Rejected ballots		14		
Total ballots		6,827		
Registered electors		9,671		
Liberal Democrats win (new seat)				
Liberal Democrats win (new seat)				

Liverpool City Council Municipal Elections 2021: 6th May 2021
Party	Candidate	Votes	%	±%
Liberal Democrats	Pat Moloney	2,329	54.68%	▲2.27
Labour	Betsan Evans	1,173	27.54%	▼11.00
Green	Helen Alexandra Parker-Jervis	356	8.36%	▲2.90
Conservative	James Kenton Craig	207	4.86%	▲2.90
Liberal	Jonathan Mason	194	4.56%	N/A
Majority		1,156	27.14%	▲13.26
Turnout		4,321	39.87	▼3.07
Registered electors		10,838		
Rejected ballots		62	1.43%	▲1.19
Liberal Democrats gain from Labour		Swing	6.64	

=== Elections of the 2010s ===
Liverpool City Council Municipal Elections 2019: 2nd May 2019
Party	Candidate	Votes	%	±%
Liberal Democrats	Alan Peter Tormey	2,421	52.41%	▲3.79
Labour	Jeremy Wolfson	1,780	38.54%	▼4.69
Green	David Ronald Teasdale	252	5.46%	▲1.50
Conservative	David Jeffery	109	2.36%	▼0.95
Women's Equality	Erika Lesley Raffle-Currie	57	1.23%	N/A
Majority		641	13.88%	▲8.49
Registered electors		10,807		
Turnout		4,641	42.94	▲0.94
Rejected ballots		11	0.24%	▼1.1
Liberal Democrats gain from Labour		Swing	4.24%	

Liverpool City Council Municipal Elections 2018: 3rd May 2018
Party	Candidate	Votes	%	±%
Liberal Democrats	Carole Storey	2,200	48.62%	▲19.46
Labour	Frank Hont	1,956	43.23	▼9.47
Green	Phil Williamson	179	3.96	▼2.50
Conservative	David Jeffery	150	3.31	▼1.31
Liberal	Lindsey Wood	40	0.88	N/A
Majority		244	5.39	▼28.15
Registered electors		10,804		
Turnout		4,536	42.0	▲2.6
Rejected ballots		11	0.24%	▼1.1
Liberal Democrats gain from Labour		Swing	14.47	

Liverpool City Council Municipal Elections 2016: 5th May 2016
Party	Candidate	Votes	%	±%
Labour	Liz Parsons	2,234	52.70	▼3.04
Liberal Democrats	Pat Moloney	1,236	29.16	▲12.77
UKIP	Shimrit Manning	299	7.05	▼1.96
Green	Lewis Coyne	274	6.46	▼1.20
Conservative	Maria Elaine Prayle	196	4.62	▼4.31
Majority		998	33.54	▼5.81
Registered electors		10,885		
Turnout		4,294	39.45	▼33.34
Labour hold		Swing	-7.91	

Liverpool City Council Municipal Elections 2015: 7th May 2015
Party	Candidate	Votes	%	±%
Labour	Jeremy Wolfson	4,425	55.74	▲10.64
Liberal Democrats	Pat Moloney	1,301	16.39	▼10.16
UKIP	Shimrit Manning	715	9.01	▼6.23
Conservative	Maria Elaine Prayle	709	8.93	▲3.56
Green	Josie Mullen	608	7.66	▲2.33
TUSC	David Edwards	180	2.27	N/A
Majority		3,124	39.35	▲20.80
Registered electors		10,961		
Turnout		7,979	72.79	▲37.57
Labour hold		Swing	+10.30	

Liverpool City Council Municipal Elections 2014: 22nd May 2014
Party	Candidate	Votes	%	±%
Labour	Frank Hont	1,755	45.10	▼6.38
Liberal Democrats	Pat Moloney	1033	26.55	▼6.45
UKIP	Adam Heatherington	593	15.24	▲8.98
Green	Rebecca Lawson	215	5.53	▲1.99
Conservative	Elizabeth Ann Pearson	209	5.37	▲0.87
Liberal	Jonathan Mason	86	2.21	▲0.99
Majority		722	18.56	▲0.08
Turnout		3,891	35.22	▼2.58
Labour gain from Liberal Democrats		Swing	+0.04	

Liverpool City Council Municipal Elections 2012: 3rd May 2012
Party	Candidate	Votes	%	±%
Labour	Ruth Hirschfield	2,153	51.48	▼3.62
Liberal Democrats	Eddie Clein	1,380	33.00	▲2.06
UKIP	Adam Heatherington	262	6.26	N/A
Conservative	Arron Poole	188	4.5	▼4.70
Green	Pierre Laurent Jean Vandervorst	148	3.54	▲0.28
Liberal	Liam Francis Canning	51	1.22	▼0.28
Majority		773	18.48	▼5.68
Turnout		4,182	37.8	▼5.10
Labour gain from Liberal Democrats		Swing	-2.84	

Liverpool City Council Municipal Elections 2011: 5th May 2011
Party	Candidate	Votes	%	±%
Labour	Jeremy George Wolfson	2,616	55.10	▲12.84
Liberal Democrats	Pamela Clein	1,469	30.94	▼7.82
Conservative	James Andrew Rogers	437	9.20	▲0.37
Green	Pierre Laurent Jean Vandervorst	155	3.26	▼0.29
Liberal	Andrew Sharkey	71	1.50	▼5.68
Majority		1,147	24.16	▲20.66
Turnout		4748	42.90	−24.41
Labour gain from Liberal Democrats		Swing	+10.33	

Liverpool City Council Municipal Elections 2010: Childwall
Party	Candidate	Votes	%	±%
Liberal Democrats	Pat Moloney	3,162	42.26	▼13.25
Labour	Rosemary Connell	2,900	38.76	▲18.26
Conservative	Jade Louise Adamowicz	661	8.83	▼5.30
Liberal	Philip Daley	537	7.18	▲3.14
Green	Pierre Vandervorst	222	2.97	▼2.85
Majority		262	3.50	▼31.51
Turnout		7482	67.31	▲36.02
Liberal Democrats hold		Swing	-15.75	

=== Elections of the 2000s ===
Liverpool City Council Municipal Elections 2008: Childwall
Party	Candidate	Votes	%	±%
Liberal Democrats	Eddie Clein	1,925	55.51	▲1.82
Labour	Peter Dowling	711	20.50	▲2.82
Conservative	Chris Lighten	490	14.13	▲1.74
Green	Geoff Bunn	202	5.82	▲0.64
Liberal	Philip Daley	140	4.04	▲0.56
Majority		1,214	35.01	▼1.00
Turnout		3,468	31.29	▼1.07
Liberal Democrats hold		Swing	-0.50	

Liverpool City Council Municipal Elections 2007: Childwall
Party	Candidate	Votes	%	±%
Liberal Democrats	Pamela Clein	1,928	53.69	▼8.19
Labour	David Shepherd	635	17.68	▼1.95
Conservative	Chris Lighten	445	12.39	▲3.66
UKIP	Mark Eric Bill	272	7.57	N/A
Green	Faye Griffiths	186	5.18	▼2.01
Liberal	Philip Daley	125	3.48	▲0.90
Majority		1,293	36.01	▼6.24
Turnout		3,591	32.36	▲2.61
Liberal Democrats hold		Swing	-3.12	

Liverpool City Council Municipal Elections 2006: Childwall
Party	Candidate	Votes	%	±%
Liberal Democrats	Sir Trevor Jones	2,084	61.88	
Labour	Janet Kent	661	19.63	
Conservative	June Hilda Brandwood	294	8.73	
Green	Faye Griffiths	242	7.19	
Liberal	Francis Porter	87	2.58	
Majority		1,423	42.25	
Turnout		3,368	29.75	
Liberal Democrats hold		Swing		

After the boundary change of 2004 the whole of Liverpool City Council faced election. Three Councillors were returned.

Liverpool City Council Municipal Elections 2004: Childwall
Party	Candidate	Votes	%	±%
Liberal Democrats	Edwin Clein (Note: elected to a four-year term)	3,418		
Liberal Democrats	Doreen Jones (Note: elected to a three-year term)	3,306		
Liberal Democrats	Trevor Jones (Note: elected to a two-year term)	3,121		
Labour	Frank Hont	831		
Labour	David Minahan	624		
Labour	William Owen	580		
Green	Anne Saunders	534		
Majority				
Turnout		4,665	42.35	
Liberal Democrats win (new seat)				
Liberal Democrats win (new seat)				
Liberal Democrats win (new seat)				

italics - Denotes sitting Councillor.
