= Warren Ives Bradley =

American writer

Warren Ives Bradley (March 27, 1847 – June 15, 1868) was an American children's author who wrote as Glance Gaylord. He was born in Bristol, Connecticut, and died there aged 21. Despite his early death, he had written fifteen books, and numerous articles for papers and magazines.

His papers are at the Sterling Memorial Library, Yale.

== Bibliography ==
1. Boys at Dr. Murray's (Boston, 1866)
2. Gilbert Starr and his Lessons (1866)
3. Uncle Downes' home : the boys & girls at Donaldton (1866)
4. Miss Howard's school (1866)
5. Culm Rock, the Story of a Year (1867)
6. Gay Cottage (1867)
7. Gilbert's Last Summer at Rainsford, and what it Taught (1867)
8. Will Rood's Friendship (1867);
9. After years, a sequel to Culm Rock (1868)
10. Donald Deane and his Cross (1868)
11. Jack Abercrombe; the Story of a Waif (1868)
12. Miss Patience Hathaway; her friends and her enemies, and how she returned them good for evil (1868)
13. Mr. Pendleton's Cup (1869)
14. Bright nook, or, Aunt Maggie's corner (uncertain)
