= Wavertree (ward) =

Former metropolitan borough council ward in Liverpool, England

Coordinates: 53.3974°N 2.922°W

- Wavertree ward (2004) within Liverpool
- Area: 2.853 km^{2} (1.102 sq mi)
- Population: 14,262 (2021 census)
  - Density: 4,999/km^{2} (12,950/sq mi)
- Registered Electors: 10,550 (2021 election)
- Metropolitan borough: City of Liverpool
- Metropolitan county: Merseyside
- Region: North West
- Country: England
- Sovereign state: United Kingdom
- UK Parliament: Liverpool Wavertree

Wavertree ward was an electoral division of Liverpool City Council centred on the Wavertree district of Liverpool.

== Background ==
The ward was first established in 1895 before being dissolved in 1953, it was recreated in 2004 and dissolved again in 2023.

=== 2004 boundaries ===
A review by the Boundary Committee for England recommended that the council was formed of a reduced number of 90 members elected from 30 wards. The ward was created from parts of the former Childwall, Church, and Picton wards. The ward was part of the Liverpool Wavertree Parliamentary constituency.

The ward boundaries followed the Liverpool to Manchester railway line, Northway, Thingwall Road, Queens Drive, Woolton Road, Heathfield Road, Smithdown Road, and the West Coast Main Line.

The ward contained the Liverpool Blue Coat School, Childwall Sports and Science Academy, and Wavertree Playground.

The population of the ward taken at the 2021 Census was 14,262.

== Councillors ==
Election	Councillor	Councillor	Councillor
2004	Steve Hurst (LD)	Mike Storey (LD)	Warren Bradley (LD)
2006	Steve Hurst (LD)	Mike Storey (LD)	Warren Bradley (LD)
2007	Steve Hurst (LD)	Mike Storey (LD)	Warren Bradley (LD)
2008	Steve Hurst (LD)	Mike Storey (LD)	Warren Bradley (LD)
2010	Rosie Jolly (LD)	Mike Storey (LD)	Warren Bradley (LD)
2011	Rosie Jolly (LD)	Jake Morrison (Lab)	Warren Bradley (Ind.)^{[a]}
2012	Rosie Jolly (LD)	Jake Morrison (Lab)	Helen Casstles (Lab)
2013	Rosie Jolly (Lab)^{[b]}	Jake Morrison (Ind.)^{[c]}	Helen Casstles (Lab)
2014	Rosie Jolly (Lab)	Jake Morrison (Ind.)	Helen Casstles (Lab)
2015	Rosie Jolly (Lab)	David Cummings (Lab)	Helen Casstles (Lab)
2016	Rosie Jolly (Lab)	David Cummings (Lab)	Helen Casstles (Lab)
2017	Rosie Jolly (Lab)	David Cummings (Lab)	Clare McIntyre (Lab)^{[d]}
2018	Angela Coleman (Lab)	David Cummings (Lab)	Clare McIntyre (Lab)
2019	Angela Coleman (Lab)	David Cummings (Lab)	Clare McIntyre (Lab)
2021	Angela Coleman (Lab)	David Cummings (Lab)	Clare McIntyre (Lab)
2022	Angela Coleman (Lab)	David Cummings (Ind)^{[e]}	Clare McIntyre (Lab)

indicates seat up for re-election after boundary changes.

indicates seat up for re-election.

indicates change in affiliation.

indicates seat up for re-election after casual vacancy.

=== Notes ===
a. Cllr Warren Bradley (elected as Liberal Democrat, 2008) was suspended and eventually expelled from the Liberal Democrats following allegations of electoral fraud which he later admitted in Court, he unsuccessfully contested the 2012 elections as an Independent.

b. Cllr Rosie Jolly (elected as Liberal Democrat, 2010) defected to the Labour Party in May 2013 and successfully defended her seat in 2014.

c. Cllr Jake Morrison (elected as Labour, 2010) resigned his membership of the Labour Party in June 2013, due to internal disputes with the local Labour MP and disillusionment with national Labour policies.

d. Cllr Helen Casstles (Labour, 2016) resigned from the council in April 2017 citing conflicting work commitments.

e. Cllr David Cummings (elected as Labour, 2019) was suspended from the Labour whip in 2019 before being expelled from the Labour Party in 2022, following a string of complaints of abuse and receiving two criminal convictions.

== Election results ==
Bold - Denotes the winning candidate. italics - Denotes a re-standing councillor.

=== Elections of the 2020s ===
Thursday 6 May 2021
Party	Candidate	Votes	%	±%
**Labour**	**Clare McIntyre**	**1,579**	**38.82**	**▼14.08**
Green	David William Morgan	1,176	28.92	▲12.77
Liberal Democrats	Rebecca Tania Turner	975	23.97	▲3.40
Conservative	Stuart Wood	155	3.81	▼0.33
Liberal	David Seth Harrap	115	2.83	▼1.25
Independent	Adam Giles Heatherington	67	1.65	▼0.51
Majority		403	9.91	▼22.42
Turnout		4,067	38.55	▲5.21
Rejected ballots		22	0.54	▼0.09
Total ballots		4,089	38.76	
Registered electors		10,550		
Labour **hold**		Swing	-13.42	

=== Elections of the 2010s ===
Thursday 2 May 2019
Party	Candidate	Votes	%	±%
**Labour**	**Dave Cummings**	**1,841**	**52.90**	**▼9.57**
Liberal Democrats	Graham Hulme	716	20.57	▲1.35
Green	David William Morgan	562	16.15	▲7.23
Conservative	Stuart Wood	144	4.14	▼3.13
Liberal	David Seth Harrap	142	4.08	▲1.96
Democrats and Veterans	Adam Giles Heatherington	75	2.16	N/A
Majority		1,125	32.33	▼9.91
Turnout		3,480	33.34	▲0.90
Rejected ballots		22	0.63	▲0.62
Registered electors		10,439		
Labour **hold**		Swing	-5.46	

Thursday 3 May 2018
Party	Candidate	Votes	%	±%
**Labour**	**Angela Coleman**	**2,122**	**62.47**	**▲0.28**
Liberal Democrats	Graham Hulme	653	19.22	▼3.49
Green	David William Morgan	303	8.92	▲2.54
Conservative	Stuart Wood	247	7.27	▲0.51
Liberal	Jonathan Mason	72	2.12	N/A
Majority		1,469	42.24	▲8.83
Turnout		3,409	32.44	
Rejected ballots		12	0.35%	
Registered electors		10,510		
Labour **hold**		Swing	▲1.88	

Wavertree By-election: Thursday 4 May 2017
Party	Candidate	Votes	%	±%
**Labour**	**Clare McIntyre**	**2,632**	**62.19**	**+8.61**
Liberal Democrats	Joe Harmer	961	22.71	+3.54
Conservative	Stuart Wood	286	6.76	+2.15
Green	Paul Woodruff	270	6.38	−5.15
TUSC	Angela Grant	83	1.96	−1.54
Majority		1,671	34.41	
Turnout		4,259		
Labour **hold**		Swing		

Thursday 5 May 2016
Party	Candidate	Votes	%	±%
**Labour**	**Helen Casstles**	**1,929**	**53.58**	**−6.31**
Liberal Democrats	Donald McFarlane Turner	690	19.17	+8.56
Green	Peter Andrew Cranie	415	11.53	+0.04
Liberal	Pamela Ann Bradley	274	7.61	n/a
Conservative	Diane Isobel Watson	166	4.61	−2.33
TUSC	Angela Grant	126	3.50	+0.97
Majority		1239	34.41	
Turnout		3648	35.53	
Labour **hold**		Swing		

Liverpool City Council Municipal Elections 2015: 7th May 2015
Party	Candidate	Votes	%	±%
Labour	**Dave Cummings**	**4280**	**59.89**	
Green	Julie Birch-Holt	821	11.49	
Liberal Democrats	Leo Evans	758	10.61	
Conservative	Dianne Watcon	496	6.94	
UKIP	Vincent McDermott	484	6.77	
TUSC	Angela Grant	181	2.53	
Independent	Stephen McNally	127	1.78	
Majority				
Turnout				
Labour **hold**		Swing		

Liverpool City Council Municipal Elections 2014: 22nd May 2014
Party	Candidate	Votes	%	±%
Labour	**Rosie Jolly**	**1859**	**53.36**	**+5.07**
UKIP	Neil Lawrence Miney	438	12.57	n/a
Liberal Democrats	Stephen Maddison	435	12.49	+3.27
Green	Elizabeth Susan Pascoe	351	10.07	+3.55
Conservative	Diane Isabel Watson	155	4.45	+1.59
Liberal	James Robert Dykstra	131	3.76	n/a
NHA	Stephen McNally	115	3.30	n/a
Majority		1,421	40.79	
Turnout		3484	34.00	−4.69
Labour **hold**		Swing		

Liverpool City Council Municipal Elections 2012: 3rd May 2012
Party	Candidate	Votes	%	±%
Labour	**Helen Casstles**	**1874**	**48.29**	
Independent	Warren Bradley	1118	28.81	
Liberal Democrats	Kevin White	358	9.22	
Green	Elizabeth Susan Pascoe	253	6.52	
UKIP	Neil Lawrence Miney	122	3.14	
Conservative	Sabrina Bigby	111	2.86	
BNP	Mike Whitby	45	1.16	
Majority		756		
Turnout		3881	38.69	
Labour **hold**		Swing		

Liverpool City Council Municipal Elections 2011: 5th May 2011
Party	Candidate	Votes	%	±%
Labour	**Jake Morrison**	**2337**	**51.27**	**+14.33**
Liberal Democrats	Mike Storey	1444	31.68	−15.26
Green	Elizabeth Susan Pascoe	275	6.03	+0.76
UKIP	Neil Lawrence Miney	184	4.04	n/a
Liberal	Sean Keatley	138	3.03	−2.74
Conservative	Angela Maria Oates	129	2.83	−2.26
Respect	Diana Linda Raby	51	1.12	n/a
Majority		893	19.59	+29.59
Turnout		4558	44.64	−18.92
Labour **gain** from Liberal Democrats		Swing	+21.96	

Liverpool City Council Municipal Elections 2010: Wavertree
Party	Candidate	Votes	%	±%
Liberal Democrats	**Rosie Jolly**	**3118**	**46.94**	−21.57
Labour	Anthony Robert Murphy	2454	36.94	+21.29
Liberal	Mary Jane Canning	383	5.77	+4.35
Green	Elizabeth Susan Pascoe	350	5.27	−3.88
Conservative	Christopher Mark Clinton	338	5.09	−0.18
Majority		664	10.00	
Turnout		6643	63.56	+32.97
Liberal Democrats **hold**		Swing	-21.43	

=== Elections of the 2000s ===
Liverpool City Council Municipal Elections 2008: Wavertree
Party	Candidate	Votes	%	±%
Liberal Democrats	**Warren Bradley**	**2223**	**68.51**	
Labour	Nicholas Richard Wallace	508	15.65	
Green	Julie Elizabeth Birch-Holt	297	9.15	
Conservative	David Grundy	171	5.27	
Liberal	Charles Railton Mayes	46	1.42	
Majority				
Turnout		3245	30.59	
Liberal Democrats **hold**		Swing		

Liverpool City Council Municipal Elections 2007: Wavertree
Party	Candidate	Votes	%	±%
Liberal Democrats	**Mike Storey CBE**	**2350**	**70.04**	
Labour	Timothy Beaumont	559	16.66	
Green	Julie Elizabeth Birch-Holt	219	6.53	
Conservative	David Grundy	137	4.08	
Liberal	Charles Railton Mayes	90	2.68	
Majority				
Turnout		3355	32.10	
Liberal Democrats **hold**		Swing		

Liverpool City Council Municipal Elections 2006: Wavertree
Party	Candidate	Votes	%	±%
Liberal Democrats	**Steve Hurst**	**1928**	**64.48**	
Labour	Claire Wilner	553	18.49	
Green	Julie Elizabeth Birch-Holt	260	8.70	
Conservative	David Grundy	142	4.75	
Liberal	Susan O'Brien	107	3.58	
Majority				
Turnout		2990	27.73	
Liberal Democrats **hold**		Swing		

After the boundary change of 2004 the whole of Liverpool City Council faced election. Three Councillors were returned.

Liverpool City Council Municipal Elections 2004: Wavertree
Party	Candidate	Votes	%	±%
Liberal Democrats	**Warren Bradley**	**2918**		
Liberal Democrats	**Michael Storey**	**2836**		
Liberal Democrats	**Stephen Hurst**	**2652**		
Labour	Matthew Dunne	550		
Labour	Ebenezer Quartey	498		
Labour	Barrie Grunewald	491		
Majority				
Turnout		3975	36.22	
Liberal Democrats **hold**		Swing	n/a	

== See also ==
- Liverpool City Council
- Liverpool City Council elections 1880–present
- Liverpool Town Council elections 1835 - 1879
