= Warren Bradley (politician) =

Former British politician

Leader of Liverpool City Council
- In office 5 December 2005 – 6 May 2010
- Preceded by: Mike Storey
- Succeeded by: Joe Anderson

Personal details
- Party: Liberal Democrats (until 2011)
- Occupation: Firefighter, former politician

Warren Bradley is a former firefighter and Liberal Democrat politician. He was an Independent councillor for the Wavertree ward, as well as the former Leader of Liverpool City Council.

He was suspended from the Liberal Democrats in 2011, and subsequently expelled, in connection with allegations of an electoral offence. He later pleaded guilty to perjury.

== Early career ==
Bradley became a councillor in Liverpool in May 2000. Whilst a councillor, he continued to work as a firefighter. In 2001, he was the only member of the Merseyside Police Authority to vote against a pay rise for the Authority's members; when the rise was passed, he donated the extra money he received as a result to the Mersey Regional Kidney Patient Support Group.

== Council leadership ==
Bradley was elected as leader of Liverpool City Council on 5 December 2005. He took over from Mike Storey, who resigned after an investigation from the Standards Board for England found he had broken the councillors' code of conduct. Bradley maintained his job as a firefighter whilst working as council leader.

Following the 2010 local elections, he was replaced as council leader by Joe Anderson, after the Liberal Democrats were defeated by Labour in the election. Two city councillors called for his resignation as leader of the Liverpool Liberal Democrats, claiming he had "worked hard" but not "hard enough". A leadership challenge was mounted; however, Bradley won, and retained his position.

Later in 2010, Warren criticised Nick Clegg, the former Deputy Prime Minister and leader of the Liberal Democrats, for failing to oppose the cancellation of the Building Schools for the Future programme.

== Resignation and perjury ==
Bradley resigned as leader of the Liverpool Liberal Democrats, and was suspended by the party, in 2011 after reports of irregularities when nominating his son as a candidate for election. He initially denied the claims, but later pleaded guilty to a charge of perjury, and was fined £1,000.

Bradley subsequently stood as an independent candidate for Wavertree ward in the 2012 Liverpool City Council election. This decision caused consternation within the Liberal Democrats, and he was subsequently permanently excluded from the party. He earned 28.8% of the vote, putting him in second place, just under 20% behind Helen Casstles, the winning Labour candidate, and just under 20% ahead of the Liberal Democrat candidate, Kevin White.

He was replaced as leader of the Liverpool Liberal Democrats by Paula Keaveney.

Political offices
| Preceded by Mike Storey | Leader of Liverpool City Council; 2005–2010 | Succeeded by Joe Anderson |
Party political offices
| Preceded by Mike Storey | Leader of Liverpool City Council Liberal Democrat Group; 2005–2011 | Succeeded by Paula Keaveney |
