= Warbreck (ward) =

Former metropolitan borough council ward in Liverpool, England

Coordinates: 53.4568°N 2.9639°W

- Warbreck ward (2004) within Liverpool
- Area: 3.008 km^{2} (1.161 sq mi)
- Population: 15,398 (2021 census)
  - Density: 5,119/km^{2} (13,260/sq mi)
- Registered Electors: 11,345 (2021 election)
- Metropolitan borough: City of Liverpool
- Metropolitan county: Merseyside
- Region: North West
- Country: England
- Sovereign state: United Kingdom
- UK Parliament: Liverpool Walton

Warbreck ward was an electoral division of Liverpool City Council containing parts of the Walton and Orrell Park areas of Liverpool.

== Background ==
The ward was first established in 1953, its boundaries were changed in 1973, 1980 and 2004 before being dissolved in 2023.

=== Etymology ===
Warbreck means "look-out hill", from Old Norse varŏi "look-out" and brekka "hill (in the sense 'cairn')". The etymology is the same as that of Warbreck (Lancashire). The place-name was recorded as Varebrikke in 1035.

=== 1980 boundaries ===
1980 Warbreck ward

The ward boundary was changed for the 1980 elections. A report of the Local Government Boundary Commission for England published in November 1978 set out proposals for changes to the wards of Liverpool City Council, maintaining the number of councillors at 99 representing 33 wards. Warbreck ward was represented by three councillors.

The report describes the boundaries of Warbreck ward as "Commencing at a point where Breeze Hill meets the northwestern boundary of the City, thence generally northeastwards along said boundary to Roosevelt Drive, thence southeastwards along said drive to Helling Road, thence southwestwards along said road to the road known as Warbreck Moor, thence southwards along said road to Albany Road, thence eastwards along said road to Goodacre Road, thence southeastwards along said road to Longmoor Lane, thence southwestwards along said lane to Long Lane, thence southeastwards along said lane to Stopgate Lane, thence southeastwards along said lane to Charnock Road, thence southwestwards along said road to its end being the northeastern boundary of the Factory, thence northwestwards along said boundary and southwestwards along the northwestern boundary of said factory and in prolongation thereof to the northern boundary of Walton Hall Park, thence westwards and southwestwards along said northern boundary to a point due north of the northernmost corner of Hetherlow Towers, thence due south to said corner, thence generally southwestwards along the northern, and western boundaries of Hetherlow Towers, the northwestern boundary of the Corporation Yard and the northwestern boundary of the Builder's Yard to Moor Lane, thence southwestwards along said lane to the road known as Queens Drive Walton, thence westwards along said road, North Breeze Hill and Breeze Hill to the point of commencement".

=== 2004 boundaries ===
A review by the Boundary Committee for England recommended that the council was formed of a reduced number of 90 members elected from 30 wards. The ward was retained as a smaller ward, gaining a small part of the former Pirrie ward and losing small areas to the new County and Fazakerley wards. The ward was part of the Liverpool Walton Parliamentary constituency.

The ward boundaries followed the boundary of the city with Sefton, the former Southport and Cheshire Lines Extension Railway, the Liverpool to Manchester Lines#Northern route, Long Lane, Stopgate Lane, the northern property boundary on Pirrie Lane, the western property boundary on Torrisholme Road, Walton Hall Avenue, the northern boundary of Walton Hall Park, Moor Lane, Rice Lane, the southern boundary of Walton Hospital.

The ward contained HM Prison Liverpool, Hartley Village and was close to the Netherton area of Bootle. There is also a "Warbreck" public house within the ward's boundaries situated on Orrell Lane.

The population of the ward taken at the 2011 census was 16,481, and at the 2021 Census was 15,398.

=== 2023 elections ===
Following a 2022 review by the Local Government Boundary Commission for England which decided that the existing 30 wards each represented by three Councillors should be replaced by 64 wards represented by 85 councillors, the ward was split up into the new Orrell Park, and Walton wards

== Councillors ==
Election	Councillor	Councillor	Councillor
2004	Jean Seddon (LD)	Richard Roberts (LD)	Elsie Lang (LD)
2006	Jean Seddon (LD)	Richard Roberts (LD)	Elsie Lang (LD)
2007	Jean Seddon (LD)	Ann O'Byrne (Lab)	Richard McLinden (Lab)
2008	Jean Seddon (LD)	Ann O'Byrne (Lab)	Richard McLinden (Lab)
2010	Maria McEvoy (Lab)	Ann O'Byrne (Lab)	Richard McLinden (Lab)
2011	Maria McEvoy (Lab)	Ann O'Byrne (Lab)	Richard McLinden (Lab)
2012	Maria McEvoy (Lab)	Ann O'Byrne (Lab)	Richard McLinden (Lab)
2014	Cheryl Harrison (Lab)	Ann O'Byrne (Lab)	Richard McLinden (Lab)
2015	Cheryl Harrison (Lab)	Ann O'Byrne (Lab)	Richard McLinden (Lab)
2016	Cheryl Didsbury (Lab)	Ann O'Byrne (Lab)	Richard McLinden (Lab)
2018	Cheryl Didsbury (Lab)	Ann O'Byrne (Lab)	Richard McLinden (Lab)
2019	Cheryl Didsbury (Lab)	Ann O'Byrne (Lab)	Richard McLinden (Lab)
2020	Cheryl Didsbury (Lab)	Ann O'Byrne (Lab)	vacant
2021	Cheryl Didsbury (Lab)	Ann O'Byrne (Lab)	Alan Gibbons (Lab)
2022	Sam East (Lab)	Ann O'Byrne (Lab)	Alan Gibbons (Lab)

indicates seat up for re-election after boundary changes.

indicates seat up for re-election.

indicates change in affiliation.

indicates seat up for re-election after casual vacancy.

- Cllr Elsie Lang (Lib Dem, 2004) died of tubercular meningitis in July 2007.
- Cllr Richard McLinden (Labour, 2016), died of Covid in November 2020. No by-election was held due to restrictions imposed during the pandemic and his seat was held vacant until the 2021 election.
- Cllr Cheryl Didsbury (Labour, 2018) resigned from the council in 2022.

== Election results ==
=== Elections of the 2020s ===
==== 2022 by-election ====
Warbreck By-election, Thursday 7 April 2022
Party	Candidate	Votes	%	±%
**Labour**	**Sam East**	**912**	**48.18**	**▼19.48**
Liberal Democrats	Karen Elisabeth Afford	874	46.17	▲31.40
Green	Rebecca Lawson	61	3.22	▼4.71
Conservative	Mark Butchard	46	2.43	▼4.83
Majority		38	2.01	▼50.88
Turnout		1,893	16.97	▼10.48
Rejected ballots		5	0.26	▼2.37
Registered electors		11,155		
Total ballots		1,898	17.01	
Labour **hold**		Swing	-25.44	

==== 2021 ====
Thursday 6 May 2021
Party	Candidate	Votes	%	±%
**Labour**	**Alan Albert Gibbons**	**2,107**	**67.66**	**▼12.92**
Liberal Democrats	Karen Elisabeth Afford	460	14.77	▲9.16
Green	John Bernard Cowan Coyne	247	7.93	▼0.02
Conservative	Mark Butchard	226	7.26	▲3.48
Liberal	George Blacklock Roberts	74	2.38	▲0.29
Majority		1,647	52.89	▼19.74
Turnout		3,114	27.45	▲1.90
Rejected ballots		84	2.63	▲0.97
Registered electors		11,345		
Total ballots		3,198	28.19	
Labour **hold**		Swing	-11.04	

=== Elections of the 2010s ===
==== 2019 ====
Thursday 2 May 2019
Party	Candidate	Votes	%	±%
**Labour**	**Ann O'Byrne**	**2,240**	**80.58**	**▲0.63**
Green	Noel Jane Little	221	7.95	▲3.61
Liberal Democrats	Gerard George Thompson	156	5.61	▼2.24
Conservative	McLean Campbell Patrick Wickham	105	3.78	▼2.76
Liberal	George Blacklock Roberts	58	2.09	▲0.78
Majority		2,019	72.63	▲0.53
Turnout		2,827	25.55	▼0.67
Registered electors		11,064		
Rejected ballots		47	1.66	▲1.21
Labour **hold**		Swing	-1.49	

==== 2018 ====
Liverpool City Council Municipal Elections: 3rd May 2018
Party	Candidate	Votes	%	±%
**Labour**	**Cheryl Didsbury**	**2,321**	**79.95**	**▲9.63**
Liberal Democrats	Jerry Lonsdale	288	7.85	▼6.27
Conservative	McLean Campbell Patrick Wickham	190	6.54	▲3.91
Green	Jean Hill	126	4.34	▼2.06
Liberal	George Blacklock Roberts	38	1.31	▼1.09
Majority		2,093	72.10	▲15.90
Turnout		2,916	26.22	▼2.13
Registered electors		11,122		
Rejected ballots		13	0.45	-0.55
Labour **hold**		Swing	▲7.95	

==== 2016 ====
Liverpool City Council Municipal Elections: 5th May 2016
Party	Candidate	Votes	%	±%
Labour	**Richard Michael McLinden**	**2,166**	**70.32%**	▼4.78
Liberal Democrats	Richard John Roberts	435	14.12%	▲7.22
Green	Jean Hill	197	6.40%	▲2.07
English Democrat	Steven McEllenborough	127	4.12%	▲3.77
Conservative	David Lowe	81	2.63%	▼0.19
Liberal	George Blacklock Roberts	74	2.40%	▲1.87
Majority		1,731	56.20%	▼10.15
Turnout		3,111	28.35%	▼35.72
Registered electors		10,975		
Rejected ballots		31	1.00%	▲0.57
Labour **hold**		Swing	▼6.00	

==== 2015 ====
Liverpool City Council Municipal Elections: 7th May 2015
Party	Candidate	Votes	%	±%
Labour	**Ann O'Byrne**	**5,379**	**75.10%**	▲10.39
UKIP	Joe Gallagher	627	8.75%	▼8.71
Liberal Democrats	Richard John Roberts	494	6.90%	▼1.94
Green	Jean Hill	310	4.33%	▲0.21
Conservative	John Ainsley Watson	202	2.82%	▲0.28
TUSC	India Francesca Taylor	87	1.21	N/A
Liberal	George Blacklock Roberts	38	0.53%	▼0.59
English Democrat	Steven McEllenborough	25	0.35%	▼0.86
Majority		4,752	66.35%	▲19.10
Turnout		7,193	64.07%	▲34.42
Registered electors		11,226		
Rejected ballots		31	0.43%	
Labour **hold**		Swing	▲9.55	

==== 2014 ====
Liverpool City Council Municipal Elections: 22nd May 2014
Party	Candidate	Votes	%	±%
Labour	**Cheryl Harrison**	**2138**	**64.71%**	**−12.58%**
UKIP	Connor Forrest	577	17.46%	n/a
Liberal Democrats	Richard John Roberts	292	8.84%	−0.04%
Green	Ellie Pontin	136	4.12%	+0.76%
Conservative	Jack Stanley	84	2.54%	+0.63%
English Democrat	Steven McEllenborough	40	1.21%	−4.94%
Liberal	George Blacklock Roberts	37	1.12%	−1.02%
Majority		1,561	47.25%	−21.43%
Turnout		3304	29.65%	−1.55%
Labour **hold**		Swing	-15.02%	

==== 2012 ====
Liverpool City Council Municipal Elections 2012: 3rd May 2012
Party	Candidate	Votes	%	±%
Labour	**Richard McLinden**	**2724**	**77.56%**	**−3.90%**
Liberal Democrats	Richard Roberts	312	8.88%	+0.27%
English Democrat	Steven McEllenborough	216	6.15%	+4.75%
Green	Eleanor Edith Pontin	118	3.36%	+2.49%
Liberal	George Blacklock Roberts	75	2.14%	+0.45%
Conservative	Ken Watkin	67	1.91%	−0.9%
Majority		2,412	68.68%	−4.17%
Turnout		3512	31.20%	−3.71%
Labour **hold**		Swing	-4.17%	

==== 2011 ====
Liverpool City Council Municipal Elections 2011: 5th May 2011
Party	Candidate	Votes	%	±%
Labour	**Ann O'Byrne**	**3190**	**81.46%**	**+22.77%**
Liberal Democrats	Richard John Roberts	337	8.61%	−26.32%
UKIP	Enid Lindsay	124	3.17%	n/a
Conservative	Arron Poole	110	2.81%	−1.06%
Liberal	George Blacklock Roberts	66	1.69%	n/a
English Democrat	Lee Alan Walton	55	1.40%	n/a
Green	Ellie Pontin	34	0.87%	−1.64%
Majority		2853	81.46%	+57.69%
Turnout		3916	34.91%	−21.91
Labour **hold**		Swing	+35.93%	

==== 2010 ====
Liverpool City Council Municipal Elections 2010: Warbreck
Party	Candidate	Votes	%	±%
Labour	**Maria McEvoy**	**3761**	**58.69%**	**+0.32%**
Liberal Democrats	Richard John Roberts	2238	34.93%	+12.11%
Conservative	David Jeffery	248	3.87%	−0.98%
Green	Eleanor Edith Pontin	161	2.51%	−0.61%
Majority		1523	23.77%	
Turnout		6408	56.82%	+28.51%
Labour **gain** from Liberal Democrats		Swing	-6.22%	

=== Elections of the 2000s ===
==== 2008 ====
Liverpool City Council Municipal Elections 2008: Warbreck
Party	Candidate	Votes	%	±%
Labour	**Richard Michael McLinden**	**1852**	**58.37%**	
Liberal Democrats	Richard John Roberts	724	22.82%	
BNP	Carol Kilkenny	198	4.85%	
Conservative	Mark Rea	154	4.85%	
Liberal	George Blacklock Roberts	146	4.60%	
Green	Raphael Levy	99	3.12%	
Majority				
Turnout		3173	28.31%	
Labour **hold**		Swing		

==== 2007 by-election ====
Warbreck By-Election 13 September 2007
Party	Candidate	Votes	%	±%
Labour	**Richard McLinden**	**1,796**	**55.16%**	**+10.9%**
Liberal Democrats	Richard John Roberts	1,024	31.45%	−13.8%
BNP	Peter Stafford	136	4.18%	
Independent	Michael Langen	131	4.02%	
UKIP	Joseph Moran	52	1.60%	
Green	Kim Graham	45	1.38%	
Conservative	Mark Rea	40	1.23%	−3.2%
Liverpool Labour Community Party	Alfie Hincks	32	0.98%	
Majority		772	23.8%	
Turnout		3,256	29.41%	
Labour **gain** from Liberal Democrats		Swing		

==== 2007 ====
Liverpool City Council Municipal Elections 2007: Warbreck
Party	Candidate	Votes	%	±%
Labour	**Ann O'Byrne**	**1837**	**48.68%**	
Liberal Democrats	Richard John Roberts	1643	43.53%	
BNP	Carol Kilkelly	178	4.72%	
Conservative	Paul Martyn Barber	66	1.75%	
Green	Don Ross	50	1.32%	
Majority				
Turnout		3774	34.09%	
Labour **gain** from Liberal Democrats		Swing		

==== 2006 ====
Liverpool City Council Municipal Elections 2006: Warbreck
Party	Candidate	Votes	%	±%
Liberal Democrats	**Jean Seddon**	**1380**	**45.20%**	
Labour	Ann O'Byrne	1353	44.32%	
Liberal	Linda Marion Roberts	185	6.06%	
Conservative	Paul Martyn Barber	135	4.42%	
Majority				
Turnout		3053	27.26%	
Liberal Democrats **hold**		Swing		

==== 2004 ====
After the boundary change of 2004 the whole of Liverpool City Council faced election. Three Councillors were returned.

Liverpool City Council Municipal Elections 2004: Wavertree
Party	Candidate	Votes	%	±%
Liberal Democrats	**Elsie Lang**	**2643**		
Liberal Democrats	**Richard Roberts**	**2450**		
Liberal Democrats	**Jean Seddon**	**2309**		
Labour	James Gabriel	1217		
Labour	Robert Carney	970		
Labour	Christine Norris	952		
Liberal	Richard Wright	127		
Majority				
Turnout		4102	36.90%	
Liberal Democrats **hold**		Swing	n/a	

• italics - Denotes the sitting Councillor.
• bold - Denotes the winning candidate.

== See also ==
- Liverpool City Council
- Liverpool City Council elections 1880–present
- Liverpool Town Council elections 1835 - 1879
