= 2012 Liverpool City Council election =

2012 UK local government election

- 3 May 2012

30 of 90 seats (One Third to Liverpool City Council 46 seats needed for a majority
- Turnout: 31% (▼48%)
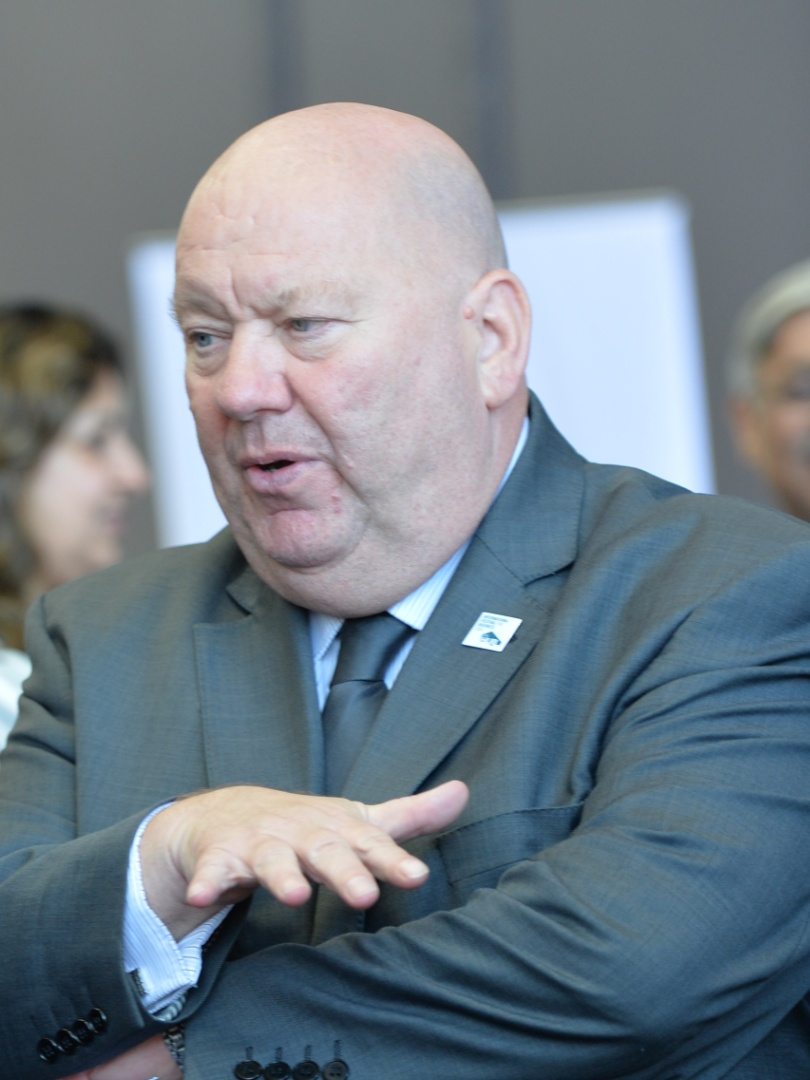

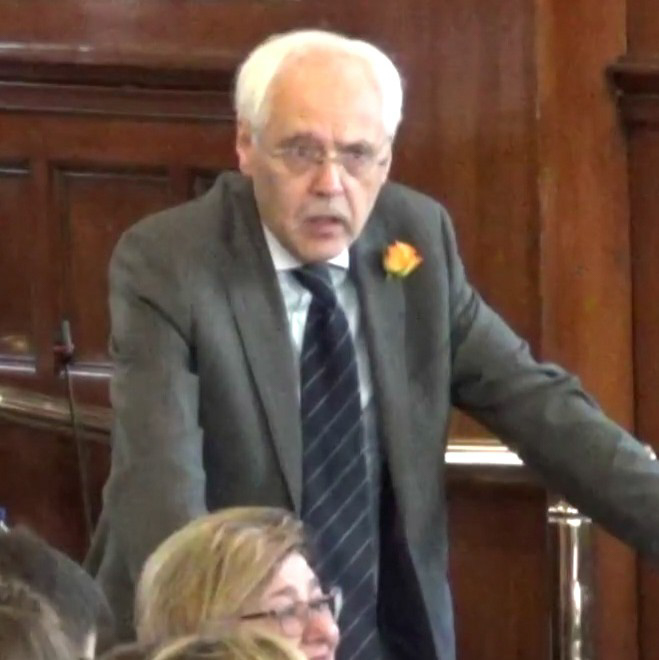

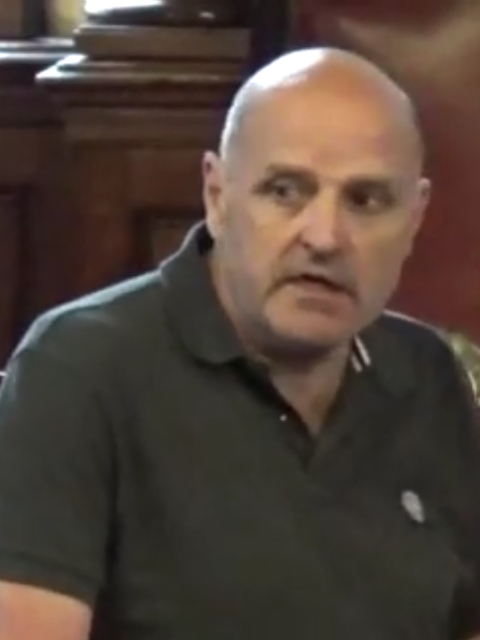
	First party	Second party	Third party
Leader	Joe Anderson	Richard Kemp	John Coyne
Party	Labour	Liberal Democrats	Green
Leader's seat	N/A, Mayor	Church	St Michael's
Last election	62 seats, 63%	1 seat, 16.7%	1 seat, 9.7%
Seats before	63	11	2
Seats won	27	1	2
Seats after	73	10	4
Seat change	▲10	▼9	▲2
Popular vote	65,510	13,354	10,581
Percentage	65%	13.15%	10.7%
Swing	▲1.6%	▼5.00%	▲3.4%
	Fourth party
Leader	Steve Radford
Party	Liberal
Leader's seat	Tuebrook and Stoneycroft
Last election	0 seats, 3.1%
Seats before	3
Seats won	1
Seats after	3
Seat change	Steady
Popular vote	4,450
Percentage	4.5%
Swing	▼0.5%
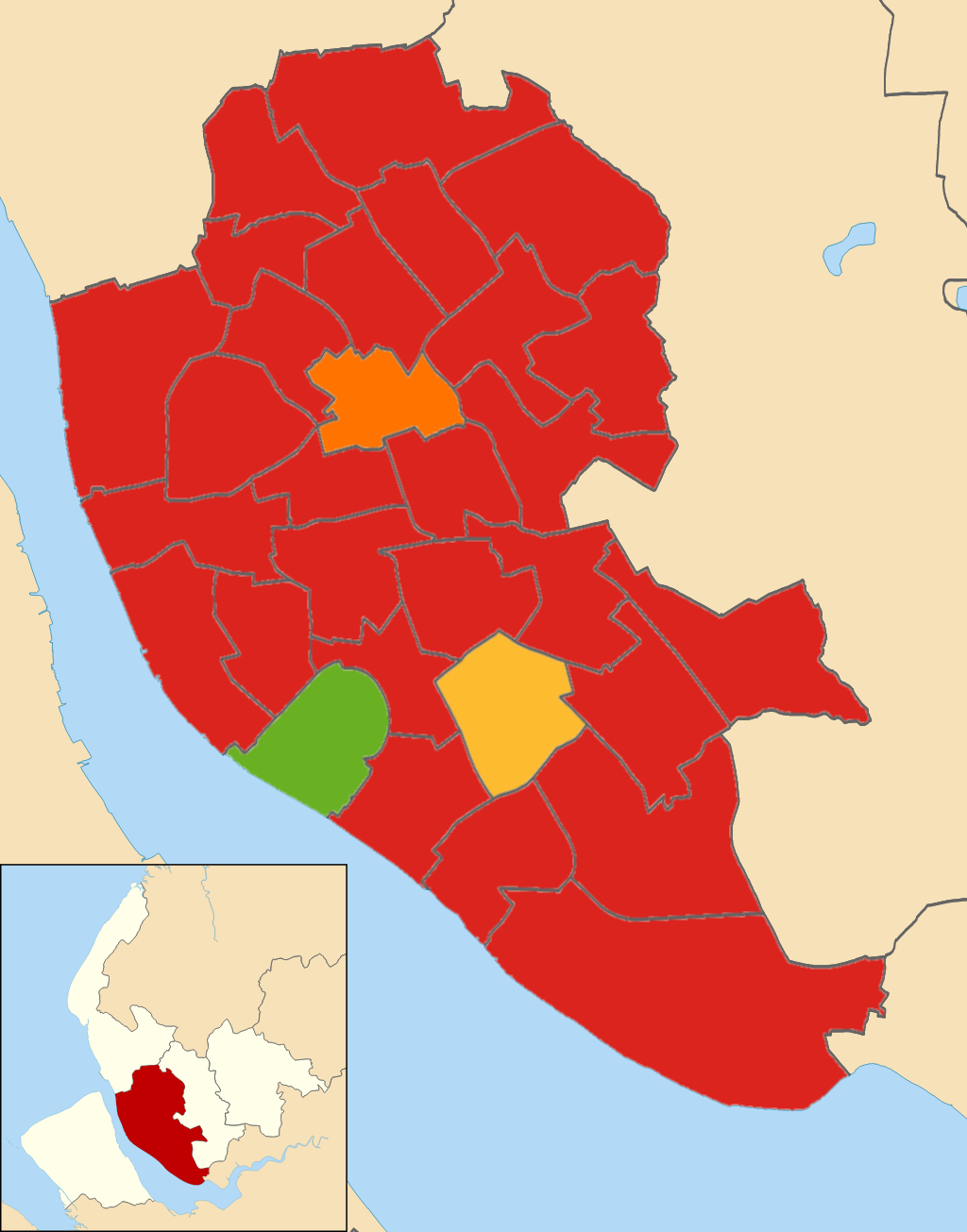
- Map of results of 2012 election
Control of Council before election
Joe Anderson
Labour
Control of Council after Election
Joe Anderson
Labour

Elections to Liverpool City Council were held on 3 May 2012, on the same day as other 2012 United Kingdom local elections, in addition to electing a mayor for the region.

Councillors who were elected in the 2008 Liverpool Council election defended their seats in 2012 and the vote share comparisons have been worked out on this basis.

== Election result ==
Liverpool local election result 2012
Party	Seats	Gains	Losses	Net gain/loss	Seats %	Votes %	Votes	+/−
Labour	27	10	0	+10	90.00	64.50	65,502	+1.38
Liberal Democrats	1	0	9	-9	3.33	13.15	13,354	-5.00
Green	1	0	0	0	2.22	7.26	7,376	+1.31
Liberal	1	0	0	0	3.33	5.39	5,471	+1.26
Conservative	0	0	0	0	0.00	4.57	4,640	-1.44
UKIP	0	0	0	0	0.00	1.49	1,515	+0.31
Independent	0	0	1	-1	0.00	1.18	1,194	
TUSC	0	0	0	0	0.00	1.16	1,175	
English Democrat	0	0	0	0	0.00	<1	516	
Socialist Labour	0	0	0	0	0.00	<1	410	
British Freedom	0	0	0	0	0.00	<1	221	
BNP	0	0	0	0	0.00	<1	179	

== Ward results ==
=== Allerton & Hunt Cross ===
Allerton & Hunts Cross
Party	Candidate	Votes	%	±%
Labour	Dan Hughes	2,465	62%	
Liberal Democrats	Philip Wren	711	18%	
Conservative	Lewis Wooding-Smith	379	9%	
Green	Maggi Williams	237	6%	
Liberal	Chris Hulme	201	5%	
Majority		1,754		
Registered electors		11,035		
Turnout		3,993	36%	
Rejected ballots		26		
Labour gain from Liberal Democrats		Swing		

=== Anfield ===
Anfield
Party	Candidate	Votes	%	±%
Labour	Brian Dowling	2,312	82%	
Liberal Democrats	Michelle Keeley	193	7%	
Green	Jean Hill	116	4%	
Liberal	James Richardson	95	3%	
Conservative	Vicky McDonald	88	3%	
Majority		2,119		
Registered electors		9,340		
Turnout		2,804	30%	
Rejected ballots		31		
Labour hold		Swing		

=== Belle Vale ===
Belle Vale
Party	Candidate	Votes	%	±%
Labour	Claire Wilner	2,709	78%	
Liberal	Damien Daly	200	6%	
Conservative	Jade Adamowicz	159	5%	
BNP	Chris Beatson	134	4%	
TUSC	Lynne Wild	128	4%	
Green	Julie Birch-Holt	127	4%	
Majority		2,509		
Registered electors		11,010		
Turnout		3,457	31%	
Rejected ballots		28		
Labour hold		Swing		

=== Central ===
Central
Party	Candidate	Votes	%	±%
Labour	Christine Banks	1,164	71.45%	+1.02%
Green	Simeon Daniel Hart	195	11.97%	+2.67%
Conservative	Lee David Berry	145	8.90%	+0.49%
TUSC	Daren Andrew Ireland	80	4.91%	n/a
Liberal	James Robert Dykstra	45	2.76%	n/a
Majority		969	58.87%	−1.26%
Registered electors		13,091		
Turnout		1,646	12.44%	−1.26%
Rejected ballots		17		
Labour hold		Swing	-0.83%	

=== Childwall ===
Childwall
Party	Candidate	Votes	%	±%
Labour	Ruth Hirschfield	2,153	51%	
Liberal Democrats	Edwin Clein *	1,380	33%	
UKIP	Adam Heatherington	262	6%	
Conservative	Arron Poole	188	4%	
Green	Pierre Vandervorst	148	4%	
Liberal	Liam Canning	51	1%	
Majority		773		
Registered electors		11,040		
Turnout		4,182	38%	
Rejected ballots		21		
Labour gain from Liberal Democrats		Swing		

=== Church ===
Church
Party	Candidate	Votes	%	±%
Liberal Democrats	Erica Kemp	2,291	49%	
Labour	Richard Wenstone	1,696	36%	
Green	Eleanor Martin	348	7%	
Conservative	Christopher Hall	205	4%	
UKIP	Tony Hammond	163	3%	
Majority		595		
Registered electors		10,659		
Turnout		4,703	44%	
Rejected ballots		15		
Liberal Democrats hold		Swing	+7%	

=== Clubmoor ===
Clubmoor
Party	Candidate	Votes	%	±%
Labour	James Noakes	2,587	78%	
UKIP	Paul Forrest	215	6%	
Liberal	James Gaskell	124	4%	
Liberal Democrats	Francis Roderick	106	3%	
TUSC	Alison Nelson	97	3%	
Green	William Major	85	3%	
Conservative	George Powell	81	2%	
British Freedom	Andrew Harvey	26	1%	
Majority		2,372		
Registered electors		10,952		
Turnout		3,321	30%	
Rejected ballots		30		
Labour hold		Swing		

=== County ===
County
Party	Candidate	Votes	%	±%
Labour	Eryl Owen	2,360	83%	
UKIP	Tom Bodcock	169	6%	
Liberal Democrats	Michael Sefton	142	5%	
Green	Tony Jones	64	2%	
Liberal	Stephen Houghland	53	2%	
Conservative	John Watson	44	2%	
British Freedom	Peter Stafford	17	1%	
Majority		2,191		
Registered electors		9,538		
Turnout		2,848	30%	
Rejected ballots		21		
Labour hold		Swing		

=== Cressington ===
Cressington
Party	Candidate	Votes	%	±%
Labour	Mary Aspinall	2,295	46%	
Liberal Democrats	Paula Keaveney	2,168	44%	
Green	Mark Bowman	263	5%	
Conservative	David Jeffery	216	4%	
Majority		127		
Registered electors		11,473		
Turnout		4,942	43%	
Rejected ballots		22		
Labour gain from Liberal Democrats		Swing		

=== Croxteth ===
Croxteth
Party	Candidate	Votes	%	±%
Labour	Martin Cummins	1,822	65.59	
Socialist Labour	Kai Andersen	410	14.76	
Liberal Democrats	Mark Anthony Coughlin	283	10.19	
English Democrat	Lee Walton	86	3.10	
Conservative	Brenda Coppell	66	2.37	
Green	Donald Ross	60	2.16	
Liberal	John McBride	51	1.84	
Majority		1,539		
Registered electors		10,403		
Turnout		2,778	27%	
Rejected ballots		26		
Labour hold		Swing		

=== Everton ===
Everton
Party	Candidate	Votes	%	±%
Labour	Francis Prendergast	2,548	87%	
Green	Raphael Levy	182	6%	
Liberal	Linda Roberts	88	3%	
Conservative	Frank Carpenter	67	2%	
British Freedom	Jaqueline Stafford	50	2%	
Majority		2,366		
Registered electors		9,837		
Turnout		2,935	30%	
Rejected ballots		26		
Labour hold		Swing		

=== Fazakerley ===
Fazakerley
Party	Candidate	Votes	%	±%
Labour	Louise Ashton-Armstrong	2,622	79%	
Liberal Democrats	Graham Seddon	280	8%	
UKIP	Enid Lindsay	189	6%	
Conservative	Alma McGing	71	2%	
Green	Violaine See	65	2%	
British Freedom	Peter Stafford	50	2%	
Liberal	Karl Hindley	35	1%	
Majority		2,342		
Registered electors		11,086		
Turnout		3,312	30%	
Rejected ballots		20		
Labour hold		Swing		

=== Greenbank ===
Greenbank
Party	Candidate	Votes	%	±%
Labour	James Roberts	1819	59.89%	+4.01%
Green	Lawrence Brown	581	19.13%	+6.85%
Liberal Democrats	Mirna Juarez	364	11.99%	−10.87%
Conservative	Giselle McDonald	200	6.59%	+0.59%
Liberal	Charles Railton Mayes	73	2.40%	+1.27%
Majority		1,238	40.37%	+7.35%
Registered electors		10,765		
Turnout		3,067	28.21	−8.34%
Rejected ballots		30		
Labour gain from Liberal Democrats		Swing	7.44%	

=== Kensington & Fairfield ===
Kensington & Fairfield
Party	Candidate	Votes	%	±%
Labour	Liam Robinson	2,099	78%	
Liberal Democrats	Rebekah Lindeman	155	6%	
Green	Esther Cosslett	139	5%	
Liberal	Karen Williams	130	5%	
TUSC	Neville Jones	109	4%	
Conservative	Lucy McKinstry	64	2%	
Majority		1,944		
Registered electors		8,878		
Turnout		2,696	30%	
Rejected ballots		20		
Labour hold		Swing		

=== Kirkdale ===
Kirkdale
Party	Candidate	Votes	%	±%
Labour	Joe Hanson	2,771	86.89%	+0.53%
Trade Unionists and Socialists Against Cuts	Roger Bannister	143	4.48%	−0.18
Green	Jonathan Clatworthy	89	2.79%	−0.26%
Conservative	Harry Parshall	59	1.85%	−3.15%
Liberal Democrats	Daniel Waterfield	38	1.19%	n/a
Liberal	Lindsey Janet Mary Wood	13	0.41%	−1.46%
Majority		2,628	81.77%	+0.07%
Registered electors		11,433		
Turnout		3,214	27.89%	−2.95%
Rejected ballots		25		
Labour hold		Swing	+0.35	

=== Knotty Ash ===
Knotty Ash
Party	Candidate	Votes	%	±%
Labour	Nicholas Robert Crofts	2,443	71%	
Liberal Democrats	Norman Mills	448	13%	
Green	Tony Christian	193	6%	
Conservative	Pauline Shuttleworth	145	4%	
Liberal	Marjorie Peel	97	3%	
TUSC	John Marston	96	3%	
Majority		1,995		
Registered electors		9,862		
Turnout		3,442	35%	
Rejected ballots		25		
Labour hold		Swing		

=== Mossley Hill ===
Mossley Hill
Party	Candidate	Votes	%	±%
Labour	Emily Elizabeth Spurrell	2,109	51.97%	+3.38%
Liberal Democrats	Paul Philip Childs	887	21.86%	−9.57%
Green	Francis Adrian Irving	489	12.05%	+3.56%
Conservative	Christopher John Kerr	454	11.19%	+0.46%
Liberal	David Stanley Wood	119	2.93%	+1.70%
Majority		1,222	29.82%	+13.14%
Registered electors		10,367		
Turnout		4,098	39.14%	−3.97%
Rejected ballots		40		
Labour gain from Liberal Democrats		Swing	+4.98%	

=== Norris Green ===
Norris Green
Party	Candidate	Votes	%	±%
Labour	Barry Kushner	2,439	86%	
Liberal	Lisa Gaskell	140	5%	
British Freedom	Peter Squire	78	3%	
Conservative	Gillian Ferringo	62	2%	
Liberal Democrats	Stephen Hilditch	52	2%	
Green	Theresa Larkins	50	2%	
Majority		2,299		
Registered electors		10,212		
Turnout		2,821	28%	
Rejected ballots		33		
Labour hold		Swing		

=== Old Swan ===
Old Swan
Party	Candidate	Votes	%	±%
Labour	Gary Millar	2,577	72%	
Liberal	Mary-Jane Canning	267	7%	
Liberal Democrats	Jackie Wilson	221	6%	
Green	Vikki Gregorich	185	5%	
TUSC	John Ralph	123	3%	
English Democrat	Stephen Greenhalgh	111	3%	
Conservative	Norman Coppell	98	3%	
Majority		2,310		
Registered electors		11,113		
Turnout		2,352	32%	
Rejected ballots		23		
Labour hold		Swing		

=== Picton ===
Picton
Party	Candidate	Votes	%	±%
Labour	Nathalie Nicholas	1,960	75%	
Liberal Democrats	Palbrian Woodruff	197	8%	
Green	Jennifer Geddes	195	7%	
UKIP	Shimrit Manning	115	4%	
Liberal	Michele Harrison	83	3%	
Conservative	Seth Pemberton	74	3%	
Majority		1,763		
Registered electors		10,493		
Turnout		2,624	25%	
Rejected ballots		37		
Labour hold		Swing		

=== Princes Park ===
Princes Park
Party	Candidate	Votes	%	±%
Labour	Tim Moore	1,920	71.19%	−1.02%
Green	Elspeth Ruth Anwar	437	16.20%	+4.87%
Trade Unionists and Socialists Against Cuts	Paul Frederick Humphreys	161	5.97%	+2.65%
Conservative	Lucy Glover	104	3.86%	−0.64%
Liberal	Paula Joan Davidson	75	2.78%	+0.96%
Majority		1,483	54.36%	−9.71%
Registered electors		9,344		
Turnout		2728	28.86%	−4.09%
Rejected ballots		31		
Labour hold		Swing	-2.95%	

=== Riverside ===
Riverside
Party	Candidate	Votes	%	±%
Labour	Steve Munby	2,666	81.43%	+3.52%
Green	Peter Andrew Cranie	191	5.83%	+0.31%
Conservative	Angela Oates	139	4.25%	−1.41%
Trade Unionists and Socialists Against Cuts	Celia Ralph	109	3.33%	+0.85%
English Democrat	Neil Kenny	103	3.15%	n/a%
Liberal	Irene Norah Mayes	66	2.02%	+0.28%
Majority		2,475	74.98%	+0.73%
Registered electors		11,112		
Turnout		3,301	29.46%	−1.84%
Rejected ballots		27		
Labour hold		Swing	+2.47%	

=== St. Michael's ===
St. Michael's
Party	Candidate	Votes	%	±%
Green	Sarah Isabel Jennings	1,828	54.05	+3.57%
Labour	Patricia O'Brien	1,148	33.94%	−0.29%
Liberal Democrats	Anne Clare Martin	166	4.91%	−3.41%
Conservative	David Walter Patmore	165	4.88%	−1.23%
English Democrat	Paul Duane Rimmer	75	2.22%	+1.48%
Majority		680	19.99%	+3.73%
Registered electors		9,764		
Turnout		3,402	34.64%	−5.58%
Rejected ballots		20		
Green hold		Swing	+1.93%	

=== Speke-Garston ===
Speke-Garston
Party	Candidate	Votes	%	±%
Labour	Colin Strickland	2,940	85%	
Green	Helen Randall	233	7%	
Liberal Democrats	Rachel Oelbaum	188	5%	
Conservative	Julian Mann	105	3%	
Majority		2,707		
Registered electors		12,727		
Turnout		3,466	27%	
Rejected ballots		36		
Labour hold		Swing		

=== Tuebrook & Stoneycroft ===
Tuebrook & Stoneycroft
Party	Candidate	Votes	%	±%
Liberal	Stephen Radford	2,721	73%	
Labour	Jacqui Taylor	880	24%	
Green	Natalie Clark	87	2%	
Liberal Democrats	Stephen Maddison	35	1%	
Conservative	Gabby Saul	18		
Majority		1,841		
Registered electors		10,433		
Turnout		3,741	36%	
Rejected ballots		23		
Liberal hold		Swing		

=== Warbreck ===
Warbreck
Party	Candidate	Votes	%	±%
Labour	Richard McLinden	2,724	78%	
Liberal Democrats	Richard Roberts	312	9%	
English Democrat	Steven McEllenborough	216	6%	
Green	Ellie Pontin	118	3%	
Liberal	George Roberts	75	2%	
Conservative	Ken Watkin	67	2%	
Majority		2,412		
Registered electors		11,258		
Turnout		3,512	31%	
Rejected ballots		35		
Labour hold		Swing		

=== Wavertree ===
Wavertree
Party	Candidate	Votes	%	±%
Labour	Helen Casstles	1,874	48%	
Independent	Warren Bradley	1,118	29%	
Liberal Democrats	Kevin White	358	9%	
Green	Elizabeth Pascoe	253	7%	
UKIP	Neil Miney	122	3%	
Conservative	Sabrina Bigby	111	3%	
BNP	Mike Whitby	45	1%	
Majority		756		
Registered electors		10,030		
Turnout		3,881	39%	
Rejected ballots		21		
Labour gain from Liberal Democrats		Swing		

=== West Derby ===
West Derby
Party	Candidate	Votes	%	±%
Labour	Lana Orr	2,378	61%	
Liberal Democrats	Graham Hulme	667	17%	
Liberal	Ann Hines	467	12%	
Conservative	Diane Watson	175	5%	
Green	Martin Randall	174	4%	
Majority		1,701		
Registered electors		10,959		
Turnout		3,871	35%	
Rejected ballots		21		
Labour gain from Liberal Democrats		Swing		

=== Woolton ===
Woolton
Party	Candidate	Votes	%	±%
Labour	Mark Norris	1,541	37%	
Liberal Democrats	Kat Dadswell	1,431	34%	
Conservative	Adam Marsden	732	18%	
UKIP	Joseph Chiffers	205	5%	
Green	Fiona Coyne	147	4%	
Liberal	Maria Langley	107	3%	
Majority		110		
Registered electors		10,395		
Turnout		4.163	40%	
Rejected ballots		39		
Labour gain from Liberal Democrats		Swing		

=== Yew Tree ===
Yew Tree
Party	Candidate	Votes	%	±%
Labour	John Prince	2,489	77%	
Liberal Democrats	Peter Allan	271	8%	
Conservative	Patricia Waddington	159	5%	
TUSC	Charley Cosgrove	129	4%	
Green	William Ward	97	3%	
Liberal	Sam Hawksford	95	3%	
Majority		2,218		
Registered electors		11,149		
Turnout		3,240	29%	
Rejected ballots		48		
Labour hold		Swing		

== By-Elections ==
=== Allerton and Hunts Cross, 5 July 2012 ===
Caused by the death of Councillor Vera Best (Liberal Democrat, elected 6 May 2010)

Allerton & Hunts Cross
Party	Candidate	Votes	%	±%
Labour	Rachael O'Byrne	1,450	57%	
Liberal Democrats	Mirna Lizzett Juarez	564	22%	
Conservative	Christopher Matthew Hall	240	9.5%	
Liberal	Chris Hulme	165	6.5%	
Green	Maggi Williams	77	3%	
TUSC	Lynne Wild	31	1.2%	
Majority				
Registered electors				
Turnout		2,527		
Rejected ballots		9		
Labour gain from Liberal Democrats		Swing		

=== Riverside, 5 July 2012 ===
Caused by the resignation of Joe Anderson on his being elected as Mayor of Liverpool.

Riverside
Party	Candidate	Votes	%	±%
Labour	Hetty Wood	1,424	77%	
Green	Peter Cranie	163	8.8%	
TUSC	Chris McDermott	115	6.2%	
Liberal Democrats	Nicola Jane Beckett	198	5.6	−4.8
Conservative	Alma McGing	81	4.4%	
Majority				
Registered electors				
Turnout		1,853		
Rejected ballots		6		
Labour hold		Swing		

=== Knotty Ash, 15 November 2012 ===
Caused by the resignation of Jacqui Nasuh (Labour, elected 6 May 2010).

Knotty Ash by-election, 15 November 2012
Party	Candidate	Votes	%	±%
Labour	Ged Taylor	1,213	69%	
Liberal Democrats	Stephen Maddison	149	8.4%	
Liberal	Ann Hines	131	7.4%	
UKIP	Adam Heatherington	101	7.4%	
English Democrat	Derek Francis Grue	50	2.8%	
TUSC	Charley Cosgrove	48	2.7%	
Conservative	Jack Stallworthy	40	2.3%	
Green	Jonathan Michael Deamer	36	2%	
Majority			61.26%	
Registered electors				
Turnout		1,768		
Rejected ballots		27		
Labour hold		Swing		

=== Riverside, 5 December 2013 ===
Caused by the resignation of Paul Brant ( Labour, elected 5 May 2011).

Riverside by-election, 5 December 2013
Party	Candidate	Votes	%	±%
Labour	Michelle Corrigan	1,055	71%	
Green	Martin Sydney Dobson	144	9.7%	
UKIP	Adam Heatherington	119	8.0%	
Liberal Democrats	Kevin White	64	4.0%	
TUSC	John Gary Marston	49	3.3%	
Conservative	Christopher Matthew Hall	39	2.62%	
English Democrat	Steven McEllenborough	9	0.60%	
Independent	Peter Anthony Cooney	7	0.47%	
Independent	Alison Louise Nelson	1	0.06%	
Majority		911	61.26%	
Registered electors		12,817		
Turnout		1,487	11.63%	
Rejected ballots		3		
Labour hold		Swing		
