= Fazakerley (ward) =

Former metropolitan borough council ward in Liverpool, England

Coordinates: 53.4661°N 2.9247°W

- Fazakerley ward (2004) within Liverpool
- Area: 5.664 km^{2} (2.187 sq mi)
- Population: 16,374 (2021 census)
  - Density: 2,891/km^{2} (7,490/sq mi)
- Registered Electors: 11,299 (2022 by-election)
- Metropolitan borough: City of Liverpool
- Metropolitan county: Merseyside
- Region: North West
- Country: England
- Sovereign state: United Kingdom
- UK Parliament: Liverpool Walton

Fazakerley ward was an electoral division of Liverpool City Council between 1953 and 2022.

== Background ==
The ward was first formed in 1953, its boundaries were changed in 1973, 1980 and 2004 before being split up for the 2023 elections.

=== 1980 boundaries ===
1980 ward boundaries

A report of the Local Government Boundary Commission for England published in November 1978 set out proposals for changes to the wards of Liverpool City Council, maintaining the number of councillors at 99 representing 33 wards. Croxteth ward was represented by three councillors.

The report describes the boundaries as "Commencing at a point where the eastern boundary of Warbreck Ward meets the northern boundary of the City, thence generally eastwards along said City boundary and southeastwards along the northeastern boundary of the City to Stonebridge Lane, thence southeastwards along said lane to East Lancashire Road, thence southwestwards along said road to the access way between East Lancashire Road and Sparrow Hall Road to the east of No 151 East Lancashire Road, thence northwestwards along said access way to Sparrow Hall Road, thence westwards along said road to Landford Avenue, thence southwestwards along said avenue to Waresley Crescent, thence generally northwestwards along said crescent to Studland Road, thence westwards along said road to Hursley Road, thence northwards along said road to Long Lane, thence southwestwards along said lane to the eastern boundary of Warbreck Ward, thence generally northwestwards along said boundary to the point of commencement".

=== 2004 boundaries ===
A review by the Boundary Committee for England recommended that the council was formed of a reduced number of 90 members elected from 30 wards.

The new ward retained the majority of the former ward, losing a small part to the new Norris Green ward and taking in parts of the former Gillmoss and Warbreck wards. The ward was part of the Liverpool Walton Parliamentary constituency.

The population of the ward at the 2021 Census was 16,374.

The ward was dissolved at the 2023 elections where it was distributed into the new Fazakerley East, Fazakerley North wards, Fazakerley West and a small part of the Walton ward.

== Councillors ==
Election	Councillor	Councillor	Councillor
2004	Dave Hanratty (Lab)	Steve Rotheram (Lab)	Jack Spriggs (Lab)
2006	Dave Hanratty (Lab)	Steve Rotheram (Lab)	Jack Spriggs (Lab)
2007	Dave Hanratty (Lab)	Steve Rotheram (Lab)	Jack Spriggs (Lab)
2008	Dave Hanratty (Lab)	Steve Rotheram (Lab)	Jack Spriggs (Lab)
2010	Dave Hanratty (Lab)	Steve Rotheram (Lab)	Louise Ashton-Armstrong (Lab)
2010	Dave Hanratty (Lab)	Steve Rotheram (Lab)	Louise Ashton-Armstrong (Lab)
2011	Dave Hanratty (Lab)	Peter Clarke (Lab)	Louise Ashton-Armstrong (Lab)
2012	Dave Hanratty (Lab)	Peter Clarke (Lab)	Louise Ashton-Armstrong (Lab)
2014	Dave Hanratty (Lab)	Peter Clarke (Lab)	Louise Ashton-Armstrong (Lab)
2015	Dave Hanratty (Lab)	Peter Clarke (Lab)	Paul Brant (Lab)
2016	Dave Hanratty (Lab)	Peter Clarke (Lab)	Paul Brant (Lab)
2018	Lindsay Melia (Lab)	Peter Clarke (Lab)	Paul Brant (Lab)
2019	Lindsay Melia (Lab)	Frazer Lake (Lab)	Paul Brant (Lab)
2021	Lindsay Melia (Lab)	Frazer Lake (Lab)	Paul Brant (Lab)
2022	Helen Stephens (Lab)	Frazer Lake (Lab)	Paul Brant (Lab)

indicates seat up for re-election after boundary changes.

indicates seat up for re-election.

indicates change in affiliation.

indicates seat up for re-election after casual vacancy.

- Cllr Jack Springs (Labour, 2008) died of pneumonia on 11 December 2009 aged 75.
- Cllr Louise Ashton-Armstrong (Labour, 2012) resigned from the council in 2015.
- Cllr Lindsay Melia (Labour, 2018) resigned from the council in 2022 after breaking the party whip to vote against the budget.

== Election results ==
=== Elections of the 2020s ===
==== 2022 by-election ====
Fazakerley By-election: 30 June 2022
Party	Candidate	Votes	%	±%
**Labour**	**Helen Patricia Stephens**	**1,365**	**57.55**	**▼9.73**
Independent	Laura-Jayne Wharton	638	26.90	N/A
Liberal Democrats	Jack Neville Williams	290	12.23	▲12.11
Green	Paul Joseph Corry	79	3.33	▼5.71
Majority		727	30.65	▼24.80
Turnout		2,372	20.99	▼3.90
Rejected ballots		9	0.38	▼2.22
Total votes		**2,381**	**21.07**	-4.48
Registered electors		11,299		
Labour **hold**		Swing	-18.32	

==== 2021 ====
Liverpool City Council Municipal Elections 2021: 6 May 2021
Party	Candidate	Votes	%	±%
**Labour**	**Paul Brant**	**1,912**	**67.28**	**▼9.83**
Liberal Democrats	Joseph Robert Slupsky	336	11.82%	▲7.15
Green	Ceri Rhys Jones	257	9.04	▲0.58
Conservative	David Niall Gamble	204	7.18	▲0.72
Liberal	Colin Roy Edwards	133	4.68	▲1.39
Majority		1,576	55.45	▼13.21
Turnout		2,842	24.89	▲2.59
Rejected ballots		76	2.60	▲0.92
Total votes		**2,918**	**25.55**	
Registered electors		11,420		
Labour **hold**		Swing	-8.49	

=== Elections of the 2010s ===
==== 2019 ====
Liverpool City Council Municipal Elections 2019: 2nd May 2019
Party	Candidate	Votes	%	±%
**Labour**	**Frazer Lake**	**1,897**	**77.11**	**▼6.06**
Green	Luke Anthony Burke	208	8.46	▲4.12
Conservative	Giselle Henrietta McDonald	159	6.46	▼0.17
Liberal Democrats	Joseph Robert Slupsky	115	4.67	▲0.62
Liberal	Brenda Jean Edwards	81	3.29	▲1.45
Majority		1,689	68.66	▼7.88
Turnout		2,502	22.30	▼1.49
Registered electors		11,221		
Rejected ballots		42	1.68	▲1.34
Labour **hold**		Swing	-5.09%	

==== 2018 ====
Liverpool City Council Municipal Elections 2018: 3rd May 2018
Party	Candidate	Votes	%	±%
**Labour**	**Lindsay Rebecca Melia**	**2,219**	**83.17**	**▲10.46**
Conservative	Giselle Henrietta McDonald	177	6.63	▲3.68
Green	Luke Anthony Burke	115	4.34	▼0.54
Liberal Democrats	Joseph Robert Slupsky	108	4.05	▼6.29
Liberal	Maureen Keyes	49	1.84	N/A
Majority		2,042	76.54	▲14.17
Turnout		2,677	23.79	▼2.67
Registered electors		11,252		
Rejected ballots		9	0.34	
Labour **hold**		Swing	+3.39	

==== 2016 ====
Liverpool City Council Municipal Elections 2016: 5th May 2016
Party	Candidate	Votes	%	±%
**Labour**	**Paul Brant**	**2,068**	**72.71**	**▼5.44**
Liberal Democrats	Graham Charles Seddon	294	10.34	▲7.37
UKIP	Enid Lindsay	260	9.14	▲1.73
Green	Stephen James Lang	138	4.85	▼0.82
Conservative	Christopher Andrew Roland	84	2.95	▼1.82
Majority		1,774	62.37	▼8.37
Registered electors		10,855		
Turnout		2,872	26.46	▼31.83
Labour **hold**		Swing	-6.41	

==== 2015 ====
Liverpool City Council Municipal Elections 2015: 7th May 2015
Party	Candidate	Votes	%	±%
**Labour**	**Peter Clarke**	**5,211**	**78.15**	**▲8.35**
**Labour**	**Paul Brant**	**4,930**		
UKIP	Enid Lindsay	961	7.41	▼9.98
Liberal Democrats	Graham Charles Seddon	385	2.97	▼2.06
Conservative	Aaron Hugh Ellis	369	4.77	▲2.03
Green	Jennifer Mary Brown	367	5.67	▲1.38
Green	Stephen James Lang	365		
Conservative	Glyn Derek Nuttall	251		
Liberal	Irene Mayes	138	1.06	▲0.32
Majority		4,250	70.74	▲18.33
Registered electors		11,154		
Turnout		6,501	58.29	▲30.25
Labour **hold**		Swing	+9.17	

==== 2014 ====
Liverpool City Council Municipal Elections 2014: 22nd May 2014
Party	Candidate	Votes	%	±%
Labour	**Dave Hanratty**	2,163	69.80%	−9.37%
UKIP	Enid Lindsay	539	17.39%	+11.68%
Liberal Democrats	Graham Charles Seddon	156	5.03%	−3.42%
Green	Jennifer Mary Brown	133	4.29%	+2.33%
Conservative	Lucy Glover	85	2.74%	+0.60%
Liberal	Charles Railton Mayes	23	0.74%	−0.32%
Majority		1,624	52.41%	−18.31%
Turnout		3,099	28.04%	−2.02%
Labour **hold**		Swing	-10.53%	

==== 2012 ====
Liverpool City Council Municipal Elections 2012: 3rd May 2012
Party	Candidate	Votes	%	±%
Labour	**Louise Ashton-Armstrong**	2,622	79.17%	+0.60%
Liberal Democrats	Graham Charles Seddon	280	8.45%	−2.98%
UKIP	Enid Lindsay	189	5.71%	n/a
Conservative	Alma Gavine McGing	71	2.14%	−2.41%
Green	Violaine See	65	1.96%	−1.45%
British Freedom	Peter Stafford	50	1.51%	n/a
Liberal	Karl Jordon Hindley	35	1.06%	−0.97%
Majority		2,342	70.72%	+3.58%
Turnout		3,099	30.06%	−2.36%
Labour **hold**		Swing	+1.79%	

==== 2011 ====
Liverpool City Council Municipal Elections 2011: 5th May 2011
Party	Candidate	Votes	%	±%
Labour	**Peter Clarke**	**2831**	**78.57%**	+13.62%
Liberal Democrats	Graham Charles Seddon	412	11.43%	−10.20%
Conservative	Stephen Fitzsimmons	164	4.55%	−0.40%
Green	Violaine See	123	3.41%	+2.26%
Liberal	Charles Railton Mayes	73	2.03%	−0.83%
Majority		2419	67.14%	+23.81%
Turnout		3603	32.42	−25.16%
Labour **hold**		Swing	+11.91%	

==== 2010 ====
Liverpool City Council Municipal Elections 2010: Fazakerley
Party	Candidate	Votes	%	±%
Labour	**Dave Hanratty**	**4250**	**64.95%**	
Liberal Democrats	Graham Charles Seddon	1415	21.63%	
Conservative	Paul Martyn Barber	324	4.95%	
BNP	Peter Stafford	292	4.46%	
Liberal	Irene Norah Mayes	187	2.86%	
Green	Edward Gommon	75	1.15%	
Majority		2835	43.33%	
Turnout		6543	57.58%	
Labour **hold**		Swing		

==== 2010 by-election ====
Following the death of Councillor Jack Spriggs on 11 December 2009 a by election was held on 18 February 2010.

Fazakerley By-election 18th February 2010
Party	Candidate	Votes	%	±%
Labour	**Louise Ashton Armstrong**	**1525**	**57.55%**	
Liberal Democrats	Graham Charles Seddon	807	30.45%	
BNP	Peter James Stafford	234	8.83%	
Green	Alexander Rudkin	84	3.17%	
Majority		718	27.09%	
Turnout		2650	50.82%	
Labour **hold**		Swing		

=== Elections of the 2000s ===
Liverpool City Council Municipal Elections 2008: Fazakerley
Party	Candidate	Votes	%	±%
Labour	**Jack Spriggs**	**1811**	**57.58%**	
Liberal Democrats	Graham Charles Seddon	608	19.33%	
BNP	Peter Stafford	440	13.99%	
Conservative	Denise Mary Nuttall	154	4.90%	
Liberal	Jane Canning	68	2.16%	
Green	Ralf Ganza	64	2.03%	
Majority				
Turnout		3145	27.64%	
Labour **hold**		Swing		

Liverpool City Council Municipal Elections 2007: Fazakerley
Party	Candidate	Votes	%	±%
Labour	**Steve Rotheram**	**1814**	**51.89%**	
Liberal Democrats	Graham Charles Seddon	1159	33.15%	
BNP	Peter Stafford	324	9.27%	
Conservative	Nigel Barber	77	2.20%	
Green	Kim Graham	65	1.86%	
Liberal	Jane Canning	57	1.63%	
Majority				
Turnout		3496	30.66	
Labour **hold**		Swing		

Liverpool City Council Municipal Elections 2006: Fazakerley
Party	Candidate	Votes	%	±%
Labour	**Dave Hanratty**	**1450**	**48.06%**	
Liberal Democrats	Graham Charles Seddon	1333	44.18%	
Liberal	Charles Railton Mayes	121	4.01%	
Conservative	Myra Fitzsimmons	113	3.75%	
Majority				
Turnout		3017	25.52%	
Labour **hold**		Swing		

After the boundary change of 2004 the whole of Liverpool City Council faced election. Three Councillors were returned.

Liverpool City Council Municipal Elections 2004: Fazakerley
Party	Candidate	Votes	%	±%
Labour	**Jack Spriggs**	**1872**		
Labour	**Steven Rotheram**	**1796**		
Labour	**David Hanratty**	**1765**		
Liberal Democrats	Graham Seddon	1320		
Liberal Democrats	Ann Scott	1131		
Liberal Democrats	Gerard Scott	1091		
Conservative	Donna Lockley	321		
Liberal	Alan Bilby	173		
Liberal	Thomas McDonald	164		
Liberal	Terence Formby	146		
Independent	Sean Doherty	116		
Majority				
Turnout		3716	31.36%	
Labour **hold**		Swing	n/a	

• italics - Denotes the sitting Councillor.
• bold - Denotes the winning candidate.
