= Stoneycroft (Liverpool ward) =

Metropolitan borough council ward in Liverpool, England

- Stoneycroft ward within Liverpool
- Population: 4,212 (2023 electorate)
- Metropolitan borough: City of Liverpool
- Metropolitan county: Merseyside
- Region: North West
- Country: England
- Sovereign state: United Kingdom
- UK Parliament: Liverpool West Derby
- Councillors: Steve Radford (Liberal)

Stoneycroft ward is an electoral district of Liverpool City Council within the Liverpool West Derby Parliamentary constituency.

== Background ==
=== 2023 ward ===
The ward was created for the elections held on 4 May 2023 following a 2022 review by the Local Government Boundary Commission for England, which decided that the previous 30 wards each represented by three Councillors should be replaced by 64 wards represented by 85 councillors with varying representation by one, two or three councillors per ward. The Stoneycroft ward was created as a single-member ward from the south-eastern portion of the former Tuebrook and Stoneycroft ward and a small portion of the former Old Swan ward. The ward boundaries follow West Derby Road, Mill Lane, Queens Drive, Derby Lane, behind Stoneville Road, Portlet Road, Mentstone Road and Brelade Road, and the Canada Dock Branch line.

== Councillors ==
Election	Councillor
2023	Steve Radford (Lib)

indicates seat up for re-election after boundary changes.

indicates seat up for re-election.

indicates change in affiliation.

indicates seat up for re-election after casual vacancy.

== Election results ==
=== Elections of the 2020s ===
4 May 2023
Party	Candidate	Votes	%	±%
Liberal	Steve Radford (Note: Steve Radford was a re-standing councillor for the former Tuebrook and Stoneycroft ward.)	892	71.13	
Labour	John Patrick Winder	303	24.16	
Liberal Democrats	Catherine Byrne	46	3.67	
Conservative	Jon James Wilkinson	13	1.04	
Majority		589	46.97	
Turnout		1,254	46.97	
Rejected ballots		5	0.40	
Total ballots		1,259	29.89	
Registered electors		4,212		
Liberal win (new seat)				
