= Anfield (Liverpool ward) =

Metropolitan borough council ward in England

Coordinates: 53.4308°N 2.9607°W

- Anfield ward within Liverpool
- Population: 12,951 (2021 census)
- Registered Electors: 8,015 (2023 elections)
- Metropolitan borough: City of Liverpool
- Metropolitan county: Merseyside
- Region: North West
- Country: England
- Sovereign state: United Kingdom
- UK Parliament: Liverpool Riverside
- Councillors: Billy Marratt (Labour Party); Lena Simic (Labour Party)

Anfield ward is an electoral district of Liverpool City Council centred on the Anfield district of Liverpool. The ward is within the Liverpool Riverside Parliamentary constituency.

== Background ==
The ward was created in 1900 with a single councillor elected in that year, a second was elected in 1901 and a third in 1902. The boundary of the ward has been altered in 1953, 1973, 1980, 2004, and 2023. From 2023 the ward is represented by two councillors.

=== 1980 boundaries ===
1980 ward boundaries

A report of the Local Government Boundary Commission for England published in November 1978 set out proposals for changes to the wards of Liverpool City Council, maintaining the number of councillors at 99 representing 33 wards. Anfield ward was represented by three councillors.

The report describes the boundaries as "Commencing at a point where Rocky Lane meets Belmont Road, thence northwestwards along said road and the northeastern boundary of Breckfield Ward to the southeastern boundary of Melrose Ward, thence northeastwards along said boundary to the southern boundary of County Ward, thence northeastwards and southeastwards along said boundary and the western boundary of Clubmoor Ward to a point opposite the southeastern boundary of No 78 Vanbrugh fioad, thence southwestwards to and along said boundary, crossing Vanbrugh Road and continuing along Thombury Road to Trouville Road, thence northwestwards along said road to Westcombe Road, thence southwestwards along said road and Manningham Road to Priory Road, thence southeastwards along said road and Lower Breck Road to Rocky Lane, thence southwestwards along said lane to the point of commencement".

=== 2004 boundaries ===
2004 ward boundaries

A review by the Boundary Committee for England recommended that the council was formed of a reduced number of 90 members elected from 30 wards. The Anfield ward was largely unchanged gaining small areas of the former Breckfield and Tuebrook wards, and losing a small area to the new Tuebrook and Stoneycroft ward. The ward boundaries followed the Canada Dock Branch line, Townsend Lane, between Vallance Road and Curate Road, Behind Westcombe Roadand Manningham Road, Priory Road, Lower Breck Road, around the outer boundary of St Margaret's Primary School, between Rockhouse Street and Thurnam Street, Rocky Lane, Belmont Road, Oakfield Road, Walton Breck Road and Walton Lane.

The population of the 2004 ward at the 2021 census was 14,730.

=== 2023 boundaries ===
In 2023 the ward boundaries were changed following a 2022 review by the Local Government Boundary Commission for England, which decided that the previous 30 wards each represented by three Councillors should be replaced by 64 wards represented by 85 councillors with varying representation by one, two or three councillors per ward. The ward was reformed as a two-member ward, retaining the majority of the former Anfield ward, losing the southernmost extent to the new Everton East ward, and gaining a small section of the former Tuebrook and Stoneycroft ward.

The current ward boundaries are Walton Lane to the west; the Canada Dock Branch Line to the north; Townsend Lane and Breck Road to the east; and Walton Breck Road and Oakfield Road to the south. The ward contains Anfield Cemetery, Stanley Park and Anfield Stadium.

== Councillors ==
Election	Councillor	Councillor	Councillor
1980	Catherine Kaufmann (Lib)	Paul Vincent Downes (Lib)	Myra Fitsimmons (Con)
1982	Catherine Kaufmann (Lib)	Paul Vincent Downes (Lib)	Myra Fitsimmons (Con)
1983	Catherine Kaufmann (Lib)	Paul Vincent Downes (Lib)	Myra Fitsimmons (Con)
1984	Catherine Kaufmann (Lib)	Paul Vincent Downes (Lib)	Jacqueline Crowley (Lab)
1986	Vera Best (Alliance)	Paul Vincent Downes (Lib)	Jacqueline Crowley (Lab)
1987	Vera Best (Alliance)	Jacqueline Smith (Lab)	R Jump (Lib)
1988	Vera Best (Alliance)	Jacqueline Smith (Lab)	Judith Nelson (Lab)
1990	S.H. Oldfield (Lab)	Jacqueline Smith (Lab)	Judith Nelson (Lab)
1991	S.H. Oldfield (Lab)	Jacqueline Smith (Anfield Lab)	Judith Nelson (Lab)
1992	S.H. Oldfield (Lab)	Jacqueline Smith (Anfield Lab)	Paul Woodruff (LD)
1994	R. Carrick (Lab)	Jacqueline Smith (Anfield Lab)	Paul Woodruff (LD)
1995	R. Carrick (Lab)	G. Wilson (Lab)	Paul Woodruff (LD)
1996	R. Carrick (Lab)	G. Wilson (Lab)	Alan Walker (Lab)
1998	Kiron Read (LD)	G. Wilson (Lab)	Alan Walker (Lab)
1999	Kiron Read (LD)	Joe Kenny (LD)	Alan Walker (Lab)
2000	Kiron Read (LD)	Joe Kenny (LD)	Jeremy Chowings (LD)
2002	Kiron Read (LD)	Joe Kenny (LD)	Jeremy Chowings (LD)
2003	Kiron Read (LD)	Robert Quinn (LD)	Jeremy Chowings (LD)
WARD REFORMED
2004	Kiron Reid (LD)	Robert Quinn (LD)	Jeremy Chowings (LD)
2006	Kiron Reid (LD)	Robert Quinn (LD)	Andrew Tremarco (LD)
2007	Jimmy Kendrick (LD)	Robert Quinn (LD)	Andrew Tremarco (LD)
2008	Jimmy Kendrick (LD)	Brian Dowling (Lab)	Andrew Tremarco (LD)
2010	Jimmy Kendrick (LD)	Brian Dowling (Lab)	Ian Francis (Lab)
2011	Adele Dowling (Lab)	Brian Dowling (Lab)	Ian Francis (Lab)
2012	Adele Dowling (Lab)	Brian Dowling (Lab)	Ian Francis (Lab)
2014	Adele Dowling (Lab)	Brian Dowling (Lab)	Ian Francis (Lab)
2015	Adele Dowling (Lab)	Brian Dowling (Lab)	Ian Francis (Lab)
2016	Adele Dowling (Lab)	Ros Groves (Lab)	Ian Francis (Lab)
2018	Adele Dowling (Lab)	Ros Groves (Lab)	Billy Marrat (Lab)
2019	Lena Simic (Lab)	Ros Groves (Lab)	Billy Marrat (Lab)
2021	Lena Simic (Lab)	Ros Groves (Lab)	Billy Marrat (Lab)
2021	Lena Simic (Lab)	Tricia O'Brien (Lab)	Billy Marrat (Lab)
WARD REFORMED
2023	Billy Marrat (Lab)	Lena Simic (Lab)	

indicates seat up for re-election after boundary changes.

indicates seat up for re-election.

indicates change in affiliation.

indicates seat up for re-election after casual vacancy.

== Election results ==
=== Elections of the 2020s ===
4 May 2023
Party	Candidate	Votes	%	±%
**Labour**	**Billy Marrat (Note: Billy Marrat was a re-standing councillor for the former Anfield ward.)**	**1,194**	**39.10**	
**Labour**	**Lena Simic (Note: Lena Simic was a re-standing councillor for the former Anfield ward.)**	**868**	**28.42**	
Liberal	Jimmy Richardson	330	10.81	
Liberal	Shelley Williams	251	8.22	
Green	Craig Robert Dobbin	228	7.47	
Liberal Democrats	Wiebke Angela Hidegard Ruterjans	115	3.77	
Conservative	David Michael John Jeffrey	68	2.23	
Majority		864	28.29	
Registered electors		8,015		
Turnout				
Rejected ballots		8		
Total ballots				
Labour **win** (new seat)				
Labour **win** (new seat)				

A by-election was held on 18 November 2021 following the death of Cllr Ros Groves who had successfully defended her seat at the May 2021 elections.

Anfield By-election: 18 November 2021
Party	Candidate	Votes	%	±%
**Labour**	**Tricia O'Brien**	**604**	**55.87**	**▼11.51**
Liberal	James "Jimmy" Richardson	281	25.99	▲15.04
Liberal Democrats	Wiebke Angela Hildegard Ruterjans	73	6.75	▲2.14
Green	Daryl Hodge	72	6.66	▼6.66
Conservative	Alma Gavine McGing	42	3.89	▼1.43
	Adam Heatherington	9	0.83	Steady
Majority		323	29.88	▼26.55
Turnout		1,089	11.96	▼12.87
Registered electors		9,106		
Rejected ballots		8	0.73	▼1.35
Labour **hold**		Swing	-13.28	

Liverpool City Council Municipal Elections 2021: 2 May 2021
Party	Candidate	Votes	%	±%
**Labour**	**Ros Groves**	**1,520**	**67.38**	**▼5.90**
Liberal	James "Jimmy" Richardson	247	10.95	▲3.81
Green	Philip Adam Williamson	171	7.58	▼2.19
Conservative	Muniandy Logasuriyan Subramaniam	120	5.32	▲0.41
Liberal Democrats	Wiebke Angela Hildeguard Ruterjans	104	4.61	▼0.30
Independent	Dylan Thomas Cresswell	94	4.17	N/A
Majority		1,273	56.43	▼7.08
Turnout		2,304	24.74	▲2.93
Registered electors		9,314		
Rejected ballots		48	2.08	▲0.88
Labour **hold**		Swing	-4.86	

=== Elections of the 2010s ===
Liverpool City Council Municipal Elections 2019: 2 May 2019
Party	Candidate	Votes	%	±%
**Labour**	**Lena Simic**	**1,448**	**73.28**	**▼6.73**
Green	Harry Glen Gallimore-King	193	9.77	▲4.64
Liberal	James "Jimmy" Richardson	141	7.14	▲4.62
Liberal Democrats	James Liam Madine	97	4.91	▼1.12
Conservative	Irene Stuart	97	4.91	▼1.39
Majority		1,255	63.51	▼10.20
Turnout		2,000	21.81	▼2.38
Registered electors		9,172		
Rejected ballots		24	1.20	▲0.89
Labour **hold**		Swing	-5.68	

Liverpool City Council Municipal Elections 2018: 3 May 2018
Party	Candidate	Votes	%	±%
**Labour**	**Billy Marrat**	**1,777**	**80.01**	**▲4.74**
Conservative	Christopher Edward Smith	140	6.30	▲2.12
Liberal Democrats	Wiebke Ruterjans	134	6.03	▲0.39
Green	Rachel Burcher	114	5.13	▼0.51
Liberal	James "Jimmy" Richardson	56	2.52	▼3.69
Majority		1,637	73.71	▲4.65
Turnout		2,228	24.19	▲0.32
Registered electors		9,212		
Rejected ballots		7	0.31	
Labour **hold**		Swing	1.31	

Liverpool City Council Municipal Elections 2016: 5 May 2016
Party	Candidate	Votes	%	±%
**Labour**	**Ros Groves**	**1,601**	**75.27**	**▼1.36**
Liberal	James "Jimmy" Richardson	132	6.21	▲1.17
Green	Shaun Ingram	120	5.64	▲0.96
Liberal Democrats	Jeanete Makinson	120	5.64	Steady
Conservative	Thomas Roberts	89	4.18	▲1.92
TUSC	Benjamin Mark Bolton	65	3.06	▲1.84
Majority		1,469	69.06	▼2.62
Turnout		2142	23.87	▼36.97
Labour **hold**		Swing	-1.27	

Liverpool City Council Municipal Elections 2015: 7 May 2015
Party	Candidate	Votes	%	±%
Labour	**Adele Dowling**	**4,276**	**76.63%**	+2.12%
UKIP	Stephen Peter Lee	568	10.18%	n/a
Liberal	James "Jimmy" Richardson	281	5.04%	−0.84%
Green	Shaun Ingram	261	4.68%	−1.16%
Conservative	Thomas Roberts	126	2.26%	1.65%
TUSC	Fred Taylor	68	1.22%	n/a
Majority		3,708	66.45%	+1.81%
Turnout		5,612	60.84%	+33.66%
Labour **hold**		Swing	1.06%	

Liverpool City Council Municipal Elections 2014: 22 May 2014
Party	Candidate	Votes	%	±%
Labour	**Ian Francis**	**1,850**	**74.51%**	−7.94%
NHA	Louise Boothroyd	245	9.87%	n/a
Liberal	James "Jimmy" Richardson	146	5.88%	+2.49%
Green	Jean Hill	145	5.84%	+1.70%
Conservative	Thomas Roberts	97	3.91%	+0.77%
Majority		1,605	64.64%	−10.93%
Turnout		2,483	27.18%	−3.17%
Labour **hold**		Swing	-3.97%	

Liverpool City Council Municipal Elections 2012: 3 May 2012
Party	Candidate	Votes	%	±%
Labour	**Brian Dowling**	**2,312**	**82.45%**	+12.94%
Liberal Democrats	Michelle Keeley	193	6.88%	−13.23%
Green	Jean Hill	116	4.14%	+2.58%
Liberal	James "Jimmy" Richardson	95	3.39%	+0.79%
Conservative	Victoria McDonald	88	3.14%	+0.20%
Majority		2,119	75.57%	+26.16%
Turnout		2,804	30.35%	−3.96%
Labour **hold**		Swing	+13.89%	

Liverpool City Council Municipal Elections 2011: 5 May 2011
Party	Candidate	Votes	%	±%
Labour	**Adele Dowling**	**2223**	**69.51%**	+15.00%
Liberal Democrats	Jimmy Kendrick	643	20.11%	−9.42%
BNP	Karen Gillian Otty	105	3.28%	−2.10%
Conservative	Victoria McDonald	94	2.94%	−0.64%
Liberal	James "Jimmy" Richardson	83	2.60%	−2.70%
Green	Jean Hartrick Hill	50	1.56%	−0.14
Majority		1580	49.41%	+24.43%
Turnout		3198	34.31%	−19.91%
Labour **gain** from Liberal Democrats		Swing	12.21%	

Liverpool City Council Municipal Elections 2010: 6 May 2010
Party	Candidate	Votes	%	±%
Labour	**Ian Francis**	**2817**	**54.51%**	
Liberal Democrats	Ann Kendrick	1526	29.53%	
BNP	Karen Gillian Otty	278	5.38%	
Liberal	Stephen Houghland	274	5.30%	
Conservative	Brenda Coppell	185	3.58%	
Green	Jean Hill	88	1.70%	
Majority		1291	24.98%	
Turnout		5168	54.22%	
Labour **gain** from Liberal Democrats		Swing		

=== Elections of the 2000s ===
Liverpool City Council Municipal Elections 2008: 1 May 2008
Party	Candidate	Votes	%	±%
Labour	**Brian Dowling**	**1521**	**51.54%**	
Liberal Democrats	Robbie Quinn	1077	36.50%	
Liberal	Stephen Houghland	133	4.51%	
Conservative	Francis Victor Stevens	97	3.29%	
Green	Jean Hill	96	3.25%	
Independent	Michael McDonough	27	0.91%	
Majority				
Turnout		2951	29.07%	
Labour **gain** from Liberal Democrats		Swing		

Liverpool City Council Municipal Elections 2007: 3 May 2007
Party	Candidate	Votes	%	±%
Liberal Democrats	**Jimmy Kendrick**	**1324**	**49.63%**	
Labour	Brian Dowling	935	35.04%	
Liberal	Dennis Gaskell	237	8.88%	
Green	Kelly Rice	96	3.60%	
Conservative	Anthony Beilin	76	2.85%	
Majority				
Turnout		2668	25.90%	
Liberal Democrats **hold**		Swing		

Liverpool City Council Municipal Elections 2006: 4 May 2006
Party	Candidate	Votes	%	±%
Liberal Democrats	**Andrew Tremarco**	**1101**	**42.33%**	
Labour	Brian Dowling	824	31.68%	
Liberal	Michael Martin Butler	448	17.22%	
Green	Shane Thomas Paul Delaney	133	5.11%	
Conservative	Allen Ian Epsley	95	3.65%	
Majority				
Turnout		2601	23.29%	
Liberal Democrats **hold**		Swing		

After the boundary change of 2004 the whole of Liverpool City Council faced election. Three Councillors were returned at this election.

Liverpool City Council Municipal Elections 2004: Anfield
Party	Candidate	Votes	%	±%
Liberal Democrats	**Robert Quinn**	**1586**		
Liberal Democrats	**Kiron Reid**	**1500**		
Liberal Democrats	**Jeremy Chowings**	**1328**		
Labour	Thomas Carter	836		
Labour	Brian Dowling	719		
Liberal	Michael Butler	688		
Labour	Janet Kent	680		
Liberal	Linda Roberts	519		
Independent	Joseph Kenny	335		
Socialist Alliance	Lesley Mahmood	108		
Socialist Alliance	Ernest Nattrass	55		
Majority				
Turnout		3357	28.95%	

1 May 2003
Party	Candidate	Votes	%	±%
**Liberal Democrats**	**Robert Quinn**	**1,162**	**47.03**	**▼8.48**
Liberal	Michael Butler	666	26.95	n/a
Labour	Sheila Murphy	416	16.84	▼8.08
BNP	Joseph Owens	150	6.07	n/a
Socialist Alliance	Lesley Mahmood	47	1.90	0.0
Conservative	Alistair Furze	30	1.21	n/a
Majority		496	20.07	▼10.52
Turnout		2,471	24.4	
Liberal Democrats **hold**		Swing	-17.72	

2 May 2002
Party	Candidate	Votes	%	±%
**Liberal Democrats**	**Kiron Reid**	**1,633**	**55.51**	**▲4.76**
Labour	Kevin Doran	733	24.92	▲2.27
Independent	Michael Butler	521	17.71	Steady
Socialist Alliance	Lesley Mahmood	55	1.87	▼0.81
Majority		900	30.59	
Turnout		2,942		
Liberal Democrats **hold**		Swing	1.25	

4 May 2000
Party	Candidate	Votes	%	±%
**Liberal Democrats**	**Jeremy Chowings**	**986**	**50.75**	**▼6.63**
Labour	Ben Williams	440	22.65	▼3.40
Liberal	J. Cumberland	395	20.33	▲13.90
Conservative	M. Cotterell	70	3.60	▲2.09
Socialist Alliance	P. Filby	52	2.68	▲0.52
Majority		546	28.10	
Turnout		1,943		
Liberal Democrats **gain** from Labour		Swing	-1.61	

=== Elections of the 1990s ===
6 May 1999
Party	Candidate	Votes	%	±%
**Liberal Democrats**	**Joe Kenny**	**1,597**	**57.38**	**▼2.71**
Labour	G. Wilson	725	26.05	▲3.42
Liberal	J. Richardson	179	6.43	▼4.11
Conservative	B.A. Nash	42	1.51	▼0.46
Socialist Alliance	P. Filby	60	2.16	Steady
Independent	C. Hulme	180	6.47	Steady
Majority		1,897		
Turnout				
Liberal Democrats **gain** from Labour		Swing		

7 May 1998
Party	Candidate	Votes	%	±%
**Liberal Democrats**	**Kiron Reid**	**1,739**	**60.09**	**▲20.95**
Labour	A. Keenan	655	22.63	▼24.34
Liberal	S. Brooks	305	10.54	▲0.17
Socialist	P. Filby	61	2.11	Steady
Conservative	E.A. Jones	57	1.97	Steady
Official Labour	G. Casey	45	1.55	Steady
Independent	H. Jones	32	1.11	Steady
Majority		1,084	37.46	▲29.63
Turnout		2,894		
Liberal Democrats **gain** from Labour		Swing	22.64	

2 May 1996
Party	Candidate	Votes	%	±%
**Labour**	**Alan Walker**	**1,427**	**46.97**	**▼0.52**
Liberal Democrats	Richard Marbrow	1,189	39.14	▼1.91
Liberal	S. Brooks	315	10.37	▲2.26
Militant Labour	P. Filby	107	3.52	Steady
Majority		238	7.83	▲1.40
Turnout		3,038		
Labour **gain** from Liberal Democrats		Swing	0.70	

4 May 1995
Party	Candidate	Votes	%	±%
**Labour**	**G. Wilson**	**1,558**	**47.49**	**▲3.65**
Liberal Democrats	Peter Allen	1,347	41.05	▼1.64
Liberal	J. Kehoe	266	8.11	▲1.66
Conservative	C. Coffey	110	3.35	▼0.77
Majority		211	6.43	▲5.28
Turnout		3,281		
Labour **hold**		Swing	2.64	

5 May 1994
Party	Candidate	Votes	%	±%
**Labour**	**R. Carrick**	**1,712**	**43.84**	**▲9.68**
Liberal Democrats	R. Cunningham	1,667	42.69	▲3.53
Liberal	J. Kehoe	252	6.45	▲0.39
Conservative	C. Cross	161	4.12	▼6.44
Independent	R. Fallows	113	2.89	Steady
Majority		45	1.15	▼3.61
Turnout		3,905		
Labour **hold**		Swing	2.95	

7 May 1992
Party	Candidate	Votes	%	±%
**Liberal Democrats**	**Paul Woodruff**	**1,513**	**39.16**	**▲13.97**
Labour	J. Rutledge	1,320	34.16	▲11.29
Conservative	Myra Fitzsimmons	408	10.56	▲0.05
Anfield Labour	Judith Nelson	389	10.07	▼20.08
Liberal	T. Newall	234	6.06	▼5.23
Majority		193	4.76	▼0.03
Turnout		3,864		
Liberal Democrats **gain** from Labour		Swing	1.34	

2 May 1991
Party	Candidate	Votes	%	±%
**Anfield Labour**	**J. Smith**	**1,624**	**30.15**	Steady
Liberal Democrats	J. Cunningham	1,357	25.19	▼13.96
Labour	M. Tottey	1,232	22.87	▼33.94
Conservative	Myra Fitzsimmons	566	10.51	▲6.46
Liberal	T. Newall	608	11.29	Steady
Majority		267	4.96	▼12.72
Turnout		5,387		
Anfield Labour **gain** from Labour				

3 May 1990
Party	Candidate	Votes	%	±%
**Labour**	**S. H. Oldfield**	**3,365**	**56.81**	**▲5.75**
Liberal Democrats	Veronica Best	2,319	39.15	▲1.22
Conservative	J. Mass	240	4.05	▼5.10
Majority		1,047	17.68	▲4.53
Turnout		5,923		
Labour **gain** from Liberal Democrats		Swing	2.26	

=== Elections of the 1980s ===
5 May 1988
Party	Candidate	Votes	%	±%
**Labour**	**Judith Nelson**	**2,890**	**51.06**	**▲7.04**
SLD	R. Jump	2,147	37.93	▼5.39
Conservative	Myra Fitzsimmons	518	9.15	▼1.54
SDP	J. Prince	105	2	Steady
Majority		743	13.13	▲12.42
Turnout		5,660		
Labour **gain** from Liberal		Swing		

A by-election was held on 7 May 1987 alongside an ordinary election to fill a vacancy left by Cllr Paul Downes.

7 May 1987 (2 seats)
Party	Candidate	Votes	%	±%
**Labour**	**Jacqueline Smith**	**2,931**	**44.02**	**▲3.80**
**Liberal**	**R. Jump**	**2,884**	**43.32**	**▼7.62**
Liberal	T. S. Newall	2,772	41.63	
Labour	Robert Malcolm Kennedy	2,739	41.14	
Conservative	Myra Fitzsimmons	712	10.69	▲1.84
Conservative	J. H. Brash	557	8.37	
Green	W. Winn	131	1.97	Steady
Majority		47	0.71	▼10.01
Turnout		6,658	54.23	
Registered electors		12,278		
Labour **hold**		Swing	5.71	
Liberal **hold**		Swing		

1 May 1986
Party	Candidate	Votes	%	±%
**Alliance**	**Vera Best**	**3,184**	**50.94**	**▲13.01**
Labour	C. Williams	2,514	40.22	▼2.42
Conservative	J. Brash	553	8.85	▼10.58
Majority		670	10.72	▲6.01
Turnout		6,251		
Registered electors		12,532		
Alliance **hold**		Swing	7.71	

1 May 1984
Party	Candidate	Votes	%	±%
**Labour**	**Jacqueline Crowley**	**2,870**	**42.64**	**▲2.84**
Liberal	R. Johnston	2,553	37.93	▼4.30
Conservative	Myra Fitzsimmons	1,308	19.43	▲1.46
Majority		317	4.71	▲2.27
Turnout		6,731	53.68	▲10.29
Registered electors		12,540		
Labour **gain** from Conservative		Swing	3.57	

5 May 1983
Party	Candidate	Votes	%	±%
**Liberal**	**P. V. Downes**	**2,322**	**42.23**	**▼6.01**
Labour	J. E. Roberts	2,188	39.80	▲11.18
Conservative	A. Nugent	988	17.97	▼5.17
Majority		134	2.44	▼17.18
Turnout		5,498	43.39	▲3.33
Registered electors		12,672		
Liberal **hold**		Swing	-8.59	

6 May 1982
Party	Candidate	Votes	%	±%
**Liberal**	**Catherine Kaufman**	**2,449**	**48.24**	**▲13.84**
Labour	J. Roberts	1,453	28.62	▼1.08
Conservative	T. P. Pink	1,175	23.14	▼12.76
Majority		996	19.62	▲18.12
Registered electors		12,675		
Turnout		5,077	40.06	▲3.96
Liberal **hold**		Swing	7.46	

After the boundary change of 1980 the whole of Liverpool City Council faced election. Three Councillors were returned at this election.

6 May 1980 (3 seats)
Party	Candidate	Votes	%	±%
Conservative	**Myra Fitsimmons**	**1,660**	**35.9**	
Liberal	**Paul Vincent Downes**	**1,587**	**34.4**	
Liberal	**Catherine Kaufmann**	**1,570**		
Liberal	Helen Powell	1,559		
Conservative	Thomas Philip Pink	1,500		
Conservative	James Hugh Brash	1,465		
Labour	David Cowley	1,373	29.7	
Labour	Thomas McManus	1,302		
Labour	Andrew Williams	1,286		
Majority		73	1.5	
Registered electors		12,809		
Turnout			36.1	

• italics denotes the sitting councillor • bold denotes the winning candidate

== See also ==
- Liverpool City Council
- Liverpool City Council elections 1880–present
- Liverpool Town Council elections 1835 - 1879
