= Tuebrook (Liverpool ward) =

Former metropolitan borough council ward in Liverpool, England

Coordinates: 53.425°N 2.928°W

Tuebrook Tuebrook & Stoneycroft (2004-2023)
- Location within Merseyside
- Area: 2.223 km^{2} (0.858 sq mi)
- Population: 15,773 (2021 census)
  - Density: 7,095/km^{2} (18,380/sq mi)
- Registered Electors: 10,414 (2021 election)
- Metropolitan borough: City of Liverpool
- Metropolitan county: Merseyside
- Region: North West
- Country: England
- Sovereign state: United Kingdom
- UK Parliament: Liverpool Walton

Tuebrook ward was an electoral district of Liverpool City Council centred on the Tuebrook district of Liverpool.

== Background ==
The ward was first established in 1953, its boundaries changed in 1973, 1980 and 2004 where it was renamed Tuebrook and Stoneycroft before being split up in 2023.

=== 1980 boundaries ===
1980 Tuebrook ward

The ward boundary was changed for the 1980 elections. A report of the Local Government Boundary Commission for England published in November 1978 set out proposals for changes to the wards of Liverpool City Council, maintaining the number of councillors at 99 representing 33 wards. Tuebrook ward was represented by three councillors.

The report describes the boundaries of Tuebrook ward as "Commencing at a point where Prescot Road meets Balmoral Road, thence northwestwards along Balmoral Road to Whitcroft Road, thence northeastwards along said road to the road known as Elm Vale, thence northwestwards along said road to Carstairs Road, thence southwestwards along said road to Balmoral Road, thence northwestwards along said road to Gardner's Drive, thence westwards along said drive to Sheil Road, thence northwestwards along said road to the southern boundary of Anfield Ward, thence northeastwards along said boundary and northwestwards and northeastwards along the eastern boundary of said ward to the southwestern boundary of Clubmoor Ward, thence southeastwards, northeastwards and southeastwards along said boundary and continuing along Delamain Road to the road known as Mill Bank, thence eastwards along said road to the road known as Queens Drive West Derby, thence southeastwards along said road to Moscow Drive, thence, southwestwards along said drive and Lister Drive to the railway, thence southeastwards along said railway to Prescot Road, thence westwards along said road to the point of commencement".

=== 2004 boundaries ===
Tuebrook & Stoneycroft ward (2004) within Liverpool

A review by the Boundary Committee for England recommended that the council was formed of a reduced number of 90 members elected from 30 wards. The ward was renamed as Tuebrook and Stoneycroft and was formed from the former Tuebrook ward with small parts of the former Anfield, Clubmoor, Croxteth, and Old Swan wards, and losing small areas elsewhere. The ward was part of the Liverpool West Derby Parliamentary constituency.

The ward boundaries followed Manningham Road, the northeastern property boundary of Curate Road and thereafter northeastwards along Townsend Lane, the Canada Dock Branch line, the midpoint of Pennsylvania Road, the southeastern property boundary of Worcester Drive, Maiden Lane, Lisburn Lane, Muirhead Avenue, Queens Drive, Derby Lane, the northern property boundary of Guernsey Road, Green Lane, Lister Drive, Gardiner's Drive, Sheil Road, Rocky Lane, between Rockhouse and Thurnham Streets, around and to include St Margaret's Primary School, Lower Breck Road, and Priory Road.

The population of the ward at the 2011 census was 16,489, and at the 2021 Census was 15,773.

=== 2023 elections ===
Following a 2022 review by the Local Government Boundary Commission for England which decided that the existing 30 wards each represented by three Councillors should be replaced by 64 wards represented by 85 councillors, the ward was split up into the new Kensington & Fairfield, Tuebrook Breckside Park, Tuebrook Larkhill, Stoneycroft wards and a small section in Anfield ward.

== Councillors ==
Election	Councillor	Councillor	Councillor
1998	Hazel Williams (Lib)	K. McCullough (Lib)	Steve Radford (Lib)
1999	Hazel Williams (Lib)	Tom Carter (Lib)	Steve Radford (Lib)
2000	Hazel Williams (Lib)	Tom Carter (Lib)	Steve Radford (Lib)
2002	Hazel Williams (Lib)	Tom Carter (Lib)	Steve Radford (Lib)
2003	Hazel Williams (Lib)	Chris Lenton (Lib)	Steve Radford (Lib)
WARD REFORMED AS TUEBROOK & STONEYCROFT
2004	Chris Lenton (Lib)	Hazel Williams (Lib)	Steve Radford (Lib)
2006	Chris Lenton (Lib)	Hazel Williams (Lib)	Steve Radford (Lib)
2007	Chris Lenton (Lib)	Hazel Williams (Lib)	Steve Radford (Lib)
2008	Chris Lenton (Lib)	Hazel Williams (Lib)	Steve Radford (Lib)
2010	Chris Lenton (Lib)	Hazel Williams (Lib)	Steve Radford (Lib)
2011	Chris Lenton (Lib)	Hazel Williams (Lib)	Steve Radford (Lib)
2012	Chris Lenton (Lib)	Hazel Williams (Lib)	Steve Radford (Lib)
2014	Kevin Morrison (Lib)	Hazel Williams (Lib)	Steve Radford (Lib)
2015	Kevin Morrison (Lib)	Carol Sung (Lab)	Steve Radford (Lib)
2016	Kevin Morrison (Lib)	Carol Sung (Lab)	Steve Radford (Lib)
2018	Billy Lake (Lib)	Carol Sung (Lab)	Steve Radford (Lib)
2019	Billy Lake (Lib)	Joe Dunne (Lib)	Steve Radford (Lib)
2021	Billy Lake (Lib)	Joe Dunne (Lib)	Steve Radford (Lib)

indicates seat up for re-election after boundary changes.

indicates seat up for re-election.

indicates change in affiliation.

indicates seat up for re-election after casual vacancy.

== Election results ==
=== Elections of the 2020s ===
Liverpool City Council elections, 6th May 2021: Tuebrook and Stoneycroft
Party	Candidate	Votes	%	±%
Liberal	Steve Radford	2,364	69.78%	▼8.47
Labour	Dave Barlow	719	21.22%	▲4.76
Green	Natasha Mary Bradley	123	3.63%	▲2.13
Conservative	Giselle McDonald	85	2.51%	▲2.10
TUSC	Kieran McHale	57	1.68%	N/A
Liberal Democrats	Joseph Slupsky	40	1.18%	▼0.29
Majority		1,645		
Turnout		3,388		
Registered electors		10,414		
Rejected ballots		46		
Liberal hold		Swing		

=== Elections of the 2010s ===
Liverpool City Council elections, 2nd May 2019: Tuebrook and Stoneycroft
Party	Candidate	Votes	%	±%
Liberal	Joe Dunne	2,132	67.96	▲3.92
Labour	Rona Ellan Heron	798	25.44	▼7.12
Green	Martin Sydney Dobson	93	2.96	▲1.77
Liberal Democrats	Jenny Goulding	82	2.61	▲1.34
Conservative	Luke Andrew Hingley-Smith	32	1.02	▲0.08
Majority		1,334	42.52	▲11.03
Turnout		3,151	30.73	▼7.27
Registered electors		10,253		
Rejected ballots		14	0.44%	▲0.26
Liberal gain from Labour		Swing	▲5.52	

Liverpool City Council Municipal Elections 2018: Tuebrook and Stoneycroft
Party	Candidate	Votes	%	±%
Liberal	Billy Lake	2,524	64.04	▼14.24
Labour	Don Porter	1,283	32.56	▲16.10
Liberal Democrats	Pat Moloney	50	1.27	▼0.20
Green	Martin Sydney Dobson	47	1.19	▼0.31
Conservative	Elliot Henry Robin Craddock	37	0.94	▲0.53
Majority		1,241	31.49	▼30.30
Turnout		3,948	38.00	▲1.46
Registered electors		10,390		
Rejected ballots		7	0.18%	
Liberal hold		Swing		

Liverpool City Council Municipal Elections 2016: Tuebrook and Stoneycroft
Party	Candidate	Votes	%	±%
Liberal	Steve Radford	2,871	78.25	+43.32
Labour	Don Porter	604	16.46	−36.61
UKIP	Enid Monkcom	70	1.91	−2.92
Green	Martin Dobson	55	1.50	−1.41
Liberal Democrats	Jerry Lonsdale	54	1.47	−0.03
Conservative	Angela Maria Oates	15	0.41	−1.17
Majority		2,267	61.79	N/A
Turnout		3,669	36.54	−27.08
Registered electors		10,042		
Liberal hold		Swing		

Liverpool City Council Municipal Elections 2015: Tuebrook and Stoneycroft
Party	Candidate	Votes	%	±%
Labour	Carol Sung	3,470	53.07	+23.88
Liberal	Berni Turner	2,284	34.93	−25.11
UKIP	Enid Moncom	316	4.83	N/A
Green	Joan Margaret Evans	190	2.91	−2.34
Conservative	Robert Leslie Albert Poynton	103	1.58	−0.76
Liberal Democrats	Jerry Lonsdale	98	1.50	N/A
TUSC	Craig Pearson	77	1.18	−1.99
Majority		1,186	18.14	N/A
Turnout		6,538	63.62	+33.06
Registered electors		10,277		
Labour gain from Liberal		Swing	-25.11	

Liverpool City Council Municipal Elections 2014: Tuebrook and Stoneycroft
Party	Candidate	Votes	%	±%
Liberal	Kevin John Morrison	1,874	60.04	−12.69
Labour	Aver Gbaa	911	29.19	+5.67
Green	Natalie Elizabeth Clarke	164	5.25	+2.92
TUSC	Craig Pearson	99	3.17%	N/A
Conservative	Peter Connick	73	2.34	+1.86
Majority		963	30.85	−18.35
Turnout		3,121	30.56	−5.52
Registered electors		10,264		
Liberal hold		Swing	-9.18	

Liverpool City Council Municipal Elections 2012: Tuebrook and Stoneycroft
Party	Candidate	Votes	%	±%
Liberal	Steve Radford	2,721	72.73	+8.92
Labour	Jacqui Taylor	880	23.52	−5.91
Green	Natalie Elizabeth Clarke	87	2.33	+0.32
Liberal Democrats	Stephen Maddison	35	0.94	−0.86
Conservative	Gabrielle Saul	18	0.48	−0.79
Majority		1,841	49.20	+14.83
Turnout		3,741	36.08	−0.21
Registered electors		10,433		
Liberal hold		Swing	+7.42	

Liverpool City Council Municipal Elections 2011: Tuebrook and Stoneycroft
Party	Candidate	Votes	%	±%
Liberal	Hazel Williams	2,415	63.80	+4.53
Labour	Matthew Shiel	1,114	29.43	−4.91
Green	Natalie Elizabeth Clarke	76	2.01	−1.19
Liberal Democrats	Paula Birkitt	68	1.80	N/A
BNP	Phillip James Mariott	64	1.69	N/A
Conservative	Gabrielle Saul	48	1.27	−1.93
Majority		1,301	34.37	−24.90
Turnout		3,785	36.29	−20.46
Registered electors		10,430		
Liberal hold		Swing	+2.08	

Liverpool City Council Municipal Elections 2010: Tuebrook and Stoneycroft
Party	Candidate	Votes	%	±%
Liberal	Christopher Lenton	3,523	59.27	−13.16
Labour	Daniel Dean Barrington	2,041	34.34	+17.87
Green	Natalie Elizabeth Clark	190	3.20	+0.07
Conservative	Prashant Singh	190	3.20	−0.17
Majority		1,482	59.27	+3.31
Turnout		5,944	56.75	+29.65
Registered electors		10,474		
Liberal hold		Swing	-15.52	

=== Elections of the 2000s ===
Liverpool City Council Municipal Elections 2008: Tuebrook and Stoneycroft
Party	Candidate	Votes	%	±%
Liberal	Steve Radford	2,128	72.43	+8.31
Labour	Robert Millington	484	16.47	−3.57
Liberal Democrats	Kathryn Dadswell	135	4.59	−1.27
Conservative	George Powell	99	3.37	+0.67
Green	Jennifer Mary Brown	92	3.13	−0.28
Majority		1,644	55.96	+11.88
Turnout		2,938	27.10	+1.21
Registered electors		10,843		
Liberal hold		Swing		

Liverpool City Council Municipal Elections 2007: Tuebrook and Stoneycroft
Party	Candidate	Votes	%	±%
Liberal	Hazel Williams	1,805	64.12	+3.52
Labour	Allen Edward Hammond	564	20.04	−3.94
Liberal Democrats	Anton Roscoe Minnion	165	5.86	−5.90
BNP	Sharon Broadfoot	109	3.87	N/A
Green	Jennifer Mary Brown	96	3.41	N/A
Conservative	Lauren Graham	76	2.70	+0.97
Majority		1,241	44.08	+7.46
Turnout		2,815	25.89	+3.59
Registered electors		10,874		
Liberal hold		Swing		

Liverpool City Council Municipal Elections 2006: Tuebrook and Stoneycroft
Party	Candidate	Votes	%	±%
Liberal	Chris Lenton	1,587	60.60	N/A
Labour	Allen Edward John Hammond	628	23.98	N/A
Liberal Democrats	Richard Mark Williams	308	11.76	N/A
Conservative	Damian Fisher	96	3.67	N/A
Majority		959	36.62	N/A
Turnout		2,619	22.30	−4.91
Registered electors		11,742		
Liberal hold		Swing		

After the boundary change of 2004 the whole of Liverpool City Council faced election. Three Councillors were returned at this election.

Liverpool City Council Municipal Elections 2004: Tuebrook and Stoneycroft
Party	Candidate	Votes	%	±%
Liberal	Steve Radford	2,919	89.15	N/A
Liberal	Hazel Williams	2,453	74.92	N/A
Liberal	Christopher Lenton	2,385	72.85	N/A
Labour	Robert Millington	633	19.33	N/A
Labour	Allen Hammond	597	19.33	N/A
Labour	James Allan	518	15.82	N/A
Liberal Democrats	John McBridge	324	9.89	N/A
Liberal Democrats	Linda Evans	304	9.29	N/A
Liberal	Deborah Mayes	213	6.51	N/A
Liberal Democrats	Ian Bull	279	8.52	N/A
Majority		N/A	N/A	N/A
Turnout		3,274	27.21	N/A
Registered electors				
Liberal win (new seat)				
