= 2019 Liverpool City Council election =

Contests for the English local authority

- 2 May 2019

30 of 90 seats (one-third) to Liverpool City Council 46 seats needed for a majority
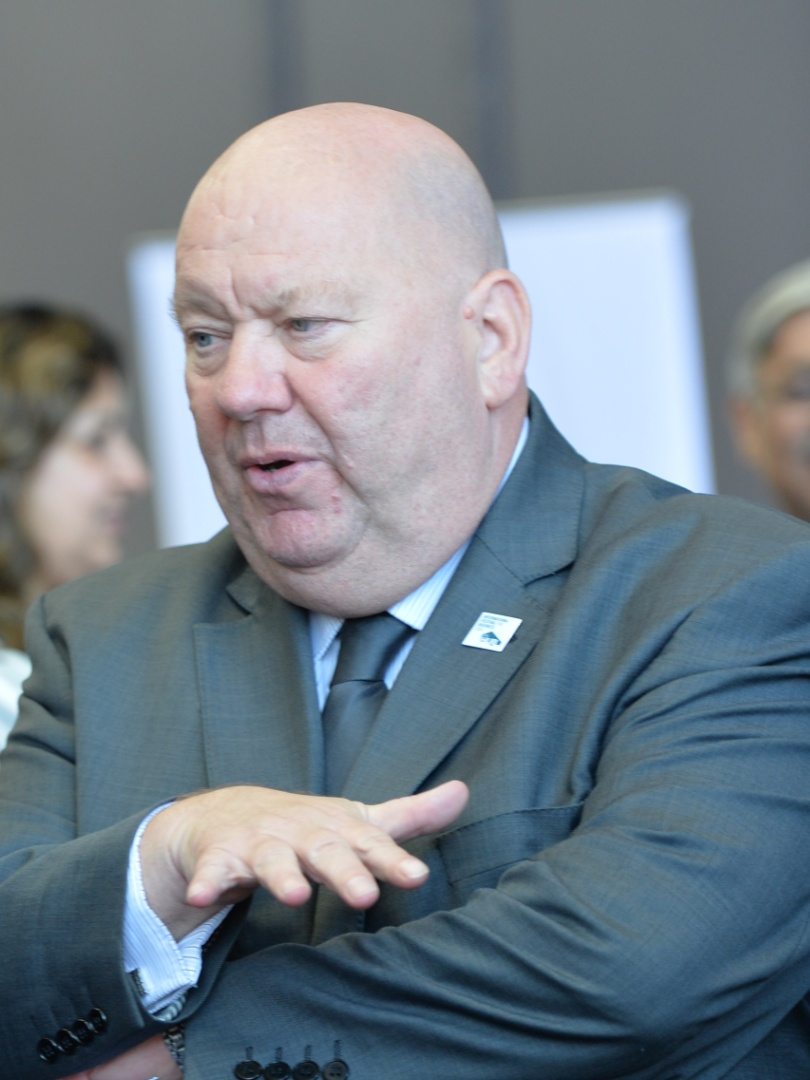

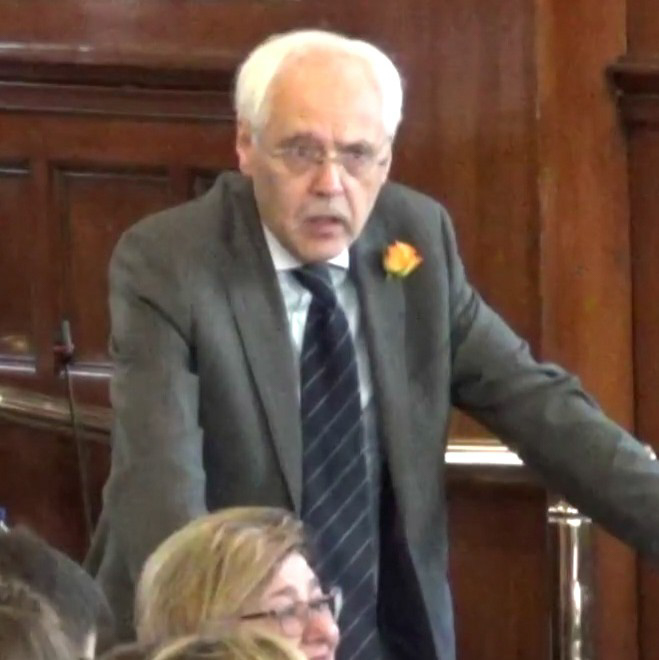

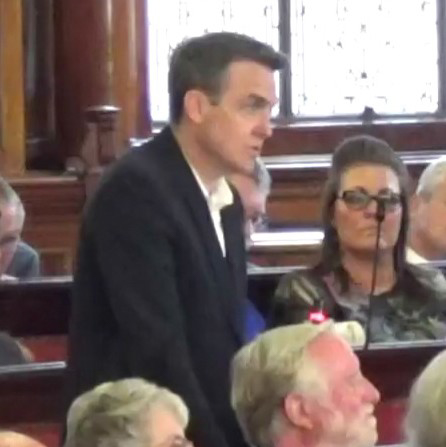

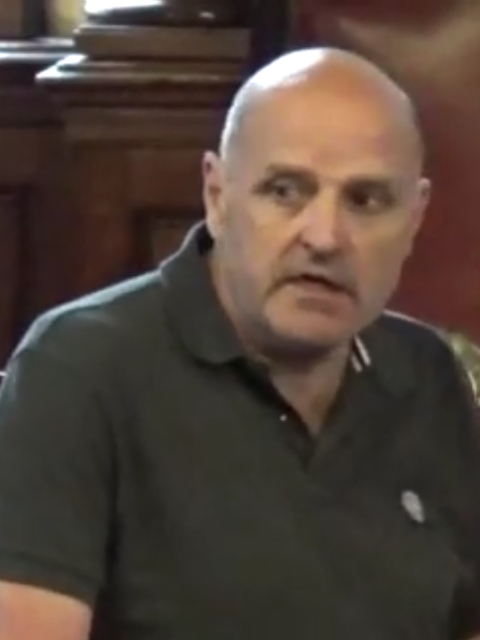
	First party	Second party	Third party
Leader	Joe Anderson	Richard Kemp	Tom Crone
Party	Labour	Liberal Democrats	Green
Leader's seat	N/A, Mayor	Church	St Michael's
Last election	25 seats, 63.8%	3 seats, 16.7%	2 seats, 9.4%
Seats before	75	8	4
Seats won	25	3	1
Seats after	72	10	4
Seat change	▼3	▲2	0
Popular vote	53,264	16,337	12,124
Percentage	59%	18%	13%
Swing	▼4.8%	▲1.4%
	Fourth party
Leader	Steve Radford
Party	Liberal
Leader's seat	Tuebrook and Stoneycroft
Last election	1 seat, 4.2%
Seats before	2
Seats won	1
Seats after	3
Seat change	▲1
Popular vote	4,120
Percentage	4%
Swing
- Map of results of 2019 election
Control of Council before election
Joe Anderson
Labour
Control of Council after Election
Joe Anderson
Labour

The 2019 Liverpool City Council election took place on 2 May 2019 to elect members of Liverpool City Council in England. This was the same day as other local elections.

Due to the 'in thirds' system of election, one third of the council were up for election, with comparisons to previous results made with the corresponding vote at the 2015 Liverpool City Council election.

== Council composition ==
Prior to the election the composition of the council was:

↓
75	8	4	2	1
Lab	LD	G	L	I

After the election the composition of the council was:

↓
72	10	4	3	1
Lab	LD	G	L	I

== Retiring councillors ==
Council Ward	Departing Councillor	Party	Ref
Anfield	Adele Dowling	Labour	
Central	Sharon Sullivan	Labour	
Clubmoor	Irene Rainey	Labour	
Cressington	William Jones	Labour	
Fazakerley	Peter Clarke	Labour	
Norris Green	Alan Walker	Labour	
Picton	Paul Kenyon	Labour	
Princes Park	Alan Dean	Labour	
Riverside	Michelle Corrigan	Labour	
Tuebrook and Stoneycroft	Carol Sung	Labour	

== Parties standing and results summary ==
Liverpool City Council election result, 2019
Party	Candidates						Votes		
Party	Stood	Elected	Gained	Unseated	Net	% of total	%	No.	Net %
Labour	30	25	0	3	-3	83	58.77	53,264	-4.8
Liberal Democrats	30	3	2	0	+2	10	18.02	16,337	+1.4
Green	30	1	0	0	0	3	13.38	12,124	
Liberal	22	1	1	0	+1	3	4.55	4,120	
Conservative	30	0	0	0	0	0	3.99	3,620	
UKIP	3	0	0	0	0	0	0.72	653	
Socialist	2	0	0	0	0	0	0.14	131	
Women's Equality	1	0	0	0	0	0	0.06	57	
Democrats and Veterans	1	0	0	0	0	0	0.08	75	
Old Swan Against the Cuts	1	0	0	0	0	0	0.09	84	
Independent	2	0	0	0	0	0	0.19	172	

== Ward results ==
=== Allerton and Hunts Cross ===
Allerton and Hunts Cross
Party	Candidate	Votes	%	±%
Labour	Sharon Connor *	2,318	50.64	▲6.32
Liberal Democrats	Fiona McBride	1,709	37.34	▼5.24
Green	Maggi Williams	337	7.36	▲1.88
Conservative	Denise Nutall	213	4.65	▼2.99
Majority		609	13.31	
Registered electors		11,565		
Turnout		4,613	39.89	▲3.14
Rejected ballots		36	0.78	▲0.64
Labour hold		Swing	▲6.3	

=== Anfield ===
Anfield
Party	Candidate	Votes	%	±%
Labour	Lena Simic	1,448	73.28	▼6.73
Green	Harry Glen Gallimore-King	193	9.77	▲4.63
Liberal	James Richardson	141	7.14	▲4.61
Liberal Democrats	James Liam Madine	97	4.91	▼1.12
Conservative	Irene Stuart	97	4.91	▼1.39
Majority		1,255	63.51	
Registered electors		9,172		
Turnout		2,000	21.81	▼2.38
Rejected ballots		24	1.20	▲0.89
Labour hold		Swing	▼6.72	

=== Belle Vale ===
Belle Vale
Party	Candidate	Votes	%	±%
Labour	Helen Thompson	2,113	70.62	▼11.98
UKIP	Douglas Anthony Boffey	310	10.36	
Liberal Democrats	Stephen David Atkinson	198	6.62	▼0.67
Green	Hilary Brenda McDonagh	174	5.82	▲2.80
Conservative	Wendy Rose Hine	107	3.58	▼2.23
Socialist Alternative	Roy Dixon	62	2.07	
Liberal	Marjorie Peel	28	0.94	▼0.35
Majority		1,803	60.26	
Registered electors		11,581		
Turnout		3,004	25.94	▼1.18
Rejected ballots		12	0.40	▼0.11
Labour hold		Swing	▼11.8	

=== Central ===
Central
Party	Candidate	Votes	%	±%
Labour	Maria Toolan	914	60.13	▼7.81
Green	Jayne Louise Stephanie Clough	340	22.37	▲10.77
Liberal Democrats	Sam Buist	144	9.47	▲1.89
Conservative	Lee David Berry	101	6.64	▼0.88
Liberal	Bethan Hazel Williams	21	1.38	
Majority		574	37.76	
Registered electors		9,585		
Turnout		1,536	16.03	▼0.07
Rejected ballots		16	1.04	▲0.85
Labour hold		Swing	▼7.77	

=== Childwall ===
Childwall
Party	Candidate	Votes	%	±%
Liberal Democrats	Alan Peter Tormey	2,421	52.41	▲3.80
Labour	Jeremy Wolfson *	1,780	38.54	▼4.69
Green	David Ronald Teasdale	252	5.46	▲1.50
Conservative	David Jeffery	109	2.36	▼0.96
Women's Equality	Erika Raffle-Currie	57	1.23	
Majority		641	13.88	
Registered electors		10,807		
Turnout		4,641	42.94	▲0.96
Rejected ballots		22	0.47	▲0.23
Liberal Democrats gain from Labour		Swing		

=== Church ===
Church
Party	Candidate	Votes	%	±%
Liberal Democrats	Richard Kemp	2,859	60.32	▲2.33
Labour	Nat Griffin	1,313	27.70	▼3.88
Green	Julie Elizabeth Birch-Holt	486	10.25	▲3.38
Conservative	James Craig	82	1.73	▼1.83
Majority		1,546	32.62	
Registered electors		10,490		
Turnout		4,770	45.47	▲1.37
Rejected ballots		30	0.63	▲0.52
Liberal Democrats hold		Swing	▲2.32	

=== Clubmoor ===
Clubmoor
Party	Candidate	Votes	%	±%
Labour	Sarah Jane Morton	1,770	74.24	▼8.84
Liberal	Paul Wynne Jones	203	8.52	▲3.58
Green	Helen Parker-Jervis	195	8.18	▲4.13
Liberal Democrats	Sean Robertson	118	4.95	▲2.03
Conservative	Peter Andrew	98	4.11	▼0.83
Majority		1,567	65.73	
Registered electors		11,121		
Turnout		2,416	21.72	▼1.25
Rejected ballots		32	1.32	▲0.86
Labour hold		Swing	▼8.86	

=== County ===
County
Party	Candidate	Votes	%	±%
Labour	Roy Gladden	1,635	77.64	▼9.00
Green	Linda Jones	199	9.45	▲6.02
Liberal Democrats	Alex Cottrell	153	7.26	▲0.97
Conservative	Olivia Georgina Lever	62	2.94	▼0.70
Liberal	Irene Morrison	57	2.71	
Majority		1,436	68.19	
Registered electors		9,329		
Turnout		2,134	22.87	▼2.00
Rejected ballots		28	1.31	▲0.89
Labour hold		Swing	▼8.96	

=== Cressington ===
Cressington
Party	Candidate	Votes	%	±%
Labour	Sam Gorst	1,896	42.64	▼9.80
Liberal Democrats	Norman Mills	1,826	41.06	▲7.46
Green	Jean-Paul Roberts	514	11.56	▲4.22
Conservative	Christopher Hall	211	4.74	▼1.88
Majority		70	1.57	
Registered electors		11,659		
Turnout		4,482	38.44	▼1.85
Rejected ballots		35	0.78	▲0.70
Labour hold		Swing	▼10.24	

=== Croxteth ===
Croxteth
Party	Candidate	Votes	%	±%
Labour	Joann Kushner	1,670	73.12	▼9.76
Green	Rachael Blackman-Stretton	215	9.41	▲5.54
Conservative	Alice Margaret Day	146	6.39	▼0.33
Liberal	Ray Catesby	128	5.60	▲2.63
Liberal Democrats	William Barrow	125	5.47	▲1.92
Majority		1,455	63.70	
Registered electors		10,532		
Turnout		2,318	22.01	▼2.30
Rejected ballots		34	1.47	▲1.12
Labour hold		Swing		

=== Everton ===
Everton
Party	Candidate	Votes	%	±%
Labour	Jane Corbett *	2,036	82.60	▼4.01
Green	Samuel James Cassidy	201	8.15	▲4.38
Liberal Democrats	Susan Kennaugh-Dyson	96	3.89	▲1.67
Conservative	David William Murray	68	2.76	▼2.37
Liberal	Linda Roberts	64	2.60	▲0.33
Majority		1,835	74.44	
Registered electors		10,722		
Turnout		2,500	23.32	▼1.46
Rejected ballots		35	1.40	▲0.91
Labour hold		Swing		

=== Fazakerley ===
Fazakerley
Party	Candidate	Votes	%	±%
Labour	Frazer Lake	1,897	77.11	▼6.06
Green	Luke Anthony Burke	208	8.46	▲4.14
Conservative	Giselle Henrietta McDonald	159	6.46	▼0.17
Liberal Democrats	Joseph Robert Slupsky	115	4.67	▲0.63
Liberal	Brenda Edwards	81	3.29	▲1.46
Majority		1,689	68.66	
Registered electors		11,221		
Turnout		2,502	22.30	▼1.49
Rejected ballots		42	1.68	▲1.34
Labour hold		Swing		

=== Greenbank ===
Greenbank
Party	Candidate	Votes	%	±%
Labour	Laura Robertston-Collins *	1,757	52.70	▲7.24
Green	Kay Alexandra Inckle	1,377	41.30	▼6.94
Liberal Democrats	Dewi Anthony John	105	3.15	▼0.25
Conservative	Nicholas John Leigh Basson	74	2.22	▼0.68
Liberal	Donald MacRitchie	21	0.63	
Majority		380	11.40	
Registered electors		8,721		
Turnout		3,362	38.55	▼0.45
Rejected ballots		28	0.83	▲0.54
Labour hold		Swing		

=== Kensington and Fairfield ===
Kensington and Fairfield
Party	Candidate	Votes	%	±%
Labour	Wendy Simon *	1,484	69.54	▼6.53
UKIP	Thomas Kangley	161	7.54	
Liberal Democrats	Pat Moloney	160	7.50	▲2.76
Green	Rebecca Lawson	139	6.51	▼1.19
Liberal	Damien Patrick Daly	83	3.89	▲0.96
Conservative	Brian James Jones	56	2.62	▼1.03
Independent	Joe Owens	51	2.39	▼2.52
Majority		1,323	62.00	
Registered electors		9,206		
Turnout		2,146	23.31	▼1.69
Rejected ballots		12	0.56	▲0.09
Labour hold		Swing		

=== Kirkdale ===
Kirkdale
Party	Candidate	Votes	%	±%
Labour	Lisa Gaughan	1,935	78.63	▼3.52
UKIP	Corinna Christine Allen	182	7.40	
Green	Jonathan Richard Clatworthy	149	6.05	▲1.97
Liberal Democrats	Mike McAllister-Bell	95	3.86	▲0.88
Socialist Alternative	Roger Bannister	69	2.80	▼3.04
Conservative	Katie Maria Burgess	31	1.26	▼2.78
Majority		1,753	71.23	
Registered electors		11,208		
Turnout		2,468	22.02	▼0.47
Rejected ballots		7	0.28	▼0.03
Labour hold		Swing		

=== Knotty Ash ===
Knotty Ash
Party	Candidate	Votes	%	±%
Labour Co-op	Harry Doyle *	1,778	69.70	▼0.06
Liberal Democrats	Graham Hughes	264	10.35	▼1.35
Green	Fiona Margaret McGill Coyne	231	9.06	▲3.56
Conservative	Mark Butchard	189	7.41	▼2.29
Liberal	Kenneth Russell	89	3.49	▲0.69
Majority		1,514	59.35	
Registered electors		10,466		
Turnout		2,583	24.68	▼0.08
Rejected ballots		32	1.24	▲0.93
Labour Co-op hold		Swing		

=== Mossley Hill ===
Mossley Hill
Party	Candidate	Votes	%	±%
Labour	Patrick Hurley *	1,746	42.72	▼2.92
Liberal Democrats	Robert Charles McAllister-Bell	1,363	33.35	▼1.69
Green	Ted Grant	729	17.84	▲7.29
Conservative	Christopher Andrew Roland	166	4.06	▼2.17
Liberal	David Stanley Wood	83	2.03	▼0.51
Majority		383	9.37	
Registered electors		9,455		
Turnout		4,118	43.55	▼0.85
Rejected ballots		31	0.75	▲0.59
Labour hold		Swing		

=== Norris Green ===
Prospective Labour candidate Liam Moore stepped down over allegations of anti-Semitism and homophobia.

Norris Green
Party	Candidate	Votes	%	±%
Labour	George Knibb	2,079	80.80	▼5.03
Green	Martyn Madeley	237	9.21	▲4.01
Conservative	Alma McGing	115	4.47	▼0.36
Liberal Democrats	Angela Hulme	85	3.30	▲1.03
Liberal	Colin Edwards	57	2.22	▲0.35
Majority		1,842	71.59	
Registered electors		12,433		
Turnout		2,603	20.94	▼1.98
Rejected ballots		30	1.15	▲0.61
Labour hold		Swing		

=== Old Swan ===
Old Swan
Party	Candidate	Votes	%	±%
Labour	Peter Brennan *	2,021	72.36	▼2.63
Green	George Maxwell	218	7.81	▲3.11
Liberal	Mick Coyne	215	7.70	▲3.35
Liberal Democrats	Norman Darbyshire	166	5.94	▲0.36
Conservative	Derek Thomas Nuttall	89	3.19	▼1.78
Old Swan Against the Cuts	Martin Ralph	84	3.01	▼2.41
Majority		1,803	64.55	
Registered electors		11,201		
Turnout		2,818	25.16	▼0.74
Rejected ballots		25	0.89	▲0.51
Labour hold		Swing		

=== Picton ===
Picton
Party	Candidate	Votes	%	±%
Labour	Abdul Qadir *	1,556	69.84	▼13.75
Green	Sophie Brown	339	15.22	▲9.20
Liberal Democrats	Stephen Brauner	167	7.50	▲3.69
Conservative	Joshua Forrester	96	4.31	▲1.02
Liberal	Alan Oscroft	70	3.14	▲2.23
Majority		1,217	54.62	
Registered electors		10,059		
Turnout		2,250	22.37	▼0.83
Rejected ballots		22	0.98	▲0.46
Labour hold		Swing		

=== Princes Park ===
Princes Park
Party	Candidate	Votes	%	±%
Labour	Tomas Logan	1,926	72.13	▼6.66
Green	Stephanie Louise Pitchers	490	18.35	▲5.66
Liberal Democrats	Thomas Sebire	144	5.39	▲0.93
Conservative	Beryl Pinnington	81	3.03	▼1.02
Liberal	Barbara Lever	29	1.09	
Majority		1,436	53.78	
Registered electors		10,778		
Turnout		2,696	25.01	▼0.69
Rejected ballots		26	0.96	▲0.31
Labour hold		Swing		

=== Riverside ===
Riverside
Party	Candidate	Votes	%	±%
Labour	Sarah Doyle	2,336	70.04	▼9.42
Green	Sally Newey	487	14.60	▲5.53
Liberal Democrats	Anna McCracken	214	6.42	▲0.89
Conservative	Graham Kenwright	149	4.47	▼1.46
Independent	Robin Singleton	121	3.63	
Liberal	Lindsey Janet Mary Wood	28	0.84	
Majority		1,849	55.44	
Registered electors		14,464		
Turnout		3,366	23.27	▲0.07
Rejected ballots		31	0.92	▲0.53
Labour hold		Swing		

=== Speke–Garston ===
Speke–Garston
Party	Candidate	Votes	%	±%
Labour	Mary Rasmussen *	2,365	79.84	▼2.99
Green	Jonathan Key	299	10.09	▲4.31
Liberal Democrats	Wiebke Ruterjans	178	6.01	▲0.22
Conservative	Michael Borman	120	4.05	▼1.55
Majority		2,066	69.75	
Registered electors		13,781		
Turnout		2,996	21.74	▼1.36
Rejected ballots		34	1.13	▲0.85
Labour hold		Swing		

=== St Michaels ===
St Michaels
Party	Candidate	Votes	%	±%
Green	Anna Key *	2,458	66.96	▲8.64
Labour	Calvin Wesley Smeda	1,011	27.54	▼9.35
Liberal Democrats	Chris Collins	116	3.16	▲0.99
Conservative	David Patmore	86	2.34	▼0.28
Majority		1,447	39.42	
Registered electors		9,642		
Turnout		3,693	38.30	▼0.30
Rejected ballots		22	0.60	▲0.38
Green hold		Swing		

=== Tuebrook and Stoneycroft ===
Tuebrook and Stoneycroft
Party	Candidate	Votes	%	±%
Liberal	Joe Dunne	2,132	67.96	▲3.92
Labour	Rona Ellen Heron	798	25.44	▼7.12
Green	Martin Sydney Dobson	93	2.96	▲1.77
Liberal Democrats	Jenny Goulding	82	2.61	▲1.35
Conservative	Luke Andrew Hingley-Smith	32	1.02	▲0.08
Majority		1,334	42.52	
Registered electors		10,253		
Turnout		3,151	30.73	▼7.27
Rejected ballots		14	0.44	▲0.27
Liberal gain from Labour		Swing		

=== Warbreck ===
Warbreck
Party	Candidate	Votes	%	±%
Labour Co-op	Ann O'Byrne *	2,240	80.58	▲0.62
Green	Noël Jane Little	221	7.95	▲3.61
Liberal Democrats	Gerard George Thompson	156	5.61	▼2.2
Conservative	McLean Campbell Patrick Wickham	105	3.78	▼2.77
Liberal	George Blacklock Roberts	58	2.09	▲0.78
Majority		2,019	72.63	
Registered electors		11,064		
Turnout		2,827	25.55	▼0.65
Rejected ballots		47	1.66	▲1.22
Labour Co-op hold		Swing		

=== Wavertree ===
Wavertree
Party	Candidate	Votes	%	±%
Labour	Dave Cummings *	1,841	52.90	▼9.56
Liberal Democrats	Graham Hulme	716	20.57	▲1.35
Green	David William Morgan	562	16.15	▲7.23
Conservative	Stuart Wood	144	4.14	▼3.13
Liberal	David Seth Harrap	142	4.08	▲1.96
Democrats and Veterans	Adam Giles Heatherington	75	2.16	NEW
Majority		1,125	32.33	
Registered electors		10,439		
Turnout		3,502	33.55	▲1.11
Rejected ballots		22	0.63	▲0.28
Labour hold		Swing		

=== West Derby ===
West Derby
Party	Candidate	Votes	%	±%
Labour	Daniel Barrington *	2,039	68.17	▼1.70
Liberal Democrats	Paul John Twigger Parr	265	8.86	▲0.76
Green	Elke Weissmann	247	8.26	▲4.92
Liberal	Ann Hines	241	8.06	▼0.48
Conservative	Pauline Shuttleworth	199	6.65	▼2.01
Majority		1,774	59.31	
Registered electors		10,939		
Turnout		3,024	27.64	▼1.70
Rejected ballots		33	1.09	▲0.90
Labour hold		Swing		

=== Woolton ===
Woolton
Party	Candidate	Votes	%	±%
Liberal Democrats	Barbara Mace	2,042	48.68	▼1.79
Labour	Alice Bennett *	1,550	36.95	▲4.19
Green	Jennifer Mary Brown	314	7.49	▲2.17
Conservative	Christopher David Thomas	289	6.89	▼4.58
Majority		492		
Registered electors		10,699		
Turnout		4,226	39.50	▼0.6
Rejected ballots		31		
Liberal Democrats gain from Labour		Swing		

=== Yew Tree ===
Yew Tree
Party	Candidate	Votes	%	±%
Labour	Barbara Murray *	2,012	74.93	▼6.40
Green	William Ward	220	8.19	▲5.06
Liberal Democrats	Jacqueline Wilson	158	5.88	▲1.94
Liberal	Sam Hawksford	149	5.55	▲2.18
Conservative	Gillian Michelle Ferrigno	146	5.44	▼2.78
Majority		1,792	66.74	
Registered electors		11,719		
Turnout		2,717	23.18	▼1.99
Rejected ballots		32	1.18	▲0.94
Labour hold		Swing		

== By Elections ==
=== Old Swan 19 September 2019 ===
Caused by the resignation of Cllr. Peter Brennan (Labour, last elected 2 May 2019)

Old Swan
Party	Candidate	Votes	%	±%
Labour	William Shortall	1,153	55.4	▼17.0
Liberal	Mick Coyne	293	14.1	▲6.4
Liberal Democrats	Chris Lea	272	13.1	▲7.2
Old Swan Against the Cuts	Martin Ralph	138	6.6	▲3.6
Green	George Duncan	130	6.2	▼1.6
Conservative	Peter Andrew	96	4.6	▲1.4
Majority		860	41.3	▼23.3
Registered electors		11,207		
Turnout		18.7	2,096	▼6.5
Rejected ballots		14	0.7	▼0.2
Labour hold		Swing	▼11.7	

=== Princes Park 17 October 2019 ===
Caused by the resignation of Cllr. Tim Moore (Labour, last elected 5 May 2016)

Princes Park
Party	Candidate	Votes	%	±%
Labour	Joanne Marie Anderson	1,259	73.1%	
Green	Stephanie Louise Pitchers	237	13.8%	
Liberal Democrats	Lee James Rowlands	148	8.59%	
Conservative	Alma Gavine McGing	79	4.59%	
Majority		1,022		
Registered electors		10,921		
Turnout		1,723	15.92%	
Rejected ballots		16		
Labour hold		Swing		

=== Clubmoor 12 December 2019 ===
Caused by the resignation of Cllr. James Noakes (Labour, last elected 5 May 2016)

Clubmoor
Party	Candidate	Votes	%	±%
Labour	Tim Jeeves	6,276	86%	
Liberal	Paul Wynne Jones	420	5.8%	
Green	Michael Christopher Stretton	328	4.5%	
Liberal Democrats	Stephen Fitzsimmons	243	3.3%	
Majority		5,856		
Registered electors		11,258		
Turnout		7,407	66%	
Rejected ballots		140		
Labour hold		Swing		

=== Picton 12 December 2019 ===
Caused by the resignation of Cllr. Paul Kenyon (Labour, last elected 3 May 2018) following allegations of anti-semitism in the Labour Party.

Picton
Party	Candidate	Votes	%	±%
Labour	Calvin Wesley Smeda	5,196	79%	
Green	Sophie Brown	457	7%	
Conservative	Chris Hall	362	5.5%	
Liberal Democrats	Jenny Turner	336	5.1%	
Liberal	Alan Oscroft	108	1.7%	
Independent	Adam Heatherington	81	1.2%	
Majority		4,739		
Registered electors		11,536		
Turnout		6,579	57%	
Rejected ballots		39		
Labour hold		Swing		

== See also ==
- Liverpool City Council
- Liverpool Town Council elections 1835 - 1879
- Liverpool City Council elections 1880–present
- Mayors and Lord Mayors of Liverpool 1207 to present
- History of local government in England
- Elections in the United Kingdom
