= Steve Radford =

British politician and leader of the Liberal Party

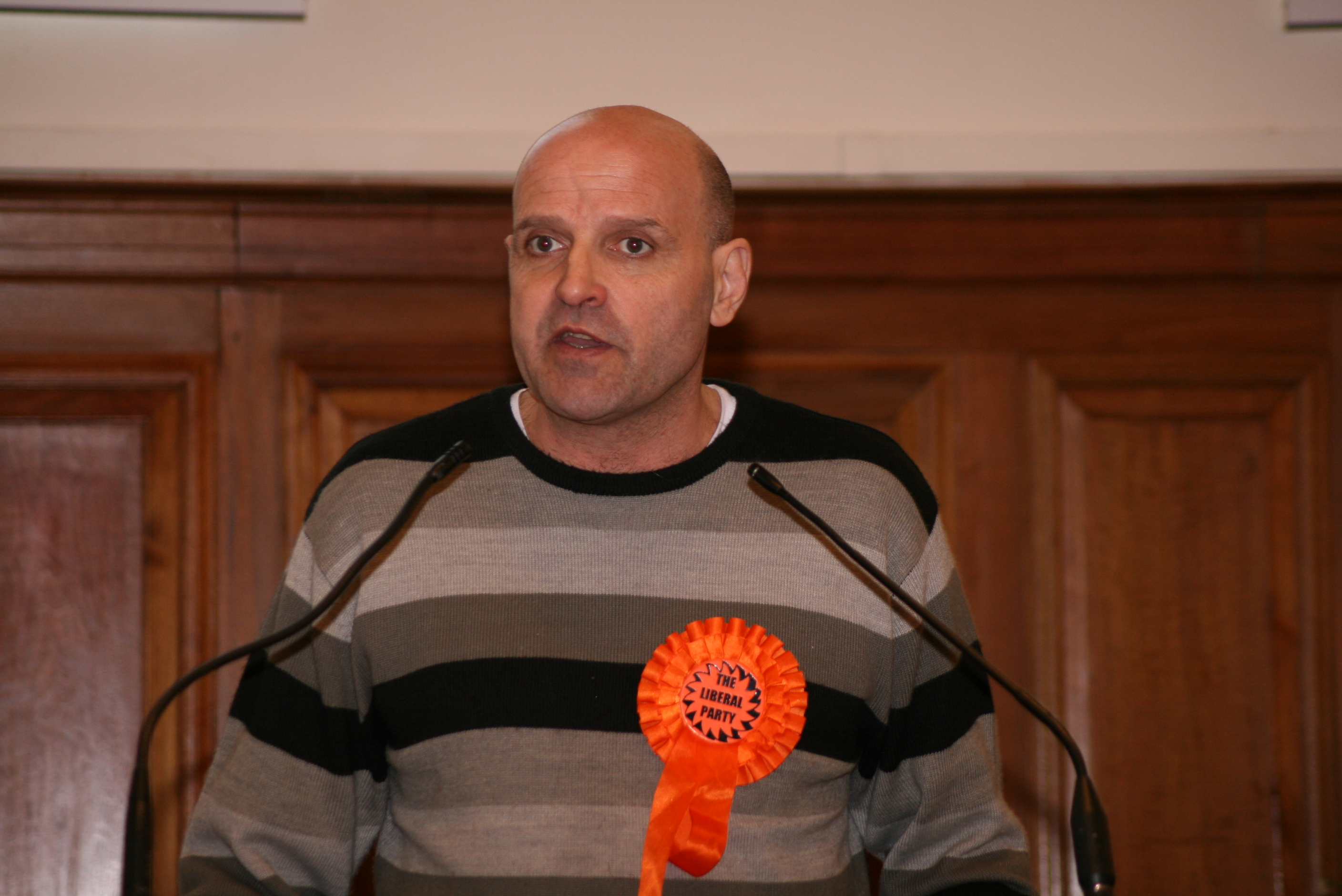
- Radford in 2008

Leader of the Liberal Party
- Incumbent
- Assumed office 2010
- Preceded by: Rob Wheway

Member of Liverpool City Council
- Incumbent
- Assumed office 1984
- Ward: Stoneycroft

Personal details
- Born: 1957 (age 68–69)
- Party: Liberal
- Occupation: Politician

Stephen Richard Radford (born 1957) is a British politician who has served as the leader of the Liberal Party since 2010, having previously held the role from 2005 to 2009. He has served on Liverpool City Council since 1984, now as councillor for the Stoneycroft ward. Radford is a founder member of the post-1989 Liberal Party, which was formed by members who opposed the merger of the original Liberal Party with the Social Democratic Party (SDP).

Radford has stood as a parliamentary candidate for Liverpool West Derby in several general elections and contested the Liverpool mayoral election in 2021 when he finished fifth. He has also managed the Tuebrook Hope Centre and worked for three decades in human resources for the telecommunications company Plessey.

== Career ==
Radford was first elected to Liverpool City Council for the Liberal Party in 1984, representing the Tuebrook ward. Following the Liberals' merger with the SDP, he stood in Tuebrook in the 1988 local elections as a candidate for the Liberal Party and Local – as distinct from the Social Liberal Democrats – and has remained with them ever since. After boundary changes were introduced in 2023 Radford was elected as councillor for Stoneycroft. As of 2026 he remains active in politics in Liverpool. He has advocated for lower bills and parking charges, campaigned against proliferation of HMOs, removal if the West Derby Road Congestion scheme and additional rating of long term derelicts

Radford has contested elections in the constituency of Liverpool West Derby on multiple occasions. At the 2005 general election, he stood as the Liberal Party candidate and received 3,606 votes, finishing third behind Labour and the Liberal Democrats with a 47.2% turnout. He contested the same constituency at the 2024 general election where he received 2,336 votes and finished behind Labour, Reform UK and the Green Party. Radford has also stood in mayoral elections. In the 2021 Liverpool mayoral election, he received 7,135 votes.

== Personal life ==
Steve Radford is the first openly gay councillor elected to Liverpool City Council. He has been a prominent advocate for the LGBTQ community in Merseyside, involved in the development of Liverpool's Gay Quarter and serving as a member of the Lesbian and Gay Christian Movement. He has also spoken on behalf of the Liverpool Gay Village Business Association.

He also spoke at the Stanley Street vigil and organised the Gay Quarter Pride

Radford has appeared on BBC One's The Big Questions where he debated topics like the national police DNA database. He is also a vocal supporter of the NO2ID campaign.
