= 2018 United Kingdom local elections =

- 3 May 2018

150 of 404 councils in England 6 directly elected mayors
- Turnout: 35.0%
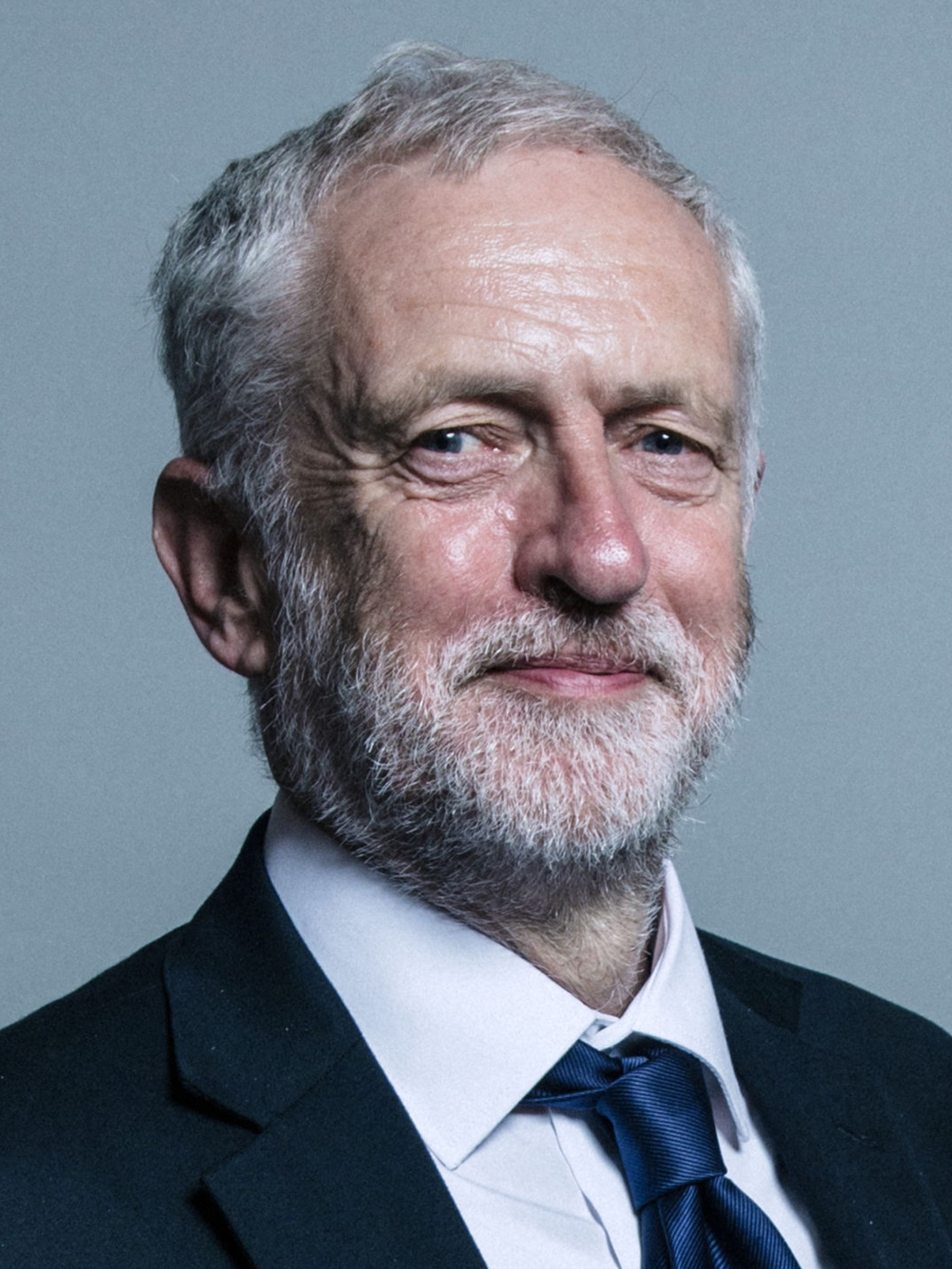

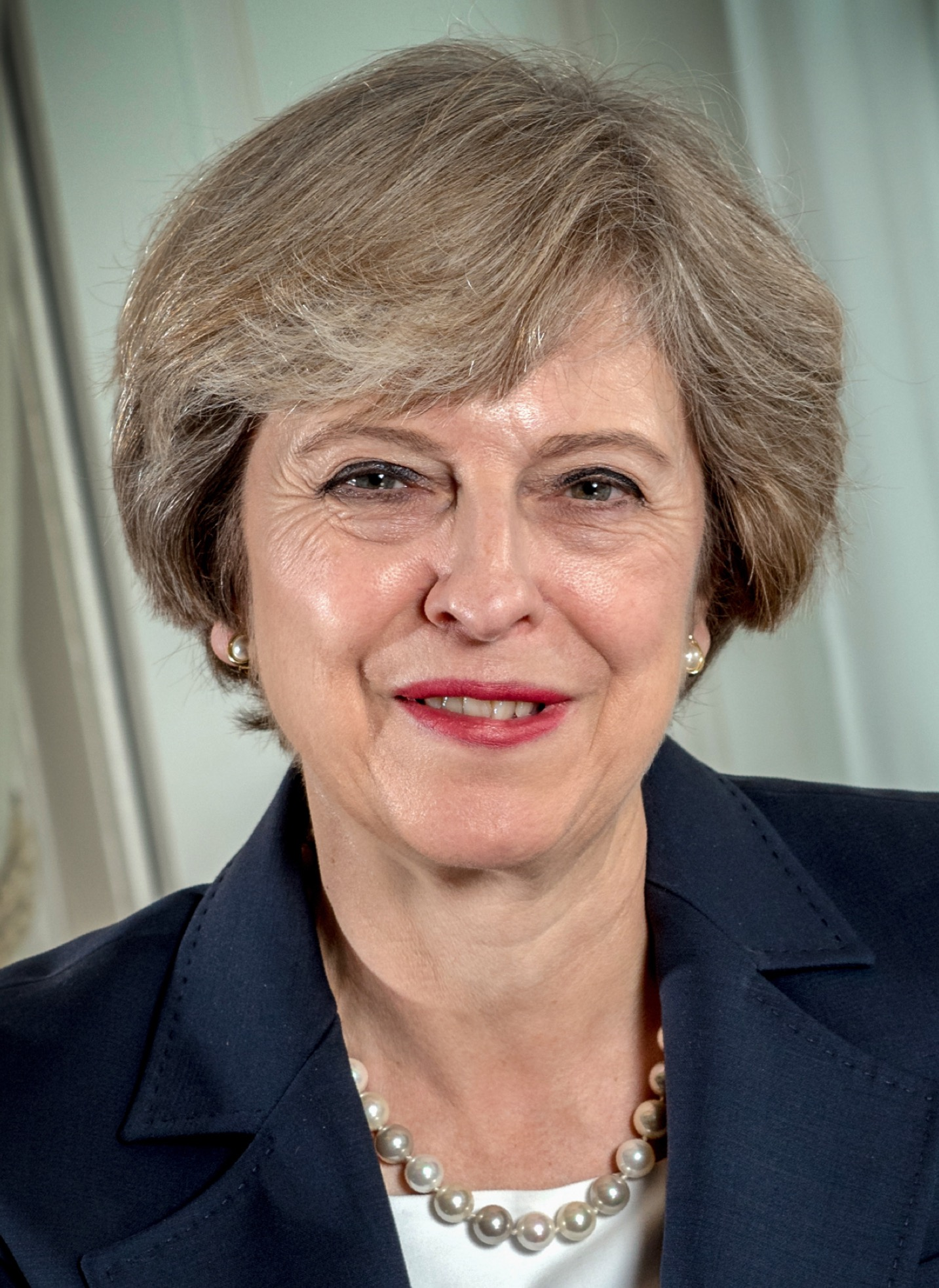

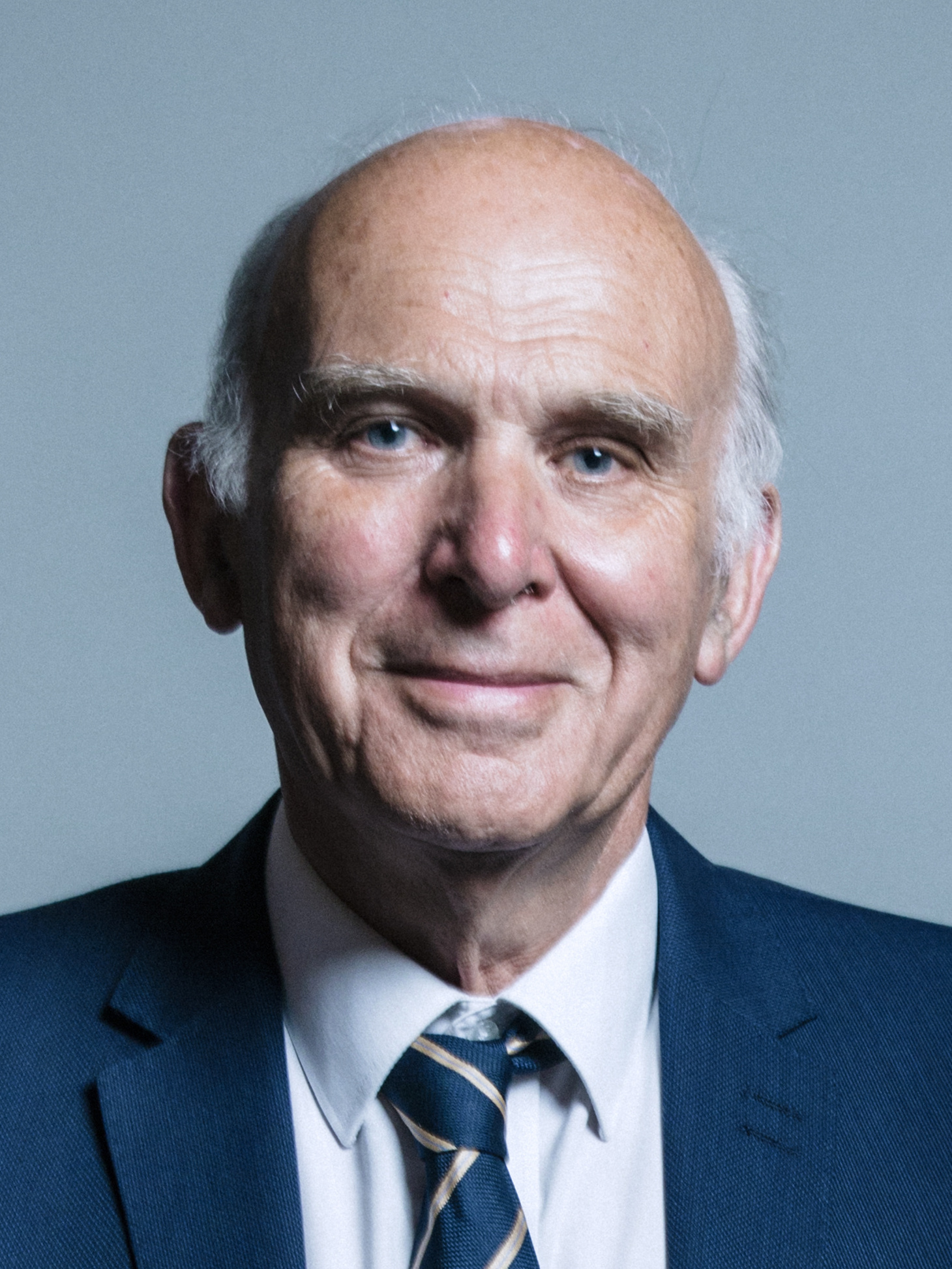
| Leader | Jeremy Corbyn | Theresa May | Vince Cable |
| Party | Labour | Conservative | Liberal Democrats |
| Leader since | 12 September 2015 | 11 July 2016 | 20 July 2017 |
| Seats before | 6,465 seats 105 councils | 9,211 seats 202 councils | 1,840 seats 7 councils |
| Projected vote share (Note: All vote shares in the infobox are projected national vote shares calculated by the BBC.) | 35% ▲8% | 35% ▼3% | 16% ▼2% |
| Seats won (2018) | 2,353; 74 councils | 1,332; 46 councils | 542; 9 councils |
| Councillors (after) | 6,495; 105 councils | 9,118; 199 councils | 1,889; 11 councils |
| Net change (notional) | ▲79; 0 councils | ▼35 ▼3 councils | ▲76 ▲4 councils |
- Map showing council control following the election. Conservative: Labour: Liberal Democrats: No overall control: No election

The 2018 United Kingdom local elections were held on Thursday 3 May 2018, with local council elections taking place in all 32 London boroughs, 34 metropolitan boroughs, 67 district and borough councils and 17 unitary authorities. There were also direct elections for the mayoralties of Hackney, Lewisham, Newham, Tower Hamlets and Watford.

With the exception of those areas that have had boundary changes, the seats up for election were last contested in the 2014 local elections.

A parliamentary by-election in West Tyrone took place the same day. Various other local by-elections also took place.

== Seats held prior to the election ==
According to a BBC News estimate, taking into account boundary changes, the major political parties are effectively defending the following 'notional' numbers of council seats on election day:

- Labour Party – 2,278 seats
- Conservative Party – 1,365 seats
- Liberal Democrats – 462 seats
- UK Independence Party – 126 seats
- Greens – 31 seats

These numbers are how many seats each party won at the previous comparable election, generally in 2014, rather than which party held the seat on the eve of the election. Some other news agencies, such as the Press Association, compare against the party holding a seat on the eve of the election, leading to a different analysis of gains and losses.

There are also 48 Residents Associations' councillors, and 100 'other' / independent councillors.

== Eligibility to vote ==
All registered electors (British, Irish, Commonwealth and European Union citizens) aged 18 or over on polling day were entitled to vote in the local elections. A person with two homes (such as a university student having a term-time address and living at home during holidays) was able to register to vote at both addresses as long as the addresses were not in the same electoral area, and was able to vote in the local elections for the two different local councils.

In certain councils, there was a trial system in place where photo ID was required to vote. These councils were: Swindon, Gosport, Woking, Bromley, and Watford. An estimated 4,000 electors were turned away from polling stations across these trial areas as a result of not having the appropriate form of ID.

== Results ==
The number of councils controlled by each party following the election are shown in the table below. Both Labour and the Liberal Democrats made modest gains in terms of their respective number of councillors, whereas the Conservatives made a net loss of 35 seats. UKIP lost nearly all of the 126 seats they were defending, with only 3 councillors elected. The turnout for the election was 35.0%.

=== Overall results ===
| Party | Councillors | | | Councils | | |
| Party | Won | After | +/- (Note: Because the number of council seats shifts every year due to boundary changes and local government reorganisation, changes are notional changes calculated by the BBC.) | Won | After | +/- |
|---|---|---|---|---|---|---|
| Conservative | 1,332 | 9,118 | ▼35 | 46 | 199 | ▼3 |
| Labour | 2,353 | 6,495 | ▲79 | 74 | 105 | Steady |
| Liberal Democrats | 542 | 1,889 | ▲76 | 9 | 11 | ▲4 |
| SNP | —N/a (Note: There were no elections in Scotland in 2018.) | 430 | Steady | 0 | 0 | Steady |
| Plaid Cymru | —N/a (Note: There were no elections in Wales in 2018.) | 203 | Steady | 0 | 0 | Steady |
| Green | 39 | 198 | ▲8 | 0 | 0 | Steady |
| UKIP | 3 | 116 | ▼123 | 0 | 0 | Steady |
| Independent | 91 | 1,645 | ▲15 | 0 | 7 | Steady |
| No overall control | —N/a | | | 21 | 82 | ▼1 |

==== Results in London ====
The following table shows the aggregate results for the 32 councils that were up for election in London.

| Party | Councillors | | Councils | |
| Party | Number | Change^{†} | Number | Change |
|---|---|---|---|---|
| Labour | 1,128 | ▲67 | 21 | ▲1 |
| Conservative | 508 | ▼92 | 7 | ▼2 |
| Liberal Democrats | 152 | ▲34 | 3 | ▲2 |
| Residents | 25 | ▼2 | 0 | Steady |
| Green | 11 | ▲7 | 0 | Steady |
| Independent | 7 | ▲5 | 0 | Steady |
| UKIP | 0 | ▼9 | 0 | Steady |
| PATH | 1 | ▲1 | 0 | Steady |
| Harold Hill Ind. | 1 | ▲1 | 0 | Steady |
| No overall control | — | | 1 | ▼1 |

^{†}Due to boundary changes, the figures for seat losses/gains are notional changes calculated by the BBC, and do not match up precisely to the London-wide results in 2014.

==== Results outside of London ====
The following table shows the aggregate results for the 118 councils that were up for election outside of London.

| Party | Councillors | | Councils | |
| Party | Number | Change | Number | Change |
|---|---|---|---|---|
| Labour | 1,225 | ▲12 | 53 | ▼1 |
| Conservative | 824 | ▲57 | 39 | ▼1 |
| Liberal Democrats | 390 | ▲42 | 6 | ▲2 |
| Independent | 89 | ▲12 | 0 | Steady |
| Green | 28 | ▲1 | 0 | Steady |
| Residents | 21 | Steady | 0 | Steady |
| UKIP | 3 | ▼114 | 0 | Steady |
| Liberal | 1 | ▼1 | 0 | Steady |
| No overall control | — | | 20 | Steady |

Only four councils switched from a majority for one party to another. The Conservatives gained Redditch from Labour, and lost control of three councils to the Liberal Democrats: Kingston upon Thames, Richmond upon Thames and South Cambridgeshire. The Liberal Democrats also gained Three Rivers District Council from no overall control. Labour gained a majority on three councils that had been under no overall control (Kirklees, Plymouth and Tower Hamlets) while losing their majority on two (Derby and Nuneaton and Bedworth). The Conservatives gained a majority on one council that had been under no overall control (Basildon) while losing their majority on two (Mole Valley and Trafford).

Labour won the inaugural mayoral election for the Sheffield City Region. Five other mayoral elections saw no change in the winning party: Labour held four and the Liberal Democrats held one.

=== Analysis ===
This was the first set of local elections since the 2017 general election. Most of the seats up for election had last been contested in the 2014 local elections.

Because the group of local councils varies with each cycle of local elections, the BBC and other analysts calculated a projected national vote share, which aims to assess what the council results indicate the UK-wide vote would be if the results were repeated at a general election. The BBC's estimate put Labour on 35% of the vote (up 8% since 2017), the Conservatives on 35% (down 3%), the Liberal Democrats on 16% (down 2%). In the May 2017 local elections, the projected national voteshare was 38% for the Conservatives, 27% for Labour, 18% for the Liberal Democrats and 5% for UKIP. When votes were still being counted, media reports widely described the result as "mixed" for both Labour and the Conservatives. The results suggested that support for the parties had not moved much since the general election 11 months earlier. Some reports considered the results a relief for Theresa May and the Conservatives.

Ben Margulies, a research fellow at the University of Warwick, noted how the UK Independence Party's collapse in vote share directly benefited the Conservatives as they committed to exiting the European Union. Margulies stated that the Conservatives' position with the electorate will "remain perched on a precipice". Matthew Mokhefi-Ashton, a politics lecturer at Nottingham Trent University, argued that Labour had set their expectations too high and thus made the actual result look disappointing by comparison. David Cutts, a professor of political science at the University of Birmingham, described the Liberal Democrats' performance in the election as "underwhelming" in contrast to the media response, arguing that the party only made moderate gains in their strongholds from before the Liberal-Conservative coalition and council areas that were seen as "Strong Remain" and "Strong Leave". Cutts argued that the next local elections in England are a greater test of their stability as they feature substantially more strongholds.

== London boroughs ==
All seats in the 32 London borough councils were up for election.

| Council | Previous control | Result |
|---|---|---|
| Barking and Dagenham | Labour | Labour |
| Barnet | No overall control (Conservative minority) | Conservative |
| Bexley | Conservative | Conservative |
| Brent | Labour | Labour |
| Bromley | Conservative | Conservative |
| Camden | Labour | Labour |
| Croydon | Labour | Labour |
| Ealing | Labour | Labour |
| Enfield | Labour | Labour |
| Greenwich | Labour | Labour |
| Hackney | Labour | Labour |
| Hammersmith and Fulham | Labour | Labour |
| Haringey | Labour | Labour |
| Harrow | Labour | Labour |
| Havering | No overall control (Conservative minority) | No overall control (Conservative minority) |
| Hillingdon | Conservative | Conservative |
| Hounslow | Labour | Labour |
| Islington | Labour | Labour |
| Kensington and Chelsea | Conservative | Conservative |
| Kingston upon Thames | Conservative | Liberal Democrats |
| Lambeth | Labour | Labour |
| Lewisham | Labour | Labour |
| Merton | Labour | Labour |
| Newham | Labour | Labour |
| Redbridge | Labour | Labour |
| Richmond upon Thames | Conservative | Liberal Democrats |
| Southwark | Labour | Labour |
| Sutton | Liberal Democrats | Liberal Democrats |
| Tower Hamlets | No overall control (Labour minority) | Labour |
| Waltham Forest | Labour | Labour |
| Wandsworth | Conservative | Conservative |
| Westminster | Conservative | Conservative |

== Metropolitan boroughs ==
=== Whole council ===
4 metropolitan boroughs had all of their seats up for election following boundary changes.

| Council | Previous control | Result |
|---|---|---|
| Birmingham | Labour | Labour |
| Leeds | Labour | Labour |
| Manchester | Labour | Labour |
| Newcastle upon Tyne | Labour | Labour |

=== One-third of council ===
One third of the seats in 30 metropolitan boroughs were up for election:

| Council | Previous control | Result |
|---|---|---|
| Barnsley | Labour | Labour |
| Bolton | Labour | Labour |
| Bradford | Labour | Labour |
| Bury | Labour | Labour |
| Calderdale | No overall control (Labour minority) | No overall control (Labour minority) |
| Coventry | Labour | Labour |
| Dudley | No overall control (Conservative minority) | No overall control (Conservative minority) |
| Gateshead | Labour | Labour |
| Kirklees | No overall control (Labour minority) | Labour |
| Knowsley | Labour | Labour |
| Liverpool | Labour | Labour |
| North Tyneside | Labour | Labour |
| Oldham | Labour | Labour |
| Rochdale | Labour | Labour |
| St Helens | Labour | Labour |
| Salford | Labour | Labour |
| Sandwell | Labour | Labour |
| Sefton | Labour | Labour |
| Sheffield | Labour | Labour |
| Solihull | Conservative | Conservative |
| South Tyneside | Labour | Labour |
| Stockport | No overall control (Labour minority) | No overall control (Labour minority) |
| Sunderland | Labour | Labour |
| Tameside | Labour | Labour |
| Trafford | Conservative | No overall control (Labour with Lib Dem support) |
| Wakefield | Labour | Labour |
| Walsall | No overall control (Conservative minority) | No overall control (Conservative minority) |
| Wigan | Labour | Labour |
| Wirral | Labour | Labour |
| Wolverhampton | Labour | Labour |

== Unitary authorities ==
=== Whole council ===
One unitary authority had all of its seats up for election following boundary changes.

| Council | Previous control | Result |
|---|---|---|
| Kingston upon Hull | Labour | Labour |

=== Third of council ===
One third of the council seats were up for election in 16 unitary authorities.

| Council | Previous control | Result |
|---|---|---|
| Blackburn with Darwen | Labour | Labour |
| Derby | Labour | No overall control (Con with UKIP and Lib Dem support) |
| Halton | Labour | Labour |
| Hartlepool | Labour | Labour |
| Milton Keynes | No overall control (Labour with Lib Dem support) | No overall control (Labour with Lib Dem support) |
| North East Lincolnshire | No overall control (Lab minority) | No overall control (Lab with Lib Dem support) |
| Peterborough | No overall control (Conservative minority) | Conservative |
| Plymouth | Conservative | Labour |
| Portsmouth | No overall control (Conservative minority) | No overall control (Lib Dem with Lab support) |
| Reading | Labour | Labour |
| Slough | Labour | Labour |
| Southampton | Labour | Labour |
| Southend-on-Sea | Conservative | Conservative |
| Swindon | Conservative | Conservative |
| Thurrock | No overall control (Conservative minority) | No overall control (Conservative minority) |
| Wokingham | Conservative | Conservative |

== Non-metropolitan districts ==
=== Whole council ===
Seven non-metropolitan districts have all of their seats up for election.

| Council | Previous control | Result |
|---|---|---|
| Eastleigh | Liberal Democrats | Liberal Democrats |
| Harrogate | Conservative | Conservative |
| Hastings | Labour | Labour |
| Huntingdonshire | Conservative | Conservative |
| Newcastle-under-Lyme | No overall control (Conservative minority) | No overall control (Conservative minority) |
| South Cambridgeshire | Conservative | Liberal Democrats |
| South Lakeland | Liberal Democrats | Liberal Democrats |

=== Half of council ===
Six non-metropolitan districts have half of their seats up for election.

| Council | Previous control | Result |
|---|---|---|
| Adur | Conservative | Conservative |
| Cheltenham | Liberal Democrats | Liberal Democrats |
| Fareham | Conservative | Conservative |
| Gosport | Conservative | Conservative |
| Nuneaton and Bedworth | Labour | No overall control (Lab minority) |
| Oxford | Labour | Labour |

=== Third of council ===
54 district councils had one third of their seats up for election. Weymouth and Portland originally had elections scheduled for 2018, but the elections were postponed indefinitely following a decision to merge the council into a unitary Dorset Council from 2019 onwards.

These were the last elections to Daventry District Council, following the decision to abolish it along with Northamptonshire County Council and its 7 district councils into two unitary authorities in 2020.

| Council | Previous control | Result |
|---|---|---|
| Amber Valley | Conservative | Conservative |
| Basildon | No overall control | Conservative |
| Basingstoke and Deane | Conservative | Conservative |
| Brentwood | Conservative | Conservative |
| Broxbourne | Conservative | Conservative |
| Burnley | Labour | Labour |
| Cambridge | Labour | Labour |
| Cannock Chase | Labour | Labour |
| Carlisle | No overall control | No overall control |
| Castle Point | Conservative | Conservative |
| Cherwell | Conservative | Conservative |
| Chorley | Labour | Labour |
| Colchester | No overall control | No overall control |
| Craven | Conservative | Conservative |
| Crawley | Labour | Labour |
| Daventry | Conservative | Conservative |
| Elmbridge | Conservative | No overall control |
| Epping Forest | Conservative | Conservative |
| Exeter | Labour | Labour |
| Great Yarmouth | Conservative | Conservative |
| Harlow | Labour | Labour |
| Hart | No overall control | No overall control |
| Havant | Conservative | Conservative |
| Hyndburn | Labour | Labour |
| Ipswich | Labour | Labour |
| Lincoln | Labour | Labour |
| Maidstone | No overall control | No overall control |
| Mole Valley | Conservative | No overall control |
| North Hertfordshire | Conservative | Conservative |
| Norwich | Labour | Labour |
| Pendle | No overall control | No overall control |
| Preston | Labour | Labour |
| Redditch | Labour | Conservative |
| Reigate and Banstead | Conservative | Conservative |
| Rochford | Conservative | Conservative |
| Rossendale | Labour | Labour |
| Rugby | Conservative | Conservative |
| Runnymede | Conservative | Conservative |
| Rushmoor | Conservative | Conservative |
| St Albans | Conservative | Conservative |
| Stevenage | Labour | Labour |
| Tamworth | Conservative | Conservative |
| Tandridge | Conservative | Conservative |
| Three Rivers | No overall control | Liberal Democrats |
| Tunbridge Wells | Conservative | Conservative |
| Watford | Liberal Democrats | Liberal Democrats |
| Welwyn Hatfield | Conservative | Conservative |
| West Lancashire | Labour | Labour |
| West Oxfordshire | Conservative | Conservative |
| Winchester | Conservative | Conservative |
| Woking | Conservative | Conservative |
| Worcester | No overall control | No overall control |
| Worthing | Conservative | Conservative |
| Wyre Forest | Conservative | Conservative |

== Mayoral elections ==
There were five local authority mayoral elections and one metropolitan mayoral election.

=== Combined authorities ===
| Combined Authority | New mayor |
|---|---|
| Sheffield City Region (South Yorkshire) | Dan Jarvis (Labour Co-op) |

=== Local authorities ===
| Council | Previous mayor | New mayor |
|---|---|---|
| Hackney | Philip Glanville (Lab) | Philip Glanville (Labour Co-op) |
| Lewisham | Sir Steve Bullock (Lab) | Damien Egan (Labour Co-op) |
| Newham | Sir Robin Wales (Lab) | Rokhsana Fiaz (Labour Co-op) |
| Tower Hamlets | John Biggs (Lab) | John Biggs (Lab) |
| Watford | Dorothy Thornhill (Lib Dem) | Peter Taylor (Lib Dem) |
