= 2018 Crawley Borough Council election =

2018 UK local government election

- 3 May 2018

12 of the 37 seats to Crawley Borough Council 19 seats needed for a majority
	First party	Second party
Party	Labour	Conservative
Seats before	20	17
Seats won	8	4
Seats after	20	17
Seat change	Steady	Steady
Popular vote	10,091	10,156
Percentage	47.1%	47.4%
- Map showing the results of the 2018 Crawley Borough Council elections by ward. Blue show Conservative seats, and red shows Labour. Wards in grey had no election.
Council control before election
Labour
Council control after election
Labour

The 2018 Crawley Borough Council election took place on 3 May 2018 to elect members of Crawley Borough Council in West Sussex, England. This was on the same day as other local elections. The Labour Party retained control of the council, with no seats changing hands.

== Ward results ==
=== Bewbush ===
Bewbush
Party	Candidate	Votes	%
Labour	Michael Gerard Jones	891	57.9
Conservative	Thomas Bidwell	452	29.4
Liberal Democrats	Sarah Smith	131	8.5
Justice Party	Arshad Khan	34	2.2
Legacy Party	Janet Elizabeth Setford-Thompson	32	2.1
Majority		439	28.5
Turnout		1,540	25
Labour hold			

=== Broadfield North ===
Broadfield North
Party	Candidate	Votes	%
Labour	Ian Irvine	822	67.3
Conservative	Irshad Jalaldeen	338	27.7
Legacy Party	Christopher James Brown	61	5.0
Majority		484	39.6
Turnout		1,221	27
Labour hold			

=== Broadfield South ===
Broadfield South
Party	Candidate	Votes	%
Labour	Tim Lunnon	652	53.8
Conservative	Jonathan Purdy	478	39.4
Legacy Party	George Paul Bird	82	6.8
Majority		174	14.4
Turnout		1,212	27
Labour hold			

=== Furnace Green ===
Furnace Green
Party	Candidate	Votes	%
Conservative	Carole Eade	1,008	48.1
Labour	Dan Dobson	976	46.5
Liberal Democrats	Harry Old	98	4.7
Legacy Party	Allan Peter Griffiths	15	0.7
Majority		32	1.6
Turnout		2,097	47
Conservative hold			

=== Ifield ===
Ifield
Party	Candidate	Votes	%
Labour	Laura-Lee Willcock	1,150	46.9
Conservative	Josh Bounds	1,141	46.5
Liberal Democrats	John Lethbridge	123	5.0
Legacy Party	Neil James Setford-Thompson	39	1.6
Majority		9	0.4
Turnout		2,453	37
Labour hold			

=== Langley Green ===
Langley Green
Party	Candidate	Votes	%
Labour	Shahzad Abbas Malik	1,124	60.7
Conservative	Kevin Hall	586	31.7
Liberal Democrats	Marko Scepanovic	141	7.6
Majority		538	29.0
Turnout		1,851	32
Labour hold			

=== Maidenbower ===
Maidenbower
Party	Candidate	Votes	%
Conservative	Nigel Boxall	1,349	69.4
Labour	Morgan Flack	546	28.1
Legacy Party	Leonard Thomas Elphick	48	2.5
Majority		803	41.3
Turnout		1,943	30
Conservative hold			

=== Northgate & West Green ===
Northgate & West Green
Party	Candidate	Votes	%
Labour	Peter Keir Lamb	821	
Conservative	Ray Ward	521	
Majority			
Turnout			
Labour hold			

=== Pound Hill North ===
Pound Hill North
Party	Candidate	Votes	%
Conservative	Richard David Burrett	1,194	66.4
Labour	Stuart Gunatillake	605	33.6
Majority		589	32.8
Turnout		1,799	33
Conservative hold			

=== Pound Hill South and Worth ===
Pound Hill South and Worth
Party	Candidate	Votes	%
Conservative	Andrew Belben	1,376	60.2
Labour	Colin Flack	911	39.8
Majority		465	20.3
Turnout		2,287	37
Conservative hold			

=== Southgate ===
Southgate
Party	Candidate	Votes	%
Labour	Raj Sharma	1,125	46.2
Conservative	Karim Khassal	1,111	45.6
Liberal Democrats	Kevin Osborne	199	8.2
Majority		14	0.6
Turnout		2,435	38
Labour hold			

=== West Green ===
West Green
Party	Candidate	Votes	%
Labour	Karen Sudan	615	48.8
Conservative	Ian Pendlington	547	43.4
Liberal Democrats	David Anderson	99	7.9
Majority		68	5.4
Turnout		1,261	34
Labour hold			
