= 2018 Mole Valley District Council election =

Mole Valley District Council election

Results of the 2018 Mole Valley District Council election

The 2018 Mole Valley District Council election took place on 3 May 2018 to elect approximately one-third of members to Mole Valley District Council in England, coinciding with other local elections. The Conservatives went into the elections with a majority of one, but lost control of the council, leaving it with no overall majority. The 2018 election results are compared (in terms of percentage points gained or lost) against the results when these wards were last contested four years previously, in 2014.

== Results ==
Mole Valley District Council election, 2018
Party	Seats	Gains	Losses	Net gain/loss	Seats %	Votes %	Votes	+/−
Liberal Democrats	6	3	1	+2	42.9	37.5	9,164	+10.3
Conservative	5	1	2	−1	35.7	37.0	9.038	−0.7
Ashtead Independents	3	0	0	0	21.4	12.1	2,943	+1.7
Labour	0	0	0	0	0.0	6.5	1,598	+3.1
Green	0	0	0	0	0.0	4.5	1,094	+1.1
UKIP	0	0	1	−1	0.0	1.3	314	−16.2
No Description	0	0	0	0	0.0	1.0	243	N/A
Democrats and Veterans	0	0	0	0	0.0	0.1	26	N/A

== Ward results ==
=== Ashtead Common ===
Ashtead Common
Party	Candidate	Votes	%	±%
Ashtead Independent	Patricia Wiltshire	836	59.7	+4.0
Conservative	Marion Bridgen	244	17.4	−11.7
Liberal Democrats	Keira Vyvyan-Robinson	172	12.3	+7.9
Labour	Caroline Gilchrist	117	8.4	N/A
Green	Steve McDonald	31	2.2	N/A
Majority		592	42.3	
Turnout			43.3	
Ashtead Independent hold		Swing		

=== Ashtead Park ===
Ashtead Park
Party	Candidate	Votes	%	±%
Ashtead Independent	Garry Stansfield	875	61.1	+15.9
Conservative	Linda St John	391	27.3	−11.8
Liberal Democrats	Hector Keun	70	4.9	N/A
Green	Susan McGrath	49	3.4	N/A
Labour	Susan Gilchrist	47	3.3	−2.5
Majority		484	33.8	
Turnout			40.8	
Ashtead Independent hold		Swing		

=== Ashtead Village ===
Ashtead Village
Party	Candidate	Votes	%	±%
Ashtead Independent	Alan Reilly	1,232	62.9	+13.3
Conservative	Fiona Reynolds	413	21.1	−14.4
Liberal Democrats	Rita Antonelli	141	7.2	N/A
Labour	Clive Scott	115	5.9	+0.4
Green	Lucy Barford	59	3.0	N/A
Majority		819	41.8	
Turnout			41.9	
Ashtead Independent hold		Swing		

=== Bookham North ===
Bookham North
Party	Candidate	Votes	%	±%
Conservative	Richard Moyse	1,108	50.4	−1.6
Liberal Democrats	Fran Pyatt	868	39.5	+21.5
Green	Ann James	118	5.4	−3.5
Labour	Bert Jones	105	4.8	+0.4
Majority		240	10.9	
Turnout			47.3	
Conservative hold		Swing		

=== Bookham South ===
Bookham South
Party	Candidate	Votes	%	±%
Liberal Democrats	Elizabeth Daly	1,179	54.5	+21.9
Conservative	Jatin Patel	835	38.6	−8.7
Green	Damian McDevitt	80	3.7	N/A
Labour	Colin Edgley	69	3.2	N/A
Majority		344	15.9	
Turnout			48.5	
Liberal Democrats gain from Conservative		Swing		

=== Brockham, Betchworth and Buckland ===
Brockham, Betchworth and Buckland
Party	Candidate	Votes	%	±%
Conservative	Simon Budd	1,063	55.9	+22.7
Liberal Democrats	Roger Abbott	661	34.8	−16.2
Labour	Rosemary Buckle	79	4.2	N/A
Green	Julian Everett	73	3.8	N/A
Democrats and Veterans	Harry Edwards	26	1.4	N/A
Majority		402	21.1	
Turnout			53.2	
Conservative gain from Liberal Democrats		Swing		

=== Capel, Leigh and Newdigate ===
Capel, Leigh and Newdigate
Party	Candidate	Votes	%	±%
Conservative	Mary Huggins	736	46.6	+4.8
Liberal Democrats	Lesley Bushnell	685	43.4	+10.5
UKIP	Geoff Cox	65	4.1	−15.6
Labour	Charlotte Dix	48	3.0	N/A
Green	Muriel Passmore	45	2.8	−2.8
Majority		51	3.2	
Turnout			45.7	
Conservative hold		Swing		

=== Dorking North ===
Dorking North
Party	Candidate	Votes	%	±%
Liberal Democrats	David Draper	989	66.6	+23.5
Conservative	Dean Beasley	247	16.6	−10.1
Green	Jacquetta Fewster	114	7.7	−5.8
Labour	James Stringer	105	7.1	+1.7
UKIP	David Payne	31	2.1	−9.1
Majority		742	50.0	
Turnout			44.5	
Liberal Democrats hold		Swing		

=== Dorking South ===
Dorking South
Party	Candidate	Votes	%	±%
Liberal Democrats	Margaret Cooksey	1,385	57.1	+12.9
Conservative	Roger Jones	634	26.1	−0.4
Labour	Frank Pemberton	203	8.4	+1.0
Green	Chris Crook	142	5.9	−3.7
UKIP	Majorie Dixon	61	2.5	−9.8
Majority		751	31.0	
Turnout			42.2	
Liberal Democrats hold		Swing		

=== Fetcham East ===
Fetcham East
Party	Candidate	Votes	%	±%
Conservative	Tracy Keeley	885	63.0	+9.6
Liberal Democrats	Ian Anderson	398	28.3	+4.7
Labour	Ann Clark	81	5.8	N/A
Green	Eugene Suggett	41	2.9	N/A
Majority		487	34.7	
Turnout			45.2	
Conservative hold		Swing		

=== Fetcham West ===
Fetcham West
Party	Candidate	Votes	%	±%
Liberal Democrats	Raj Harque	1,016	64.4	+13.3
Conservative	Hugh Broom	444	28.2	−7.3
Labour	Mark Coote	59	3.7	N/A
Green	Richard Essex	58	3.7	N/A
Majority		572	36.2	
Turnout			49.4	
Liberal Democrats hold		Swing		

=== Holmwoods ===
Holmwoods
Party	Candidate	Votes	%	±%
Liberal Democrats	Clayton Wellman	871	49.1	+22.9
Conservative	Fiona Meadows	595	33.5	+4.8
Labour	Laurence Nasskau	133	7.5	+0.6
Green	Jeff Zie	93	5.2	−1.4
UKIP	Margaret Curran	83	4.7	−26.9
Majority		276	15.6	
Turnout			36.4	
Liberal Democrats gain from UKIP		Swing		

=== Leatherhead North ===
Leatherhead North
Party	Candidate	Votes	%	±%
Liberal Democrats	Emma Cussell	729	41.9	+13.1
Conservative	Simon Moss	598	34.3	+5.2
Labour	Marc Green	275	15.8	+2.1
UKIP	Bob Cane	74	4.3	−24.1
Green	Vicki Elcoate	65	3.7	N/A
Majority		131	7.6	
Turnout			33.7	
Liberal Democrats gain from Conservative		Swing		

=== Leatherhead South ===
Leatherhead South
Party	Candidate	Votes	%	±%
Conservative	Tim Ashton	845	61.4	+7.4
No Description	Gareth Hartwell	243	17.7	N/A
Labour	Kim Coote	162	11.8	N/A
Green	David Scoffield	126	9.2	N/A
Majority		602	43.7	
Turnout			39.2	
Conservative hold		Swing		
