= 2018 Havant Borough Council election =

2018 UK local government election

- 3 May 2018

15 of 38 seats to Havant Borough Council 20 seats needed for a majority
	First party	Second party	Third party
Party	Conservative	Labour	Liberal Democrats
Seats before	31	2	1
Seats won	13	1	1
Seats after	33	2	1
Seat change	▲2	Steady	Steady
Popular vote	16,868	5,075	4,144
- Results by Ward
Council control before election
Conservative
Council control after election
Conservative

The 2018 Havant Borough Council election took place on 3 May 2018 to elect members of Havant Borough Council in England. This was on the same day as other local elections.

After the election, the composition of the council was:

- Conservative: 33
- UKIP: 2
- Labour: 2
- Liberal Democrats: 1

== Results ==
The Conservatives, Labour and Liberal Democrats all won seats this election, with the Conservatives gaining two of UKIP's four seats; the Conservatives won 13 of the 15 seats up for election, with Labour and the Liberal Democrats holding one seat each which was up for election; two seats in Hayling West were up for election.

Havant local election result 2018
Party	Seats	Gains	Losses	Net gain/loss	Seats %	Votes %	Votes	+/−
Conservative	13	2	0	▲2		61.24	16,868	
Labour	1	0	0	Steady		18.42	5,075	
Liberal Democrats	1	0	0	Steady		15.04	4,144	
Green	0	0	0	Steady	0	3.07	848	
UKIP	0	0	2	▼2	0	2.19	605	

== Ward results ==
=== Barncroft ===
Barncroft
Party	Candidate	Votes	%	±%
Conservative	Pamela Crellin	498	59.3	
Labour	Philip Pearson	268	31.9	
Liberal Democrats	Alun Williams	74	8.8	
Majority		230		
Turnout		840		
Conservative hold		Swing		

=== Battins ===
Battins
Party	Candidate	Votes	%	±%
Liberal Democrats	Johanna Lowe	384	38.6	
Conservative	David Collins	313	31.5	
Labour	Philip Munday	298	29.9	
Majority		71		
Turnout		995		
Liberal Democrats hold		Swing		

=== Bedhampton ===
Bedhampton
Party	Candidate	Votes	%	±%
Conservative	Gary Robinson	1,428	60.3	
Liberal Democrats	Philippa Gray	646	27.3	
Labour	Sheree Earnshaw	296	12.5	
Majority		782		
Turnout		2,370		
Conservative hold		Swing		

=== Bondfields ===
Bondfields
Party	Candidate	Votes	%	±%
Conservative	Alexander Rennie	525	52.9	
Labour	Munazza Faiz	335	33.7	
Liberal Democrats	Michael Bolt	133	13.4	
Majority		190		
Turnout		993		
Conservative hold		Swing		

=== Cowplain ===
Cowplain
Party	Candidate	Votes	%	±%
Conservative	Anthony Briggs	1,438	68.2	
Labour	Jay Kelly	288	13.7	
Liberal Democrats	Lisa Jackson	210	10.0	
Green	Bruce Holman	172	8.2	
Majority		1,150		
Turnout		2108		
Conservative hold		Swing		

=== Emsworth ===
Emsworth
Party	Candidate	Votes	%	±%
Conservative	Richard Kennett	2,195	69.1	
Labour	Stephen Bilbe	689	21.7	
Liberal Democrats	Christopher Maple	294	9.3	
Majority		1,506		
Turnout		3,178		
Conservative hold		Swing		

=== Hart Plain ===
Hart Plain
Party	Candidate	Votes	%	±%
Conservative	Praid Bains	1,322	66.4	
Labour	Howard Sherlock	324	16.3	
Liberal Democrats	Hilary Bolt	194	9.7	
Green	John Colman	152	7.6	
Majority		998		
Turnout		1,992		
Conservative hold		Swing		

=== Hayling East ===
Hayling East
Party	Candidate	Votes	%	±%
Conservative	Rosemarie Raines	1,571	59.8	
Labour	Peter Oliver	483	18.4	
UKIP	John Perry	279	10.6	
Liberal Democrats	Suzette Gray	165	6.3	
Green	Natasha Parker	131	5.0	
Majority		1,088		
Turnout		2,629		
Conservative gain from UKIP		Swing		

=== Hayling West ===
Hayling West (2)
Party	Candidate	Votes	%	±%
Conservative	Isobel Scott	1,815	70.0	
Conservative	Michael Wilson	1,792	69.1	
Labour	John Mealy	390	15.0	
Liberal Democrats	Paul Gray	345	13.3	
Liberal Democrats	William Forrow	336	13.0	
Labour	Ian Heapy	306	11.8	
UKIP	Patricia Farnham	207	8.0	
Turnout		2,757		
Conservative hold		Swing		
Conservative hold		Swing		

=== Purbrook ===
Purbrook
Party	Candidate	Votes	%	±%
Conservative	Adam Christie	1,312	61.9	
Labour	Simon Hagan	410	19.3	
Liberal Democrats	Antonia Harrison	283	13.3	
Green	Rosemarie Blackburn	116	5.5	
Majority		902		
Turnout		2,121		
Conservative hold		Swing		

=== St Faith's ===
St. Faiths
Party	Candidate	Votes	%	±%
Conservative	Jacqueline Branson	1,498	57.1	
Labour	Simon Cattermole	486	18.5	
Liberal Democrats	Jane Briggs	362	13.8	
Green	Richard Lanchester	277	10.6	
Majority		1,012		
Turnout		2,623		
Conservative hold		Swing		

=== Stakes ===
Stakes
Party	Candidate	Votes	%	±%
Conservative	Sarah Milne	990	58.5	
Labour	Lorraine Brown	489	28.9	
Liberal Democrats	Ann Bazley	212	12.5	
Majority		501		
Turnout		1,691		
Conservative gain from UKIP		Swing		

=== Warren Park ===
Warren Park
Party	Candidate	Votes	%	±%
Labour	Beryl Francis	319	36.7	
Conservative	Curtis Stanfield	313	36.0	
Liberal Democrats	Margaret Brown	119	13.7	
UKIP	Graham Stouse	119	13.7	
Majority		6		
Turnout		870		
Labour hold		Swing		

=== Waterloo ===
Waterloo
Party	Candidate	Votes	%	±%
Conservative	Michael Sceal	1,650	69.5	
Liberal Democrats	John Pratley	723	30.5	
Majority		927		
Turnout		2,373		
Conservative hold		Swing		
