= 2018 Three Rivers District Council election =

2018 UK local government election

Map showing the results of the 2018 Three Rivers District Council election

The 2018 Three Rivers District Council election took place on 3 May 2018 to elect members of Three Rivers District Council in England. This was the same day as other local elections.

Shortly before the election the Liberal Democrats lost their majority on the council with the resignation of two councillors from the party in March and April 2018, putting the council under no overall control. The Liberal Democrats regained their majority on the council at the election.

== Results summary ==
Three Rivers District Council election, 2018
Party	Seats	Gains	Losses	Net gain/loss	Seats %	Votes %	Votes	+/−
Liberal Democrats	8	1	0	▲1	61.54	37.39	8,905	
Conservative	4	0	0	Steady	30.77	40.13	9,559	
Labour	1	0	0	Steady	7.69	15.94	3,798	
Green	0	0	0	Steady	0.00	3.96	943	
UKIP	0	0	0	Steady	0.00	2.09	499	
Independent	0	0	1	▼1	0.00	0.49	116	

== Ward results ==
An asterisk * indicates an incumbent seeking re-election.

=== Abbots Langley & Bedmond ===
Abbots Langley & Bedmond
Party	Candidate	Votes	%	±%
Liberal Democrats	Sara Bedford*	1,096	57.23	
Conservative	Andrew O'Brien	456	23.81	
Labour	Joanne Cox	237	12.38	
Green	Bobbie Curran	67	3.50	
UKIP	John Appleford	59	3.08	
Majority		640		
Turnout		1915	38.18	
Liberal Democrats hold		Swing		

=== Carpenders Park ===
Carpenders Park
Party	Candidate	Votes	%	±%
Conservative	Donna Duncan	1,144	61.84	
Labour	Mandy Shumake	397	21.46	
Liberal Democrats	Pam Hames	309	16.70	
Majority		747		
Turnout			34.60	
Conservative hold		Swing		

=== Chorleywood North and Sarratt ===
Chorleywood North and Sarratt
Party	Candidate	Votes	%	±%
Conservative	Alex Hayward*	1,441	74.13	
Liberal Democrats	Frank Mahon-Daly	320	16.46	
Labour	Margaret Gallagher	144	7.40	
UKIP	Hazel Day	39	2.00	
Majority				
Turnout			33.46	
Conservative hold		Swing		

=== Chorleywood South & Maple Cross ===
Chorleywood South & Maple Cross
Party	Candidate	Votes	%	±%
Liberal Democrats	Martin Trevett	1,149	50.22	
Conservative	Colin Payne	842	36.80	
Labour	Jack Hazelwood	157	6.86	
Green	Roger Stafford	140	6.12	
Majority		307		
Turnout			39.03	
Liberal Democrats hold		Swing		

=== Dickinsons ===
Dickinsons
Party	Candidate	Votes	%	±%
Liberal Democrats	Margaret Hofman	967	48.89	
Conservative	David Redman	678	34.28	
Labour Co-op	Jeri Swift Gillette	290	14.66	
UKIP	Tracey Smart	43	2.17	
Majority		289		
Turnout			37.91	
Liberal Democrats hold		Swing		

=== Durrants ===
Durrants
Party	Candidate	Votes	%	±%
Liberal Democrats	Steve Drury*	1,033	56.95	
Conservative	David Woodford	411	22.66	
Labour	John Grillo	225	12.4	
Green	Matthew Pashby	102	5.62	
UKIP	Tony Speechly	43	2.37	
Majority		622		
Turnout			35.96	
Liberal Democrats hold		Swing		

=== Gade Valley ===
Gade Valley
Party	Candidate	Votes	%	±%
Liberal Democrats	John Tankard	835	54.47	
Conservative	Dee Ward	372	24.27	
Labour	Bruce Prochnik	261	17.03	
Green	Emma Brading	65	4.24	
Majority		463		
Turnout			30.35	
Liberal Democrats hold		Swing		

=== Leavesden ===
Leavesden
Party	Candidate	Votes	%	±%
Liberal Democrats	Alex Turner	954	53.87	
Conservative	Hitesh Tailor	356	20.10	
Labour	Marie-Louise Nolan	283	15.98	
Independent	Martin Brooks*	116	6.55	
UKIP	David Bennett	62	3.50	
Majority		598		
Turnout			30.93	
Liberal Democrats gain from Independent		Swing		

Martin Brooks was elected as a Liberal Democrat in 2014 but stood as the incumbent in 2018 as an Independent.

=== Moor Park & Eastbury ===
Moor Park & Eastbury
Party	Candidate	Votes	%	±%
Conservative	Jo Clemens	1,123	77.13	
Liberal Democrats	Jeremy Asquith	192	13.19	
Labour	Sonia Adesara	141	9.68	
Majority		931		
Turnout			31.12	
Conservative hold		Swing		

=== Oxhey Hall & Hayling ===
Oxhey Hall & Hayling
Party	Candidate	Votes	%	±%
Liberal Democrats	Alison Scarth*	800	44.32	
Conservative	Andy Milner	463	25.65	
Labour	Chris Green	433	23.99	
UKIP	Mick Matthewson	67	3.71	
Green	Matt Jones	42	2.33	
Majority		337		
Turnout		1,805	34.20	
Liberal Democrats hold		Swing		

=== Penn & Mill End ===
Penn & Mill End
Party	Candidate	Votes	%	±%
Liberal Democrats	Sarah Jane Nelmes*	857	48.42	
Conservative	Nayesh Radia	618	34.92	
Labour	Martin Waldron	185	10.45	
Green	Peter Loader	110	6.21	
Majority		239		
Turnout		1770	33.82	
Liberal Democrats hold		Swing		

=== Rickmansworth Town ===
Rickmansworth Town
Party	Candidate	Votes	%	±%
Conservative	Paula Hiscocks*	1,386	57.80	
Green	Tom Pashby	395	16.47	
Liberal Democrats	Pat Howell	333	13.89	
Labour	Andrew Gallagher	233	9.72	
UKIP	Mark Massyn	51	2.13	
Majority		991		
Turnout		2398	42.59	
Conservative hold		Swing		

=== South Oxhey ===
South Oxhey
Party	Candidate	Votes	%	±%
Labour	Stephen King	812	62.55	
Conservative	Elizabeth Willetts	269	20.72	
UKIP	Yessica Gould	135	10.40	
Liberal Democrats	Robert Johnstone	60	4.62	
Green	Mary Chabrel	22	1.69	
Majority		543		
Turnout		1298	28.74	
Labour hold		Swing		
