= 2018 Halton Borough Council election =

2018 UK local government election

- 3 May 2018

18 of 56 seats (17 regular and one by-election) to Halton Borough Council 29 seats needed for a majority
- Turnout: 26.1% (▲0.9%)

	First party	Second party	Third party
Party	Labour	Liberal Democrats	Conservative
Last election	18 seats, 67.8%	1 seat, 8.1%	1 seat, 15.1%
Seats before	52	2	2
Seats won	17	1	0
Seats after	52	2	2
Seat change	Steady	Steady	Steady
Popular vote	14,544	1,706	3,704
Percentage	66.7%	7.8%	17.0%
Swing	▲0.7%	▲1.3%	▲2.0%
- Map showing the results of the 2018 Halton Borough Council election
Leader of the Council before election
Rob Polhill
Labour
Leader of the Council after election
Rob Polhill
Labour

The 2018 Halton Borough Council election took place on 3 May 2018 to elect members of Halton Borough Council in England. This election was held on the same day as other local elections.

After the election, the composition of the council was:

Party	Seats	±
Labour	52	Steady
Liberal Democrat	2	Steady
Conservative	2	Steady
Source: BBC

== Election results ==
=== Overall election result ===
Overall result compared with 2014. (Note: Cannot be compared with 2016 as not all seats are up for election every third.)

Halton Borough Council election result, 2018 (Note: % of total refers to % of wards won.)
Party	Candidates						Votes		
Party	Stood	Elected	Gained	Unseated	Net	% of total	%	No.	Net %
Labour	18	17	0	0	Steady	94.1	66.7	14,544	▲0.7
Conservative	10	0	0	0	Steady	0.0	17.0	3,704	▲2.0
Liberal Democrats	7	1	0	0	Steady	5.9	7.8	1,706	▲1.3
Independent	3	0	0	0	Steady	0.0	4.4	963	N/A
UKIP	7	0	0	0	Steady	0.0	3.2	701	▼8.5
TUSC	1	0	0	0	Steady	0.0	0.5	106	▼0.3
Socialist Labour	1	0	0	0	Steady	0.0	0.4	97	N/A
