= 2018 Rugby Borough Council election =

2018 UK local government election

The 2018 Rugby Borough Council election was held on Thursday 3 May 2018 to elect 14 members to the Rugby Borough Council, the same day as other local elections in the United Kingdom. It elected one-third of the council's 42 members for a four-year term. The Conservatives held control of the council after the election.

== Results summary ==
2018 Rugby Borough Council election
Party	This election			Full council			This election		
Party	Seats	Net	Seats %	Other	Total	Total %	Votes	Votes %	+/−
Conservative	8	▲1	57.1	15	23	54.8	12,096	46.9	▲10.8
Labour	3	Steady	21.4	6	9	21.4	8,397	32.6	▲7.2
Liberal Democrats	3	Steady	21.4	6	9	21.4	3,947	15.3	▼2.2
Independent	0	▼1	0.0	1	1	2.4	0	0.0	▼7.8
Green	0	Steady	0.0	0	0	0.0	1,178	4.6	▲0.4
TUSC	0	Steady	0.0	0	0	0.0	155	0.6	▼1.0

== Ward results ==
=== Admirals and Cawston ===
Admirals and Cawston
Party	Candidate	Votes	%	±%
Conservative	Dale Keeling	900	45.4	▲4.3
Labour	Will Pimlett	706	35.6	▲7.4
Liberal Democrats	Lee Chase	280	14.1	▲10.8
Green	Jenny Farley	96	4.8	▲0.5
Majority		194	9.8	▼3.1
Total valid votes		1,982	32.1	
Conservative hold		Swing	▼1.6	

=== Benn ===
Benn
Party	Candidate	Votes	%	±%
Labour	Jim Shera	966	57.7	▲6.8
Conservative	John Keeling	366	21.9	▲1.1
Liberal Democrats	Hugh Trimble	150	9.0	▲1.2
Green	Roy Sandison	117	7.0	▼6.9
TUSC	Marian Wakelin	76	4.5	▼2.2
Majority		600	35.8	▲5.7
Total valid votes		1,675	27.2	
Labour hold		Swing	▲2.9	

=== Bilton ===
Bilton
Party	Candidate	Votes	%	±%
Conservative	Chris Cade*	1,277	58.3	▲4.1
Labour	Phil Hemsley	631	28.8	▲7.4
Liberal Democrats	Lesley Kennedy George	190	8.7	▼0.8
Green	Ian Wright	94	4.3	▼5.8
Majority		646	29.5	▼3.3
Total valid votes		2,192	42.0	
Conservative hold		Swing	▼1.7	

=== Coton and Boughton ===
Coton and Boughton
Party	Candidate	Votes	%	±%
Conservative	Jill Simpson-Vince*	900	58.4	▲15.0
Labour	Mark Brassey	640	41.6	▲14.3
Majority		260	16.9	▲0.8
Total valid votes		1,540	29.2	
Conservative hold		Swing	▲0.4	

=== Dunsmore ===
Dunsmore
Party	Candidate	Votes	%	±%
Conservative	Deepah Roberts* (Note: While Deepah Roberts ran as an independent in 2014, the change in vote share is based on the support for Ian Spiers, the Conservative candidate, in that election)	1,775	76.4	▲37.7
Labour	Beck Hemsley	547	23.6	▲14.9
Majority		1,228	52.9	N/A
Total valid votes		2,322	39.2	
Conservative gain from Independent		Swing	▲11.4	

=== Eastlands ===
Eastlands
Party	Candidate	Votes	%	±%
Liberal Democrats	Craig McQueen	843	43.1	▲9.2
Conservative	Zoe Feeney	511	26.2	▲0.7
Labour	Matthew Weston	505	25.8	▲1.2
Green	Patrick Steel	95	4.9	▼6.2
Majority		332	17.0	▲8.6
Total valid votes		1,954	32.9	
Liberal Democrats hold		Swing	▲4.6	

=== Hillmorton ===
Hillmorton
Party	Candidate	Votes	%	±%
Conservative	Ian Picker	888	50.1	▲7.3
Labour	Jim Ellis	711	40.1	▲9.7
Liberal Democrats	Laura Slinn	112	6.3	▼8.7
Green	Peter Reynolds	60	3.4	▼8.3
Majority		177	10.0	▼2.4
Total valid votes		1,771	41.0	
Conservative hold		Swing	▼1.2	

=== New Bilton ===
New Bilton
Party	Candidate	Votes	%	±%
Labour	Mike Brader	747	50.6	▲1.7
Conservative	Adam Daly	494	33.5	▲3.9
Green	Bob Beggs	198	13.4	▼8.2
Liberal Democrats	Hossain Tafazzal	37	2.5	New
Majority		253	17.1	▼2.2
Total valid votes		1,476	25.5	
Labour hold		Swing	▼1.1	

=== Newbold and Brownsover ===
Newbold and Brownsover
Party	Candidate	Votes	%	±%
Labour	Ram Srivastava*	716	47.5	▲4.8
Conservative	Eve Hassell	624	41.4	▲9.9
Green	Mark Summers	167	11.1	▼8.1
Majority		92	6.1	▼5.1
Total valid votes		1,507	24.4	
Labour hold		Swing	▼2.6	

=== Paddox ===
Paddox
Party	Candidate	Votes	%	±%
Liberal Democrats	Noreen New*	1,070	47.0	▼3.2
Conservative	Tony Meeson	668	29.3	▲5.6
Labour	Jonathan Vickers	469	20.6	▲2.8
Green	Maralyn Pickup	70	3.1	▼5.2
Majority		402	17.7	▼8.8
Total valid votes		2,277	40.6	
Liberal Democrats hold		Swing	▼4.4	

=== Revel and Binley Woods ===
Revel and Binley Woods
Party	Candidate	Votes	%	±%
Conservative	Belinda Garcia*	1,406	73.5	▲25.8
Labour	Anna Coupe	507	26.5	▲7.7
Majority		899	47.0	▲25.3
Total valid votes		1,913	36.3	
Conservative hold		Swing	▲9.1	

=== Rokeby and Overslade ===
Rokeby and Overslade
Party	Candidate	Votes	%	±%
Liberal Democrats	Bill Lewis*	1,265	52.5	▲8.2
Conservative	Paul Wesson	552	22.9	▼3.9
Labour	Ian Black	512	21.3	▲0.5
Green	Kate Crowley	80	3.3	▼2.0
Majority		713	29.6	▲12.1
Total valid votes		2,409	39.8	
Liberal Democrats hold		Swing	▲6.1	

=== Wolston and the Lawfords ===
Wolston and the Lawfords
Party	Candidate	Votes	%	±%
Conservative	Andrew Bearne	1,174	58.5	▲15.6
Labour	Lauren Kennedy	553	27.6	▲11.0
Green	Lesley Summers	201	10.0	▲1.4
TUSC	Pete McLaren	79	3.9	▲0.8
Majority		621	30.9	▲16.8
Total valid votes		2,007	33.6	
Conservative hold		Swing	▲2.3	

=== Wolvey and Shilton ===
Wolvey and Shilton
Party	Candidate	Votes	%	±%
Conservative	Chris Pacey-Day*	561	75.0	▲7.5
Labour	Ben Law	187	25.0	▲3.8
Majority		374	50.0	▲3.7
Total valid votes		748	37.4	
Conservative hold		Swing	▲1.9	
