= 2018 South Tyneside Metropolitan Borough Council election =

2018 UK local government election

Map showing the results of the 2018 South Tyneside Metropolitan Borough Council election

The 2018 South Tyneside Council election took place on 3 May 2018 to elect members of South Tyneside Council in England, the same day as other local elections.

== Ward results ==
=== Beacon & Bents ward ===
Beacon & Bents
Party	Candidate	Votes	%	±%
Labour	Angela Hamilton	1,235	50.3	−0.4
Green	David Francis	960	39.1	N/A
Conservative	Ali Hayder	261	10.6	−4.3

=== Bede ward ===
Bede
Party	Candidate	Votes	%	±%
Labour	Stephen Dean	951	53.1	+11.6
Independent	Keith Roberts	599	33.5	N/A
Conservative	Gerard Leake	158	8.8	+3.8
Green	Tony Gair	82	4.6	N/A

=== Biddick & All Saints ward ===
Biddick & All Saints
Party	Candidate	Votes	%	±%
Labour	Olive Punchion	1,100	69.2	+8.8
Conservative	Oliver Wallhead	249	15.7	+9.5
Green	David Herbert	241	15.2	N/A

=== Boldon Colliery ward ===
Boldon Colliery
Party	Candidate	Votes	%	±%
Labour	Alison Strike	1,499	64.3	+5.8
Conservative	Ian Armstrong	575	24.6	+10.4
Green	Colin Tosh	259	11.1	N/A

=== Cleadon & East Boldon ward ===
Cleadon & East Boldon
Party	Candidate	Votes	%	±%
Conservative	Jeff Milburn	1,601	48.6	+11.6
Labour	Margaret Meling	1330	40.4	+0.3
Green	Sarah McKeown	365	11.1	N/A

=== Cleadon Park ward ===
Cleadon Park
Party	Candidate	Votes	%	±%
Labour	Jim Foreman	959	52.8	+15.0
Conservative	Sam Prior	646	35.6	+28.1
Green	Angela Curtis	212	11.7	N/A

=== Fellgate & Hedworth ward ===
Fellgate & Hedworth
Party	Candidate	Votes	%	±%
Labour	Geraldine Kilgour	1,365	58.1	+7.0
Independent	John Robertson	460	19.6	N/A
Conservative	David Morris	140	6.0	+0.2
Liberal Democrats	David Wilkinson	325	13.8	N/A
Green	Malcolm Giles	61	2.6	N/A

=== Harton ward ===
Harton
Party	Candidate	Votes	%	±%
Labour	Neil Maxwell	1,137	52.1	+2.2
Conservative	Holly Wright	775	35.5	+19.5
Green	Rhiannon Curtis	269	12.3	N/A

=== Hebburn North ward ===
Hebburn North
Party	Candidate	Votes	%	±%
Labour	Richie Porthouse	1,430	72.9	+27.1
Conservative	Keith Sumby	273	13.9	+9.5
Green	Steve Richards	259	13.2	N/A

=== Hebburn South ward ===
Hebburn South
Party	Candidate	Votes	%	±%
Labour	Nancy Maxwell	1,527	69.0	+3.3
Conservative	Fiona Milburn	371	16.8	+8.1
Green	Matthew Giles	316	14.3	N/A

=== Horsley Hill ward ===
Horsley Hill
Party	Candidate	Votes	%	±%
Labour	Eileen Leask	1,393	55.7	+7.3
Conservative	Marilyn Huartt	608	24.3	+11.1
Independent	Philip Bates	255	10.2	N/A
Green	Jack Ford	247	9.9	N/A

=== Monkton ward ===
Monkton
Party	Candidate	Votes	%	±%
Labour	Jim Sewell	1,369	68.2	+6.8
Conservative	Vanessa Green	358	17.8	+8.5
Green	Matthew McKenna	279	13.9	N/A

=== Primrose ward ===
Primrose
Party	Candidate	Votes	%	±%
Labour	Moira Smith	1,122	66.9	+9.1
Conservative	Jonathan Lunness	325	19.4	+12.1
Green	Lesley Hanson	229	13.7	N/A

=== Simonside & Rekendyke ward ===
Simonside & Rekendyke
Party	Candidate	Votes	%	±%
Labour	Lynne Proudlock	1,276	68.1	+12.0
Conservative	David Gamblin	341	18.2	+12.7
Green	Peter Bristow	256	13.7	N/A

=== West Park ward ===
West Park
Party	Candidate	Votes	%	±%
Labour	Norman Dick	795	45.0	0.0
Conservative	John Stanton	424	24.0	+8.4
Liberal Democrats	Anthony Sayer	207	11.7	N/A
Independent	Robert Atkinson	171	9.7	N/A
Green	Thomas Mower	168	9.5	N/A

=== Westoe ward ===
Westoe
Party	Candidate	Votes	%	±%
Labour	Allan West	888	42.2	−2.6
Conservative	Jack White	617	29.3	+12.1
Liberal Democrats	Michael Hailey	355	16.9	N/A
Green	Nicola Usher	246	11.7	N/A

=== Whitburn & Marsden ward ===
Whitburn & Marsden
Party	Candidate	Votes	%	±%
Labour	Peter Boyack	1,059	50.7	+0.3
Conservative	Adam Stewart	648	31.0	+15.1
Green	Colette Hume	381	18.2	N/A

=== Whiteleas ward ===
Whiteleas
Party	Candidate	Votes	%	±%
Labour	Bill Brady	1,307	68.1	+10.0
Conservative	Colin Lemon	327	17.0	+10.8
Green	Ryan Bell	284	14.8	N/A
