= 2018 West Oxfordshire District Council election =

2018 UK local government election

Results of the 2018 West Oxfordshire District Council election

The 2018 West Oxfordshire District Council election was held on 3 May 2018 to elect members of West Oxfordshire District Council in England. This was on the same day as other local elections.

Elections were held for 17 of the 49 seats on the council. Five seats changed hands. The Conservative Party lost five seats, the Liberal Democrats gained three and the Labour Party gained two. The Conservatives remained in overall control of the council with a reduced total of 34 seats. The Liberal Democrats remained the largest opposition group with eight seats. The Labour Party remained the third largest party with six seats.

== Ward results ==
=== Ascott and Shipton ===
Ascott and Shipton 2018
Party	Candidate	Votes	%	±%
Liberal Democrats	Jake Ryan Acock	457	52.8	+43.0
Conservative	Tom Simcox	337	38.9	−23.7
Labour	Sian Priscilla Florence O'Neill	57	6.6	−8.3
Green	Celia Jocelyn Kerslake	15	1.7	−10.9
Turnout		866	51.15%	
Majority		120		
Liberal Democrats gain from Conservative				

=== Bampton and Clanfield ===
Bampton and Clanfield 2018
Party	Candidate	Votes	%	±%
Conservative	James Francis Mills	646	58.5	−0.9
Liberal Democrats	Dennis Thrale Walker	214	19.4	+11.0
Labour	Trevor Ian License	110	10.0	+0.3
Independent	Pete Handley	96	8.7	N/A
Green	Harriet Lorna Mary Kopinska	38	3.4	−6.2
Turnout		1,104	36.53%	
Majority		432		
Conservative hold		Swing		

=== Brize Norton and Shilton ===
Brize Norton and Shilton 2018
Party	Candidate	Votes	%	±%
Conservative	Alex Postan	417	71.9	+16.9
Liberal Democrats	Gillian Elizabeth Workman	94	16.2	N/A
Labour	Stephen Parkinson	69	11.9	N/A
Turnout		580	37.46%	
Majority		323		
Conservative hold		Swing		

=== Burford ===
Burford 2018
Party	Candidate	Votes	%	±%
Conservative	Derek Albert Cotterill	503	75.0	+1.7
Liberal Democrats	Elizabeth Anne Mortimer	113	16.8	N/A
Labour	Andrew Lawrence Ferrero	55	8.2	+2.3
Turnout		671	44.55%	
Majority		390		
Conservative hold		Swing		

=== Carterton North East ===
Carterton North East 2018
Party	Candidate	Votes	%	±%
Conservative	Martin Dominic McBride	500	65.4	+5.7
Labour	Calvert Charles Stuart McGibbon	167	21.8	+7.7
Liberal Democrats	Derek George Laud	98	12.8	+6.8
Turnout		765	19.67%	
Majority		333		
Conservative hold		Swing		

=== Carterton North West ===
Carterton North West 2018
Party	Candidate	Votes	%	±%
Conservative	Maxine Judith Crosland	626	68.9	+8.9
Labour	David John Wesson	189	20.8	+8.6
Liberal Democrats	Ivan Aguado Melet	94	10.3	+5.0
Turnout		909	24.13%	
Majority		437		
Conservative hold		Swing		

=== Carterton South ===
Carterton South 2018
Party	Candidate	Votes	%	±%
Conservative	Nick Leverton	572	69.7	+8.2
Liberal Democrats	Benjamin Lawrence Lines	111	13.5	+7.5
Labour	Simon David Adderley	109	13.3	+1.8
Green	Andy King	29	3.5	−2.1
Turnout		821	23.39%	
Majority		461		
Conservative hold		Swing		

=== Chipping Norton ===
Chipping Norton 2018
Party	Candidate	Votes	%	±%
Labour	Laetisia Catherine Carter	1,116	59.0	+10.8
Conservative	Gary Elwyn Jones	490	25.9	−15.1
Liberal Democrats	Juliet Elizabeth Anson Byrne	284	15.0	+12.2
Turnout		1,890	37.72%	
Majority		626		
Labour hold		Swing		

=== Ducklington ===
Ducklington 2018
Party	Candidate	Votes	%	±%
Conservative	Ben Woodruff	375	62.0	+11.4
Liberal Democrats	John Charles Cole	119	19.7	N/A
Labour	Richard John Kelsall	111	18.3	+0.4
Turnout		605	35.35%	
Majority		256		
Conservative hold		Swing		

=== Eynsham and Cassington ===
Eynsham and Cassington 2018
Party	Candidate	Votes	%	±%
Liberal Democrats	Carl Martin Rylett	1,062	49.4	+29.4
Conservative	Abdul Mubin	604	28.1	−10.4
Labour	Elsa Louise Dawson	383	17.8	−9.8
Green	Helen Gavin	102	4.7	−9.2
Turnout		2,151	44.61%	
Majority		458		
Liberal Democrats gain from Conservative				

=== Freeland and Hanborough ===
Freeland and Hanborough 2018
Party	Candidate	Votes	%	±%
Labour	Merilyn Elizabeth Davies	741	45.6	+33.4
Conservative	Alaa Hassan Al-Yousuf	602	37.1	−10.2
Conservative	Colin Graham Dingwall	570	35.1	−12.2
Labour	Andrew Philip Lesnik	442	27.2	+15.0
Independent	Stuart Brooks	370	22.8	N/A
Green	Andrew Wright	123	7.6	−4.6
Liberal Democrats	Andy Crick	122	7.5	−9.8
Liberal Democrats	Chris Tatton	95	5.8	−11.5
Turnout		1,624	47.68%	
Majority		139		
Labour gain from Conservative				

=== The Bartons ===
The Bartons 2018
Party	Candidate	Votes	%	±%
Liberal Democrats	Dave Jackson	423	53.0	+37.4
Conservative	Jonny Rosemont	342	42.9	−19.0
Labour	Aaron James Michael Miles	33	4.1	N/A
Turnout		798	52.11%	
Majority		81		
Liberal Democrats gain from Conservative				

=== Witney East ===
Witney East 2018
Party	Candidate	Votes	%	±%
Labour	Rosalind Moya Bolger	869	44.1	−3.9
Conservative	Ron Spurs	859	43.6	−0.6
Liberal Democrats	Gabriel William Jonathan Schenk	130	6.6	+4.0
Green	Stuart Sutherland McDonald	111	5.6	+0.5
Turnout		1,969	33.96%	
Majority		10		
Labour gain from Conservative				

=== Witney South ===
Witney South 2018
Party	Candidate	Votes	%	±%
Conservative	Anthony David Harvey	666	42.9	−6.2
Labour	Owen Gregory Blase Collins	640	41.2	+7.9
Green	Carol Rae Cather	134	8.6	−0.5
Liberal Democrats	Christopher John Blount	113	7.3	−1.2
Turnout		1,553	32.50%	
Majority		26		
Conservative hold		Swing		

=== Woodstock and Bladon ===
Woodstock and Bladon 2018
Party	Candidate	Votes	%	±%
Liberal Democrats	Julian Craig Cooper	604	42.0	−0.8
Conservative	Betsy Glasgow	403	28.0	−13.6
Independent	Sharone Parnes	154	10.7	N/A
Green	Mathew Oliver William Parkinson	152	10.6	+4.2
Labour	Dave Baldwin	125	8.7	−0.5
Turnout		1,438	43.77%	
Majority		201		
Liberal Democrats hold		Swing		
