= 2018 Cherwell District Council election =

2018 UK local government election

Results of the 2018 Cherwell District Council election

The 2018 Cherwell District Council election was held on 3 May 2018 to elect members of Cherwell District Council in England. This was on the same day as other local elections.

Elections were held for 16 of the seats on the council. The Conservative Party won one seat from an independent councillor. Labour Party and the Liberal Democrats each won one seat from the Conservatives. The Conservative Party remained in overall control of the council, with its majority reduced to 29. The Labour Party remained the largest opposition group, with their seats increased to nine. The Liberal Democrats became the third party with one seat.

== Ward results ==
=== Adderbury, Bloxham and Bodicote ===
Adderbury, Bloxham and Bodicote 2018
Party	Candidate	Votes	%	±%
Conservative	Andrew John McHugh	1,457	58.6	+9.7
Labour	Suezette Elizabeth Watson	540	21.7	+5.3
Liberal Democrats	Peter Davis	284	11.4	−2.1
Green	Andy Aris	207	8.3	−12.9
Turnout			35.82%	
Majority		917		
Conservative hold		Swing		

=== Banbury Calthorpe and Easington ===
Banbury Calthorpe and Easington 2018
Party	Candidate	Votes	%	±%
Conservative	Tony Mepham	1,447	57.1	+9.5
Labour	Antonio Oliver Joseph Ferrara	758	29.9	+2.4
Green	Jane Beatrix Hamel	169	6.7	−8.2
Liberal Democrats	Brent Jackson	158	6.2	−3.8
Turnout			33.80%	
Majority		689		
Conservative hold		Swing		

=== Banbury Cross and Neithrop ===
Banbury Cross and Neithrop 2018
Party	Candidate	Votes	%	±%
Labour	Cassi Perry	1,225	50.7	+3.0
Conservative	Alastair John Milne-Home	883	36.6	+2.9
Green	Bernard Geoffrey Dod	155	6.4	−12.2
Liberal Democrats	Bette Melling	152	6.3	N/A
Turnout			35.50%	
Majority		372		
Labour gain from Conservative				

=== Banbury Grimsbury and Hightown ===
Banbury Grimsbury and Hightown 2018
Party	Candidate	Votes	%	±%
Labour	Shaida Hussain	1,098	49.2	+11.3
Conservative	David Frederick Beverly	849	38.1	+9.0
Green	Liz Vere	169	7.6	−3.6
Liberal Democrats	David Brian Wiles	114	5.1	−3.3
Turnout			32.57%	
Majority		249		
Labour hold		Swing		

=== Banbury Hardwick ===
Banbury Hardwick 2018
Party	Candidate	Votes	%	±%
Conservative	Tony Ilott	918	48.9	+15.5
Labour	Perran Henry Rupert Moon	778	41.4	+15.6
Green	Simmi Cumberbatch	182	9.7	−2.2
Turnout			30.88%	
Majority		140		
Conservative hold		Swing		

=== Banbury Ruscote ===
Banbury Ruscote 2018
Party	Candidate	Votes	%	±%
Labour	Barry Keir Richards	1,033	60.1	+11.2
Conservative	Chris Phillips	580	33.7	+11.6
Green	Rita Rosa Victoria White	107	6.2	−3.6
Turnout			27.87%	
Majority		453		
Labour hold		Swing		

=== Bicester East ===
Bicester East 2018
Party	Candidate	Votes	%	±%
Conservative	Tom Wallis	1,018	53.4	+7.5
Labour	Celia Helen Kavuma	653	34.3	−2.5
Green	Robert Joseph Nixon	235	12.3	−5.1
Turnout			31.88%	
Majority		365		
Conservative hold		Swing		

=== Bicester North and Caversfield ===
Bicester North and Caversfield 2018
Party	Candidate	Votes	%	±%
Conservative	Nick Mawer	908	53.6	+13.0
Labour	Margaret Elisabeth Lyon	457	27.0	+0.9
Liberal Democrats	Daniel Morgan Murphy	192	11.3	N/A
Green	Patrick Francis Boon	137	8.1	−6.8
Turnout			28.00%	
Majority		451		
Conservative hold		Swing		

=== Bicester South and Ambrosden ===
Bicester South and Ambrosden 2018
Party	Candidate	Votes	%	±%
Conservative	Lucinda Elizabeth-Anne Louise Wing	824	38.0	+7.4
Independent	Nick Cotter	796	36.7	+8.5
Labour	Marcus English	421	19.4	−6.7
Green	Roger David Nixon	126	5.8	−9.1
Turnout			30.10%	
Majority		28		
Conservative gain from Independent				

=== Cropredy, Sibfords and Wroxton ===
Cropredy, Sibfords and Wroxton 2018
Party	Candidate	Votes	%	±%
Conservative	Phil Chapman	1,677	60.0	+7.0
Conservative	George Douglas Webb	1618	57.9	+4.9
Labour	Anne Felicia Cullen	512	18.3	−0.7
Labour	Sue Moon	503	18.0	−1.0
Liberal Democrats	Julian Woodward	488	17.5	N/A
Green	Shaun Edward Greenslade-Hibbert	433	15.5	−0.1
Turnout		2796	43.25%	
Majority		1106		
Conservative hold		Swing		

=== Deddington ===
Deddington 2018
Party	Candidate	Votes	%	±%
Conservative	Mike Kerford-Byrnes	1,637	56.4	+6.7
Labour	Annette Murphy	597	20.6	+1.8
Liberal Democrats	Nigel Geoffrey Davis	350	12.1	N/A
Green	Aaron James Bliss	317	10.9	−8.8
Turnout			39.78%	
Majority		1040		
Conservative hold		Swing		

=== Fringford and the Heyfords ===
Fringford and the Heyfords 2018
Party	Candidate	Votes	%	±%
Conservative	Barry Victor Wood	1,470	66.5	+14.9
Green	Jenny Tamblyn	379	17.1	+0.1
Labour	Robby Finley Prior	361	16.3	−0.2
Turnout			35.39%	
Majority		1091		
Conservative hold		Swing		

=== Kidlington East ===
Kidlington East 2018
Party	Candidate	Votes	%	±%
Conservative	Carmen Griffiths	1,153	44.5	−10.3
Green	Ian Michael Middleton	776	29.9	+22.3
Labour	Andrew Hornsby-Smith	664	25.6	+3.7
Turnout			36.29%	
Majority		377		
Conservative hold		Swing		

=== Kidlington West ===
Kidlington West 2018
Party	Candidate	Votes	%	±%
Liberal Democrats	Alaric David Hammond Rose	1,793	57.2	+30.0
Conservative	Nigel Jason Simpson	1045	33.3	−0.8
Labour	John Stansby	299	9.5	−6.9
Turnout			45.85%	
Majority		748		
Liberal Democrats gain from Conservative				

=== Launton and Otmoor ===
Launton and Otmoor 2018
Party	Candidate	Votes	%	±%
Conservative	David Leonard Hughes	1,386	58.6	+23.1
Labour	Michael Nixon	567	24.0	+2.5
Liberal Democrats	Timothy Michael Emptage	413	17.5	+4.3
Turnout			39.03%	
Majority		819		
Conservative hold		Swing		
