= 2018 Reigate and Banstead Borough Council election =

2018 UK local government election

Results of the 2018 Reigate and Banstead Borough Council election

The 2018 Reigate and Banstead Borough Council election took place on 3 May 2018 to elect members of Reigate and Banstead Borough Council in England. This was on the same day as other local elections. The Conservatives remained the largest party on the council while increasing their majority by 1, gaining a seat from both UKIP and the Liberal Democrats, while losing one seat to the Green Party.

== Election result ==
Reigate and Banstead local election result 2018
Party	Seats	Gains	Losses	Net gain/loss	Seats %	Votes %	Votes	+/−
Conservative	14	2	1	▲1	77.8	49.6	16,745	▲9.2
Green	2	1	0	▲1	11.1	10.1	3,408	▲1.5
Tattenhams RA	1	0	0	Steady	5.6	3.6	1,202	0.0
Nork RA	1	0	0	Steady	5.6	3.3	1,124	▼0.6
Labour	0	0	0	Steady	0.0	17.3	5,853	▲8.0
Liberal Democrats	0	0	1	▼1	0.0	12.5	4,210	▲3.9
UKIP	0	0	1	▼1	0.0	3.7	1,233	▼20.3

== Ward results ==
=== Banstead Village ===
Banstead Village
Party	Candidate	Votes	%	±%
Conservative	Samuel Walsh	1,413	68.4	▲11.5
Labour	Barbara Williams	307	14.9	New
Liberal Democrats	Graham Burr	259	12.5	▼1.4
UKIP	Colin Stiff	88	4.3	▼24.9
Majority		1,106	53.5	▲25.8
Turnout		2,073	33.7	▼2.9
Conservative hold		Swing		

=== Chipstead, Hooley and Woodmansterne ===
Chipstead, Hooley and Woodmansterne
Party	Candidate	Votes	%	±%
Conservative	Tim Archer	1,367	63.8	▲0.8
Labour	Peter Parrott	276	12.9	New
Liberal Democrats	Chris Howell	196	9.1	New
Green	Shasha Khan	183	8.5	New
UKIP	Laurence Clack	122	5.7	▼31.3
Majority		1,091	50.9	▲24.9
Turnout		2,149	32.4	▼3.5
Conservative hold		Swing		

=== Earlswood and Whitebushes ===
Earlswood and Whitebushes
Party	Candidate	Votes	%	±%
Green	Hal Brown	760	32.8	▲11.2
Conservative	Rita Renton	743	32.1	▲2.4
Labour	Toby Brampton	505	21.8	▲4.7
Liberal Democrats	Jane Kulka	163	7.0	▼0.6
UKIP	Joe Fox	146	6.3	▼17.7
Majority		17	0.7	N/A
Turnout		2,325	35.1	▼3.1
Green gain from Conservative		Swing		

=== Horley Central ===
Horley Central
Party	Candidate	Votes	%	±%
Conservative	Christian Stevens	1,164	61.4	▲28.0
Labour	Linda Mabbett	732	38.6	▲24.1
Majority		432	22.8	N/A
Turnout		1,932	29.7	▼2.8
Conservative gain from UKIP		Swing		

=== Horley East ===
Horley East
Party	Candidate	Votes	%	±%
Conservative	Graham Knight	1,184	66.1	▲17.2
Labour	Nicholas Gulsen-Sales	369	20.6	▲11.9
Liberal Democrats	Monica Dyer	239	13.3	▲6.1
Majority		815	45.5	▲24.2
Turnout		1,792	32.0	▼5.0
Conservative hold		Swing		

=== Horley West ===
Horley West
Party	Candidate	Votes	%	±%
Conservative	Alex Horwood	957	48.0	▲11.0
Conservative	Richard Biggs	868	43.5	N/A
Labour	Rob Spencer	440	22.1	▲9.5
Labour	Tom Turner	401	20.1	N/A
UKIP	Peter Palmer	303	15.2	▼21.2
Liberal Democrats	Geoffrey Southall	292	14.7	▲7.3
Majority		517	25.9	▲25.3
Turnout			29.7	▼4.8
Conservative hold		Swing		
Conservative hold		Swing		

=== Kingswood with Burgh Heath ===
Kingswood with Burgh Heath
Party	Candidate	Votes	%	±%
Conservative	Rod Ashford	1,454	80.9	▲23.8
Labour	Gerry O'Dwyer	223	12.4	New
UKIP	Alastair Richardson	120	6.7	▼25.3
Majority		1,231	68.5	▲43.4
Turnout		1,807	32.3	▼4.9
Conservative hold		Swing		

=== Meadvale and St John's ===
Meadvale and St John's
Party	Candidate	Votes	%	±%
Conservative	Jonathan White	841	39.5	▲3.2
Liberal Democrats	Stephen Kulka	835	39.3	▲1.0
Labour	Douglas Wickenden	246	11.6	▲1.7
Green	Sue Fenton	205	9.6	New
Majority		6	0.2	N/A
Turnout		2,135	36.9	▼4.7
Conservative gain from Liberal Democrats		Swing		

=== Merstham ===
Merstham
Party	Candidate	Votes	%	±%
Conservative	Graeme Crome	797	44.5	▲4.5
Labour	Stewart Dack	578	32.3	▲12.1
Liberal Democrats	Toby Risk	272	15.2	▲1.4
UKIP	Leigh Jones	144	8.0	▼18.1
Majority		219	12.2	▼1.7
Turnout		1,795	31.1	▼5.3
Conservative hold		Swing		

=== Nork ===
Nork
Party	Candidate	Votes	%	±%
Residents	Brian Stead	1,124	55.9	▼9.2
Conservative	Jane Illingworth	568	28.3	▲9.5
Labour	Alex Hubbard	133	6.6	New
Liberal Democrats	Stephen Gee	105	5.2	New
Green	Joseph Ingell	79	3.9	New
Majority		556	27.6	▼18.7
Turnout		2,015	32.1	▼4.9
Residents hold		Swing		

=== Redhill East ===
Redhill East
Party	Candidate	Votes	%	±%
Green	Jonathan Essex	1,377	58.2	▲13.2
Conservative	Paul Bevan	573	24.2	▼1.6
Labour	Rex Giles	296	12.5	▲0.7
Liberal Democrats	Stuart Holmes	121	5.1	▲0.7
Majority		804	34.0	▲14.8
Turnout		2,374	32.3	▼4.7
Green hold		Swing		

=== Redhill West ===
Redhill West
Party	Candidate	Votes	%	±%
Conservative	Rich Michalowski	984	44.0	▲5.9
Labour	Jon Pepper	593	26.5	▲7.5
Green	Ruth Ritter	322	14.4	▼0.2
Liberal Democrats	Andrew Cressy	256	11.5	▲3.2
UKIP	Steven Richards	80	3.6	▼16.3
Majority		391	17.5	▼0.7
Turnout		2,237	36.6	▼2.6
Conservative hold		Swing		

=== Reigate Central ===
Reigate Central
Party	Candidate	Votes	%	±%
Conservative	Michael Blacker	1,005	48.1	▲16.7
Liberal Democrats	John Vincent	546	26.1	▲12.4
Green	Elizabeth Wakefield	286	13.7	▲4.3
Labour	Michele David	253	12.1	▲3.2
Majority		459	22.0	▲16.4
Turnout		2,095	38.9	▼2.2
Conservative hold		Swing		

=== Reigate Hill ===
Reigate Hill
Party	Candidate	Votes	%	±%
Conservative	Gareth Owen	1,002	66.0	▼0.2
Liberal Democrats	Gregory Ardan	375	24.7	New
Labour	Denise Allen	141	9.3	▼8.4
Majority		627	41.3	▼7.2
Turnout		1,524	35.2	▲2.6
Conservative hold		Swing		

=== South Park and Woodhatch ===
South Park and Woodhatch
Party	Candidate	Votes	%	±%
Conservative	Victor Lewanski	826	45.8	▲7.6
Labour	Tony Robinson	476	26.4	▲7.0
Liberal Democrats	Moray Carey	354	19.6	▲8.4
UKIP	Chris Byrne	148	8.2	▼23.0
Majority		350	19.4	▲12.4
Turnout		1,807	33.7	▼2.5
Conservative hold		Swing		

=== Tadworth and Walton ===
Tadworth and Walton
Party	Candidate	Votes	%	±%
Conservative	Rachel Turner	1,410	71.8	▲13.2
Liberal Democrats	Sonja Begley-Moore	197	10.0	▲1.8
Green	Roger Ponsford	146	7.4	▼1.6
Labour	David Burnley	130	6.6	New
UKIP	Valerie Moore	82	4.2	▼20.1
Majority		1,213	61.8	▲27.5
Turnout		1,967	35.7	▼3.7
Conservative hold		Swing		

=== Tattenhams ===
Tattenhams
Party	Candidate	Votes	%	±%
Residents	Bob Harper	1,202	64.5	▲1.6
Conservative	Frances Clarke	457	24.5	▲6.4
Labour	Jake Bonner	155	8.3	New
Green	Alistair Morten	50	2.7	New
Majority		745	40.0	▼3.9
Turnout		1,869	32.6	▼4.2
Residents hold		Swing		
