= 2018 Rossendale Borough Council election =

2018 UK local government election

Local election results in Rossendale

The 2018 Rossendale Borough Council election took place on 3 May 2018 to elect members of Rossendale Borough Council in England. This was on the same day as other local elections. Labour remained in control of the council, despite losing one seat to the Conservatives.

== Election result ==
Rossendale local election result 2018
Party	Seats	Gains	Losses	Net gain/loss	Seats %	Votes %	Votes	+/−
Conservative	6	1	0	▲1	50.0	47.9	8,028	▲9.4
Labour	5	0	1	▼1	41.7	47.7	8,002	▲9.1
Community First	1	0	0	Steady	8.3	2.7	460	▼0.5
Independent	0	0	0	Steady	0.0	1.3	225	New
National Front	0	0	0	Steady	0.0	0.3	56	New

== Ward results ==
=== Eden ===
Eden
Party	Candidate	Votes	%	±%
Conservative	Anne Cheetham	680	65.2	▲6.1
Labour	David Rogerson	363	34.8	▲5.8
Majority		317	30.4	▲0.3
Turnout		1,047	37.1	▼1.4
Conservative hold		Swing		

=== Goodshaw ===
Goodshaw
Party	Candidate	Votes	%	±%
Labour	Alyson Barnes	739	51.4	▲0.9
Conservative	David Foxcroft	700	48.6	▲20.3
Majority		39	2.8	▼19.4
Turnout		1,447	46.3	▲7.6
Labour hold		Swing		

=== Greenfield ===
Greenfield
Party	Candidate	Votes	%	±%
Conservative	Richard Morris	959	61.2	▼2.8
Labour	Lisa Bloor	608	38.8	▲2.8
Majority		351	22.4	▼5.6
Turnout		1,578	36.9	▲0.2
Conservative hold		Swing		

=== Greensclough ===
Greensclough
Party	Candidate	Votes	%	±%
Conservative	James Eaton	856	53.3	▲14.0
Labour	Susan Brennan	751	46.7	▲11.9
Majority		105	6.6	▲2.1
Turnout		1,618	37.4	▼0.9
Conservative hold		Swing		

=== Hareholme ===
Hareholme
Party	Candidate	Votes	%	±%
Labour	Christine Gill	873	54.2	▲8.4
Conservative	Mohammed Abdullah	739	45.8	▲17.6
Majority		134	8.4	▼9.2
Turnout		1,618	39.3	▲3.2
Labour hold		Swing		

=== Healey and Whitworth ===
Healey and Whitworth
Party	Candidate	Votes	%	±%
Community First	Ronald Neal	460	48.4	▼11.7
Labour	Rachael Barker	333	35.1	New
Conservative	Jonathan Foxcroft	157	16.5	▲2.2
Majority		127	13.3	▼21.2
Turnout		951	31.9	▲2.2
Community First hold		Swing		

=== Helmshore ===
Helmshore
Party	Candidate	Votes	%	±%
Conservative	Brian Essex	1,188	56.6	▼5.6
Labour	Ross Charnock	911	43.4	▲5.6
Majority		277	13.2	▼11.2
Turnout		2,103	44.4	▲5.5
Conservative hold		Swing		

=== Irwell ===
Irwell
Party	Candidate	Votes	%	±%
Conservative	Denis Kostyan	601	49.1	▲16.5
Labour	Michelle Smith	566	46.3	▲10.5
National Front	Kevin Bryan	56	4.6	New
Majority		35	2.8	N/A
Turnout		1,228	29.2	▼1.6
Conservative gain from Labour		Swing		

=== Longholme ===
Longholme
Party	Candidate	Votes	%	±%
Labour	Joseph Stevens	856	53.9	▲11.0
Conservative	Thomas Blackburn	731	46.1	▲12.8
Majority		125	7.8	▼1.8
Turnout		1,599	36.6	▼3.3
Labour hold		Swing		

=== Stacksteads ===
Stacksteads
Party	Candidate	Votes	%	±%
Labour	Jacqueline Oakes	638	70.5	▲13.9
Conservative	Jennifer Rigby	267	29.5	▲18.0
Majority		371	41.0	▲16.3
Turnout		907	31.9	▲0.2
Labour hold		Swing		

=== Whitewell ===
Whitewell
Party	Candidate	Votes	%	±%
Conservative	Karl Kempson	812	53.6	▲12.8
Labour	Alastair Price	704	46.4	▲6.5
Majority		108	7.2	▲6.3
Turnout		1,531	36.5	▲2.5
Conservative hold		Swing		

=== Worsley ===
Worsley
Party	Candidate	Votes	%	±%
Labour	Ann Kenyon	660	54.0	▲9.1
Conservative	Nicola May	338	27.6	▲3.1
Independent	Granville Barker	225	18.4	New
Majority		322	26.4	▲12.0
Turnout		1,230	29.6	▼3.0
Labour hold		Swing		
