= 2018 Rochford District Council election =

2018 UK local government election

Results of the 2018 Rochford District Council election

The 2018 Rochford District Council election took place on 3 May 2018 to elect members of Rochford District Council in England. This was on the same day as other local elections.

== Results summary ==
Rochford District Council election, 2018
Party	Seats	Gains	Losses	Net gain/loss	Seats %	Votes %	Votes	+/−
Conservative	32	3	0	▲3		47.5	10,353	▲1.4
Rochford Resident	5	0	1	▼1		17.4	3,782	▲5.8
Labour	0	0	0	Steady		13.0	2,844	▲0.2
Liberal Democrats	3	0	1	▼1		11.8	2,573	▲3.0
Green	3	0	0	Steady		5.9	1,293	▼0.6
UKIP	3	0	1	▼1		—	—	▼11.4
Friends of Rochford	0	0	0	Steady		3.8	832	New
Independent	1	0	0	Steady		0.6	120	▼1.9

== Ward results ==
=== Downhall & Rawreth ===
Downhall & Rawreth
Party	Candidate	Votes	%	±%
Liberal Democrats	Christopher Stanley	922	63.9	▲3.5
Conservative	Keith Podd	393	27.3	▲10.7
Labour	Shaun Cain	127	8.8	▲0.9
Majority		529	36.6	▼7.2
Turnout		1442	28.8	▼3.6
Liberal Democrats hold		Swing		

No Rochford Resident candidate as previous (-15.2).

=== Foulness & The Wakerings ===
Foulness & The Wakerings
Party	Candidate	Votes	%	±%
Conservative	Jo McPherson	857	47.8	▲23.2
Friends of Rochford	Tina Hughes	541	30.2	New
Labour	Joanne Ford	276	15.4	▲1.4
Independent	Robert Green	120	6.7	New
Majority		316	17.6	
Turnout		1794	32.9	▲0.9
Conservative gain from UKIP		Swing	▼	

No UKIP candidate as previous (-32.0).

=== Hawkwell East ===
Hawkwell East
Party	Candidate	Votes	%	±%
Conservative	Phil Shawe	641	45.7	▲1.9
Rochford Resident	Steve Hinde	554	39.5	▲2.6
Labour	Ian Rooke	207	14.8	▼4.5
Majority		87	6.2	
Turnout		1402	29.3	▼0.8
Conservative gain from Rochford Resident		Swing	▼0.4	

=== Hawkwell West ===
Hawkwell West
Party	Candidate	Votes	%	±%
Conservative	Julie Gooding	814	48.2	▲18.9
Rochford Resident	Elliot Mason	687	40.7	▼12.3
Labour	Ian Challis	207	14.8	▼2.5
Majority		127	7.5	
Turnout		1708	33.0	▲0.2
Conservative hold		Swing	▲15.6	

=== Hockley ===
Hockley (2)
Party	Candidate	Votes	%	±%
Conservative	Brian Hazlewood	829	51.8	▲14.2
Conservative	Keith Hudson	693	43.3	▲5.7
Rochford Resident	Toni Carter	676	42.3	▼2.9
Liberal Democrats	Nicola O'Riordan Finley	302	18.9	New
Labour	Louise Best	216	13.5	▼3.7
Labour	David Lench	142	8.9	▼8.3
Majority		153	7.6	
Turnout		1,599	32.1	0.0
Conservative hold		Swing	▲7.6	
Conservative gain from Rochford Resident		Swing		

=== Hockley & Ashingdon ===
Hockley & Ashingdon
Party	Candidate	Votes	%	±%
Conservative	Terry Cutmore	795	48.2	▼21.4
Rochford Resident	David Miles	711	43.1	New
Labour	Stephen Willis	144	8.7	▼21.7
Majority		84	5.1	
Turnout		1650	31.7	▲2.3
Conservative hold		Swing	—	

=== Hullbridge ===
Hullbridge
Party	Candidate	Votes	%	±%
Green	Stuart Wilson	1,293	64.2	▲15.9
Conservative	Angela Marriott	583	28.9	▲13.3
Labour	Victoria Williams	138	6.9	▼3.8
Majority		710	35.3	▲12.3
Turnout		2014	37.1	▼3.1
Green hold		Swing	▲1.3	

No UKIP candidate as previous (-25.3).

=== Lodge ===
Lodge
Party	Candidate	Votes	%	±%
Conservative	Simon Smith	1,007	55.7	▲21.4
Rochford Resident	Richard Lambourne	800	44.3	▲22.0
Majority		207	11.4	
Turnout		1807	34.3	▼0.2
Conservative hold		Swing	▼0.3	

No UKIP (-20.7), Labour (-11.3) or Liberal Democrat (-11.3) candidates as previous.

=== Roche North & Rural ===
Roche North & Rural
Party	Candidate	Votes	%	±%
Conservative	Laureen Shaw	659	48.2	▲14.3
Labour	David Flack	417	30.5	▲6.2
Friends of Rochford	Brendon Whitehead	291	21.3	New
Majority		242	17.7	
Turnout		1367	27.4	▼3.1
Conservative hold		Swing	▲4.1	

No UKIP (-30.6) or Liberal Democrat (-11.1) candidates as previous.

=== Roche South ===
Roche South
Party	Candidate	Votes	%	±%
Conservative	Mike Steptoe	536	44.7	▲5.7
Rochford Resident	Phil Capon	354	29.5	New
Labour	Mark Daniels	310	25.8	▼7.1
Majority		182	15.2	
Turnout		1200	29.2	▼0.3
Conservative hold		Swing	▼	

No UKIP candidate as previous (-29.5).

=== Sweyne Park & Grange ===
Sweyne Park & Grange
Party	Candidate	Votes	%	±%
Conservative	Carol Pavelin	784	48.8	▲18.7
Liberal Democrats	James Newport	622	38.7	▲15.7
Labour	Samantha Reed	200	12.5	▼1.9
Majority		162	10.1	
Turnout		1606	32.1	▼1.2
Conservative gain from Liberal Democrats		Swing	▲1.5	

No Rochford Resident candidate as previous (-32.5).

=== Trinity ===
Trinity
Party	Candidate	Votes	%	±%
Conservative	David Merrick	1,313	64.8	▲19.5
Liberal Democrats	Ian Oakley	426	21.0	New
Labour	Roger Neville	287	14.2	▼2.8
Majority		887	43.8	
Turnout		2026	37.3	▼3.0
Conservative hold		Swing	—	

No UKIP candidate as previous (-37.7).

=== Wheatley ===
Wheatley
Party	Candidate	Votes	%	±%
Conservative	Robin Dray	1,142	64.3	▲33.2
Labour	Steve Cooper	333	18.8	▲4.3
Liberal Democrats	Lisa Newport	301	16.9	▲1.4
Majority		809	45.5	
Turnout		1776	35.0	▲1.4
Conservative hold		Swing	▲14.5	

No Independent candidate as previous (-38.9).
