= 2018 Slough Borough Council election =

3 May 2018 event in England

Map showing the results of the 2018 Slough Borough Council election

The 2018 Slough Borough Council election took place on 3 May 2018 to elect members of Slough Borough Council in England. This was on the same day as other local elections.

== Results ==
Slough Borough Council Election, 2018
| Party | Seats | Gains | Losses | Net gain/loss | Seats % | Votes % | Votes | +/− |
|---|---|---|---|---|---|---|---|---|
| Labour | 13 | 2 | 0 | +2 | 92.9% | | | |
| Conservative | 1 | 0 | 2 | -2 | 7.1% | | | |
| Green | 0 | 0 | 0 | 0 | 0.0% | | | |
| Liberal Democrats | 0 | 0 | 0 | 0 | 0.0% | | | |
| UKIP | 0 | 0 | 0 | 0 | 0.0% | | | |
| Independent | 0 | 0 | 0 | 0 | 0.0% | | | |

== Ward results ==
=== Baylis and Stoke ===
Baylis and Stoke
| Party | Candidate | Votes | % |
|---|---|---|---|
| Labour | Fiza Matloob | 2,289 | 88.8 |
| Conservative | David John Munkley | 290 | 11.2 |
| Majority | | 1,999 | 77.6 |
| Turnout | | 2,579 | 40.0 |
| Labour hold | | | |

=== Britwell and Northborough ===
Britwell and Northborough
| Party | Candidate | Votes | % |
|---|---|---|---|
| Labour | Rob Anderson | 1,671 | 80.1 |
| Conservative | Chandni Rajora | 415 | 19.9 |
| Majority | | 1,256 | 60.2 |
| Turnout | | 2,086 | 30.3 |
| Labour hold | | | |

=== Central ===
Central
| Party | Candidate | Votes | % |
|---|---|---|---|
| Labour | Safdar Ali | 1,622 | 78.8 |
| Conservative | Sebastian Rafal Rysnik | 437 | 21.2 |
| Majority | | 1,185 | 57.6 |
| Turnout | | 2,059 | 29.0 |
| Labour hold | | | |

=== Chalvey ===
Chalvey
| Party | Candidate | Votes | % |
|---|---|---|---|
| Labour | Mohammed Sharif | 1,478 | 75.3 |
| Conservative | Greg Duda | 484 | 24.7 |
| Majority | | 994 | 50.6 |
| Turnout | | 1,962 | 28.1 |
| Labour hold | | | |

=== Cippenham Green ===
Cippenham Green
| Party | Candidate | Votes | % |
|---|---|---|---|
| Labour | Roger Francis Davis | 1,206 | 61.4 |
| Conservative | Alfred Gill | 642 | 32.7 |
| UKIP | Nick Smith | 116 | 5.9 |
| Majority | | 564 | 28.7 |
| Turnout | | 1,964 | 28.4 |
| Labour hold | | | |

=== Cippenham Meadows ===
Cippenham Meadows
| Party | Candidate | Votes | % |
|---|---|---|---|
| Labour | Dilbagh Singh Parmar | 1,262 | 59.6 |
| Liberal Democrats | Robert Clive Plimmer | 460 | 21.7 |
| Conservative | Aryan Shivam Rampaul | 397 | 18.7 |
| Majority | | 802 | 37.9 |
| Turnout | | 2,119 | 27.9 |
| Labour hold | | | |

=== Colnbrook with Poyle ===
Colnbrook with Poyle
| Party | Candidate | Votes | % |
|---|---|---|---|
| Labour | Avtar Kaur Cheema | 697 | 52.9 |
| Conservative | Puja Bedi | 620 | 47.1 |
| Majority | | 77 | 5.8 |
| Turnout | | 1,317 | 31.5 |
| Labour hold | | | |

=== Elliman ===
Elliman
| Party | Candidate | Votes | % |
|---|---|---|---|
| Labour | Arvind Singh Dhaliwal | 1,282 | 78.1 |
| Conservative | Lee Scott Pettman | 259 | 15.8 |
| Liberal Democrats | Matthew Benedict Taylor | 101 | 6.2 |
| Majority | | 1,023 | 62.3 |
| Turnout | | 1,642 | 27.3 |
| Labour hold | | | |

=== Farnham ===
Farnham
| Party | Candidate | Votes | % |
|---|---|---|---|
| Labour | Muhammad Waqas Sabah | 1,707 | 70.6 |
| Conservative | Gurcharan Singh Manku | 710 | 29.4 |
| Majority | | 997 | 41.2 |
| Turnout | | 2,417 | 35.8 |
| Labour hold | | | |

=== Haymill and Lynch Hill ===
Haymill and Lynch Hill
| Party | Candidate | Votes | % |
|---|---|---|---|
| Conservative | Anna Wright | 1,093 | 54.7 |
| Labour | Ruqayah Begum | 697 | 34.9 |
| Liberal Democrats | Niccola Caitlin Parkes | 209 | 10.5 |
| Majority | | 396 | 19.8 |
| Turnout | | 1,999 | 28.6 |
| Conservative hold | | | |

=== Langley Kedermister ===
Langley Kedermister
| Party | Candidate | Votes | % |
|---|---|---|---|
| Labour | Preston Brooker | 1,096 | 52.1 |
| Conservative | Meena Sharma | 783 | 37.3 |
| Independent | Sharon Teresa Bernadette O'Reilly | 128 | 6.1 |
| Majority | | 313 | 14.8 |
| Turnout | | 2,102 | 29.6 |
| Labour hold | | | |

=== Langley St Mary's ===
Langley St Mary's
| Party | Candidate | Votes | % |
|---|---|---|---|
| Labour | Harjinder Kaur Minhas | 1,204 | 52.4 |
| Conservative | Christine Bamigbola | 842 | 36.6 |
| Independent | Jonathan James | 127 | 5.5 |
| Green | Julian Edward Jubal Edmonds | 126 | 5.5 |
| Majority | | 362 | 15.8 |
| Turnout | | 2,299 | 32.1 |
| Labour gain from Conservative | | | |

=== Upton ===
Upton
| Party | Candidate | Votes | % |
|---|---|---|---|
| Labour | Balvinder Singh Bains | 1,586 | 58.3 |
| Conservative | Wal Chahal | 1,134 | 41.7 |
| Majority | | 452 | 16.6 |
| Turnout | | 2,720 | 39.4 |
| Labour gain from Conservative | | | |

=== Wexham Lea ===
Wexham Lea
| Party | Candidate | Votes | % |
|---|---|---|---|
| Labour | Haqeeq Asraf Dar | 1,693 | 75.3 |
| Conservative | Darren Edward Holmes | 556 | 24.7 |
| Majority | | 1,137 | 50.6 |
| Turnout | | 2,249 | 33.5 |
| Labour hold | | | |
