= 2018 Basingstoke and Deane Borough Council election =

2018 UK local government election

- 3 May 2018

20 seats of 60 to Basingstoke and Deane Borough Council 31 seats needed for a majority
	First party	Second party	Third party
Party	Conservative	Labour	Liberal Democrats
Seats before	33	20	6
Seats won	8	9	2
Seats after	33	21	5
Seat change	Steady	▲1	▼1
Council control before election
Conservative
Council control after election
Conservative

The 2018 Basingstoke and Deane Borough Council election took place on 3 May 2018 to elect 20 members to Basingstoke and Deane Borough Council, as part of the wider local elections. The seats were last up for election in 2014. The councillor for Basing up for election this year, Onnalee Cubitt, had rejoined the Conservative Party prior to the election and held her seat as a Conservative.

== Results summary ==
The Conservative Party won a seat from the Liberal Democrats in Whitchurch, but themselves lost a seat in Winklebury to Labour. As a result, the number of Conservative seats was steady, with Labour having a net gain of one, and the Liberal Democrats a net loss of one. Independent councillor Ian Tiblury held the sole independent seat.

Basingstoke and Deane Borough Council election 2018
Party	This election				Full council			This election		
Party	Candidates	Seats	Net	Seats %	Other	Total	Total %	Votes	Votes %	+/−
Conservative	{{{candidates}}}	8	Steady	40.00	22	33	55.00	14,938	45.84	
Labour	{{{candidates}}}	9	▲1	45.00	12	21	35.00	10,153	31.15	
Liberal Democrats	{{{candidates}}}	2	▼1	10.00	3	5	8.33	5,676	17.41	
Independent	{{{candidates}}}	1	Steady	5.00	0	1	1.66	1,230	3.77	
Green	{{{candidates}}}	0	Steady	0.00	0	0	0	246	0.75	
UKIP	{{{candidates}}}	0	Steady	0.00	0	0	0	211	0.64	
TUSC	{{{candidates}}}	0	Steady	0.00	0	0	0	72	0.22	

== Results by ward ==
=== Basing ===
Basing
Party	Candidate	Votes	%	±%
Conservative	Onnalee Cubitt	1,679	69.00	
Liberal Democrats	Richard Lilleker	425	17.46	
Labour	Alex Lee	329	13.52	
Turnout				
Conservative hold		Swing		

=== Brighton Hill North ===
Brighton Hill North
Party	Candidate	Votes	%	±%
Labour	Mark Taylor	452	35.59	
Liberal Democrats	Andy Konieckzo	440	34.64	
Conservative	Shane Grimes	353	27.79	
TUSC	Mick Butler	25	1.96	
Turnout				
Labour hold		Swing		

=== Brighton Hill South ===
Brighton Hill South
Party	Candidate	Votes	%	±%
Labour	Kim Taylor	541	49.63	
Conservative	Richard Court	345	31.65	
Libertarian	Scott Neville	72	6.60	
UKIP	Michael Thompson	72	6.60	
Liberal Democrats	James Belchamber	60	5.50	
Turnout				
Labour hold		Swing		

=== Brookvale and Kings Furlong ===
Brookvale and Kings Furlong
Party	Candidate	Votes	%	±%
Labour	Michael Westbrook	724	45.36	
Conservative	Arun Mummalaneni	529	33.14	
Liberal Democrats	Doris Jones	234	14.66	
Independent	Alan Stone	109	6.82	
Turnout				
Labour hold		Swing		

=== Buckskin ===
Buckskin
Party	Candidate	Votes	%	±%
Labour	Stephanie Grant	683	52.25	
Conservative	Edward Norman	485	37.10	
Liberal Democrats	Hedley Proctor	83	6.35	
Independent	Stan Tennison	56	4.28	
Turnout				
Labour hold		Swing		

=== Burghclere, Highclere and St Mary Bourne ===
Burghclere, Highclere and St Mary Bourne
Party	Candidate	Votes	%	±%
Conservative	Graham Falconer	1,123	72.87	
Liberal Democrats	Pauleen Malone	253	16.41	
Labour	John Rodway	165	10.70	
Turnout				
Conservative hold		Swing		

=== Chineham ===
Chineham
Party	Candidate	Votes	%	±%
Conservative	Paul Miller	1,487	72.60	
Labour	Mary Brian	306	14.94	
Liberal Democrats	Michael Hall	255	12.45	
Turnout				
Conservative hold		Swing		

=== East Woodhay ===
East Woodhay
Party	Candidate	Votes	%	±%
Conservative	Clive Sanders	595	71.94	
Liberal Democrats	Monty Abram	152	18.37	
Labour	Christopher Whitehead	80	9.67	
Turnout				
Conservative hold		Swing		

=== Eastrop ===
Eastrop
Party	Candidate	Votes	%	±%
Liberal Democrats	Gavin James	692	51.29	
Labour	Sajish Tom	322	23.86	
Conservative	Rebecca Sanders	279	20.68	
Independent	Duncan Stone	56	4.15	
Turnout				
Liberal Democrats hold		Swing		

=== Grove ===
Grove
Party	Candidate	Votes	%	±%
Liberal Democrats	John McKay	1,109	62.93	
Conservative	Nicholas Bates	428	24.29	
Labour	Gill Gleeson	225	12.76	
Turnout				
Liberal Democrats hold		Swing		

=== Hatch Warren and Beggarwood ===
Hatch Warren and Beggarwood
Party	Candidate	Votes	%	±%
Conservative	Terri Reid	1,230	67.47	
Labour	Daniel O'Loughlin	358	19.63	
Liberal Democrats	Madeline Hussey	235	12.89	
Turnout				
Conservative hold		Swing		

=== Kempshott ===
Kempshott
Party	Candidate	Votes	%	±%
Conservative	Hayley Eachus	1,298	66.76	
Labour	Grand Donohoe	412	21.19	
Liberal Democrats	Stavroulla	385	12.0	
Turnout				
Conservative hold		Swing		

=== Norden ===
Norden
Party	Candidate	Votes	%	±%
Labour	Laura James	1,183	65.57	
Conservative	Jim Holder	428	23.72	
Liberal Democrats	Stephen Whitechurch	89	4.93	
Independent	Steve James-Bailey	68	3.76	
TUSC	Mayola Demmenie	36	1.99	
Turnout				
Labour hold		Swing		

=== Oakley and North Waltham ===
Oakley and North Waltham
Party	Candidate	Votes	%	±%
Conservative	Stuart Frost	1,342	63.33	
Labour	Julie Pierce	391	18.45	
Liberal Democrats	Robert Cooper	288	13.59	
Green	Ian James	98	4.62	
Turnout				
Conservative hold		Swing		

=== Overton, Laverstoke and Steventon ===
Overton, Laverstoke and Steventon
Party	Candidate	Votes	%	±%
Independent	Ian Tilbury	941	53.67	
Conservative	Alex Hedger	545	31.08	
Liberal Democrats	Lucy Sloane Williams	168	9.58	
Green	Kirsten Griffiths	99	5.64	
Turnout				
Independent hold		Swing		

=== Popley East ===
Popley East
Party	Candidate	Votes	%	±%
Labour	David Potter	744	64.75	
Conservative	Andrew Clarke	287	24.97	
Liberal Democrats	Zoe Rogers	118	10.26	
Turnout				
Labour hold		Swing		

=== Popley West ===
Popley West
Party	Candidate	Votes	%	±%
Labour	Paul Frankum	677	63.33	
Conservative	Chris Hendon	278	26.00	
Liberal Democrats	Michael Berwick-Gooding	114	10.66	
Turnout				
Labour hold		Swing		

=== South Ham ===
South Ham
Party	Candidate	Votes	%	±%
Labour	Sean Keating	1,052	53.37	
Conservative	Lily Turner	684	34.70	
UKIP	Alan Simpson	139	7.05	
Liberal Democrats	Ted Blackmore-Squires	96	4.87	
Turnout				
Labour hold		Swing		

=== Whitchurch ===
Whitchurch
Party	Candidate	Votes	%	±%
Conservative	Dave George	717	40.25	
Labour	Claire Isbester	625	35.09	
Liberal Democrats	Linds Stephney	439	24.64	
Turnout				
Conservative gain from Liberal Democrats		Swing		

=== Winklebury ===
Winklebury
Party	Candidate	Votes	%	±%
Labour	Ruth Cooper	884	49.11	
Conservative	Laura Edwards	826	45.88	
Green	Michael Nightingale	49	2.72	
Liberal Democrats	Lisa Proctor	41	2.27	
Turnout				
Labour gain from Liberal Democrats		Swing		
