= 2018 Maidstone Borough Council election =

2018 UK local government election

Results of the 2018 Maidstone District Council election

The 2018 Maidstone Borough Council elections took place on 3 May 2018 to elect members of Maidstone Borough Council in Kent, England. The council remained in no overall control, with the Conservatives overtaking the Liberal Democrats as the largest party on the council.

== Election result ==
Maidstone local election result 2018
Party	Seats	Gains	Losses	Net gain/loss	Seats %	Votes %	Votes	+/−
Conservative	9	4	0	▲4	50.0	44.4	14,456	▲16.9
Liberal Democrats	6	0	3	▼3	33.3	29.2	9,489	▲4.6
Labour	2	1	0	▲1	11.1	17.8	5,798	▲7.1
Independent	1	0	0	Steady	5.6	4.6	1,509	▼0.6
Green	0	0	0	Steady	0.0	4.0	1,295	▼1.6

== Ward results ==
=== Allington ===
Allington
Party	Candidate	Votes	%	±%
Liberal Democrats	Dan Daley	1,487	62.5	▲12.1
Conservative	Barry Ginley	688	28.9	▲9.8
Labour	Marianna Poliszczuk	206	8.7	▲2.0
Majority		799	33.6	▲4.7
Turnout		2,386		
Liberal Democrats hold		Swing		

=== Bearsted ===
Bearsted
Party	Candidate	Votes	%	±%
Conservative	Mike Cuming	1,574	69.2	▲31.0
Labour	Jim Grogan	417	18.3	▲9.0
Liberal Democrats	Lizzie Hare	284	12.5	▲9.0
Majority		1,157	50.9	▲36.3
Turnout		2,288	35	
Conservative hold		Swing		

=== Boxley ===
Boxley
Party	Candidate	Votes	%	±%
Conservative	Bob Hinder	1,404	73.8	▲28.6
Labour	Richard Atkins	288	15.1	▲4.2
Liberal Democrats	Andrew Cockersole	210	11.0	▲5.3
Majority		1,116	58.7	▲46.9
Turnout		1,907		
Conservative hold		Swing		

=== Bridge ===
Bridge
Party	Candidate	Votes	%	±%
Conservative	Jonathan Purle	650	41.0	▲14.3
Liberal Democrats	David Pickett	540	34.0	▲2.9
Green	Donna Greenan	226	14.2	▲5.8
Labour	Bruce Heald	170	10.7	▲0.3
Majority		110	7.0	N/A
Turnout		1,592	34	
Conservative gain from Liberal Democrats		Swing		

=== Coxheath and Hunton ===
Coxheath and Hunton
Party	Candidate	Votes	%	±%
Conservative	Lottie Parfitt-Reid	1,083	48.4	▲21.4
Liberal Democrats	Brian Mortimer	938	41.9	▲2.0
Labour	Madeline Darby	134	6.0	▼0.8
Green	Mike Summersgill	81	3.6	New
Majority		145	6.5	N/A
Turnout		2,240	38	
Conservative gain from Liberal Democrats		Swing		

=== East ===
East
Party	Candidate	Votes	%	±%
Liberal Democrats	Nikki Fissenden	979	47.2	▲11.1
Conservative	Cheryl Maggio	695	33.5	▲9.3
Labour	Joanna Burns	296	14.3	▲6.2
Green	James Shalice	103	5.0	▼0.7
Majority		284	13.7	▲3.6
Turnout		2,086	33	
Liberal Democrats hold		Swing		

=== Fant ===
Fant
Party	Candidate	Votes	%	±%
Labour	Paul Harper	1,055	51.0	▲27.4
Conservative	Graham Jarvis	549	26.5	▲8.6
Liberal Democrats	Rosaline Janko	296	14.3	▼2.3
Green	Ian McDonald	170	8.2	▼12.2
Majority		506	24.5	▲22.4
Turnout		2,078	30	
Labour hold		Swing		

=== Harrietsham and Lenham ===
Harrietsham and Lenham
Party	Candidate	Votes	%	±%
Independent	Janetta Sams	995	54.8	▲10.5
Conservative	Karen Chappell-Tay	650	35.8	▲11.9
Labour	Greg Levitt	106	5.8	0.0
Green	Susan Parr	65	3.6	New
Majority		345	19.0	▲0.7
Turnout		1,821	37	
Independent hold		Swing		

=== Headcorn ===
Headcorn
Party	Candidate	Votes	%	±%
Conservative	Martin Round	1,105	74.8	▲26.0
Liberal Democrats	Merilyn Fraser	214	14.5	New
Labour	Geoff Harvey	159	10.8	▲3.8
Majority		891	60.3	▲44.1
Turnout		1,484	36	
Conservative hold		Swing		

=== Heath ===
Heath
Party	Candidate	Votes	%	±%
Liberal Democrats	Ashleigh Kimmance	636	46.3	▲3.3
Conservative	Alan Chell	392	28.5	▲8.2
Labour	Ben Crozier	264	19.2	▲8.5
Green	Geoff Wilkinson	83	6.0	▲1.4
Majority		244	17.8	▼3.9
Turnout		1,383	30	
Liberal Democrats hold		Swing		

=== High Street ===
High Street
Party	Candidate	Votes	%	±%
Liberal Democrats	Clive English	742	42.0	▲11.5
Conservative	Samuel Lain-Rose	461	26.1	▲8.9
Labour	Tim Licence	428	24.2	▲11.5
Green	Kimmy Falconer	135	7.6	▲0.1
Majority		281	15.9	▲14.2
Turnout		1,776	24	
Liberal Democrats hold		Swing		

=== Marden and Yalding ===
Marden and Yalding
Party	Candidate	Votes	%	±%
Conservative	David Burton	1,178	57.2	▲23.4
Liberal Democrats	Sarah Rowe	429	20.8	▼11.2
Labour	Richard Coates	271	13.1	▲6.6
Green	Caroline Jessel	183	8.9	▲4.8
Majority		749	36.4	▲34.6
Turnout		2,075	33	
Conservative hold		Swing		

=== North ===
North
Party	Candidate	Votes	%	±%
Liberal Democrats	Tony Harwood	971	52.2	▲10.3
Conservative	Joseph Mamo	524	28.2	▲11.4
Labour	Maureen Cleator	282	15.2	▲6.1
Green	Stuart Jeffery	84	4.5	▼4.3
Majority		447	24.0	▲5.5
Turnout		1,867	30	
Liberal Democrats hold		Swing		

=== Park Wood ===
Park Wood
Party	Candidate	Votes	%	±%
Conservative	Daniel Rose	552	47.4	▲23.6
Labour	Dan Wilkinson	528	45.4	▲26.8
Liberal Democrats	Dinesh Khadka	84	7.2	▲2.4
Majority		24	2.0	N/A
Turnout		1,165	23	
Conservative gain from UKIP		Swing		

=== Shepway North ===
Shepway North
Party	Candidate	Votes	%	±%
Conservative	Alan Bartlett	881	52.1	▲24.7
Labour	Kris Jeary	366	21.6	▲4.8
Liberal Democrats	Steve Beerling	222	13.1	▼1.3
Green	Stephen Muggeridge	85	5.0	▼0.9
Independent	Carol Newton	81	4.8	New
Independent	Gary Butler	56	3.3	New
Majority		515	30.5	N/A
Turnout		1,697	27	
Conservative gain from UKIP		Swing		

=== Shepway South ===
Shepway South
Party	Candidate	Votes	%	±%
Labour	Malcolm McKay	364	40.8	▲13.3
Conservative	Paul Cooper	313	35.1	▲12.8
Independent	John Barned	215	24.1	New
Majority		51	5.7	N/A
Turnout		894	22	
Labour gain from UKIP		Swing		

=== South ===
South
Party	Candidate	Votes	%	±%
Liberal Democrats	Derek Mortimer	1,235	50.1	▲9.5
Conservative	Paul Wooding	758	30.7	▲3.9
Labour	Wendy Hollands	232	9.4	▲3.2
Independent	Mike Hogg	139	5.6	New
Green	Steven Cheeseman	80	3.2	▲0.1
Independent	Yolande Kenward	23	0.9	New
Majority		477	19.4	▲5.6
Turnout		2,467	35	
Liberal Democrats hold		Swing		

=== Staplehurst ===
Staplehurst
Party	Candidate	Votes	%	±%
Conservative	John Perry	999	68.8	▲35.9
Labour	Marlyn Randall	232	16.0	▲8.2
Liberal Democrats	Andrew Watson	222	15.3	▼11.8
Majority		767	52.8	▲47.0
Turnout		1,459	32	
Conservative hold		Swing		
