= 2018 Tandridge District Council election =

2018 UK local government election

Results of the 2018 Tandridge District Council election

The 2018 Tandridge District Council election took place on 3 May 2018 to elect members of Tandridge District Council in Surrey, England. One third of the council was up for election and the Conservative Party narrowly stayed in overall control of the council.

After the election, the composition of the council was:

- Conservative 22
- Liberal Democrats 9
- Independent 7
- Residents' Group 4

== Election result ==
The Conservative group lost eight seats at the election, a net loss of nine from 2014 (by-election loss to Oxted & Limpsfield Residents' Group (OLRG) in Limpsfield ward - Oct, 2016). The Liberal Democrats gained three of these seats, independents took three with OLRG taking the other three, including Limpsfield they had won in the by-election. This left the Conservatives with 22 councillors, compared to 9 for the Liberal Democrats, 7 Independents and 4 in the residents' group. A Conservative majority of one. Overall turnout at the election was 41%.

Tandridge local election result 2018
Party	Seats	Gains	Losses	Net gain/loss	Seats %	Votes %	Votes	+/−
Conservative	4	0	9	-9	28.6	35.6	7,481	-10.7%
Liberal Democrats	4	3	0	+3	28.6	20.1	4,239	+1.9%
Residents	3	3	0	+3	21.4	17.4	3,655	+17.4%
Independent	3	3	0	+3	21.4	15.0	3,161	+15.0%
Labour	0	0	0	0	0	8.7	1,832	-1.2%
UKIP	0	0	0	0	0	3.2	674	-22.4%

== Ward results ==
An asterisk* indicates an incumbent seeking re-election.

Bletchingley and Nutfield
Party	Candidate	Votes	%	±%
Conservative	Tony Elias*	775	49.6	−2.1
UKIP	Helena Windsor	343	21.9	−6.0
Liberal Democrats	Richard Fowler	267	17.1	+6.6
Labour	Linda Baharier	178	11.4	+2.4
Majority		432	27.7	+3.9
Turnout		1,563	35.3	−7.0
Conservative hold		Swing		

Burstow, Horne and Outwood
Party	Candidate	Votes	%	±%
Independent	Kevin Bourne	926	51.4	+51.4
Conservative	Peter Bond*	695	38.5	−12.2
Labour	Fern Warwick-Ching	119	6.6	−3.6
Liberal Democrats	Judy Wilkinson	63	3.5	−3.7
Majority		231	12.9	−5.9
Turnout		1,803	38.2	−3.4
Independent gain from Conservative		Swing	+31.8	

Dormansland and Felcourt
Party	Candidate	Votes	%	±%
Independent	Nicholas White	520	44.1	+44.1
Conservative	Maureen Young*	508	43.1	−13.8
Liberal Democrats	Tony Hardisty	86	7.3	−9.1
Labour	Ann Seuret	64	5.4	+5.4
Majority		12	1.0	−29.1
Turnout		1,178	38.5	−2.5
Independent gain from Conservative		Swing	+29.0	

Godstone
Party	Candidate	Votes	%	±%
Independent	Chris Farr	1,305	65.6	+65.6
Conservative	Rose Thorn*	423	21.3	−19.6
Labour	Barbara Wantling	147	7.4	−0.5
Liberal Democrats	Tamzie Hollands	115	5.8	−8.5
Majority		882	44.3	+40.4
Turnout		1,990	44.4	+2.1
Independent gain from Conservative		Swing	+24.1	

Harestone
Party	Candidate	Votes	%	±%
Conservative	Beverley Connolly*	663	51.4	+0.6
Liberal Democrats	Annette Evans	461	35.8	+20.1
Labour	Mark Wood	129	10.0	−1.9
UKIP	Martin Ferguson	36	2.8	−19.0
Majority		202	15.6	−13.1
Turnout		1,289	41.4	+0.1
Conservative hold		Swing		

Limpsfield
Party	Candidate	Votes	%	±%
Residents	Phil Davies	918	64.3	+64.3
Conservative	Zee Lapthorne	416	29.1	−29.3
Liberal Democrats	Martin Caxton	59	4.1	−10.6
Labour	Alec McNally	35	2.5	−3.5
Majority		502	35.2	−2.4
Turnout		1,428	50.5	+1.7
Residents gain from Conservative		Swing	+36.8	

Lingfield and Crowhurst
Party	Candidate	Votes	%	±%
Conservative	Mark Ridge	525	42.7	−12.5
Independent	Michael Sydney	410	33.4	+33.4
Liberal Democrats	Dave Wilkes	150	12.2	+2.9
Labour	Rebecca Pritchard	144	11.7	+1.8
Majority		115	9.3	−20.3
Turnout		1,229	38.3	−1.2
Conservative hold		Swing		

Oxted North and Tandridge
Party	Candidate	Votes	%	±%
Residents	Catherine Sayer	1,531	67.6	+67.6
Conservative	David Weightman*	548	24.2	−26.9
Labour	Che Ramsden	100	4.4	−10.0
Liberal Democrats	Craig Shepherd	85	3.8	−13.8
Majority		983	43.4	+13.1
Turnout		2,264	51.6	+4.9
Residents gain from Conservative		Swing	+36.9	

Oxted South
Party	Candidate	Votes	%	±%
Residents	Lynn Mills	1,206	57.6	+57.6
Conservative	Julie Bird	480	22.9	−16.6
Labour	Katherine Saunders	296	14.1	−14.4
Liberal Democrats	Jonathan Salisbury	111	5.3	−4.6
Majority		726	34.7	+23.6
Turnout		2,093	44.2	+1.0
Residents gain from Conservative		Swing	+37.1	

Queens Park
Party	Candidate	Votes	%	±%
Liberal Democrats	John Orrick	755	58.7	+27.3
Conservative	Rod Stead*	415	32.3	−10.2
Labour	Eddington Pindura	74	5.8	−1.4
UKIP	Graham Bailey	42	3.3	−15.6
Majority		340	26.4	+15.3
Turnout		1,286	43.9	−1.3
Liberal Democrats gain from Conservative		Swing	+18.8	

Warlingham East and Chelsham and Farleigh
Party	Candidate	Votes	%	±%
Liberal Democrats	Simon Morrow*	833	49.5	+9.8
Conservative	Nathan Adams	590	35.0	+7.9
UKIP	Martin Haley	141	8.4	−19.5
Labour	Michael Snowden	120	7.1	+1.8
Majority		243	14.5	+2.6
Turnout		1,684	39.5	−6.4
Liberal Democrats hold		Swing		

Warlingham West
Party	Candidate	Votes	%	±%
Conservative	Robin Bloore	654	62.2	+10.6
Liberal Democrats	Celia Caulcott	286	27.2	+6.5
Labour	Patrick Rogers	70	6.7	+6.7
UKIP	Christopher Dean	42	4.0	−23.7
Majority		368	35.0	+11.2
Turnout		1,052	38.8	−4.8
Conservative hold		Swing		

Westway
Party	Candidate	Votes	%	±%
Liberal Democrats	George Dennis	485	42.2	+16.2
Conservative	Eithne Webster*	398	34.8	−0.3
Labour	Lucy McNally	223	19.5	+4.3
UKIP	Joe Branco	38	3.3	−20.5
Majority		87	7.4	+1.7
Turnout		1,144	33.7	−0.8
Liberal Democrats gain from Conservative		Swing	+8.3	

Whyteleafe
Party	Candidate	Votes	%	±%
Liberal Democrats	Jeffrey Gray	483	46.5	+19.3
Conservative	Sakina Bradbury*	391	37.6	−5.0
Labour	Fatima Kamara	133	12.8	+2.3
UKIP	Grayson Clarke	32	3.1	−16.5
Majority		92	8.9	−6.5
Turnout		1,039	34.3	−3.7
Liberal Democrats gain from Conservative		Swing	+12.2	
