= 2018 Pendle Borough Council election =

2018 UK local government election

Results of the 2018 Pendle Borough Council election

The 2018 Pendle Borough Council Election took place on 3 May 2018.

== Background ==
Before the election, the Conservatives had 23 councillors, with Labour on 15 and the Liberal Democrats on 9. There was currently no overall control on Pendle Borough Council. 16 seats were up for election.

The last BNP Councillor in the UK, Brian Parker (Marsden Ward Councillor), retired at the election, and supported the Labour candidate in his ward.

== Election result ==
Pendle local election result 2018
Party	Seats	Gains	Losses	Net gain/loss	Seats %	Votes %	Votes	+/−
Conservative	24			+3	49			
Labour	17			-2	35			
Liberal Democrats	9			-1	18			
Green	0	0	0	0	0			

== Ward results ==
Barrowford
Party	Candidate	Votes	%	±%
Conservative	Christian Wakeford	1,103	74.6	
Labour	Manzar Iqbal	376	25.4	
Majority		727	49.2	
Turnout		1,492	38.58	
Conservative hold		Swing		

Boulsworth
Party	Candidate	Votes	%	±%
Conservative	Paul John Foxley	938	60.3	
Labour	Mark Anthony Attwood	311	20.0	
Liberal Democrats	Heather Ann Greeves	306	19.7	
Majority		627	40.3	
Turnout		1,558	37.70	
Conservative hold		Swing		

Bradley
Party	Candidate	Votes	%	±%
Labour	Mohammed Iqbal	1,304	52.1	
Conservative	Mohammad Aslam	1,197	47.9	
Majority		107	4.2	
Turnout		2,518	55.16	
Labour hold		Swing		

Brierfield
Party	Candidate	Votes	%	±%
Labour	Mohammed Arshad	1,201	69.9	
Conservative	David Michael Brown	516	30.1	
Majority		685	39.8	
Turnout		1,731	47.01	
Labour hold		Swing		

Clover Hill
Party	Candidate	Votes	%	±%
Labour	Kathleen Eleanor Shore	854	73.4	
Conservative	Michelle Emma Pearson-Asher	309	26.6	
Majority		545	46.8	
Turnout		1,179	32.69	
Labour hold		Swing		

Coates
Party	Candidate	Votes	%	±%
Liberal Democrats	Tom Whipp	755	46.1	
Conservative	Ian James Lyons	559	34.1	
Labour	Heather Mary Sheldrick	278	17.0	
Green	Jane Veronica Bailes Wood	45	2.7	
Majority		196	12.0	
Turnout		1,640	39.47	
Liberal Democrats gain from Conservative		Swing		

Craven
Party	Candidate	Votes	%	±%
Liberal Democrats	David Michael Baxter Whipp	1,020	64.9	
Conservative	Harry Purcell	410	26.1	
Labour	Ahmed Omar	141	9.0	
Majority		610	38.8	
Turnout		1,575	37.83	
Liberal Democrats hold		Swing		

Earby
Party	Candidate	Votes	%	±%
Conservative	Mike Goulthorp	935	53.2	
Liberal Democrats	Dorris June Haigh	369	21.0	
Labour	Yvonne Marion Tennant	337	19.2	
Green	Charlotte Lisa Carmen	117	6.7	
Majority		566	32.2	
Turnout		1,763	37.15	
Conservative hold		Swing		

Horsfield
Party	Candidate	Votes	%	±%
Conservative	Neil Butterworth	583	51.8	
Labour Co-op	David Kenneth Foat	392	34.8	
Liberal Democrats	Mary Elizabeth Thomas	151	13.4	
Majority		191	17.0	
Turnout		1,133	30.56	
Conservative hold		Swing		

Marsden
Party	Candidate	Votes	%	±%
Conservative	Neil McGowan	588	59.0	
Labour	Laura Michelle Blackburn	409	41.0	
Majority		179	18.0	
Turnout		1,003	38.88	
Conservative gain from BNP		Swing		

Reedley
Party	Candidate	Votes	%	±%
Labour	Yasser Iqbal	1,511	64.4	
Conservative	Ben Eric Spedding	711	30.3	
Liberal Democrats	James Wood	124	5.3	
Majority		800	34.1	
Turnout		2,351	54.17	
Labour hold		Swing		

Southfield
Party	Candidate	Votes	%	±%
Labour	Mohammad Ammer	844	69.2	
Conservative	Nigel Pearson-Asher	375	30.8	
Majority		469	38.4	
Turnout		1,225	31.04	
Labour hold		Swing		

Vivary Bridge
Party	Candidate	Votes	%	±%
Conservative	Victoria Ann Fletcher	529	41.3	
Liberal Democrats	David Clegg	488	38.1	
Labour	Patricia Josephine Hannah-Wood	264	20.6	
Majority		41	3.2	
Turnout		1,287	30.63	
Conservative gain from Liberal Democrats		Swing		

Walverden
Party	Candidate	Votes	%	±%
Labour	Julie May Patricia Henderson	809	78.7	
Conservative	Raja Yasser Rauf	219	21.3	
Majority		590	57.4	
Turnout		1,032	39.24	
Labour hold		Swing		

Waterside
Party	Candidate	Votes	%	±%
Liberal Democrats	Dorothy Elizabeth Lord	510	40.1	
Conservative	Ash Sutcliffe	454	35.7	
Labour	Tony Harmson	260	20.5	
Green	David Richard John Penney	47	3.7	
Majority		56	4.4	
Turnout		1,275	34.17	
Liberal Democrats hold		Swing		

Whitefield
Party	Candidate	Votes	%	±%
Labour	Asjad Mahmood	1,103	55.3	
Conservative	Matloob Ahmend	893	44.7	
Majority		210	10.6	
Turnout		2,004	70.61	
Labour hold		Swing		
