= 2018 Hartlepool Borough Council election =

2018 UK local government election

Map showing the results of the 2018 Hartlepool Borough Council election

The 2018 Hartlepool Borough Council election took place on 3 May 2018 to elect members of Hartlepool Borough Council in England. This was on the same day as other local elections.

== Ward results ==
=== Burn Valley ===
Burn Valley
Party	Candidate	Votes	%	±%
Independent	John Lauderdale	763	49.6%	
Labour	Karen Oliver	496	32.2%	
Conservative	Ben Marshall	279	18.1%	
Majority		267	17.4%	
Turnout				
Independent gain from Labour		Swing		

=== De Bruce ===
De Bruce
Party	Candidate	Votes	%	±%
Labour	Rob Cook	684	52.5%	
Independent	James Barker	219	16.8%	
Conservative	Mike Young	204	15.7%	
For Britain	Karen King	195	15.0%	
Majority		465	35.7%	
Turnout				
Labour hold		Swing		

=== Fens & Rossmere ===
Fens & Rossmere
Party	Candidate	Votes	%	±%
Independent	Tony Richardson	827	41.8%	
Labour	Alan Clark	715	36.1%	
Conservative	Dennis Loynes	373	18.8%	
Green	Tom Casey	65	3.3%	
Majority		112	5.7%	N/A
Turnout				
Putting Hartlepool First gain from Labour		Swing		
