= 2018 Craven District Council election =

2018 UK local government election

Map of the results

The 2018 Craven District Council election took place on 3 May 2018 to elect members of Craven District Council in North Yorkshire, England. One third of the council was up for election and the Conservative party stayed in overall control of the council.

== Overall result ==
Craven local election results 2018
Party	Seats	Gains	Losses	Net gain/loss	Seats %	Votes %	Votes	+/−
Conservative	7	0	0	Steady	77.8	46.4	4,267	▼5.2
Independent	2	0	0	Steady	22.2	18.4	1,691	▼1.9
Labour	0	0	0	Steady	0.0	25.7	2,368	▲1.0
Green	0	0	0	Steady	0.0	8.6	792	New
UKIP	0	0	0	Steady	0.0	0.9	79	▼2.5

== Ward results ==
=== Aire Valley with Lothersdale ===
Aire Valley with Lothersdale
Party	Candidate	Votes	%	±%
Conservative	Patrick Mulligan	598	48.3	▼13.6
Green	William Morton	395	31.9	New
Labour	Brian McDaid	244	19.7	▼18.4
Majority		203	16.4	▼7.4
Turnout		1,239	42.7	▲1.0
Conservative hold		Swing		

=== Bentham ===
Bentham
Party	Candidate	Votes	%	±%
Conservative	Linda Brockbank	472	42.9	▼27.0
Labour	John Matthew	344	31.3	▲1.2
Independent	Tim Stannard	284	25.8	New
Majority		128	11.6	▼28.2
Turnout		1,105	37.8	▲15.7
Conservative hold		Swing		

=== Gargrave and Malhamdale ===
Gargrave and Malhamdale
Party	Candidate	Votes	%	±%
Conservative	Alan Sutcliffe	685	69.3	▼2.5
Labour	Nick Parker	303	30.7	▲2.5
Majority		382	38.6	▼5.0
Turnout		997	38.9	▼1.7
Conservative hold		Swing		

=== Glusburn ===
Glusburn
Party	Candidate	Votes	%	±%
Independent	Philip Barrett	657	63.2	▲5.7
Conservative	Patricia Bartlett	225	21.6	▲13.0
Labour	Paul Routledge	158	15.2	▲6.5
Majority		432	41.6	▲9.3
Turnout		1,042	33.8	▼7.4
Independent hold		Swing		

=== Hellifield and Long Preston ===
Hellifield and Long Preston
Party	Candidate	Votes	%	±%
Conservative	Chris Moorby	480	76.6	▲4.3
Labour	John Pope	147	23.4	▼4.3
Majority		333	53.2	▲8.6
Turnout		630	35.4	▼3.6
Conservative hold		Swing		

=== Ingleton and Clapham ===
Ingleton and Clapham
Party	Candidate	Votes	%	±%
Conservative	Carl Lis	701	48.5	▼10.4
Green	Sarah Wiltshire	397	27.5	New
Labour	Janine Bickerstaff	219	15.2	▲0.4
Independent	Tony Macaulay	127	8.8	▼17.5
Majority		304	21.0	▼11.6
Turnout		1,447	46.0	▲4.8
Conservative hold		Swing		

=== Penyghent ===
Penyghent
Party	Candidate	Votes	%	±%
Conservative	Richard Welch	432	68.5	▼1.3
Labour	Virpi Kettu	166	26.3	▼3.9
UKIP	Bernard Akin	33	5.2	New
Majority		266	42.2	▲2.6
Turnout		640	43.0	▲0.1
Conservative hold		Swing		

=== Settle and Ribblebanks ===
Settle and Ribblebanks
Party	Candidate	Votes	%	±%
Conservative	David Staveley	674	50.7	▼17.5
Labour	Simon Lord	610	45.9	▲14.1
UKIP	Tony Smith	46	3.5	New
Majority		64	4.8	▼31.6
Turnout		1,343	42.8	▲4.8
Conservative hold		Swing		

=== Sutton-in-Craven ===
Sutton-in-Craven
Party	Candidate	Votes	%	±%
Independent	Stephen Place	623	77.9	▼3.1
Labour	Anthony Alderson	177	22.1	▲3.1
Majority		446	55.8	▼6.2
Turnout		804	28.0	▼7.2
Independent hold		Swing		
