= 2018 Elmbridge Borough Council election =

Elmbridge Borough Council election

Results of the 2018 Elmbridge Borough Council election

The 2018 Elmbridge Borough Council election took place on 3 May 2018 to elect members of Elmbridge Borough Council in England. This was on the same day as other local elections. The Conservatives gained four seats at the election, whilst losing one, taking them to exactly half the seats on the council. This meant that the council remained in no overall control.

== Ward results ==
=== Claygate ===
Claygate
Party	Candidate	Votes	%	±%
Liberal Democrats	Mike Rollings	1,427	56.3	+7.8
Conservative	Mark Sugden	988	39.0	+2.2
Labour	Vera-Anne Anderson	121	4.8	−6.8
Majority				
Turnout		2,539	46.3	
Liberal Democrats hold		Swing		

=== Cobham and Downside ===
Cobham and Downside
Party	Candidate	Votes	%	±%
Conservative	James Browne	1,280	66.4	+13.7
Liberal Democrats	Zelda Pitman	268	13.9	−16.1
Labour	Irene Threlkeld	253	13.1	−5.6
UKIP	Elaine Kingston	128	6.6	−12.5
Majority				
Turnout		1,931	30.5	
Conservative hold		Swing		

=== Esher ===
Esher
Party	Candidate	Votes	%	±%
Conservative	Simon Waugh	1,142	49.2	+11.6
Esher Residents' Association	Richard Williams	840	36.2	−4.8
Labour	Susan Dennis	186	8.0	N/A
Green	Laura Harmour	151	6.5	−5.7
Majority				
Turnout		2,325	35.9	
Conservative gain from Residents		Swing		

=== Hersham Village ===
Hersham Village
Party	Candidate	Votes	%	±%
Conservative	Ruth Mitchell	1,152	48.8	+17.2
Hersham Village Society	Anne Hill-Purcell	640	27.1	−10.0
Labour	Julie Crook	314	13.3	−3.9
Green	Olivia Palmer	256	10.8	−10.1
Majority				
Turnout		2,369	38.4	
Conservative gain from Residents		Swing		

=== Hinchley Wood and Weston Green ===
Hinchley Wood and Weston Green
Party	Candidate	Votes	%	±%
Hinchley Wood / Weston Green Residents' Associations	Nigel Haig-Brown	1,762	70.3	-1.8
Conservative	Geoff Herbert	437	17.4	−0.6
Liberal Democrats	Liz Ambekar	236	9.4	N/A
Labour	Jacqueline Andrews	71	2.8	N/A
Majority				
Turnout		2,508	39.5	
Residents hold		Swing		

=== Long Ditton ===
Long Ditton
Party	Candidate	Votes	%	±%
Liberal Democrats	Barry Fairbank	1,019	45.8	−13.0
Conservative	Claudia Riley-Hards	1,011	45.5	+14.4
Labour	Bronte Schiltz	193	8.7	N/A
Majority				
Turnout		2,235	42.6	
Liberal Democrats hold		Swing		

=== Molesey East ===
Molesey East
Party	Candidate	Votes	%	±%
Conservative	Steve Bax	1,337	46.8	+7.5
Molesey Residents' Association	Tony Popham	1,048	36.7	−12.0
Labour	Rosie Rendall	265	9.3	−1.3
Green	Lisa Howard	183	6.4	−4.2
Monster Raving Loony	Monkey the Drummer	22	0.8	N/A
Majority				
Turnout		2,857	43.0	
Conservative gain from Residents		Swing		

=== Molesey West ===
Molesey West
Party	Candidate	Votes	%	±%
Molesey Residents' Association	Ruby Ahmed	1,043	46.5	-18.0
Conservative	Paul Wood	745	33.2	+19.3
Labour	Marc Doran	273	12.2	−1.0
Liberal Democrats	Paul Nagle	181	8.1	−0.1
Majority				
Turnout		2,247	33.4	
Residents hold		Swing		

=== Oatlands and Burwood Park ===
Oatlands and Burwood Park
Party	Candidate	Votes	%	±%
Conservative	Barry Cheyne	1,513	69.1	+0.5
Liberal Democrats	Graham Winton	370	16.9	N/A
Labour	Warren Weertman	254	11.6	−5.8
UKIP	Simon Kadwill-Kelly	51	2.3	−11.9
Majority				
Turnout		2,196	37.4	
Conservative hold		Swing		

=== Oxshott and Stoke D'Abernon ===
Oxshott and Stoke D'Abernon
Party	Candidate	Votes	%	±%
Conservative	Andrew Burley	1,755	76.7	+6.5
Liberal Democrats	Dorothy Ford	366	16.0	−1.4
Labour	Hugh Bryant	118	5.2	−5.8
UKIP	Nicholas Wood	50	2.2	−10.3
Majority				
Turnout		2,293	35.2	
Conservative hold		Swing		

=== Thames Ditton ===
Thames Ditton
Party	Candidate	Votes	%	±%
Thames Ditton / Weston Green Residents' Association	Caroline James	1,593	65.6	-5.2
Conservative	Xingang Wang	412	17.0	−3.5
Liberal Democrats	Francisca Oxley	214	8.8	−2.3
Labour	Benjamin Griffin	210	8.6	N/A
Majority				
Turnout		2,438	38.2	
Residents hold		Swing		

=== Walton Central ===
Walton Central
Party	Candidate	Votes	%	±%
Conservative	Christine Richardson	1,020	45.2	+14.9
The Walton Society	Graham Woolgar	947	41.9	−7.9
Labour	Peter Ramsbottom	292	12.9	−2.0
Majority				
Turnout		2,270	38.2	
Conservative gain from Residents		Swing		

=== Walton North ===
Walton North
Party	Candidate	Votes	%	±%
Conservative	Alan Kopitko	851	45.5	+6.9
Labour	Lana Hylands	634	33.9	+0.4
Liberal Democrats	Margaret Hawkes	256	13.7	−9.7
UKIP	David Ions	90	4.8	−22.1
Monster Raving Loony	Baron Badger	38	2.0	N/A
Majority				
Turnout		1,880	31.3	
Conservative hold		Swing		

=== Walton South ===
Walton South
Party	Candidate	Votes	%	±%
Conservative	Malcolm Howard	1,276	54.7	−5.1
Liberal Democrats	Chris Elmer	719	30.8	+6.8
Labour	Katrina Jepson	336	14.4	−12.4
Majority				
Turnout		2,344	34.9	
Conservative hold		Swing		

=== Weybridge Riverside ===
Weybridge Riverside
Party	Candidate	Votes	%	±%
Liberal Democrats	Vicki MacLeod	891	39.3	+3.3
Conservative	Andrew Muddyman	842	37.1	+0.1
Independent	Craig MacKenzie	304	13.4	−8.7
Labour	Stephanie Franklin	193	8.5	−2.7
UKIP	Timothy Pope	39	1.7	N/A
Majority				
Turnout		2,272	38.4	
Liberal Democrats hold		Swing		

=== Weybridge St George's Hill ===
Weybridge St George's Hill
Party	Candidate	Votes	%	±%
Conservative	Charu Sood	1,293	54.1	+10.8
Weybridge & St. George's Independents	Rani Bhamra	878	36.7	−0.3
Labour	Angus Rendall	219	9.2	+3.0
Majority				
Turnout		2,398	38.1	
Conservative hold		Swing		

== By-elections ==
Oxshott and Stoke D'Abernon, 12 July 2018
Party	Candidate	Votes	%	±%
Conservative	David Lewis	1,297	72.0	−4.7
Liberal Democrats	Dorothy Ford	463	25.7	+9.7
UKIP	Nicholas Wood	42	2.3	+0.1
Majority				
Turnout		1,802	27.7	
Conservative hold		Swing		
