= Bootle High School =

- Reconstructed school crest

Location
- Browns Lane; Liverpool, Merseyside, L30 5RN; England; 53°29′18″N 2°57′56″W

Information
- Type: Secondary Comprehensive
- Motto: Respice, Aspice, Prospice (Look to the past, look to the present, look to the future)
- Established: 1984
- Closed: 2009
- Local authority: Sefton
- Department for Education URN: 104957 Tables
- Ofsted: Reports
- Headteacher: P Fryer
- Gender: Coeducational
- Age: 11 to 16
- Enrolment: 825
- Former name: Bootle Grammar School
- Website: Archived

Bootle High School was located in Netherton, Merseyside, England. The school throughout its history was based across several sites, until it ultimately closed in 2009 following amalgamation with a newly built Litherland High School. The school is notable as being the first in Britain to install an Amstrad computer network which facilitated learning and communication between the school's then split sites.

== History ==
=== Countess of Derby County Secondary School ===
The Browns Lane site started as the Countess of Derby County Secondary School, with construction starting in October 1956 by W.A. Gale Ltd at a cost of £148,500. The all-girls school was officially opened by Princess Margaret on 17 March 1960. The initial intake was 360 pupils, which was expected to rise to 450. Some students transferred from Warwick Bolam County Secondary School, which then became an all-boys school as originally planned.

=== Grammar School ===
Bootle High School started as Bootle Grammar School For Boys, based at Balliol Road, Bootle (where the modern day Hugh Baird resides) until 1961, when it moved to a new site at Marian Way in Netherton.

=== Comprehensive ===
In 1973, Warwick Bolam Secondary School merged with Bootle Grammar School to become Warwick Bolam High School. The school resided on two sites until 1984 when Warwick Bolam High School merged with The Countess of Derby based at Browns Lane. The name was then changed to Bootle High School with the headmaster of Warwick Bolam High School (Mr Middleton) retaining his position of headmaster, whilst the headmaster of Countess of Derby (Mr Gratton) becoming deputy headmaster of the merged school.

In 1986, the 1,100 pupil school became notable for being the first in the country to have an Amstrad computer network installed, which began installation in 1985 and officially launched in September. The costs were shared between the school and Sefton Council. There was international interest in the system, provided by Northern Computers, with requests from countries such as Australia, New Zealand and Iceland, among others. As well as offering word processing and computing courses, it also facilitated data transfer between the school's split sites and could be used as an electronic mail system. Headteacher Peter Middleton planned to introduce computers to every student at the school with the aim for "every child to be computer literate".

For two years, the school was based on three sites until 1986, when the Glovers Lane site became surplus as the school moved its arts and crafts classes to the Marian Way site. The council opted to convert the site into a community centre, now known as the Netherton Activity Centre, which opened in summer 1987. The site had been considered as being redeveloped for housing, however this was rejected due to a poor housing market for new buyers.

The school operated across two sites until 1991, at which point the entire school moved to a single site in Browns Lane after spending over 3 million pounds on improving and extending the building. The Marian Way site, which had been vandalised, was subsequently demolished in September 1991, despite local objection.

== Ofsted inspections ==
During the 2005 Ofsted inspection, the school's overall effectiveness was judged to be satisfactory, deemed to be an improvement on previous years. Shortly before closure, the school was re-inspected by OFSTED with a determination of good.

== Litherland High School merger proposal ==
The Liverpool Echo newspaper reported in October 2006 that Sefton Council had been awarded government funding to build a new school, which would merge Bootle High School into Litherland High School, mainly due to falling intake numbers particularly at Bootle High School, with proposals for a Sixth form to be constructed on the site of Bootle High School. Objection were initially raised with regards to the closure of Bootle High School, despite indications that the DfES had approved the council's plan. 1984 – 2009

A meeting held at the Town Hall, Bootle in May 2007 indicated the project would cost approximately £22.4m, with the new higher capacity Litherland High School operating from 1 September 2009. All pupils at Bootle High School were assigned to the new Litherland High School in 2009.

== Notable former pupils ==
=== Bootle Grammar School ===
- George Davies, clothes designer and creator of George at Asda in 1990 and Next plc in 1981
- Very Rev Rudolph Henderson Howat, Diocese of Brechin from 1957 to 1964
- Graham Karran, Chief Fire Officer from 1980 to 1983 of Derbyshire Fire Service and from 1983 to 1990 of West Yorkshire Fire Service
- Gordon Redding
- Alan Simpson, Labour MP from 1992 to 2010 for Nottingham South, President of the Student Union from 1969 to 1970 of Trent Polytechnic
- Matt Simpson (poet)
- Sir Kenneth Thompson, 1st Baronet, Conservative MP from 1950 to 1964 for Liverpool Walton, and chairman from 1977 to 1981 of Merseyside County Council
- Mike Wharton, Leader of Halton Council (2021–Present), and Deputy Mayor of the Liverpool City Region (2024–Present)
