= Mike Wharton =

British politician

Cllr Mike Wharton
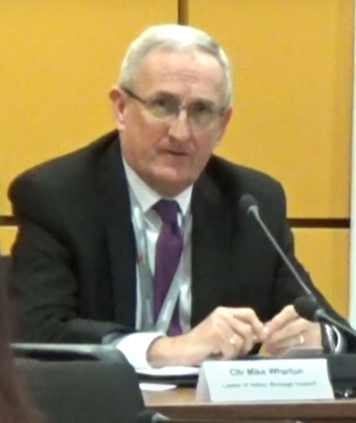
- Wharton in 2023

Deputy Mayor of the Liverpool City Region
- Incumbent
- Assumed Role; July 2024
- Mayor: Steve Rotheram
- Preceded by: David Baines

Leader of Halton Borough Council
- Incumbent
- Assumed office 11 May 2021
- Preceded by: Rob Polhill

Personal details
- Party: Labour
- Education: Bootle Grammar School

Mike Wharton is a British Labour Party politician, currently serving as the leader of Halton Borough Council and deputy mayor of the Liverpool City Region Combined Authority with the additional cabinet portfolio of Business, Investment and Trade.

== Early life and education ==
Mike Wharton grew up in Bootle, having attended Bootle Grammar School. His father was a Union shop steward in the town's docks. Wharton has worked finance for the retail company Littlewoods until 2005.

== Political career ==
Wharton was first elected to Halton Borough Council in 2002 for the ward of Hale Village. Around 2006, Wharton was given the Halton Borough Council portfolio for resources, which placed him in charge of producing the council's annual budget. Four years later, he became the deputy leader of the council. In 2021, during the COVID-19 pandemic, he was elected as the leader of the council after his predecessor, Rob Polhill, stepped down. he won re-election for his ward in 2024

In 2023 Wharton hit out at the Conservative UK Government after Halton Borough Council was forced to close a number of supporting services for children in Halton due to a lack of funding, Wharton was on record in the council meeting saying that the funding of local authorities was not a priority for the government, Wharton further went on to blame the disorder and turmoil in Downing Street and the governments record for helping councils as the reasons for this decision.

As leader of Halton Borough Council, Wharton also serves on the Liverpool City Region Combined Authority cabinet. He had been responsible for culture, tourism and the visitor economy until 2023 when he became the cabinet member for economic development and business prior to this he served as cabinet member for Culture, Tourism & The Visitor Economy. In 2024, the Mayor of the Liverpool City Region, Steve Rotheram, announced that Wharton would become deputy mayor of the city region, taking over from David Baines, the leader of St Helens Borough Council, who was elected to Parliament in the 2024 General Election and stepped down from his local government roles.

As Liverpool City Region Cabinet Member for Business, Investment and Trade, Wharton stated in 2024 that he is "Determined to accelerate inward investment and boost international trade" in the Liverpool City Region. Wharton also assisted with the creation and selection of members for the Liverpool City Region Combined Authority Business and Enterprise Board which in 2023 absorbed the powers and role of Liverpool City Region Local enterprise partnership and was made a part of the combined authority.

Wharton announced his decision to step down from the role of Council Leader for Halton Borough Council on 29 June, 2026, starting the process by which The Labour Group would select a successor.
