= 2018 St Helens Metropolitan Borough Council election =

2018 UK local government election

| ← 2016 | 3 May 2018 | 2019 → |

16 of 48 seats (One Third) to St Helens Metropolitan Borough Council 25 seats needed for a majority

| | First party | Second party |
|---|---|---|
| Leader | Derek Long | Allan Jones |
| Party | Labour | Conservative |
| Leader's seat | West Park | Rainford |
| Last election | 15 seats, 57.9% | 1 seats, 14.9% |
| Seats before | 42 | 3 |
| Seats won | 13 | 1 |
| Seats after | 41 | 3 |
| Seat change | ▼1 | Steady |
| Popular vote | 19,035 | 31,122 |
| Percentage | 49.7% | 19.9% |
| Swing | ▼8.2% | ▲5.0% |
| | Third party | Fourth party |
| Leader | Teresa Sims |
| Party | Liberal Democrats | Independent |
| Leader's seat | Eccleston |
| Last election | 1 seat, 7.7% | 0 seats, 3.3% |
| Seats before | 3 | 0 |
| Seats won | 1 | 1 |
| Seats after | 3 | 1 |
| Seat change | Steady | ▲1 |
| Popular vote | 4,128 | 2,164 |
| Percentage | 10.8% | 5.7% |
| Swing | ▲3.1% | ▲2.4% |
- Map of results of 2018 election
Leader of the Council before election
Derek Long
Labour
Leader of the Council after election
Derek Long
Labour

The 2018 St Helens Metropolitan Borough Council election took place on 3 May 2018 to elect members of St Helens Metropolitan Borough Council in England. This was on the same day as other local elections. It saw the Green Party get the biggest vote growth, However the only seat change was in Rainhill where an Independent beat Labour. Elsewhere UKIP's Vote share collapsed.

== Election results ==
=== Overall election result ===
Overall result compared with 2016.

St Helens Metropolitan Borough Council Election Results, 2018
| Party | Candidates | | | | | | Votes | | |
| Party | Stood | Elected | Gained | Unseated | Net | % of total | % | No. | Net % |
|---|---|---|---|---|---|---|---|---|---|
| Labour | 16 | 13 | 0 | 1 | ▼1 | 81.3 | 49.7 | 19,035 | ▼8.2 |
| Conservative | 16 | 1 | 0 | 0 | Steady | 6.3 | 19.9 | 7,603 | ▲5.0 |
| Liberal Democrats | 5 | 1 | 0 | 0 | Steady | 6.3 | 10.8 | 4,128 | ▲3.1 |
| Green | 11 | 0 | 0 | 0 | Steady | 0 | 10.3 | 3,946 | ▲7.6 |
| Independent | 1 | 1 | 1 | 0 | ▲1 | 6.3 | 5.7 | 2,164 | ▲2.4 |
| UKIP | 9 | 0 | 0 | 0 | Steady | 0 | 3.3 | 1,281 | ▼10.3 |
| Democrats and Veterans | 1 | 0 | 0 | 0 | Steady | 0 | 0.3 | 110 | New |

== Ward results ==
=== Billinge and Seneley Green ===
Billinge and Seneley Green
| Party | Candidate | Votes | % | ±% |
|---|---|---|---|---|
| Labour | Sue Murphy | 1,326 | 49.8 | |
| Conservative | Nancy Ashcroft | 741 | 27.8 | |
| Green | Sue Rahman | 400 | 15.0 | |
| UKIP | Peter Peers | 198 | 7.4 | |

=== Blackbrook ===
Blackbrook
| Party | Candidate | Votes | % | ±% |
|---|---|---|---|---|
| Labour | Paul McQuade | 1,293 | 61.4 | |
| Conservative | Melanie Lee | 333 | 15.8 | |
| Green | Ellen Finney | 323 | 15.3 | |
| UKIP | Susan Levy | 157 | 7.5 | |

=== Bold ===
Bold
| Party | Candidate | Votes | % | ±% |
|---|---|---|---|---|
| Labour | Lisa Preston | 1,114 | 60.0 | |
| Conservative | Barbara Woodcock | 353 | 19.0 | |
| Green | David O'Keefe | 207 | 11.1 | |
| Liberal Democrats | Marise Roberts | 184 | 9.9 | |

=== Earlestown ===
Earlestown
| Party | Candidate | Votes | % | ±% |
|---|---|---|---|---|
| Labour | Dave Banks | 1,261 | 64.6 | |
| Conservative | Wally Ashcroft | 357 | 18.3 | |
| Green | Alan Smith | 333 | 17.1 | |

=== Eccleston ===
Eccleston
| Party | Candidate | Votes | % | ±% |
|---|---|---|---|---|
| Liberal Democrats | Geoff Pearl | 2,325 | 68.6 | |
| Labour | Glyn Jones | 710 | 20.9 | |
| Conservative | Lisa Mackarell | 355 | 10.5 | |

=== Haydock ===
Haydock
| Party | Candidate | Votes | % | ±% |
|---|---|---|---|---|
| Labour | Martin Bond | 1,147 | 46.4 | ▼24.2 |
| Green | Amy Deluce | 952 | 38.5 | New |
| Conservative | Judith Collins | 374 | 15.1 | ▲4.3 |
| Majority | | 195 | 7.9 | ▼44.0 |
| Registered electors | | 9,054 | | |
| Turnout | | 2,478 | 27.4 | |
| Rejected ballots | | 5 | 0.2 | ▼0.4 |
| Labour hold | | Swing | ▼22.0 | |

=== Moss Bank ===
Moss Bank
| Party | Candidate | Votes | % | ±% |
|---|---|---|---|---|
| Labour | Trisha Long | 1,398 | 57.6 | |
| Conservative | Margaret Harvey | 608 | 25.1 | |
| Green | Deb Connor | 419 | 17.3 | |

=== Newton ===
Newton
| Party | Candidate | Votes | % | ±% |
|---|---|---|---|---|
| Labour | Jeanie Bell | 1,098 | 43.1 | |
| Liberal Democrats | David Smith | 771 | 30.2 | |
| Conservative | David Skeech | 417 | 16.4 | |
| Green | David Van Der Burg | 264 | 10.4 | |

=== Parr ===
Parr
| Party | Candidate | Votes | % | ±% |
|---|---|---|---|---|
| Labour | Kate Groucutt | 1,309 | 76.1 | |
| Conservative | Madeleine Wilcock | 165 | 9.6 | |
| UKIP | Martin Ellison | 135 | 7.9 | |
| Democrats and Veterans | Gerry McNeilly | 110 | 6.4 | |

=== Rainford ===
Rainford
| Party | Candidate | Votes | % | ±% |
|---|---|---|---|---|
| Conservative | Anne Mussell | 1,533 | 60.6 | |
| Labour | Keith Laird | 653 | 25.8 | |
| Green | Jo Travis | 305 | 12.1 | |
| UKIP | Tony Parr | 38 | 1.5 | |

=== Rainhill ===
Rainhill
| Party | Candidate | Votes | % | ±% |
|---|---|---|---|---|
| Independent | James Tasker | 2,164 | 58.0 | |
| Labour | Stephen Glover | 1229 | 33.0 | |
| Conservative | Henry Spriggs | 336 | 9.0 | |

=== Sutton ===
Sutton
| Party | Candidate | Votes | % | ±% |
|---|---|---|---|---|
| Labour | Pat Jackson | 1,235 | 55.6 | |
| Liberal Democrats | Brian Spencer | 482 | 21.7 | |
| Conservative | Allan Dockerty | 351 | 15.8 | |
| UKIP | John Fairhurst | 154 | 6.9 | |

=== Thatto Heath ===
Thatto Heath
| Party | Candidate | Votes | % | ±% |
|---|---|---|---|---|
| Labour | Richard McCauley | 1,491 | 68.6 | |
| Conservative | Anthony Rigby | 487 | 22.4 | |
| UKIP | Mark Richardson | 194 | 8.9 | |

=== Town Centre ===
Town Centre
| Party | Candidate | Votes | % | ±% |
|---|---|---|---|---|
| Labour | Michelle Sweeney | 1,233 | 68.5 | |
| Conservative | Francis Wilcock | 212 | 11.8 | |
| Green | William Fitzpatrick | 204 | 11.3 | |
| UKIP | Mark Hitchen | 150 | 8.3 | |

=== West Park ===
West Park
| Party | Candidate | Votes | % | ±% |
|---|---|---|---|---|
| Labour | Derek Long | 1,412 | 61.8 | |
| Conservative | Iris Brown | 409 | 17.9 | |
| Green | Ian Fraser | 313 | 13.7 | |
| UKIP | Ian Pennington | 149 | 6.5 | |

=== Windle ===
Windle
| Party | Candidate | Votes | % | ±% |
|---|---|---|---|---|
| Labour | Mancyia Uddin | 1,126 | 46.6 | |
| Conservative | John Cunliffe | 592 | 24.5 | |
| Liberal Democrats | Carol Pearl | 366 | 15.1 | |
| Green | Francis Williams | 226 | 9.4 | |
| UKIP | Maria Parr | 106 | 4.4 | |
