= 2026 Halton Borough Council election =

Local election in Cheshire, England

- 7 May 2026

19 out of 54 seats to Halton Borough Council (including 1 by-election) 28 seats needed for a majority
	First party	Second party	Third party
Leader	Jonathan Mackie	Mike Wharton	Margaret Ratcliffe
Party	Reform	Labour	Liberal Democrats
Last election	0 seats, 1.0%	50 seats, 68.1%	3 seats, 10.4%
Seats before	1 (Note: The incumbent Conservative councillor at the time of the 2024 local elections, Sian Davidson, defected to Reform UK in May 2025. She then ran in a different ward for the 2026 local elections.)	47	3
Seats won	16	2	1
Seats after	16	32	3
Seat change	▲15	▼15	Steady
Popular vote	14,721	10,884	1,948
Percentage	48.6%	35.9%	6.4%
Swing	▲47.6%	▼32.2%	▼4.0%
	Fourth party	Fifth party
Party	Independent	Conservative
Last election	0 seats, 1.7%	1 seats, 11.6%
Seats before	3 (Note: Three councillors resigned from the Labour Party in 2026 prior to the local elections and sit as independents. None of these seats were up for election in 2026.)	0
Seats won	0	0
Seats after	3	0
Seat change	Steady	Steady
Popular vote	564	2,091
Percentage	1.9%	6.9%
Swing	▲0.2%	▼4.7%
- Results by ward
Leader before election
Mike Wharton
Labour
Leader after election
Mike Wharton
Labour

The 2026 Halton Borough Council election was held on 7 May 2026, alongside the other local elections across the United Kingdom being held on the same day, to elect 19 of 54 members of Halton Borough Council.

The council remained under Labour control, but their majority was significantly reduced. Reform UK, which only held one seat on the council prior to the election, won 16 of the 19 seats contested.

== Summary ==
=== Background ===
The Borough of Halton is split into 18 wards, each returning three councillors. One councillor for each ward is elected each year over three years. A fourth year, in which no elections are held, is known as a 'fallow year'.

In the 2024 local elections (2025 being a fallow year) Labour retained control of the council with a total of 50 out of 54 seats. Three of these councillors resigned from the Labour Party in early 2026 to sit as independents. None of these three seats were up for election in 2026. The council's sole Conservative councillor, Sian Davidson, defected to Reform UK in May 2025. She represented Daresbury, Moore & Sandymoor but ran in the Mersey ward for the 2026 local elections. Also in the Daresbury, Moore & Sandymoor ward, an incumbent Labour councillor who would not otherwise have been up for election stood down from the council and necessitated a by-election. Therefore, two council seats were up for election in Daresbury, Moore & Sandymoor, making a total of 19 seats up for election across the borough. Labour did not run a candidate against the incumbent Liberal Democrat councillor for the Beechwood & Heath ward in a move that was seen as tactical.

=== Election result ===
Of the 19 seats up for election, Reform UK gained 15 from Labour and retained 1, whilst Labour held 2 seats and the Liberal Democrats held 1. Labour won in Farnworth by a margin of just one vote, whilst Reform won in Birchfield by only two votes.

2026 Halton Borough Council election
Party	This election				Full council			This election		
Party	Candidates	Seats	Net	Seats %	Other	Total	Total %	Votes	Votes %	+/−
Labour	18	2	▼15	10.5%	30	32	59.3%			
Liberal Democrats	5	1	Steady	5.3%	2	3	5.6%			
Reform	19	16	▲15	84.2%	0	16	29.6%			
Independent	4	0	Steady	0%	3	3	5.6%			
Conservative	15	0	Steady	0%	0	0	0%			
Green	19	0	Steady	0%	0	0	0%			
Libertarian	1	0	Steady	0%	0	0	0%			

== Incumbents ==
Ward	Incumbent councillor	Party	Re-standing
Appleton	Angela Teeling	Labour	Yes
Bankfield	Laura Bevan	Labour	Yes
Beechwood & Heath	Gareth Stockton	Liberal Democrats	Yes
Birchfield	Mike Fry	Labour	Yes
Bridgewater	Emma Garner	Labour	No
Central & West Bank	Noel Hutchinson	Labour	No
Daresbury, Moore & Sandymoor	Sian Davidson	Reform	Yes
Ditton, Hale Village & Halebank	Marie Wright	Labour	Yes
Farnworth	Valerie Hill	Labour	No
Grange	Mark Dennett	Labour	No
Halton Castle	Chris Carlin	Labour	Yes
Halton Lea	Alan Lowe	Labour	No
Halton View	Louise Nolan	Labour	Yes
Highfield	Robert Gilligan	Labour	Yes
Hough Green	Phil Harris	Labour	Yes
Mersey & Weston	Norman Plumpton-Walsh	Labour	Yes
Norton North	Geoffrey Logan	Labour	No
Norton South & Preston Brook	Martha Lloyd-Jones	Labour	Yes

== Ward results ==
=== Appleton ===
Appleton
Party	Candidate	Votes	%	±%
Reform	Paul Musker	690	42.2	N/A
Labour	Angela Teeling*	606	37.1	−47.5
Green	Sue Robinson	244	14.9	N/A
Conservative	Elaine Dean	95	5.8	−9.6
Majority		84	5.1	
Turnout		1,635		
Registered electors				
Reform gain from Labour		Swing		

=== Bankfield ===
Bankfield
Party	Candidate	Votes	%	±%
Reform	Claire Aberdeen	682	42.4	N/A
Labour	Laura Bevan*	623	38.7	−48.1
Green	Nicholas Ray	201	12.5	N/A
Conservative	Susan Forder	104	6.5	+1.3
Majority		59	3.7	
Turnout		1,610		
Registered electors				
Reform gain from Labour		Swing		

=== Beechwood & Heath ===
Beechwood & Heath
Party	Candidate	Votes	%	±%
Liberal Democrats	Gareth Stockton*	1,201	44.7	−3.2
Reform	David Roberts	1,063	39.5	N/A
Green	Julian Gardiner	356	13.2	N/A
Libertarian	Dan Clarke	69	2.6	N/A
Majority		138	5.2	
Turnout		2,689		
Registered electors				
Liberal Democrats hold		Swing		

=== Birchfield ===
Birchfield
Party	Candidate	Votes	%	±%
Reform	James Coopersmith	837	35.6	N/A
Labour	Mike Fry*	835	35.5	−26.1
Green	Joseph Scholes	340	14.5	N/A
Conservative	John Powell	339	14.4	−13.5
Majority		2	0.1	
Turnout		2,351		
Registered electors				
Reform gain from Labour		Swing		

=== Bridgewater ===
Bridgewater
Party	Candidate	Votes	%	±%
Reform	Sarah Davies	876	45.2	N/A
Labour	Mark Dennett	561	28.9	−45.7
Green	Deborah Brooks	348	17.9	N/A
Liberal Democrats	Suzanne Howard	90	4.6	−6.1
Conservative	Matthew Quinn	64	3.3	−11.4
Majority		315	16.3	
Turnout		1,939		
Registered electors				
Reform gain from Labour		Swing		

=== Central & West Bank ===
Central & West Bank
Party	Candidate	Votes	%	±%
Reform	Jonathan Mackie	662	51.5	N/A
Labour	Ian Wall	369	28.7	−57.0
Green	Aubrey Kelly	209	16.3	N/A
Conservative	Julie Powell	45	3.5	−10.8
Majority		297	22.8	
Turnout		1,285		
Registered electors				
Reform gain from Labour		Swing		

=== Daresbury, Moore & Sandymoor ===
Daresbury, Moore & Sandymoor (2 seats due to by-election)
Party	Candidate	Votes	%	±%
Reform	John Scott	728	36.7	
Reform	Dylan Eaton	725		
Labour	Jo Jones	664	32.1	
Labour	Geoffrey Logan	609		
Green	Christopher Biggs	353	16.9	
Green	Robert McClennan	318		
Conservative	Sara Wakefield	317	8.0	
Liberal Democrats	John Secker	249	6.3	
Majority				
Turnout				
Registered electors				
Reform gain from Labour		Swing		
Reform hold		Swing		

=== Ditton, Hale Village & Halebank ===
Ditton, Hale Village & Halebank
Party	Candidate	Votes	%	±%
Reform	John Anderton	923	53.0	N/A
Labour	Marie Wright*	510	29.3	−50.9
Green	Niamh Richards	220	12.6	N/A
Conservative	Ksawier Staniszewski	89	5.1	−14.7
Majority		413	23.7	
Turnout		1742	33.9	
Registered electors		5137		
Reform gain from Labour				

=== Farnworth ===
Farnworth
Party	Candidate	Votes	%	±%
Labour	Luke Williams	837	36.5	−37.8
Reform	Frank Simpson	836	36.4	N/A
Green	Helen McGauley	315	13.7	N/A
Conservative	Philip Harper	308	13.4	−12.3
Majority		1	0.1	−29.5
Turnout		2,296		
Registered electors				
Labour hold		Swing		

=== Grange ===
Grange
Party	Candidate	Votes	%	±%
Reform	Gary Oates	695	40.5	N/A
Labour	Frances Stewart	498	29.0	−38.8
Green	Michael O'Day	277	16.1	N/A
Independent	Wolfie Smith	168	9.8	
Independent	Daniel Baker	79	4.6	
Majority		197	11.5	
Turnout		1,717		
Registered electors				
Reform gain from Labour		Swing		

=== Halton Castle ===
Halton Castle
Party	Candidate	Votes	%	±%
Reform	John Davies	594	39.9	N/A
Labour	Chris Carlin*	510	34.2	−28.8
Green	Iain Ferguson	248	16.6	−0.8
Independent	Darrin Whyte	138	9.3	−2.5
Majority		84	5.7	
Turnout		1,490		
Registered electors				
Reform gain from Labour		Swing		

=== Halton Lea ===
Halton Lea
Party	Candidate	Votes	%	±%
Reform	Jack Raftree	695	45.4	N/A
Labour	Nia Hayes	492	32.1	−46.4
Green	Joshua Bell	286	18.7	+11.0
Conservative	Luke Hanson	59	3.9	−7.7
Majority		203	13.3	
Turnout		1,532		
Registered electors				
Reform gain from Labour		Swing		

=== Halton View ===
Halton View
Party	Candidate	Votes	%	±%
Reform	Damian Curzon	898	47.8	N/A
Labour	Louise Nolan*	619	33.0	−47.1
Green	Josh Watson	243	12.9	N/A
Conservative	James Powell	118	6.3	−13.6
Majority		279	14.8	
Turnout				
Registered electors				
Reform gain from Labour		Swing		

=== Highfield ===
Highfield
Party	Candidate	Votes	%	±%
Labour	Bob Gilligan*	816		
Reform	Dave O'Connor	809		
Green	Kiel Oldfield	226		
Conservative	Pamela McDermott	112		
Majority				
Turnout				
Registered electors				
Labour hold		Swing		

=== Hough Green ===
Hough Green
Party	Candidate	Votes	%	±%
Reform	Thomas Atherton	760	43.0	
Labour	Phil Harris*	688	38.9	
Green	Nicholas Parry	217	12.3	
Conservative	Raymond Roberts	103	5.8	
Majority		72	4.1	
Turnout		1768	33.5	
Registered electors		5280		
Reform gain from Labour				

=== Mersey & Weston ===
Mersey & Weston
Party	Candidate	Votes	%	±%
Reform	Siân Davidson*	784		
Labour	Norman Plumpton-Walsh*	567		
Green	Hayley Smith	327		
Independent	John Lunt	179		
Liberal Democrats	Joanne Rowe	154		
Conservative	Colleen Harper	74		
Majority				
Turnout				
Registered electors				
Reform gain from Labour		Swing		

=== Norton North ===
Norton North
Party	Candidate	Votes	%	±%
Reform	William Davies	846		
Labour	Nathan Fitzpatrick	595		
Green	Lauren Hickton	280		
Liberal Democrats	Diane Inch	254		
Conservative	Mary Hanson	145		
Majority				
Turnout				
Registered electors				
Reform gain from Labour		Swing		

=== Norton South & Preston Brook ===
Norton South & Preston Brook
Party	Candidate	Votes	%	±%
Reform	Peter Davidson	618	41.6	
Labour	Martha Lloyd-Jones*	485	32.6	
Green	Emma Brown	264	17.8	
Conservative	Adam Burnett	119	8.0	
Majority		133	9.0	
Turnout		1486	30.2	
Registered electors		4915		
Reform gain from Labour				

== Post-election changes ==
=== Beechwood & Heath by-election ===
Beechwood & Heath by-election: 29 October 2026
Party	Candidate	Votes	%	±%
Reform	Neil Thornton	750	35.3	−4.2
Liberal Democrats	Diane Inch	559	26.3	−18.4
Labour	Owen Ashworth	535	25.2	N/A
Restore	Ash Corcoran	134	6.3	N/A
Independent	Dan Clarke	90	4.2	N/A
Conservative	Luke Hanson	56	2.6	N/A
Majority		191	9.0	N/A
Turnout		2,124	35.1	−9.4
Reform gain from Liberal Democrats		Swing	+7.1	
