= 2019 St Helens Metropolitan Borough Council election =

2019 UK local government election

- 2 May 2019

16 of 48 seats (One Third) to St Helens Metropolitan Borough Council 25 seats needed for a majority

	First party	Second party
Leader	Derek Long	Allan Jones
Party	Labour	Conservative
Leader's seat	West Park	Rainford
Last election	15 seats, 57.9%	1 seats, 14.9%
Seats before	41	3
Seats won	10	1
Seats after	37	3
Seat change	▼4	Steady
Popular vote	14,276	5,552
Swing	▼	▲
	Third party	Fourth party
Leader	Teresa Sims
Party	Liberal Democrats	Independent
Leader's seat	Eccleston
Last election	1 seat, 7.7%	0 seats, 3.3%
Seats before	3	1
Seats won	2	1
Seats after	4	2
Seat change	▲1	▲1
Popular vote	5,623	2,753
Swing	▲	▲
- Map of results of 2019 election
Leader of the Council before election
Derek Long
Labour
Leader of the Council after election
Derek Long
Labour

The 2019 St Helens Metropolitan Borough Council election took place on 2 May 2019 to elect members of St Helens Metropolitan Borough Council in England. This was on the same day as other local elections. With one third of the seats on the council up for election Labour lost control of four seats although Labour retained overall control of the council. The losses were Bold and Haydock to the Green Party, Newton-Le-Willows to the Liberal Democrats and Rainhill to an Independent candidate.

== Election results ==
=== Overall election result ===
Overall result compared with 2018.

St Helens Metropolitan Borough Council Election Results, 2019
Party	Candidates						Votes		
Party	Stood	Elected	Gained	Unseated	Net	% of total	%	No.	Net %
Labour	16	10	0	4	▼4		36.4	14,276	▼
Green	14	2	2	0	▲2		24.6	9,651	▲
Liberal Democrats	6	2	1	0	▲1		14.3	5,623	▲
Conservative	16	1	0	0	Steady		14.2	5,552	▲
Independent	1	1	1	0	▲1		7.0	2,753	▲
UKIP	3	0	0	0	Steady		3.5	1,356	▼

== Ward results ==
=== Billinge and Seneley Green ===
Billinge and Seneley Green
Party	Candidate	Votes	%	±%
Labour	Joe Pearson	1,005	36.64	▼13.2
Green	Sue Rahman	696	27.26	▲12.2
UKIP	Peter Peers	603	21.98	▲14.5
Conservative	John Charles Barlow	439	16.0	▼11.8

=== Blackbrook ===
Blackbrook
Party	Candidate	Votes	%	±%
Labour	Linda Lovina Maloney	940	46.44	▼15
Green	Ellen Finney	833	41.16	▲26.3
Conservative	Melanie Lee	251	12.40	▼3.4

=== Bold ===
Bold
Party	Candidate	Votes	%	±%
Green	David O'Keefe	833	34.9	▲23.8
Liberal Democrats	Brian Thomas Spencer	741	31.0	▲21.1
Labour	Mark Antony Hattersley	626	26.2	▼33.8
Conservative	Barbara Woodcock	189	7.9	▼11.1

=== Earlestown ===
Earlestown
Party	Candidate	Votes	%	±%
Labour	Pam Howard	993	48.8	▼15.8
Green	Alan Smith	748	36.76	▲19.6
Conservative	Nancy Jane Ashcroft	294	14.45	▼3.9

=== Eccleston ===
Eccleston
Party	Candidate	Votes	%	±%
Liberal Democrats	Michael Haw	2,694	76.47	▲7.8
Labour	Alex Graham	571	16.21	▼4.7
Conservative	Lisa Cunliffe	258	7.32	▼3.2

=== Haydock ===
Haydock
Party	Candidate	Votes	%	±%
Green	David Ian Van Der Burg	1,791	65.1	▲26.6
Labour	Jeanette Susan Banks	788	28.64	▼17.8
Conservative	Judith Collins	172	6.25	▼8.9

=== Moss Bank ===
Moss Bank
Party	Candidate	Votes	%	±%
Labour	John Fulham	982	40.51	▼17.1
UKIP	Anthony James Parr	401	16.54	NEW
Liberal Democrats	David Kent	335	13.82	NEW
Green	Deborah Peck	294	12.13	▼5.2
Conservative	Margaret Harvey	264	10.89	▼14.3
Independent	Paul John Wilcock	148	6.11	NEW

=== Newton ===
Newton
Party	Candidate	Votes	%	±%
Liberal Democrats	David Smith	1,173	41.89	▲11.6
Labour	Fiona Patricia Ruddy	890	31.79	▼11.4
Green	Piotr Pietrzak	516	18.43	▲8.0
Conservative	Allan Albert Dockerty	221	7.89	▼8.6

=== Parr ===
Parr
Party	Candidate	Votes	%	±%
Labour	Bisi Osundeko	919	58.95	▼17.2
Green	Tom Armstrong	483	30.98	NEW
Conservative	Madeleine Wilcock	157	10.07	▲0.4

=== Rainford ===
Rainford
Party	Candidate	Votes	%	±%
Conservative	James Allan Jones	1,501	59.78	▼0.9
Green	Jo Travis	573	22.82	▲10.7
Labour	Keith Laird	437	17.40	▼8.4

=== Rainhill ===
Rainhill
Party	Candidate	Votes	%	±%
Independent	Donna Marie Greaves	2,352	72.58	▲14.5
Labour	Joe De Asha	1098	23.09	▼10
Conservative	Henry Spriggs	206	4.33	▼4.7

=== Sutton ===
Sutton
Party	Candidate	Votes	%	±%
Labour	Janet Elizabeth Johnson	867	39.99	▼15.7
Green	Ian Paul Fraser	595	27.44	NEW
Liberal Democrats	Frederick Barrett	401	18.50	▼3.2
Conservative	Wally Ashcroft	305	14.07	▼1.8

=== Thatto Heath ===
Thatto Heath
Party	Candidate	Votes	%	±%
Labour	Robyn Olivia Hattersley	1,221	55.70	▼12.9
Green	Terence Price	628	28.65	NEW
Conservative	Anthony Rigby	343	15.65	▼6.8

=== Town Centre ===
Town Centre
Party	Candidate	Votes	%	±%
Labour	Carole-Ann Gill	916	52.70	▼15.8
Green	William Fitzpatrick	597	34.35	▲23
Conservative	Iris Brown	225	12.95	▲1.1

=== West Park ===
West Park
Party	Candidate	Votes	%	±%
Labour	Marlene Mary Quinn	1,189	54.05	▼7.8
Green	Jessica Northey	660	30.00	▲16.3
Conservative	Richard William Barton	351	15.95	▼2

=== Windle ===
Windle
Party	Candidate	Votes	%	±%
Labour	David Edward Baines	834	37.15	▼9.5
Green	Francis Williams	404	18.00	▲8.6
Conservative	John Cunliffe	376	16.75	▼7.8
UKIP	Maria Parr	352	15.68	▲11.2
Liberal Democrats	Carol Pearl	279	12.43	▼2.7
