= 2021 Liverpool City Region mayoral election =

Part of the 2020 UK local elections

- 6 May 2021
- Turnout: 29.7% (▲3.6%)
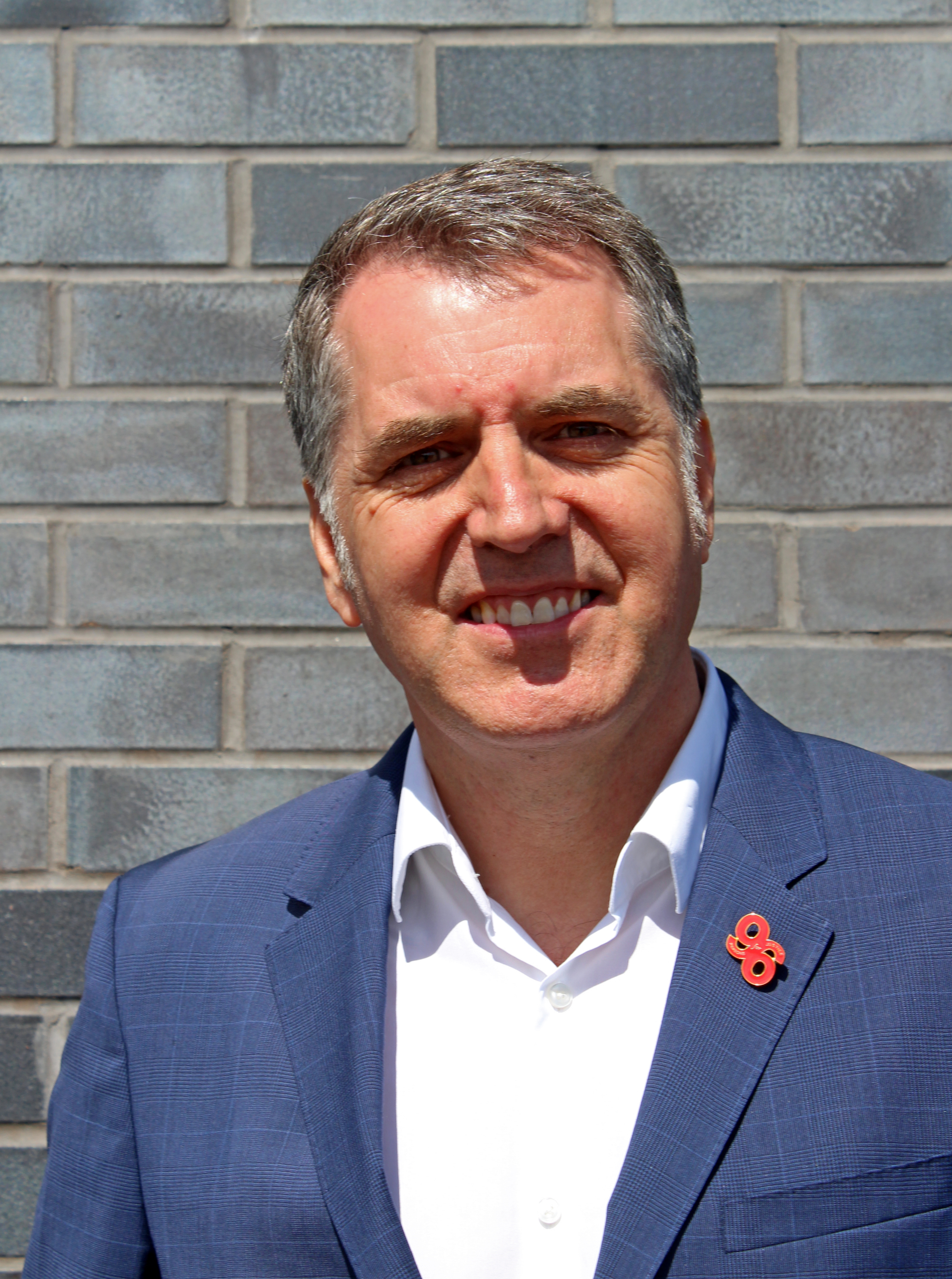

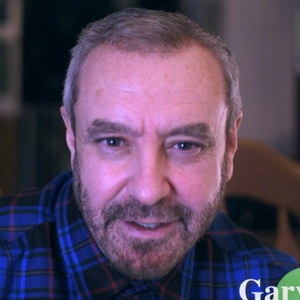
	First party	Second party
Candidate	Steve Rotheram	Jade Marsden
Party	Labour	Conservative
Popular vote	198,726	66,702
Percentage	58.3%	19.6%
Swing	▼1.0%	▼0.8%
	Third party	Fourth party
Candidate	Gary Cargill	David Newman
Party	Green	Liberal Democrats
Popular vote	40,211	35,049
Percentage	11.8%	10.3%
Swing	▲6.9%	▲3.5%
- Election result by council areas
Mayor before election
Steve Rotheram
Labour
Elected Mayor
Steve Rotherham
Labour

The 2021 Liverpool City Region mayoral election was held in May 2021 to elect the mayor of the Liverpool City Region, alongside other local elections across England and Wales, to elect councillors, the mayor of Liverpool, and police and crime commissioners across the city region. The election was originally due to take place in May 2020, but was postponed due to the COVID-19 pandemic.

== Background ==
The position of Mayor of the Liverpool City Region was created in 2017 following a devolution deal between the UK government and the Liverpool City Region Combined Authority (LCRCA). The Cities and Local Government Devolution Act 2016 required a directly elected metro mayor for combined authorities to receive additional powers from central government. Under the terms of the devolution deal, the first mayoral term was set to last until 2020, followed by elections every four years. The Liverpool City Region is defined as having six boroughs which includes the county of Merseyside (Knowsley, Liverpool, St Helens, Sefton, and Wirral) and the Borough of Halton.

In March 2019, Rotheram requested that the police and crime commissioner role for the Merseyside Police be incorporated into the role of the mayor of the Liverpool City Region. The request is in line with the powers the Greater Manchester and London mayors, who have authority and oversight over Greater Manchester Police and the Metropolitan Police Service, respectively. This was supported by the leader of Knowsley Borough Council. This would require the expansion of Merseyside Police to cover the Borough of Halton, which is in the boundaries of Cheshire Constabulary. However, this did not happen.

== Candidates ==
=== Conservative Party ===
Jade Marsden was selected as candidate for the Conservative Party. Marsden was previously the parliamentary candidate for both the Bootle and Sefton Central constituencies.

=== Labour Party ===
The incumbent mayor, Steve Rotheram, was reselected as candidate for the Labour Party in August 2019 after receiving enough support from local Constituency Labour Parties.

In January 2020, before the COVID-19 pandemic affected the United Kingdom, mayor Rotheram made it a core pledge of his re-election campaign that he would "guarantee a job, training or an apprenticeship opportunity to every young person within six months of them becoming unemployed".

=== Liberal Democrats ===
Andy Corkhill, councillor for Oxton, Wirral was originally selected as the Liberal Democrat candidate, but later withdrew because of health reasons so David Newman was selected to stand as the Lib Dem candidate. Andy Corkhill died in October 2021. Newman lives in Southport and stood in Liverpool Walton at the 2019 general election.

=== Green Party ===
The Green Party candidate for Metro Mayor is Gary Cargill, an actor who has appeared in several hit TV programmes and Hollywood films.

== Results ==
Liverpool City Region Mayor 6 May 2021
Party	Candidate	1st round		2nd round			1st round votesTransfer votes, 2nd round
Party	Candidate	Total	Of round	Transfers	Total	Of round	1st round votesTransfer votes, 2nd round
Labour	Steven Rotheram	198,736	58.33%				
Conservative	Jade Marsden	66,702	19.58%				
Green	Gary Cargill	40,211	11.80%				
Liberal Democrats	David Newman	35,049	10.29%				
Turnout		340,698	29.7%				
Labour hold							

== Results by Local Authority ==
=== Halton ===
Liverpool City Region Mayoral Election 2021, Halton
Party	Candidate	1st round		2nd round			1st round votesTransfer votes, 2nd round
Party	Candidate	Total	Of round	Transfers	Total	Of round	1st round votesTransfer votes, 2nd round
Labour	Steven Rotheram	12,642	55.57%				
Conservative	Jade Marsden	5,529	24.31%				
Green	Gary Cargill	3,129	13.76%				
Liberal Democrats	David Newman	1,448	6.37%				

=== Knowsley ===
Liverpool City Region Mayoral Election 2021, Knowsley
Party	Candidate	1st round		2nd round			1st round votesTransfer votes, 2nd round
Party	Candidate	Total	Of round	Transfers	Total	Of round	1st round votesTransfer votes, 2nd round
Labour	Steven Rotheram	19,504	68.19%				
Green	Gary Cargill	4,467	15.62%				
Conservative	Jade Marsden	2,861	10.00%				
Liberal Democrats	David Newman	1,770	6.19%				

=== Liverpool ===
Liverpool City Region Mayoral Election 2021, Liverpool
Party	Candidate	1st round		2nd round			1st round votesTransfer votes, 2nd round
Party	Candidate	Total	Of round	Transfers	Total	Of round	1st round votesTransfer votes, 2nd round
Labour	Steven Rotheram	65,955	65.85%				
Liberal Democrats	David Newman	15,577	15.55%				
Green	Gary Cargill	11,459	11.44%				
Conservative	Jade Marsden	7,176	7.16%				

=== Sefton ===
Liverpool City Region Mayoral Election 2021, Sefton
Party	Candidate	1st round		2nd round			1st round votesTransfer votes, 2nd round
Party	Candidate	Total	Of round	Transfers	Total	Of round	1st round votesTransfer votes, 2nd round
Labour	Steven Rotheram	36,967	55.01%				
Conservative	Jade Marsden	16,920	25.18%				
Liberal Democrats	David Newman	7,938	11.81%				
Green	Gary Cargill	5,379	8.00%				

=== St Helens ===
Liverpool City Region Mayoral Election 2021, St Helens
Party	Candidate	1st round		2nd round			1st round votesTransfer votes, 2nd round
Party	Candidate	Total	Of round	Transfers	Total	Of round	1st round votesTransfer votes, 2nd round
Labour	Steven Rotheram	19,622	51.95%				
Conservative	Jade Marsden	9,402	24.89%				
Green	Gary Cargill	5,997	15.88%				
Liberal Democrats	David Newman	2,749	7.28%				

=== Wirral ===
Liverpool City Region Mayoral Election 2021, Wirral
Party	Candidate	1st round		2nd round			1st round votesTransfer votes, 2nd round
Party	Candidate	Total	Of round	Transfers	Total	Of round	1st round votesTransfer votes, 2nd round
Labour	Steven Rotheram	44,046	52.31%				
Conservative	Jade Marsden	24,814	29.47%				
Green	Gary Cargill	9,780	11.61%				
Liberal Democrats	David Newman	5,567	6.61%				

== See also ==
- 2021 Liverpool City Council election
- 2021 Mayor of Liverpool election
- 2021 Merseyside police and crime commissioner election
- 2021 Wirral Metropolitan Borough Council election
