= Head North =

2024 book by Andy Burnham and Steve Rotheram

Head North: A Rallying Cry for a More Equal Britain
- Authors: Andy Burnham and Steve Rotheram
- Audio read by: Andy Burnham, Steve Rotheram and Liam Thorp
- Language: English
- Genres: Nonfiction; Politics; Economics; Autobiography; London; British literature
- Publisher: Trapeze
- Publication date: 7 March 2024
- Pages: 272
- ISBN: 978-1-398-71974-3

Head North: A Rallying Cry for a More Equal Britain is a 2024 book by then-Mayor of Greater Manchester and now Prime Minister of the United Kingdom Andy Burnham and Mayor of Liverpool Steve Rotheram. Liverpool Echo political editor Liam Thorp is a ghostwriter for the book. The book has been called a "manifesto". Burnham and Rotheram write about proposals to bridge the divide between the north and south of England.

== Content ==
Head North contains criticisms of former Prime Minister Margaret Thatcher's policies, Burnham and Rotheram also write about their distrust of Westminster and their political experiences shaped by their closeness to the Hillsborough disaster. The book outlines Burnham and Rotheram's vision for improving the National Health Service (NHS), a restructured education system, a reworked levelling up policy, a green energy transition, abolition of the House of Lords and more social housing. The book says that the House of Lords should be replaced with an elected "Senate of Regions and Nations". The book suggests other constitutional reforms such as the introduction of a German-style "basic law" that would guarantee a fair distribution of funding for regions of the United Kingdom, an overhaul of the voting system, a written constitution and the empowerment of regional leaders to shape fiscal policy. The book also criticises the governments of Tony Blair and Gordon Brown for not building a country that works for everyone. The book proposes parliamentary reforms such as removal of the whipping system to empower MPs to truly represent their constituencies. The book also highlights perceived inadequacies of the Barnett Formula which dictates funding arrangements for regions in the United Kingdom.

== Reception ==
Writing for The Guardian, Ben Myers said the book "ultimately offers hope to the northern regions when it is most needed, and reminds us that those politicians who refuse to toe the party line are often those who history remembers most favourably."

Ian Martin of UnHerd wrote "In the end, Head North is a harmless anthology of sensible ideas, larded with chippy biographical detail; what irritates is the way everything is suffused with Northern exceptionalism."

Writing for the New Statesman, Jonny Ball said of the book "Though personal tales reminiscent of Monty Python's Yorkshiremen are combined with some decent, on-trend policy proposals, these will already be familiar to the kind of person who reads non-fiction titles written by regional politicians." Ball felt that it was a conflict of interest that the book was ghostwritten by Liam Thorp, political editor of the Liverpool Echo, "the most senior local journalist tasked with holding [Rotheram] to account", who Ball felt was "painting flawed local leaders in overly positive hues".
