= Matt Simpson (poet) =

English poet and critic

Matt Simpson (13 May 1936 – 8 June 2009) was an English poet and literary critic. He published six full poetry collections, and after retiring from a senior lectureship in English at Liverpool Hope University, wrote numerous books of literary criticism.

== Life ==
Simpson was born in Bootle, Merseyside, to a working-class family with a long seafaring tradition, and educated at Bootle Grammar School. In 1955 he won a place at Cambridge, where he read English. For some years after graduating he taught English to overseas students in Cambridge, where he met his German wife, Monika Weydert, and where his two children were born. In 1964 he returned to Liverpool. During 1994, he was poet-in-residence for six months in Tasmania, and in 1996 a festschrift edited by Angela Topping was put together to celebrate his 60th birthday, with contributors such as U. A. Fanthorpe, Deryn Rees-Jones, Roger McGough, Adrian Henri and John Lucas. He was a founder member and chair of the Windows Project for many years. He was also a noted children's poet, publishing two collections and appearing in hundreds of anthologies.

Simpson died in Merseyside in June 2009, of complications following a heart bypass.

== Publications ==
=== Solo poetry collections ===
- Letters to Berlin, Driftwood Publications, 1971.
- A Skye Sequence, Driftwood Publications, 1972.
- Watercolour from an Approved School, Toulouse Press, 1975.
- Uneasy Vespers, Windows, 1977.
- Making Arrangements, Bloodaxe, 1982.
- See You on the Christmas Tree, Windows, 1984.
- Dead Baiting, Four Eyes Press, 1989.
- An Elegy for the Galosherman: New & Selected Poems, Bloodaxe, 1990.
- To Tasmania With Mrs Meredith, Headland, 1994.
- On The Right Side of the Earth, Queen Victoria Museum and Art Gallery, Australia, 1995.
- Catching Up With History, Bloodaxe, 1995.
- Somewhere Down The Line, Shoestring Press, 1998.
- Cutting The Clouds Towards, Liverpool University Press, 1998.
- Getting There, Liverpool University Press, 2001.
- In Deep, Shoestring Press, 2006.
- Walking a Friend's dog,

=== Critical works ===
- Hugging the Shore: collected essays (Collected literary essays), Shoestring Press, 2003.
- Guides to Shakespeare for Greenwich Exchange:
  - Othello (2003)
  - Macbeth (2003)
  - The Tempest (2004)
  - A Midsummer Night's Dream (2006)
  - Twelfth Night (2006)
  - Much Ado About Nothing (2007)
  - Romeo and Juliet (2008)
- Focus Guides for Greenwich Exchange:
  - The Waste Land (2007)
  - Wuthering Heights (2007)
  - Songs of Innocence and Experience (2008)
  - Portrait of the Artist as a Young Man (2008)

=== Poetry for children ===
- The Pigs' Thermal Underwear (Headland, 1993)
- What the Wind Said! (Greenwich Exchange, 2008)

=== Editor ===
- Stoneland Harvest: new and selected poems of Dimitris Tsaloumas (co-edited with John Lucas) Shoestring Press, 1999
- The Way You Say The World: a celebration for Anne Stevenson (co-edited with John Lucas), Shoestring Press, 2003
