= Liverpool City Region Combined Authority =

Strategic authority and combined authority in England

Liverpool City Region Combined Authority Halton, Knowsley, Liverpool, St Helens, Sefton and Wirral Combined Authority

Type
- Type: Combined authority of the Liverpool City Region

History
- Founded: 1 April 2014
- Preceded by: Merseyside Integrated Transport Authority

Leadership
- Mayor: Steve Rotheram, Labour since 8 May 2017
- Chief Executive: Katherine Fairclough since 28 June 2021
- Deputy Mayor: Mike Wharton, Labour

Structure
- Seats: 7 members
- Graph of the party split among 7 seats.
- Political groups: Labour (6) Reform (1)
- Committees: Committees of the LCRCA

Elections
- Voting system: Indirect election, directly elected mayor from 2017
- Last election: 2 May 2024
- Next election: 4 May 2028

Meeting place
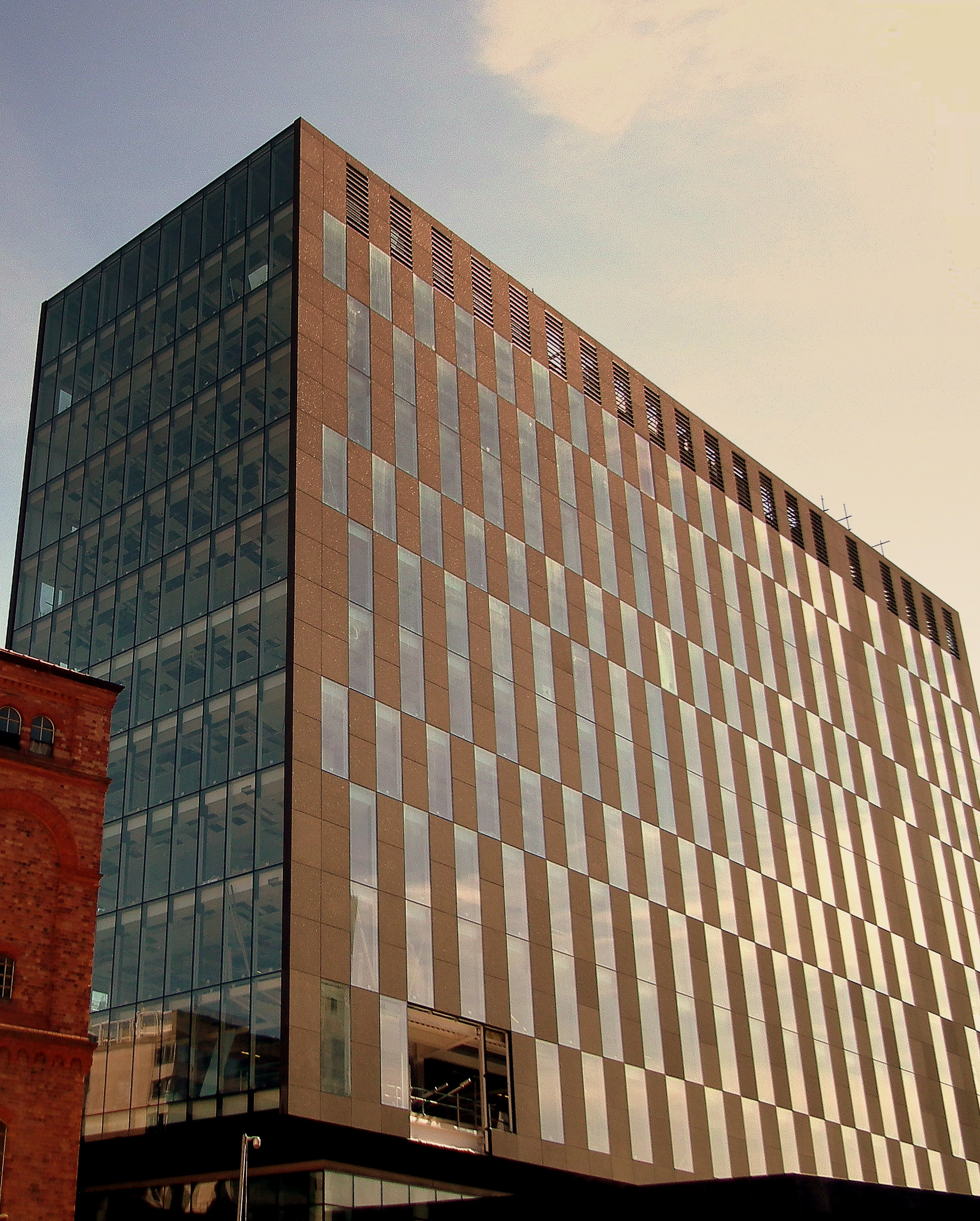
- 1 Mann Island, Liverpool, L3 1BP

Website
- www.liverpoolcityregion-ca.gov.uk

The Liverpool City Region Combined Authority (LCRCA) (Note: Legally the Halton, Knowsley, Liverpool, St Helens, Sefton and Wirral Combined Authority) is the strategic authority for the Liverpool City Region, which comprises the five metropolitan boroughs of the county of Merseyside and the borough of Halton from the county of Cheshire, England. It was established on 1 April 2014 and has since acquired powers and responsibilities over the region's transport, economic development and regeneration, culture and tourism, energy, justice, and health. Bodies such as Merseytravel are responsible for delivery of these services and report to the combined authority.

The combined authority has nine members. The Mayor of the Liverpool City Region leads the authority and is a voting member. Each of the six councils within the city region appoints a voting member, and the Merseyside Police and Crime Commissioner and the chair of the Liverpool City Region Business and Enterprise Board are non-voting members.

== History ==
=== Development and formation ===
The concept of a 'Liverpool city region' gained traction in the 2004 report 'Moving Forward: The Northern Way', commissioned by the UK government and published by The Northern Way.

Collaborative working between the local authorities in the city region followed in 2007, with the publication of the Liverpool City Region Development Plan. In 2008, relationships between the authorities deepened with the decision that they would enter a multi-area agreement. A new City Region Cabinet was established, made up of the leaders of the six local authorities in Halton, Knowsley, Sefton, St Helens and Wirral and private sector representation through the chair of the Mersey Partnership. The cabinet continued to evolve, and in 2012 the government announced the 'Liverpool City Region Deal', which came with the establishment of a local transport body.

On 21 June 2013, the Liverpool City Region Cabinet agreed that there needed to be a wholesale review of governance arrangements in the area. A report on its findings was published on 30 September 2013. The report identified the city region as one of the fastest growing economies in the UK, which had outgrown existing informal relationships between the local authorities. The report recommended the establishment of a more formal combined authority to improve the effectiveness and efficiency of local transport, promote economic development and regeneration. It was proposed that the combined authority have seven members - one from each constituent local authority, and one more from the (since disbanded) Liverpool City Region Local Enterprise Partnership.

Relationships between the local authorities were reinforced with the formal establishment of the Liverpool City Region Combined Authority on 1 April 2014.

=== Naming ===
On 21 June 2013, the Liverpool City Region Cabinet agreed to review the strategic governance arrangements across the area. Following this review, the six local authorities of the city region intended to strengthen their collaborative governance to enable the city region to optimise its economic growth potential. The authorities put forward the name 'Liverpool City Region Combined Authority' for their proposed combined authority. A draft report was published for the plan in August 2013 in which the authorities and relevant stakeholders were consulted. The consultation ran between 5 August and 6 September 2013. A revised report was published in September 2013 which confirmed that the Liverpool city region wished to pursue the creation of a Liverpool City Region Combined Authority.

The scheme to establish a Liverpool City Region Combined Authority was then submitted to the Secretary of State for Communities and Local Government by 30 September 2013. A statutory consultation followed in November 2013, however, the government published scheme used the name 'Greater Merseyside Combined Authority'. The government consultation that followed showed strong support for a name that included 'Liverpool' and not 'Merseyside'.

The name was changed to Halton, Knowsley, Liverpool, St Helens, Sefton and Wirral Combined Authority in the draft order presented to the UK parliament. This was chosen by the Department for Communities and Local Government (DCLG) because it said the local authorities could not agree a name for the combined authority and some responses to the consultation objected to the name 'Liverpool'. An explanatory memorandum attached to the orders creating the combined authorities stated that any name including 'City Region' was considered "misleading and inappropriate" by the government. DCLG stated that the combined authority could use any public name it wanted. On 21 February 2014, it was decided by the constituent councils that the authority would use the public name of Liverpool City Region Combined Authority. A motion at the inaugural meeting on 1 April 2014 proposed that the authority should formally adopt this name and it was passed unanimously, and the name change came into effect in January 2017.

=== Timeline of Liverpool city region devolution ===
Date	Description	Sources
2004	'Liverpool city region' defined in the report 'Moving Forward: The Northern Way'.	
2007	The Liverpool City Region Development Plan is published.	
2008	Six local authorities of Liverpool city region enter a multi-area agreement. The Liverpool City Region Cabinet was established.	
2012	UK central government declared the 'Liverpool City Region Deal'.	
21 June 2013	Liverpool City Region Cabinet conducted a strategic governance review.	
August 2013	Liverpool City Region Cabinet published a draft report to recommend establishment of a Liverpool City Region Combined Authority.	
5 August - 6 September 2013	Consultation on proposed Combined Authority conducted between the relevant local authorities and stakeholders.	
September 2013	Liverpool City Region Cabinet published final governance review report which recommended establishment of a Liverpool City Region Combined Authority. The report was sent to UK central government.	
November 2013	Statutory consultation on the proposed Combined Authority commenced.	
21 February 2014	The constituent councils of the Combined Authority decided to use the public name of 'Liverpool City Region Combined Authority'.	
1 April 2014	Liverpool City Region Combined Authority formally established.	
17 November 2015	First devolution agreement agreed by central government conferred powers on the Combined Authority.	
March 2016	Additional devolution agreement conferred further powers on the Combined Authority.	
5 May 2017	Steve Rotheram elected as first ever Mayor of the Liverpool City Region.	
1 March 2024	UK central government confirms 'Level 4' devolution powers for the Combined Authority.	

== Membership ==
Constituent boroughs of the Liverpool City Region

The membership of the combined authority is as follows:

Constituent membership (Note: The constituent boroughs also appoint substitute members to fill in for their council leader in their absence, in the event of the Mayor of the Liverpool City Regions absence from Combined Authority Meetings, the Deputy Mayor acts as Chair)
Name	Position within nominating authority	Nominating authority
Steve Rotheram	Mayor of Liverpool City Region	Liverpool City Region Combined Authority
Mike Wharton	Leader	Halton Borough Council (1)
Graham Morgan	Leader	Knowsley Metropolitan Borough Council (2)
Liam Robinson	Leader	Liverpool City Council (3)
George Woodward	Leader	St Helens Metropolitan Borough Council (4)
Marion Atkinson	Leader	Sefton Metropolitan Borough Council (5)
Paula Basnett	Leader	Wirral Metropolitan Borough Council (6)
Co-opted membership (non-voting)
David Meyerowitz	Chair	Business and Enterprise Board
Emily Spurrell	Merseyside Police and Crime Commissioner	Merseyside Police

These members form the combined authority. Its meetings are chaired by the Mayor of the Liverpool City Region or, in the mayor's absence, the appointed deputy mayor.

== Cabinet ==
The combined authority has a cabinet led by the Mayor. Leaders of the constituent councils, and the Police and Crime Commissioner are cabinet members and are assigned portfolios by the Mayor. The cabinet also has deputy cabinet members who are councillors from the constituent councils. As at July 2025, the composition of the Mayor's cabinet was:

Mayor of the Liverpool City Region's Cabinet
Name	Position within nominating authority	Nominating authority	Cabinet Position	Portfolio
Cabinet Members
Steve Rotheram	Mayor of Liverpool City Region	Liverpool City Region Combined Authority	Mayor (chair)	Policy, Resources, Reform, Transport
Mike Wharton	Leader	Halton	Deputy Mayor & Cabinet Member	Business, Investment and Trade
Graham Morgan	Leader	Knowsley	Cabinet Member	Housing and Regeneration
Liam Robinson	Leader	Liverpool	Cabinet Member	Innovation
Anthony Burns	Leader	St Helens	Cabinet Member	Net Zero
Marion Atkinson	Leader	Sefton	Cabinet Member	Employment, Education and Skills
Paula Basnett	Leader	Wirral	Cabinet Member	Health & Inequalities
Emily Spurrell	Police and Crime Commissioner	Merseyside Police	Cabinet Member	Crime and Policing
Deputy Cabinet Members
Carla Thomas	Councillor	Sefton	Deputy Cabinet Member	Policy, Reform and Resources
Shelly Powell	Councillor	Knowsley	Deputy Cabinet Member	Education and Skills
Portia Fahey	Councillor	Liverpool	Deputy Cabinet Member	Innovation
Gill Wood	Councillor	Wirral	Deputy Cabinet Member	Net Zero
vacant	-	-	Deputy Cabinet Member	Transport
Paulette Lappin	Councillor	Sefton	Deputy Cabinet Member	Housing and Regeneration
Sharon Thornton	Councillor	Halton	Deputy Cabinet Member	Health
Jennie Bell	Councillor	St Helens	Deputy Cabinet Member	Crime and Policy
Kate Groucutt	Councillor	St Helens	Deputy Cabinet Member	Business, Investment and Trade

== Leadership ==
=== Mayor of Liverpool City Region ===
The Liverpool City Region Combined Authority is chaired by the Mayor of the Liverpool City Region (sometimes referred to as the 'Metro Mayor').The Mayor is directly elected every four years by the electorate within the boundaries of Liverpool City Region. Once elected, the Mayor exercises the powers and functions devolved from the UK's national government, which are set out in the local area's evolving devolution arrangements. Primarily, the Mayor's role is to work alongside his colleagues within the Combined Authority and to focus on significant issues that affect the economy, infrastructure, health, wellbeing and strategic planning of the city region. The Mayor is a high-profile public figurehead and is often seen as a spokesperson for the city region, regularly quoted in the national press when important developments, announcements or public debates take place.

The incumbent Mayor is Steve Rotheram, who was elected as the first Mayor of the Liverpool City Region on 5 May 2017.

=== 2014 Leadership dispute ===
The long-term future of the authority was left in doubt after the previous leader of Liverpool City Council Joe Anderson decided to seek legal advice on Liverpool City Council leaving, following his failure to be elected as its chair. Anderson was not present during the leadership vote. Other members said he allowed his 'personal ego' and his belief he had a "God given right to chair the authority" to put it in jeopardy. The future of the authority appeared more secure following a statement by Anderson on 7 April 2014, where he made clear that the matter that caused the dispute was "closed" and that Liverpool would remain within the combined authority.

The authority held its first elections for a directly elected mayor in May 2017. The election was won by Steve Rotheram.

== Committees and boards ==
=== Committees ===
The combined authority possess a number of committees who have the responsibility to deliver functions of the Authority that are not solely reserved to the Mayor of the Liverpool City Region. May be made up of The Mayor, Combined Authority Members, Members who are members of the Councils and Non-voting members Co-opted for their expertise and advice

==== The Combined Authority (Committee) ====
Meetings of the Combined Authority are of the body corporate, whose role it is to oversee and undertake responsibility for the exercise of those functions granted to the Combined Authority through the Local Democracy, Economic Development and Construction Act 2009 and the 2014 and the 2017 Orders made under it and any subsequent enactments. see Membership

===== Stakeholder Sub-Committee =====
This is a Sub-Committee of the Combined Authority. the purpose of the Stakeholder Sub-Committee is to take decisions on behalf of the Combined Authority. The membership of the Stakeholder Sub-Committee includes the seven Members of the Liverpool City Region Combined Authority.

==== The Overview and Scrutiny Committee ====
Made up from councillors of the city regions constituent councils, The committee's role is to achieve greater public accountability over decisions made and services delivered to the whole Liverpool City Region.

==== The Audit and Governance Committee ====
Made up of members of the Combined Authority, members of the Overview and Scrutiny Committee & appointed persons to provide external independence. The committee's role is to promote and maintain high standards of conduct by Combined Authority Members, including dealing with complaints about behaviour

==== Appointment and Disciplinary Committee ====
Made up of Members of the Combined Authority, the Appointments and Disciplinary Committee deals with staff terms and conditions, including the process and procedures for the appointment and dismissal of the Head of Paid Service, the executive directors and the Monitoring Officer and determining pay and grading. as of 2024 the Mayor chairs this committee.

==== Transport Committee ====
Made up of Members of Constituent Councils, The Transport Committee's role is to undertake transport and travel policy functions on behalf of the Combined Authority, together with certain delegated functions in relation to transport and travel, the development of funding proposals and oversight of Merseytravel as the Passenger Transport Executive and Executive Body for the Combined Authority

=== Boards ===
==== Business & Enterprise Board ====
Established in 2023, the Business & Enterprise Board replaced the Local Enterprise Partnership, and was created to ensure the views of business could inform the decisions of the Combined Authority. Members were recruited from key sectors in the City Region economy, with additional seats reserved for representatives from key sectoral boards. In common with the LEP, the chair of the Board is a co-opted member of the Combined Authority. The Board meets quarterly.

==== Local Visitor Economy Partnership Board ====
The Liverpool City Region Local Visitor Economy Partnership Board (“LVEP Board”) helps to shape, deliver and advise on the Liverpool City Region's visitor economy strategy, with the overarching aims of promoting growth and improvements in both the visitor economy sector and wider City Region economy. The LVEP Board functions both as a standalone advisory board to the Liverpool City Region Local Visitor Economy Partnership currently being developed by the Combined Authority, its constituent local authorities and other partner organisations, and also as a sub-board of the Business and Enterprise Board. The board was created in 2023, with its first meeting taking place in May 2024.

==== Freeport Board ====
The membership of the LCR Freeport Board is made up of LCRCA Members, two LCR Members of Parliament, as well as other public, private and academic partners who will make decisions and provide the strategic steer required for the effective delivery of the Freeport.

==== Cabinet Boards ====
The Cabinet Boards (formerly Portfolio Boards) were established at the meeting of the Combined Authority held on 24 September 2021. Their purpose is to support early engagement with Constituent Local Authorities on policy development and decision making by the mayor's cabinet, with the board not having a decision-making role themselves. These boards are not included within the Constitution and as such are not subject to political proportionality or access to information requirements.

== Powers and responsibilities ==
=== Existing ===
The UK central government has devolved a range of powers and responsibilities to the Liverpool City Region Combined Authority and the Mayor of the Liverpool City Region. Since the inception of these authorities, several devolution agreements offered by central government have been ratified by the constituent local authorities of the Combined Authority.

The first devolution agreement was announced on 17 November 2015, which allocated powers over local business growth and support, culture, employment and skills, energy and environment, fiscal responsibilities, housing and planning, innovation and transport. The agreement was then further strengthened in March 2016, which broadened the existing powers and added additional new powers over apprenticeships, business rates, health and social care and the justice system. The government has committed to further strengthening the Liverpool city region's devolution arrangements in line with national plans surrounding the Northern Powerhouse. Therefore, the capability and capacity of the Combined Authority is designed to be dynamic and evolving.

The powers and responsibilities of the Combined Authority are listed below:

Existing powers and responsibilities of the Combined Authority	Description	Sources
Apprenticeships	The government requires the Combined Authority to improve productivity in the local area and the overall access to apprenticeships, careers education, information, advice and guidance for young people leaving school or college.	
Business growth and support	The Combined Authority works together with national government to deliver inward investment into the city region, provide jobs and long-term economic impact.; Responsibility for supporting businesses in the city region has been devolved to the Combined Authority. The Liverpool City Region Local Growth Hub service is funded by the Department for Business and Trade, to advise local businesses on how to grow and access a range of local, national support and funding.; The Combined Authority also oversees The Liverpool City Region Investment Zone and Liverpool City Region Freeport.; The Liverpool City Region Investment Zone was established in 2023 to deliver 4,000 jobs across Liverpool, Runcorn, St. Helens, Maghull and Prescot up until 2028. The Investment Zone is designed to attract up to £320 million of private investment in to the city region's health and life sciences industry. The UK government has committed to making the Liverpool city region a 'pharmaceutical production superpower'.; The investment zone complements the Liverpool City Region Freeport, home to the UK's most productive transatlantic port. It was established in 2022 by the city region's leaders as a special area covering 300 hectares of land from Wirral Waters to Port Salford. Within the Freeport, different economic regulations apply, specifically business rates relief, tax and customs incentives (including tariff-free movement of goods for both export and import). Such incentives are designed to encourage global trade and investment, attract investors and deliver regeneration. The Freeport aims to encourage growth in advanced manufacturing, pharmaceuticals and green technologies, in line with the Combined Authority's target to be net zero carbon by 2040 at the latest.	
Children's services	Central government has mandated the Combined Authority to work alongside the Department for Education, HM Treasury and the individual local authorities within the city region to periodically review and improve the way in which services are delivered to children.	
Culture and tourism	The Combined Authority develops strategies surrounding culture and creativity to accelerate economic growth and tourism in the city region.; The authority works in partnership with central government to ensure that National Museums Liverpool maintains a sustainable business model.; The government has mandated the Combined Authority to develop a National Migration Museum to reflect Liverpool's history and heritage as an internationally significant port.	
Employment and skills	The Combined Authority works in collaboration with the Department for Work and Pensions (DWP) to encourage and support local benefit claimants in to employment, especially those who are deemed by the DWP as 'hardest to help'.; The Combined Authority determines the local labour market priorities and feeds this information back to DWP.; UK Central government provides the Combined Authority with a devolved budget to be used on education, skills and training for people aged 16 years and over.; The Combined Authority then works in partnership with local colleges, further education, adult skills and training providers. It decides on how to allocate funding to them based on an agreement as to how they will achieve 'successful outcomes'.; The Combined Authority must continuously monitor the Liverpool city region's educational and economic needs to improve the standards of education, skills, vocational training and prospects for adult employment.	
Energy and environment	Central government has mandated the Combined Authority to commit to improving the environment, including maintaining high standards of cleanliness in the River Mersey.; The government recognises the River Mersey as having one of the largest tidal ranges in the UK.; The government has encouraged the authority to explore a large tidal energy system to generate low carbon energy for the city region's businesses and growing population which would harness the River Mersey's tidal range over the next century.; The Combined Authority works in collaboration with the Department of Energy and Climate Change to improve homes in the city region in order that their energy consumption is more efficient.	
Fiscal	The Combined Authority manages a Strategic Investment Fund (SIF) which ensures that its devolved funding and budgets are used for investing in economic growth.; The SIF allocates funding to significant regeneration projects throughout the city region.; The Combined Authority may use capital receipts from sales of assets as revenue funding for public service transformational initiatives.; The Combined Authority may exercise prudential borrowing.; The Combined Authority is able to retain a proportion of business rates throughout the city region.; The Liverpool City Region Mayor may place a supplement on business rates (up to a cap) to fund infrastructure projects, with consultation of the local business community.	
Health and social care	The Combined Authority works with health organisations including the Department of Health and Social Care, NHS England and local National Health Service providers in the city region to strategise on health and social care services.	
Housing and planning	The Mayor of the Liverpool City Region exercises strategic planning powers to deliver housing, employment opportunities and economic growth across the city region. This is partly delivered via the LCR Spatial Development Strategy which provides guidance as to how land will be used in the city region and where development and infrastructure of strategic importance should take place. The document works in collaboration with the six local authorities of the city region. Therefore, many planning applications that come forward across the Liverpool city region must be considered in line with the LCR Spatial Development Strategy as well as the Local Plans for each local authority.; The Mayor has the power to be consulted on and/or call-in planning applications of strategic importance to the city region, subject to the consent of the relevant Combined Authority member for the individual authority area.; The Combined Authority has the power to create a Mayoral Development Corporation to support the delivery of sites of economic potential through 'Mayoral Development Zones'. This enables the authority to undertake compulsory purchase orders which are designed to assist the delivery of development.; The Combined Authority reserves the power to develop a Land Commission (including a Joint Assets Board for economic assets). These are designed to support improved coordination between the city region and senior government officials to increase the availability of sites for economic growth and housing.; The Combined Authority works with the government to examine how national policies and funds can be best utilised to promote home ownership and housing supply in the city region.	
Innovation	The UK government supports the Liverpool City Region Combined Authority in its vision for innovation to enable future economic growth and global competitiveness.	
Justice	The Liverpool city region spans two police force areas, namely Merseyside Police and Cheshire Constabulary.; The Combined Authority works in partnership with central government and the Police and crime commissioners at Merseyside Police and Cheshire Constabulary. The government is committed to ensuring joined up local criminal justice services in the Liverpool city region.	
Transport	The Combined Authority is responsible for a devolved and consolidated local transport budget granted by the UK's central government. The budget is calculated by the government at frequent Spending Reviews.; The Combined Authority is then responsible for the coordination of public transport in the city region. It conducts this responsibility through Merseytravel.; Through the Merseyrail network, which is overseen by Merseytravel, the Combined Authority owns a fleet of trains which provide commuter rail services across the city region and adjacent areas of Cheshire and Lancashire. Extending the Merseyrail train network is a long-term commitment for the authority which will be enabled by battery technology on some of the trains.; Between late 2026 and the end of 2028, the Combined Authority will become the second area in the UK outside London to implement a full bus franchised system. Buses throughout the city region will continue to be operated by private operators, however through operating the Metro network, the Combined Authority asserts that it will have greater control over fares, tickets, routes and timetables. The authority argues that under Metro, it will also have the ability to reinvest any profit back into the city regional network to improve services for passengers. The authority further argues that this power enables bus services to be better integrated in to other modes of transport including rail services, active travel routes and Mersey Ferries.; As part of the Liverpool city region Key Route Network, the Combined Authority exercises a range of powers over local highways and roads of strategic importance.; The Liverpool City Region Mayor reserves the power to establish Clean Air Zones in the Combined Authority area.; The Combined Authority works in formal partnership with central government to deliver the government's plans associated with the Northern Powerhouse and Transport for the North.	

=== Impending ===
On 1 March 2024, the Department for Levelling Up, Housing and Communities confirmed that the Liverpool city region had been selected for increased powers. At the time of the announcement, the government indicated that it was to be known as 'Level 4' devolution, the greatest possible level of devolution available to all eligible devolved institutions in England. As one of the 'most mature' devolved institutions in the country, the government argued that the city region had the governance capability and capacity to carry out new levers of power covering areas such as culture and tourism, employment and skills, energy and environment, finance, health and social care, housing and planning, innovation, trade and investment, transport as well as the ability to influence government on future legislation.

The government also confirmed that this move did not mark the end of the city region's devolution journey, that more functions would be transferred from Whitehall and the levels of power would continue to be reviewed in the future. The individual powers offered as part of this agreement have been listed as 'impending' in the table below. These powers are optional and the Combined Authority will decide in due course which particular ones to formally adopt from this framework. Officials from central government will continue to work with officials in the Combined Authority regarding any further requirements that are needed to be satisfied in order for them to be implemented over the coming years.

The 'impending' powers of the Combined Authority are as follows:

Impending powers and responsibilities of the Combined Authority	Description	Sources
Culture and tourism	The Combined Authority will share expertise and insight with the DCMS as regards culture, heritage, sport, communities and the visitor economy, in order to maximise the impact of funding and policy decisions taken within the city region.	
Employment and skills	The LCRCA is eligible for fully devolved responsibilities over non-apprenticeship adult skills.; The Combined Authority will be eligible for fully devolved funding related to 'Free Courses for Jobs (FCFJ)'.; The Department for Education (DfE) will provide the Combined Authority with complete flexibility over its funding for 'Skills Bootcamps'.; The Combined Authority will act as the central convenor of careers provision in the city region, creating strategic partnerships with local stakeholders to ensure that services for adults and young people align and respond to the skills needs of the local economy and with local skills planning.; The Combined Authority will strengthen delivery of the National Careers Service and will enter in to a dialogue with central government on how to improve the service.; The DfE will consider the future role of the Combined Authority in the delivery of Local Skills Improvement Plans and the Local Skills Improvement Fund.; The Department for Work and Pensions (DWP) will ask the Combined Authority to establish a new Regional Labour Market Partnership Board made up of senior officers from the authority and the DWP. It should improve employment outcomes and inform better use of public funding in the city region.; The DWP will consider development of new contracted employment programmes, when necessary, in response to the city region's labour market conditions.; The Combined Authority and DWP will work together to share data and improve the efficiency of employment and skills programmes and services operating in the city region.	
Energy and environment	The government will consider devolving net zero funding to the Combined Authority, including for retrofitting buildings.; The Department for Environment, Food and Rural Affairs (DEFRA) will appoint the Combined Authority as responsible for the local nature recovery strategy (LNRS) in the city region.	
Finance	The Combined Authority will be subject to a simplified funding settlement. This will involve a single ‘consolidated pot’ of funding to be transferred from the DLUHC to the authority at each appropriate Spending Review.; The government argues that the consolidated funding will allow for better planning over the longer term, provide the Combined Authority with greater freedom and reduce administrative burden.; Following successful delivery of the consolidated pot, the Combined Authority will then become eligible to receive a single 'department style' settlement whereby it is given a budget to cover all devolved spending areas.	
Health and social care	The Department of Health and Social Care (DHSC) encourages the Combined Authority to work in partnership with the local Integrated care system as well as regional Directors of Public Health from the Office for Health Improvement and Disparities to improve population health outcomes.; The Combined Authority will be supported to take on a health improvement duty to improve the health of residents.	
Housing and planning	From 2026, the Combined Authority, in partnership with Homes England, will be able to set the overall strategic direction, objectives and local leadership for the deployment of affordable housing schemes.; The DLUHC will collaborate with the Combined Authority to improve poor quality housing in the city region.; The Combined Authority will be granted the power to make Mayoral Development Orders so that it can grant permission for strategic development opportunities, with the local planning authority's consent.; The Combined Authority will be given land assembly and compulsory purchase powers for housing, regeneration and economic development purposes subject to the agreement of the local authority constituent member and the Secretary of State for Levelling Up, Housing and Communities.; DLUHC will support the Combined Authority to establish its own public sector land commission. This support will improve the relationship between the authority and central government to identify development opportunities and sites within the city region.; The UK government will work to significantly strengthen Local resilience forums by 2030, as described in the UK government Resilience Framework. This will include a clearer role for the Combined Authority.	
Innovation, trade and investment	The Department for Business and Trade (DBT) will work with the Combined Authority to gain a view of the UK's business environment competitiveness and ability to attract regional investment.; The Combined Authority will have support from the Office for Investment at the city regional level to encourage capital investment and Foreign direct investment.; DBT will establish arrangements for the Combined Authority to gain greater influence to support business, investment and global trade opportunities.; The Department for Science, Innovation and Technology (DSIT) will periodically invite the Combined Authority to articulate its innovation research and development priorities to UK Research and Innovation (UKRI).; DSIT and UKRI will consult the Liverpool city region mayor on the development of relevant future research and innovation strategies.	
Technical adjustments to historic statutes or guidance	The government invites the Combined Authority to advise on changes to any statutory guidance or legislation applicable to its remit. The government aims for legislation to support the Combined Authority in meeting its objectives. The authority may advise the government where legislation is considered to be restrictive or should be disapplied.	
Transport	The Liverpool City Region Mayor will be responsible for a devolved and consolidated integrated local transport settlement provided at the appropriate Spending Review.; The government will work on the reform and greater devolution of the Bus Service Operators' Grant (BSOG).; The Department for Transport will work with the Combined Authority to provide zero emission buses in the city region.; The government will support a new relationship between the Combined Authority and Great British Railways (GBR) to develop the local and national rail network.; National Highways will develop a closer working relationship with the Combined Authority to support the delivery of local transport plans.; The government will commit to the Liverpool city region gaining the standards of public transport seen in London, with improved services, simpler fares and integrated ticketing.; In partnership with constituent councils, the Combined Authority will develop a single set of taxi and private hire vehicle licensing standards across the entire city region.; In partnership with constituent councils, the Combined Authority will restrict and enforce against pavement parking in the city region.; Active Travel England (ATE) will provide support to ensure walking, wheeling and cycling schemes in the Liverpool city region.	

== Housing and planning ==
In 2020, the Combined Authority ran a consultation program called "LCR Listens: Our Places" on a proposed strategy for planning across the city region, which gained the views of people who don't typically participate in spatial development consultations. Their work won a Planning Award 2020 for 'stakeholder engagement in planning (plan-making)'.

Across September and November 2020, the combined authority started a land commission – reported as the first of its kind in England to re-orientate the city region's economy around community wealth building. This was in partnership with Centre for Local Economic Strategies.
