= 2016 St Helens Metropolitan Borough Council election =

2016 local election in England

The 2016 St Helens Metropolitan Borough Council election took place on 5 May 2016 to elect members of St Helens Metropolitan Borough Council in England. This was on the same day as other local elections.

== Results by ward ==
=== Billinge and Seneley Green ===
Billinge and Seneley Green
Party	Candidate	Votes	%	±%
Labour	Dennis McDonnell	1,606		
UKIP	Peter Peers	747		
Conservative	Judith Margaret Collins	517		

=== Blackbrook ===
Blackbrook
Party	Candidate	Votes	%	±%
Labour	Alan Cunliffe	1,529		
UKIP	Barry Joseph Critchley	377		
Conservative	Nancy Jane Ashcroft	235		

=== Bold ===
Bold
Party	Candidate	Votes	%	±%
Labour	John Wiseman	1,184		
UKIP	Ian Edward Pennington	350		
Conservative	Barbara Evelyne Wooddock	195		
Green	David O'Keefe	162		

=== Earlestown ===
Earlestown
Party	Candidate	Votes	%	±%
Labour	Charlie Preston	1,507		
UKIP	Mark Paul Sherman	401		
Conservative	Les Skeech	297		

=== Eccleston ===
Eccleston
Party	Candidate	Votes	%	±%
Liberal Democrats	Teresa Veronica Sims	2,276		
Labour	Alex Graham	834		
Conservative	Kathleen Sheila Barton	232		
UKIP	Susan Gwyneth Wagstaff	226		

=== Haydock ===
Haydock
Party	Candidate	Votes	%	±%
Labour	Anthony James Burns	1,653		
UKIP	Mark Joseph Hitchen	437		
Conservative	Melanie Ann Marie Lee	253		

=== Moss Bank ===
Moss Bank
Party	Candidate	Votes	%	±%
Labour	Paul Michael John Lynch	1,455		
UKIP	Laurence Christopher Allen	504		
Conservative	Margaret Hilda Ethel Harvey	255		
Independent	Steve Broughton	233		
Green	Deb Connor	148		

=== Newton ===
Newton
Party	Candidate	Votes	%	±%
Labour	Seve Gomez-Aspron	1,208		
Liberal Democrats	David James Smith	647		
Conservative	John Philip Cunliffe	307		
UKIP	Mark Stephen Richardson	279		
Green	Rachel Parkinson	181		

=== Parr ===
Parr
Party	Candidate	Votes	%	±%
Labour	Andy Bowden	1,333		
UKIP	Susan Levy	229		
Independent	Paul Brown	104		
Conservative	Madeleine Patricia Wilcock	88		

=== Rainford ===
Rainford
Party	Candidate	Votes	%	±%
Conservative	Rob Reynolds	1,423		
Labour	Alex Mitchell	906		
UKIP	Anthony James Parr	247		

=== Rainhill ===
Rainhill
Party	Candidate	Votes	%	±%
Labour	Barrie Andrew Grunewald	2,062		
Conservative	Graham Samuel Woodhouse	667		

=== Sutton ===
Sutton
Party	Candidate	Votes	%	±%
Labour	Jimmy Jackson	1,210		
Independent	John Beirne	896		
UKIP	John Michael Fairhurst	290		
Liberal Democrats	Brian Thomas Spencer	212		
Conservative	Mark Stephen Collins	75		

=== Thatto Heath ===
Thatto Heath
Party	Candidate	Votes	%	±%
Labour	Nova Louise Charlton	1,653		
UKIP	Tony Rundle	399		
Conservative	Lisa Mackarell	214		

=== Town Centre ===
Town Centre
Party	Candidate	Votes	%	±%
Labour	Lynn Susan Clarke	1,322		
UKIP	Paul David Leyland	318		
Conservative	Henry John Patrick Spriggs	146		
Independent	Jonathan Casson	111		

=== West Park ===
West Park
Party	Candidate	Votes	%	±%
Labour	Paul Joseph Pritchard	1,523		
Labour	Derek Long	1,378		
UKIP	Martin William Ellison	452		
Green	Jessica Ayesha Northey	408		
Conservative	Richard William Barton	396		

=== Windle ===
Windle
Party	Candidate	Votes	%	±%
Labour	Gill Neal	1,235		
Conservative	Wally Ashcroft	759		
UKIP	Maria Alison Parr	285		
Green	Ann Shacklady-Smith	188		
