= St Helens Town Hall =

Municipal building in St Helens, Merseyside, England

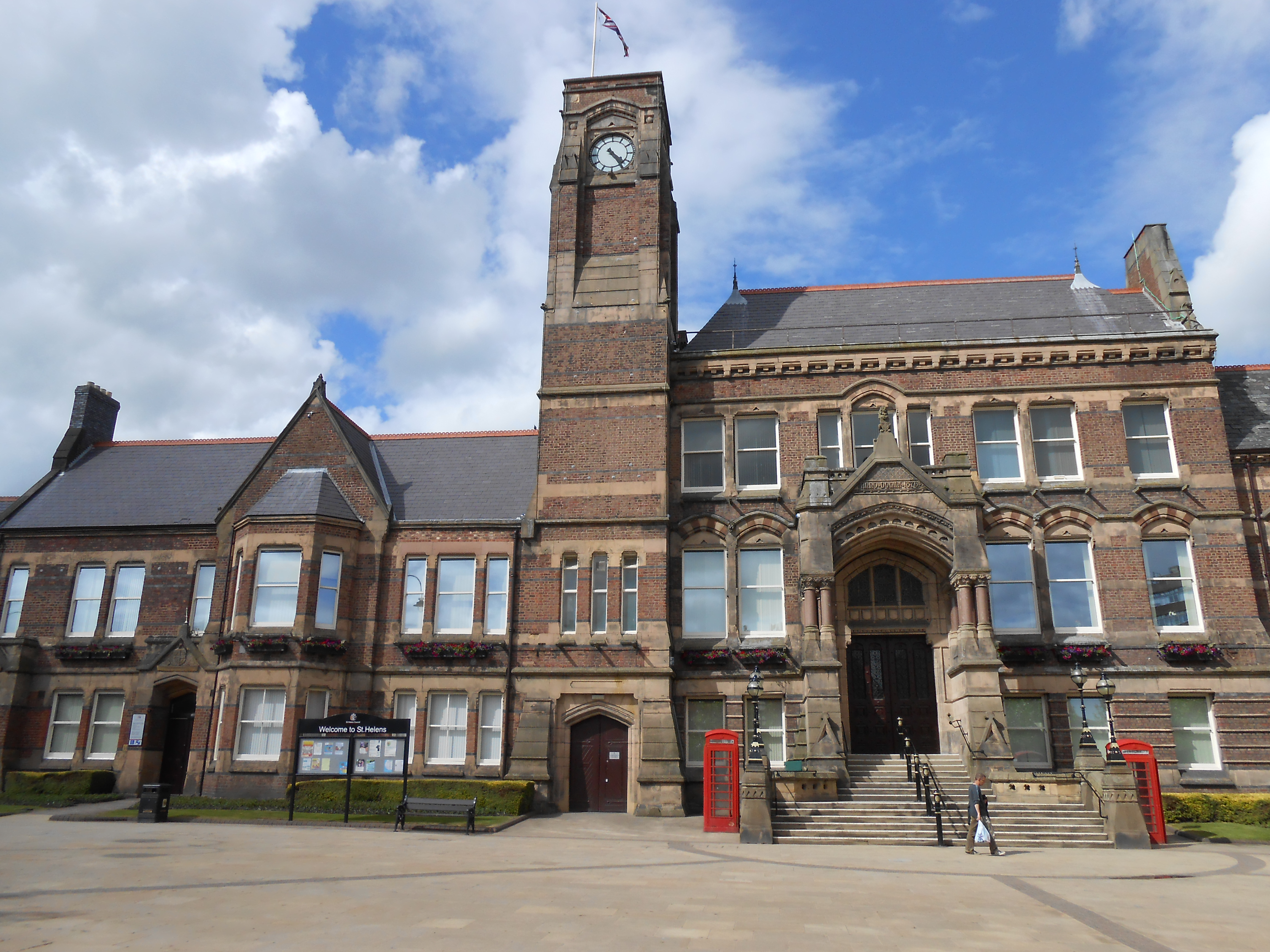
- St Helens Town Hall

- Shown in Merseyside
- 53.4543°N 2.7353°W
- Location: St Helens, Merseyside

History
- Built: 1876

Site notes
- Architectural style: Victorian style

St Helens Town Hall is a municipal building in Bickerstaffe Street in St Helens, Merseyside, England. Although the town hall itself, which is the headquarters of St Helens Council, is not a listed building, there are two telephone kiosks flanking the entrance which are listed.

== History ==
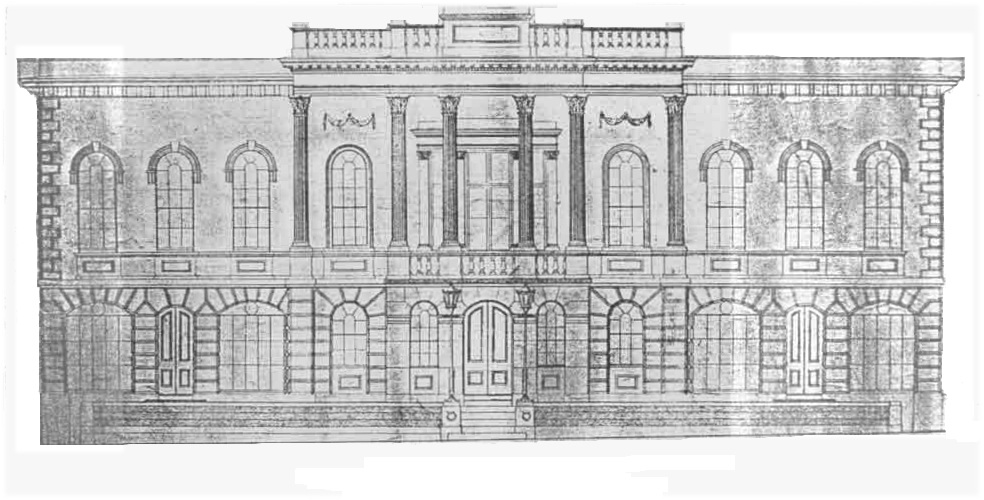
A drawing depicting the first town hall in St Helens

The first town hall, which was designed in the Italianate style and featured a large hexastyle portico with piers on the ground floor supporting Corinthian order columns on the first floor, was completed in 1839. It contained a large assembly hall for holding "courts, concerts, balls, and public meetings" as well as a lock up for holding prisoners. The town hall became the headquarters of the new municipal borough of St Helens on 2 February 1868 but, after the first town hall was badly damaged in a fire in 1871, civic leaders decided to procure a new town hall on the same site; the foundation stone was laid on 7 November 1873.

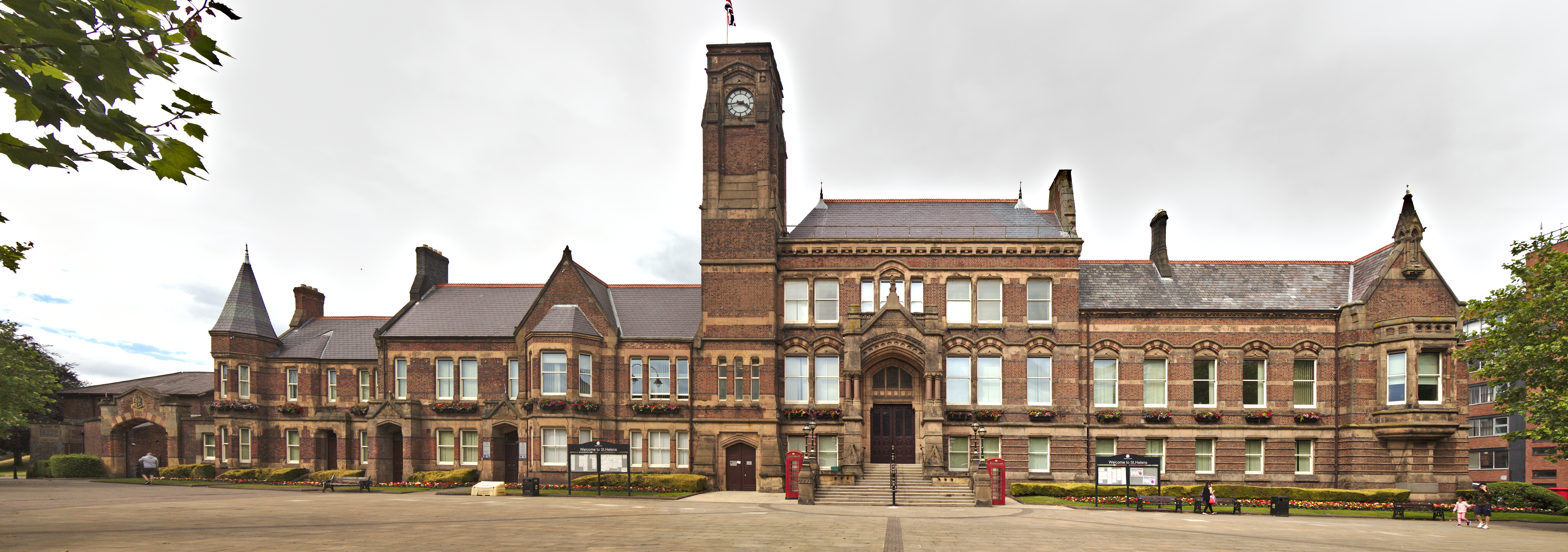
The footprint of the new town hall covered 6,000 square yards (5,000 m^{2}) and it presented a 200 ft (61 m) frontage to Bickerstaffe Street.

The new town hall, which was designed in the Victorian style, was completed in 1876 and opened on 5 June. The design involved an asymmetrical main frontage of twenty bays facing Bickerstaffe Street; the central section of five bays featured a flight of steps leading up to a double-height stone portico with piers on the ground floor supporting paired Corinthian order columns on the first floor and an arch with a pediment above. There was a clock tower on the left of the central section with a steeple. Through the portico, a flight of steps led into a large vestibule beyond which lay an assembly (or concert) hall, with a stage at one end and seating for over 800 people. Directly above the vestibule was the council chamber, with wood panelling and stone fireplaces, alongside which was the mayor's parlour. Stained glass windows on the main staircase depicted St Helena holding a shield which bore the coat of arms of the town; a figure of the saint was also placed atop the gable on the east wing of the building (which contained a variety of offices and function rooms). The western portion of the building contained a court room and police station; there was also a fire brigade depot (with a large fire engine house being provided under the assembly rooms).

St Helens Town Hall, early 20th century (before the loss of the steeple).

After St Helens had become a county borough in 1887, the conductor, Sir Thomas Beecham, supported by an ensemble drawn from the Liverpool Philharmonic Orchestra and the Hallé in Manchester, conducted his first public performance in the assembly hall in October 1899. The steeple on the clock tower was destroyed in a fire which took place on 9 June 1913, shortly before a visit by King George V and Queen Mary in July 1913.

King George VI and Queen Elizabeth also visited the town and appended their signatures to a commemorative memorandum to record their visit on 18 May 1938. A plaque was installed in the town hall to commemorate the contribution of the miners who were affected by the closure of Ravenhead Colliery, which had been the last functioning coal mine located close to the town centre, on 18 October 1968. The town hall was a venue for a sit-in, although there were not enough chairs to sit on, over a pay dispute, on 22 October 1970.

The town hall continued serve as the headquarters of the county borough of St Helens and became the local seat of government of the Metropolitan Borough of St Helens in 1974. Queen Elizabeth II visited the town hall and inspected a guard of honour in front of the town hall on 21 June 1977.
