= Steve Rotheram =

British politician (born 1961)

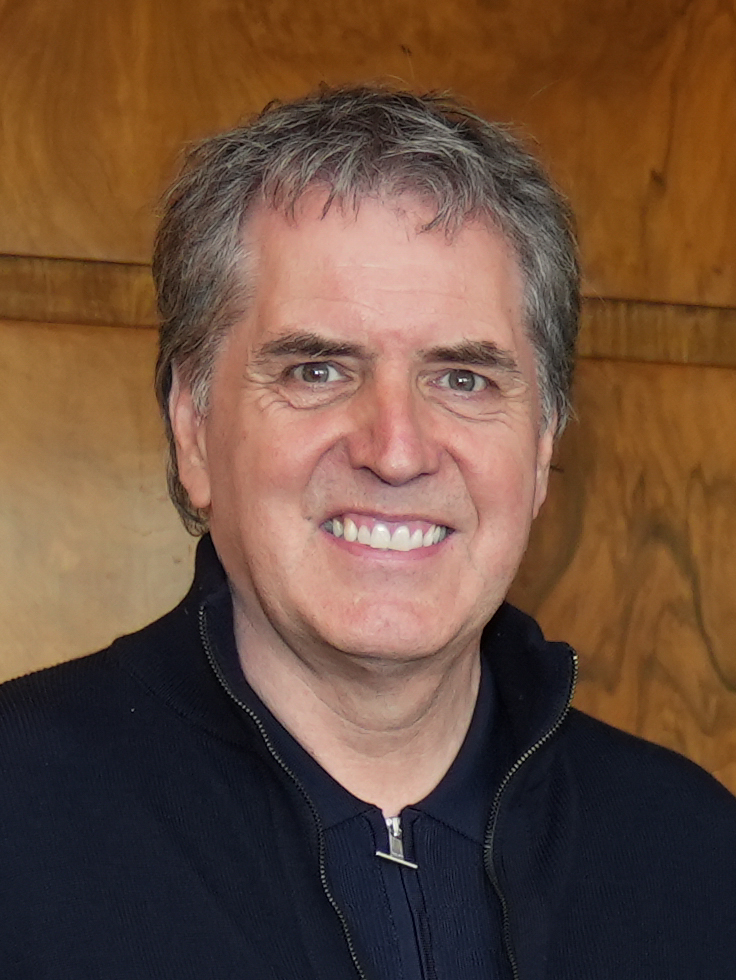
- Rotheram in 2024

Mayor of the Liverpool City Region
- Incumbent
- Assumed office 8 May 2017
- Deputy: see list
- Preceded by: Office established

Member of Parliament for Liverpool Walton
- In office 6 May 2010 – 3 May 2017
- Preceded by: Peter Kilfoyle
- Succeeded by: Dan Carden

Lord Mayor of Liverpool
- In office 2008–2009
- Preceded by: Paul Clark
- Succeeded by: Mike Storey

Member of Liverpool City Council for Fazakerley
- In office 2 May 2002 – 5 May 2011
- Preceded by: Alan Poole
- Succeeded by: Peter Clarke

Personal details
- Born: Steven Philip Rotheram; 4 November 1961 (age 64) Kirkby, UK
- Party: Labour
- Spouse: Sandra
- Children: 3
- Education: Ruffwood School; Kirkby Further Education College
- Alma mater: Liverpool John Moores University (BA); Liverpool Hope University (MA)
- Website: liverpoolcityregion-ca.gov.uk/your-metro-mayor

Steven Philip Rotheram (born 4 November 1961) is a British politician serving as the strategic authority mayor for the Liverpool City Region since 2017. A member of the Labour Party, he was Member of Parliament (MP) for Liverpool Walton from 2010 to 2017.

Born and brought up in Kirkby, Rotheram left school to become a bricklayer and set up his own construction company at the age of 22. He earned a Master's degree in Contemporary Urban Renaissance from Liverpool Hope University and worked as a business manager for the Learning and Skills Council. He was elected to represent Fazakerley for Labour on Liverpool City Council from 2002 to 2011, and served as Lord Mayor of Liverpool from 2008 to 2009.

After serving as an MP and Parliamentary Private Secretary to the Leader of the Opposition, Rotheram won a majority vote at the 2017 Liverpool City Region mayoral election and re-election in 2021. He was re-elected in 2024.

== Early life and education ==
Steven Philip Rotheram was born in Kirkby on 4 November 1961, the son of housewife Dorothy (née Phillips) and forklift driver Harry Rotheram. His father also served as a Labour Party councillor. He has seven siblings and attended Ruffwood School in Kirkby. His parents divorced when he was a teenager, which Rotheram later partly attributed to his father's absences caused by his devotion to his political career.

== Career before politics ==
Rotheram left school at the age of 16 to become a bricklayer, setting up his own company at the age of 22. He spent eight months rebuilding war-torn infrastructure in the Falkland Islands in 1983, an experience he did not enjoy. On his return, disillusioned by what he saw as the exploitation of employees on British building sites, he was determined not to work for anyone else again and set up the company Rotheram Builders. Alongside his work in the construction industry, he studied part-time in order to gain admittance to Liverpool John Moores University, where he studied full-time before starting a Master's in Contemporary Urban Renaissance at Liverpool Hope University. He worked as a business manager for the Learning and Skills Council for many years after graduating.

== Lord Mayor of Liverpool ==
Rotheram was elected to represent Fazakerley as a Labour Councillor for Liverpool City Council in the 2002 election. He later served as Lord Mayor of Liverpool from 2008 to 2009, which coincided with Liverpool's period as European Capital of Culture. In a 2009 speech on the 20th anniversary of the Hillsborough disaster, he said, "I'm one of the fortunate ones, as I swapped my Leppings Lane ticket for a stand seat 15 minutes before kick-off... if I can go from being a brickie in Kirkby to the Lord Mayor, who knows what these 96 people may have achieved in their lives?"

== Member of Parliament ==
After incumbent Labour MP Peter Kilfoyle announced that he would be standing down as MP for Liverpool Walton in 2010, Rotheram was overwhelmingly selected to be the Labour candidate securing 101 out of 113 votes cast by the local association. At the 2010 general election, Rotheram retained the seat with a comfortable majority of 19,818. Shortly after becoming an MP, he was elected to serve on the Communities and Local Government Committee. In October 2011, Rotheram joined the Culture, Media and Sport Committee where he asked James Murdoch if he would close The Sun newspaper following the News International phone hacking scandal in 2011.

In October 2011, Rotheram gave an emotional speech to the House of Commons where he read out the names of all 96 (Note: The number was later amended to 97.) Hillsborough disaster victims so they would be recorded in Hansard, and called for the release of all government papers relating to the disaster. After the papers were released in September 2012, showing widespread corruption from South Yorkshire Police, Rotheram called upon Prime Minister David Cameron to issue an apology on behalf of the government, which he later did.

In September 2012, along with members of The Farm, Mick Jones, and former Liverpool manager Kenny Dalglish, Rotheram helped organise a number of artists to record a cover of "He Ain't Heavy, He's My Brother" as "The Justice Collective", in an attempt to become Christmas UK number one and keep the Hillsborough justice campaign in public awareness and raise money for families' legal costs. The cover included contributions from artists such as Paul McCartney, Robbie Williams, Holly Johnson and Melanie C, as well as featuring Rotheram himself. On 23 December 2012, it was confirmed that the cover had become Christmas number one.

Rotheram was one of 16 signatories of an open letter to Ed Miliband in January 2015 calling on the party to commit to oppose further austerity, take rail franchises back into public ownership and strengthen collective bargaining arrangements. Rotheram was the Labour leader Jeremy Corbyn's Parliamentary Private Secretary.

== Liverpool City Region Mayor ==
=== First term (2017–2021) ===
In 2016, Rotheram said he intended to stand for the Labour nomination to become Liverpool City Region mayor in the 2017 mayoral election, and was selected as the Labour candidate in August 2016. He announced that he would not seek re-election as a Member of Parliament if successful in the mayoral election. Rotheram was subsequently elected mayor in 2017.

Rotheram's first months in power were focused on setting up the Liverpool City Region Combined Authority. Improving the region's transport infrastructure and connectivity was a pillar of his mayoral campaign and became the primary focus of his first term in office. In 2019, alongside Andy Burnham, he led a successful campaign to strip Northern Rail of its franchise, after services had become blighted by disruption.

During his first term, Rotheram oversaw major upgrades to the Merseyrail network in preparation for the introduction of a 52-strong fleet of new trains, the result of a £460 million investment by the Combined Authority and the opening of the first new station on the network in over 20 years at Maghull North station.

In 2019, Rotheram introduced half-price travel for apprentices aged 19-24 and launched Be More, a UCAS-style apprenticeship portal. In his Mayoral campaign, Rotheram pledged to address “the scandal of rough sleeping in Liverpool City Region” and in 2019, he launched the first phase of the Housing First programme in 2019, an £8 million pilot scheme providing homes and support to homeless people across the region.

In 2019, the Liverpool City Region Combined Authority became the first in the country to declare a climate emergency and has set a target to be net zero carbon by 2040 or sooner. Rotheram has said he “wants Liverpool City Region to be at the forefront of the Green Industrial Revolution” by investing environmental projects, improving public transport and exploring the potential for a tidal project in the River Mersey. In December 2022 Rotheram stated that he hoped the tidal power project could be generating electricity by the end of the decade.

Amidst the COVID-19 pandemic, Rotheram accepted a deal with the British government in October 2020 to place the Liverpool City Region under Tier 3 restrictions, following a sharp rise in cases across northern England. Despite facing strong criticism for agreeing to impose restrictive measures on the region, he was successful in securing additional government support for businesses affected by the restrictions. Following his re-election, he announced a £150 million COVID Recovery Fund to support the economy and create jobs as the region emerged from the pandemic.

=== Second term (2021–2024) ===
In the election of 6 May 2021, Rotheram was re-elected for a second term with an increased majority bucking the national trend against Labour in traditional heartlands. In his manifesto, Rotheram made five key pledges: helping the city region bounceback from COVID, supporting young people into education or training, improving public transport, leading the race to net-zero and improving digital connectivity.

==== Hillsborough Law ====
In January 2022, Rotheram, alongside Greater Manchester Mayor Andy Burnham, renewed calls for a Hillsborough Law to ensure fair treatment for people bereaved in public tragedies. The campaign was later supported by Keir Starmer who stated at Labour party conference in 2023 that "one of my first acts as Prime Minister will be to put the Hillsborough Law on the statute book".

==== Bus reform ====
On 6 October 2023, Rotheram delivered on a key manifesto pledge and voted to end 40 years of bus deregulation in the Liverpool City Region, using the powers in the Bus Services Act 2017 to bring services back into public control. The move was supported unanimously by leaders of the city region’s local authorities and was welcomed by local passenger groups who argued the announcement would be “transformational for passengers”.

==== New trains rollout ====
In January 2023, the first of the British Rail Class 777 trains went into service on the Merseyrail network, following a £500 million investment in rail services from the Liverpool City Region Combined Authority. The early rollout of the battery-operated trains was marred by cancellations and faults. In November 2023, Rotheram spoke of his frustration at the roll out and criticised train manufacturer Stadler and demanded immediate improvements for passengers and later announced a package of compensation for the most affected passengers and a fare freeze across the Merseyrail network. In the intervening months, performance on Merseyrail improved sharply, with train punctuality returning to the mid-90% and Merseyrail regaining its status as one of the best performing operators in the country.

==== Liverpool Strategic Futures Advisory Panel ====
Following government intervention into Liverpool City Council, Rotheram was appointed by secretary of state for levelling up, housing and communities Greg Clark to chair the Liverpool Strategic Futures Advisory Panel to develop a long-term plan to guide Liverpool City Council out of the current government intervention and help shape the future of the city. Rotheram was joined by Baroness Judith Blake and Sir Howard Bernstein and set out three keys priorities for the city rebooting Liverpool's regeneration, 21st century public service reform, and turbocharging the innovation economy. The work of the Panel was welcomed by leader of Liverpool City Council, Liam Robinson who heralded a "new era of partnership working" across the city region and Michael Gove announced a £31 million investment in the city to kickstart regeneration across the city and a commitment to work with the city region to develop an Office of Public Service Innovation.

=== Third term (2024–present) ===
In February 2023, Rotheram announced his intention to stand for a third term as Mayor and was re-selected unanimously as the Labour candidate in March. His campaign included a pledge to drive up foreign direct investment into the Liverpool City Region by 25% by the end of the decade and a commitment to build three new stations on the Merseyrail network at Carr Mill in St Helens, Woodchurch in Wirral, and Daresbury in Halton.

A further pre-election announcement was made regarding plans to improve connectivity to Liverpool John Lennon Airport and the city’s football stadia by introducing bus rapid transit, similar to that which operates in Belfast. The announcement was met with mixed reception with some welcoming plans to address a strategic transport priority, whilst others accused the pledge of lacking ambition.

Rotheram was re-elected at the 2024 Liverpool City Region mayoral election. He was elected with 68% of the vote and was declared the winner on 4 May 2024.

== Personal life ==
Rotheram and his wife, psychiatric nurse Sandra, have three children together. His two daughters survived the 2017 Manchester Arena bombing.

In 2024, Rotheram co-authored Head North: A Rallying Cry for a More Equal Britain with the then-Greater Manchester Mayor and Prime Minister Andy Burnham. Rotherham is a close personal friend and ally of Burnham. The book was described by Jonathan Ball in the New Statesman as simplifying the North–South divide in England to "'London elite' vs 'neglected north' caricatures". He felt it was a conflict of interest that the book was ghostwritten by Liam Thorp, political editor of the Liverpool Echo, "the most senior local journalist tasked with holding [Rotheram] to account", who he felt was "painting flawed local leaders in overly positive hues".

== Notes ==
Political offices
Preceded by Paul Clark	Lord Mayor of Liverpool; 2008–2009	Succeeded by Mike Storey
Preceded by Karen Buck	Parliamentary Private Secretary to the Leader of the Opposition; 2015–2017	Succeeded by Kate Hollern
New office	Mayor of the Liverpool City Region; 2017–present	Incumbent
Parliament of the United Kingdom
Preceded by Peter Kilfoyle	Member of Parliament for Liverpool Walton; 2010–2017	Succeeded by Dan Carden
