= Mayor of the Liverpool City Region =

Mayoral post in England

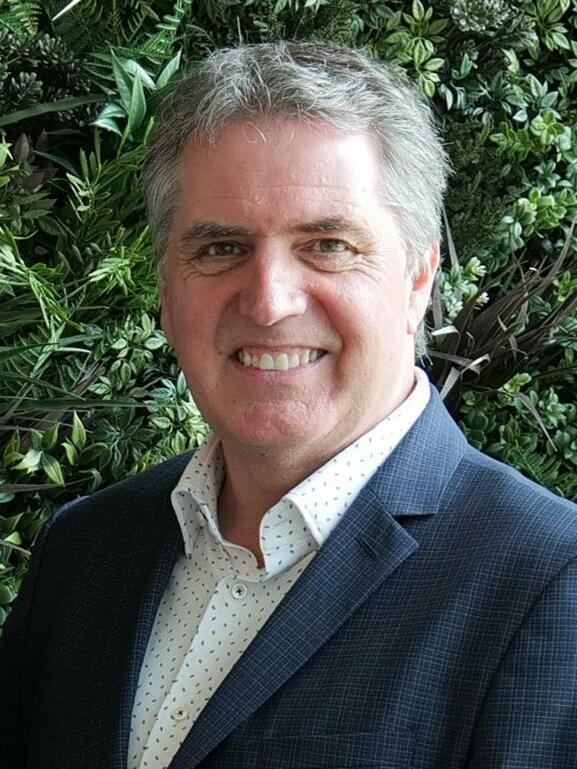
- Incumbent; Steve Rotheram since 8 May 2017
- Style: Mayor
- Status: Combined authority metro mayor
- Member of: Liverpool City Region Combined Authority; Council of the Nations and Regions; Mayoral Council for England
- Appointer: Electorate of the Liverpool City Region
- Term length: 4 years
- Constituting instrument: Cities and Local Government Devolution Act 2016
- Deputy: Deputy Mayor
- Salary: £96,000
- Website: Liverpool City Region Mayor

The mayor of the Liverpool City Region (Note: Legally the mayor of the Halton, Knowsley, Liverpool, St Helens, Sefton and Wirral Combined Authority) (also styled as metro mayor) is the strategic authority mayor of the Liverpool City Region, who is responsible for regional governance over a number of areas, the Mayor has powers devolved to them from the Central Government, as well as this the mayor chairs the Liverpool City Region Combined Authority.

The office was created under the Cities and Local Government Devolution Act 2016 which allowed for the creation of 'mayors' to lead combined authorities in England.

The first, and current, officeholder is Steve Rotheram, who was elected to the post in May 2017 and was elected for second and third terms in 2021 and 2024 respectively.

== Powers and responsibilities ==
The Mayor chairs the Liverpool City Region Combined Authority, which is responsible for governance of the region.

The mayor handles a £30 million a year budget, which is reviewed every five years by HM Treasury, as well as being in control of a consolidated transport budget, coordinating economic development in the region, the adult skills budget and strategic planning for land and other roles.

Unlike five other English mayoralties, the mayor of the Liverpool City Region does not incorporate the powers of the police and crime commissioner role for the relevant local constabulary (Merseyside Police). In March 2019 Steve Rotheram requested to the government that the role be incorporated into the role of the mayor of the Liverpool City Region, in line with the powers of these mayors. This was supported by the leader of Knowsley Borough Council. However, the Liverpool City Region is not the same area as the Merseyside Police area, which does not include Halton.

In October 2023, it was announced that the Liverpool City Region would be bringing buses in the region back under public ownership, giving the mayor control over routes, frequencies, fares, standards and more.

The mayor is a member of the Mayoral Council for England and the Council of the Nations and Regions.

== Governance arrangements ==
Unlike the directly elected London Assembly scrutiny structure that operates in Greater London, the Mayor of the Liverpool City Region sits on the Liverpool City Region Combined Authority alongside the six council leaders as the seventh member and chair.

The council leaders form the part of senior members of the Mayor's cabinet, each with a clear portfolio of responsibilities, with one of the council leaders selected by the mayor to act as Deputy Mayor.

== List of mayors ==
=== Mayor of the Liverpool City Region ===
Mayor of the Liverpool City Region
Name	Picture	Term of office		Elected	Political party
Steve Rotheram		8 May 2017	Incumbent	2017; 2021; 2024	Labour Co-op

=== Deputy mayors ===
The deputy mayor of the Liverpool City Region, is a council leader from one of the boroughs of the City Region and portfolio holder in the mayor's cabinet, appointed at the mayor's discretion. The functions of the role are outlined in the City Regions constitution to act in the event of the mayor's absence, to fulfill the functions of the mayor in their absence such as chairing the combined authority, or to discharge any powers of the mayor that could not reasonably be delayed. The role was established in 2021. Unlike the mayor, they do not have a honorific style such as Deputy Mayor in front of their name.

Deputy mayors of the Liverpool City Region
Name	Picture	Term of office		Mayor	Council	Political party
Janette Williamson		May 2021	June 2023	Rotheram	Wirral	Labour
David Baines		June 2023	July 2024	Rotheram	St Helens	Labour
Mike Wharton		July 2024	Incumbent	Rotheram	Halton	Labour
