= Prudential borrowing =

Prudential borrowing is the set of rules governing local authority borrowing in the UK. Introduced by the Local Government Act 2003, the framework freed local government from centrally imposed borrowing controls. Under prudential borrowing, the amount of debt and other liabilities most local authorities can incur is no longer capped by an upper limit. Instead, borrowing must conform to the Prudential Code, published by the Chartered Institute of Public Finance and Accountancy (CIPFA), which requires that capital expenditure and investment plans be affordable, prudent, and sustainable.
