= Halton Borough Council =

British governing body

- Coat of arms

- Corporate logo

Type
- Type: Unitary authority of the Borough of Halton

History
- Founded: 1 April 1974

Leadership
- Mayor: Pamela Wallace, Labour since 20 May 2026
- Leader: Angela Ball, Labour since 8 July 2026
- Chief Executive: Andrew Donaldson since March 2026

Structure
- Seats: 54 councillors
- Graph of the party split among 54 seats.
- Political groups: Administration (30) Labour (30) Other parties (24) Reform (16) Liberal Democrats (3) Independent (5)

Elections
- Voting system: Plurality-at-large
- Last election: 7 May 2026
- Next election: 6 May 2027

Motto
- Latin: Industria Navem Implet, lit. 'Industry Fills the Ship'

Meeting place
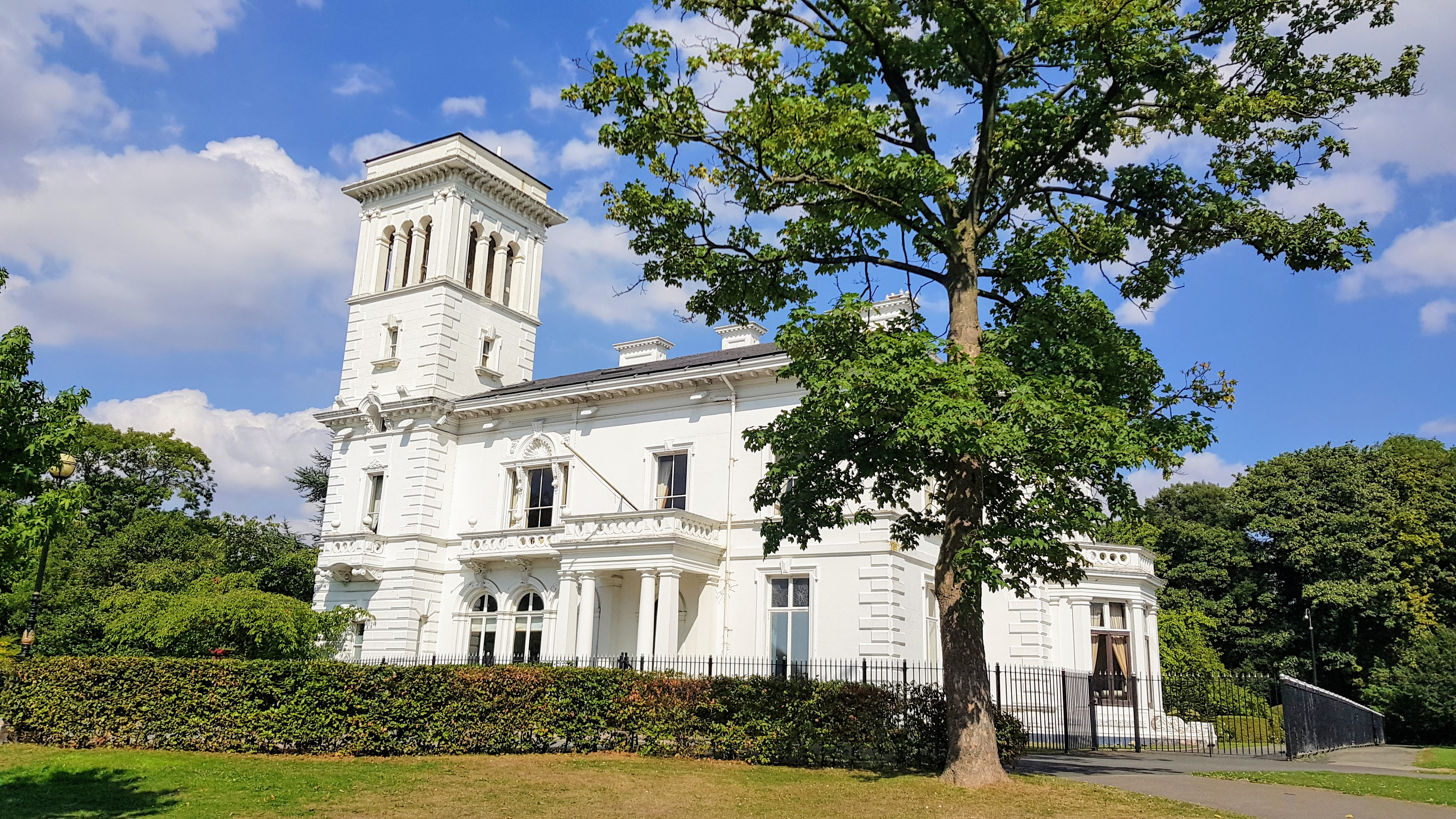
- Runcorn Town Hall

Website
- www.halton.gov.uk

Halton Borough Council is the local authority for Halton, a local government district with borough status in the ceremonial county of Cheshire, England. Since 1998 the council has been a unitary authority, being a district council which also performs the functions of a county council. Since 2014 the council has been a member of the Liverpool City Region Combined Authority.

The council has been under Labour majority control since its creation in 1974. The council has offices in both the borough's towns of Runcorn and Widnes; full council meetings are usually held at Runcorn Town Hall and the main administrative offices are at the Municipal Building in Widnes.

== History ==
The non-metropolitan district of Halton and its council were created on 1 April 1974 under the Local Government Act 1972, covering the whole area of two former districts and parts of another two, all of which were abolished at the same time:

- Runcorn Rural District (parishes of Daresbury, Moore and Preston Brook only)
- Runcorn Urban District
- Whiston Rural District (parish of Hale only)
- Widnes Municipal Borough

Widnes and Hale, north of the River Mersey, had been in Lancashire prior to the reforms. The new borough was named Halton after the medieval Barony of Halton which had been centred on Halton Castle in Runcorn, but had included land on both sides of the Mersey.

The first election to the new council was held in 1973. For its first year the council acted as a shadow authority alongside the area's outgoing authorities. The new district and its council formally came into being on 1 April 1974, at which point the old districts and their councils were abolished. The district was awarded borough status from its creation, allowing the chair of the council to take the title of mayor.

From 1974 until 1998, Halton Borough Council was a lower-tier authority providing district-level services, with Cheshire County Council providing county-level services. In 1998, Halton gained responsibility for county-level services. The way this change was implemented was to create a new non-metropolitan county of Halton covering the same area as the existing borough, but with no separate county council; instead the existing borough council took on county functions, making it a unitary authority.

The borough remains part of the ceremonial county of Cheshire for the purposes of lieutenancy and shrievalty. It also continues to be served by Cheshire Police and the Cheshire Fire and Rescue Service.

Since 2014 the council has been a member of the Liverpool City Region Combined Authority, which also includes the local authorities of Knowsley, Liverpool, St Helens, Sefton and Wirral; the five metropolitan district councils which constitute the county of Merseyside. As a unitary authority, Halton's status is similar to the metropolitan district councils. The combined authority has been led by the directly elected Mayor of the Liverpool City Region since 2017. The combined authority provides strategic leadership and co-ordination for certain functions across the region, but Halton Borough Council continues to be responsible for most local government functions.

== Governance ==
Halton Borough Council provides both district-level and county-level functions. Some strategic functions in the area are provided by the Liverpool City Region Combined Authority; the leader of Halton Borough Council sits on the combined authority as Halton's representative. Parts of the borough are covered by civil parishes, including Daresbury, Hale, Halebank, Moore, Preston Brook, and Sandymoor, which form a lower tier of local government for their areas.

=== Political control ===
The council has been under Labour majority control since its creation in 1974.

Lower tier non-metropolitan district

Party in control	Years
Labour	1974–1998

Unitary authority

Party in control	Years
Labour	1998–present

=== Leadership ===
The role of mayor is largely ceremonial in Halton. Political leadership is provided by the leader of the council. The first leader, John Collins, had been the last leader of Widnes Borough Council, one of the council's predecessors. The leaders since 1974 have been:

Councillor	Party	From	To
John Collins	Labour	1974	Aug 1981
Ted Gleave	Labour	1981	May 1989
Stan Hill	Labour	May 1989	18 May 1993
Dave Cargill	Labour	18 May 1993	18 May 1999
Tony McDermott	Labour	May 1999	2010
Rob Polhill	Labour	21 May 2010	May 2021
Mike Wharton	Labour	21 May 2021	8 Jul 2026
Angela Ball	Labour	8 Jul 2026	

=== Composition ===
The last election was in 2026. Following subsequent changes up to July 2026, the composition was:

Party	Seats
Labour	30
Reform	16
Liberal Democrats	3
Independent	5
Total	54

The next election is due in May 2027.

== Elections ==
Since the last boundary changes took effect in 2021, the council has comprised 54 councillors representing 18 wards, each electing three councillors. Elections are held three years out of every four, with a third of the council (one councillor for each ward) elected each time for a four-year term of office. The fourth year, in which no elections are held, is known as a 'fallow year'.

== Premises ==
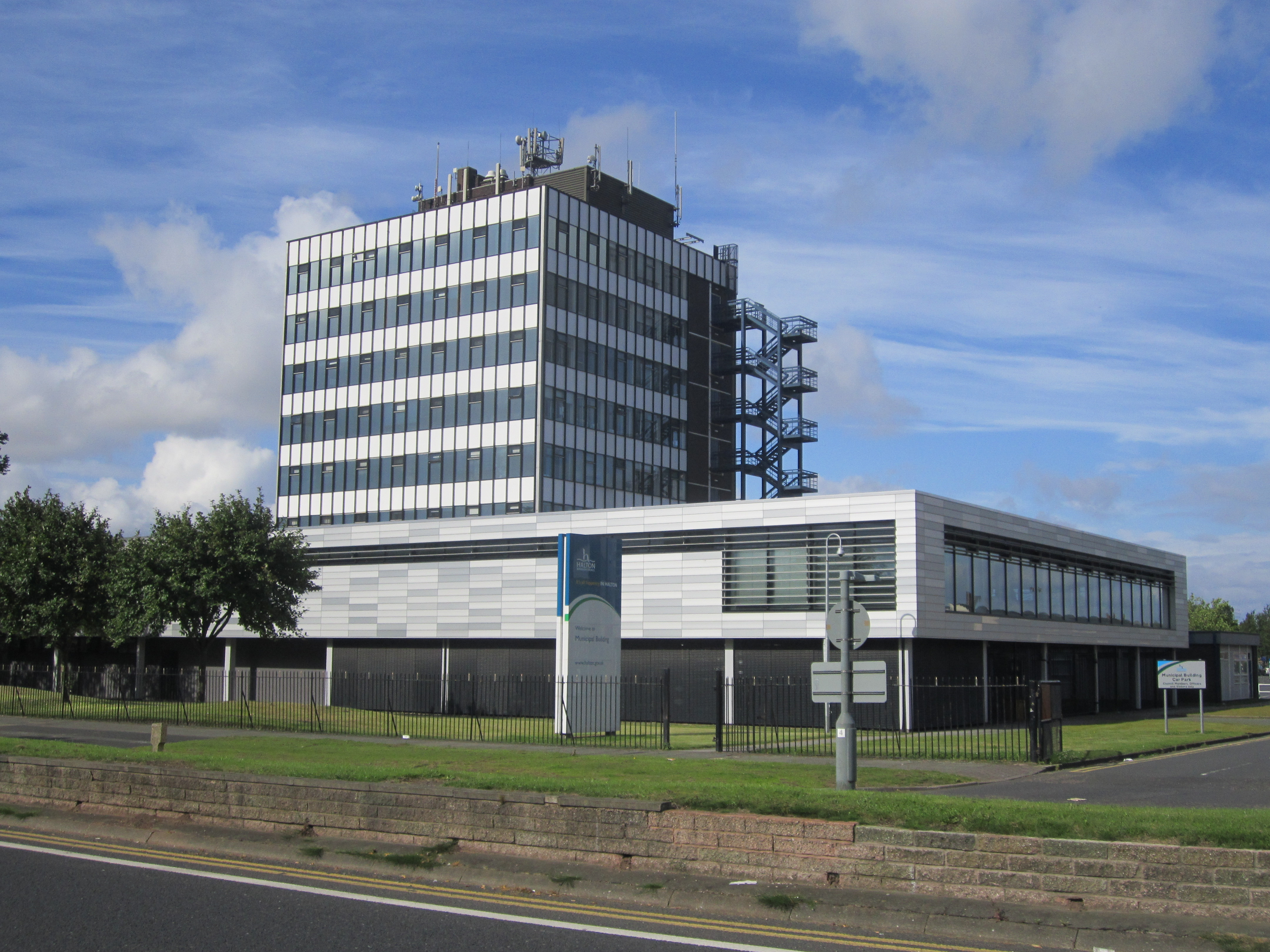
Municipal Building, Widnes: the council's administrative headquarters

Full council meetings are generally held at Runcorn Town Hall on Heath Road. It was completed in 1856 as a large house called Halton Grange. The house was bought by Runcorn Urban District Council in 1932 and converted to become their town hall.

The council's main administrative offices are at the Municipal Building on Kingsway in Widnes, which had been completed in 1967 for Widnes Borough Council. It also has offices at Rutland House in Runcorn town centre.

== Mayors of Halton ==
The Mayor of Halton is a ceremonial post with a term typically lasting for 12 months.

List of Mayors of Halton since 1974
Term	Mayor
2025/26	Martha Lloyd Jones
2024/25	Kevan Wainwright
2023/24	Valerie Hill
2022/23	Mark Dennett
2021/22	Christopher Rowe
2019/21	Margaret Horabin
2018/19	John Bradshaw
2017/18	Alan Lowe
2016/17	Ged Philbin
2015/16	Ellen Cargill
2014/15	Shaun Osborne
2013/14	Margaret Ratcliffe JP
2012/13	Tom McInerney
2011/12	Keith Morley
2010/11	Marie Wright
2009/10	Frank Fraser
2008/09	Kath Loftus
2007/08	Mike Hodgkinson
2006/07	John Swain
2005/06	Peter Lloyd Jones
2004/05	Pat Tyrrell
2003/04	Ron Hignett
2002/03	Glyn Redican
2001/02	Chris Loftus
2000/01	Julie Devaney
1999/00	Robert Gilligan
1998/99	Anthony McDermott
1997/98	Ian Evans
1996/97	Francis Nyland
1995/96	Stan Hill
1994/95	Liam Temple
1993/94	Jack Pimblett
1992/93	John Weaver
1991/92	Olive Smith
1990/91	William Flynn
1989/90	David Cargill
1988/89	Allen Inett
1987/88	Reginald Eastup
1986/87	Stan Broome
1985/86	John Hughes
1984/85	Kenneth Ebbrell
1983/84	Owen Ludlow
1982/83	Raymond Aston
1981/82	Robert Beswick
1980/81	Catherine Gerrard
1979/80	Edwin Gleave
1978/79	Arthur Parr
1977/78	Albert Dodd
1976/77	William Howell
1975/76	Charles Helsby
1974/75	Alan Millar

== Coat of arms ==
Coat of arms of Halton Borough Council
Adopted 6 October 1983 Years in use 42 Crest On a Wreath Or and Gules, four Roses set in square Gules barbed and seeded Proper and standing within the same a Garb gold. Escutcheon Gules, four lozenges conjoined in pale Or between two pallets wavy Azure fimbriated Argent. Supporters On the dexter side a Male Griffin reguardant Azure beaked rayed and the forelegs Or langued and clawed Gules holding fesswise in the dexter claw an alembic Gold and on the sinister side a Lion reguardant Sable armed Gules crowned Or supporting by the sinister paw an Abbatial Crozier with Sudarium Proper all upon a Compartment comprising a Segment of Steel Proper. Motto 'Industria Navem Implet'
