= Halebank =

Village in Cheshire, England

Coordinates: 53.348°N 2.775°W

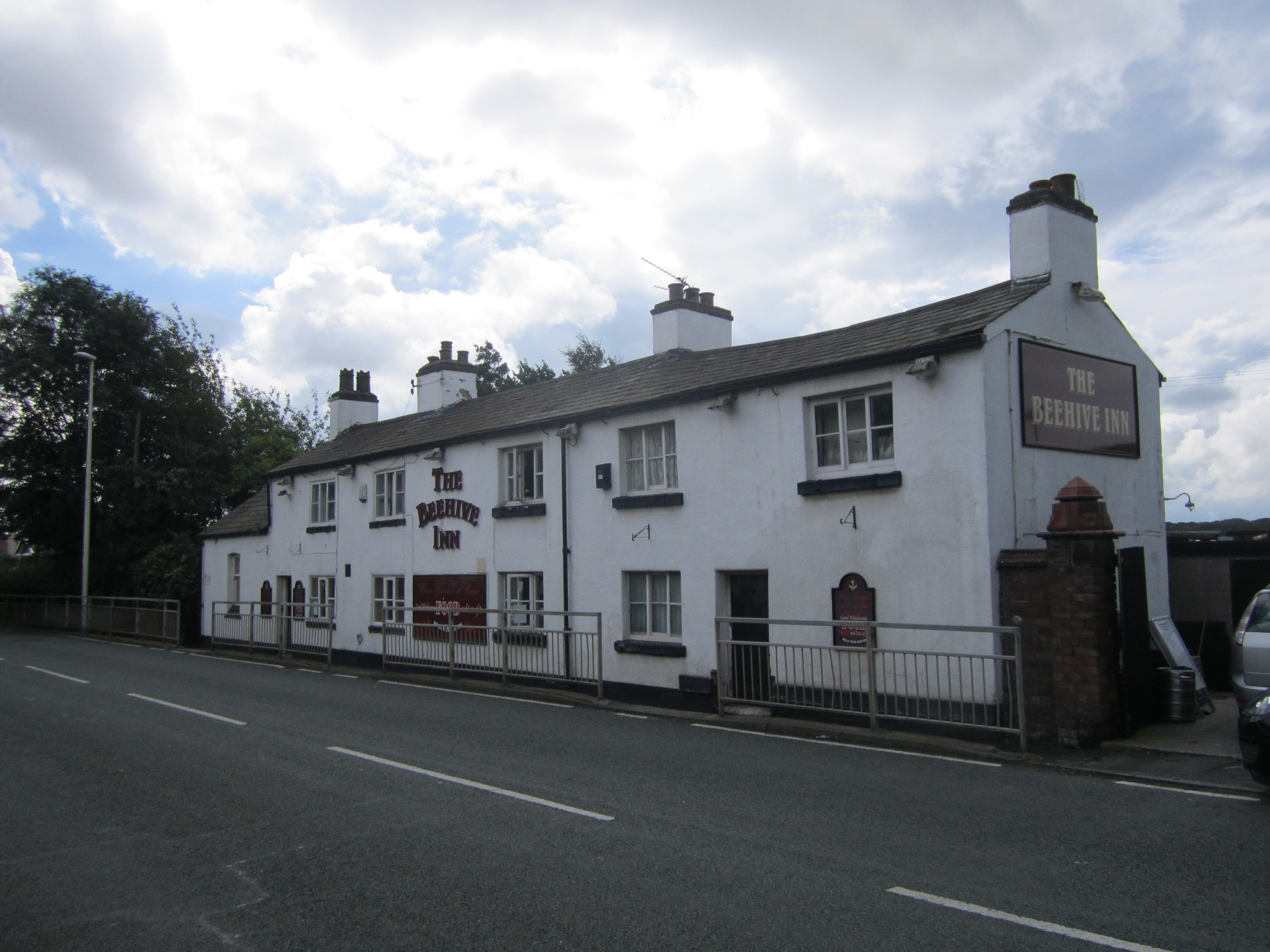
- 'The Beehive Inn' public house, Halebank

- Location within Cheshire
- Population: 1,898 (2011 census)
- OS grid reference: SJ483838
- Civil parish: Halebank
- Unitary authority: Halton
- Ceremonial county: Cheshire
- Region: North West
- Country: England
- Sovereign state: United Kingdom
- Post town: WIDNES
- Postcode district: WA8
- Dialling code: 0151
- Police: Cheshire
- Fire: Cheshire
- Ambulance: North West
- UK Parliament: Widnes and Halewood

Halebank is a village and civil parish in the Borough of Halton, Cheshire, England. The area locally referred to as Halebank was officially created by the Halton (Parish Electoral Arrangements) Order 2008. The parish lies in the western part of the town of Widnes.

In the 2011 census Halebank had a population of 1,898.
