= St Helens Borough Council =

Local government body in England

- Council logo

Type
- Type: Metropolitan borough council

Leadership
- Mayor: Stephen Little, Reform UK since 20 May 2026
- Leader: George Woodward, Reform UK since 20 May 2026
- Chief Executive: Mark Palethorpe since April 2025

Structure
- Seats: 48 councillors
- Graph of the party split among 48 seats.
- Political groups: Administration (34) Reform (34) Other parties (14) Labour (4) Newton-le-Willows Ind. (3) Rainhill Ind. (3) Liberal Democrats (3) Conservative (1)
- Joint committees: Liverpool City Region Combined Authority; Merseyside Fire and Rescue Authority; Merseyside Police and Crime Panel
- Length of term: 4 years

Elections
- Voting system: First-past-the-post
- Last election: 7 May 2026
- Next election: 2 May 2030

Motto
- Latin: Ex Terra Lucem, lit. 'From the Earth, Light' (Note: Formerly Latin: Prosperitas in Excelsis, lit. 'Flourishing Well')

Meeting place
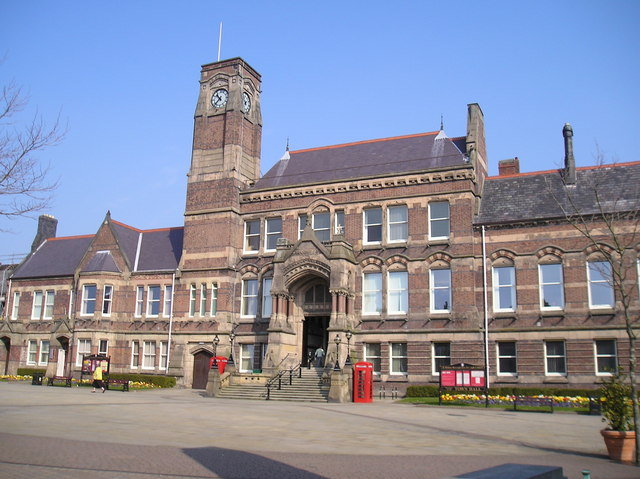
- Town Hall, Victoria Square, St Helens, WA10 1HP

Website
- www.sthelens.gov.uk

St Helens Borough Council, legally St Helens Metropolitan Borough Council, is the local authority of the Metropolitan Borough of St Helens in Merseyside, England. It is a metropolitan borough council and provides the majority of local government services in the borough. The council has been a member of the Liverpool City Region Combined Authority since 2014.

The council has been under Reform UK majority control since 2026. It is based at St Helens Town Hall.

== History ==
The first local authority for the town of St Helens was a body of improvement commissioners established in 1845. The town was incorporated to become a municipal borough in 1868, after which it was governed by a body formally called the 'mayor, aldermen and burgesses of the borough of St Helens', generally known as the corporation, town council or borough council.

When elected county councils were established in 1889, St Helens was considered large enough to provide its own county-level services, and so it became a county borough, independent from the new Lancashire County Council, whilst remaining part of the geographical county of Lancashire.

The larger Metropolitan Borough of St Helens and its council were created in 1974 under the Local Government Act 1972 as one of five metropolitan districts within the new metropolitan county of Merseyside. The new district covered the whole area of four former districts and parts of another three, all of which were abolished at the same time:

- Ashton-in-Makerfield Urban District (new parish of Seneley Green only, rest went to Wigan)
- Billinge and Winstanley Urban District (new parish of Billinge Chapel End only, rest went to Wigan)
- Haydock Urban District
- Newton-le-Willows Urban District
- Rainford Urban District
- St Helens County Borough
- Whiston Rural District (parishes of Bold, Eccleston, Rainhill, Windle only)

The first election to the new council was held in 1973. For its first year the council acted as a shadow authority alongside the area's outgoing authorities. The new metropolitan district and its council formally came into being on 1 April 1974, at which point the old districts and their councils were abolished.

The metropolitan district was awarded borough status from its creation, allowing the chair of the council to take the title of mayor, continuing St Helens' series of mayors dating back to 1868. The council styles itself St Helens Borough Council rather than its full formal name of St Helens Metropolitan Borough Council.

From 1974 until 1986 the council was a lower-tier authority, with upper-tier functions provided by Merseyside County Council. The county council was abolished in 1986 and its functions passed to Merseyside's five borough councils, including St Helens, with some services provided through joint committees.

Since 2014 the council has been a member of the Liverpool City Region Combined Authority, which has been led by the directly elected Mayor of the Liverpool City Region since 2017. The combined authority provides strategic leadership and co-ordination for certain functions across the region, but St Helens Borough Council continues to be responsible for most local government functions.

== Governance ==
St Helens Borough Council provides metropolitan borough services. Some strategic functions in the area are provided by the Liverpool City Region Combined Authority; the leader of St Helens Borough Council sits on the combined authority as St Helens' representative. Parts of the borough are covered by civil parishes, which form an additional tier of local government for their areas.

=== Political control ===
The council has been under Reform UK majority control since 2026.

Political control of the council since the 1974 reforms took effect has been as follows:

Party in control	Years
Labour	1974–2004
No overall control	2004–2010
Labour	2010–2026
Reform	2026–present

=== Leadership ===
The role of mayor is largely ceremonial in St Helens, usually being held by a different councillor each year. Political leadership is provided by the leader of the council. The leaders since 1974 have been:

Councillor	Party	From	To
Len Williams	Labour	Apr 1974	May 1978
Gerald Baxter	Labour	May 1978	1983
Brian Green	Labour	May 1983	26 Jun 1985
Marie Rimmer	Labour	26 Jun 1985	21 Apr 1993
Dave Watts	Labour	May 1993	May 1997
Mike Doyle	Labour	May 1997	May 1999
Marie Rimmer	Labour	May 1999	May 2006
Brian Spencer	Liberal Democrats	2006	May 2010
Marie Rimmer	Labour	19 May 2010	15 May 2013
Barrie Grunewald	Labour	15 May 2013	18 Apr 2018
Derek Long	Labour	18 Apr 2018	22 May 2019
David Baines	Labour	22 May 2019	15 May 2024
Anthony Burns	Labour	15 May 2024	May 2026
George Woodward	Reform	20 May 2026	

=== Composition ===
Following the 2026 election, and subsequent changes up to August 2026, the composition of the council is as follows:

Party	Seats
Reform	34
Labour	4
Newton-le-Willows Independents	3
Rainhill Independents	3
Liberal Democrats	3
Conservative	1
Total	48

The next full election is due in 2030.

== Elections ==
Since the last boundary changes in 2022, 48 councillors have been elected from 18 wards, with elections held every four years.

== Premises ==
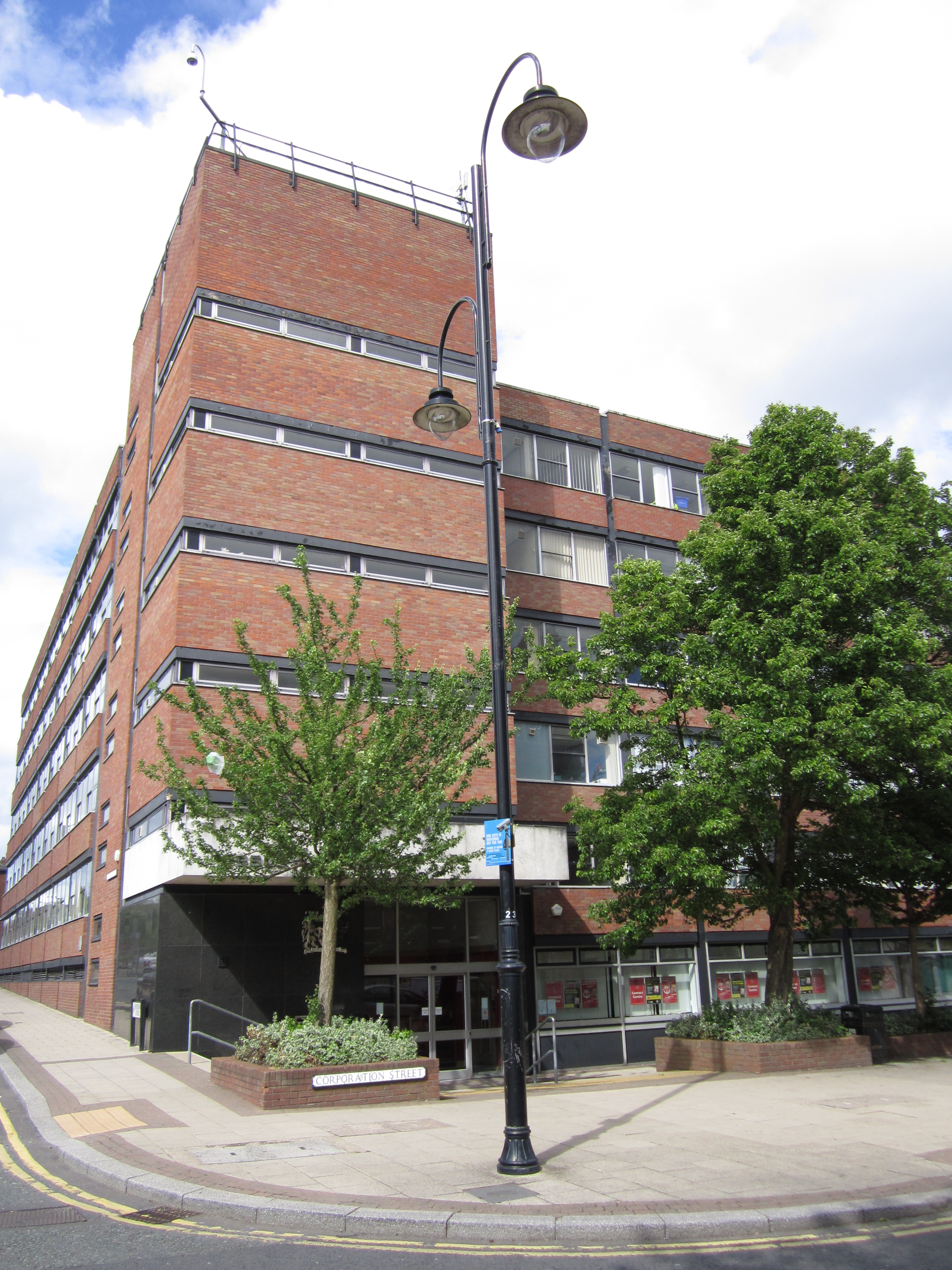
Wesley House, Corporation Street

The council meets and has its customer reception at St Helens Town Hall overlooking Victoria Square in the town centre. The building was built in 1876 for the old borough council. The council's main offices are in the adjoining Wesley House on Corporation Street.
