= 2016 Stratford-on-Avon District Council election =

2016 UK local government election

The 2016 Stratford-on-Avon District Council election took place on 5 May 2016 to elect members of Stratford-on-Avon District Council in England. This was on the same day as other local elections.
