= 2016 Rochford District Council election =

2016 UK local government election

← 2015	5 May 2016	2018 →
	First party	Second party	Third party
Party	Conservative	Rochford Resident	UKIP
Last election	29	2	3
Seats before	29	2	3
Seats won	21	6	4
Seat change	▼8	▲4	▲1
Popular vote	24,046	6,203	5,941
Percentage	46.1%	11.9%	11.4%
Swing	▲3.1%	▼5.0%	▼10.4%
	Fourth party	Fifth party	Sixth party
Party	Liberal Democrats	Green	Independent
Last election	2	2	0
Seats before	2	2	0
Seats won	4	3	1
Seat change	▲2	▲1	▲1
Popular vote	4,538	3,391	1,295
Percentage	8.8%	6.5%	2.5%
Swing	▲5.1%	▲3.7%	▲0.3%
- Results of the 2016 Rochford District Council election

The 2016 Rochford District Council election took place on 5 May 2016 to elect members of Rochford District Council in England. Due to boundary changes, all seats on the council were up for election at the same time, with each ward electing three Councillors. This was on the same day as other local elections.

== Results summary ==
Rochford District Council election, 2016
Party	Seats	Gains	Losses	Net gain/loss	Seats %	Votes %	Votes	+/−
Conservative	29	1	4	▼8		46.1	24,046	▲3.1
Rochford Resident	6	4	0	▲4		11.9	6,203	▼5.0
UKIP	4	2	1	▲1		11.4	5,941	▼10.4
Liberal Democrats	4	1	0	▲2		8.8	4,538	▲5.1
Green	3	1	0	▲1		6.5	3,391	▲3.7
Independent	1	1	0	▲1		2.5	1,295	▲0.3
Labour	0	0	1	▼1		12.8	6,699	▲3.2

== Ward results ==
=== Downhall & Rawreth ===
Downhall & Rawreth
Party	Candidate	Votes	%	±%
Liberal Democrats	Chris Black	1,111	60.4	▲12.7
Liberal Democrats	Ron Oatham	945		
Liberal Democrats	Chris Stanley	865		
Conservative	Keith Podd	305	16.6	▼13.7
Conservative	Deborah Mercer	303		
Rochford Resident	John Chaffin	279	15.2	New
Conservative	Tony Hollis	266		
Labour	Shaun Cain	145	7.9	New
Majority				
Liberal Democrats hold				
Liberal Democrats hold				
Liberal Democrats win (new seat)				

=== Foulness & The Wakerings ===
Foulness & The Wakerings
Party	Candidate	Votes	%	±%
UKIP	Neil Hookway	649	32.0	▲0.3
UKIP	Daniel Efde	623		
UKIP	Tina Hughes	615		
Conservative	Barbara Wilkins	498	24.5	▼13.1
Conservative	Tony Potter	481		
Conservative	Ann Holland	414		
Independent	Trevor Goodwin	358	17.6	▲2.1
Labour	Jack Newman	285	14.0	▼1.2
Labour	David Lench	195		
Labour	Paul White	171		
Green	Simon Cross	151	7.4	New
Liberal Democrats	Tracy Arnold	90	4.4	New
Liberal Democrats	Mark Arnold	81		
Majority				
UKIP hold		Swing		
UKIP gain from Conservative		Swing		
UKIP gain from Conservative		Swing		

=== Hawkwell East ===
Hawkwell East
Party	Candidate	Votes	%
Conservative	Lesley Butcher	802	26.1
Conservative	Mike Webb	687	22.4
Rochford Resident	Elliot Mason	674	21.9
Conservative	Jo McPherson	556	18.1
Labour	Gill Gibson	353	11.5
Majority			
Conservative win (new seat)			
Conservative win (new seat)			
Rochford Resident win (new seat)			

=== Hawkwell West ===
Hawkwell West
Party	Candidate	Votes	%	±%
Rochford Resident	Christine Mason	1,058	53.0	▲11.7
Rochford Resident	John Mason	1,030		
Conservative	Julia Gooding	595	29.3	▼3.8
Conservative	Liz Marlow	504		
Labour	Robert Clemenson	345	17.3	▲9.5
Conservative	Alex Holland-Martin	345		
Majority				
Rochford Resident hold		Swing		
Rochford Resident hold		Swing		
Conservative win (new seat)				

No UKIP candidate as previous (-17.2).

=== Hockley ===
Hockley
Party	Candidate	Votes	%	±%
Rochford Resident	Irena Cassar	883	22.3	
Rochford Resident	Adrian Evans	822	20.8	
Conservative	Brian Hazlewood	735	18.6	
Conservative	Malcolm Maddocks	595	15.0	
Conservative	Keith Hudson	585	14.8	
Labour	Ian Rooke	337	8.5	
Majority				
Rochford Resident win (new seat)				
Rochford Resident win (new seat)				
Conservative win (new seat)				

=== Hockley & Ashingdon ===
Hockley & Ashingdon
Party	Candidate	Votes	%	±%
Conservative	Carole Weston	1,021	31.7	
Conservative	Mike Carter	938	29.1	
Conservative	Terry Cutmore	817	25.4	
Labour	Stephen Willis	445	13.8	
Majority				
Conservative win (new seat)				
Conservative win (new seat)				
Conservative win (new seat)				

=== Hullbridge ===
Hullbridge
Party	Candidate	Votes	%	±%
Green	Michael Hoy	1,220	48.3	▲25.7
Green	Diane Hoy	1,185		
Green	Stuart Wilson	835		
UKIP	John Bull	640	25.3	▼3.1
Conservative	Angela Hale	394	15.6	▼16.9
Conservative	Mark Hale	366		
Conservative	Angelina Marriott	322		
Labour	David Flack	271	10.7	▲1.9
Labour	Robin Hume	201		
Labour	Roger Neville	152		
Majority				
Green hold		Swing		
Green hold		Swing		
Green gain from Conservative		Swing		

No Independent candidate as previous (-7.6).

=== Lodge ===
Lodge
Party	Candidate	Votes	%	±%
Conservative	Bob Milne	936	21.0	
Conservative	Ian Ward	891	20.0	
Conservative	Simon Smith	827	18.6	
Rochford Resident	Richard Lambourne	610	13.7	
UKIP	Carol Ann Twydell	566	12.7	
Labour	Bernadette Hannon	310	7.0	
Liberal Democrats	Stephen Tellis	310	7.0	
Majority				
Conservative hold		Swing		
Conservative hold		Swing		
Conservative win (new seat)				

=== Roche North & Rural ===
Roche North & Rural
Party	Candidate	Votes	%
Conservative	George Ioannou	640	33.9
UKIP	Nicholas Cooper	578	30.6
Conservative	Laureen Shaw	466	
Labour	Kevin Salt	459	24.3
Labour	Mark Daniels	422	
Conservative	Philip Shaw	419	
Labour	Myra Weir	418	
Liberal Democrats	Daniel Irlam	210	11.1
Majority			
Conservative win (new seat)			
UKIP win (new seat)			
Conservative win (new seat)			

=== Roche South ===
Roche South
Party	Candidate	Votes	%
Conservative	Michael Lucas-Gill	457	15.3
Conservative	Mike Steptoe	422	14.1
Conservative	Arthur Williams	412	13.8
Labour	Simon Godsen	386	12.9
Labour	John Jefferies	357	11.9
UKIP	Richard Loding	330	11.0
UKIP	Marion Sawyer	315	10.5
Labour	Victoria Williams	312	10.4
Majority			
Conservative win (new seat)			
Conservative win (new seat)			
Conservative win (new seat)			

=== Sweyne Park & Grange ===
Sweyne Park & Grange
Party	Candidate	Votes	%	±%
Rochford Resident	Toby Mountain	847	23.6	
Conservative	June Lumley	785	21.9	
Liberal Democrats	James Newport	599	16.7	
Conservative	Carol Pavelin	514	14.3	
Conservative	Margaret Spencer	464	12.9	
Labour	Craig Archer	375	10.5	
Majority				
Rochford Resident win (new seat)				
Conservative win (new seat)				
Liberal Democrats win (new seat)				

=== Trinity ===
Trinity
Party	Candidate	Votes	%	±%
Conservative	David John Sperring	1,096		
Conservative	Cheryl Edwina Roe	1,081		
Conservative	David Merrick	996		
UKIP	John Hayter	912		
UKIP	Keith Anthony Gibbs	713		
Labour	Stephen James Cooper	410		
Majority				
Conservative hold		Swing		
Conservative gain from UKIP		Swing		
Conservative win (new seat)				

=== Wheatley ===
Wheatley
Party	Candidate	Votes	%	±%
Independent	Jamie Burton	937		
Conservative	John Griffin	748		
Conservative	Robin Dray	739		
Conservative	Jack Lawmon	624		
Liberal Democrats	Michael Handford	372		
Labour	Luke Houghton	350		
Majority				
Independent gain from Conservative		Swing		
Conservative hold		Swing		
Conservative win (new seat)				

* Independent candidate stood under the description 'Rayleigh Independents'.
