= 2016 Slough Borough Council election =

2016 UK local government election

Results of the 2016 Slough Borough Council election

The 2016 Slough Borough Council election took place on 5 May 2016 to elect members of Slough Borough Council in England. This was on the same day as other local elections.

== Results ==
Party	Seats won	Council make-up (change)
Labour Party	12	33 (+1)
Conservative Party	2	8 (−1)
Other	0	1 (-)

== Ward results ==
Baylis & Stoke
Party	Candidate	Votes	%
Labour	Suniya Sarfraz	1,793	86.6%
Conservative	Yashia Lasheen	277	13.4%
Majority		1,516	73.2%
Turnout		3,549	32.7%
Labour hold			

Britwell and Northborough
Party	Candidate	Votes	%
Labour	Martin Carter	1,147	66.1%
UKIP	Orlando Isernia	321	18.5%
Conservative	Łukasz Górski	266	15.3%
Majority		826	47.6%
Turnout		1,734	26.3%
Labour hold			

Central
Party	Candidate	Votes	%
Labour	Shafiq Chaudhry	1,354	70.6%
Conservative	Takmeel Sadiq	564	29.4%
Majority		790	41.2%
Turnout		1,918	29.5%
Labour hold			

Chalvey
Party	Candidate	Votes	%
Labour	Atiq Sandhu	1,434	79.5%
Conservative	Sohail Siraj	370	20.5%
Majority		1,064	59.0%
Turnout		1,804	27.4%
Labour hold			

Cippenham Green
Party	Candidate	Votes	%
Labour	Nora Holledge	1,196	54.8%
Conservative	David Munkley	538	24.7%
UKIP	Lea Trainer	388	17.8%
English Democrat	John Barrow	60	2.7%
Majority		658	30.1%
Turnout		2,182	31.0%
Labour hold			

Cippenham Meadows
Party	Candidate	Votes	%
Labour	Satpal Parmar	1,093	51.0%
Conservative	Jassy Rakhra	513	23.9%
Liberal Democrats	Robert Plimmer	307	14.3%
UKIP	Dale Bridges	229	10.7%
Majority		580	27.1%
Turnout		2,142	28.6%
Labour hold			

Elliman
Party	Candidate	Votes	%
Labour	Naveeda Qaseem	1,159	72.1%
Conservative	Neelam Iqbal	448	27.9%
Majority		711	44.2%
Turnout		1,607	27.3%
Labour hold			

Farnham
Party	Candidate	Votes	%
Labour	Mohammed Rasib	1,132	65.6%
Conservative	Alfred Gill	594	34.4%
Majority		538	31.2%
Turnout		1,726	25.8%
Labour hold			

Foxborough
Party	Candidate	Votes	%
Labour	Madhuri Bedi	548	66.9%
UKIP	Rosy Ditta	139	17.0%
Conservative	Neel Rana	132	16.1%
Majority		409	49.9%
Turnout		819	33.9%
Labour hold			

Haymill & Lynch Hill
Party	Candidate	Votes	%
Conservative	Wayne Strutton	947	45.4%
Labour	Harjinder Singh Gahir	788	37.8%
UKIP	John Talbot Francis Nash	270	13.0%
Independent	Jonathan James	79	3.8%
Majority		159	7.6%
Turnout		2,084	29.8%
Conservative hold			

Langley Kedermister
Party	Candidate	Votes	%
Labour	Michael John Holledge	1,018	52.7%
Conservative	Gurcharan Singh Mankku	710	36.8%
Liberal Democrats	Josephine Mary Hanney	202	10.5%
Majority		308	15.9%
Turnout		1,930	27.7%
Labour hold			

Langley St Mary's
Party	Candidate	Votes	%
Labour	Ted Plenty	929	42.9%
Conservative	Franke Abe	810	37.4%
UKIP	Neil Hodgson	328	15.1%
Liberal Democrats	Gary James Griffin	101	4.7%
Majority		119	5.5%
Turnout		2,168	30.5%
Labour gain from Conservative			

Upton
Party	Candidate	Votes	%
Conservative	Rajinder Singh Sandhu	1,311	53.0%
Labour	Balvinder Singh Bains	1,163	47.0%
Majority		148	6.0%
Turnout		2,474	38.5%
Conservative hold			

Wexham Lea
Party	Candidate	Votes	%
Labour	Shabnum Sadiq	1,515	74.9%
Conservative	Ahmed Nawaz	507	25.1%
Majority		1,008	49.8%
Turnout		2,022	30.9%
Labour hold			
