= 2016 Newcastle-under-Lyme Borough Council election =

2016 UK local government election

Results of the 2016 Newcastle-under-Lyme Borough Council election

The 2016 Newcastle-under-Lyme Borough Council election took place on 5 May 2016 to elect members of Newcastle-under-Lyme Borough Council in England. This was on the same day as other local elections.

== Election result ==
Newcastle-under-Lyme Borough Council Election, 2016
Party	Seats	Gains	Losses	Net gain/loss	Seats %	Votes %	Votes	+/−
Labour	11	0	0	0				
Conservative	7	1	0	+1				
Liberal Democrats	2	0	1	-1				
UKIP	0	0	0	0	0			
Independent	0	0	0	0	0			
TUSC	0	0	0	0	0			
	0	0	0	0	0			
TOTAL	20	1	1	0		100%		
