= 2016 Maidstone Borough Council election =

2016 UK local government election

Results of the 2016 Maidstone District Council election

The 2016 Maidstone Borough Council election took place on 5 May 2016 to elect members of Maidstone Borough Council in England. This was on the same day as other local elections.
