= 2016 Gosport Borough Council election =

2016 UK local government election

2016 Gosport Borough Council Election
- 5 May 2016

17 of 34 seats to Gosport Borough Council 18 seats needed for a majority
	First party	Second party	Third party
Party	Conservative	Liberal Democrats	Labour
Seats before	21	6	6
Seats won	10	5	2
Seats after	19	9	5
Seat change	▼2	▲3	▼1
Popular vote	10,359	3,193	4,826
Percentage	52.9%	16.3%	24.6%
Council control before election
Conservative
Council control after election
Conservative

The 2016 Gosport Borough Council election took place on 5 May 2016 to elect members of Gosport Borough Council in England. This was on the same day as other local elections. The Liberal Democrats gained two seats from the Conservatives and one from Labour, but the Conservatives remained in an overall majority.

After the election the composition of the council was:

- Conservative: 19
- Liberal Democrats: 9
- Labour: 5
- UKIP: 1

== Ward Results ==
=== Anglesey ===
Anglesey
Party	Candidate	Votes	%	±%
Conservative	Philip Raffaelli	922	74.6	▼7.2
Labour	David Waite	314	25.4	▲7.2
Majority		608	41.2	▼14.4
Conservative hold		Swing		

=== Brockhurst ===
Brockhurst
Party	Candidate	Votes	%	±%
Liberal Democrats	Robert Hylands	639	56.7	▲21.6
Conservative	Gary Walker	312	27.7	▲3.0
Labour	James Fox	107	9.5	▲0.1
Green	Jane Staffieri	68	6.0	▲6.0
Majority		327	29.0	▲18.6
Liberal Democrats hold		Swing		
