= 2016 Worthing Borough Council election =

2016 UK local government election

- 5 May 2016

13 of the 37 seats to Worthing Borough Council 19 seats needed for a majority

	First party	Second party	Third party
Leader	Daniel Humphreys		Robert Smytherman
Party	Conservative	UKIP	Liberal Democrats
Leader's seat	Offington		Tarring
Last election	30 seats, 44.8%	2 seats, 19.0%	4 seats, 11.3%
Seats won	11	1	1
Seats after	32	2	2
Seat change	▲2	Steady	▼2
Popular vote	9,857	5,332	3,223
Percentage	38.6%	20.9%	12.6%
Swing	▼6.2%	▲1.9%	▲1.3%
	Fourth party	Fifth party
Party	Green	Labour
Last election	1 seats, 9.4%	0 seats, 15.5%
Seats won	0	0
Seats after	1	0
Seat change	Steady	Steady
Popular vote	1,927	5,175
Percentage	7.6%	20.3%
Swing	▼1.8%	▲4.8%
- Map showing the election results. Each ward had one seat up for election.
Council control before election
Conservative
Council control after election
Conservative

The 2016 Worthing Borough Council election took place on 5 May 2016 to elect members of Worthing Borough Council in England. This was on the same day as other local elections.

== Council results ==
Worthing 2016 Borough Council election
Party	Candidates						Votes		
Party	Stood	Elected	Gained	Unseated	Net	% of total	%	No.	Net %
Conservative	13	11	2	0	+2	84.62	38.63	9857	
UKIP	13	1	1	1	±0	7.69	20.90	5332	
Liberal Democrats	13	1	0	2	-2	7.69	12.63	3223	
Labour	13	0	0	0	±0	0.0	20.28	5175	
Green	13	0	0	0	±0	0.0	7.55	1927	

== Ward results ==
=== Broadwater ward ===
Broadwater
Party	Candidate	Votes	%	±%
Conservative	Paul Baker	664	35.9	
Labour	Lorna Beaumont	489	26.4	
UKIP	Tony Anderson	344	18.6	
Liberal Democrats	John Apsey	198	10.7	
Green	Richard Battson	157	8.5	
Majority		175	9.5	
Turnout		1852	27.61	
Conservative hold		Swing		

=== Castle ward ===
Castle
Party	Candidate	Votes	%	±%
Conservative	Steve Wills	650	32.3	
UKIP	Charles James	615	30.6	
Labour	Ian Walker	348	17.3	
Liberal Democrats	Trudi Starling	293	14.6	
Green	Julian Warwick	105	5.2	
Majority		35	1.7	
Turnout		2011	31.95	
Conservative gain from UKIP		Swing		

=== Central ward ===
Central
Party	Candidate	Votes	%	±%
Conservative	Paul Westover	587	28.2	
Labour	Richard Mulholland	553	26.6	
Green	Gari Owen	384	18.5	
UKIP	Malcolm Milne	351	16.9	
Liberal Democrats	Christine Allen	203	9.8	
Majority		34	1.6	
Turnout		2078	29.10	
Conservative hold		Swing		

=== Durrington ward ===
Durrington
Party	Candidate	Votes	%	±%
Conservative	Jane Sim	498	35.2	
UKIP	Mike Jelliss	404	28.6	
Liberal Democrats	Jacqueline Cranefield	294	20.8	
Labour	Guy Chadwick	170	12.0	
Green	Thom French	48	3.4	
Majority		94	6.6	
Turnout		1414	32.11	
Conservative gain from Liberal Democrats		Swing		

=== Gaisford ward ===
Gaisford
Party	Candidate	Votes	%	±%
Conservative	Val Turner*	808	38.4	
Labour	Joe Thornton	527	25.0	
UKIP	Christopher Gould	319	15.2	
Liberal Democrats	Antony Brown	248	11.8	
Green	Rosie Turner	202	9.6	
Majority		281	13.4	
Turnout		2104	31.4	
Conservative hold		Swing		

=== Goring ward ===
Goring
Party	Candidate	Votes	%	±%
Conservative	Steve Waight	1,345	51.7	
UKIP	Sybil Betts	524	20.1	
Labour	Peggy Harris	380	14.6	
Green	David Aherne	195	7.5	
Liberal Democrats	Dimitri Seirlis	157	6.0	
Majority		821	31.6	
Turnout		2601	38.38	
Conservative hold		Swing		

=== Heene ward ===
Heene
Party	Candidate	Votes	%	±%
Conservative	Paul High*	700	36.4	
Labour	Jim Deen	629	32.7	
UKIP	Geoffrey Brown	331	17.2	
Green	Joseph Pearce	149	7.7	
Liberal Democrats	Peter Fullilove	116	6.0	
Majority		71	3.7	
Turnout		1925	31.38	
Conservative hold		Swing		

=== Marine ward ===
Marine
Party	Candidate	Votes	%	±%
Conservative	Joan Bradley*	961	45.2	
Labour	Jill Guest	415	19.5	
UKIP	Kirk Dickenson	348	16.4	
Liberal Democrats	Michael Finch	217	10.2	
Green	Antony Grace	185	8.7	
Majority				
Turnout			32.57	
Conservative hold		Swing		

=== Northbrook ward ===
Northbrook
Party	Candidate	Votes	%	±%
UKIP	Mark Withers	311	30.6	
Conservative	Karen Harman	282	27.7	
Liberal Democrats	Keith Sunderland*	198	19.5	
Labour	Darren Pearce	185	18.2	
Green	Graham McKnight	41	4.0	
Majority				
Turnout			27.26	
UKIP gain from Liberal Democrats		Swing		

=== Offington ward ===
Offington
Party	Candidate	Votes	%	±%
Conservative	Elizabeth Sparkes*	1,253		
UKIP	John Strange	433		
Labour	Jed Smith	238		
Liberal Democrats	Patricia Izod	169		
Green	Anne Weinhold	117		
Majority				
Turnout			34.79	
Conservative hold		Swing		

=== Salvington ward ===
Salvington
Party	Candidate	Votes	%	±%
Conservative	Antony Baker	946		
UKIP	David Smith	622		
Labour	David Lace	266		
Liberal Democrats	Michael Cranefield	231		
Green	Lauren Salvage	100		
Majority				
Turnout			30.87	
Conservative hold		Swing		

=== Selden ward ===
Selden
Party	Candidate	Votes	%	±%
Conservative	Keith Bickers*	695		
Labour	Michael Barrett	667		
UKIP	Graham Adams	337		
Liberal Democrats	Yvonne Leonard	165		
Green	Valerie Ellis	137		
Majority				
Turnout			33.33	
Conservative hold		Swing		

=== Tarring ward ===
Tarring
Party	Candidate	Votes	%	±%
Liberal Democrats	Hazel Thorpe	734		
Conservative	Lin Salter	468		
UKIP	Adrian Price	393		
Labour	Gina Deen	308		
Green	Caroline Ponto	107		
Majority				
Turnout			31.90	
Liberal Democrats hold		Swing		
