= 2016 Gateshead Metropolitan Borough Council election =

2016 local election in England

Results of the 2016 Gateshead Metropolitan Borough Council election

The 2016 Gateshead Metropolitan Borough Council election took place on 5 May 2016 to elect members of Gateshead Metropolitan Borough Council in England. This was on the same day as other local elections.

== Results ==
Party	Previous	After
Labour	55	54 (-1)
Liberal Democrats	11	12 (+1)
