= 2016 Tunbridge Wells Borough Council election =

2016 UK local government election

Map of the results

The 2016 Tunbridge Wells Borough Council election took place on 5 May 2016 to elect members of Tunbridge Wells Borough Council in England. This was on the same day as other local elections.
