= 2016 South Tyneside Metropolitan Borough Council election =

2016 local election in England

Map of results

The 2016 South Tyneside Council election took place on 5 May 2016 to elect members of South Tyneside Council in England. This was on the same day as other local elections.

== Results by electoral ward ==
=== Beacon & Bents ward ===
Beacon & Bents
Party	Candidate	Votes	%	±%
Labour	John Anglin	1,344	57.1	+13.6
UKIP	John Clarke	490	20.8	N/A
Green	Rhiannon Curtis	292	12.4	N/A
Conservative	Ali Hayder	227	9.6	+2.9
Majority		854	36.3	
Turnout		2,366	34.9	−2.1
Labour hold		Swing		

=== Bede ward ===
Bede
Party	Candidate	Votes	%	±%
Labour	Margaret Peacock	1,041	56.4	+8.9
Independent	Steven Harrison	585	31.7	N/A
Conservative	Mary Golightly	116	6.3	+2.1
Green	Tony Gair	105	5.7	+0.8
Majority		456	54.7	
Turnout		1,855	31.5	−1.0
Labour hold		Swing		

=== Biddick & All Saints ward ===
Biddick & All Saints
Party	Candidate	Votes	%	±%
Labour	Anne Walsh	1,032	61.8	−5.6
UKIP	Kenneth Taylor	406	24.3	N/A
Green	Peter Bristow	143	8.6	N/A
Conservative	Craig Slater	88	5.3	+0.9
Majority		626	37.5	
Turnout		1,675	26.0	−2.1
Labour hold		Swing		

=== Boldon Colliery ward ===
Boldon Colliery
Party	Candidate	Votes	%	±%
Labour	Joanne Bell	1,528	65.7	+4.3
Conservative	Ian Armstrong	487	20.9	+12.8
Green	Colin Tosh	311	13.4	N/A
Majority		1,041	44.8	
Turnout		2,342	31.8	−2.3
Labour hold		Swing		

=== Cleadon & East Boldon ward ===
Cleadon & East Boldon
Party	Candidate	Votes	%	±%
Labour	David Townsley	1,503	45.9	−0.1
Conservative	Jeff Milburn	1,468	44.8	−9.2
Green	Philip Berry	305	9.3	N/A
Majority		35	1.1	
Turnout		3,283	47.5	+2.0
Labour gain from Conservative		Swing		

=== Cleadon Park ward ===
Cleadon Park
Party	Candidate	Votes	%	±%
Labour	Alex Donaldson	896	48.6	+2.7
Independent	Colin Campbell	565	30.6	N/A
Conservative	Elizabeth Turnbull	258	14.0	+4.6
Green	Dave Herbert	125	6.8	N/A
Majority		331	18.0	
Turnout		1,854	32.3	−1.3
Labour hold		Swing		

=== Fellgate & Hedworth ward ===
Fellgate & Hedworth
Party	Candidate	Votes	%	±%
Labour	Alan Smith	1,541	74.4	+18.9
Conservative	Fiona Milburn	282	13.6	+9.9
Green	James Cunningham	248	12.0	N/A
Majority		1,259	60.8	
Turnout		2,093	35.9	−1.6
Labour hold		Swing		

=== Harton ward ===
Harton
Party	Candidate	Votes	%	±%
Labour	Pat Hay	1,136	48.4	−11.1
UKIP	Malcolm Pratt	538	22.9	N/A
Conservative	Craig Robinson	384	16.4	+6.4
Independent	Melanie Baker	289	12.3	N/A
Majority		598	25.5	
Turnout		2,355	35.0	+0.8
Labour hold		Swing		

=== Hebburn North ward ===
Hebburn North
Party	Candidate	Votes	%	±%
Labour	Liz McHugh	1,052	48.9	0
Independent	Joe Abbott	823	38.3	−0.5
Conservative	Joanna Milburn	111	5.2	+2.2
Green	Steve Richards	85	4.0	N/A
TUSC	Peter Rippon	78	3.6	N/A
Majority		229	10.6	
Turnout		2,158	30.9	+0.7
Labour hold		Swing		

=== Hebburn South ward ===
Hebburn South
Party	Candidate	Votes	%	±%
Labour	John McCabe	1,646	72.8	−13.8
Green	Matthew Giles	361	16.0	N/A
Conservative	Amy-Jane Milburn	253	11.2	−2.2
Majority		1,285	56.8	
Turnout		2,276	36.3	+0.3
Labour hold		Swing		

=== Horsley Hill ward ===
Horsley Hill
Party	Candidate	Votes	%	±%
Labour	Mark Walsh	1,436	54.4	+1.1
UKIP	Anita Campbell	521	19.8	N/A
Conservative	Marilyn Huartt	393	14.9	+7.2
Independent	David Wood	153	5.8	N/A
Green	Angela Curtis	134	5.1	N/A
Majority		915	34.6	
Turnout		2,635	37.1	−0.7
Labour hold		Swing		

=== Monkton ward ===
Monkton
Party	Candidate	Votes	%	±%
Labour	Joan Keegan	1,208	58.9	+2.6
Independent	Vikki Lawlor	583	28.4	N/A
Green	Jack McGlen	134	6.5	N/A
Conservative	Oliver Wallhead	127	6.2	−0.2
Majority		625	30.5	
Turnout		2,060	32.8	+0.7
Labour hold		Swing		

=== Primrose ward ===
Primrose
Party	Candidate	Votes	%	±%
Labour	Jim Perry	1,923	68.8	−6.5
Green	Lesley Hanson	301	17.5	N/A
Conservative	James Cain	237	13.7	+2.3
Majority		884	51.3	
Turnout		1,732	27.6	−0.4
Labour hold		Swing		

=== Simonside & Rekendyke ward ===
Simonside & Rekendyke
Party	Candidate	Votes	%	±%
Labour	Edward Malcolm	1,175	61.0	−17.0
UKIP	John Wright	485	25.2	N/A
Conservative	David Gamblin	137	7.1	+0.2
Green	David Ridley	129	6.7	N/A
Majority		690	35.8	
Turnout		1,934	30.3	+1.2
Labour hold		Swing		

=== West Park ward ===
West Park
Party	Candidate	Votes	%	±%
Labour	Gladys Hobson	825	45.2	−4.4
UKIP	Stephen Dagg	560	30.7	N/A
Conservative	Jack White	260	14.3	+4.3
Green	David Walter	133	7.3	+1.4
Independent	David Welsh	45	2.5	N/A
Majority		265	14.5	
Turnout		1,826	32.8	−0.4
Labour hold		Swing		

=== Westoe ward ===
Westoe
Party	Candidate	Votes	%	±%
Labour	Sheila Stephenson	947	44.1	−3.1
UKIP	Henry Pearce	642	29.9	N/A
Conservative	Sam Prior	360	16.8	+4.4
Green	David Francis	197	9.2	N/A
Majority		305	14.2	
Turnout		2,159	34.9	+2.1
Labour hold		Swing		

=== Whitburn & Marsden ward ===
Whitburn & Marsden
Party	Candidate	Votes	%	±%
Labour	Tracey Dixon	1,244	55.8	−20.4
UKIP	Charles McKenzie-Smith	498	22.4	N/A
Conservative	Richard Gosling	356	16.0	−7.8
Green	Colette Hume	129	5.8	N/A
Majority		746	33.4	
Turnout		2,235	38.8	+1.0
Labour hold		Swing		

=== Whiteleas ward ===
Whiteleas
Party	Candidate	Votes	%	±%
Labour	Doreen Purvis	1,097	55.1	+2.8
UKIP	Kathleen Wright	617	31.0	N/A
Conservative	Colin Lemon	152	7.6	+4.6
Green	Sarah McKeown	126	6.3	N/A
Majority		480	24.1	
Turnout		1,997	30.8	−1.4
Labour hold		Swing		
