= 2016 Bury Metropolitan Borough Council election =

2016 local election in England

2016 local election results in Bury

The 2016 Bury Metropolitan Borough Council Election took place on 5 May 2016 to elect members of Bury Metropolitan Borough Council in England. This was on the same day as other local elections.

17 seats were contested. The Labour Party won 10 seats, the Conservatives won 6 seats, and the Liberal Democrats won 1 seat.

After the election, the total composition of the council was as follows:

- Labour 32
- Conservative 16
- Liberal Democrats 3

== Election result ==
Bury kocal election result 2016
Party	Seats	Gains	Losses	Net gain/loss	Seats %	Votes %	Votes	+/−
Labour	10	1	3	-2				
Conservative	6	2	0	+2				
UKIP	0	0	0	0				
Liberal Democrats	1	1	0	+1				
Green	0	0	1	-1	0			
English Democrat	0	0	0	0	0			
Independent	0	0	1	-1	0			

== Ward results ==
Besses
Party	Candidate	Votes	%	±%
Labour	Elizabeth Fitzgerald	1,426	58.68	▼3.13
Conservative	David Lewis	486	20.00	▲5.09
English Democrat	Stephen Morris	280	11.52	▼3.77
Green	Joanne Gardner	132	5.43	N/A
Liberal Democrats	Katriona Middleton	106	4.36	▼3.35
Majority		940	38.68	▼7.84
Turnout		2,430		
Labour hold		Swing		

Church
Party	Candidate	Votes	%	±%
Conservative	Roy-Edward Walker	2,061	59.77	▲8.78
Labour	Gavin McGill	1,102	31.96	▼1.91
Green	Andrew Hunt	188	5.45	N/A
Liberal Democrats	Rodney Rew	97	2.81	▼0.90
Majority		959	27.81	▲10.69
Turnout		3,448		
Conservative hold		Swing		

East
Party	Candidate	Votes	%	±%
Labour	Stella Smith	1,566	63.45	▲6.39
Conservative	Tahira Shaffi	616	24.96	▲4.97
Green	Glyn Heath	286	11.59	N/A
Majority		950	38.49	▲4.01
Turnout		2,468		
Labour hold		Swing		

Elton
Party	Candidate	Votes	%	±%
Labour	Susan Southworth	1,418	41.88	▼3.35
Conservative	Dene Vernon	1,312	38.75	▲3.06
UKIP	Dave Bentley	465	13.73	▼1.45
Green	Charlotte Allen	123	3.63	N/A
Liberal Democrats	Jacob Royde	77	2.27	▼1.35
Majority		106	3.13	▼6.41
Turnout		3,386		
Labour hold		Swing		

Holyrood
Party	Candidate	Votes	%	±%
Liberal Democrats	Steve Wright	1,733	45.1	+9.5
Labour	Paddy Heneghan	1,463	38.1	+3.2
Conservative	Nicholas Jones	280	7.3	−5.9
UKIP	Michael Zwierzanski	229	5.9	−4.6
Green	Janneke Calle	139	3.6	−2.1
Majority		270		
Turnout				
Liberal Democrats gain from Labour		Swing		

Moorside
Party	Candidate	Votes	%	±%
Labour	Annette McKay	1,375	51.3	+0.9
UKIP	Victor Hagan	569	21.2	+1.4
Conservative	Luis McBriar	511	19.1	−5.8
Green	Larissa Heath	135	5	+0.1
Liberal Democrats	Samantha Stretch	90	3.4	+3.4
Majority		806		
Turnout				
Labour hold		Swing		

North Manor
Party	Candidate	Votes	%	±%
Conservative	Dorothy Gunther	2,281	60.8	+11.8
Labour	Timothy Butcher	1,066	28.4	+1.1
Green	Mary Heath	225	6	+0.4
Liberal Democrats	Ewan Arthur	179	4.8	−0.7
Majority		1,215		
Turnout				
Conservative hold		Swing		

Pilkington Park
Party	Candidate	Votes	%	±%
Conservative	Oliver Kersh	1,760	54.9	+5
Labour	Debra Green	1,197	37.3	+1.8
Liberal Democrats	Wilfred Davison	134	4.2	+4.2
Green	Zachery Garsia	114	3.6	−1.4
Majority		563		
Turnout				
Conservative hold		Swing		

Radcliffe East
Party	Candidate	Votes	%	±%
Labour	Rhyse Cathcart	1,242	49.6	+11.9
UKIP	Phil Husband	506	20.2	−0.6
Conservative	Zain Shah	432	17.3	−9.1
Green	Niamh McGarry-Gribbin	180	7.2	+2.3
Liberal Democrats	Robert Graham	142	5.7	+1.5
Majority		736		
Turnout				
Labour gain from Green		Swing		

Radcliffe North
Party	Candidate	Votes	%	±%
Labour	Sharon Briggs	1,456	46.85	+7.5
Conservative	Carl Curran	1,000	32.18	+1.1
UKIP	Michael Zwierzanski	539	17.34	−5.0
Green	Matthew Bailey	113	3.64	+0.2
Majority		456	14.67	
Turnout		3,108		
Labour hold		Swing		

Radcliffe West
Party	Candidate	Votes	%	±%
Labour	Tony Cummings	1,303	46.8	+0.9
Conservative	Liam Dean	458	32.2	+3.7
UKIP	Ian Henderson	438	17.3	−3.2
Green	Karen Wood	83	3.5	−0.6
Liberal Democrats	Kamran Islam	53	2.3	+0.4
Majority		845		
Turnout				
Labour hold		Swing		

Ramsbottom
Party	Candidate	Votes	%	±%
Conservative	Ian Schofield	1,695	43.8	−3.3
Labour	Karen Leach	1,658	42.9	+7.7
UKIP	David Barker	372	9.6	+1.9
Green	Zarrin Shannon	141	3.6	+2.6
Majority		37		
Turnout				
Conservative gain from Labour		Swing		

Redvales
Party	Candidate	Votes	%	±%
Labour	Shaheena Haroon	1,729	58.3	+5.3
Conservative	Julie Green	867	29.3	+3.8
Green	Paul Johnstone	367	3.4	+9.0
Majority		862		
Turnout				
Labour hold		Swing		

Sedgley
Party	Candidate	Votes	%	±%
Conservative	David Silbiger	1,693	45.4	+9.4
Labour	Andrea Simpson	1,633	43.8	+/−0.0
Liberal Democrats	Elizabeth Clayton	233	6.3	−0.4
Green	Kamila Liang	168	4.5	−0.8
Majority		60		
Turnout				
Conservative gain from Labour		Swing		

St. Mary's
Party	Candidate	Votes	%	±%
Labour	Jane Black	1,349	41.3	+1.1
Liberal Democrats	Michael Powell	1,330	40.7	+17.3
Conservative	Danny Franks	463	14.2	−5.6
Green	Jozias Bailey-Sharam	126	3.8	−2.2
Majority		19		
Turnout				
Labour hold		Swing		

Tottington
Party	Candidate	Votes	%	±%
Conservative	Greg Keeley	1,367	46.6	−2.2
Labour	Martin Hayes	929	31.7	+2.8
UKIP	Hazel Gorman	417	14.2	−0.1
Liberal Democrats	David Foss	116	4.0	+0.5
Green	Carmel Walker	103	3.5	−1.0
Majority		438		
Turnout				
Conservative hold		Swing		

Unsworth
Party	Candidate	Votes	%	±%
Labour	David Jones	1,365	48.05	+2.8
Conservative	Bernard Vincent	885	31.15	−3.1
UKIP	Tony Clough	411	14.47	+1.5
Liberal Democrats	Steve Middleton	114	4.01	+0.3
Green	Nicola Haydock	66	2.32	−1.0
Majority		480	16.90	
Turnout		2,841		
Labour hold		Swing		
