= 2016 Basingstoke and Deane Borough Council election =

2016 UK local government election

- 5 May 2016

20 seats of 60 to Basingstoke and Deane Borough Council 31 seats needed for a majority
	First party	Second party	Third party
Party	Conservative	Labour	Liberal Democrats
Seats before	32	17	7
Seats won	11	8	1
Seats after	33	19	6
Seat change	▲1	▲2	▼1
Popular vote	15,164	9,093	3,565
Council control before election
Conservative
Council control after election
Conservative

The 2016 Basingstoke and Deane Borough Council election took place on 5 May 2016 to elect members of Basingstoke and Deane Borough Council in England. This was on the same day as other local elections.

== Results summary ==
Basingstoke and Deane local election result 2016
Party	Seats	Gains	Losses	Net gain/loss	Seats %	Votes %	Votes	+/−
Conservative	11	1	0	▲1		46.4	15,164	
Labour	8	1	0	▲1		27.8	9,093	
Liberal Democrats	1		1	▼1		10.9	3,565	
UKIP	0					9.9	3,245	
Independent	0		1	▼1		4.5	1,482	
Green	0	0	0	Steady		0.3	87	
TUSC	0	0	0	Steady		0.1	47	

== Results by ward ==
=== Basing ===
Basing
Party	Candidate	Votes	%	±%
Conservative	Sven Godesen	1,594	63.8	
Liberal Democrats	Alan Read	311	12.4	
UKIP	Stanley Tennison	298	11.9	
Labour	Andrew Mountford	297	11.9	
Turnout				
Conservative hold		Swing		

=== Baughurst and Tadley North ===
Baughurst and Tadley North
Party	Candidate	Votes	%	±%
Liberal Democrats	Michael Bound	912	55.3	
Conservative	Nalin Jayawardena	557	33.8	
Labour	George Porter	181	11.0	
Turnout				
Liberal Democrats hold		Swing		

=== Bramley and Sherfield ===
Bramley and Sherfield
Party	Candidate	Votes	%	±%
Conservative	Venetia Rowland	934	54.3	
Independent	Alan Ball	606	35.2	
Labour	Stephen Rothman	180	10.5	
Turnout				
Conservative gain from Independent		Swing		

=== Brighton Hill South ===
Brighton Hill South
Party	Candidate	Votes	%	±%
Labour	Andrew McCormick	400	32.9	
Conservative	Ian Smith	314	25.8	
UKIP	Philip Heath	250	20.6	
Liberal Democrats	Robert Cooper	164	13.5	
Green	Richard Winter	87	7.2	
Turnout				
Labour gain from Liberal Democrats		Swing		

=== Brookvale and Kings Furlong ===
Brookvale and Kings Furlong
Party	Candidate	Votes	%	±%
Labour	Jack Cousens	740	43.1	
Liberal Democrats	John Shaw	485	28.2	
Conservative	Edward Norman	289	16.8	
UKIP	John Picard	204	11.9	
Turnout				
Labour hold		Swing		

=== Buckskin ===
Buckskin
Party	Candidate	Votes	%	±%
Labour	Antony Jones	655	45.0	
Conservative	Brian Simmonds	468	32.2	
UKIP	David White	241	16.6	
Liberal Democrats	John Barnes	91	6.3	
Turnout				
Labour hold		Swing		

=== Chineham ===
Chineham
Party	Candidate	Votes	%	±%
Conservative	Elaine Still	1,136	47.9	
Independent	Laura Morris	876	36.9	
UKIP	Peter King	235	9.9	
Liberal Democrats	Madeline Hussey	124	5.2	
Turnout				
Conservative hold		Swing		

=== Hatch Warren and Beggarwood ===
Hatch Warren and Beggarwood
Party	Candidate	Votes	%	±%
Conservative	Dan Putty	1,098	56.9	
UKIP	Spencer Cleary	349	18.1	
Labour	James McKenzie	285	14.8	
Liberal Democrats	Richard Whitechurch	197	10.2	
Turnout				
Conservative hold		Swing		

=== Kempshott ===
Kempshott
Party	Candidate	Votes	%	±%
Conservative	Anne Court	1,366	64.5	
Labour	Walter McCormick	405	19.1	
UKIP	Mark Hygate	348	16.4	
Turnout				
Conservative hold		Swing		

=== Kingsclere ===
Kempshott
Party	Candidate	Votes	%	±%
Conservative	Kenneth Rhatigan	979	67.8	
Labour	John Rodway	292	20.2	
Liberal Democrats	Roger Ward	172	11.9	
Turnout				
Conservative hold		Swing		

=== Norden ===
Norden
Party	Candidate	Votes	%	±%
Labour	Paul Harvey	1,191	62.6	
Conservative	Jim Holder	308	16.2	
UKIP	Duncan Stone	260	13.7	
Liberal Democrats	Doris Jones	96	5.0	
TUSC	Mayola Blagdon	47	2.5	
Turnout				
Conservative hold		Swing		

=== Oakley and North Waltham ===
Oakley and North Waltham
Party	Candidate	Votes	%	±%
Conservative	Diane Taylor	1,544	72.2	
Labour	Julie Pierce	373	17.4	
Liberal Democrats	Martin Baker	221	10.3	
Turnout				
Conservative hold		Swing		

=== Pamber and Silchester ===
Pamber and Silchester
Party	Candidate	Votes	%	±%
Conservative	Roger Gardiner	1,091	78.3	
Labour	Lydia Massey	303	21.7	
Turnout				
Conservative hold		Swing		

=== Popley East ===
Popley East
Party	Candidate	Votes	%	±%
Labour	Janet Westbrook	701	56.7	
UKIP	Alan Stone	297	24.0	
Conservative	Kizzie Fenner	239	19.3	
Turnout				
Labour hold		Swing		

=== Popley West ===
Popley West
Party	Candidate	Votes	%	±%
Labour	Jane Frankum	707	64.6	
Conservative	Jackie Saunders	240	21.9	
UKIP	Malik Azam	148	13.5	
Turnout				
Labour hold		Swing		

=== Rooksdown ===
Rooksdown
Party	Candidate	Votes	%	±%
Conservative	Simon Bound	475	70.1	
Labour	Thomas Prince	137	20.2	
UKIP	John Bentham	33	4.9	
Liberal Democrats	Obi Nwasike	33	4.9	
Turnout				
Conservative hold		Swing		

=== Sherborne St John ===
Sherborne St John
Party	Candidate	Votes	%	±%
Conservative	Tristan Robinson	541	79.1	
Labour	Michael Barsham	143	20.9	
Turnout				
Conservative hold		Swing		

=== South Ham ===
South Ham
Party	Candidate	Votes	%	±%
Labour	Colin Regan	1,134	52.3	
UKIP	Alan Simpson	582	26.8	
Conservative	Rebecca Sanders	452	20.8	
Turnout				
Labour hold		Swing		

=== Tadley South ===
Tadley South
Party	Candidate	Votes	%	±%
Conservative	David Leeks	824	63.0	
Conservative	Josephine Slimin	268	20.5	
Labour	Claire Ballard	215	16.4	
Turnout				
Conservative hold		Swing		

=== Whitchurch ===
Whitchurch
Party	Candidate	Votes	%	±%
Labour	Chloe Ashfield	754	38.5	
Conservative	David George	715	36.5	
Liberal Democrats	Steven Neilson	491	25.1	
Turnout				
Labour gain from Liberal Democrats		Swing		
