= 2016 Reigate and Banstead Borough Council election =

Council election in England

2016 local election results in Reigate and Banstead

The 2016 Reigate and Banstead Borough Council election took place on 5 May 2016 to elect members of Reigate and Banstead Borough Council in England. This was on the same day as other local elections.

== Election result ==
The composition of the council after the election was:

- Conservative: 39
- Reigate and Banstead Residents Association: 7
- Green Party of England and Wales: 2
- Liberal Democrat: 2
- UKIP: 1

== Ward results ==
=== Banstead Village ===
Banstead Village 2016
Party	Candidate	Votes	%	±%
Conservative	Eddy Humphreys*	1,205	58.16	
UKIP	Chris Byrne	365	17.61	
Liberal Democrats	James Christopher Fowler	271	13.08	
Labour	Pete Kermally	231	11.15	
Majority		840	40.55	
Turnout		2072	33.2	
Conservative hold		Swing		

=== Chipstead, Hooley and Woodmansterne ===
Chipstead, Hooley and Woodmansterne 2016
Party	Candidate	Votes	%	±%
Conservative	Keith Foreman*	1,280	60.49	
UKIP	Stephen David Alfred Russell	427	20.18	
Labour	Evan Patrick Raymond Gregory	409	19.33	
Majority		853	40.31	
Turnout		2116	31.8	
Conservative hold		Swing		

=== Earlswood and Whitebushes ===
Earlswood and Whitebushes 2016
Party	Candidate	Votes	%	±%
Conservative	James Edward Durrant*	715	34.39	
Labour	Graham Wildridge	468	22.51	
UKIP	Colin Brian Stiff	363	17.46	
Green	Sue Fenton	303	14.57	
Liberal Democrats	Jane Nicola Kulka	230	11.06	
Majority		247	11.88	
Turnout		2079	31.6	
Conservative hold		Swing		

=== Horley Central ===
Horley Central 2016
Party	Candidate	Votes	%	±%
Conservative	David Thomas Powell	803		
UKIP	Malcolm Roger Brighting	565		
Labour	Linda Jane Mabbett	483		
Majority				
Turnout		1851	29.3	
Conservative hold		Swing		

=== Horley East ===
Horley East 2016
Party	Candidate	Votes	%	±%
Conservative	Tony Schofield*	949		
Independent	Joanna Barnett	488		
Labour	Thomas James Turner	250		
Majority				
Turnout		1687	30.9	
Conservative hold		Swing		

=== Horley West ===
Horley West 2016
Party	Candidate	Votes	%	±%
Conservative	Liam Stephen Ascough	716		
UKIP	André Edward Grant	352		
Labour	Geoffrey Smith	321		
Liberal Democrats	Geoff Southall	183		
Green	Sarah Jane Finch	139		
Majority		346		
Turnout		1711	29.20	
Conservative hold		Swing		

=== Kingswood with Burgh Heath ===
Kingswood with Burgh Heath 2016
Party	Candidate	Votes	%	±%
Conservative	Simon Parnall*	1,174		
UKIP	Bob Cambridge	381		
Labour	Isabella Lane	205		
Majority		739		
Turnout		1760	31.60	
Conservative hold		Swing		

=== Meadvale and St John’s ===
Meadvale and St John’s 2016
Party	Candidate	Votes	%	±%
Liberal Democrats	Anna Frances Tarrant	768		
Conservative	Stephen Thomas Bramhall	764		
Labour	Malcolm Kemp Savidge	207		
UKIP	Alastair Richardson	169		
Green	Sarah Josephine Vaci	156		
Majority		4		
Turnout		2064	35.9	
Liberal Democrats gain from Conservative		Swing		

=== Merstham ===
Merstham 2016
Party	Candidate	Votes	%	±%
Conservative	Mark Alan Brunt*	858		
Labour	Stewart James Dack	377		
UKIP	Phyl Cambridge	262		
Liberal Democrats	Chris Howell	155		
Green	Kenneth Tze Ken Yau	137		
Majority		481		
Turnout			31.4	
Conservative hold		Swing		

=== Nork ===
Nork 2016
Party	Candidate	Votes	%	±%
Nork Residents’ Association	Jonathan Charles White	1545		
Conservative	Philip Abimbola Olanipekun	306		
Labour	Kimberley Marie Griffin	168		
Majority		1239		
Turnout			32.6	
Nork Residents’ Association hold		Swing		

=== Redhill East ===
Redhill East 2016
Party	Candidate	Votes	%	±%
Green	Steve McKenna	1,160		
Conservative	Ben Leslie	749		
Labour	Toby William Brampton	271		
UKIP	David Leigh Jones	201		
Liberal Democrats	Stuart Nicholas Holmes	99		
Majority		411		
Turnout			33.4	
Green hold		Swing		

=== Redhill West ===
Redhill West 2016
Party	Candidate	Votes	%	±%
Conservative	Natalie Jane Bramhall*	874		
Labour	Gregory Clack	422		
Green	Rob Jarrett	324		
UKIP	Tim Pearson	324		
Liberal Democrats	Andrew James Cressy	181		
Majority		452		
Turnout			35.0	
Conservative hold		Swing		

=== Reigate Central ===
Reigate Central 2016
Party	Candidate	Votes	%	±%
Independent	Christopher Thomas Henry Whinney*	810		
Conservative	Helen Jane Foreman	562		
Liberal Democrats	Helen Mary Samuel	262		
Labour	Robin Spencer	186		
UKIP	Gerard Martin Hever	150		
Green	Soo Abram	142		
Majority				
Turnout		2112	39.1	
Independent hold		Swing		

=== Reigate Hill ===
Reigate Hill 2016
Party	Candidate	Votes	%	±%
Conservative	Roger Charles Newstead*	920		
Liberal Democrats	Gregory Alec Edwin Ardan	231		
Labour	Andrew David Saunders	201		
UKIP	Laurence James Clack	135		
Majority				
Turnout		1487	34.6	
Conservative hold		Swing		

=== South Park and Woodhatch ===
South Park and Woodhatch 2016
Party	Candidate	Votes	%	±%
Conservative	James Paul King	806		
Labour	Mark Peter Collins	344		
UKIP	Joseph Brian Fox	335		
Green	Nicky Dodgson	167		
Liberal Democrats	Moray William Macleod Carey	163		
Majority		462		
Turnout			33.9	
Conservative hold		Swing		

=== Tadworth and Walton ===
Tadworth and Walton 2016
Party	Candidate	Votes	%	±%
Conservative	Victor William Broad*	1,020		
Independent	Margaret Caroline Deirdre Walking	445		
UKIP	Valerie Ann Moore	269		
Liberal Democrats	Sonja Begley-Moore	131		
Labour	David Burnley	91		
Green	Al Morten	78		
Majority		575		
Turnout			36.9	
Conservative hold		Swing		

=== Tattenhams ===
Tattenhams 2016
Party	Candidate	Votes	%	±%
Tattenhams Residents’ Association	Jill Scott Bray*	1255		
Conservative	Jane Illingworth	383		
Labour	Jacob David Thomas Bonner	141		
Green	Roger Baizeley Ponsford	59		
Majority		872		
Turnout			32.6	
Tattenhams Residents’ Association hold		Swing		
