= 2016 Harrogate Borough Council election =

2016 UK local government election

2016 local election results in Harrogate

The 2016 Harrogate Borough Council election took place on 5 May 2016 to elect members of Harrogate Borough Council in England. This was on the same day as other local elections.

== Ward results ==
=== Bishop Monkton ===
784

Bishop Monkton 2016
Party	Candidate	Votes	%	±%
Conservative	Ian Roger Galloway	556	70.9	
Green	Greig John Sharman	116	14.8	
Labour	Laura Ann Dinning	112	14.3	
Majority		440	56.1	
Conservative hold		Swing		

=== Boroughbridge ===
819

Boroughbridge 2016
Party	Candidate	Votes	%	±%
Conservative	Robert Windass	588	71.8	
Green	Shan Oakes	82	10.0	
Labour	Paul Martin Burns	81	9.9	
Liberal Democrats	Hannah Gostlow	68	8.3	
Majority		506	61.8	
Conservative hold		Swing		

=== Claro ===
1063

Claro 2016
Party	Candidate	Votes	%	±%
Conservative	Nick Duxbury	673	63.3	
Liberal Democrats	Emma Jane Walsh	195	18.3	
Green	Adam Richard Harper	122	11.5	
Labour	David Anthony Bulmer	73	6.9	
Majority		478	45.0	
Conservative hold		Swing		

=== Killinghall ===
812

Killinghall 2016
Party	Candidate	Votes	%	±%
Conservative	Michael Harrison	559	68.9	
UKIP	Kenn Hart	105	12.9	
Liberal Democrats	Bill Hoult	79	9.7	
Labour	Rio Sebastian Justin Goldhammer	69	8.5	
Majority		454	56.0	
Conservative hold		Swing		

=== Kirkby Malzeard ===
917

Kirkby Malzeard 2016
Party	Candidate	Votes	%	±%
Conservative	Margaret Edna Atkinson	713	77.8	
Labour	Vivienne Graham	204	22.2	
Majority		509	55.6	
Conservative hold		Swing		

=== Lower Nidderdale ===
797

Lower Nidderdale 2016
Party	Candidate	Votes	%	±%
Conservative	Nathan Roger Hull	561	70.4	
Green	Paul Geoffrey Trewhitt	143	17.9	
Labour	Ian Crabbe	93	11.7	
Majority		418	52.5	
Conservative hold		Swing		

=== Marston Moor ===
Marston Moor 2016
Party	Candidate	Votes	%	±%
Conservative	Tim Myatt	768	79.3	
Labour	Guy Allanson	200	20.7	
Majority		568	58.6	
Conservative hold		Swing		

=== Mashamshire ===
Mashamshire 2016
Party	Candidate	Votes	%	±%
Conservative	Nigel Simms	538	76.1	
Labour	Christine Elsie Brackley	169	23.9	
Majority		369	52.2	
Conservative hold		Swing		

=== Newby ===
845

Newby 2016
Party	Candidate	Votes	%	±%
Conservative	Nick Brown	689	81.5	
Labour	Matthew David Forth	156	18.5	
Majority		533	63.0	
Conservative hold		Swing		

=== Nidd Valley ===
844

Nidd Valley 2016
Party	Candidate	Votes	%	±%
Liberal Democrats	Tom Watson	447	53.0	
Conservative	Mick Stanley	321	38.0	
Labour	Andrew James Murday	76	9.0	
Majority		126	15.0	
Liberal Democrats hold		Swing		

=== Ouseburn ===
938

Ouseburn 2016
Party	Candidate	Votes	%	±%
Conservative	Ash Teague	678	72.3	
Liberal Democrats	Kevin Brian Hawkins	131	14.0	
Labour	Dave Wheeler	129	13.8	
Majority		547	58.3	
Conservative hold		Swing		

=== Pateley Bridge ===
Pateley Bridge 2016
Party	Candidate	Votes	%	±%
Conservative	Stanley Lumley	392	47.5	
Independent	Stan Beer	319	38.7	
Labour	David Brackley	77	9.3	
Green	Gillian Rosemary Charters	37	4.5	
Majority		73	8.8	
Conservative hold		Swing		

=== Ribston ===
876

Ribston 2016
Party	Candidate	Votes	%	±%
Conservative	Andy Paraskos	518	59.1	
Liberal Democrats	Simon James Oldroyd	159	18.2	
Labour	Alan Beatham	118	13.5	
Green	Elizabeth Collins	81	9.2	
Majority		359	40.9	
Conservative hold		Swing		

=== Spofforth with Lower Wharfedale ===
835

Spofforth with Lower Wharfedale 2016
Party	Candidate	Votes	%	±%
Conservative	Shirley Patricia Fawcett	643	77.0	
Labour	Carol Walker	116	13.9	
Liberal Democrats	Pamela Godsell	76	9.1	
Majority		527	63.1	
Conservative hold		Swing		

=== Washburn ===
1015

Washburn 2016
Party	Candidate	Votes	%	±%
Conservative	Christine Anne Ryder	761	75.0	
Labour	Nick Murray	136	13.4	
UKIP	Harvey Alexander	118	11.6	
Majority		625	61.6	
Conservative hold		Swing		

=== Wathvale ===
697

Wathvale 2016
Party	Candidate	Votes	%	±%
Conservative	Bernard Arthur Bateman	507	72.7	
Labour	Alan Peter Woodhead	190	27.3	
Majority		317	45.4	
Conservative hold		Swing		
