= 2016 Great Yarmouth Borough Council election =

2016 UK local government election

2016 local election results in Great Yarmouth

The 2016 Great Yarmouth Borough Council election took place on 5 May 2016 to elect members of Great Yarmouth Borough Council in England. This was on the same day as other local elections.
