= 2016 Worcester City Council election =

2016 UK local government election

2016 local election results in Worcester

The 2016 Worcester City Council election took place on 5 May 2016 to elect members of Worcester City Council in England. This was on the same day as other local elections.
