= 2016 Bolton Metropolitan Borough Council election =

2016 UK local government election

2016 local election results in Bolton

The 2016 Bolton Metropolitan Borough Council election took place on 5 May 2016 to elect members of Bolton Metropolitan Borough Council in Greater Manchester, England. This was on the same day as other local elections.

20 seats were contested and the Labour Party won 12 seats, the Conservatives won 5 seats, UKIP won 2 seats and the Liberal Democrats won 1 seat.

After the election, the total composition of the council was as follows:

- Labour 37
- Conservative 15
- UK Independence Party 5
- Liberal Democrats 3.

== Election result ==
Bolton local election result 2016
Party	Seats	Gains	Losses	Net gain/loss	Seats %	Votes %	Votes	+/−
Labour	12	1	3	-2	60.0	40.8	29,599	+1.9
Conservative	5	1	1	0	25.0	25.6	18,564	-4.3
UKIP	2	2	0	+2	10.0	19.3	13,987	+0.8
Liberal Democrats	1	0	0	0	5.0	11.1	8,028	+3.8
Green	0	0	0	0	0	3.0	2,193	-0.9
Independent	0	0	0	0	0	0.3	201	-1.2

== Council Composition ==
Prior to the election the composition of the council was:

↓
39	15	3	3
Labour	Conservative	LD	U

After the election the composition of the council was:

↓
37	15	3	5
Labour	Conservative	LD	U

LD - Liberal Democrats
U - UKIP

== Ward results ==
=== Astley Bridge ward ===
Astley Bridge ward
Party	Candidate	Votes	%	±%
Conservative	Hilary Fairclough	1,891	42.5	+1.1
Labour	Kevin Morris	1,114	25.1	−4.6
Liberal Democrats	Warren Fox	912	20.5	+16.3
UKIP	John Toone	440	9.9	−11.1
Green	Benjamin Deed	88	2.0	−1.6
Majority		777	17.5	+5.9
Turnout		4,445	44.0	−24.1
Conservative hold		Swing	UKIP to Lib Dem 13.7	

=== Bradshaw ward ===
Bradshaw ward
Party	Candidate	Votes	%	±%
Conservative	Jacqueline Radcliffe	1,886	50.5	−0.2
Labour	Anthony Shepherd	924	24.8	+1.1
UKIP	Stephen Thomas	524	14.0	−2.6
Independent	Eric Hyland	201	5.4	+2.9
Liberal Democrats	Garry Veevers	100	2.7	−1.4
Green	Daniel Bolton	96	2.6	−0.7
Majority		962	25.8	−1.2
Turnout		3,635	42.9	−28.4
Conservative hold		Swing	UKIP to Independent 2.5	

=== Breightmet ward ===
Breightmet ward
Party	Candidate	Votes	%	±%
Labour	Debrorah Newall	1,230	35.8	−5.1
UKIP	Harry Lamb	1,130	32.9	+5.5
Conservative	Sandra MacNeill	888	25.9	+1.2
Liberal Democrats	Stephen Howarth	94	2.7	+0.0
Green	Pamela Spurling	89	2.6	−1.6
Majority		100	2.9	−10.6
Turnout		3,431	37.0	−22.3
Labour hold		Swing	Labour to UKIP 5.3	

=== Bromley Cross ward ===
Bromley Cross ward
Party	Candidate	Votes	%	±%
Conservative	Alan Wilkinson	2,443	56.8	+0.8
Labour	Geoffrey Knowles	1,022	23.7	+3.3
UKIP	Brett Varnam	460	10.7	−2.9
Liberal Democrats	David Walsh	196	4.6	−0.1
Green	Elizabeth Spencer	183	4.3	−1.2
Majority		1,421	33.0	−2.4
Turnout		4,304	41.8	−31.5
Conservative hold		Swing	UKIP to Labour 3.1	

=== Crompton ward ===
Crompton ward
Party	Candidate	Votes	%	±%
Labour	Hanif Darvesh	2,432	67.5	+4.6
UKIP	Paul Eccles	702	19.5	+19.5
Conservative	Nadim Muslim	338	9.4	−12.3
Liberal Democrats	Anne Warren	132	3.7	−6.7
Majority		1,730	48.0	+6.7
Turnout		3,604	39.5	−20.8
Labour hold		Swing	Conservative to UKIP 15.9	

=== Farnworth ward ===
Councillor Ibrahim resigned in February 2018 due to time pressures. Paul Sanders of the Farnworth & Kearsley First Party won the by-election a month later.

Farnworth ward
Party	Candidate	Votes	%	±%
Labour	Asif Ibrahim	1,417	48.4	−1.9
UKIP	Andrew Mabon	1,066	36.4	+6.2
Conservative	Aidan Meagan	253	8.6	−4.8
Green	Trevor Bonfield	103	3.5	+0.2
Liberal Democrats	Glen Atkinson	89	3.0	+0.3
Majority		351	12.0	−8.0
Turnout		2,928	28.7	−20.8
Labour hold		Swing	Conservative to UKIP 5.5	

=== Great Lever ward ===
Great Lever ward
Party	Candidate	Votes	%	±%
Labour	Mohammed Iqbal	2,192	69.5	+2.6
UKIP	Dot Sexton	407	12.9	−1.8
Conservative	Mohammed Waqas	241	7.6	−4.8
Green	David Figgins	191	6.1	+2.5
Liberal Democrats	Robert Graham	124	3.9	+1.5
Majority		1,785	56.6	+4.4
Turnout		3,156	34.3	−21.2
Labour hold		Swing	Conservative to Labour 3.7	

=== Halliwell ward ===
Halliwell ward
Party	Candidate	Votes	%	±%
Labour	Clifford Morris	2,042	66.6	+3.5
UKIP	Sandra Harvey	503	16.4	−1.5
Conservative	Edward Mather	260	8.5	−1.4
Green	Ian McHugh	137	4.5	+0.3
Liberal Democrats	Jonathan New	122	4.0	+1.5
Majority		1,539	50.2	+5.0
Turnout		3,064	35.5	−19.6
Labour hold		Swing	UKIP to Labour 2.5	

=== Harper Green ward ===
Harper Green ward
Party	Candidate	Votes	%	±%
Labour	Champak Mistry	1,489	49.3	−2.3
UKIP	David Harvey	978	32.4	+4.7
Conservative	Robert Tyler	354	11.7	−3.5
Green	Michelle Broderick	105	3.5	+0.6
Liberal Democrats	Kevin Walsh	94	3.1	−0.3
Majority		520	17.2	−6.6
Turnout		3,029	31.8	−24.5
Labour hold		Swing	Conservative to UKIP 4.1	

=== Heaton and Lostock ward ===
Heaton and Lostock ward
Party	Candidate	Votes	%	±%
Conservative	Andrew Morgan	2,680	56.2	
Labour	Gerald Carter	1,285	27.0	
UKIP	Jonathan Baxendale	402	8.4	
Liberal Democrats	Rebekah Fairhurst	263	5.5	
Green	Laura Diggle	136	2.9	
Majority		1,395	29.3	
Turnout		4,766	45.9	−20.9
Conservative hold		Swing		

=== Horwich and Blackrod ward ===
Horwich and Blackrod ward
Party	Candidate	Votes	%	±%
Labour	Ann Cunliffe	1,516	42.5	+5.0
Conservative	Carol Forshaw	1,054	29.6	−1.5
UKIP	Derek Snowden	679	19.0	−2.6
Green	Keith Cocker	192	5.4	+0.6
Liberal Democrats	Douglas Bagnall	125	3.5	−1.5
Majority		462	12.9	+6.6
Turnout		3,566	35.7	−30.6
Labour hold				

=== Horwich North East ward ===
Horwich North East ward
Party	Candidate	Votes	%	±%
Labour Co-op	Richard Silvester	1,612	40.9	+11.3
Conservative	Anne Galloway	801	20.3	−4.3
Liberal Democrats	Stephen Rock	795	20.2	+6.6
UKIP	Jeffrey Armstrong	543	13.8	−1.1
Green	Roderick Riesco	193	4.9	+1.2
Majority		811	20.6	+15.4
Turnout		3,944	40.7	−27.1
Labour Co-op hold		Swing	Conservative to Labour Co-op 7.8	

=== Hulton ward ===
Hulton ward
Party	Candidate	Votes	%	±%
Labour	Darren Whitehead	1,374	37.0	+3.3
Conservative	Derek Bullock	1,214	32.7	+1.6
UKIP	Joan Johnson	909	24.5	−4.3
Green	James Tomkinson	122	3.3	+0.1
Liberal Democrats	David Cooper	92	2.5	−0.7
Majority		160	4.3	+1.7
Turnout		3,711	38.4	−25.1
Labour gain from Conservative		Swing	UKIP to Labour 3.8	

=== Kearsley ward ===
Kearsley ward
Party	Candidate	Votes	%	±%
UKIP	Mark Cunningham	1,480	45.2	+13.7
Labour	Carol Burrows	1,248	38.2	+0.6
Conservative	Richard Elliot	300	9.2	−7.8
Liberal Democrats	Aaron Hepworth	243	7.4	−2.1
Majority		232	7.1	
Turnout		3,271	31.8	−27.1
UKIP gain from Labour		Swing	Conservative to UKIP 10.7	

=== Little Lever and Darcy Lever ward ===
Little Lever and Darcy Lever ward
Party	Candidate	Votes	%	±%
UKIP	Rees Gibbons	1,572	39.3	+7.5
Labour	David Evans	1,098	27.4	−3.7
Liberal Democrats	Eric Hyde	813	20.3	+8.2
Conservative	Elizabeth Elliot	429	10.7	−11.2
Green	Edmund Dunsdon	90	2.2	−0.9
Majority		474	7.1	+6.5
Turnout		4,002	42.2	−23.5
UKIP gain from Labour		Swing	Conservative to UKIP 9.3	

=== Rumworth ward ===
Rumworth ward
Party	Candidate	Votes	%	±%
Labour	Rosa Kay	2,568	72.2	−5.1
Conservative	Hafiz Bhutt	373	10.5	−2.1
UKIP	Kathleen Richardson	354	10.0	+10.0
Green	Alan Johnson	179	5.0	−2.7
Liberal Democrats	Christopher Amos	82	2.3	+0.0
Majority		2,195	61.7	−2.9
Turnout		3,556	37.0	−22.0
Labour hold		Swing	Labour to UKIP 7.5	

=== Smithills ward ===
Smithills ward
Party	Candidate	Votes	%	±%
Liberal Democrats	Roger Hayes	2,287	50.8	+14.0
Labour Co-op	John Gillatt	1,152	25.6	−1.9
UKIP	Roy Marsh	546	12.1	−3.6
Conservative	Daniel Haslam	414	9.2	−7.5
Green	Richard Middleshaw	98	2.2	−1.1
Majority		1,134	25.2	+15.3
Turnout		4,498	45.1	−23.0
Liberal Democrats hold		Swing	Conservative to Lib Dem 10.7	

=== Tonge with the Haulgh ward ===
Tonge with the Haulgh ward
Party	Candidate	Votes	%	±%
Labour	Martin Donaghy	1,415	45.9	+3.1
UKIP	Derek Fisher	1,030	33.4	+1.7
Conservative	Jennifer Kirk	448	14.5	−3.8
Liberal Democrats	Michael Langdon	109	3.5	+0.2
Green	Alexander Parkinson	83	2.7	−1.1
Majority		385	12.5	+1.4
Turnout		3,085	35.4	−21.5
Labour hold		Swing	Conservative to Labour 3.4	

=== Westhoughton North and Chew Moor ward ===
Westhoughton North and Chew Moor ward
Party	Candidate	Votes	%	±%
Conservative	Christine Wild	1,600	39.0	
Labour	Anne Graham	1,336	32.5	
UKIP	George Bown	697	17.0	
Liberal Democrats	Derek Gradwell	360	8.8	
Green	Heather Rylance	113	2.8	
Majority		264	6.4	
Turnout		4,106	38.5	−21.5
Conservative gain from Labour				

=== Westhoughton South ward ===
Westhoughton South ward
Party	Candidate	Votes	%	±%
Labour	Anna-Marie Watters	1,123	32.7	−7.0
Liberal Democrats	David Wilkinson	996	29.0	+21.4
Conservative	Lynda Winrow Baker	696	20.3	−8.2
UKIP	Martin Tighe	621	18.1	−2.5
Majority		127	3.7	−7.5
Turnout		3,436	35.8	−28.6
Labour hold		Swing	Conservative to Lib Dem 14.8	
