= 2016 Preston City Council election =

2016 UK local government election

Results of the 2016 Preston City Council election

Elections to Preston City Council took place on 5 May 2016, the same day as other local elections. The council is elected in thirds, which means one councillor from each three-member ward and selected councillors from a number of two-member wards are elected each year, followed by one year free from any elections to ensure all councillors serve a full term.

Due to the "in thirds" system, the 2016 election results below are directly compared with the corresponding elections in 2012, with the change in vote share calculated on this basis.

== Council Composition ==
Prior to the election, the composition of the council was:

↓
32	20	5	1
Labour	Conservative	Lib; Dem	Ind

After the election, the composition was:

↓
33	19	5
Labour	Conservative	Lib; Dem

== Ward results ==
=== Ashton ===
Preston City Council Elections: Ashton ward 2016
Party	Candidate	Votes	%	±%
Labour	Angela Vodden	533	44.6	−10.7
Conservative	Michael Balshaw	394	32.97	−5.93
Liberal Democrats	Mark Jewell	97	8.12	+2.32
UKIP	Graeme Moitie	95	7.95	N/A
Green	Alasdair Bremner	76	6.36	N/A
Majority		139	11.63	
Turnout		1195		

=== Brookfield ===
Preston City Council Elections: Brookfield ward 2016
Party	Candidate	Votes	%	±%
Labour	Philip Corker	793	61.14	−14.46
UKIP	Neil Graham	319	24.6	N/A
Conservative	Daryl Bamber	185	14.26	−10.14
Majority		474	36.55	
Turnout		1,297	−3.85	

=== Cadley ===
Preston City Council Elections: Cadley ward 2016
Party	Candidate	Votes	%	±%
Liberal Democrats	John Potter	1,023	59.86	+9.66
Labour	Suleman Sarwar	312	18.26	−6.54
Conservative	Jim Witherington	231	13.52	−11.48
UKIP	Royston Banks	143	8.37	N/A
Majority		711	41.6	
Turnout		1709	3.74	

=== Deepdale ===
Preston City Council Elections: Deepdale ward 2016
Party	Candidate	Votes	%	±%
Labour	Lynne Wallace	1,150	83.88	+38.78
Conservative	Jonathan Campbell	122	8.90	+7.4
UKIP	Derek Killen	99	7.22	N/A
Majority		1,028	74.98	
Turnout		1,371		
Labour gain from Independent		Swing	{{{swing}}}	

=== Fishwick ===
Preston City Council Elections: Fishwick ward 2016
Party	Candidate	Votes	%	±%
Labour	Martyn Rawlinson	832	84.81	+0.51
Conservative	Emma Fielding	149	15.19	−0.51
Majority		683	69.62	
Turnout		981		

=== Garrison ===
Preston City Council Elections: Garrison ward 2016
Party	Candidate	Votes	%	±%
Conservative	Stuart Greenhalgh	902	50.39	+0.19
Labour	Nweeda Khan	688	38.44	+4.14
Liberal Democrats	Hans Voges	200	11.17	+4.57
Majority		214	11.96	
Turnout		1,790		

=== Greyfriars ===
Preston City Council Elections: Greyfriars ward 2016
Party	Candidate	Votes	%	±%
Conservative	Damien Moore	1,319	58.62	+3.52
Labour	John Wilson	530	23.55	−4.55
Liberal Democrats	Claire Craven	401	17.82	+1.02
Majority		789	35.06	
Turnout		2,250		

=== Ingol ===
Preston City Council Elections: Ingol ward 2016
Party	Candidate	Votes	%	±%
Liberal Democrats	Pauline Brown	860	49.17	+5.87
Labour	John Rochford	372	21.27	−14.23
UKIP	Kieran Aspden	288	16.47	N/A
Conservative	Anthony Smith	229	13.09	−8.11
Majority		488	27.90	
Turnout		1,749		

=== Larches ===
Preston City Council Elections: Larches ward 2016
Party	Candidate	Votes	%	±%
Labour	Mark Yates	793	47.6	−0.6
Liberal Democrats	David Callaghan	332	19.9	−20.9
UKIP	David Dawson	284	17.1	N/A
Conservative	Alice Buchanan	256	15.4	+4.4
Majority		461	27.7	
Turnout		1,665	29.8	

=== Lea ===
Preston City Council Elections: Lea ward 2016
Party	Candidate	Votes	%	±%
Conservative	Trevor Hart	683	43.7	−6.3
Liberal Democrats	Rebecca Potter	374	23.9	−0.04
Labour	Samir Vohra	276	17.7	−8.4
UKIP	Mark Kingsley	229	14.7	N/A
Majority		309	19.8	
Turnout		1,562	33.7	

=== Rural East ===
Preston City Council Elections: Preston Rural East ward 2016
Party	Candidate	Votes	%	±%
Conservative	Thomas Davies	833	70.3	+7.9
Labour	Stephen Smith	352	29.7	+6.7
Majority		481	40.6	
Turnout		1,185	33.8	

=== Rural North ===
Preston City Council Elections: Preston Rural North ward 2016
Party	Candidate	Votes	%	±%
Conservative	Lona Smith	1,358	63.9	
Liberal Democrats	Alex Warren	456	21.4	
Labour	Robert Cross	312	14.7	

=== Ribbleton ===
Preston City Council Elections: Ribbleton ward 2016
Party	Candidate	Votes	%	±%
Labour	Nicholas Pomfret	854	62.2	+4.1
UKIP	Anthony Helps	321	23.4	+23.4
Conservative	Stephen Kay	145	10.6	−1.3
Liberal Democrats	Robert Ash	53	3.9	N/A
Majority		533	38.8	
Turnout		1,373	24.2	

=== Riversway ===
Preston City Council Elections: Riversway ward 2016
Party	Candidate	Votes	%	±%
Labour	Linda Crompton	978	70.0	−10.1
Conservative	Victoria Bamber	171	12.2	+1.7
Green	Alex Walker	128	9.2	+9.2
UKIP	Maureen Watt	120	8.6	N/A
Majority		807	57.8	
Turnout		1,397	34.7	

=== Sharoe Green ===
Preston City Council Elections: Sharoe Green ward 2016
Party	Candidate	Votes	%	±%
Conservative	David Walker	831	44.9	−0.7
Labour	Jonathan Grisdale	676	36.5	−2.6
Liberal Democrats	Greg Vickers	204	11.0	−3.8
Green	Helen Disley	140	7.6	−0.5
Majority		155	8.4	
Turnout		1,851	39.2	

=== St George's ===
There was no election in St George's ward because of an uncontested poll.

=== St Matthew's ===
Preston City Council Elections: St Matthews ward 2016
Party	Candidate	Votes	%	±%
Labour	Jade Morgan	1,018	87.8	−1.5
Conservative	James Shuttleworth	141	12.2	+1.5
Majority		877	75.6	
Turnout		1,159	24.7	

=== Town Centre ===
Preston City Council Elections: Town Centre ward 2016
Party	Candidate	Votes	%	±%
Labour	Drew Gale	1,299	81.4	+37.6
Conservative	Matthew Hargreaves	296	18.6	+10.9
Majority		1,003	62.8	
Turnout		1,595	31.3	

=== Tulketh ===
Preston City Council Elections: Tulketh ward 2016
Party	Candidate	Votes	%	±%
Labour	Matthew Brown	831	61.3	+4.2
UKIP	Andrew Watt	224	16.5	+16.5
Conservative	Bowen Perryman	211	15.6	+4.7
Liberal Democrats	Edward Craven	89	6.6	−23.3
Majority		607	44.8	
Turnout		1,355	27.9	
