= 2016 Redditch Borough Council election =

2016 UK local government election

2016 local election results in Redditch

The 2016 Redditch Borough Council election took place on 5 May 2016 to elect members of Redditch Borough Council in England. This was on the same day as other local elections.

== Results ==
Redditch local election result 2018
Party	Seats	Gains	Losses	Net gain/loss	Seats %	Votes %	Votes	+/−
Labour	15	0	0	0	51.7	39.55	5,876	
Conservative	13	0	0	0	44.8	28.92	4,297	
UKIP	1	0	0	0	3.4	22.75	3,379	
Liberal Democrats	0	0	0	0	0	4.60	683	
Green	0	0	0	0	0	3.92	583	
Independent	0	0	0	0	0	0.26	38	

== Ward results ==
=== Batchley & Brockhill ===
Batchley & Brockhill Ward
Party	Candidate	Votes	%	±%
Labour	Patricia Lailey	714	42.4	
Conservative	Scott Torrington	459	27.2	
UKIP	John Harris	391	23.2	
Green	Steven Pound	63	3.7	
Liberal Democrats	Pamela Gee	58	3.4	
Majority		255	15.2	
Turnout		1,685	28.2	
Labour hold		Swing		

=== Central ===
Central Ward
Party	Candidate	Votes	%	±%
Labour	Greg Chance	673	44.9	
Conservative	Salman Akbar	469	31.3	
UKIP	Trevor Blake	237	15.8	
Liberal Democrats	Diane Thomas	68	4.5	
Green	Thomas Bowes	52	3.5	
Majority		204		
Turnout		1,499	33.9	
Labour hold		Swing		

=== Church Hill ===
Church Hill Ward
Party	Candidate	Votes	%	±%
Labour	Bill Hartnett	837	46.7	
UKIP	Jonathan Oakton	414	23.1	
Conservative	Pamela Williams	374	20.9	
Liberal Democrats	David Gee	79	4.4	
Green	Robert Wardell	50	2.8	
Independent	Agnieszka Wiecek	38	2.1	
Majority		423	23.6	
Turnout		1793	29.7	
Labour hold		Swing		

=== Greenlands ===
Greenlands Ward
Party	Candidate	Votes	%	±%
Labour	Joseph Baker	791	47.0	
UKIP	Christopher Harrison	432	25.7	
Conservative	Abdul Ullah	317	18.8	
Liberal Democrats	Anthony Pitt	91	5.4	
Green	Rylma White	51	3.0	
Majority		359	21.3	
Turnout		1683	26.6	
Labour hold		Swing		

=== Headless Cross & Oakenshaw ===
Headless Cross & Oakenshaw Ward
Party	Candidate	Votes	%	±%
Conservative	Roger Bennett	826	38.8	
Labour	Nayab Patel	559	26.3	
UKIP	Scott Preston	490	23.0	
Liberal Democrats	Rita Hindle	136	6.4	
Green	Alistair Waugh	117	5.5	
Majority		267	12.5	
Turnout		2128	31.8	
Conservative hold		Swing		

=== Lodge Park ===
Lodge Park Ward
Party	Candidate	Votes	%	±%
Labour	Mark Shurmer	646	55.6	
UKIP	Leslie Rogers	237	20.4	
Conservative	Craig Warhurst	197	17.0	
Liberal Democrats	Ian Webster	44	3.8	
Green	Kevin White	38	3.3	
Majority		409	35.2	
Turnout		1162	30.2	
Labour hold		Swing		

=== Matchborough ===
Matchborough Ward
Party	Candidate	Votes	%	±%
Labour	John Fisher	590	40.3	
Conservative	Alexandra Williams	464	31.7	
UKIP	James Swansborough	300	20.5	
Liberal Democrats	Simon Oliver	66	4.5	
Green	Louise Deveney	44	3.0	
Majority		126	8.6	
Turnout		1464	32.1	
Labour hold		Swing		

=== West ===
West Ward
Party	Candidate	Votes	%	±%
Conservative	Matthew Dormer	682	48.4	
Labour	Michael Lewington	325	23.1	
UKIP	Julie Walford	251	17.8	
Green	Simon Venables	92	6.5	
Liberal Democrats	Russell Taylor	58	4.1	
Majority		357	25.4	
Turnout		1407	32.2	
Conservative hold		Swing		

=== Winyates ===
Winyates Ward
Party	Candidate	Votes	%	±%
Labour	Yvonne Smith	741	36.4	
UKIP	Kathleen Haslam	627	30.8	
Conservative	John Hyams	509	25.0	
Liberal Democrats	Johann Windheuser	83	4.1	
Green	Emma Bradley	76	3.7	
Majority		114	5.6	
Turnout		2036	32.6	
Labour hold		Swing		
