= 2016 Walsall Metropolitan Borough Council election =

2016 local election in England

Map of the results

The 2016 Walsall Metropolitan Borough Council election took place on 5 May 2016 to elect members of Walsall Metropolitan Borough Council in England. This was on the same day as other local elections.

== Results summary ==
Party	Seats Prior	Seats After
Labour	27	28
Conservatives	25	25
Liberal Democrats	2	2
UKIP	3	3
Independent	3	2
Total	60	60

== Ward results ==
=== Aldridge Central and South ===
Aldridge Central and South
Party	Candidate	Votes	%	±%
Conservative	Tim Wilson	1,986	56.65	▲6.77
UKIP	Colin Hayward	709	20.22	▲4.13
Labour	Balvir Dhillon	575	16.40	▼6.48
Liberal Democrats	Roy Sherward	236	6.73	▼4.41
Majority		1,277	36.42	
Turnout		3,506	32.29	
Total votes		3,534	32.54	
Registered electors		10,859		
Conservative hold		Swing		
