= 2016 Broxbourne Borough Council election =

2016 UK local government election

The 2016 Broxbourne Borough Council election took place on 5 May 2016 to elect members of Broxbourne Borough Council in England. This was on the same day as other local elections.

== Results ==
2016 Broxbourne Borough Council election
Party	Seats	Gains	Losses	Net gain/loss	Seats %	Votes %	Votes	+/−
Conservative	9					54.92	10,336	
Labour	1					26.07	4,905	
UKIP	0					18.29	3,441	
Green	0					0.72	137	

== Ward results ==
=== Broxbourne and Hoddesdon South ===
Broxbourne and Hoddesdon South
Party	Candidate	Votes	%	±%
Conservative	David William Holliday	1,422	62.81	
UKIP	Evelyn Faulkner	375	16.56	
Labour	Kathy Condon	330	14.58	
Green	Robert Roland Hyde	137	6.05	
Majority		1,047	46.25	
Turnout		2,264	31.13	
Conservative hold		Swing		

=== Cheshunt North ===
Cheshunt North
Party	Candidate	Votes	%	±%
Conservative	Linda Joy Russell	1,176	67.28	
Labour	Tony Renwick	572	32.72	
Majority		604	34.56	
Turnout		1,748	26.59	
Conservative hold		Swing		

=== Cheshunt South and Theobalds ===
Cheshunt South and Theobalds
Party	Candidate	Votes	%	±%
Conservative	Carol Ann Crump	891	49.81	
Labour	Ian Martin Charles Dust	504	28.17	
UKIP	Mavis Clark	394	22.02	
Majority		387	21.64	
Turnout		1,789	27.13	
Conservative hold		Swing		

=== Flamstead End ===
Flamstead End
Party	Candidate	Votes	%	±%
Conservative	Dee Hart	1,021	58.14	
UKIP	Shirley Pratt	412	23.46	
Labour	Errol George Lawrence	323	18.40	
Majority		609	34.68	
Turnout		1,756	25.82	
Conservative hold		Swing		

=== Goffs Oak ===
Goffs Oak
Party	Candidate	Votes	%	±%
Conservative	Jeremy Pearce	1,198	65.90	
UKIP	Steve Coster	380	20.90	
Labour	Gillian Mary Lawrence	240	13.20	
Majority		818	45.00	
Turnout		1,818	26.05	
Conservative hold		Swing		

=== Hoddesdon North ===
Hoddesdon North
Party	Candidate	Votes	%	±%
Conservative	Keith Martin Brown	1,140	56.30	
UKIP	Tony Faulkner	504	24.89	
Labour	Ed Hopwood	381	18.81	
Majority		636	31.41	
Turnout		2,025	27.27	
Conservative hold		Swing		

=== Hoddesdon Town and Rye Park ===
Hoddesdon Town and Rye Park
Party	Candidate	Votes	%	±%
Conservative	Ken Ayling	761	45.49	
Labour	Mark Hall	459	27.43	
UKIP	Sidney Pratt	453	27.08	
Majority		302	18.06	
Turnout		1,673	24.20	
Conservative hold		Swing		

=== Rosedale and Bury Green ===
Rosedale and Bury Green
Party	Candidate	Votes	%	±%
Conservative	Darren Richard Pitcher	793	45.34	
Labour	Selina Elizabeth Norgrove	483	27.62	
UKIP	Cliff Hunt	473	27.04	
Majority		310	17.72	
Turnout		1,749	26.35	
Conservative hold		Swing		

=== Waltham Cross ===
Waltham Cross
Party	Candidate	Votes	%	±%
Labour	Malcolm David Aitken	1,205	55.53	
Conservative	Patsy Spears	965	44.47	
Majority		240	11.06	
Turnout		2,170	29.61	
Labour hold		Swing		

=== Wormley and Turnford ===
Wormley and Turnford
Party	Candidate	Votes	%	±%
Conservative	Lewis Christopher Cocking	969	53.04	
UKIP	Dawn Bloor	450	24.63	
Labour	Kehinde Osifuwa	408	22.33	
Majority		519	28.41	
Turnout		1,827	23.23	
Conservative hold		Swing		
