= 2016 United Kingdom local elections =

- 5 May 2016

124 of 405 councils in England 4 directly elected mayors 40 Police and Crime Commissioners
- Turnout: 34%
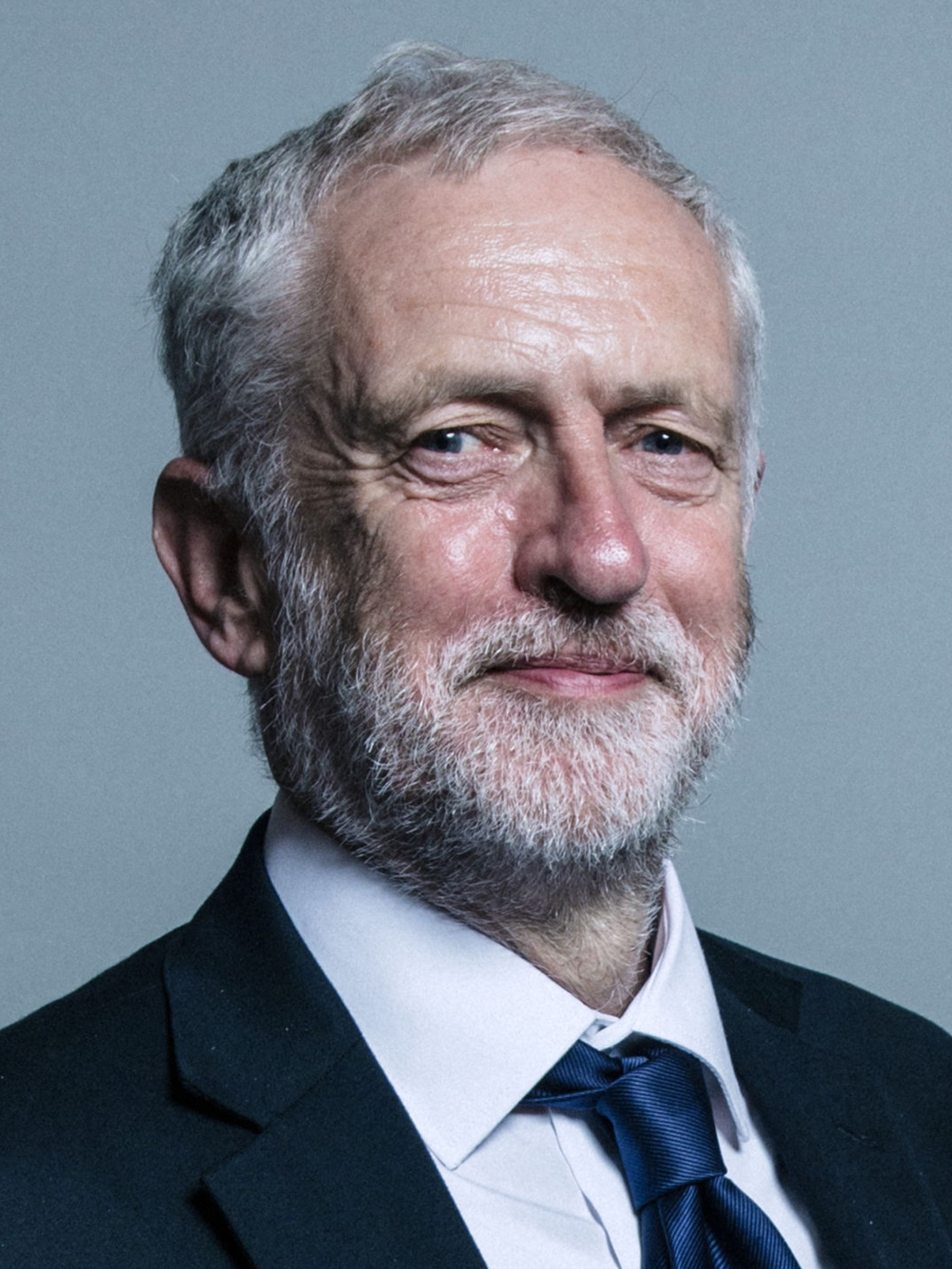

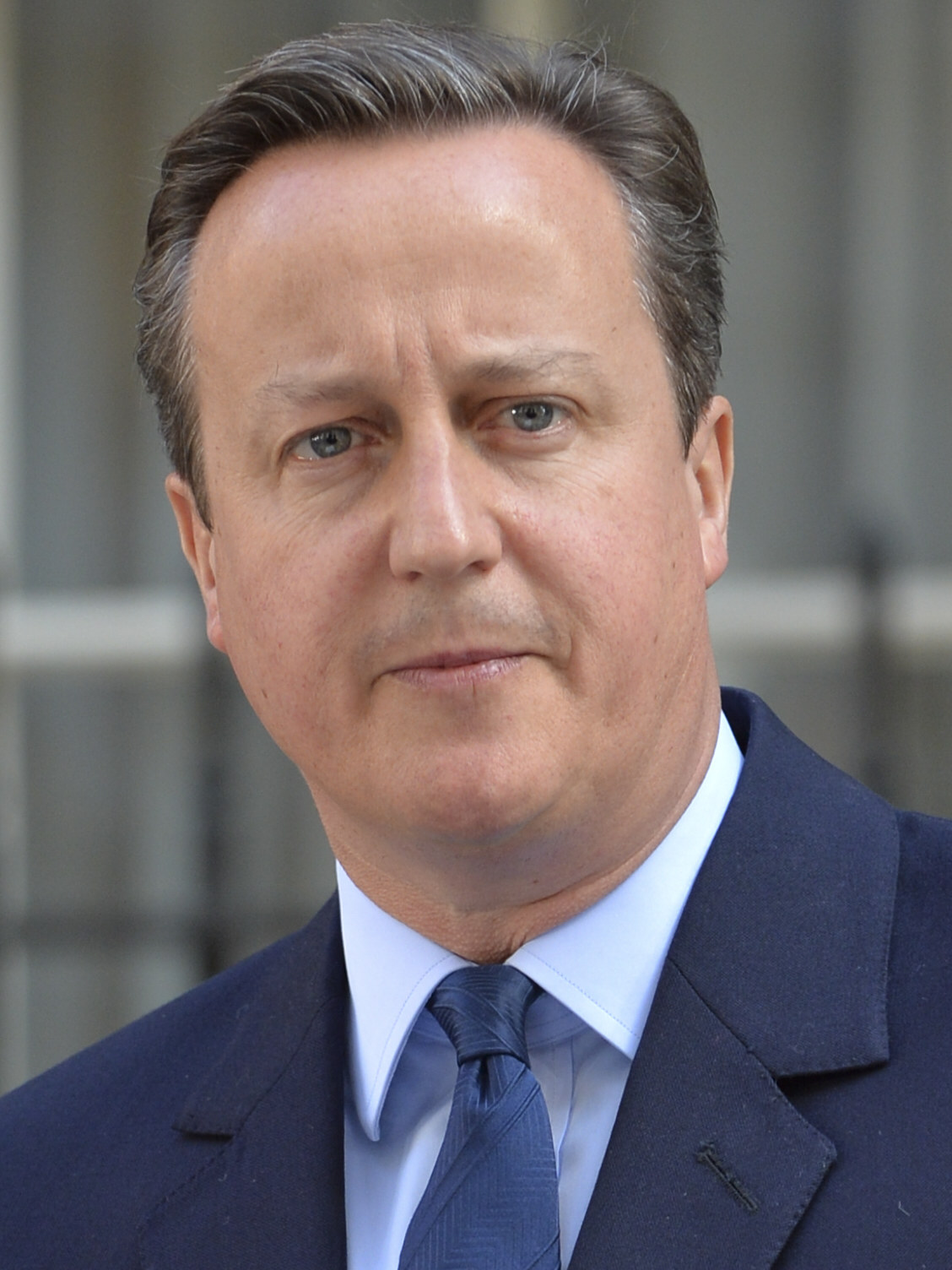

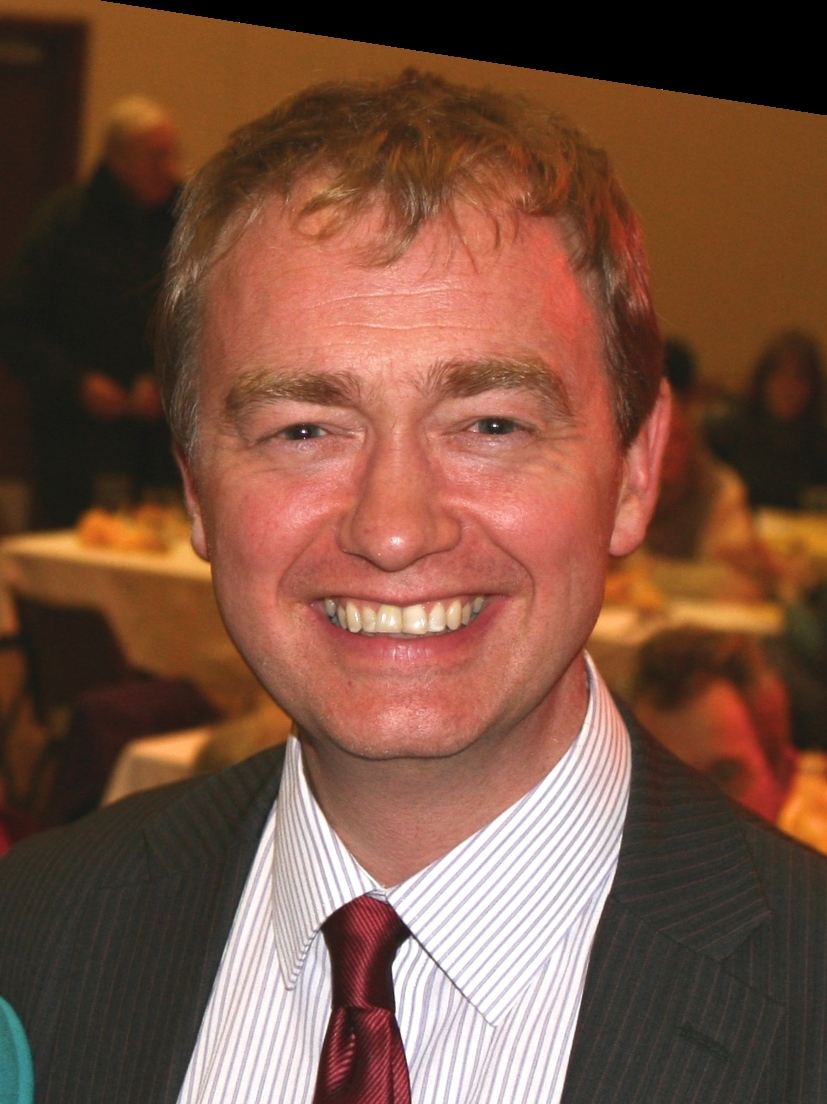

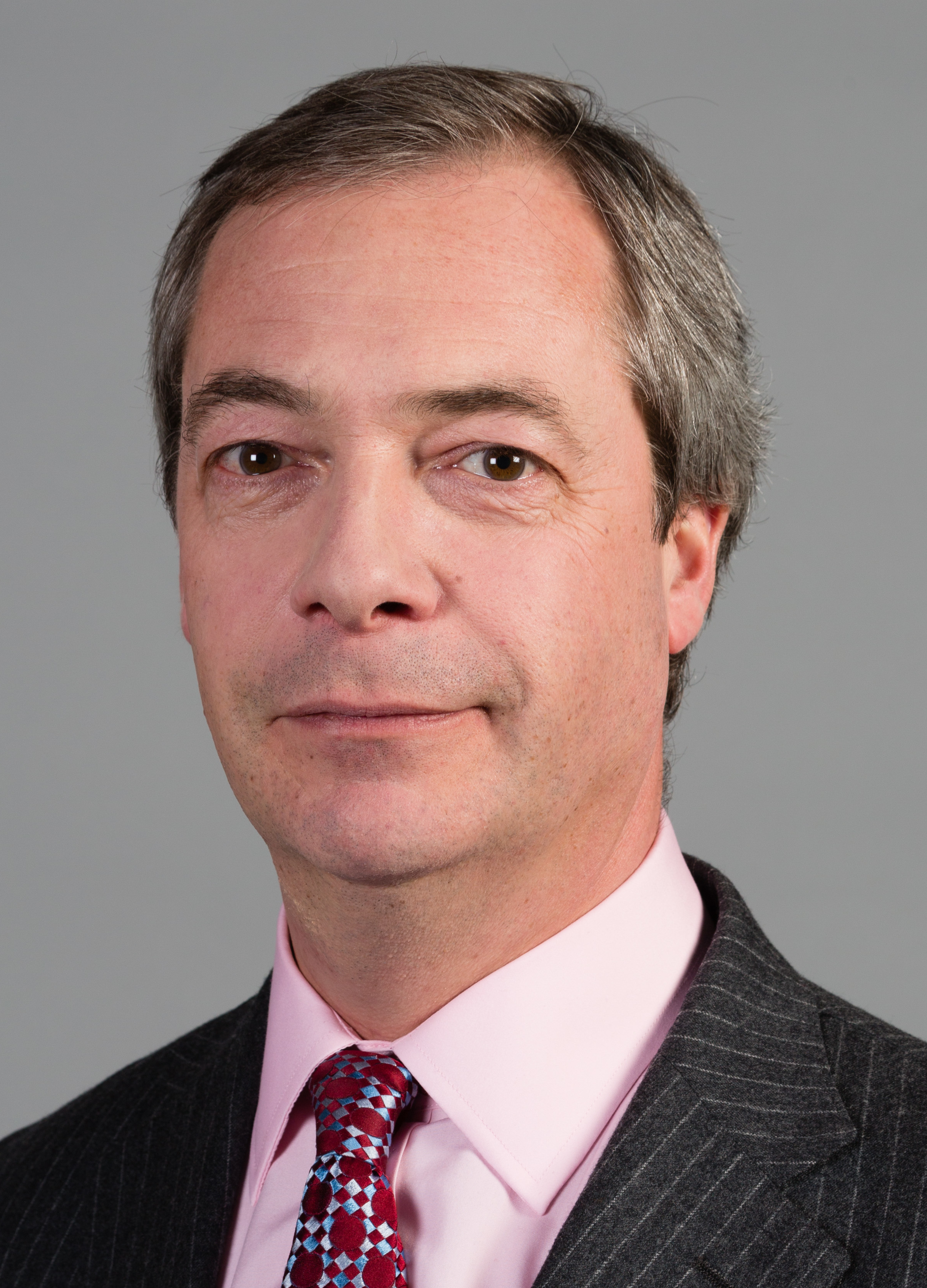
	First party	Second party
Leader	Jeremy Corbyn	David Cameron
Party	Labour	Conservative
Leader since	12 September 2015	6 December 2005
Seats before	6,884 seats 114 councils	8,779 seats 192 councils
Projected vote share (Note: All vote shares in the infobox are projected national vote shares calculated by the BBC.)	31% ▲2%	30% ▼5%
Seats won (2016)	1,326; 48 councils	842; 38 councils
Councillors (after)	6,881; 114 councils	8,707; 191 councils
Net change (notional)	▼18; 0 councils	▼48 ▼1 councils
	Third party	Fourth party
Leader	Tim Farron	Nigel Farage
Party	Liberal Democrats	UKIP
Leader since	16 July 2015	5 November 2010
Seats before	1,812 seats 6 councils	490 seats 1 council
Projected vote share	15% ▲4%	12% ▼1%
Seats won (2016)	378; 4 councils	58; 0 councils
Councillors (after)	1,834; 7 councils	495; 1 council
Net change (notional)	▲45 ▲1 councils	▲25; 0 councils
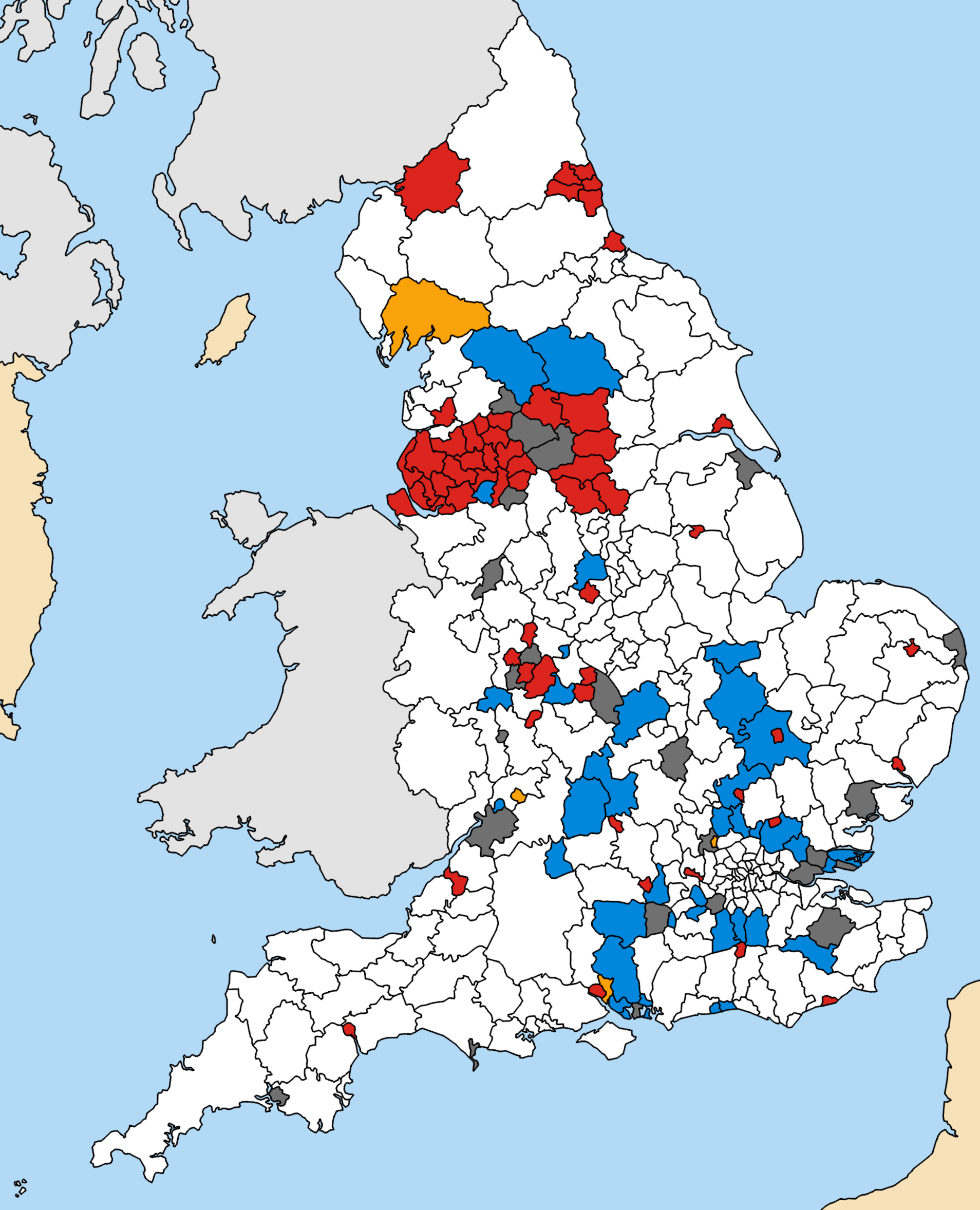
- Council control following the 2016 local elections in England. Conservative Labour Liberal Democrats No overall control No election in 2016

The 2016 United Kingdom local elections held on Thursday 5 May 2016 were a series of local elections which were held in 124 local councils and also saw 4 mayoral elections in England which also coincided with elections to the Scottish Parliament, the Welsh Assembly, the Northern Ireland Assembly, the London Assembly, the London mayoral election and the England and Wales Police and crime commissioners. By-elections for the Westminster seats of Ogmore and Sheffield Brightside and Hillsborough were also held. These proved to be David Cameron's last local elections as leader of the Conservative Party and Prime Minister as he resigned two months later following the defeat of Remain in the referendum on Britain's continuing membership of the European Union which was held seven weeks later.

== Results ==
Full results as reported by BBC News.

Party	Councillors			Councils		
Party	Won	After	+/- (Note: Because the number of council seats shifts every year due to boundary changes and local government reorganisation, changes are notional changes calculated by the BBC.)	Won	After	+/-
Conservative	842	8,707	▼48	38	191	▼1
Labour	1,326	6,881	▼18	48	114	Steady
Liberal Democrats	378	1,834	▲45	4	7	▲1
UKIP	58	495	▲25	0	1	Steady
SNP	—N/a (Note: There were no elections in Scotland in 2016.)	418	Steady	0	2	Steady
Green	45	177	▼3	0	0	Steady
Plaid Cymru	—N/a (Note: There were no elections in Wales in 2016.)	171	Steady	0	0	Steady
Independent	120	1,545	▼1	0	6	Steady
No overall control	—N/a			24	85	Steady
Total	2,769	20,228	—	114	405	—

As these local elections were held in 124 English councils, out of 418 in the whole of the UK, the BBC calculated a Projected National Vote Share (PNV), which aims to assess what the council results indicate the UK-wide vote would be "if the results were repeated at a general election".

The BBC's Projected National Vote Share was 31% for Labour, 30% for the Conservatives, 15% for the Liberal Democrats and 12% for UKIP. These results are included in the infobox for this article. Longstanding elections analysts Colin Rallings and Michael Thrasher of Plymouth University estimate a National Equivalent Vote (NEV) share, and in 2016 put Labour on 33%, the Conservatives on 31%, the Liberal Democrats on 14% and UKIP on 12%.

=== Analysis ===
David Cameron celebrated the results, stating that his party did well despite being in office for six years up to that point. The results were viewed as mixed or poor for Labour. Jeremy Corbyn claimed that the results were better than anticipated, given that Labour was expected to lose more councillors and councils. The Liberal Democrats failed to win back areas where they lost seats in prior elections, though they did make a slight recovery after heavy losses in 2015. UKIP was also assessed to have underperformed, given its association with the upcoming 2016 United Kingdom European Union membership referendum.

== Metropolitan boroughs ==
=== Whole metropolitan council ===
Three of 36 metropolitan boroughs had all of their seats up for election.

Council	Previous control	Result	Details
Knowsley	Labour	Labour	Details
Rotherham	Labour	Labour	Details
Sheffield	Labour	Labour	Details

==== One-third of metropolitan council ====
32 of 36 metropolitan boroughs had one-third of their seats up for election.

Council	Previous control	Result	Details
Barnsley	Labour	Labour	Details
Birmingham	Labour	Labour	Details
Bolton	Labour	Labour	Details
Bradford	Labour	Labour	Details
Bury	Labour	Labour	Details
Calderdale	No overall control (Labour minority)	No overall control (Labour minority)	Details
Coventry	Labour	Labour	Details
Dudley	Labour	No overall control (Labour minority)	Details
Gateshead	Labour	Labour	Details
Kirklees	No overall control (Labour minority)	No overall control (Labour minority)	Details
Leeds	Labour	Labour	Details
Liverpool	Labour	Labour	Details
Manchester	Labour	Labour	Details
Newcastle upon Tyne	Labour	Labour	Details
North Tyneside	Labour	Labour	Details
Oldham	Labour	Labour	Details
Rochdale	Labour	Labour	Details
St Helens	Labour	Labour	Details
Salford	Labour	Labour	Details
Sandwell	Labour	Labour	Details
Sefton	Labour	Labour	Details
Solihull	Conservative	Conservative	Details
South Tyneside	Labour	Labour	Details
Stockport	No overall control (Lib Dem–Ind minority)	No overall control (Labour minority)	Details
Sunderland	Labour	Labour	Details
Tameside	Labour	Labour	Details
Trafford	Conservative	Conservative	Details
Wakefield	Labour	Labour	Details
Walsall	No overall control (Con–UKIP–Ind)	No overall control (Lab–Lib Dem)	Details
Wigan	Labour	Labour	Details
Wirral	Labour	Labour	Details
Wolverhampton	Labour	Labour	Details

== Unitary authorities ==
=== Whole unitary council ===
3 unitary authorities had all of their seats up for election.

Council	Previous control	Result	Details
Bristol	No overall control (Labour minority)	Labour	Details
Peterborough	No overall control (Con minority)	Conservative	Details
Warrington	Labour	Labour	Details

=== One-third of unitary council ===
16 unitary authorities had one-third of their seats up for election.

Council	Previous control	Result	Details
Blackburn with Darwen	Labour	Labour	Details
Derby	Labour	Labour	Details
Halton	Labour	Labour	Details
Hartlepool	Labour	Labour	Details
Kingston upon Hull	Labour	Labour	Details
Milton Keynes	No overall control (Lab minority)	No overall control (Lab-LibDem Coalition)	Details
North East Lincolnshire	No overall control (Lab minority)	No overall control (Lab minority)	Details
Plymouth	No overall control (Lab–Con coalition)	No overall control (Con-UKIP coalition)	Details
Portsmouth	No overall control (Con with UKIP support)	No overall control (Con minority)	Details
Reading	Labour	Labour	Details
Slough	Labour	Labour	Details
Southampton	Labour	Labour	Details
Southend-on-Sea	No overall control (Ind–Lab–Lib Dem coalition)	No overall control (Con minority)	Details
Swindon	Conservative	Conservative	Details
Thurrock	No overall control (Lab minority)	No overall control (Con minority)	Details
Wokingham	Conservative	Conservative	Details

== District Councils ==
=== Whole district councils ===
12 District Councils had all of their seats up for election.

Council	Previous control	Result	Details
Cherwell	Conservative	Conservative	Details
Colchester	No overall control (Lib Dem–Lab–Ind coalition)	No overall control (Lib Dem-Lab-Ind coalition)	Details
Elmbridge	Conservative	No overall control (Residents-Lib Dem coalition)	Details
Exeter	Labour	Labour	Details
Gloucester	Conservative	Conservative	Details
Lincoln	Labour	Labour	Details
Rochford	Conservative	Conservative	Details
Stroud	No overall control (Lab–Green–Lib Dem coalition)	No overall control (Lab-Green-Lib Dem coalition)	Details
Watford	No overall control (Lib Dem minority)	Liberal Democrats	Details
Welwyn Hatfield	Conservative	Conservative	Details
Winchester	Conservative	Conservative	Details
Woking	Conservative	Conservative	Details

=== Half of councils ===
7 non-metropolitan district councils had half of their seats up for election.

Council	Previous control	Result	Details
Adur	Conservative	Conservative	Details
Cheltenham	Liberal Democrats	Liberal Democrats	Details
Fareham	Conservative	Conservative	Details
Gosport	Conservative	Conservative	Details
Hastings	Labour	Labour	Details
Nuneaton and Bedworth	Labour	Labour	Details
Oxford	Labour	Labour	Details

=== One-third of district councils ===
51 non-metropolitan district councils had one-third of their seats up for election.

Council	Previous control	Result	Details
Amber Valley	Conservative	Conservative	Details
Basildon	No overall control (Con minority)	No overall control (Con minority)	Details
Basingstoke and Deane	Conservative	Conservative	Details
Brentwood	Conservative	Conservative	Details
Broxbourne	Conservative	Conservative	Details
Burnley	Labour	Labour	Details
Cambridge	Labour	Labour	Details
Cannock Chase	Labour	Labour	Details
Carlisle	Labour	Labour	Details
Castle Point	Conservative	Conservative	Details
Chorley	Labour	Labour	Details
Craven	Conservative	Conservative	Details
Crawley	Labour	Labour	Details
Daventry	Conservative	Conservative	Details
Eastleigh	Liberal Democrats	Liberal Democrats	Details
Epping Forest	Conservative	Conservative	Details
Great Yarmouth	No overall control (Con minority)	No overall control (Con minority)	Details
Harlow	Labour	Labour	Details
Harrogate	Conservative	Conservative	Details
Hart	No overall control (Con minority)	No overall control (Con minority)	Details
Havant	Conservative	Conservative	Details
Huntingdonshire	Conservative	Conservative	Details
Hyndburn	Labour	Labour	Details
Ipswich	Labour	Labour	Details
Maidstone	No overall control (Lib Dem–Ind minority)	No overall control (Lib Dem-Ind minority)	Details
Mole Valley	Conservative	Conservative	Details
Newcastle-under-Lyme	No overall control (Lab minority)	No overall control (Lab minority)	Details
North Hertfordshire	Conservative	Conservative	Details
Norwich	Labour	Labour	Details
Pendle	No overall control (Labour–Lib Dem coalition)	No overall control (Labour–Lib Dem coalition)	Details
Preston	Labour	Labour	Details
Redditch	Labour	Labour	Details
Reigate and Banstead	Conservative	Conservative	Details
Rossendale	Labour	Labour	Details
Rugby	No overall control (Con minority)	No overall control (Con minority)	Details
Runnymede	Conservative	Conservative	Details
Rushmoor	Conservative	Conservative	Details
St Albans	Conservative	Conservative	Details
South Cambridgeshire	Conservative	Conservative	Details
South Lakeland	Liberal Democrats	Liberal Democrats	Details
Stevenage	Labour	Labour	Details
Tamworth	Conservative	Conservative	Details
Tandridge	Conservative	Conservative	Details
Three Rivers	No overall control (Lib Dem minority)	No overall control (Lib Dem minority)	Details
Tunbridge Wells	Conservative	Conservative	Details
West Lancashire	Labour	Labour	Details
West Oxfordshire	Conservative	Conservative	Details
Weymouth and Portland	No overall control (Con minority)	No overall control (Con minority)	Details
Worcester	Conservative	No overall control (Lab minority)	Details
Worthing	Conservative	Conservative	Details
Wyre Forest	Conservative	Conservative	Details

== Mayoral elections ==
Four direct mayoral elections were held.

Local Authority	Previous Mayor	Mayor-elect	Details
London	Boris Johnson (Conservative)	Sadiq Khan (Labour)	Details
Bristol	George Ferguson (Bristol 1st)	Marvin Rees (Labour)	Details
Liverpool	Joe Anderson (Labour)	Joe Anderson (Labour)	Details
Salford	Ian Stewart (Labour)	Paul Dennett (Labour)	Details

== Police and Crime Commissioner elections ==
40 elections for Police and Crime Commissioners were held.

=== Results - English PCC Elections ===
Party	Votes (Note: The Police and Crime Commissioner elections operate under a system called the Supplementary Vote, where voters can cast a first and second preference. First preference votes are the 'popular vote' recorded here)	%	PCCs	%
Labour	2,719,315	34.3%	15	32.4%
Conservative	2,390,678	30.2%	20	58.8%
UKIP	1,169,314	14.8%	0	0%
Liberal Democrats	721,148	9.1%	0	0%
Independent	618,688	7.8%	3	8.8%
Zero Tolerance Policing	120,720	1.5%	0	0%
Green	113,957	1.4%	0	0%
English Democrat	54,680	0.7%	0	0%
Lincolnshire Independent	18,497	0.2%	0	0%

=== Results Breakdown ===
Police Force Area	Previous Commissioner	Commissioner-elect
Avon and Somerset	Sue Mountstevens (Independent)	Sue Mountstevens (Independent)
Bedfordshire	Olly Martins (Labour Co-op)	Kathryn Holloway (Conservative)
Cambridgeshire	Sir Graham Bright (Conservative)	Jason Ablewhite (Conservative)
Cheshire	John Dwyer (Conservative)	David Keane (Labour)
Cleveland	Barry Coppinger (Labour)	Barry Coppinger (Labour)
Cumbria	Richard Rhodes (Conservative)	Peter McCall (Conservative)
Derbyshire	Alan Charles (Labour)	Hardyal Dhindsa (Labour)
Devon and Cornwall	Tony Hogg (Conservative)	Alison Hernandez (Conservative)
Dorset	Martyn Underhill (Independent)	Martyn Underhill (Independent)
Durham	Ron Hogg (Labour)	Ron Hogg (Labour)
Essex	Nick Alston (Conservative)	Roger Hirst (Conservative)
Gloucestershire	Martin Surl (Independent)	Martin Surl (Independent)
Hampshire	Simon Hayes (Independent)	Michael Lane (Conservative)
Hertfordshire	David Lloyd (Conservative)	David Lloyd (Conservative)
Humberside	Matthew Grove (Conservative)	Keith Hunter (Labour Co-op)
Kent Police	Ann Barnes (Independent)	Matthew Scott (Conservative)
Lancashire	Clive Grunshaw (Labour)	Clive Grunshaw (Labour)
Leicestershire	Sir Clive Loader (Conservative)	Willy Bach (Labour)
Lincolnshire Police	Alan Hardwick (Independent)	Marc Jones (Conservative)
Merseyside	Jane Kennedy (Labour)	Jane Kennedy (Labour)
Norfolk	Stephen Bett (Independent)	Lorne Green (Conservative)
North Yorkshire	Julia Mulligan (Conservative)	Julia Mulligan (Conservative)
Northamptonshire	Adam Simmonds (Conservative)	Stephen Mold (Conservative)
Northumbria	Vera Baird (Labour)	Vera Baird (Labour)
Nottinghamshire	Paddy Tipping (Labour)	Paddy Tipping (Labour)
South Yorkshire	Alan Billings (Labour)	Alan Billings (Labour)
Staffordshire	Matthew Ellis (Conservative)	Matthew Ellis (Conservative)
Suffolk	Tim Passmore (Conservative)	Tim Passmore (Conservative)
Surrey	Kevin Hurley (Independent)	David Munro (Conservative)
Sussex	Katy Bourne (Conservative)	Katy Bourne (Conservative)
Thames Valley	Anthony Stansfeld (Conservative)	Anthony Stansfeld (Conservative)
Warwickshire	Ron Ball (Independent)	Philip Seccombe (Conservative)
West Mercia Police	Bill Longmore (Independent)	John-Paul Campion (Conservative)
West Midlands	David Jamieson (Labour)	David Jamieson (Labour)
West Yorkshire	Mark Burns-Williamson (Labour)	Mark Burns-Williamson (Labour)
Wiltshire	Angus Macpherson (Conservative)	Angus Macpherson (Conservative)

=== Results - Welsh PCC Elections ===
Party	Votes	%	PCCs
Labour	328,113	34.1%	2
Plaid Cymru	228,334	23.7%	2
Conservative	210,882	21.9%	0
Independent	102,502	10.7%	0
UKIP	46,813	4.9%	0
Liberal Democrats	45,163	4.7%	0

=== Results Breakdown ===
Police Force Area	Previous Commissioner	Commissioner-elect
Dyfed-Powys	Christopher Salmon (Conservative)	Dafydd Llywelyn (Plaid Cymru)
Gwent	Ian Johnston (Independent)	Jeffrey Cuthbert (Labour Co-op)
North Wales	Winston Roddick (Independent)	Arfon Jones (Plaid Cymru)
South Wales	Alun Michael (Labour Co-op)	Alun Michael (Labour Co-op)

== See also ==
=== Other elections being held in the UK on the same day ===
- 2016 London Assembly election
- 2016 London mayoral election
- 2016 National Assembly for Wales election
- 2016 Northern Ireland Assembly election
- 2016 Scottish Parliament election
- 2016 Ogmore by-election
- 2016 Sheffield Brightside and Hillsborough by-election
