= 2016 Elmbridge Borough Council election =

2016 UK local government election

Results of the 2016 Elmbridge Borough Council election

The 2016 Elmbridge Borough Council election took place on 5 May 2016 to elect members of Elmbridge Borough Council in England. This was on the same day as other local elections. This election was held on new boundaries, with every seat up for election.

== Ward results ==
=== Claygate ===
Claygate
Party	Candidate	Votes	%	±%
Liberal Democrats	Mary Marshall	1,654	63.1	
Liberal Democrats	Alex Coomes	1,469	56.0	
Liberal Democrats	Kim Cross	1,271	48.5	
Conservative	Mark Sugden	964	36.8	
Conservative	Geoff Herbert	772	29.4	
Conservative	Xingang Wang	585	22.3	
Labour	Felix Riley	305	11.6	
UKIP	Bernard Collignon	197	7.5	
Majority				
Turnout		2,624	47.3	
Liberal Democrats win (new seat)				
Liberal Democrats win (new seat)				
Liberal Democrats win (new seat)				

=== Cobham and Downside ===
Cobham and Downside
Party	Candidate	Votes	%	±%
Conservative	Mike Bennison	1,157	58.5	
Conservative	Dorothy Mitchell	1,155	58.4	
Conservative	James Browne	1,043	52.7	
Liberal Democrats	David Bellchamber	593	30.0	
UKIP	Elaine Kingston	378	19.1	
Labour	Lana Hylands	370	18.7	
Majority				
Turnout		1,982	30.8	
Conservative win (new seat)				
Conservative win (new seat)				
Conservative win (new seat)				

=== Esher ===
Esher
Party	Candidate	Votes	%	±%
Conservative	David Archer	1,118	44.9	
Conservative	Timothy Oliver	1,056	42.4	
Esher Residents' Association	Peter Heaney	1,020	41.0	
Esher Residents' Association	Sue Citron	978	39.3	
Conservative	Simon Waugh	935	37.6	
Esher Residents' Association	Joyce Keen	791	31.8	
Hersham Village Society	Terry Duhig	371	14.9	
Green	Laura Harmour	304	12.2	
Majority				
Turnout		2,495	38.5	
Conservative win (new seat)				
Conservative win (new seat)				
Residents win (new seat)				

=== Hersham Village ===
Hersham Village
Party	Candidate	Votes	%	±%
Hersham Village Society	Hersham Green	1,111	45.6	
Conservative	Mary Sheldon	1,051	43.1	
Hersham Village Society	Anne Hill	904	37.1	
Conservative	Michael O'Reilly	875	35.9	
Conservative	Florence Mitchell	770	31.6	
Green	Olivia Palmer	508	20.9	
Labour	Peter Jepson	419	17.2	
Liberal Democrats	Janet Shell	325	13.3	
UKIP	Nicholas Wood	278	11.4	
Majority				
Turnout		2,439	39.5	
Residents win (new seat)				
Conservative win (new seat)				
Residents win (new seat)				

=== Hinchley Wood and Weston Green ===
Hinchley Wood and Weston Green
Party	Candidate	Votes	%	±%
Hinchley Wood / Weston Green Residents' Associations	Tannia Shipley	1,950	75.6	
Hinchley Wood / Weston Green Residents' Associations	Janet Turner	1,906	73.8	
Hinchley Wood / Weston Green Residents' Associations	Nigel Haig-Brown	1,861	72.1	
Conservative	Charlotte Sharman	465	18.0	
Conservative	Martin Fox	459	17.8	
Conservative	Craig Harrison	441	17.1	
Majority				
Turnout		2,587	40.2	
Residents win (new seat)				
Residents win (new seat)				
Residents win (new seat)				

=== Long Ditton ===
Long Ditton
Party	Candidate	Votes	%	±%
Liberal Democrats	Shweta Kapadia	1,304	63.7	
Liberal Democrats	Neil Houston	1,275	62.3	
Liberal Democrats	Barry Fairbank	1,203	58.8	
Conservative	Jerry Mills	636	31.1	
Conservative	Natasha Odone	434	21.2	
Conservative	Derek Williamson	413	20.2	
UKIP	Redvers Cunningham	259	12.7	
Majority				
Turnout		2,059	38.7	
Liberal Democrats win (new seat)				
Liberal Democrats win (new seat)				
Liberal Democrats win (new seat)				

=== Molesey East ===
Molesey East
Party	Candidate	Votes	%	±%
Molesey Residents' Association	Stuart Selleck	1,576	53.4	
Molesey Residents' Association	Ivan Regan	1,517	51.4	
Molesey Residents' Association	Tony Popham	1,437	48.7	
Conservative	Steve Bax	1,159	39.3	
Conservative	Peter Szanto	925	31.3	
Conservative	Debi Oliver	888	30.1	
Green	Sarah Spencer-Bowdage	314	10.6	
Labour	Surraya Sumner	314	10.6	
UKIP	Trevor Marshall	199	6.7	
Majority				
Turnout		2,963	43.9	
Residents win (new seat)				
Residents win (new seat)				
Residents win (new seat)				

=== Molesey West ===
Molesey West
Party	Candidate	Votes	%	±%
Molesey Residents' Association	Mike Axton	1,627	70.9	
Molesey Residents' Association	Vic Eldridge	1,583	69.0	
Molesey Residents' Association	Ruby Ahmed	1,481	64.5	
Conservative	Richard Doxford	320	13.9	
Labour	Jamal Ajjane	304	13.2	
Conservative	Philippe Bassett	260	11.3	
Liberal Democrats	Paul Nagle	189	8.2	
Conservative	Inna Spektor	183	8.0	
Majority				
Turnout		2,301	33.9	
Residents win (new seat)				
Residents win (new seat)				
Residents win (new seat)				

=== Oatlands and Burwood Park ===
Oatlands and Burwood Park
Party	Candidate	Votes	%	±%
Conservative	Glenn Dearlove	1,462	72.2	
Conservative	Lewis Brown	1,410	69.6	
Conservative	Barry Cheyne	1,389	68.6	
Labour	Elinor Jones	352	17.4	
Labour	Martin Lister	347	17.1	
UKIP	Simon Kadwill	288	14.2	
Labour	Irene Threlkeld	278	13.7	
Majority				
Turnout		2,042	34.3	
Conservative win (new seat)				
Conservative win (new seat)				
Conservative win (new seat)				

=== Oxshott and Stoke D'Abernon ===
Oxshott and Stoke D'Abernon
Party	Candidate	Votes	%	±%
Conservative	Oliver Chappell	1,497	71.3	
Conservative	James Vickers	1,474	70.2	
Conservative	Andrew Burley	1,474	70.2	
Liberal Democrats	Simon Davies	366	17.4	
UKIP	Richard Atkins	263	12.5	
UKIP	Philip Birch	261	12.4	
Labour	Hugh Bryant	232	11.0	
Majority				
Turnout		2,102	32.9	
Conservative win (new seat)				
Conservative win (new seat)				
Conservative win (new seat)				

=== Thames Ditton ===
Thames Ditton
Party	Candidate	Votes	%	±%
Thames Ditton / Weston Green Residents' Association	Tricia Bland	1,664	72.0	
Thames Ditton / Weston Green Residents' Association	Joanna Randolph	1,647	71.3	
Thames Ditton / Weston Green Residents' Association	Ruth Lyon	1,636	70.8	
Conservative	Mandy Sansom	474	20.5	
Conservative	Graham West	423	18.3	
Conservative	Andrew Reid	381	16.5	
Liberal Democrats	Jaska Alanko	257	11.1	
Majority				
Turnout		2,337	36.9	
Residents win (new seat)				
Residents win (new seat)				
Residents win (new seat)				

=== Walton Central ===
Walton Central
Party	Candidate	Votes	%	±%
The Walton Society	Chris Sadler	1,355	58.6	
The Walton Society	Alan Palmer	1,260	54.5	
The Walton Society	Graham Woolgar	1,150	49.8	
Conservative	Andrew Anderson	748	32.4	
Conservative	Paul Liptrot	714	30.9	
Conservative	Christine Richardson	700	30.3	
Labour	Margaret Hawkes	345	14.9	
Majority				
Turnout		2,321	38.1	
Residents win (new seat)				
Residents win (new seat)				
Residents win (new seat)				

=== Walton North ===
Walton North
Party	Candidate	Votes	%	±%
Conservative	Andrew Kelly	782	45.0	
Conservative	Rachael Lake	731	42.1	
Conservative	Alan Kopitko	670	38.6	
Labour	Richard Leonard	582	33.5	
UKIP	David Ions	468	26.9	
Liberal Democrats	Linda Alanko	406	23.4	
Majority				
Turnout		1,753	29.1	
Conservative win (new seat)				
Conservative win (new seat)				
Conservative win (new seat)				

=== Walton South ===
Walton South
Party	Candidate	Votes	%	±%
Conservative	Christine Elmer	1,408	64.7	
Conservative	Chris Cross	1,325	60.9	
Conservative	Malcolm Howard	1,302	59.8	
Labour	Vera-Anne Anderson	584	26.8	
Liberal Democrats	Alastair Sturgis	522	24.0	
Majority				
Turnout		2,192	32.0	
Conservative win (new seat)				
Conservative win (new seat)				
Conservative win (new seat)				

=== Weybridge Riverside ===
Weybridge Riverside
Party	Candidate	Votes	%	±%
Liberal Democrats	Andrew Davis	893	42.1	
Conservative	Michael Freeman	880	41.5	
Conservative	Andrew Muddyman	784	37.0	
Liberal Democrats	Vicki MacLeod	764	36.0	
Conservative	Barbara Cowin	763	36.0	
Liberal Democrats	Adriana Dredge	616	29.0	
Independent	Craig MacKenzie	468	22.1	
Labour	Stephanie Franklin	238	11.2	
Labour	Warren Weertman	185	8.7	
Labour	Thomas Wicks	164	7.7	
Majority				
Turnout		2,131	36.0	
Liberal Democrats win (new seat)				
Conservative win (new seat)				
Conservative win (new seat)				

=== Weybridge St George's Hill ===
Weybridge St George's Hill
Party	Candidate	Votes	%	±%
Weybridge & St. George's Independents	Peter Harman	1,154	48.3	
Conservative	Ian Donaldson	1,057	44.3	
Conservative	Simon Foale	1,033	43.3	
Weybridge & St. George's Independents	Tom Catton	1,029	43.1	
Weybridge & St. George's Independents	Rani Bhamra	883	37.0	
Conservative	John Rowland	862	36.1	
Labour	Lee Godfrey	176	7.4	
Labour	Angus Rendall	149	6.2	
Majority				
Turnout		2,394	38.4	
Residents win (new seat)				
Conservative win (new seat)				
Conservative win (new seat)				
