= 2015 Rochford District Council election =

English election

- 7 May 2015

13 seats (out of 39) 20 seats needed for a majority
	First party	Second party	Third party
Party	Conservative	UKIP	Rochford Resident
	Fourth party	Fifth party	Sixth party
Party	Liberal Democrats	Green	Labour
- Results of the 2015 Rochford District Council election

The 2015 Rochford District Council election took place on 7 May 2015 to elect members of the Rochford District Council in England. It was held on the same day as other local elections.
