= 2016 Adur District Council election =

British council election

Map of the results of the 2016 Adur District Council election. Conservatives in blue, Labour in red, UKIP in purple and independents in grey.

The 2016 Adur District Council elections took place on 5 May 2016 to elect members of Adur District Council in West Sussex, England. Half of the council was up for election, and the Conservative Party remained in overall control of the council. The Labour Party trebled their number of seats from one to three.

After the election, the composition of the council was:

- Conservative 16 (-4)
- UKIP 8 (+2)
- Labour 3 (+2)
- Shoreham Beach Residents Association 2 (no change)

== Results ==
Adur local election result 2016
Party	Seats	Gains	Losses	Net gain/loss	Seats %	Votes %	Votes	+/−
Conservative	7	0	3	-3	46.7	35.8	5,729	
UKIP	4	0	1	-1	26.7	23.0	3,687	
Labour	3	3	0	3	20.0	24.4	3,912	
Independent	1	0	0	0	6.7	6.5	1,036	
Liberal Democrats	0	0	0	0	0.0	7.2	1,149	
Green	0	0	0	0	0.0	3.1	489	

== Ward results ==
Buckingham
Party	Candidate	Votes	%	±%
Conservative	Kevin Boram	520	52.4%	−8.4%
Labour	Michael Thornton	195	19.7%	+2.1%
UKIP	Darren Compton	133	13.4%	−0.1%
Liberal Democrats	Cyril Cannings	69	7.0%	−1.1%
Green	Leslie Groves Williams	68	6.9%	+6.9%
Majority		325	32.8%	−10.4%
Turnout		992	31.9%	+1.8%
Conservative hold		Swing	5.3% Con to Lab	

Churchill
Party	Candidate	Votes	%	±%
UKIP	Robin Monk	393	33.8%	−2.2%
Conservative	Pat Beresford	362	31.1%	−5.0%
Labour	Daniel Ballance	267	22.9%	+22.9%
Liberal Democrats	Steve Creed	123	10.6%	−17.3%
Majority		31	2.7%	+2.7%
Turnout		1,164	34.2%	+8.3%
UKIP gain from Conservative		Swing	1.4% Con to UKIP	

Cokeham
Party	Candidate	Votes	%	±%
Labour	Barry Mear	376	33.3%	−6.1%
UKIP	Mick Clark	358	31.7%	+12.6%
Conservative	Paul Mansfield	328	29.1%	−6.3%
Liberal Democrats	Raj Dooraree	58	5.1%	−0.8%
Majority		18	1.6%	−2.7%
Turnout		1,128	33.6%	+4.5%
Labour hold		Swing	9.4% Lab to UKIP	

Eastbrook
Party	Candidate	Votes	%	±%
Labour	Les Alden	429	39.6%	+5.8%
Conservative	Dave Donaldson	405	37.4%	0.0%
UKIP	Louise Hearne	189	17.5%	+4.8%
Green	Patrick Ginnelly	49	4.5%	−4.4%
Majority		24	2.2%	+2.2%
Turnout		1,083	32.0%	+3.0%
Labour gain from Conservative		Swing	2.9% Con to Lab	

Hillside
Party	Candidate	Votes	%	±%
Conservative	Angus Dunn	551	51.5%	+0.5%
Labour	Steve Gilbert	253	23.6%	−3.8%
UKIP	Jenny Greig	186	17.4%	+2.1%
Green	Helen Mears	40	3.7%	+3.7%
Liberal Democrats	Keith Humphrey	37	3.5%	−2.7%
Majority		298	27.9%	+4.3%
Turnout		1,070	31.8%	+3.0%
Conservative hold		Swing	2.2% Lab to Con	

Manor
Party	Candidate	Votes	%	±%
Conservative	Carson Albury	461	37.1%	−3.8%
UKIP	Jason Lock	316	25.5%	−8.4%
Labour	John Ballance	198	16.0%	+0.6%
Independent	Keith Dollemore	168	13.5%	N/A
Liberal Democrats	Steve Martin	77	6.2%	−3.5%
Majority		145	11.6%	+4.8%
Turnout		1,241	38.1%	+8.1%
Conservative hold		Swing	2.3% UKIP to Con	

Marine
Party	Candidate	Votes	%	±%
Independent	Joss Loader	868	67.8%	+0.8%
Labour	Adrienne Lowe	191	14.9%	+2.6%
UKIP	Darren Compton	151	11.8%	−2.0%
Liberal Democrats	Tom Hilditch	57	4.4%	−2.6%
Majority		677	52.9%	−0.3%
Turnout		1,281	36.2%	+11.2%
Independent hold		Swing	0.9% Ind to Lab	

Mash Barn
Party	Candidate	Votes	%	±%
UKIP	Liz Haywood	398	41.6%	+17.4%
Conservative	Neil Maguinness	212	22.3%	−12.0%
Labour	Douglas Bradley	184	19.3%	−2.9%
Liberal Democrats	Doris Martin	146	15.4%	−3.9%
Majority		186	19.6%	+19.6%
Turnout		951	28.4%	+4.6%
UKIP hold		Swing	9.9% Con to UKIP	

Peverel
Party	Candidate	Votes	%	±%
Conservative	George Barton	491	45.4%	+2.3%
UKIP	Ray McLeod	322	29.8%	+9.2%
Labour	Alun Jones	194	17.9%	−11.5%
Liberal Democrats	Nilda Dooraree	67	6.2%	−0.7%
Majority		169	15.6%	+1.9%
Turnout		1,081	31.6%	+6.6%
Conservative hold		Swing	3.5% Con to UKIP	

Southlands
Party	Candidate	Votes	%	±%
UKIP	Paul Graysmark	301	30.9%	+15.8%
Conservative	Tony Nicklen	289	29.7%	−8.3%
Labour	Kieran Francis	281	28.9%	−8.2%
Liberal Democrats	Drew Tinsley	95	9.7%	−0.1%
Majority		12	1.2%	+1.2%
Turnout		973	33.5%	+4.6%
UKIP gain from Conservative		Swing	12.1% Con to UKIP	

Southwick Green
Party	Candidate	Votes	%	±%
Conservative	Peter Metcalfe	530	50.0%	−3.1%
Labour	David Bowen	252	23.8%	−0.9%
UKIP	Bill Jarman	142	13.4%	+0.6%
Liberal Democrats	David Edey	67	6.3%	−3.1%
Green	Annie Brown	65	6.1%	+6.1%
Majority		278	26.2%	−2.2%
Turnout		1,061	31.5%	+1.8%
Conservative hold		Swing	1.1% Con to Lab	

St Mary's
Party	Candidate	Votes	%	±%
Labour	Sami Zeglam	401	33.4%	+7.2%
Conservative	Cindy Golds	374	31.1%	−4.5%
UKIP	Sean Ridley	176	14.7%	+3.8%
Green	Paul Hendy	154	12.8%	−9.0%
Liberal Democrats	Nevvy Merrett	89	7.4%	+2.0%
Majority		27	2.2%	+2.2%
Turnout		1,201	32.8%	+5.3%
Labour gain from Conservative		Swing	5.9% Con to Lab	

St Nicolas
Party	Candidate	Votes	%	±%
Conservative	Brian Coomber	590	48.0%	−2.0%
Labour	Irene Reed	292	23.7%	+0.1%
UKIP	Jean Turner	116	9.4%	−3.6%
Green	Louise Miller	113	9.2%	+9.2%
Liberal Democrats	Jan Kimber	108	8.8%	−4.6%
Majority		298	24.2%	−2.2%
Turnout		1,230	39.7%	+13.3%
Conservative hold		Swing	1.1% Con to Lab	

Widewater (2)
Party	Candidate	Votes	%	±%
Conservative	Ann Bridges	616		
UKIP	Clive Burghard	506		
UKIP	Gloria Eveleigh	492		
Conservative	Nicholas Pigott	411		
Labour	Lee Cowen	399		
Labour	Jacqueline Pilkington	366		
Liberal Democrats	Andrew Serhan	156		
Turnout			36.9	+9.3
Conservative hold		Swing		
UKIP gain from Conservative		Swing		
