= Halton Borough Council elections =

Local government elections in Cheshire, England

Halton Borough Council elections are generally held three years out of every four, with a third of the council being elected each time. The fourth year, in which no elections are held, is known as a 'fallow year'. Halton Borough Council is the local authority for the unitary authority of Halton in Cheshire, England. Since the last boundary changes in 2021, 54 councillors have been elected from 18 wards.

== Council elections ==
- 1973 Halton Borough Council election
- 1976 Halton Borough Council election (new ward boundaries)
- 1979 Halton Borough Council election
- 1980 Halton Borough Council election
- 1982 Halton Borough Council election
- 1983 Halton Borough Council election
- 1984 Halton Borough Council election
- 1986 Halton Borough Council election (new ward boundaries)
- 1987 Halton Borough Council election
- 1988 Halton Borough Council election
- 1990 Halton Borough Council election
- 1991 Halton Borough Council election
- 1992 Halton Borough Council election
- 1994 Halton Borough Council election (Borough boundary changes took place but the number of seats remained the same)
- 1995 Halton Borough Council election
- 1996 Halton Borough Council election
- 1997 Halton Borough Council election (new ward boundaries)
- 1999 Halton Borough Council election
- 2000 Halton Borough Council election
- 2001 Halton Borough Council election
- 2002 Halton Borough Council election
- 2004 Halton Borough Council election (new ward boundaries)
- 2006 Halton Borough Council election
- 2007 Halton Borough Council election
- 2008 Halton Borough Council election
- 2010 Halton Borough Council election
- 2011 Halton Borough Council election
- 2012 Halton Borough Council election
- 2014 Halton Borough Council election
- 2015 Halton Borough Council election
- 2016 Halton Borough Council election
- 2018 Halton Borough Council election
- 2019 Halton Borough Council election
- 2021 Halton Borough Council election (new ward boundaries)
- 2022 Halton Borough Council election
- 2023 Halton Borough Council election
- 2024 Halton Borough Council election
- 2026 Halton Borough Council election

== Results maps ==
2004 results map

2006 results map

2007 results map

2008 results map

2010 results map

2011 results map

2012 results map

2014 results map

2015 results map

2016 results map

2018 results map

2019 results map

2021 results map

2022 results map

2023 results map

2024 results map

2026 results map

== By-election results ==
=== 1997-2001 ===
Hough Green By-Election 7 May 1998
Party	Candidate	Votes	%	±%
Labour		741	75.2	+8.5
Liberal Democrats		245	24.8	+7.9
Majority		496	50.4	
Turnout		986		
Labour hold		Swing		

=== 2004-2006 ===
Castlefields By-Election 7 July 2005
Party	Candidate	Votes	%	±%
Labour		355	49.5	+5.7
Liberal Democrats		249	34.7	+19.2
Conservative		98	13.6	+1.0
Independent		15	2.1	−16.3
Majority		106	14.8	
Turnout		717	15.2	
Labour hold		Swing		

=== 2006-2010 ===
Castlefields By-Election 6 July 2006
Party	Candidate	Votes	%	±%
Labour	Harry Howard	359	42.6	−1.2
Liberal Democrats	Peter Blackmore	345	40.9	+25.4
Independent	Jimmy Tang	87	10.3	−8.1
Conservative	Marjorie Bradshaw	52	6.2	−6.4
Majority		14	1.7	
Turnout		843	18.4	
Labour hold		Swing		

=== 2014-2018 ===
Kingsway By-Election 11 December 2014
Party	Candidate	Votes	%	±%
Labour	Andrea Wall	537	73.2	−2.3
UKIP	Brad Bradshaw	164	22.3	−2.2
Conservative	Duncan Harper	22	3.0	+3.0
Liberal Democrats	Paul Meara	11	1.1	+1.1
Majority		373	50.8	
Turnout		734		
Labour hold		Swing		

Halton Castle By-Election 15 February 2018
Party	Candidate	Votes	%	±%
Labour	Christopher Carlin	522	70.3	−5.7
Independent	Darrin Whyte	133	17.9	+9.5
Conservative	Ian Adams	88	11.8	+11.8
Majority		389	52.4	
Turnout		743		
Labour hold		Swing		

=== 2018-2022 ===
Ditton By-Election 11 October 2018
Party	Candidate	Votes	%	±%
Labour	Edward Dourley	644	73.5	+11.6
Conservative	Daniel Clark	135	15.4	+15.4
Liberal Democrats	David Coveney	97	11.1	+11.1
Majority		509	58.1	
Turnout		876		
Labour hold		Swing		

Halton Castle By-Election 25 November 2021
Party	Candidate	Votes	%	±%
Labour	Sharon Thornton	373	60.3	+7.9
Green	Iain Ferguson	117	18.9	+18.9
Independent	Darrin Whyte	69	11.1	−7.2
Conservative	Danny Clarke	45	7.3	−10.6
Liberal Democrats	Anthony Dalton	15	2.4	−8.9
Majority		256	41.4	
Turnout		619		
Labour hold		Swing		

=== 2026-2030 ===
Farnworth By-Election 25 June 2026
Party	Candidate	Votes	%	±%
Labour	Louise Nolan	835	51.0	+14.5
Reform	Christopher Charlton-Kingsley	596	36.4	+0.0
Conservative	Phil Harper	126	7.7	−5.7
Green	Kiel Oldfield	77	4.7	−9.0
Libertarian	Dan Clarke	3	0.2	+0.2
Majority		239	14.6	
Turnout		1,637		
Labour hold		Swing		

Beechwood and Heath By-Election 29 October 2026
Party	Candidate	Votes	%	±%
Reform	Neil Thornton	750	36.5	−3.0
Liberal Democrats	Diane Inch	559	27.2	−17.5
Labour	Owen Ashworth	535	6.5	+6.5
Restore	Ash Corcoran	134	7.7	+7.7
Conservative	Luke Hanson	56	2.7	+2.7
Independent	Dan Clarke	19	0.9	+0.9
Majority		191	9.3	
Turnout		2,053		
Reform gain from Liberal Democrats		Swing		
