= 2024 Halton Borough Council election =

Local election in Halton, England

- 2 May 2024

18 of 54 seats on Halton Borough Council 28 seats needed for a majority
- Turnout: 21%

	First party	Second party	Third party
Leader	Mike Wharton	Margaret Ratcliffe	John Bradshaw
Party	Labour	Liberal Democrats	Conservative
Seats before	49	3	2
Seats won	17	1	0
Seats after	50	3	1
Seat change	▲1	Steady	▼1
Popular vote	13,730	2,104	2,343
Percentage	68.1%	10.4%	11.6%
- Winner of each seat at the 2024 Halton Borough Council election
Leader before election
Mike Wharton
Labour
Leader after election
Mike Wharton
Labour

The 2024 Halton Borough Council election was held on Thursday 2 May 2024, alongside the other local elections in the United Kingdom held on the same day. One-third of the 54 members of Halton Borough Council in Cheshire were elected. Labour retained its majority on the Council.

== Background ==
Halton had been a strong council for the Labour Party since its creation. Labour had held majorities on the council for its entire history as a unitary authority, only falling below 60% of seats in the late-2000s. In the previous election, Labour won 17 seats (up 1) with 64.4% of the vote, the Liberal Democrats won 1 with 9.9%, and the Conservatives lost the seat they were defending with 16.0%.

The 2021 election took place on new boundaries, with all seats being elected. Because of this, the seats which were up for election in 2024 were those held by the candidates who won first place in each ward in the 2021 election. Labour were defending 16 seats, and the Liberal Democrats and Conservatives were defending 1 seat each.

== Previous council composition ==
After 2023 election		Before 2024 election		After 2024 election	
Party	Seats	Party	Seats	Party	Seats
Labour	49	Labour	49	Labour	50
Liberal Democrats	3	Liberal Democrats	3	Liberal Democrats	3
Conservative	2	Conservative	2	Conservative	1

== Results ==
Only one seat changed parties at this election; Labour increased their majority, gaining one seat from the Conservatives, who were left with just one seat on the council.

Halton Borough Council Election Result 2024
Party	This election			Full council			This election		
Party	Seats	Net	Seats %	Other	Total	Total %	Votes	Votes %	+/−
Labour	17	▲1	94.4	33	50	92.6	13,730	68.1	+3.7
Liberal Democrats	1	Steady	5.6	2	3	5.6	2,104	10.4	+0.5
Conservative	0	▼1	0.0	1	1	1.9	2,343	11.6	−4.4
Green	0	Steady	0.0	0	0	0.0	1,350	6.7	−1.5
Independent	0	Steady	0.0	0	0	0.0	333	1.7	+0.7
Liberal	0	Steady	0.0	0	0	0.0	104	0.5	N/A
Reform	0	Steady	0.0	0	0	0.0	193	1.0	+0.5

== Ward Results ==
An asterisk denotes an incumbent councillor.

=== Appleton ===
Appleton
Party	Candidate	Votes	%	±%
Labour	Eddie Jones*	826	87.2	+6.8
Conservative	David Findon	121	12.8	+3.8
Majority				
Turnout		947	20	
Labour hold				

=== Bankfield ===
Bankfield
Party	Candidate	Votes	%	±%
Labour	Tony McDermott*	810	84.6	+2.8
Conservative	Ray Roberts	147	15.4	−2.8
Majority				
Turnout		957	20	
Labour hold		Swing		

=== Beechwood & Heath ===
Beechwood & Heath
Party	Candidate	Votes	%	±%
Liberal Democrats	Margaret Ratcliffe*	806	44.4	−7.1
Labour	Louise Whitley	625	34.5	+2.4
Reform	Rhona Bentley	193	10.6	N/A
Liberal	Danny Clarke	104	5.7	N/A
Green	Sariel Arjona	86	4.7	N/A
Majority				
Turnout		1,814	30	
Liberal Democrats hold		Swing		

=== Birchfield ===
Birchfield
Party	Candidate	Votes	%	±%
Labour	Angela Ball*	878	63.0	+1.5
Conservative	John Powell	367	26.3	+2.2
Liberal Democrats	Andrew Teebay	149	10.7	−3.8
Majority				
Turnout		1,394	23	
Labour hold		Swing		

=== Bridgewater ===
Bridgewater
Party	Candidate	Votes	%	±%
Labour	Stef Nelson*	850	72.9	+3.1
Green	Christopher Sankey	118	10.1	+0.5
Conservative	Susan Forder	104	8.9	−3.6
Liberal Democrats	Jonathan Howard	94	8.1	+0.1
Majority				
Turnout		1,166	20	
Labour hold		Swing		

=== Central & West Bank ===
Central & West Bank
Party	Candidate	Votes	%	±%
Labour	Pamela Wallace*	476	72.9	+13.0
Independent	Callum Hewitt	74	11.3	N/A
Green	Anthony McMullin	73	11.2	−15.1
Conservative	Julie Powell	30	4.6	N/A
Majority				
Turnout		653	14	
Labour hold				

=== Daresbury, Moore & Sandymoor ===
Daresbury, Moore & Sandymoor
Party	Candidate	Votes	%	±%
Labour	Neil Connolly	652	53.3	+11.8
Conservative	Sandra Myndiuk-Davidson	234	19.1	−7.1
Green	Iain Ferguson	219	17.9	−8.9
Liberal Democrats	John Secker	118	9.6	+4.1
Majority				
Turnout		1,223	29	
Labour gain from Conservative		Swing		

=== Ditton, Hale Village & Halebank ===
Ditton, Hale Village & Halebank
Party	Candidate	Votes	%	±%
Labour	Mike Wharton*	799	83.4	+3.7
Conservative	Philip Harper	159	16.6	−3.7
Majority				
Turnout		958	19	
Labour hold		Swing		

=== Farnworth ===
Farnworth
Party	Candidate	Votes	%	±%
Labour	Angela McInerney*	1,046	74.2	+3.8
Conservative	Colleen Harper	363	25.8	−3.8
Majority				
Turnout		1,409	24	
Labour hold		Swing		

=== Grange ===
Grange
Party	Candidate	Votes	%	±%
Labour	Katy McDonough	638	67.8	+0.3
Independent	Daniel Baker	119	12.6	+2.7
Conservative	Thomas Aveyard	97	10.3	−2.3
Liberal Democrats	Suzanne Howard	87	9.2	−0.8
Majority				
Turnout		941	17	
Labour hold				

=== Halton Castle ===
Halton Castle
Party	Candidate	Votes	%	±%
Labour	Sharon Thornton*	623	67.8	+1.2
Independent	Darrin Whyte	140	15.2	+4.6
Green	Vanessa Shaw	89	9.7	−1.4
Conservative	Dylan Eaton	67	7.3	+0.5
Majority				
Turnout		919	19	
Labour hold		Swing		

=== Halton Lea ===
Halton Lea
Party	Candidate	Votes	%	±%
Labour	Kath Loftus*	656	74.9	−1.0
Green	Michael O'Day	86	9.8	+1.5
Conservative	Peter Davidson	84	9.6	−2.0
Liberal Democrats	Joanne Rowe	50	5.7	+1.4
Majority				
Turnout		876	18	
Labour hold		Swing		

=== Halton View ===
Halton View
Party	Candidate	Votes	%	±%
Labour	Rob Polhill*	802	70.7	−1.2
Green	Molly Glover	200	17.6	+3.2
Conservative	James Powell	132	11.6	−2.1
Majority				
Turnout		1,134	21	
Labour hold				

=== Highfield ===
Highfield
Party	Candidate	Votes	%	±%
Labour	Andrea Wall*	1,042	89.4	+12.1
Conservative	David Dorian	124	10.6	−1.3
Majority				
Turnout		1,166	24	
Labour hold		Swing		

=== Hough Green ===
Hough Green
Party	Candidate	Votes	%	±%
Labour	Sandra Baker*	748	74.6	+4.4
Conservative	Elaine Dean	152	15.2	−3.2
Green	Philip Beale	103	10.3	−1.1
Majority				
Turnout		1,003	19	
Labour hold		Swing		

=== Mersey & Weston ===
Mersey & Weston
Party	Candidate	Votes	%	±%
Labour	Victoria Begg*	691	56.4	−3.3
Liberal Democrats	Matthew Morris	415	33.8	+12.9
Green	Deborah Brooks	120	9.8	+1.5
Majority				
Turnout		1,226	21	
Labour hold		Swing		

=== Norton North ===
Norton North
Party	Candidate	Votes	%	±%
Labour	Irene Bramwell*	826	60.2	+5.4
Liberal Democrats	Diane Inch	248	18.1	−0.1
Conservative	Adam Burnett	162	11.8	−1.9
Green	Tracy Miller	135	9.8	−3.5
Majority				
Turnout		1,371	25	
Labour hold		Swing		

=== Norton South & Preston Brook ===
Norton South & Preston Brook
Party	Candidate	Votes	%	±%
Labour	Colin Hughes	742	74.2	+5.1
Liberal Democrats	Miriam Hodge	137	13.7	+7.6
Green	Tom Clare	121	12.1	+4.9
Majority				
Turnout		1,000	21	
Labour hold		Swing		
