= 2004 Halton Borough Council election =

Local election in England

The 2004 Halton Borough Council election took place on 10 June 2004 to elect members of Halton Unitary Council in Cheshire, England. The whole council was up for election with boundary changes since the last election in 2002. The Labour Party stayed in overall control of the council.

== Campaign ==
All 56 seats were being contested after boundary changes had taken place, with 119 candidates competing for election. Labour contested all 56 seats, compared to 32 for the Conservatives, 19 Liberal Democrats, 3 Green Party, 2 British National Party, 1 Legalise Cannabis Alliance and 1 independent. There were also 4 candidates from the new Citizens Party of Halton, with 3 of them being former Labour councillors. The election in Halton, along with the rest of North West England, was held with all postal voting as part of an attempt to increase turnout.

Before the election Labour dominated the council with 47 of the 56 seats. As a result, the Liberal Democrats and Conservatives were aiming just to reduce Labour's majority to provide a better opposition, with the Conservatives standing in every ward.

A major issue in the election was the attempt by the council to secure funding for a second crossing over the River Mersey. The Labour Party defended their record in control of the council, pointing to the regeneration of the town centres of Widnes and Runcorn and improvements in services.

== Results ==
The results saw both the Liberal Democrats and Conservatives make significant gains against Labour, but with Labour keeping a safe majority on the council. The Liberal Democrats made gains in Halton Brook, Norton North and Windmill Hill wards, while the Conservatives picked up seats in Birchfield and Farnworth wards. Windmill Hill required 2 recounts before the Liberal Democrat, Kelly Marlow, was declared the winner by a single vote over the Labour candidate. Labour councillors who failed to be re-elected included the deputy mayor, Dennis Middlemass, who lost in Mersey ward to the Liberal Democrats after 12 years on the council. Overall turnout in the election was 38%, almost double what was seen at the last election in 2002.

Labour's leader of the council, Tony McDermott, blamed national policies and mid term votes against the government for the losses, but was pleased at preserving a good majority which he said demonstrated "a welcome level of support".

Halton local election result 2004
Party	Seats	Gains	Losses	Net gain/loss	Seats %	Votes %	Votes	+/−
Labour	35			-12	62.5	55.3	42,002	-3.8
Liberal Democrats	14			+7	25.0	19.3	14,632	-1.1
Conservative	7			+5	12.5	19.4	14,740	+1.9
Green	0			0	0.0	2.5	1,906	+2.5
Citizens Party of Halton	0			0	0.0	2.0	1,513	+2.0
BNP	0			0	0.0	0.7	529	+0.7
Independent	0			0	0.0	0.6	440	-1.0
Legalise Cannabis	0			0	0.0	0.2	158	+0.2

== Ward results ==
Appleton (3)
Party	Candidate	Votes	%	±%
Labour	Edward Jones	1,101		
Labour	Gerald Philbin	985		
Labour	Francis Nyland	897		
Conservative	John Littler	365		
Conservative	Desmond McDermott	323		
BNP	Andrew Taylor	297		
Legalise Cannabis	Emma O'Neill	158		
Turnout		4,127		

Beechwood (2)
Party	Candidate	Votes	%	±%
Liberal Democrats	Linda Redhead	942		
Liberal Democrats	Ulfar Norddahl	865		
Labour	Martha Lloyd Jones	333		
Labour	Maurice Craig	243		
Conservative	Phillip Speed	194		
Conservative	Patricia Parkinson	182		
Turnout		2,759		

Birchfield (3)
Party	Candidate	Votes	%	±%
Conservative	David Lewis	868		
Conservative	David Findon	851		
Conservative	Geoffrey Swift	751		
Labour	Austin Clarke	612		
Labour	Valerie Hill	569		
Labour	John Fahey	542		
Turnout		4,193		

Broadheath (3)
Party	Candidate	Votes	%	±%
Labour	Anthony McDermott	1,176		
Labour	Robert Gilligan	889		
Labour	Keith Morley	761		
Conservative	Philip Harper	466		
Turnout		3,292		

Castlefields (3)
Party	Candidate	Votes	%	±%
Labour	Patrick Tyrrell	1,045		
Labour	Arthur Cole	833		
Labour	Liam Temple	816		
Independent	Jimmy Tang	440		
Liberal Democrats	Barbara Sly	369		
Conservative	Wendy Perraten	300		
BNP	Anthony Watts	232		
Turnout		4,035		

Daresbury (2)
Party	Candidate	Votes	%	±%
Liberal Democrats	C Inch	545		
Conservative	J Bradshaw	517		
Liberal Democrats	K Newall	506		
Conservative	B Price	467		
Labour	J Johnston	322		
Labour	A Stockton	305		
Turnout		2,662		

Ditton (3)
Party	Candidate	Votes	%	±%
Labour	Marie Wright	1,185		
Labour	Shaun Osborne	1,051		
Labour	Peter Lloyd Jones	884		
Conservative	Colin Rowan	681		
Turnout		3,801		

Farnworth (3)
Party	Candidate	Votes	%	±%
Conservative	Carl Cross	1,049		
Conservative	Ian Whittaker	905		
Conservative	Philip Drakeley	884		
Labour	Andrew MacManus	702		
Labour	Damian Curzon	671		
Labour	Margaret Fahey	630		
Liberal Democrats	Malcolm Hare	602		
Turnout		5,443		

Grange (3)
Party	Candidate	Votes	%	±%
Labour	John Swain	873		
Labour	Stephen Pearsall	822		
Labour	Mark Dennett	796		
Liberal Democrats	James Maguire	622		
Conservative	Mary Taylor	406		
Turnout		3,519		

Hale
Party	Candidate	Votes	%	±%
Labour	Michael Wharton	605	73.7	
Conservative	Suzannah Swift	216	26.3	
Majority		389	47.4	
Turnout		821		

Halton Brook (3)
Party	Candidate	Votes	%	±%
Labour	Stefan Nelson	944		
Labour	John Massey	850		
Liberal Democrats	Kathleen Hodgkinson	690		
Labour	Stanley Hill	650		
Conservative	Roger Tuson	366		
Turnout		3,500		

Halton Lea (3)
Party	Candidate	Votes	%	±%
Labour	David Thompson	800		
Labour	Kathleen Loftus	752		
Labour	Alan Lowe	713		
Citizens Party of Halton	Michael Gelling	368		
Liberal Democrats	Janet Clein	351		
Citizens Party of Halton	Damian Matthews	329		
Conservative	Elizabeth Ford	258		
Turnout		3,571		

Halton View (3)
Party	Candidate	Votes	%	±%
Labour	Robert Polhill	1,149		
Labour	Stanley Parker	961		
Labour	Thomas McInerney	903		
Green	Derek Mellor	566		
Green	Ann Martland	562		
Green	Glenys Taylor	509		
Conservative	Denis Thomas	475		
Turnout		5,125		

Heath (3)
Party	Candidate	Votes	%	±%
Liberal Democrats	Michael Hodgkinson	1,134		
Liberal Democrats	Margaret Ratcliffe	1,124		
Liberal Democrats	Christopher Rowe	1,117		
Conservative	Marjorie Bradshaw	605		
Labour	Joan Lowe	371		
Conservative	Peter Murray	340		
Conservative	Philip Balmer	332		
Labour	Carol Redican	326		
Labour	Karen Linforth	253		
Turnout		5,602		

Hough Green (3)
Party	Candidate	Votes	%	±%
Labour	Paul Nolan	1,069		
Labour	Kevan Wainwright	950		
Labour	Philip Harris	948		
Conservative	Maureen Forsyth	514		
Conservative	Brian Hensley	456		
Turnout		3,937		

Kingsway (3)
Party	Candidate	Votes	%	±%
Labour	Margaret Horabin	996		
Labour	Ann Gerrard	934		
Labour	Francis Fraser	861		
Conservative	Frank Lloyd	470		
Conservative	Terence McDermott	429		
Turnout		3,690		

Mersey (3)
Party	Candidate	Votes	%	±%
Liberal Democrats	Sue Blackmore	950		
Liberal Democrats	Ernest Ratcliffe	847		
Liberal Democrats	Trevor Higginson	814		
Labour	Reginald Eastup	604		
Labour	Glyn Redican	581		
Labour	Dennis Middlemas	526		
Conservative	Colin Keam	309		
Turnout		4,631		

Norton North (3)
Party	Candidate	Votes	%	±%
Liberal Democrats	Timothy Sly	989		
Liberal Democrats	Diane Inch	980		
Liberal Democrats	Gary Fowler	928		
Labour	Ellen Cargill	759		
Labour	Mary Massey	685		
Labour	John Stockton	646		
Green	Michael Davies	269		
Conservative	David Wright	263		
Turnout		5,519		

Norton South (3)
Party	Candidate	Votes	%	±%
Labour	Ronald Hignett	873		
Labour	David Cargill	856		
Labour	Irene Ashley	810		
Citizens Party of Halton	Ian Evans	411		
Citizens Party of Halton	Joseph Glover	405		
Conservative	William Dowdle	229		
Turnout		3,584		

Riverside (2)
Party	Candidate	Votes	%	±%
Labour	David Leadbetter	705		
Labour	Edwin Gleave	623		
Conservative	Margaret Hill	211		
Turnout		1,539		

Windmill Hill
Party	Candidate	Votes	%	±%
Liberal Democrats	Kelly Marlow	257	45.0	
Labour	Peter Harding	256	44.8	
Conservative	Sylvia Dowdle	58	10.2	
Majority		1	0.2	
Turnout		571		
