= 2019 Halton Borough Council election =

2019 UK local government election

← 2018	2 May 2019	2021 →

18 seats to Halton Borough Council 29 seats needed for a majority

	First party	Second party	Third party
Party	Labour	Liberal Democrats	Conservative
Last election	18 seats, 66.7%	1 seat, 7.8%	1 seat, 15.1%
Seats before	52	2	2
Seats won	17	1	1
Seats after	51	3	2
Seat change	▼1	▲1	Steady
Popular vote	13,137	2,776	3,648
Percentage	60.5%	12.8%	16.8%
- Results of the 2019 Halton Borough Council election
Leader of the Council before election
Rob Polhill
Labour
Leader of the Council after election
Rob Polhill
Labour

The 2019 Halton Borough Council election took place on 2 May 2019 to elect members of the Halton Borough Council in England. It was held on the same day as other local elections.

== Results summary ==
2019 Halton Borough Council election
Party	This election			Full council			This election		
Party	Seats	Net	Seats %	Other	Total	Total %	Votes	Votes %	+/−
Labour	17	▼1	89.5	34	51	91.1	13,137	60.5	
Liberal Democrats	1	▲1	5.3	2	3	5.3	2,776	12.8	
Conservative	1	Steady	5.3	1	2	3.6	3,648	16.8	
UKIP	0	Steady	0.0	0	0	0.0	1,046	4.8	
Green	0	Steady	0.0	0	0	0.0	523	2.4	
Independent	0	Steady	0.0	0	0	0.0	321	1.5	

== Ward results ==
=== Appleton ===
Appleton
Party	Candidate	Votes	%	±%
Labour	Ged Philbin	856	83.2	
Conservative	Duncan Harper	173	16.8	
Majority				
Turnout				
Labour hold		Swing		

=== Beechwood ===
Beechwood
Party	Candidate	Votes	%	±%
Labour	Chris Loftus	412	39.0	
Liberal Democrats	Linda Redhead	361	34.2	
UKIP	Rhona Bentley	176	16.7	
Conservative	Peter Davidson	107	10.1	
Majority				
Turnout				
Labour hold		Swing		

=== Birchfield ===
Birchfield
Party	Candidate	Votes	%	±%
Labour	Sandra Baker	644	57.0	
Conservative	John Powell	258	22.9	
Liberal Democrats	Romana Coveney	227	20.1	
Majority				
Turnout				
Labour hold		Swing		

=== Broadheath ===
Broadheath
Party	Candidate	Votes	%	±%
Labour	Robert Gilligan	821	83.8	
Conservative	Joshua Hodnett	159	16.2	
Majority				
Turnout				
Labour hold		Swing		

=== Daresbury ===
Daresbury
Party	Candidate	Votes	%	±%
Conservative	John Bradshaw	543	40.8	
Labour	Colin Hughes	374	28.1	
Green	Andrew Dyer	307	23.0	
Liberal Democrats	Miriam Hodge	108	8.1	
Majority				
Turnout				
Conservative hold		Swing		

=== Ditton ===
Ditton
Party	Candidate	Votes	%	±%
Labour	Edward Dourley	850	69.6	
Conservative	Granville Spencer	193	15.8	
Liberal Democrats	David Coveney	179	14.6	
Majority				
Turnout				
Labour hold		Swing		

=== Farnworth ===
Farnworth
Party	Candidate	Votes	%	±%
Labour	Angela McInerney	981	56.1	
Conservative	Colleen Harper	459	26.3	
UKIP	Andrea Baines	308	17.6	
Majority				
Turnout				
Labour hold		Swing		

=== Grange ===
Grange
Party	Candidate	Votes	%	±%
Labour	Joan Lowe	574	58.2	
UKIP	Lee Urquhart	189	19.1	
Liberal Democrats	Joanne Rowe	142	14.4	
Conservative	Philip Drakeley	82	8.3	
Majority				
Turnout				
Labour hold		Swing		

=== Halton Brook ===
Halton Brook
Party	Candidate	Votes	%	±%
Labour	Carol Plumpton-Walsh	711	64.5	
Socialist Alternative	Stephen Armstrong	247	22.4	
Conservative	David Dorian	144	13.1	
Majority				
Turnout				
Labour hold		Swing		

=== Halton Castle ===
Halton Castle
Party	Candidate	Votes	%	±%
Labour	Chris Carlin	712	62.1	
Independent	Darrin Whyte	321	28.0	
Conservative	Julie Powell	113	9.9	
Majority				
Turnout				
Labour hold		Swing		

=== Halton Lea ===
Halton Lea
Party	Candidate	Votes	%	±%
Labour	Kath Loftus	884	83.0	
Conservative	Sandra Davidson	181	17.0	
Majority				
Turnout				
Labour hold		Swing		

=== Halton View ===
Halton View
Party	Candidate	Votes	%	±%
Labour	Louise Whitley	881	78.2	
Conservative	Tania Clarke	246	21.8	
Majority				
Turnout				
Labour hold		Swing		

=== Heath ===
Heath
Party	Candidate	Votes	%	±%
Liberal Democrats	Margaret Ratcliffe	854	54.5	
Labour	Victoria Begg	369	23.5	
UKIP	Dave Myers	199	12.7	
Conservative	Ian Adams	146	9.3	
Majority				
Turnout				
Liberal Democrats gain from Labour		Swing		

=== Hough Green ===
Hough Green
Party	Candidate	Votes	%	±%
Labour	Kevan Wainwright	759	66.1	
Green	Millie Allen	216	18.8	
Conservative	Joanne McLean	173	15.1	
Majority				
Turnout				
Labour hold		Swing		

=== Kingsway ===
Kingsway
Party	Candidate	Votes	%	±%
Labour	Andrea Wall	843	77.8	
UKIP	Brad Bradshaw	174	16.1	
Conservative	Paul Griffiths	66	6.1	
Majority				
Turnout				
Labour hold		Swing		

=== Mersey ===
Mersey
Party	Candidate	Votes	%	±%
Labour	Norman Plumpton-Walsh	649	55.2	
Liberal Democrats	Jamie Lunt	348	29.6	
Conservative	Daniel Clarke	179	15.2	
Majority				
Turnout				
Labour hold		Swing		

=== Norton North ===
Norton North
Party	Candidate	Votes	%	±%
Labour	Geoff Zygadllo	630	48.8	
Liberal Democrats	Diane Inch	450	34.9	
Conservative	Sian Davidson	211	16.3	
Majority				
Turnout				
Labour hold		Swing		

=== Norton South ===
Norton South
Party	Candidate	Votes	%	±%
Labour	Dave Cargill	694	75.9	
Conservative	Adam Burnett	113	12.4	
Liberal Democrats	Christopher Inch	107	11.7	
Majority				
Turnout				
Labour hold		Swing		

=== Riverside ===
Riverside
Party	Candidate	Votes	%	±%
Labour	Pamela Wallace	493	82.9	
Conservative	Philip Harper	102	17.1	
Majority				
Turnout				
Labour hold		Swing		
