= 2008 Halton Borough Council election =

2008 UK local government election

The 2008 Halton Borough Council election took place on 1 May 2008 to elect members of Halton Unitary Council in Cheshire, England. One third of the council was up for election and the Labour Party stayed in overall control of the council.

After the election, the composition of the council was:

- Labour 33
- Liberal Democrat 14
- Conservative 9

== Campaign ==
20 seats were contested in the election with Labour defending 12, the Liberal Democrats 6 and the Conservatives 2. Among these seats were those of the Labour leader of the council, Tony McDermott, and the Liberal Democrat group leader, Linda Redhead. There were 63 candidates including 20 from Labour, 19 each from the Conservatives and Liberal Democrats, 4 from the Green Party and 1 Citizens Party of Halton candidate. Labour were expected to remain in control of the council, but both Liberal Democrats and Conservatives were hoping to make gains, with the Liberal Democrats targeting Runcorn and the wards of Castlefields and Halton Brook.

A big issue in the election was a plan for an Ineos Chlor heat and power plant in the area with both the Liberal Democrats and Conservatives raising concerns from residents. Other issues included the Mersey Gateway project and the government Building Schools for the Future programme for building new schools. Labour were happy to defend their record in control of the council, but the Conservatives attacked Council Tax rises over the previous decade and the Liberal Democrats said that Runcorn had been neglected in favour of Widnes.

== Results ==
The results saw Labour remain in control of the council as they had been since it became a unitary authority in 1998. Labour held all 12 seats they had been defending, including the leader of the council, Tony McDermott, who was comfortably re-elected in Broadheath ward. He described the results as being a "real vote of confidence in the party".

However, in Halton Brook ward the Labour councillor Stef Nelson only held his seat after a tie which required the drawing of lots. Both Nelson and the Liberal Democrat candidate, Louise Whitley, won 551 votes after 7 recounts, requiring the Returning Officer to draw a lot to decide the result, with Nelson successful and thus being declared to have won the election by 1 vote.

The only seat to change hands was Daresbury, where the Conservative Marjorie Bradshaw gained from the Liberal Democrats, in a ward which her husband had won in the 2007 election. Elsewhere the Green Party significantly reduced the Labour majority in Halton View ward. Overall turnout in the election was slightly down at 26.84%.

Halton local election result 2008
Party	Seats	Gains	Losses	Net gain/loss	Seats %	Votes %	Votes	+/−
Labour	12	0	0	0	60.0	38.1	9,108	-3.1
Liberal Democrats	5	0	1	-1	25.0	30.6	7,327	-0.2
Conservative	3	1	0	+1	15.0	27.4	6,557	+4.8
Green	0	0	0	0	0.0	3.5	847	+0.2
Citizens Party of Halton	0	0	0	0	0.0	0.4	97	0.0

== Ward results ==
Appleton
Party	Candidate	Votes	%	±%
Labour	Eddie Jones	733	70.3	+9.0
Conservative	Thomas Campbell	310	29.7	+10.8
Majority		423	40.6	−1.8
Turnout		1,043	22.2	−1.5
Labour hold		Swing		

Beechwood
Party	Candidate	Votes	%	±%
Liberal Democrats	Linda Redhead	633	55.9	−15.0
Conservative	David Walker	361	31.9	+19.7
Labour	Peter Harding	139	12.3	−4.6
Majority		272	24.0	−30.0
Turnout		1,133	36.2	+2.3
Liberal Democrats hold		Swing		

Birchfield
Party	Candidate	Votes	%	±%
Conservative	Peter Browne	812	57.9	−3.9
Labour	Jo Gleave	398	28.4	−9.8
Liberal Democrats	Jayne Worrall	193	13.8	+13.8
Majority		414	29.5	+5.9
Turnout		1,403	29.2	−0.6
Conservative hold		Swing		

Broadheath
Party	Candidate	Votes	%	±%
Labour	Tony McDermott	557	58.8	−5.8
Conservative	Phillip Harper	229	24.2	+5.1
Liberal Democrats	Geoff Brown	161	17.0	+0.6
Majority		328	34.6	−10.9
Turnout		947	19.7	−5.0
Labour hold		Swing		

Castlefields
Party	Candidate	Votes	%	±%
Labour	Harry Howard	555	48.8	+3.0
Liberal Democrats	Simon Charlesworth	461	40.5	−5.6
Conservative	Terence McDermott	122	10.7	+2.6
Majority		94	8.3	
Turnout		1,138	25.3	−1.1
Labour hold		Swing		

Daresbury
Party	Candidate	Votes	%	±%
Conservative	Marjorie Bradshaw	624	48.4	+0.1
Liberal Democrats	Chris Inch	528	40.9	+5.6
Labour	Amanda Stockton	138	10.7	−5.7
Majority		96	7.4	−5.6
Turnout		1,290	40.5	+3.0
Conservative gain from Liberal Democrats		Swing		

Ditton
Party	Candidate	Votes	%	±%
Labour	Marie Wright	650	43.6	−5.8
Conservative	Stephan Pfaffenzeller	495	33.2	+2.6
Liberal Democrats	Ann Curzon	346	23.2	+3.2
Majority		155	10.4	−8.4
Turnout		1,491	28.4	−1.3
Labour hold		Swing		

Farnworth
Party	Candidate	Votes	%	±%
Conservative	Phillip Balmer	992	58.8	+5.7
Labour	Robert Beck	391	23.2	−3.1
Liberal Democrats	Ian Hare	185	11.0	−3.1
Green	Maureen Miller	120	7.1	+0.6
Majority		601	35.6	+8.8
Turnout		1,688	31.4	−0.8
Conservative hold		Swing		

Grange
Party	Candidate	Votes	%	±%
Labour	John Swain	528	47.7	+3.2
Conservative	William Dowdle	319	28.8	+11.1
Liberal Democrats	Sharam Mesdaghi	259	23.4	−14.5
Majority		209	18.9	+12.3
Turnout		1,106	22.3	−1.3
Labour hold		Swing		

Halton Brook
Party	Candidate	Votes	%	±%
Labour	Stefan Nelson	552	43.9	+5.1
Liberal Democrats	Louise Whitley	551	43.9	−11.1
Conservative	Patricia Parkinson	153	12.2	+6.0
Majority		1	0.1	
Turnout		1,256	26.3	−0.5
Labour hold		Swing		

Halton Lea
Party	Candidate	Votes	%	±%
Labour	David Thompson	543	50.1	−2.6
Conservative	Ian Adams	250	23.1	+6.9
Liberal Democrats	Janet Clein	194	17.9	−4.1
Citizens Party of Halton	Michael Gelling	97	8.9	−0.2
Majority		293	27.0	−3.7
Turnout		1,084	23.6	+1.4
Labour hold		Swing		

Halton View
Party	Candidate	Votes	%	±%
Labour	Robert Polhill	658	37.9	−4.4
Green	Derek Mellor	528	30.4	+6.8
Liberal Democrats	Anna Curzon	336	19.4	−2.5
Conservative	Denis Thomas	213	12.3	+0.1
Majority		130	7.5	−11.2
Turnout		1,735	33.7	+1.7
Labour hold		Swing		

Heath
Party	Candidate	Votes	%	±%
Liberal Democrats	Michael Hodgkinson	1,194	70.3	+15.5
Conservative	Barbara Price	323	19.0	+2.5
Labour	Tedie Cole	181	10.7	−2.0
Majority		871	51.3	+13.0
Turnout		1,698	37.1	−1.1
Liberal Democrats hold		Swing		

Hough Green
Party	Candidate	Votes	%	±%
Labour	Paul Nolan	630	48.9	−4.5
Conservative	Ruth Rowan	403	31.3	+6.7
Liberal Democrats	Stephen Hare	148	11.5	−0.5
Green	Miriam Hodgson	107	8.3	−1.7
Majority		227	17.6	−11.2
Turnout		1,288	24.1	+0.7
Labour hold		Swing		

Kingsway
Party	Candidate	Votes	%	±%
Labour	Margaret Horabin	570	59.0	−5.1
Conservative	Frank Lloyd	217	22.5	+3.1
Green	Linda Mellor	92	9.5	−7.0
Liberal Democrats	Damian Curzon	87	9.0	+9.0
Majority		353	36.5	−8.2
Turnout		966	20.2	−1.1
Labour hold		Swing		

Mersey
Party	Candidate	Votes	%	±%
Liberal Democrats	Sue Blackmore	634	51.8	−2.3
Labour	Norman Plumpton	382	31.2	−2.3
Conservative	Duncan Harper	207	16.9	+4.5
Majority		252	20.6	+0.0
Turnout		1,223	25.9	−0.1
Liberal Democrats hold		Swing		

Norton North
Party	Candidate	Votes	%	±%
Liberal Democrats	Dave Austin	863	60.0	+2.0
Labour	Peter Lloyd Jones	327	22.7	−7.3
Conservative	Mark Walsh	249	17.3	+5.2
Majority		536	37.2	+9.2
Turnout		1,439	29.3	+0.1
Liberal Democrats hold		Swing		

Norton South
Party	Candidate	Votes	%	±%
Labour	Ronald Hignett	587	61.5	−1.8
Liberal Democrats	Andrew Whitley	215	22.5	−4.3
Conservative	David Masheder	152	15.9	+6.0
Majority		372	39.0	+2.5
Turnout		954	20.1	−0.3
Labour hold		Swing		

Riverside
Party	Candidate	Votes	%	±%
Labour	David Leadbetter	441	64.6	+0.4
Conservative	Margaret Hill	126	18.4	+7.3
Liberal Democrats	Paul Meara	116	17.0	−7.7
Majority		315	46.1	+6.6
Turnout		683	19.3	−1.5
Labour hold		Swing		

Windmill Hill
Party	Candidate	Votes	%	±%
Liberal Democrats	Mike Shepperd	223	60.1	+15.1
Labour	Arthur Cole	148	39.9	−4.9
Majority		75	20.2	+20.0
Turnout		371	22.5	
Liberal Democrats hold		Swing		
