= 2000 Halton Borough Council election =

Local election in Cheshire, England

The 2000 Halton Borough Council election took place on 4 May 2000 to elect members of Halton Unitary Council in Cheshire, England. One third of the council was up for election and the Labour Party stayed in overall control of the council.

After the election, the composition of the council was:

- Labour 43
- Liberal Democrat 7
- Independent 4
- Conservative 2

== Campaign ==
Elections were held in all of the wards apart from in Hale ward. In addition to candidates from Labour, Conservatives and Liberal Democrats, there were also several candidates from the newly formed Runcorn Labour Councillors Group (RLCG). This had been formed from 6 Labour councillors who were unhappy with the local party and what they saw as a bias against Runcorn in favour of Widnes.

== Results ==
The results saw Labour maintain a large majority on the council, while the RCLG failed to get any candidates elected. The RCLG had come closest in Palacefields ward where the Labour candidate, Alan Lowe, was the winner by 21 votes.

Halton local election result 2000
Party	Seats	Gains	Losses	Net gain/loss	Seats %	Votes %	Votes	+/−
Labour	16			0	80.0			
Liberal Democrats	2			-1	10.0			
Conservative	2			+1	10.0			
