= 1999 Halton Borough Council election =

1999 UK local government election

The 1999 Halton Borough Council election took place on 6 May 1999 to elect members of Halton Unitary Council in Cheshire, England. One third of the council was up for election and the Labour Party stayed in overall control of the council. Overall turnout in the election was 22.2%.

After the election, the composition of the council was:

- Labour 46
- Liberal Democrat 8
- Conservative 1
- Vacant 1

== Results ==
Halton local election result 1999
Party	Seats	Gains	Losses	Net gain/loss	Seats %	Votes %	Votes	+/−
Labour	15			0	88.2	68.2		
Liberal Democrats	2			0	11.8	19.8		
Conservative	0			0	0.0	11.0		
Others	0			0	0.0	1.0		
