= 2007 Halton Borough Council election =

2007 UK local government election

The 2007 Halton Borough Council election took place on 3 May 2007 to elect members of Halton Unitary Council in Cheshire, England. One third of the council was up for election and the Labour Party stayed in overall control of the council.

After the election, the composition of the council was:

- Labour 33
- Liberal Democrat 15
- Conservative 8

== Campaign ==
Nineteen of the 56 seats on the council were contested in the election including the seat of the Conservative group leader on the council, David Findon. Other candidates included the former Labour mayor, Peter Lloyd-Jones, standing in Norton North after losing his seat in the 2006 election and one British National Party candidate, Andrew Taylor, in Appleton ward.

The campaign saw controversy over the possibility of transferring hospital services from Halton to Warrington, with a campaigner against the move standing for the Liberal Democrats in Halton Brook against the Labour chairman of the North Cheshire Hospitals Trust.

== Results ==
The results saw Labour hold their majority on the council with 33 seats despite losing two in the election. The Labour losses were Allan Massey in Halton Brook ward and the longest serving councillor Arthur Cole in Castlefield, who lost by only 3 votes. Both seats were gained by Liberal Democrats who ended the election with 15 councillors, while the Conservatives still had 8. Overall turnout in the election was 27.33%.

Halton local election result 2007
Party	Seats	Gains	Losses	Net gain/loss	Seats %	Votes %	Votes	+/−
Labour	10	0	2	-2	52.6	41.2	10,025	-4.9
Liberal Democrats	6	2	0	+2	31.6	30.8	7,506	+10.1
Conservative	3	0	0	0	15.8	22.6	5,509	-4.2
Green	0	0	0	0	0.0	3.3	808	-0.3
Independent	0	0	0	0	0.0	1.2	287	-0.1
BNP	0	0	0	0	0.0	0.5	111	-0.2
Citizens Party of Halton	0	0	0	0	0.0	0.4	96	-0.4

== Ward results ==
Appleton
Party	Candidate	Votes	%	±%
Labour	Ged Philbin	695	61.3	−6.2
Conservative	Duncan Harper	214	18.9	−13.6
Liberal Democrats	Jimmy Tang	114	10.1	+10.1
BNP	Andrew Taylor	111	9.8	+9.8
Majority		481	42.4	+7.4
Turnout		1,134	23.7	+1.9
Labour hold		Swing		

Beechwood
Party	Candidate	Votes	%	±%
Liberal Democrats	Ulfar Norddahl	766	70.9	
Labour	Darran Lea	183	16.9	
Conservative	Barbara Price	132	12.2	
Majority		583	54.0	
Turnout		1,081	33.9	
Liberal Democrats hold		Swing		

Birchfield
Party	Candidate	Votes	%	±%
Conservative	David Findon	869	61.8	+6.5
Labour	Jo Gleave	537	38.2	+5.8
Majority		332	23.6	+0.7
Turnout		1,406	29.8	+0.5
Conservative hold		Swing		

Broadheath
Party	Candidate	Votes	%	±%
Labour	Robert Gilligan	776	64.6	−0.3
Conservative	Philip Harper	229	19.1	−16.0
Liberal Democrats	Geoff Brown	197	16.4	+16.4
Majority		547	45.5	+15.7
Turnout		1,202	24.7	+0.4
Labour hold		Swing		

Castlefields
Party	Candidate	Votes	%	±%
Liberal Democrats	Peter Blackmore	565	46.1	+17.6
Labour	Arthur Cole	562	45.8	+7.3
Conservative	Philip Balmer	99	8.1	−0.9
Majority		3	0.3	
Turnout		1,226	26.4	+1.1
Liberal Democrats gain from Labour		Swing		

Daresbury
Party	Candidate	Votes	%	±%
Conservative	John Bradshaw	580	48.3	
Liberal Democrats	Jayne Worrall	424	35.3	
Labour	Amanda Stockton	197	16.4	
Majority		156	13.0	
Turnout		1,201	37.5	
Conservative hold		Swing		

Ditton
Party	Candidate	Votes	%	±%
Labour	Shaun Osborne	784	49.4	+0.4
Conservative	Peter Browne	485	30.6	−20.4
Liberal Democrats	Damian Curzon	318	20.0	+20.0
Majority		299	18.8	
Turnout		1,587	29.7	+2.7
Labour hold		Swing		

Farnworth
Party	Candidate	Votes	%	±%
Conservative	Richard Murray	909	53.1	−1.6
Labour	Robert Beck	450	26.3	−1.0
Liberal Democrats	Ian Hare	242	14.1	+3.0
Green	Maureen Miller	111	6.5	−0.4
Majority		459	26.8	−0.6
Turnout		1,712	32.2	−0.5
Conservative hold		Swing		

Grange
Party	Candidate	Votes	%	±%
Labour	Joan Lowe	538	44.5	−4.4
Liberal Democrats	Philip Pickering	458	37.9	+8.8
Conservative	William Dowdle	214	17.7	−4.3
Majority		80	6.6	−13.2
Turnout		1,210	23.6	+0.3
Labour hold		Swing		

Halton Brook
Party	Candidate	Votes	%	±%
Liberal Democrats	Bob Bryant	714	55.0	+17.7
Labour	John Massey	503	38.8	−11.3
Conservative	Patricia Parkinson	81	6.2	−6.4
Majority		211	16.2	
Turnout		1,298	26.8	+4.2
Liberal Democrats gain from Labour		Swing		

Halton Lea
Party	Candidate	Votes	%	±%
Labour	Kathleen Loftus	554	52.7	−0.5
Liberal Democrats	Janet Clein	231	22.0	−7.7
Conservative	Ian Adams	170	16.2	+6.4
Citizens Party of Halton	Michael Gelling	96	9.1	+1.9
Majority		323	30.7	+7.2
Turnout		1,051	22.2	+1.1
Labour hold		Swing		

Halton View
Party	Candidate	Votes	%	±%
Labour	Stan Parker	719	42.3	+0.2
Green	Derek Mellor	400	23.6	−1.7
Liberal Democrats	Anna Curzon	372	21.9	+4.4
Conservative	Denis Thomas	207	12.2	−2.9
Majority		319	18.7	+1.9
Turnout		1,698	32.0	−0.1
Labour hold		Swing		

Heath
Party	Candidate	Votes	%	±%
Liberal Democrats	Margaret Ratcliffe	982	54.8	−0.2
Conservative	Marjorie Bradshaw	295	16.5	−13.0
Independent	Gareth Stockton	287	16.0	+16.0
Labour	Christopher Loftus	228	12.7	−2.9
Majority		687	38.3	+12.8
Turnout		1,792	38.2	+2.9
Liberal Democrats hold		Swing		

Hough Green
Party	Candidate	Votes	%	±%
Labour	Kevan Wainwright	675	53.4	−10.9
Conservative	Ruth Rowan	311	24.6	−11.1
Liberal Democrats	David Austin	151	12.0	+12.0
Green	Miriam Hodgson	126	10.0	+10.0
Majority		364	28.8	+6.4
Turnout		1,263	23.4	+1.0
Labour hold		Swing		

Kingsway
Party	Candidate	Votes	%	±%
Labour	Ann Gerrard	663	64.1	−1.6
Conservative	Frank Lloyd	201	19.4	−2.1
Green	Linda Mellor	171	16.5	+3.7
Majority		462	44.7	+0.5
Turnout		1,035	21.3	+1.3
Labour hold		Swing		

Mersey
Party	Candidate	Votes	%	±%
Liberal Democrats	Ernest Ratcliffe	693	54.1	+7.5
Labour	Nortman Plumpton	429	33.5	−4.9
Conservative	Maureen Forsyth	159	12.4	−2.6
Majority		264	20.6	+12.4
Turnout		1,281	26.0	−0.9
Liberal Democrats hold		Swing		

Norton North
Party	Candidate	Votes	%	±%
Liberal Democrats	Diane Inch	830	58.0	+6.4
Labour	Peter Lloyd Jones	429	30.0	+1.5
Conservative	Mark Walsh	173	12.1	+0.2
Majority		401	28.0	+4.9
Turnout		1,432	29.2	+1.1
Liberal Democrats hold		Swing		

Norton South
Party	Candidate	Votes	%	±%
Labour	David Cargill	625	63.3	+6.3
Liberal Democrats	Rick Rothwell	265	26.8	+4.6
Conservative	Terence McDermott	98	9.9	−0.1
Majority		360	36.5	+1.7
Turnout		988	20.4	+0.9
Labour hold		Swing		

Riverside
Party	Candidate	Votes	%	±%
Labour	Pamela Wallace	478	64.2	+1.8
Liberal Democrats	Paul Meara	184	24.7	−2.2
Conservative	Margaret Hill	83	11.1	+0.4
Majority		294	39.5	+4.0
Turnout		745	20.8	−0.4
Labour hold		Swing		
