= 2021 Halton Borough Council election =

2021 UK local government election

Results of the 2021 Halton Borough Council election

An election took place on 6 May 2021 to elect all 54 members (reduced from 56 at the last elections) of Halton Borough Council due to a redrawing of boundaries. It was held on the same day as other local elections. Turnout was 25%.

== Results ==
Halton Borough Council Election Result 2021
Party	Seats	Gains	Losses	Net gain/loss	Seats %	Votes %	Votes	+/−
Labour	48			-3	88.89	64.30	34,758	+3.80
Liberal Democrats	3			N/C	5.56	11.72	6,333	-1.08
Conservative	2			N/C	3.70	18.82	10,175	+2.02
Green	1			+1	1.85	3.13	1,693	+0.73
Independent	0			0	0.00	0.97	525	-0.53
Reform	0			0	0.00	0.89	482	+0.89
For Britain	0			0	0.00	0.17	92	+0.17

== Council composition ==
Following the last election in 2019, the composition of the council was:

↓
51	3	2
Labour	LD	C

After the election, the composition of the council was:

↓
48	3	2	1
Labour	LD	C	G

LD - Liberal Democrats
C - Conservative
G - Green Party

== Ward results ==
=== Appleton ===
Appleton (3 seats)
Party	Candidate	Votes	%	±%
Labour	Eddie Jones	760	71.9	
Labour	Ged Philbin	630	59.6	
Labour	Angela Teeling	593	56.1	
Conservative	Cameron Logan James Molyneux	212	20.1	
Turnout		1,068	21	
Labour win (new seat)				
Labour win (new seat)				
Labour win (new seat)				

=== Bankfield ===
Bankfield (3 seats)
Party	Candidate	Votes	%	±%
Labour	Tony McDermott	722	64.8	
Labour	Louise Margaret Goodall	662	59.4	
Labour	Laura Jane Bevan	653	58.6	
Conservative	Joshua Nathan Hodnett	298	26.8	
Turnout		1,130	22	
Labour win (new seat)				
Labour win (new seat)				
Labour win (new seat)				

=== Beechwood & Heath ===
Beechwood & Heath (3 seats)
Party	Candidate	Votes	%	±%
Liberal Democrats	Margaret Anna Ratcliffe	925	42.5	
Liberal Democrats	Chris Rowe	825	37.9	
Liberal Democrats	Gareth Charles Stockton	739	34.0	
Labour	Andrea Dennett	640	29.4	
Labour	Chris Loftus	594	27.3	
Conservative	Daniel David Clarke	532	24.5	
Labour	Susan Angela Lea-Wood	499	22.9	
Conservative	Thomas Peter Moss	446	20.5	
Green	David Heath	285	13.1	
Independent	Rhona Margaret Bentley	108	5.0	
Turnout		2,186	36	
Liberal Democrats win (new seat)				
Liberal Democrats win (new seat)				
Liberal Democrats win (new seat)				

=== Birchfield ===
Birchfield (3 seats)
Party	Candidate	Votes	%	±%
Labour	Angela Heather Ball	937	52.8	
Labour	Bill Woodfall	826	46.6	
Labour	Mike Fry	815	45.9	
Conservative	John Robert Powell	775	43.7	
Conservative	Colleen Mary Harper	658	37.1	
Conservative	Darren Stephen James Soley	591	33.3	
Liberal Democrats	Andrew Peter Teebay	228	12.9	
Turnout		1,789	29	
Labour win (new seat)				
Labour win (new seat)				
Labour win (new seat)				

=== Bridgewater ===
Bridgewater (3 seats)
Party	Candidate	Votes	%	±%
Labour	Stefan Michael John Nelson	745	58.3	
Labour	Carol Patricia Plumpton Walsh	648	50.7	
Labour	John Robert Stockton	648	50.7	
Conservative	David James Dorian	317	24.8	
Liberal Democrats	Suzanne Nicola Howard	249	19.5	
Turnout		1,300	22	
Labour win (new seat)				
Labour win (new seat)				
Labour win (new seat)				

=== Central & West Bank ===
Central & West Bank (3 seats)
Party	Candidate	Votes	%	±%
Labour	Pamela Wallace	535	69.6	
Labour	Stan Hill	478	62.2	
Labour	Noel Hutchinson	429	55.8	
Conservative	Joanne Lesley McLean	140	18.2	
Liberal Democrats	Romana Aleksandra Coveney	113	14.7	
Conservative	John Grant Fifield	111	14.4	
Turnout		773	16	
Labour win (new seat)				
Labour win (new seat)				
Labour win (new seat)				

=== Daresbury, Moore & Sandymoor ===
Daresbury, Moore & Sandymoor (3 seats)
Party	Candidate	Votes	%	±%
Conservative	John Christopher Bradshaw	553	44.7	
Conservative	Marjorie Bradshaw	496	40.1	
Green	Andrew Dyer	485	39.2	
Conservative	Sian Fiona Alexandra Davidson	465	37.6	
Labour	Pj Horton	322	26.0	
Labour	Colin William Hughes	319	25.8	
Liberal Democrats	John Segrue Secker	304	24.6	
Liberal Democrats	Loulie Secker	275	22.2	
Turnout		1,243	33	
Conservative win (new seat)				
Conservative win (new seat)				
Green win (new seat)				

=== Ditton, Hale Village & Halebank ===
Ditton, Hale Village & Halebank (3 seats)
Party	Candidate	Votes	%	±%
Labour	Mike Wharton	903	66.0	
Labour	Eddie Dourley	795	58.1	
Labour	Marie Wright	745	54.4	
Conservative	Nigel Alaister Jones	354	25.9	
Turnout		1,393	26	
Labour win (new seat)				
Labour win (new seat)				
Labour win (new seat)				

=== Farnworth ===
Farnworth (3 seats)
Party	Candidate	Votes	%	±%
Labour	Angela McInerney	916	54.9	
Labour	Aimee Teeling	798	47.8	
Labour	Val Hill	763	45.7	
Conservative	Philip Harper	630	37.7	
Conservative	Ann Elizabeth Dawson	622	37.3	
Reform	Simon Hicks Caddick	183	11.0	
Turnout		1,677	27	
Labour win (new seat)				
Labour win (new seat)				
Labour win (new seat)				

=== Grange ===
Grange (3 seats)
Party	Candidate	Votes	%	±%
Labour	Joan Margaret Lowe	636	55.4	
Labour	John Bernard Abbott	634	55.2	
Labour	Mark David Dennett	567	49.3	
Conservative	Duncan James Robert Harper	201	17.5	
Conservative	Ruth Elizabeth Rowan	193	16.8	
Green	Richard Stephen Westman	189	16.4	
Liberal Democrats	Tony Dalton	165	14.4	
Liberal Democrats	Jonathan Neil Howard	108	9.4	
For Britain	Lee Urquhart	92	8.0	
Turnout		1,155	20	
Labour win (new seat)				
Labour win (new seat)				
Labour win (new seat)				

=== Halton Castle ===
Halton Castle (3 seats)
Party	Candidate	Votes	%	±%
Labour	Harry Neil Howard	669	61.5	
Labour	Ellen Cargill	635	58.4	
Labour	Christopher Martin Carlin	560	51.5	
Independent	Darrin David Whyte	234	21.5	
Conservative	Julie Powell	229	21.1	
Liberal Democrats	Laura Borne	144	13.2	
Turnout		1,097	22	
Labour win (new seat)				
Labour win (new seat)				
Labour win (new seat)				

=== Halton Lea ===
Halton Lea (3 seats)
Party	Candidate	Votes	%	±%
Labour	Kath Loftus	654	63.1	
Labour	Dave Thompson	627	60.5	
Labour	Alan Archie Lowe	590	56.9	
Conservative	Sandra Margarett Davidson	211	20.4	
Liberal Democrats	David John Woods	154	14.9	
Turnout		1,060	21	
Labour win (new seat)				
Labour win (new seat)				
Labour win (new seat)				

=== Halton View ===
Halton View (3 seats)
Party	Candidate	Votes	%	±%
Labour	Rob Polhill	764	59.0	
Labour	Tom McInerney	688	53.2	
Labour	Louise Jane Whitley	629	48.6	
Conservative	Tania Joni Clarke	325	25.1	
Reform	Jake Peter Fraser	176	13.6	
Turnout		1,303	24	
Labour win (new seat)				
Labour win (new seat)				
Labour win (new seat)				

=== Highfield ===
Highfield (3 seats)
Party	Candidate	Votes	%	±%
Labour	Andrea Marie Wall	929	70.1	
Labour	Paul Christopher Nolan	856	64.6	
Labour	Bob Gilligan	856	64.6	
Conservative	Paul David Griffiths	307	23.2	
Turnout		1,334	26	
Labour win (new seat)				
Labour win (new seat)				
Labour win (new seat)				

=== Hough Green ===
Hough Green (3 seats)
Party	Candidate	Votes	%	±%
Labour	Sandra Marie Baker	670	57.1	
Labour	Kevan Peter Wainwright	627	53.4	
Labour	Phil Harris	541	46.1	
Conservative	Lyn Ruth Nguzo	320	27.3	
Green	David Codling	182	15.5	
Reform	Liam Anthony Smith	123	10.5	
Turnout		1,177	22	
Labour win (new seat)				
Labour win (new seat)				
Labour win (new seat)				

=== Mersey & Weston ===
Mersey & Weston (3 seats)
Party	Candidate	Votes	%	±%
Labour	Victoria Begg	602	45.2	
Labour	Rosie Leck	515	38.6	
Labour	Norman Lee Plumpton-Walsh	514	38.6	
Liberal Democrats	Ernest Ratcliffe	308	23.1	
Liberal Democrats	Linda Redhead	308	23.1	
Conservative	Daniel James Baker	280	21.0	
Liberal Democrats	Joanne Allison Rowe	274	20.6	
Green	Gary Paul Cargill	255	19.1	
Conservative	Granville Spencer	203	15.2	
Turnout		1,341	22	
Labour win (new seat)				
Labour win (new seat)				
Labour win (new seat)				

=== Norton North ===
Norton North (3 seats)
Party	Candidate	Votes	%	±%
Labour	Irene Bramwell	733	46.5	
Labour	Peter Lloyd Jones	587	37.3	
Labour	Geoffrey Michael Logan	578	36.7	
Liberal Democrats	Diane Marie Inch	474	30.1	
Conservative	Adam Robert Burnett	449	28.5	
Liberal Democrats	Miriam Lorraine Hodge	416	26.4	
Green	Tracy Claire Miller	297	18.9	
Turnout		1,583	28	
Labour win (new seat)				
Labour win (new seat)				
Labour win (new seat)				

=== Norton South & Preston Brook ===
Norton South & Preston Brook (3 seats)
Party	Candidate	Votes	%	±%
Labour	Dave Cargill	611	53.5	
Labour	Tom Stretch	592	51.8	
Labour	Martha Lloyd Jones	569	49.8	
Conservative	Peter Davidson	268	23.5	
Liberal Democrats	Michael Patrick Marlow	191	16.7	
Independent	Craig Michael Wyna	183	16.0	
Liberal Democrats	Philip Lincoln Barnes	133	11.6	
Turnout		1,145	23	
Labour win (new seat)				
Labour win (new seat)				
Labour win (new seat)				

== By-elections ==
=== Halton Castle ===
Halton Castle: 25 November 2021
Party	Candidate	Votes	%	±%
Labour	Sharon Thornton	373	60.3	+7.8
Green	Iain Ferguson	117	18.9	N/A
Independent	Darrin Whyte	69	11.1	−7.2
Conservative	Danny Clarke	45	7.3	−10.7
Liberal Democrats	Tony Dalton	15	2.4	−8.9
Majority		256	41.4	
Turnout				
Labour hold		Swing	▼5.6	
