= 2006 Halton Borough Council election =

2006 UK local government election

The 2006 Halton Borough Council election took place on 4 May 2006 to elect members of Halton Unitary Council in Cheshire, England. One third of the council was up for election and the Labour Party stayed in overall control of the council.

After the election, the composition of the council was:

- Labour 35
- Liberal Democrat 13
- Conservative 8

== Campaign ==
18 seats were contested in the election with only Beechwood, Daresbury and Windmill Hill wards not having elections. Labour were defending 12 of the seats, including the seat of the current mayor Peter Lloyd-Jones, and needed to keep 7 to retain control of the council. In total there were 56 candidates, 18 each from Labour and the Conservatives, 11 Liberal Democrats, 4 Green Party, 2 Citizens Party of Halton, 2 independents and 1 from the British National Party.

Labour defended their record in control of the council saying that they had the third lowest council tax rate in North West England and were regenerating the area.

== Results ==
The results saw Labour retain control of the council after holding 11 of the 12 seats they had been defending and gaining one from the Liberal Democrats. However the Labour mayor, Peter Lloyd-Jones, lost his seat to the Conservatives in Ditton ward by 29 votes. Lloyd-Jones considered making a legal challenge to the results as exactly 29 ballots had been spoiled and he said there were "irregularities at the opening of the Hale Bank polling station". Overall turnout in the election was 26.02%.

Halton local election result 2006
Party	Seats	Gains	Losses	Net gain/loss	Seats %	Votes %	Votes	+/−
Labour	12	1	1	0	66.7	46.1	9,914	-9.2
Conservative	3	1	0	+1	16.7	26.8	5,753	+7.4
Liberal Democrats	3	0	1	-1	16.7	20.7	4,448	+1.4
Green	0	0	0	0	0.0	3.6	778	+1.1
Independent	0	0	0	0	0.0	1.3	278	+0.7
Citizens Party of Halton	0	0	0	0	0.0	0.8	173	-1.2
BNP	0	0	0	0	0.0	0.7	160	0.0

== Ward results ==
Appleton
Party	Candidate	Votes	%	±%
Labour	Susan Edge	688	67.5	
Conservative	Duncan Harper	331	32.5	
Majority		357	35.0	
Turnout		1,019	21.8	
Labour hold		Swing		

Birchfield
Party	Candidate	Votes	%	±%
Conservative	Geoffrey Swift	721	55.3	
Labour	John Fahey	422	32.4	
BNP	Andrew Taylor	160	12.3	
Majority		299	22.9	
Turnout		1,303	29.3	
Conservative hold		Swing		

Broadheath
Party	Candidate	Votes	%	±%
Labour	Keith Morley	758	64.9	
Conservative	Richard Murray	410	35.1	
Majority		348	29.8	
Turnout		1,168	24.3	
Labour hold		Swing		

Castlefields
Party	Candidate	Votes	%	±%
Labour	Ellen Cargill	448	38.5	
Liberal Democrats	Peter Blackmore	332	28.5	
Independent	Jimmy Tang	156	13.4	
Independent	George Grimes	122	10.5	
Conservative	Terence McDermott	105	9.0	
Majority		116	10.0	
Turnout		1,163	25.3	
Labour hold		Swing		

Ditton
Party	Candidate	Votes	%	±%
Conservative	Colin Rowan	722	51.0	
Labour	Peter Jones	693	49.0	
Majority		29	2.0	
Turnout		1,415	27.0	
Conservative gain from Labour		Swing		

Farnworth
Party	Candidate	Votes	%	±%
Conservative	Phillip Drakeley	919	54.7	
Labour	Margaret Fahey	458	27.3	
Liberal Democrats	Anne Curzon	187	11.1	
Green	Teresa Miller	116	6.9	
Majority		461	27.4	
Turnout		1,680	32.7	
Conservative hold		Swing		

Grange
Party	Candidate	Votes	%	±%
Labour	Mark Dennett	563	48.9	
Liberal Democrats	Shahram Mesdaghi	335	29.1	
Conservative	William Dowdle	254	22.0	
Majority		228	19.8	
Turnout		1,152	23.3	
Labour hold		Swing		

Hale
Party	Candidate	Votes	%	±%
Labour	Michael Wharton	587	78.2	+4.5
Conservative	Suzannah Swift	164	21.8	−4.5
Majority		423	56.4	+9.0
Turnout		751	48.1	
Labour hold		Swing		

Halton Brook
Party	Candidate	Votes	%	±%
Labour	John Stockton	538	50.1	
Liberal Democrats	Dianne Higginson	401	37.3	
Conservative	Patricia Parkinson	135	12.6	
Majority		137	12.8	
Turnout		1,074	22.6	
Labour gain from Liberal Democrats		Swing		

Halton Lea
Party	Candidate	Votes	%	±%
Labour	Alan Lowe	524	53.2	
Liberal Democrats	Janet Clein	293	29.7	
Conservative	Phillip Harper	97	9.8	
Citizens Party of Halton	Damian Matthews	71	7.2	
Majority		231	23.5	
Turnout		985	21.1	
Labour hold		Swing		

Halton View
Party	Candidate	Votes	%	±%
Labour	Thomas McInerney	714	42.1	
Green	Derek Mellor	428	25.3	
Liberal Democrats	Damian Curzon	297	17.5	
Conservative	Denis Thomas	256	15.1	
Majority		286	16.8	
Turnout		1,695	32.1	
Labour hold		Swing		

Heath
Party	Candidate	Votes	%	±%
Liberal Democrats	Christopher Rowe	901	55.0	
Conservative	Marjorie Bradshaw	483	29.5	
Labour	Christopher Loftus	255	15.6	
Majority		418	25.5	
Turnout		1,639	35.3	
Liberal Democrats hold		Swing		

Hough Green
Party	Candidate	Votes	%	±%
Labour	Phillip Harris	760	64.3	
Conservative	Peter Browne	422	35.7	
Majority		338	28.6	
Turnout		1,182	22.4	
Labour hold		Swing		

Kingsway
Party	Candidate	Votes	%	±%
Labour	Francis Fraser	636	65.7	
Conservative	Frank Lloyd	208	21.5	
Green	Dashmesh Shergill	124	12.8	
Majority		428	44.2	
Turnout		968	20.0	
Labour hold		Swing		

Mersey
Party	Candidate	Votes	%	±%
Liberal Democrats	Trevor Higginson	590	46.6	
Labour	Nortman Plumpton	486	38.4	
Conservative	Maureen Forsyth	190	15.0	
Majority		104	8.2	
Turnout		1,266	26.9	
Liberal Democrats hold		Swing		

Norton North
Party	Candidate	Votes	%	±%
Liberal Democrats	Phillip Worrall	706	51.6	
Labour	Joan Lowe	390	28.5	
Conservative	Mary Taylor	163	11.9	
Green	Michael Davies	110	8.0	
Majority		316	23.1	
Turnout		1,369	28.1	
Liberal Democrats hold		Swing		

Norton South
Party	Candidate	Votes	%	±%
Labour	Martha Jones	535	57.0	
Liberal Democrats	Jaynes Worrall	208	22.2	
Citizens Party of Halton	Joseph Glover	102	10.9	
Conservative	Phillip Balmer	94	10.0	
Majority		327	34.8	
Turnout		939	19.5	
Labour hold		Swing		

Riverside
Party	Candidate	Votes	%	±%
Labour	Pamela Wallace	459	62.4	
Liberal Democrats	Paul Meara	198	26.9	
Conservative	Margaret Hill	79	10.7	
Majority		261	35.5	
Turnout		736	21.2	
Labour hold		Swing		
