= 2023 Halton Borough Council election =

2023 local election in England

- 4 May 2023

18 of 54 seats on Halton Borough Council 28 seats needed for a majority
- Turnout: 23%

	First party	Second party	Third party
Leader	Mike Wharton	Margaret Ratcliffe	John Bradshaw
Party	Labour	Liberal Democrats	Conservative
Seats before	48	3	3
Seats after	49	3	2
Seat change	▲1	Steady	▼1
Popular vote	13,717	2,112	3,403
Percentage	64.4%	9.9%	16.0%
Swing	▲0.2%	▲0.3%	▼1.7%
- Winner of each seat at the 2023 Halton Borough Council election
Leader before election
Mike Wharton
Labour
Leader after election
Mike Wharton
Labour

The 2023 Halton Borough Council election took place on 4 May 2023 to elect 18 members (one-third) of Halton Borough Council in Cheshire, England. This was on the same day as other local elections across England.

Labour retained its majority on the council.

== Results ==
The results were as follows:

Halton Borough Council Election Result 2023
Party	This election			Full council			This election		
Party	Seats	Net	Seats %	Other	Total	Total %	Votes	Votes %	+/−
Labour	17	▲1	94.4	32	49	90.7	13,717	64.4	+0.2
Liberal Democrats	1	Steady	5.6	2	3	5.6	2,112	9.9	+0.3
Conservative	0	▼1	0.0	2	2	3.7	3,403	16.0	–1.7
Green	0	Steady	0.0	0	0	0.0	1,755	8.2	+3.0
Independent	0	Steady	0.0	0	0	0.0	212	1.0	–2.2
Reform	0	Steady	0.0	0	0	0.0	100	0.5	N/A

== Ward Results ==
=== Appleton ===
Appleton
Party	Candidate	Votes	%	±%
Labour	Ged Philbin	805	80.4	–4.2
Green	Vanessa Lillian Shaw	106	10.6	N/A
Conservative	Peter Richard Valentine	90	9.0	–6.4
Majority		699	69.8	
Turnout		1,001		
Labour hold				

=== Bankfield ===
Bankfield
Party	Candidate	Votes	%	±%
Labour	Louise Margaret Goodall	799	81.8	–5.0
Conservative	Ray Roberts	178	18.2	+13.0
Majority		621	63.6	
Turnout		977		
Labour hold		Swing	▼9.0	

=== Beechwood & Heath ===
Beechwood & Heath
Party	Candidate	Votes	%	±%
Liberal Democrats	Christopher Rowe	966	51.5	+3.6
Labour	Louise Jane Whitley	603	32.1	+2.1
Conservative	Danny Clarke	308	16.4	–1.1
Majority		363	19.4	
Turnout		1,877		
Liberal Democrats hold		Swing	▲0.8	

=== Birchfield ===
Birchfield
Party	Candidate	Votes	%	±%
Labour	Bill Woolfall	912	61.5	+11.6
Conservative	Ann Elizabeth Dawson	357	24.1	–13.4
Liberal Democrats	Andrew Peter Teebay	215	14.5	+7.8
Majority		555	37.4	
Turnout		1,484		
Labour hold		Swing	▲12.5	

=== Bridgewater ===
Bridgewater
Party	Candidate	Votes	%	±%
Labour	Carol Patricia Plumpton Walsh	843	69.8	–4.8
Conservative	Shaun Peter Kelly	151	12.5	–2.2
Green	Christopher Neil Sankey	116	9.6	N/A
Liberal Democrats	Suzanne Nicola Howard	97	8.0	–2.7
Majority		692	57.3	
Turnout		1,207		
Labour hold		Swing	▼1.3	

=== Central & West Bank ===
Central & West Bank
Party	Candidate	Votes	%	±%
Labour	Stan Hill	431	59.9	–25.8
Green	Anthony Thomas McMullin	189	26.3	N/A
Reform	Jake Peter Fraser	100	13.9	N/A
Majority		242	33.6	
Turnout		720		
Labour hold				

=== Daresbury, Moore & Sandymoor ===
Daresbury, Moore & Sandymoor
Party	Candidate	Votes	%	±%
Labour	Mike Ryan	531	41.5	+7.4
Green	Andrew Dyer	343	26.8	–5.0
Conservative	Marjorie Bradshaw	336	26.2	–7.9
Liberal Democrats	John Segrue Secker	71	5.5	N/A
Majority		188	14.7	
Turnout		1,281		
Labour gain from Conservative		Swing	▲6.2	

=== Ditton, Hale Village & Halebank ===
Ditton, Hale Village & Halebank
Party	Candidate	Votes	%	±%
Labour	Eddie Dourley	819	79.7	–0.5
Conservative	Phil Harper	208	20.3	+0.5
Majority		611	59.4	
Turnout		1,027		
Labour hold		Swing	▼0.5	

=== Farnworth ===
Farnworth
Party	Candidate	Votes	%	±%
Labour	Aimee Skinner	1,044	70.4	+5.6
Conservative	Colleen Mary Harper	439	29.6	–5.6
Majority		605	40.8	
Turnout		1,483		
Labour hold		Swing	▲5.6	

=== Grange ===
Grange
Party	Candidate	Votes	%	±%
Labour	John Bernard Abbott	696	67.5	–10.7
Conservative	Thomas Peter Moss	130	12.6	N/A
Liberal Democrats	Jonathan Neil Howard	103	10.0	–11.8
Independent	Daniel Baker	102	9.9	N/A
Majority		566	54.9	
Turnout		1,031		
Labour hold				

=== Halton Castle ===
Halton Castle
Party	Candidate	Votes	%	±%
Labour	Chris Loftus	691	66.6	+3.6
Green	Iain James Ferguson	125	12.1	–5.3
Independent	Darrin David Whyte	110	10.6	–1.2
Conservative	Dylan Anthony Eaton	70	6.8	–0.9
Liberal Democrats	Joe Haddock	41	4.0	N/A
Majority		566	54.5	
Turnout		1,037		
Labour hold		Swing	▲4.5	

=== Halton Lea ===
Halton Lea
Party	Candidate	Votes	%	±%
Labour	Dave Thompson	761	75.9	+0.1
Conservative	Sandra Margarett Davidson	116	11.6	±0.0
Green	Michael James O'Day	83	8.3	+0.6
Liberal Democrats	David John Woods	43	4.3	–0.7
Majority		645	64.3	
Turnout		1,003		
Labour hold		Swing	▲0.1	

=== Halton View ===
Halton View
Party	Candidate	Votes	%	±%
Labour	Tom McInerney	850	71.9	–8.2
Green	Derek William Mellor	170	14.4	N/A
Conservative	Matthew Paul Roth	162	13.7	–6.2
Majority		680	57.5	
Turnout		1,182		
Labour hold				

=== Highfield ===
Highfield
Party	Candidate	Votes	%	±%
Labour	Paul Christopher Nolan	948	77.3	+2.4
Conservative	Austin Clarke	146	11.9	–1.9
Green	Ashlee Brown	133	10.8	N/A
Majority		802	65.4	
Turnout		1,227		
Labour hold		Swing	▲2.2	

=== Hough Green ===
Hough Green
Party	Candidate	Votes	%	±%
Labour	Kevan Peter Wainwright	761	70.2	–2.3
Conservative	David James Dorian	199	18.4	+1.1
Green	Philip John Beale	124	11.4	+1.3
Majority		562	51.8	
Turnout		1,084		
Labour hold		Swing	▼1.7	

=== Mersey & Weston ===
Mersey & Weston
Party	Candidate	Votes	%	±%
Labour	Rosie Leck	720	59.7	+3.0
Liberal Democrats	Joanne Allison Rowe	252	20.9	–4.0
Conservative	Claire Louise Roth	134	11.1	–0.5
Green	Sariel Arjona	100	8.3	N/A
Majority		468	38.8	
Turnout		1,206		
Labour hold		Swing	▲3.5	

=== Norton North ===
Norton North
Party	Candidate	Votes	%	±%
Labour	Peter Lloyd Jones	786	54.8	+7.9
Liberal Democrats	Diane Marie Inch	261	18.2	+2.1
Conservative	Adam Robert Burnett	197	13.7	+2.8
Green	Matthew Thomas Healey	191	13.3	–5.7
Majority		525	36.6	
Turnout		1,435		
Labour hold		Swing	▲2.9	

=== Norton South & Preston Brook ===
Norton South & Preston Brook
Party	Candidate	Votes	%	±%
Labour	Thomas Stretch	717	69.1	–1.9
Conservative	Peter Davidson	182	17.6	+2.4
Green	Tracy Claire Miller	75	7.2	N/A
Liberal Democrats	Miriam Lorraine Hodge	63	6.1	–0.8
Majority		535	51.5	
Turnout		1,037		
Labour hold		Swing	▼2.2	
