= 2002 Halton Borough Council election =

2002 UK local government election

The 2002 Halton Borough Council election took place on 2 May 2002 to elect members of Halton Unitary Council in Cheshire, England. One third of the council was up for election and the Labour Party stayed in overall control of the council.

After the election, the composition of the council was:

- Labour 47
- Liberal Democrat 7
- Conservative 2

== Campaign ==
18 seats were contested in the election, including 2 seats in Norton ward, where a Labour councillor had resigned his seat. The seats being contested included those of the Labour mayor, Chris Loftus, and the Liberal Democrat leader on the council, Alan Taylor. 47 candidates stood in the election, including 3 married couples, with Labour contesting seats in all 17 wards, as compared to 14 for the Conservatives, 9 for the Liberal Democrats and 2 from the Runcorn Labour Councillors Group.

Major issues in the election included housing, concerns over health effects from a local chemical plant and a proposal to close down a recreation centre in Norton. The council was dominated by Labour before the election and this was seen as unlikely to change.

== Results ==
The results saw Labour increase its majority on the council by gaining 3 seats to have 47 councillors, while the Runcorn Labour Councillors Group lost their 2 remaining seats. However the Liberal Democrats won an extra seat in Norton ward to remain the main opposition with 7 seats. Overall turnout in the election was 21.5%.

Halton local election result 2002
| Party | Seats | Gains | Losses | Net gain/loss | Seats % | Votes % | Votes | +/− |
|---|---|---|---|---|---|---|---|---|
| Labour | 15 | | | +2 | 83.3 | 59.1 | 11,919 | |
| Liberal Democrats | 3 | | | +1 | 16.7 | 20.4 | 4,116 | |
| Conservative | 0 | | | 0 | 0.0 | 17.5 | 3,526 | |
| Independent | 0 | | | -1 | 0.0 | 1.6 | 315 | |
| Runcorn Labour Councillors Group | 0 | | | -2 | 0.0 | 1.5 | 300 | |

== Ward results ==
Appleton
| Party | Candidate | Votes | % | ±% |
|---|---|---|---|---|
| Labour | Gerald Philbin | 707 | 79.0 | |
| Conservative | Janet Edge | 188 | 21.0 | |
| Majority | | 519 | 58.0 | |
| Turnout | | 895 | | |

Broadheath
| Party | Candidate | Votes | % | ±% |
|---|---|---|---|---|
| Labour | Robert Gilligan | 898 | 81.0 | |
| Conservative | David Lewis | 210 | 19.0 | |
| Majority | | 688 | 62.0 | |
| Turnout | | 1,108 | | |

Castlefields
| Party | Candidate | Votes | % | ±% |
|---|---|---|---|---|
| Labour | Liam Temple | 671 | 69.4 | |
| Liberal Democrats | Sean Casey | 296 | 30.6 | |
| Majority | | 375 | 38.8 | |
| Turnout | | 967 | | |

Ditton
| Party | Candidate | Votes | % | ±% |
|---|---|---|---|---|
| Labour | Shaun Osborne | 850 | 71.9 | |
| Conservative | Gillian Hensley | 332 | 28.1 | |
| Majority | | 518 | 43.8 | |
| Turnout | | 1,182 | | |

Farnworth
| Party | Candidate | Votes | % | ±% |
|---|---|---|---|---|
| Labour | David Reynolds | 909 | 54.3 | |
| Conservative | Philip Balmer | 765 | 45.7 | |
| Majority | | 144 | 8.6 | |
| Turnout | | 1,674 | | |

Grange
| Party | Candidate | Votes | % | ±% |
|---|---|---|---|---|
| Labour | Stephen Pearsall | 586 | 62.3 | |
| Liberal Democrats | James Maguire | 188 | 20.0 | |
| Conservative | William Denton | 166 | 17.7 | |
| Majority | | 398 | 42.3 | |
| Turnout | | 940 | | |

Hale
| Party | Candidate | Votes | % | ±% |
|---|---|---|---|---|
| Labour | Michael Wharton | 422 | 57.3 | |
| Independent | Agnes Mitchell | 315 | 42.7 | |
| Majority | | 107 | 14.6 | |
| Turnout | | 737 | | |
| Labour gain from Independent | | Swing | | |

Halton
| Party | Candidate | Votes | % | ±% |
|---|---|---|---|---|
| Labour | Stanley Hill | 784 | 74.2 | |
| Conservative | Denis Thomas | 273 | 25.8 | |
| Majority | | 511 | 48.4 | |
| Turnout | | 1,057 | | |

Halton Brook
| Party | Candidate | Votes | % | ±% |
|---|---|---|---|---|
| Labour | John Massey | 723 | 63.5 | |
| Liberal Democrats | Trevor Higginson | 316 | 27.7 | |
| Conservative | Roger Tuson | 100 | 8.8 | |
| Majority | | 407 | 35.8 | |
| Turnout | | 1,139 | | |

Heath
| Party | Candidate | Votes | % | ±% |
|---|---|---|---|---|
| Liberal Democrats | Alan Taylor | 1,128 | 58.1 | |
| Conservative | Marjorie Bradshaw | 507 | 26.1 | |
| Labour | Dorothy Fahey | 305 | 15.7 | |
| Majority | | 621 | 32.0 | |
| Turnout | | 1,940 | | |

Hough Green
| Party | Candidate | Votes | % | ±% |
|---|---|---|---|---|
| Labour | Paul Nolan | 767 | 72.6 | |
| Conservative | Maureen Forsyth | 156 | 14.8 | |
| Liberal Democrats | Frances Jump | 133 | 12.6 | |
| Majority | | 611 | 57.8 | |
| Turnout | | 1,056 | | |

Kingsway
| Party | Candidate | Votes | % | ±% |
|---|---|---|---|---|
| Labour | Valerie Hill | 823 | 79.7 | |
| Conservative | Frank Lloyd | 209 | 20.3 | |
| Majority | | 614 | 59.4 | |
| Turnout | | 1,032 | | |

Mersey
| Party | Candidate | Votes | % | ±% |
|---|---|---|---|---|
| Labour | Christopher Loftus | 510 | 48.0 | |
| Liberal Democrats | Christopher Rowe | 431 | 40.6 | |
| Conservative | Colin Keam | 121 | 11.4 | |
| Majority | | 79 | 7.4 | |
| Turnout | | 1,062 | | |
| Labour hold | | Swing | | |

Murdishaw
| Party | Candidate | Votes | % | ±% |
|---|---|---|---|---|
| Labour | Mary Massey | 537 | 73.7 | |
| Liberal Democrats | Sue France | 192 | 26.3 | |
| Majority | | 345 | 47.4 | |
| Turnout | | 729 | | |

Norton (2)
| Party | Candidate | Votes | % | ±% |
|---|---|---|---|---|
| Liberal Democrats | Timothy Sly | 654 | | |
| Liberal Democrats | Diane Inch | 644 | | |
| Labour | Alban Boyle | 630 | | |
| Labour | Annette Lyons | 472 | | |
| Conservative | Alan McKie | 121 | | |
| Conservative | Barbara Price | 115 | | |
| Runcorn Labour Councillors Group | Michael Gelling | 85 | | |
| Runcorn Labour Councillors Group | Joseph Glover | 72 | | |
| Turnout | | 2,793 | | |

Palacefields
| Party | Candidate | Votes | % | ±% |
|---|---|---|---|---|
| Labour | Kathleen Loftus | 639 | 63.0 | |
| Runcorn Labour Councillors Group | William Murphy | 143 | 14.1 | |
| Liberal Democrats | Janet Clein | 134 | 13.2 | |
| Conservative | David Masheder | 98 | 9.7 | |
| Majority | | 496 | 48.9 | |
| Turnout | | 1,014 | | |

Riverside
| Party | Candidate | Votes | % | ±% |
|---|---|---|---|---|
| Labour | Francis Nyland | 686 | 80.6 | |
| Conservative | Margaret Hill | 165 | 19.4 | |
| Majority | | 521 | 61.2 | |
| Turnout | | 851 | | |
