= 2011 Halton Borough Council election =

2011 UK local government election

Results of the 2011 Halton Borough Council election

The 2011 Halton Borough Council election took place on 5 May 2011 to elect members of Halton Unitary Council in Cheshire, England. One third of the council was up for election and the Labour Party stayed in overall control of the council.

After the election, the composition of the council was:

- Labour 44
- Liberal Democrat 6
- Conservative 3
- Independent 3

== Ward results ==
Appleton
Party	Candidate	Votes	%	±%
Labour	Ged Philbin	1197	84.4	+17.2
Conservative	Geoffrey Swift	222	15.6	+0.4
Turnout				
Labour hold		Swing		

Beechwood
Party	Candidate	Votes	%	±%
Labour	Christopher Loftus	521	37.4	
Liberal Democrats	Ulfar Norddahl	500	35.9	
Conservative	Keith Davies	371	26.7	
Majority		21	1.5	
Turnout				
Labour gain from Liberal Democrats		Swing		

Birchfield
Party	Candidate	Votes	%	±%
Labour	Sandra Baker	1072	57.1	
Conservative	David Findon	804	42.9	
Majority		251	14.2	
Turnout				
Labour gain from Conservative		Swing		

Broadheath
Party	Candidate	Votes	%	±%
Labour	Robert Gilligan	1220	79.0	
Conservative	Ruth Rowan	244	15.8	
Liberal Democrats	Geoff Brown	81	5.2	
Majority		976	63.2	
Turnout				
Labour hold		Swing		

Daresbury
Party	Candidate	Votes	%	±%
Conservative	John Bradshaw	727	53.8	
Labour	Mike Eakins	463	34.2	
Liberal Democrats	Joanne King	162	12.0	
Majority		264	19.6	
Turnout				
Conservative hold		Swing		

Ditton
Party	Candidate	Votes	%	±%
Labour	Shaun Osborne	1372	73.5	
Conservative	Richard Murray	495	26.5	
Majority				
Turnout				
Labour hold		Swing		

Farnworth
Party	Candidate	Votes	%	±%
Labour	Angela McInerney	1256	57.0	
Conservative	Richard Murray	948	43.0	
Majority				
Turnout				
Labour gain from Conservative		Swing		

Grange
Party	Candidate	Votes	%	±%
Labour	Angela McInerney	1004	71.9	
Liberal Democrats	Gareth Stockton	393	28.1	
Majority				
Turnout				
Labour hold		Swing		

Halton Brook
Party	Candidate	Votes	%	±%
Labour	Carol Walsh	991	63.4	
Independent	Peter Cumpper	323	20.7	
Liberal Democrats	Patricia Parkinson	250	16.0	
Majority		668	42.7	
Turnout				
Labour gain from Liberal Democrats		Swing		

Halton Castle
Party	Candidate	Votes	%	±%
Labour	Arthur Cole	1067	70.1	
Independent	Janet Clein	281	18.5	
Liberal Democrats	Simon Charlesworth	175	11.5	
Majority				
Turnout				
Labour gain from Liberal Democrats		Swing		

Halton Lea
Party	Candidate	Votes	%	±%
Labour	Katherine Loftus	1228	80.6	
Conservative	Anthony Dalton	200	13.1	
Liberal Democrats	Marina Thornhill	96	6.3	
Majority		319	18.7	
Turnout		1,698	32.0	−0.1
Labour hold		Swing		

Halton View
Party	Candidate	Votes	%	±%
Labour	Stan Parker	1508	79.4	
Conservative	Paul Docherty	391	20.6	
Majority				
Turnout				
Labour hold		Swing		

Heath
Party	Candidate	Votes	%	±%
Liberal Democrats	Margaret Ratcliffe	856	44.1	
Labour	Pauline Hignett	698	35.9	
Conservative	Bill Ring	388	20.0	
Majority		158	8.2	
Turnout				
Liberal Democrats hold		Swing		

Hough Green
Party	Candidate	Votes	%	±%
Labour	Kevan Wainwright	1391	77.4	
Conservative	Paul Griffiths	405	22.6	
Majority		986	54.8	
Turnout				
Labour hold		Swing		

Kingsway
Party	Candidate	Votes	%	±%
Labour	Frank Fraser	unopposed		

Mersey
Party	Candidate	Votes	%	±%
Labour	Norman Walsh	984	62.6	
Liberal Democrats	Ernest Ratcliffe	589	37.4	
Majority		395	24.2	
Turnout				
Labour gain from Liberal Democrats		Swing		

Norton North
Party	Candidate	Votes	%	±%
Labour	Geoff Zygadllo	850	48.7	
Liberal Democrats	Diane Inch	429	35.1	
Conservative	Kay Alexander	281	16.1	
Majority		421	13.6	
Turnout				
Labour gain from Liberal Democrats		Swing		

Norton South
Party	Candidate	Votes	%	±%
Labour	David Cargill	1233	84.8	
Conservative	Pam Bleasdale	137	9.5	
Liberal Democrats	Andrew Whitley	82	5.7	
Majority		1096	75.3	
Turnout				
Labour hold		Swing		

Riverside
Party	Candidate	Votes	%	±%
Labour	Pamela Wallace	843	82.8	
Liberal Democrats	Paul Meara	175	17.2	
Majority		668	65.6	
Turnout				
Labour hold		Swing		
