= Westminster (disambiguation) =

Westminster is an area of London, England.

Westminster may also refer to:

== Arts, entertainment and media ==
- Westminster Records, an American classical music record label
- The Westminster Review, a journal for philosophical radicals, sometimes known simply as the Westminster
- Westminster (Presbyterian periodical)
- Westminster (painting), an 1875 work by Giuseppe De Nittis

== Educational establishments ==
- Westminster Academy (disambiguation)
- Westminster College (disambiguation)
- Westminster High School (disambiguation)
- Westminster School (disambiguation)
- Westminster Seminary California, US
- Westminster Theological Seminary, Pennsylvania, US
- Westminster University (disambiguation)
- University of Westminster, London, England
  - Westminster Law School

== Government ==
- Westminster, a metonym for the Government of the United Kingdom
  - Parliament of the United Kingdom
  - Palace of Westminster, the home of the Houses of Parliament
  - Westminster system, a parliamentary system of government modelled after the United Kingdom

== Places ==
=== United Kingdom ===
- City of Westminster, a London borough with city status in Greater London, England
  - Westminster (UK Parliament constituency), 1545–1918
  - Westminster District, 1855–1887, later Westminster St Margaret and St John
  - City and Liberty of Westminster, 1585–1900
  - Metropolitan Borough of Westminster, 1900–1965
  - Westminster (London County Council constituency), 1889–1919
- Westminster, Ellesmere Port, Cheshire, England
- Westminster (Liverpool ward), England

=== Canada ===
- Westminster (electoral district), British Columbia 1890–1894, based around Fraser Valley
  - Westminster District (federal electoral district) 1917–1921
- Westminster, Middlesex County, Ontario
- Westminster, Alfred and Plantagenet, Ontario

=== United States ===
- Westminster, California
- Westminster, Colorado
- Westminster, Louisiana
- Westminster, Maryland
  - Westminster Historic District
- Westminster, Massachusetts
- Westminster, Michigan
- Westminster, Ohio
- Westminster, South Carolina
- Westminster, Texas
- Westminster (town), Vermont
- Westminster (village), Vermont

=== Elsewhere ===
- Westminster, Western Australia, a suburb of Perth, Australia
- Westminster, South Africa
- Mount Westminster, a mountain in Supporters Range, Antarctica

== Transportation ==
- Austin Westminster, a British car from 1954
- HMS Westminster, the name of several ships
- Westminster, later MV Star of Malta, a former patrol yacht converted into commercial service
- Westminster, a steam locomotive of the Northampton and Lamport Railway
- Westminster station (South Carolina), US
- Westminster station (RTD), Westminster, Colorado, US
- Westminster tube station, in central London, England
- Westland Westminster, a 1950s British helicopter

== Other uses ==
- Westminster (Evanston, Illinois), US, an apartment building
- Westminster (typeface), inspired by numbers printed on cheques
- Duke of Westminster, a title in the Peerage of the United Kingdom

== See also ==
- New Westminster (disambiguation)
- Statute of Westminster (disambiguation)
- Treaty of Westminster (disambiguation)
- Westminster Abbey (disambiguation)
- Westminster Catechism (disambiguation)
- Westminster Council (disambiguation)
- Westminster Presbyterian Church (disambiguation)
- Archdiocese of Westminster, an archdiocese of the Catholic Church in Westminster, London, England
  - Archbishop of Westminster
