= 1981 Merseyside County Council election =

1981 UK local government election

- 7 May 1981

All 99 seats on Merseyside County Council 50 seats needed for a majority
- Turnout: 36.9% (▲1.3%)
	First party	Second party	Third party
	Blank	Blank	Blank
Party	Labour	Conservative	Liberal
Last election	26 seats, 27.4%	67 seats, 55.1%	6 seats, 16.3%
Seats before	26	67	6
Seats won	57	27	15
Seat change	▲31	▼40	▲9
Popular vote	190,757	122,050	100,218
Percentage	45.8%	29.3%	24.1%
Swing	▲18.4%	▼25.8%	▲7.8%
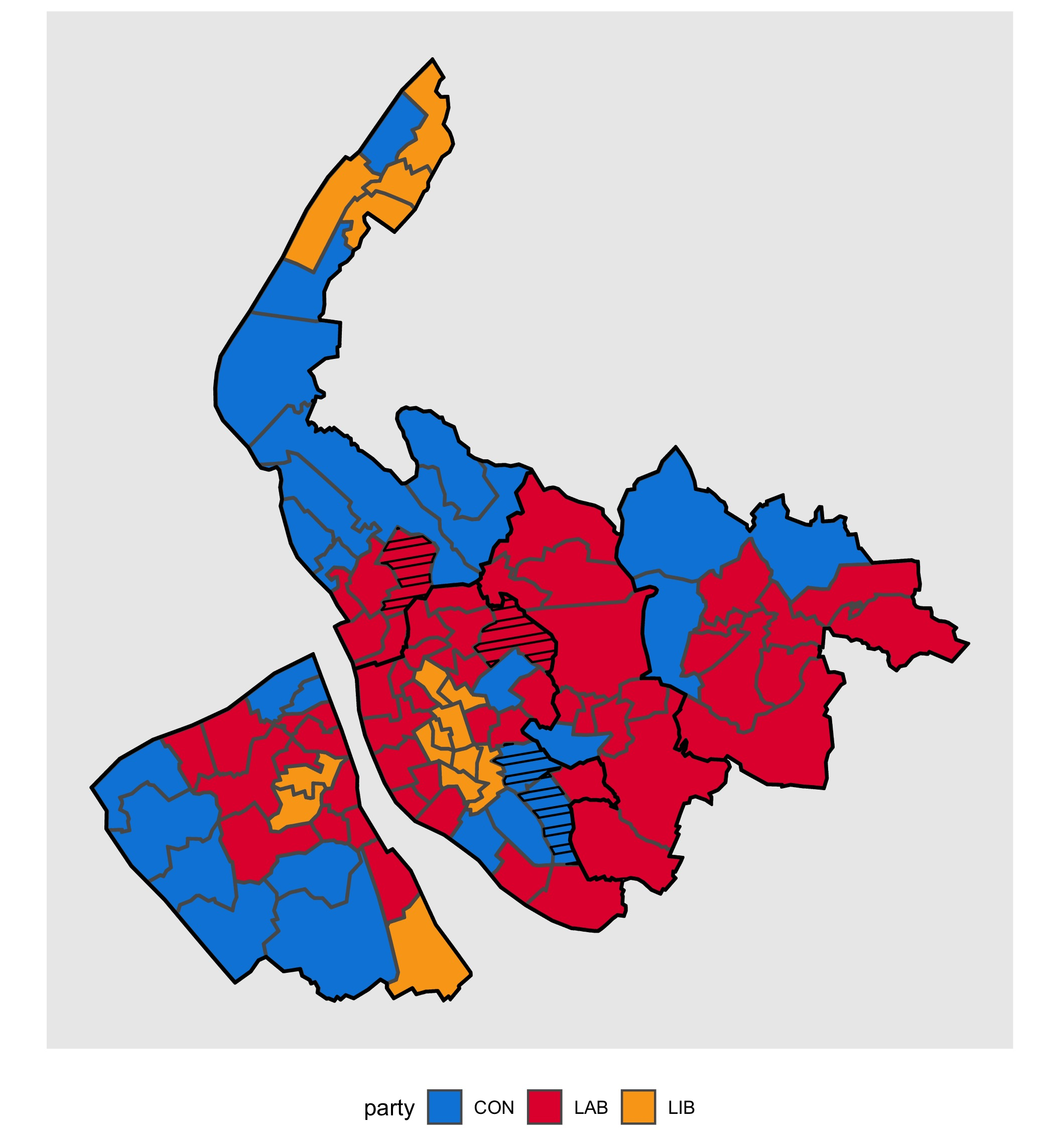
- Map of Merseyside County Council showing wards won by party
Control of Council before election
Conservative
Control of Council after election
Labour

The 1981 Merseyside County Council election took place on 7 May to elect members of Merseyside County Council in England. This was on the same day as other local elections.

Merseyside County Council was abolished in 1986.

== Election results ==
=== Overall election result ===
Overall result compared with 1977.

Merseyside County Council election, 1981
Party	Candidates				Votes		
Party	Stood	Elected	Net	% of total	%	№	Net %
Labour	97	57	▲31	57.6	45.8	190,757	▲18.4
Conservative	99	27	▼40	27.3	29.3	122,050	▼25.8
Liberal	88	15	▲9	15.2	24.1	100,218	▲7.8
Residents	2	0	0	0.0	0.4	1,728	N/A
Ecology	2	0	0	0.0	0.1	585	New
Communist	7	0	0	0.0	0.1	545	▼0.5
British Democratic	2	0	0	0.0	0.1	264	New
Independent	1	0	0	0.0	0.0	184	▼0.1
Independent Liberal	1	0	0	0.0	0.0	61	0.0

=== Results by borough ===
==== Knowsley ====
Merseyside County Council election, 1981 (Knowsley)
Party	Candidates				Votes		
Party	Stood	Elected	Net	% of total	%	№	Net %
Labour	11	10	▲3	90.9	68.5	27,110	▲23.7
Conservative	11	1	▼3	9.1	18.6	7,350	▼29.9
Liberal	9	0	0	0.0	13.0	5,136	▲9.6

Turnout: 31.9% (▲2.1%)

==== Liverpool ====
Merseyside County Council election, 1981 (Liverpool)
Party	Candidates				Votes		
Party	Stood	Elected	Net	% of total	%	№	Net %
Labour	36	21	▲11	58.3	46.9	67,144	▲18.7
Liberal	36	8	▲5	22.2	30.9	44,273	▲7.4
Conservative	36	7	▼16	19.4	21.7	31,057	▼25.3
Communist	7	0	0	0.0	0.4	545	▼0.5
Independent Liberal	1	0	0	0.0	0.0	61	▼0.1

Turnout: 37.1% (▲3.2%)

==== Sefton ====
Merseyside County Council election, 1981 (Sefton)
Party	Candidates				Votes		
Party	Stood	Elected	Net	% of total	%	№	Net %
Conservative	19	9	▼6	47.4	38.1	31,108	▼25.6
Labour	17	6	▲3	31.6	34.4	28,070	▲14.2
Liberal	15	4	▲3	21.1	24.8	20,190	▲10.1
Residents	2	0	0	0.0	2.1	1,728	N/A
Ecology	1	0	0	0.0	0.6	474	New

Turnout: 36.6% (▲2.6)

==== St Helens ====
Merseyside County Council election, 1981 (St Helens)
Party	Candidates				Votes		
Party	Stood	Elected	Net	% of total	%	№	Net %
Labour	11	9	▲6	81.8	56.8	28,191	▲20.4
Conservative	11	2	▼6	18.2	26.6	13,172	▼31.4
Liberal	8	0	0	0.0	16.2	8,061	▲10.6
Independent	1	0	0	0.0	0.4	184	N/A

Turnout: 35.7% (▼1.6%)

==== Wirral ====
Merseyside County Council election, 1981 (Wirral)
Party	Candidates				Votes		
Party	Stood	Elected	Net	% of total	%	№	Net %
Labour	22	11	▲8	50.0	39.2	40,242	▲18.1
Conservative	22	8	▼9	36.4	38.4	39,363	▼22.0
Liberal	20	3	▲1	13.6	22.0	22,558	▲4.0
British Democratic	2	0	0	0.0	0.3	264	New
Ecology	1	0	0	0.0	0.1	111	New

Turnout: 39.9% (▼1.9%)

== Ward results ==
Results compared directly with the last local election in 1977.

== Knowsley ==
=== Huyton With Roby No. 1 (Huyton Farm, Princess & Woolfall) ===
Huyton With Roby No. 1 (Huyton Farm, Princess & Woolfall)
Party	Candidate	Votes	%	±%
Labour	P. Longfall *	2,116	91%	▲31%
Conservative	A. Simpson	210	9%	▼31%
Majority		1,906		▲
Registered electors		9,165		
Turnout		2,346	25.6	▲5.1
Rejected ballots				
Labour hold		Swing	▲31	

=== Huyton With Roby No. 2 (Longview and Rupert Farm) ===
Huyton With Roby No. 2 (Longview and Rupert Farm)
Party	Candidate	Votes	%	±%
Labour	J. Maguire	1,891	65%	
Conservative	J. E. Easthope	560	19%	
Liberal	D. Cottier	439	15%	
Majority		1,331		
Registered electors		9,072		
Turnout		2,894	32	
Rejected ballots				
Labour hold		Swing		

=== Huyton With Roby No. 3 (St. Agnes, St. Bartholomews & Swanside) ===
Huyton With Roby No. 3 (St. Agnes, St. Bartholomews & Swanside)
Party	Candidate	Votes	%	±%
Conservative	W. J. Simpson *	1,982	43%	
Labour	E. O'Hara	1,816	39%	
Liberal	L. Cottier	805	17%	
Majority		166		
Registered electors		13,599		
Turnout		4,610	34%	
Rejected ballots		7		
Conservative hold		Swing		

=== Huyton With Roby No. 4 (St. Gabriels & St. Michaels) ===
Huyton With Roby No. 4 (St. Gabriels & St. Michaels)
Party	Candidate	Votes	%	±%
Labour	S. S. Powell *	2,150	67%	
Liberal	J. Melia	518	16%	
Conservative	P. Forrester	517	16%	
Majority		1,632		
Registered electors		11,211		
Turnout		3,195	28%	
Rejected ballots		10		
Labour hold		Swing		

=== Kirkby No. 1 (Central Kirkby and Minstead) ===
Kirkby No. 1 (Central Kirkby and Minstead)
Party	Candidate	Votes	%	±%
Labour	J. King *	2,269	79	▲22.9
Liberal	S. Welsh	495	17	▲3.5
Conservative	K. Johnson	100	3	▼21.3
Majority		1,774	31.8	▼6.4
Registered electors		9,231		
Turnout		2,864	31	
Labour hold		Swing		

=== Kirkby No. 2 (Cherryfield and Whitfield) ===
Kirkby No. 2 (Cherryfield and Whitfield)
Party	Candidate	Votes	%	±%
Labour	J. Gallagher *	2,577	72%	▲26.8
Liberal	G. Sealey	741	21%	▲4.7
Conservative	J. Carraher	246	7%	▼27.8
Majority		325	10.4	▼4.2
Registered electors		11,167		
Turnout		3,573	32%	▲3.9
Labour hold		Swing	▲4.7	

=== Kirkby No. 3 (Northwood-Park-Tower Hill-Simonswood) ===
Kirkby No. 3 (Northwood-Park-Tower Hill-Simonswood)
Party	Candidate	Votes	%	±%
Labour	G. Bundred	1,983	52.5	▼20.1
Conservative	C. Baily	1,187	31.4	▲12.4
Liberal	J. Smith	413	10.9	New
Communist	T. Bradburn	194	5.1	▼3.4
Majority		796	21.1	▼32.5
Registered electors		15,378		
Turnout		3,777	24.6	▲3.9
Labour hold		Swing	▼16.3	

=== Prescot ===
Prescot
Party	Candidate	Votes	%	±%
Conservative	W. Hughes	1,888	57.7	▲18.9
Labour	W. Howarth	1,386	42.3	▼18.9
Majority		502	15.4	N/A
Registered electors		8,654		
Turnout			37.9	▼4.8
Conservative gain from Labour		Swing	▲18.9	

=== Whiston No. 1 (Croton-Tarbock-Whiston) ===
Whiston No. 1 (Croton-Tarbock-Whiston)
Party	Candidate	Votes	%	±%
Labour	R. Foulkes	1,444	40.1	▼25.5
Conservative	S. Pyne	1,390	38.6	▲4.2
Ind. Conservative	B. Jeffrey	765	21.3	New
Majority		54	1.5	▼29.7
Registered electors		11,132		
Turnout			32.6	▼2.2
Labour hold		Swing	▼14.9	

=== Whiston No. 3 (Halewood) ===
Whiston No. 3 (Halewood)
Party	Candidate	Votes	%	±%
Conservative	J. Sinclair	2,488	54.3	▲26.7
Labour	J. Bohanna	2,094	45.7	▼26.7
Majority		394	8.6	▼36.2
Registered electors		14,426		
Turnout			31.8	▼2.5
Conservative gain from Labour		Swing	▲26.7	

=== Whiston No. 4 (Knowsley) ===
Whiston No. 4 (Knowsley)
Party	Candidate	Votes	%	±%
Labour	W. Alldritt	1,618	51.3	▼19.5
Conservative	T. Maudsley	1,533	48.7	▲29.4
Majority		85	2.6	▼48.9
Registered electors		11,914		
Turnout			26.5	▼1.2
Labour hold		Swing	▼24.5	

== Liverpool ==
=== Liverpool No.1 (Abercromby & St. James) ===
Liverpool No.1 (Abercromby & St. James)
Party	Candidate	Votes	%	±%
Labour	O. Doyle	2,049	54%	▼3.4
Liberal	Chris Davies	1,437	38%	▲32.1
Communist	R.O'Hara	158	4%	▲
Conservative	P.M.Cawson	148	4%	▼6
Majority		612	16.8	▼17.8
Registered electors		11,504		
Turnout		3,814	33%	▼14
Labour hold		Swing	▼3.4	

=== Liverpool No.2 (Aigburth) ===
Liverpool No.2 Aigburth
Party	Candidate	Votes	%	±%
Conservative	S. T. Moss *	2,968	49%	▼24
Liberal	G. P. Scott	1,826	30%	▲14.9
Labour	B. Smart	1,201	20%	▲9.6
Majority		1,142	19	▼38.8
Registered electors		14,746		
Turnout		6,002	41%	▼6.7
Conservative hold		Swing	▼24	

=== Liverpool No.3 (Allerton) ===
Liverpool No.3 (Allerton)
Party	Candidate	Votes	%	±%
Conservative	W. S. D. Weaver *	2,189	49%	▼24
Labour	M. O'Neill	1,180	27%	▲14.2
Liberal	N. G. Chinn	1,053	24%	▲9.9
Majority		1,009	22.8	▼9
Registered electors		10,698		
Turnout		4,429	41.4%	▼1.8
Conservative hold		Swing	▼24	

=== Liverpool No.4 (Anfield) ===
Liverpool No.4 (Anfield)
Party	Candidate	Votes	%	±%
Liberal	Carole M. Cartmell	2,225	44%	▲25.1
Labour	J. E. Roberts	1,848	36%	▲4.2
Conservative	T. P. Pink	1,025	20%	▼29.3
Majority		377	7.4	▼10.1
Registered electors		12,478		
Turnout		5,104	40.9%	▲3.8
Liberal gain from Conservative		Swing	▲29.3	

=== Liverpool No.5 (Arundel) ===
Liverpool No.5 (Arundel)
Party	Candidate	Votes	%	±%
Liberal	Roger Johnston	1,745	39.5%	▲6.3
Labour	R. J. Quick	1,713	38.7%	▲28.4
Conservative	H. A. Quayle	857	19.4%	▼23.3
Communist	J. C. Blevin	85	1.9%	▼2.0
Majority		33		▼
Registered electors		12,115		
Turnout		4,422	36.5%	▲3.2
Liberal gain from Conservative		Swing	▲29.6	

=== Liverpool No.6 (Breckfield & St. Domingo) ===
Liverpool No.6 (Breckfield & St. Domingo)
Party	Candidate	Votes	%	±%
Labour	J. Brazier	1,884	48.6%	▲17.8
Liberal	F. McNevin	1,708	44.0%	▲15.4
Conservative	Pauline Dougherty	276	7.1%	▼33.5
Majority		176		▼
Registered electors		11,179		
Turnout		3,879	34.7%	▲2.3
Labour gain from Conservative		Swing	▲51.3	

=== Liverpool No.7 (Broadgreen) ===
Liverpool No.7 (Broadgreen)
Party	Candidate	Votes	%	±%
Labour	B. Wright	1,660	37.3	▼8.0
Liberal	G. L. Holmes	1,651	37.1	▼1.8
Conservative	R. D. Oughton	1,134	25.5%	▲9.8
Majority		9	0.02	▼6.38
Registered electors		11,833		
Turnout		4,449	37.6%	▼1.9
Labour hold		Swing	▼8.0	

=== Liverpool No.8 (Central & Everton) ===
Liverpool No.8 (Central & Everton)
Party	Candidate	Votes	%	±%
Labour	K. C. Coombes	2,565	86.1%	▲24.5
Liberal	W. Barrow	231	7.8%	▲2.9
Conservative	E. J. Crighton	172	5.8%	▼6.4
Majority		2,334	78.35%	▲44.65%
Registered electors		10,638		
Turnout		2,979	28%	▲6.8
Labour hold		Swing	▲24.5	

=== Liverpool No.9 (Childwall) ===
Liverpool No.9 (Childwall) - 2 seats
Party	Candidate	Votes	%	±%
Conservative	C. Henry De Boer *	3,114	43.8%	▼44.9
Conservative	Mary V .Wood *	3,060	43.0%	▼45.7
Labour	P. Astbury	2,072	29.1%	▲15.6
Labour	A. Mulhearn	2,040	28.7%	▲15.2
Liberal	W. A. Barton	1,928	27.1%	▲10.4
Liberal	E. M. Brash	1,887	26.5	▲11.0
Majority		1,042		▼
Registered electors		19,620		
Turnout		7,114	36.3	▼3.0
Labour gain from Conservative		Swing	▼	
Labour gain from Conservative		Swing	▼	

=== Liverpool No.10 (Church) ===
Liverpool No.10 (Church)
Party	Candidate	Votes	%	±%
Liberal	Leonard Tyrer	3,163	46.6%	▲5.5
Conservative	H.C.Bolton-Jones	2,284	33.6%	▼7.6
Labour	Maria Gee	1,326	19.5%	▼11.8
Majority		879	12.95	▲2.85
Registered electors		14,728		
Turnout		6,790	46.1%	▼1
Liberal gain from Labour		Swing	▲13.1	

=== Liverpool No.11 (Clubmoor) ===
Liverpool No.11 (Clubmoor)
Party	Candidate	Votes	%	±%
Labour	H. Rimmer	2,161	49.4%	▲23.0
Liberal	Audrey Humphries	1,699	38.8%	▲4.0
Conservative	S. Costain	499	11.4%	▼27.4
Majority		462	10.56%	▲6.56
Registered electors		10,694		
Turnout		4,374	40.9%	▲3.4
Labour gain from Conservative		Swing	▲50.4	

=== Liverpool No.12 (County) ===
Liverpool No.12 (County)
Party	Candidate	Votes	%	±%
Labour	Sylvia Renilson	2,230	48.7%	▲20.1
Liberal	R. I. Jobling	1,672	36.5%	▲4.6
Conservative	W. Thomas	668	14.6%	▼24.9
Majority		558	12.19%	▲5.09
Registered electors		12,015		
Turnout		4,578	38.1%	▲
Labour gain from Conservative		Swing	▼45.0	

=== Liverpool No.13 (Croxteth) ===
Liverpool No.13 (Croxteth)
Party	Candidate	Votes	%	±%
Conservative	E.H. Fitzpatrick	2,119	44.5%	▼9.8
Labour	F. Burke	1,577	33.1%	▲20
Liberal	T. R.Jones	1,056	22.2%	▼10.4
Majority		542	11.38	▼9.8
Registered electors		13,370		
Turnout		4,764	35.6%	▼12.6
Conservative hold		Swing	▼9.8	

=== Liverpool No.14 (Dingle) ===
Liverpool No.14 (Dingle)
Party	Candidate	Votes	%	±%
Labour	M. Evans *	1,662	63.9%	▲9.8
Liberal	J. C. Cawley	687	27.1	▲18.1
Conservative	J. A. Watson	168	6.6	▼26.6
Communist	J. Greig	46	2	▼2.2
Majority		935	36.85	▼17.25
Registered electors		7,269		
Turnout		2,537	34.9%	▲10
Labour hold		Swing	▼9.8	

=== Liverpool No.15 (Dovecot) ===
Liverpool No.15 (Dovecot)
Party	Candidate	Votes	%	±%
Labour	J. V. Walsh	3,167	53.2%	▲11.9
Liberal	G.B.Smith	1,850	31.1%	▲18.4
Conservative	J. L. Walsh	896	15.1%	▼27.9
Majority		1,317	22.13%	▲17.43
Registered electors		16,258		
Turnout		5,950	36.6%	▲7.7
Labour gain from Conservative		Swing	▲27.0	

=== Liverpool No.16 (Fairfield) ===
Liverpool No.16 (Fairfield)
Party	Candidate	Votes	%	±%
Liberal	Frank Doran	1,805	55.7%	▲21.5%
Labour	S. J. Gorman	1,056	32.6%	▲6.5
Conservative	Mary Davis	361	11.4%	▼26.6
Majority		749	23.12%	▲19.12
Registered electors		9,771		
Turnout		3,240	33.2%	▲1.1
Liberal gain from Conservative		Swing	▲48.1	

=== Liverpool No.17 (Fazakerley) ===
Liverpool No.17 (Fazakerley)
Party	Candidate	Votes	%	±%
Labour	W. F. Roe	2,347	58.1%	▲28.8
Conservative	A. Brown	943	23.3%	▼20.2
Liberal	Patricia Fairhurst	740	18.3%	▼9.0
Majority		1,404	34.76	▲20.56
Registered electors		11,313		
Turnout		4,039	35.7%	▼3.2
Labour gain from Conservative		Swing	▲49.0	

=== Liverpool No.18 (Gillmoss) ===
Liverpool No.18 (Gillmoss) - 2 seats
Party	Candidate	Votes	%	±%
Labour	A. Jennings	4,409	83.4%	▲23.7
Labour	T. McManus	4,212	79.7%	▼
Liberal	J. Farley	451	8.5%	▲
Conservative	A. Gore	447	8.5%	▼31.8
Liberal	J. G. Morgan	429	8.1%	▲
Conservative	D.G.Dougherty	428	8.1%	▲
Majority		3,958	74.85%	▲25.15
Registered electors		18,439		
Turnout		5,288	28.7	▲3.3
Labour hold		Swing	▲23.7	
Labour hold		Swing		

=== Liverpool No.19 (Granby & Princes Park) ===
Liverpool No.19 (Granby & Princes Park)
Party	Candidate	Votes	%	±%
Labour	Margaret Simey	1,940	58.0%	▲10.2
Liberal	A.Damsell	1,041	31.1%	▲19.6
Conservative	A. Palin	277	8.3%	▼27.3
Communist	S. P. Munby	66	2%	▼3.3
Majority		899	26.88%	▲16.68
Registered electors		11,110		
Turnout		3,344	30.1%	▲6.7
Labour hold		Swing	▲10.2	

=== Liverpool No.20 (Kensington) ===
Liverpool No.20 (Kensington)
Party	Candidate	Votes	%	±%
Liberal	A.H.Thomas	1,236	51.7%	▼6.5
Labour	L.Reynolds	997	41.7%	▲19.4
Conservative	D.Ellis	149	6.2%	▼13.5
Majority		239	10.0%	▼26
Registered electors		6,551		
Turnout		2,391	36.5%	▲1.1
Rejected ballots		9	0.38%	
Liberal hold		Swing	▼6.5	

=== Liverpool No.21 (Low Hill & Smithdown) ===
Liverpool No.21 (Low Hill & Smithdown)
Party	Candidate	Votes	%	±%
Liberal	N. Caple	1,577	49.0%	▼4.9
Labour	A. Gamble	1,523	47.4%	▲15.3
Conservative	A. R. Hopkinsons	108	3.4%	▼9.1
Majority		54	1.69%	▼10.8
Registered electors		8,462		
Turnout		3,216	38.0%	▲4.9
Rejected ballots		8	0.25%	
Liberal hold		Swing	▼4.9	

=== Liverpool No.22 (Melrose & Westminster) ===
Liverpool No.22 (Melrose & Westminster)
Party	Candidate	Votes	%	±%
Labour	B. Shaw *	2,045	59.4%	0%
Liberal	K. A. Sewill	1,237	35.9%	▲25.0
Conservative	S. Fitzsimmons	154	4.5%	▼27.2
Majority		808	23.47%	▼4.23
Registered electors		8,140		
Turnout		3,443	42.3%	▲16.5
Labour hold		Swing	0.0%	

=== Liverpool No.23 (Old Swan) ===
Liverpool No.23 (Old Swan)
Party	Candidate	Votes	%	±%
Labour	Jane A. Hollinshead	2,572	52.6%	▲11.2
Liberal	D. M. Galbraith	1,194	24.4%	▼11.7
Conservative	W. H. Connolly	973	19.9%	▼21.5
Communist	H. Mohin	65	1.3%	▼1.2
Independent Liberal	K. McCullough	61	1.25%	▼0.45
Majority		1,378	28.2%	▲22.9%
Registered electors		12,095		
Turnout		4,886	40.4%	▲2.1
Rejected ballots		21	0.43%	
Labour hold		Swing	▲11.2	

=== Liverpool No.24 (Picton) ===
Liverpool No.24 (Picton)
Party	Candidate	Votes	%	±%
Liberal	P. D. Mahon *	2,668	59.5%	▲16.5
Labour	R. J. Clarke	1,336	29.8%	▲2.8
Conservative	I. G. McKellar	395	8.8%	▼19.2
Communist	J. G. Volleamere	68	1.5%	▼0.5
Majority		1,332	29.71%	
Registered electors		10,856		
Turnout		4,484	41.3%	▲4.0
Rejected ballots		17	0.38%	
Liberal hold		Swing	▲16.5	

=== Liverpool No.25 (Pirrie) ===
Liverpool No.25 (Pirrie)
Party	Candidate	Votes	%	±%
Labour	R. N. Wareing	4,280	75.8%	▲30.0
Conservative	J. M. Wright	788	14.0%	▼33.0%
Liberal	T. G. Ellis	567	10.0%	▲2%
Majority		3,492	61.85%	▼
Registered electors		15,727		
Turnout		5,646	35.9%	▲3.9
Rejected ballots		11	0.19%	
Labour gain from Conservative		Swing	▲63%	

=== Liverpool No.26 (St. Marys) ===
Liverpool No.26 (St. Marys)
Party	Candidate	Votes	%	±%
Labour	H. Keidan	1,721	49.0%	▲10.0%
Liberal	Peter Milea	1,070	30.4%	▲18.4
Conservative	D. R. Hawes	649	18.5%	▼27.5
Communist	R. Ross	57	1.6%	▼1.4
Majority		651	18.53%	
Registered electors		8,741		
Turnout		3,514	40.1%	▲10.1
Rejected ballots		17	0.48%	
Labour gain from Conservative		Swing	▲37.5	

=== Liverpool No.27 (St. Michaels) ===
Liverpool No.27 (St. Michaels)
Party	Candidate	Votes	%	±%
Labour	G. G. Pratt	1,141	36.1%	▲18.1
Liberal	G. Abrams	1,140	36.1%	▼0.9
Conservative	R. S. Jones *	863	27.3%	▼18.7
Majority		1	0.03%	▼
Registered electors		9,576		
Turnout		3,160	33.0%	▼1.0
Rejected ballots		16	0.51%	
Labour gain from Conservative		Swing	▲19	

=== Liverpool No.28 (Sandhills & Vauxhall) ===
Liverpool No.28 (Sandhills & Vauxhall)
Party	Candidate	Votes	%	±%
Labour	J. Hughes	2,569	79.4%	▼0.6
Liberal	S.Radford	192	5.9%	▼1.1
Conservative	Hazel J. Clarke	59	1.8%	▼11.1
Majority		2,377	73.48%	▼6.48
Registered electors		8,381		
Turnout		3,235	38.6%	▲21.6%
Rejected ballots				
Labour hold		Swing	▼0.6	

=== Liverpool No.29 (Speke) ===
Liverpool No.29 (Speke)
Party	Candidate	Votes	%	±%
Labour	B. Simpson	2,934	69.9%	▲13.9
Liberal	J. D. Ball	832	19.8%	▲12.8
Conservative	A. Nugent	430	10.2%	▼26.8
Majority		2,102	50.08%	▲31.08%
Registered electors		13,281		
Turnout		4,197	31.6%	▼10.6
Rejected ballots		1	0.02%	
Labour hold		Swing	▲13.9	

=== Liverpool No.30 (Tuebrook) ===
Liverpool No.30 (Tuebrook)
Party	Candidate	Votes	%	±%
Liberal	B. Gore	1,890	44.3%	▲14.3
Labour	T. McDonald	1,690	39.6%	▼16.6
Conservative	J. Irving	676	15.8%	▼30.2
Majority		200	4.68%	▼
Registered electors		10,570		
Turnout		4,270	40.4%	▲5.4
Liberal gain from Conservative		Swing	▲44.5	

=== Liverpool No.31 (Warbreck) ===
Liverpool No.31 (Warbreck)
Party	Candidate	Votes	%	±%
Labour	R. Riley	1,455	41.6%	▲20.6
Conservative	R. B. Flude *	1,140	32.6%	▼16.4
Liberal	H. G. Rogers	883	25.3%	▼3.7
Majority		315	9.01%	
Registered electors		10,955		
Turnout		3,495	31.9%	▼3.1
Rejected ballots		17	0.49%	
Labour gain from Conservative		Swing	▲37.0	

=== Liverpool No.32 (Woolton East) ===
Liverpool No.32 (Woolton East)
Party	Candidate	Votes	%	±%
Labour	L. Evans *	3,152	77.3%	▲28.3
Liberal	Jean E.Nester	483	11.8%	▲4.8
Conservative	Pamela Stephen	429	10.5%	▼27.5
Majority		2,723	66.81%	▲55.81
Registered electors		11,848		
Turnout		4,076	34.4%	▲6.4
Rejected ballots		12	0.29%	
Labour hold		Swing	▲28.3	

=== Liverpool No.33 (Woolton West) ===
Liverpool No.33 (Woolton West) - 2 seats
Party	Candidate	Votes	%	±%
Conservative	L. B. Williams *	3,681	54.6%	▼21.4
Conservative	T. L. Hobday *	3,679	54.6%	▼21.4
Labour	D. A. Bradbury	1,723	25.6%	▲13.6
Labour	P. R. Martin	1,671	24.8%	▲13.8
Liberal	C. Mayes	1,335	19.8%	▲8.8
Liberal	R. J. Ormsby	1,286	19.1%	▲8.1
Majority		1,958	29.05%	
Registered electors		17,859		
Turnout		6,739	37.7%	▼6.3
Rejected ballots		0	0%	
Conservative hold		Swing	▼21.4	
Conservative hold		Swing	▼21.4	

== Sefton ==
=== Bootle No.1 ===
Bootle No.1 (Derby & Stanley)
Party	Candidate	Votes	%	±%
Labour	A. S. Moore	2,677	68%	▲25
Conservative	F. P. Morris *	788	20%	▼28
Liberal	Mrs. H. Fjortoft	458	12%	▲5
Majority		1,889	48.05%	▲43.05
Registered electors		12,640		
Turnout		3,931	31%	▼
Rejected ballots		8	0.2%	
Labour gain from Conservative		Swing	▲53	

=== Bootle No.2 (Linacre & Mersey) ===
Bootle No.2 (Linacre & Mersey)
Party	Candidate	Votes	%	±%
Labour	W. A. Wiseman *	2,142	77%	▲18
Liberal	R. E. Williams	337	12%	N/A
Conservative	H. E. Dunbar	285	10%	▼2
Majority		1,805	64.88%	
Registered electors		9,432		
Turnout		2,782	29%	▲12
Rejected ballots		18	0.65%	
Labour hold		Swing	▲18	

=== Bootle No.3 (Netherton, Orrell & Sefton) ===
Bootle No.3 (Netherton, Orrell & Sefton) - 2 seats
Party	Candidate	Votes	%	±%
Labour	B. Hillen *	5,255	68%	▲8
Labour	T. J. McNicholas	5,109	66%	▲18
Liberal	A. J. F. Harris	1,336	17%	
Liberal	J. Butterfield	1,291	17%	
Conservative	G. Halliwell	1,117	14%	▼18
Conservative	J. F. Burrows	1,050	14%	▼28
Majority		4,138	53.68	
Registered electors		24,130		
Turnout		7,704	32%	▲5
Rejected ballots				
Labour hold		Swing	▲18	
Labour hold		Swing	▲17	

=== Crosby No.1 (Central, College & St. John's) ===
Crosby No.1 (Central, College & St. John's)
Party	Candidate	Votes	%	±%
Conservative	N. C. Goldrein *	1,931	41%	▼28
Liberal	K. Sartain	1,507	32%	▲15
Labour	J. C. Hulligan	1,293	27%	▲10
Majority		424	8.96%	▼43.04
Registered electors		11,943		
Turnout		4,731	40%	▲4
Rejected ballots				
Conservative hold		Swing	▼28	

=== Crosby No.2 (Christ Church, St. Mary's & St. Thomas) ===
Crosby No.2 (Christ Church, St. Mary's & St. Thomas)
Party	Candidate	Votes	%	±%
Labour	R. D. Waring	2,325	57%	▲19
Conservative	R. O. Harvey *	1,013	25%	▼31
Liberal	V. B. Kehoe	754	18%	▲12
Majority		1,312	13.91%	
Registered electors		10,278		
Turnout		4,111	40%	▲7
Rejected ballots		19	0.46%	
Labour gain from Conservative		Swing	▲50	

=== Crosby No.3 ===
Crosby No.3
Party	Candidate	Votes	%	±%
Conservative	W. R. Bennett *	2,074	54%	▼18
Labour	E. A. Murphy	1,771	46%	▲26
Majority		303	7.85%	
Registered electors		10,323		
Turnout		3,861	37%	
Rejected ballots		16	0.41%	
Conservative hold		Swing	▼18	

=== Crosby No.4 ===
Crosby No.4
Party	Candidate	Votes	%	±%
Conservative	F. L. Pritchard *	2,581	69%	▼13
Labour	G. Stringer	654	17%	▲10
Liberal	C. E. Bolger	521	14%	▲3
Majority		1,927	51.20%	▼
Registered electors		9,203		
Turnout		3,764	41%	▼5
Rejected ballots		8	0.21%	
Conservative hold		Swing	▼13	

=== Formby ===
Formby
Party	Candidate	Votes	%	±%
Conservative	J. R. Murray-Bligh	3,629	49%	▼32%
Liberal	Margaret Metcalfe	2,142	29%	▲10
Labour	J. L. Linden	1,206	16%	
Green	R. W. Small	474	6.4%	
Majority		1,487	19.94%	
Registered electors		18,599		
Turnout		7,458	40%	▼3
Rejected ballots		7	0.09%	
Conservative hold		Swing	▼32	

=== Litherland ===
Litherland
Party	Candidate	Votes	%	±%
Labour	E. Lawrenson	4,133	73%	▲29
Conservative	Mrs. G. Buckles	1,472	26%	▼22
Majority		2,661	47.29%	▼
Registered electors		16,077		
Turnout		5,627	35%	▲1
Rejected ballots		22	0.39%	
Labour gain from Conservative		Swing	▲51	

=== Southport No.1 (Ainsdale, Birkdale & South) ===
Southport No.1 (Ainsdale, Birkdale & South)
Party	Candidate	Votes	%	±%
Conservative	J. Hartley *	2,606	56%	▼31
Liberal	R. W. Rothwell	1,266	27.2%	▲1.2
Labour	J. F. Caven	777	17%	▲7
Majority		1,340	28.79%	▼32.21
Registered electors		14,192		
Turnout		4,655	33%	
Rejected ballots		6	0.13%	
Conservative hold		Swing	▼31	

=== Southport No.2 ===
Southport No.2
Party	Candidate	Votes	%	±%
Liberal	R. Rimmer	1,759	40%	▲14
Conservative	B. Lamont	1,548	35%	▼24
Labour	S. Forkins	1,101	25%	▲10
Majority		211	4.79%	
Registered electors		12,174		
Turnout		4,408	36%	▲3
Rejected ballots				
Liberal gain from Conservative		Swing	▲38	

=== Southport No.3 (Birkdale West-Central-West) ===
Southport No.3 (Birkdale West-Central-West)
Party	Candidate	Votes	%	±%
Liberal	S. Shaw	1,681	50.0%	▲28
Conservative	J. Morland	1,675	49.8%	▼28.2
Majority		6	0.18%	▼
Registered electors		9,120		
Turnout		3,365	37%	▲3
Rejected ballots		9	0.27%	
Liberal hold		Swing	▲56.2	

=== Southport No.4 (Craven-Sussex-Talbot) ===
Southport No.4 (Craven-Sussex-Talbot)
Party	Candidate	Votes	%	±%
Liberal	Ronald Fearn *	3,213	76%	▲26
Conservative	J. Heaton	997	24%	▼16
Majority		2,216	52.4%	
Registered electors		11,188		
Turnout		4,229	38%	▲4
Rejected ballots		19	0.45%	
Liberal hold		Swing	▲26	

=== Southport No.5 (Hesketh & Scarisbrick) ===
Southport No.5 (Hesketh & Scarisbrick)
Party	Candidate	Votes	%	±%
Liberal	D. Griffiths	2,611	48%	▲13
Conservative	Mrs. J. Leech *	2,134	40%	▼16
Labour	A. Bell	643	12%	▲3
Majority		477	8.85%	
Registered electors		11,516		
Turnout		5,389	47%	▼3
Rejected ballots		1	0.02%	
Liberal gain from Conservative		Swing	▲29	

=== Southport No.6 (Marine and Park) ===
Southport No.6 (Marine and Park)
Party	Candidate	Votes	%	±%
Conservative	J. Robinson	1,831	47%	▼20
Liberal	N. Jones	1,673	42%	▲9
Labour	R. Burnett	428	11%	
Majority		158	4.01%	▼
Registered electors		11,378		
Turnout		3,937	35%	▼4
Rejected ballots		5	0.13%	
Conservative hold		Swing	▼20	

=== West Lancashire No.1 (Aintree) ===
West Lancashire No.1 (Aintree)
Party	Candidate	Votes	%	±%
Conservative	A. I. Birch *	2,251	64%	▼19
Labour	C. Toner	1,259	36%	▲19
Majority		992	28.09%	▼
Registered electors		9,674		
Turnout		3,531	36%	▲1
Rejected ballots		21	0.59&	
Conservative hold		Swing	▼19	

=== West Lancashire No.2 ===
West Lancashire No.2
Party	Candidate	Votes	%	±%
Conservative	C. Currall *	2,069	44%	▼32
Labour	E. Kay	1,533	33%	▲10
Resident	C. Jones	1,100	23.4%	
Majority		536	11.39%	▼42.21
Registered electors		14,482		
Turnout		4,707	33%	▼2
Rejected ballots		5	0.11%	
Conservative hold		Swing	▼32	

=== West Lancashire No.3 ===
West Lancashire No.3
Party	Candidate	Votes	%	±%
Conservative	N. Bernard	1,109	31%	N/A
Liberal	J. Parkin	932	26%	N/A
Labour	S. Peacock	873	25%	N/A
Resident	P. Matthews	628	17.7%	N/A
Majority		177	4.98%	N/A
Registered electors		10,205		
Turnout		3,551	35%	N/A
Rejected ballots		9	0.25%	N/A
Conservative hold		Swing	N/A	

== St. Helens ==
=== Haydock ===
Haydock
Party	Candidate	Votes	%	±%
Labour	D. Craig	3,759	76%	▲31
Conservative	P. Anderton *	1,191	24%	▼31
Majority		2,568	51.81%	▲
Registered electors		12,120		
Turnout		4,957	41%	▼8
Rejected ballots		7	0.14%	
Labour gain from Conservative		Swing	▲55	

=== Newton Le Willows ===
Newton Le Willows
Party	Candidate	Votes	%	±%
Labour	J. Duncan	3,521	47%	▲2
Liberal	E. Sherlock	3,161	42%	▲28
Conservative	M. Finlayson	835	11%	▼30
Majority		360	4.81%	▲
Registered electors		14,949		
Turnout		7,517	50%	▲9
Rejected ballots				
Labour hold		Swing	▲2	

=== Rainford ===
Rainford
Party	Candidate	Votes	%	±%
Conservative	Mrs. A. Berry *	2,856	42%	▼36
Labour	R. Ledwith	2,843	42%	▲20
Liberal	I. Grieg	1,100	16%	N/A
Majority		13	0.19%	▼
Registered electors		15,964		
Turnout		6,817	43%	▼5
Rejected ballots		13	0.19%	
Conservative hold		Swing	▼36	

=== St. Helens No.1 (Central and South Eccleston) ===
St. Helens No.1 (Central and South Eccleston)
Party	Candidate	Votes	%	±%
Labour	H.Glover	2,083	66%	▲27
Conservative	Mrs. E. Jameson *	767	24%	▼30
Liberal	P. Fitzmaurice	299	9%	▲2
Majority		1,316	41.71%	▲26.51%
Registered electors		9,334		
Turnout		3,155	34%	▲1
Rejected ballots		6	0.19%	
Labour gain from Conservative		Swing	▲57	

=== St. Helens No.2 (East Sutton) ===
St. Helens No.2 (East Sutton)
Party	Candidate	Votes	%	±%
Labour	J. Thompson	2,561	72%	▲29
Liberal	W. Iley	532	14%	▲4
Conservative	A. Taylor	301	8%	▼39
Independent	I. Finney	104	5%	N/A
Majority		2,119	57.43%	▼
Registered electors		12,857		
Turnout		3,690	29%	▲9
Rejected ballots		22	0.60%	
Labour gain from Conservative		Swing	▲68	

=== St. Helens No.3 (Hardshaw and West Sutton) ===
St. Helens No.3 (Hardshaw and West Sutton)
Party	Candidate	Votes	%	±%
Labour	T. Talbot	3,631	73%	▲33
Liberal	T. Gilligan	989	20%	▲1
Conservative	R. Jones	345	7%	▼30
Majority		2,642	52.91%	▲
Registered electors		16,479		
Turnout		4,993	30%	
Rejected ballots		28	0.56%	
Labour hold		Swing	▲33	

=== St. Helens No.4 (Moss Bank and North Windle) ===
St. Helens No.4 (Moss Bank and North Windle)
Party	Candidate	Votes	%	±%
Labour	T. Gadsden	2,547	55%	▲22
Conservative	E. Jameson *	1,602	35%	▼28
Liberal	P. Pennington	467	10%	▲6
Majority		945	20.43%	▼
Registered electors		12,993		
Turnout		4,626	36%	▼4
Rejected ballots		10	0.22%	
Labour gain from Conservative		Swing	▲50	

=== St. Helens No.5 (North Eccleston and South Windle) ===
St. Helens No.5 (North Eccleston and South Windle)
Party	Candidate	Votes	%	±%
Labour	J. Duncan	1,589	69%	▲33
Conservative	W. Carter	717	31%	▼33
Majority		877	37.77%	
Registered electors		6,694		
Turnout		2,309	34%	▲3
Rejected ballots		3	0.13%	
Labour gain from Conservative		Swing	▲	

=== St. Helens No.6 (Parr) ===
St. Helens No.6 (Parr)
Party	Candidate	Votes	%	±%
Labour	G. Leyland	2,672	75%	▲20%
Conservative	M.Powell	500	14%	▼25
Liberal	P. Dennington	396	11%	▲5
Majority		2,172	60.87%	▲45.17
Registered electors		16,507		
Turnout		3,568	22%	▼3
Rejected ballots				
Labour hold		Swing	▲20	

=== Whiston No.2 (Eccleston and Windle) ===
Whiston No.2 (Eccleston and Windle)
Party	Candidate	Votes	%	±%
Conservative	G. Brownlow	2,530	70%	▼18
Labour	K. Bamforth	1,052	29%	▲17
Majority		1,478	41.04%	▼34.96
Registered electors		10,260		
Turnout		3,601	35%	▼13
Rejected ballots		19	0.53%	
Conservative hold		Swing	▼18	

=== Whiston No. 5 (Rainhill and Bold) ===
Whiston No. 5 (Rainhill and Bold)
Party	Candidate	Votes	%	±%
Labour	B. McCormick	1,843	41%	▲9%
Conservative	Mrs. Nellie Holley	1,528	34%	▼34
Liberal	P. Thomas	1,117	25%	N/A
Majority		315	7%	▼
Registered electors		11,255		
Turnout		4,502	40%	▲14
Rejected ballots		14	0.31%	
Labour gain from Conservative		Swing	▲43	

== Wirral ==
=== Bebington No.1 (Higher Bebington and Woodhey) ===
Bebington No.1 (Higher Bebington and Woodhey)
Party	Candidate	Votes	%	±%
Conservative	I. Richmond	2,466	53%	▼27
Labour	P. Holt	1,380	30%	N/A
Liberal	P. Golby	803	17%	▼3
Majority		1,086	23.28%	
Registered electors		9,942		
Turnout		4,663	47%	▲1
Rejected ballots		14	0.30%	
Conservative hold		Swing	▼27	

=== Bebington No.2 (Park, New Ferry, North Bromborough) ===
Bebington No.2 (Park, New Ferry, North Bromborough)
Party	Candidate	Votes	%	±%
Labour	A. Rose	2,512	58%	▲17
Conservative	E. A. Davies	1,320	28%	▼23
Liberal	D. Cottrell	623	14%	▲6
Majority		1,302	29.96%	▲
Registered electors		9,572		
Turnout		4,346	45%	
Rejected ballots		1	0.02%	
Labour gain from Conservative		Swing	▲40	

=== Wirral Bebington No.3 (South Bromborough and Eastham) ===
Wirral Bebington No.3 (South Bromborough and Eastham)
Party	Candidate	Votes	%	±%
Liberal	P. N. Gilchrist *	3,714	51%	▲6
Labour	E. Williams	2,170	30%	▲10
Conservative	M. Evans	1,423	19%	▼17
Majority		1,544	21.09%	▲12.21
Registered electors		13,866		
Turnout		7,321	53%	▲4
Rejected ballots		14	0.19%	
Liberal hold		Swing	▼	

=== Bebington No. 4 (Lower Bebington & Poulton) ===
Bebington No. 4 (Lower Bebington & Poulton)
Party	Candidate	Votes	%	±%
Conservative	F. J. K. Williams *	3,479	54%	▼24
Labour	J. Durrant	1,666	26%	N/A
Liberal	M. Cody	1,329	20%	▼2
Majority		1,813	27.95%	▼27.25
Registered electors		14,511		
Turnout		6,486	45%	▼4
Rejected ballots		12	0.19%	
Conservative hold		Swing	▼24	

=== Birkenhead No.1 (Argyle-Clifton-Holt) ===
Birkenhead No.1 (Argyle-Clifton-Holt)
Party	Candidate	Votes	%	±%
Labour	J. Stuart-Cole	1,831	72%	▲22
Liberal	E.Rise	404	16%	
Conservative	F. Dawson	295	12%	▼16
Majority		1,427	56.34%	▲35.34
Registered electors		7,016		
Turnout		2,533	36%	▲7%
Rejected ballots		3	0.12%	
Labour hold		Swing	▲22	

=== Birkenhead No.2 (Bebington and Mersey) ===
Birkenhead No.2 (Bebington and Mersey)
Party	Candidate	Votes	%	±%
Labour	P. Liddell	1,944	68%	▲24
Conservative	H. Welsh *	590	21%	▼28
Liberal	A. Brighouse	299	11%	▲4
Majority		1,354	47.71%	
Registered electors		8,220		
Turnout		3,535	43%	▲10
Rejected ballots		11	0.31%	
Labour gain from Conservative		Swing	▲52	

=== Birkenhead No. 3 (Cathcart-Claughton-Cleveland) ===
Birkenhead No. 3 (Cathcart-Claughton-Cleveland)
Party	Candidate	Votes	%	±%
Liberal	D. Boxer	1,535	43%	▼12
Labour	N. Holbrook	1,288	36%	▲33
Conservative	D. Esseen	701	20%	▼22
Majority		834	23.59%	
Registered electors		8,220		
Turnout		3,535	43%	▲10
Rejected ballots		11	0.31%	
Liberal hold		Swing	▼12	

=== Birkenhead No.4 (Devonshire and Egerton) ===
Birkenhead No.4 (Devonshire and Egerton)
Party	Candidate	Votes	%	±%
Labour	V. Ruck	2,347	50%	▲26
Conservative	W. R. Baker *	1,269	27%	▼17
Liberal	P. Lloyd	1,082	23%	▼9
Majority		1,078	22.95%	
Registered electors		11,742		
Turnout		4,698	40%	Steady
Rejected ballots				
Labour gain from Conservative		Swing		

=== Birkenhead No. 5 (Bidston) ===
Birkenhead No. 5 (Bidston)
Party	Candidate	Votes	%	±%
Labour	J. McCabe	2,034	63%	▲5
Liberal	R. Wood	932	29%	▲9
Conservative	R. Owen	263	8%	▼14
Majority		1,771	54.73%	▲18
Registered electors		8,450		
Turnout		3,236	38%	▲6
Rejected ballots		7	0.22%	
Labour hold		Swing	▲5	

=== Birkenhead No.6 (Oxton) ===
Birkenhead No.6 (Oxton)
Party	Candidate	Votes	%	±%
Liberal	A. Brame	2,542	46%	▲7
Conservative	F. J. Morton *	1,553	28%	▼17
Labour	A. Chape	1,258	23%	▲11
Green	J. Bell	111	2%	
Majority		989	18.07%	▲11.6
Registered electors		12,820		
Turnout		5,474	43%	▼5
Rejected ballots		10	0.18%	
Liberal gain from Conservative		Swing	▼	

=== Birkenhead No. 7 (Prenton) ===
Birkenhead No. 7 (Prenton)
Party	Candidate	Votes	%	±%
Labour	W. Gamet	3,556	55%	▲29
Conservative	A. E. Wise *	2,827	44%	▼21
Majority		729	11.37%	▼27.63
Registered electors		15,087		
Turnout		6,412	43%	▲8
Rejected ballots		29	0.45%	
Labour gain from Conservative		Swing		

=== Birkenhead No.8 (Upton) ===
Birkenhead No.8 (Upton)
Party	Candidate	Votes	%	±%
Labour	D. Kean	4,565	56%	▲24
Conservative	I. Allison	1,975	24%	▼37
Liberal	E. Copestake	1,558	19%	▲12
Majority		2,590	31.97%	▼2.97
Registered electors		21,431		
Turnout		8,101	38%	▲5
Rejected ballots		3	0.04%	
Labour gain from Conservative		Swing	▼	

=== Hoylake No.1 (Royden) ===
Hoylake No.1 (Royden)
Party	Candidate	Votes	%	±%
Conservative	R. Stretch	3,205	62%	▼20
Liberal	N. Blackwood	1,127	22%	▲17
Labour	I. Travis	793	15%	▲6
Majority		2,078	40.5%	▼32.1
Registered electors		14,173		
Turnout		5,131	36%	▼7
Rejected ballots		6	0.12%	
Conservative hold		Swing	▼20	

=== Hoylake No.2 (Hoylake) ===
Hoylake No.2 (Hoylake)
Party	Candidate	Votes	%	±%
Conservative	J. W. Last *	2,754	58%	▼20
Liberal	P. Barker	1,392	30%	▲15
Labour	J. Robb	556	12%	▲5
Majority		1,362	28.87%	▼32.63
Registered electors		12,127		
Turnout		4,717	39%	▼10
Rejected ballots		15	0.32%	
Conservative hold		Swing	▼20	

=== Wallasey No.1 (Leasowe)) ===
Wallasey No.1 (Leasowe))
Party	Candidate	Votes	%	±%
Labour	J. George	2,611	64%	▲20
Conservative	A. Downie	821	20%	▼27
Liberal	B. Thomas	656	16%	▲10
Majority		1,790	43.79%	▲40.13
Registered electors		11,915		
Turnout		4,088	34%	▼2
Rejected ballots				
Labour gain from Conservative		Swing		

=== Wallasey No.2 (Liscard) ===
Wallasey No.2 (Liscard)
Party	Candidate	Votes	%	±%
Labour	D. Mason	2,154	45%	▲18
Conservative	K. Young	1,713	35%	▼28
Liberal	M. Canning	827	17%	▲7
British Democratic Party (1979)	R. Eccleston	132	3%	N/A
Majority		441	9.12%	▼27.33
Registered electors		12,692		
Turnout		4,836	38%	▼2.16
Rejected ballots		10	0.21%	▼0.13
Labour gain from Conservative		Swing		

=== Wallasey No.3 (Moreton) ===
Wallasey No.3 (Moreton)
Party	Candidate	Votes	%	±%
Labour	R. Patterson	1,564	50%	▲21
Conservative	D. Williams	1,035	33%	▼33
Liberal	J. C. Jenkins	506	16%	▲11
Majority		529	17.02%	▼19.12
Registered electors		8,180		
Turnout		3,108	38%	▼4
Rejected ballots		3	0.10%	
Labour gain from Conservative		Swing		

==== Wallasey No.4 (Wallasey) ====
Wallasey No.4 (Wallasey)
Party	Candidate	Votes	%	±%
Conservative	M. F. Emberton *	3,687	61%	▼8
Liberal	I. Horton	1,299	21%	▼5
Labour	V. McGee	1,085	18%	▲14
Majority		2,388	39.24%	▼4.01
Registered electors		14,217		
Turnout		6,085	43%	▼10
Rejected ballots		14	0.23%	
Conservative hold		Swing	▼8	

=== Wallasey No.5 (New Brighton) ===
Wallasey No.5 (New Brighton)
Party	Candidate	Votes	%	±%
Conservative	K. W. Porter *	1,883	49%	▼27
Labour	J. Fairbrother	1,118	29%	▲14
Liberal	J. Canning	689	18%	▲9
British Democratic Party (1979)	R. Lloyd-Parry	132	3%	N/A
Majority		765	20%	▼41.56
Registered electors		11.316		
Turnout		3,825	34%	▼3
Rejected ballots		3	0.08%	
Conservative hold		Swing	▼27	

=== Wallasey No.6 (Seacombe) ===
Wallasey No.6 (Seacombe)
Party	Candidate	Votes	%	±%
Labour	J. Gershman *	2,200	71%	▲25
Conservative	A. Adams	590	19%	▼25
Liberal	D. Bentley	300	10%	▲2
Majority		1,610	52%	▼47.98
Registered electors		10,638		
Turnout		3,096	29%	▼5
Rejected ballots		6	0.19%	
Labour hold		Swing	▲25	

=== Wirral No.1 (Heswall) ===
Wirral No.1 (Heswall)
Party	Candidate	Votes	%	±%
Conservative	J. C. Smyth *	3,696	83%	▼5
Labour	R. Harris	724	16%	▲7
Majority		2,972	66.92%	▼14.82
Registered electors		11,594		
Turnout		4,441	38%	▼8
Rejected ballots		21	0.47%	
Conservative hold		Swing	▼5	

=== Wirral No.2 (Irby, Pensby & Thurstaston) ===
Wirral No.2 (Thurstaston))
Party	Candidate	Votes	%	±%
Conservative	M. Lavender	1,928	51%	▼25
Liberal	A. Conway	941	25%	▲16
Labour	A. Rea	886	24%	▲9
Majority		1,042	27.71%	▼33.92
Registered electors		10,189		
Turnout		3,760	37%	▼9
Rejected ballots		5	0.13%	
Conservative hold		Swing	▼25	
