= Westminster (Liverpool ward) =

Former ward of Liverpool City Council (UK)

- Westminster ward within Liverpool
- Registered Electors: 5,779 (1972 election)
- Metropolitan borough: City of Liverpool
- Metropolitan county: Merseyside
- Region: North West
- Country: England
- Sovereign state: United Kingdom
- UK Parliament: Liverpool Kirkdale

Westminster ward was an electoral division of Liverpool City Council between 1953 and 1972. It sat between the Walton, Liverpool, Everton and Kirkdale districts of Liverpool, England.

== Background ==
The ward was formed in 1953 and was merged with Melrose ward to form Melrose, Westminster ward in 1973. It elected three councillors to the Council.

=== 1953 boundaries ===
The ward was part of the Liverpool Kirkdale Parliamentary constituency.

=== 1973 election ===
Following the Local Government Act 1972 the ward boundaries of the council were altered. The number of wards was reduced from 40 to 33 and the aldermanic system was abolished. Westminster ward was merged with Melrose ward to form Melrose, Westminster ward.

== Councillors ==
| Election | Councillor | Councillor | Councillor |
|---|---|---|---|
| 1953 | R.J. Alcock (Lab) | F. Murphy (Lab) | John Hamilton (Lab) |
| 1954 | R.J. Alcock (Lab) | F. Murphy (Lab) | John Hamilton (Lab) |
| 1955 | R.J. Alcock (Lab) | Eddie Burke (Lab) | Reginald McLaughlin (Con)^{[a]} |
| 1956 | R.J. Alcock (Lab) | Eddie Burke (Lab) | Harold Lee (Lab) |
| 1957 | R.J. Alcock (Lab) | Eddie Burke (Lab) | Harold Lee (Lab) |
| 1958 | R.J. Alcock (Lab) | Eddie Burke (Lab) | Harold Lee (Lab) |
| 1959 | R.J. Alcock (Lab) | Eddie Burke (Lab) | Harold Lee (Lab) |
| 1960 | James Gillin (Con) | Eddie Burke (Lab) | Harold Lee (Lab) |
| 1961 | James Gillin (Con) | Eddie Burke (Lab) | Harold Lee (Lab) |
| 1962 | James Gillin (Con) | Eddie Burke (Lab) | H. Carr (Lab) |
| 1963 | J. Dunn (Lab) | Eddie Burke (Lab) | H. Carr (Lab) |
| 1964 | J. Dunn (Lab) | Eddie Burke (Lab) | H. Carr (Lab) |
| 1965 | J. Dunn (Lab) | Eddie Burke (Lab) | William Gilbody (Con) |
| 1966 | James Gardner (Lab) | Eddie Burke (Lab) | William Gilbody (Con) |
| 1967 | James Gardner (Lab) | James Gillin (Con) | William Gilbody (Con) |
| 1968 | James Gardner (Lab) | James Gillin (Con) | William Gilbody (Con) |
| 1969 | James Wareing (Con) | James Gillin (Con) | William Gilbody (Con) |
| 1970 | James Wareing (Con) | James Gillin (Con) | William Gilbody (Con) |
| 1971 | James Wareing (Con) | James Gillin (Con) | William Lafferty (Lab) |
| 1972 | James Gardner (Lab) | James Gillin (Con) | William Lafferty (Lab) |

indicates seat up for re-election after boundary changes.

indicates seat up for re-election.

indicates change in affiliation.

indicates seat up for re-election after casual vacancy.

=== Notes ===
a. Cllr John Hamilton (Labour, 1953) was elected as an Alderman on 23 May 1955 and vacated his seat as a Councillor.

== Election results ==
=== Elections of the 1950s ===
Thursday 7 May 1959
| Party | Candidate | Votes | % | ±% |
|---|---|---|---|---|
| **Labour** | **H. Lee** | **1,693** | **54.97** | **▼12.39** |
| Conservative | J. Gillin | 1,387 | 45.03 | ▲12.39 |
| Majority | | 306 | 9.94 | ▼24.77 |
| Turnout | | 3,080 | 38.01 | ▲2.82 |
| Registered electors | | 8,104 | | |
| Labour **hold** | | Swing | -12.39 | |

Thursday 9 May 1958
| Party | Candidate | Votes | % | ±% |
|---|---|---|---|---|
| **Labour** | **E. Burke** | **1,921** | **67.36** | **▲7.09** |
| Conservative | R.M. Jones | 931 | 32.64 | ▼7.09 |
| Majority | | 990 | 34.71 | ▲14.17 |
| Turnout | | 2,852 | 35.19 | ▼1.32 |
| Registered electors | | 8,104 | | |
| Labour **hold** | | Swing | +7.09 | |

Thursday 9 May 1957
| Party | Candidate | Votes | % | ±% |
|---|---|---|---|---|
| **Labour** | **R.J. Alcock** | **1,840** | **60.27** | **▲2.65** |
| Conservative | R.M. Jones | 1,213 | 39.73 | ▼2.65 |
| Majority | | 627 | 20.54 | ▲5.29 |
| Turnout | | 3,053 | 36.51 | ▼2.90 |
| Registered electors | | 8,363 | | |
| Labour **hold** | | Swing | +2.65 | |

Thursday 10 May 1956
| Party | Candidate | Votes | % | ±% |
|---|---|---|---|---|
| **Labour** | **H. Lee** | **1,950** | **57.62** | **▲9.23** |
| Conservative | R.J. McLau | 1,434 | 42.38 | ▼9.23 |
| Majority | | 516 | 15.25 | ▲12.03 |
| Turnout | | 3,384 | 39.41 | ▲3.59 |
| Registered electors | | 8,586 | | |
| Labour **gain** from Conservative | | Swing | +9.23 | |

Westminster Ward By-election, 1955
| Party | Candidate | Votes | % | ±% |
|---|---|---|---|---|
| **Conservative** | **Reginald John McLaughlin** | **1,601** | **51.61** | **▲5.07** |
| Labour | Harold Lee | 1,501 | 48.39 | ▼5.07 |
| Majority | | 100 | 3.22 | ▼3.69 |
| Turnout | | 3,102 | 35.82 | ▼13.45 |
| Registered electors | | 8,661 | | |
| Conservative **gain** from Labour | | Swing | 5.07 | |

Thursday 12 May 1955
| Party | Candidate | Votes | % | ±% |
|---|---|---|---|---|
| **Labour** | **Eddie Burke** | **2,281** | **53.46** | **▼6.32** |
| Conservative | E. Shaw | 1,986 | 46.54 | ▲6.32 |
| Majority | | 295 | 6.91 | ▼12.65 |
| Turnout | | 4,267 | 49.27 | ▲2.96 |
| Registered electors | | 8,661 | | |
| Labour **hold** | | Swing | -6.32 | |

Thursday 13 May 1954
| Party | Candidate | Votes | % | ±% |
|---|---|---|---|---|
| **Labour** | **R.J. Alcock** | **2,399** | **59.78** | **▲6.37** |
| Conservative | E. Shaw | 1,614 | 40.22 | ▼6.37 |
| Majority | | 785 | 19.56 | ▲12.73 |
| Turnout | | 4,013 | 46.31 | ▼2.96 |
| Registered electors | | 8,665 | | |
| Labour **hold** | | Swing | +6.37 | |

Thursday 7 May 1953
| Party | Candidate | Votes | % | ±% |
|---|---|---|---|---|
| **Labour** | **John Hamilton** | **2,300** | **53.41** | |
| **Labour** | **F. Murphy** | **2,296** | **53.32** | |
| **Labour** | **R.J. Alcock** | **2,219** | **51.53** | |
| Conservative | E. Shaw | 2,006 | 46.59 | |
| Conservative | S.E. Goldsmith | 1,867 | 43.36 | |
| Conservative | A.G. Cleather | 1,865 | 43.31 | |
| Majority | | 294 | 6.83 | |
| Turnout | | 4,306 | 49.27 | |
| Registered electors | | 8,739 | | |
| Labour **win** (new seat) | | | | |
| Labour **win** (new seat) | | | | |
| Labour **win** (new seat) | | | | |

=== Notes ===
• italics - Denotes the sitting Councillor.
•bold - Denotes the winning candidate.

== See also ==
- Liverpool City Council
- Liverpool City Council elections 1880–present
- Liverpool Town Council elections 1835 - 1879
