= New Westminster (disambiguation) =

New Westminster is a city in British Columbia, Canada.

New Westminster may also refer to:

- New Westminster Land District, in British Columbia, Canada
- New Westminster Secondary School, in New Westminster, British Columbia, Canada
- New Westminster station, in New Westminster, British Columbia, Canada

== See also ==
- Diocese of New Westminster (disambiguation)
- New Westminster Bruins, a Canadian junior ice hockey team
- New Westminster Royals (disambiguation)
- New Westminster Salmonbellies, a lacrosse team
- Queen of New Westminster, a ferry
