= 1956 Liverpool City Council election =

1956 UK local election

← 1955	10 May 1956	1957 →
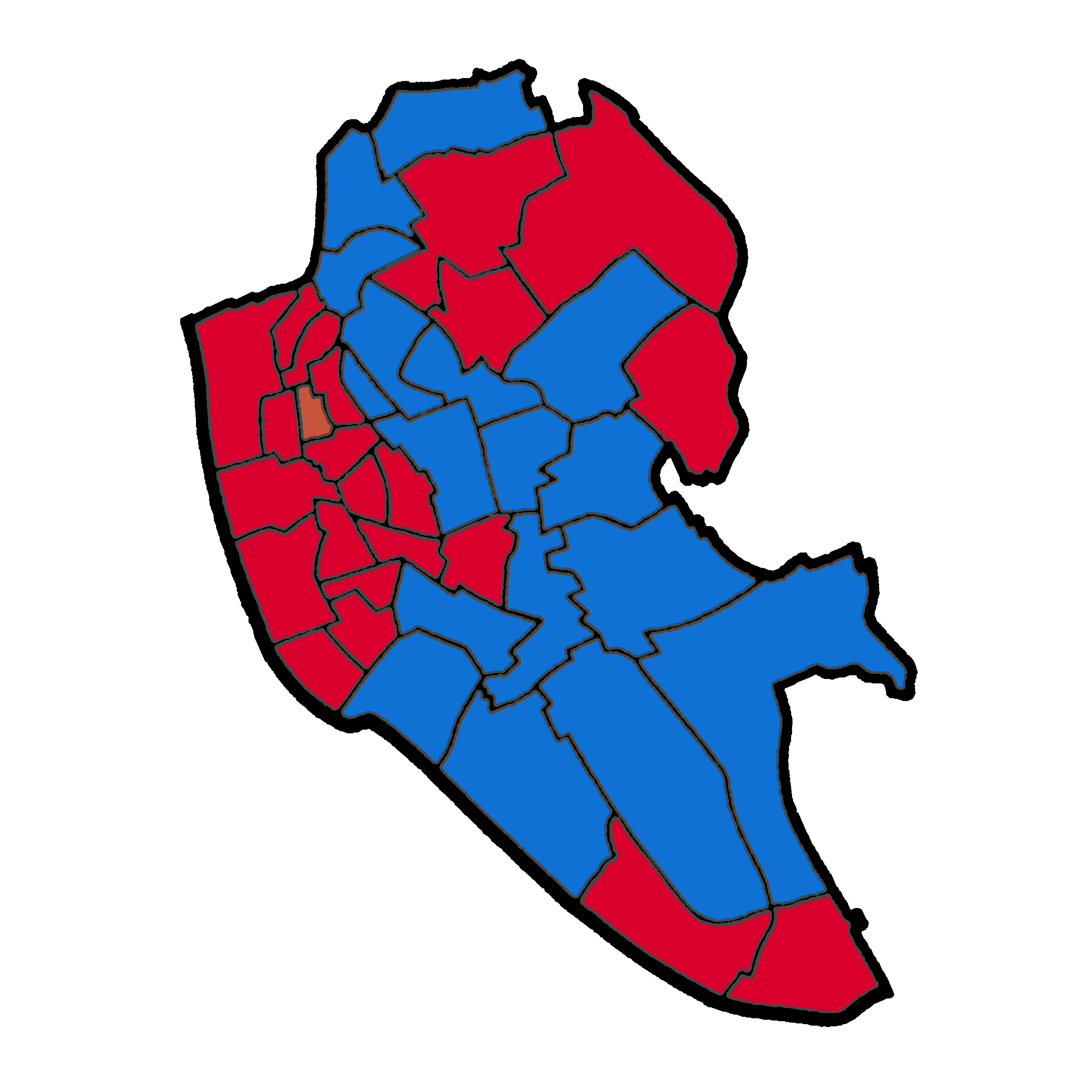
- Map of Liverpool showing wards won (first placed party)

Elections to Liverpool City Council were held on Thursday, 10 May 1956.

After the election, the composition of the council was:

Party	Councillors	±	Aldermen	Total
Labour	65	+6	28	93
Conservative	52	-6	11	63
Protestant	2	0	1	3
Independent Labour Party	1	0	0	1

== Election result ==
Liverpool local election result 1956
Party	Seats	Gains	Losses	Net gain/loss	Seats %	Votes %	Votes	+/−
Labour	23	6	0	+6	56%	49%	89,627	
Conservative	17	0	6	-6	41%	48%	86,388	
Protestant	1	0	0	0	2.4%	0.84%	1,522	
Liberal	0	0	0	0	0%	0.39%	707	
Communist	0	0	0	0	0%	0.29%	527	
Independent	0	0	0	0	0%	0.20%	366	

== Ward results ==
* - Councillor seeking re-election

^{(PARTY)} - Party of former Councillor

The Councillors seeking re-election at this election were elected in 1953 for a three-year term, therefore comparisons are made with the 1953 election results.

=== Abercromby ===
Abercromby
Party	Candidate	Votes	%	±%
Labour	P Orr ^{(PARTY)}	2,023	54%	
Conservative	J. H. W. Stewart	1,501	40%	
Communist	A. M^{c}Clelland	206	6%	
Majority		522		
Registered electors		11,864		
Turnout		3,730	31%	
Labour hold		Swing		

=== Aigburth ===
Aigburth
Party	Candidate	Votes	%	±%
Conservative	H. M. Allen *	4,700	91%	
Labour	Mrs. D. L. H. Taylor	450	9%	
Majority		4.250		
Registered electors		14,088		
Turnout		5,150	37%	
Conservative hold		Swing		

=== Allerton ===
Allerton
Party	Candidate	Votes	%	±%
Conservative	C. Haswell *	2,706	81%	
Labour	H. Deane	628	19%	
Majority		2,078		
Registered electors		10,216		
Turnout		3,334	33%	
Conservative hold		Swing		

=== Anfield ===
Anfield
Party	Candidate	Votes	%	±%
Conservative	R. F. Craine *	3,809	61%	
Labour	R. Stoddart	2,434	39%	
Majority		1,375		
Registered electors		15,113		
Turnout		6,243	41%	
Conservative hold		Swing		

=== Arundel ===
Arundel
Party	Candidate	Votes	%	±%
Conservative	W. I. Throssell *	2,358	56%	
Labour	F. D. Shemmonds	1,745	41%	
Communist	J. Kay	128	3%	
Majority		613		
Registered electors		12,993		
Turnout		4,231	33%	
Conservative hold		Swing		

=== Breckfield ===
Breckfield
Party	Candidate	Votes	%	±%
Conservative	S. Airey ^{(PARTY)}	2,187	52%	
Labour	Mrs. M. G. Wheeler	2,059	48%	
Majority		128		
Registered electors		12,110		
Turnout		4,246	35%	
Conservative hold		Swing		

=== Broadgreen ===
Broadgreen
Party	Candidate	Votes	%	±%
Conservative	L. H. Sanders *	2,845	64%	
Labour	E. Moonman	1,570	36%	
Majority		1,275		
Registered electors		12,279		
Turnout		4,415	36%	
Conservative hold		Swing		

=== Central ===
Central
Party	Candidate	Votes	%	±%
Labour	J. Cullen *	1,888	65%	
Conservative	J. P. Moyses	1,020	35%	
Majority		868		
Registered electors		10,065		
Turnout		2,908	29%	
Labour hold		Swing		

=== Childwall ===
Childwall
Party	Candidate	Votes	%	±%
Conservative	W. J. Sergent *	3,356	87%	
Labour	Mrs. L. Wooding	497	13%	
Majority		2,859		
Registered electors		14,060		
Turnout		3,853	27%	
Conservative hold		Swing		

=== Church ===
Church
Party	Candidate	Votes	%	±%
Conservative	Mrs. A. E. Papworth ^{(PARTY)}	3,888	77%	
Liberal	Mrs. A. E. Shanks	707	14%	
Labour	W. J. Wolger	442	9%	
Majority		3,181		
Registered electors		14,427		
Turnout		5,037	35%	
Conservative hold		Swing		

=== Clubmoor ===
Clubmoor
Party	Candidate	Votes	%	±%
Labour	J. Cassin	2,475	50.3%	
Conservative	L. J. Carr *	2,444	49.7%	
Majority		31		
Registered electors		12,277		
Turnout		4,919	40%	
Labour gain from Conservative		Swing		

=== County ===
County
Party	Candidate	Votes	%	±%
Conservative	Mrs. M. E. Jones *	3,720	53%	
Labour	H. James	3,327	47%	
Majority		393		
Registered electors		14,959		
Turnout		7,047		
Conservative hold		Swing		

=== Croxteth ===
Croxteth
Party	Candidate	Votes	%	±%
Conservative	F. Bidston ^{(PARTY)}	3,691	72%	
Labour	J. H. Goodenough	1,415	28%	
Majority		2,276		
Registered electors		11,654		
Turnout		5,106	44%	
Conservative hold		Swing		

=== Dingle ===
Dingle
Party	Candidate	Votes	%	±%
Labour	W. F. Aldis *	3,365	59%	
Conservative	R. F. Grace	2,220	39%	
Communist	W. H. Hart	137	2%	
Majority		1,145		
Registered electors		14,420		
Turnout		5,722	40%	
Labour hold		Swing		

=== Dovecot ===
Dovecot
Party	Candidate	Votes	%	±%
Labour	W. P. Johnson *	3,088	62%	
Conservative	P. Tickle	1,925	38%	
Majority		1,163		
Registered electors		14,946		
Turnout		5,013	34%	
Labour hold		Swing		

=== Everton ===
Everton
Party	Candidate	Votes	%	±%
Labour	W. Smyth ^{(PARTY)}	2,377	76%	
Conservative	J. Jordan	756	24%	
Majority		1,621		
Registered electors		12,366		
Turnout		3,133	25%	
Labour hold		Swing		

=== Fairfield ===
Fairfield
Party	Candidate	Votes	%	±%
Conservative	R. Meadows *	2,814	60%	
Labour	J. Wood	1,850	40%	
Majority		964		
Registered electors		14,931		
Turnout		4,664	31%	
Conservative hold		Swing		

=== Fazakerley ===
Fazakerley
Party	Candidate	Votes	%	±%
Conservative	K. P. Thompson *	3,492	55%	
Labour	F. Grue	2,911	45%	
Majority		581		
Registered electors		12,542		
Turnout		6,403	51%	
Conservative hold		Swing		

=== Gillmoss ===
Gillmoss
Party	Candidate	Votes	%	±%
Labour	C. McDonald *	4,204	73%	
Conservative	H. R. Butler	1,550	27%	
Majority		2,654		
Registered electors		16,719		
Turnout		5,754	34%	
Labour hold		Swing		

=== Granby ===
Granby
Party	Candidate	Votes	%	±%
Labour	W. Tipping ^{(PARTY)}	2,192	56%	
Conservative	J. Moore	1,734	44%	
Majority		458		
Registered electors		12,176		
Turnout		3,926	32%	
Labour hold		Swing		

=== Kensington ===
Kensington
Party	Candidate	Votes	%	±%
Labour	F. Walker *	2,772	61%	
Conservative	C. G. S. Gordon	1,789	39%	
Majority		983		
Registered electors		13,409		
Turnout		4,561	34%	
Labour hold		Swing		

=== Low Hill ===
Low Hill
Party	Candidate	Votes	%	±%
Labour	W. R. Snell ^{(PARTY)}	2,147	64%	
Conservative	J. E. Billing	1,231	36%	
Majority		916		
Registered electors		11,074		
Turnout		3,378	31%	
Labour hold		Swing		

=== Melrose ===
Melrose
Party	Candidate	Votes	%	±%
Labour	T. A. Seagroves ^{(PARTY)}	2,240	66%	
Conservative	J. Smith	1,151	34%	
Majority		1,089		
Registered electors		10,478		
Turnout		3,391	32%	
Labour hold		Swing		

=== Netherfield ===
Netherfield
Party	Candidate	Votes	%	±%
Protestant	J. Dorman *	1,522	52%	
Labour	G. Carmichael	1,422	48%	
Majority		100		
Registered electors		9,433		
Turnout		2,944	31%	
Protestant hold		Swing		

=== Old Swan ===
Old Swan
Party	Candidate	Votes	%	±%
Conservative	A. N. Bates *	3,698	56%	
Labour	G. P. Watson	2,758	42%	
Majority		940		
Registered electors		16,124		
Turnout		6,577	41%	
Conservative hold		Swing		

=== Picton ===
Picton - 2 seats
Party	Candidate	Votes	%	±%
Labour	H. Evans ^{(PARTY)}	3,082	53%	
Labour	A. G. Roberts ^{(PARTY)}	2,979	51%	
Conservative	John Ernest Lockwood	2,770	47%	
Conservative	G. P. Brewer	2,765	47%	
Majority		312		
Registered electors		15,060		
Turnout		5,852	39%	
Labour hold		Swing		
Labour hold		Swing		

=== Pirrie ===
Pirrie
Party	Candidate	Votes	%	±%
Labour	H. Dalton *	4,773	64%	
Conservative	B. A. Ryan	2,739	36%	
Majority		2,034		
Registered electors		17,691		
Turnout		7,512	42%	
Labour hold		Swing		

=== Prince's Park ===
Prince's Park
Party	Candidate	Votes	%	±%
Labour	J. Sidwell *	2,541	57%	
Conservative	Mrs. J. Lever	1,907	43%	
Majority		634		
Registered electors		14,061		
Turnout		4,448	32%	
Labour hold		Swing		

=== Sandhills ===
Sandhills
Party	Candidate	Votes	%	±%
Labour	H. Rowlands ^{(PARTY)}	2,746	92%	
Independent	A. P. Cooney	223	8%	
Majority		2,746		
Registered electors		9,863		
Turnout		2,969	30%	
Labour hold		Swing		

=== St. Domingo ===
St. Domingo
Party	Candidate	Votes	%	±%
Labour	F. Keating *	2,671	58%	
Protestant	Mrs. M. J. Longbottom	1,937	42%	
Majority		2,671		
Registered electors		12,527		
Turnout		4,608	37%	
Labour hold		Swing		

=== St. James ===
St. James
Party	Candidate	Votes	%	±%
Labour	A. F. Skinner ^{(PARTY)}	2,185	75%	
Conservative	J. F. Jones	736	25%	
Majority		1,449		
Registered electors		11,445		
Turnout		2,921	26%	
Labour hold		Swing		

=== St. Mary's ===
St. Mary's
Party	Candidate	Votes	%	±%
Labour	H. Crowley ^{(PARTY)}	2,939	70%	
Conservative	J. F. Barnes	1,258	30%	
Majority		1,681		
Registered electors		11,986		
Turnout		4,197	35%	
Labour hold		Swing		

=== St. Michael's ===
St. Michael's
Party	Candidate	Votes	%	±%
Conservative	A. B. Collins *	2,944	75%	
Labour	Mrs. E. E. Wright	1,003	25%	
Majority		1,941		
Registered electors		10,398		
Turnout		3,947	38%	
Conservative hold		Swing		

=== Smithdown ===
Smithdown
Party	Candidate	Votes	%	±%
Labour	L. Holden *	2,573	70%	
Conservative	R. M. Jones	1,115	30%	
Majority		1,458		
Registered electors		13,573		
Turnout		3,688	27%	
Labour hold		Swing		

=== Speke ===
Speke
Party	Candidate	Votes	%	±%
Labour	T. Higgins ^{(PARTY)}	2,935	72%	
Conservative	C. Dickinson	1,157	28%	
Majority		1,778		
Registered electors		14,051		
Turnout		4,092	29%	
Labour hold		Swing		

=== Tuebrook ===
Tuebrook
Party	Candidate	Votes	%	±%
Conservative	J. F. Bradley *	2,937	57%	
Labour	R. J. Luke	2,255	43%	
Majority		682		
Registered electors		13,495		
Turnout		5,192	38%	
Conservative hold		Swing		

=== Vauxhall ===
Vauxhall
Party	Candidate	Votes	%	±%
Labour	A. Dunford ^{(PARTY)}	2,430	85%	
Independent	C. McBride	366	13%	
Communist	R. Cuerdon	72	3%	
Majority		2,430		
Registered electors		10,405		
Turnout		2,868	28%	
Labour hold		Swing		

=== Warbreck ===
Warbreck
Party	Candidate	Votes	%	±%
Conservative	F. Woolfenden *	3,661	62%	
Labour	R. Crawshaw	2,273	38%	
Majority		1,388		
Registered electors		13,997		
Turnout		5.934	42%	
Conservative hold		Swing		

=== Westminster ===
Westminster
Party	Candidate	Votes	%	±%
Labour	H. Lee ^{(PARTY)}	1,950	58%	
Conservative	R. J. McLau	1,434	42%	
Majority		516		
Registered electors		8,586		
Turnout		3,384	39%	
Labour hold		Swing		

=== Woolton ===
Woolton
Party	Candidate	Votes	%	±%
Conservative	G. F. Caitlin *	3,145	76%	
Labour	Mrs. P. H. Henley	992	24%	
Majority		2,153		
Registered electors		12,525		
Turnout		4,137	33%	
Conservative hold		Swing		
