= Westminster School (disambiguation) =

Westminster School is an independent school in Westminster, London, England.

Westminster School may also refer to:

== Australia ==
- Westminster School, Adelaide

== United States ==
- Westminster School (Connecticut), in Simsbury
- Westminster School (Oklahoma), in Oklahoma City
- Westminster School (Annandale, Virginia)
- Westminster Schools of Augusta, Georgia
- The Westminster Schools, in Atlanta, Georgia
- Westminster School District, Orange County, California

== See also ==
- Westminster (disambiguation)
- Westminster Academy (disambiguation)
- Westminster Christian School (disambiguation)
- Westminster College (disambiguation)
- Westminster High School (disambiguation)
- Westminster University (disambiguation)
- Westminster Abbey Choir School, in London, England
- Westminster City School, in London, England
- Westminster Under School, in London, England
- Westminster School of Art, a former art school in London, England
