= Westminster College =

Westminster College may refer to:

== United Kingdom ==
- City of Westminster College, London, England
- Westminster College (Cambridge), England
- Westminster College, Oxford, England
- Westminster College of Chemistry and Pharmacy, in London, England, 1874–1942
- Westminster Kingsway College, London, England

== United States ==
- Westminster Choir College, in Princeton, New Jersey, U.S.
- Westminster College (Utah), U.S.
- Westminster College (Missouri), Fulton, Missouri, U.S.
- Westminster College (Pennsylvania), U.S.
- Westminster College (Texas), U.S.
- Wesley College (Mississippi), U.S., formerly Westminster College

== See also ==
- Westminster (disambiguation)
- Westminster Academy (disambiguation)
- Westminster High School (disambiguation)
- Westminster School (disambiguation)
- Westminster University (disambiguation)
- Westminster Kingsway College, London, England
