= Statute of Westminster Adoption Act =

There are two Acts named Statute of Westminster Adoption Act:

- Statute of Westminster Adoption Act 1942, an Act of the Parliament of Australia
- Statute of Westminster Adoption Act 1947, a constitutional Act of the Parliament of New Zealand

== See also ==
- Statute of Westminster (disambiguation)
