= Westminster Academy =

Westminster Academy may refer to:

- Westminster Academy (Florida), US
- Westminster Academy, London, London, UK
- Westminster Academy (Tennessee), US
- Westminster Christian Academy (Georgia), US
- Westminster Christian Academy (Louisiana), US
- Westminster Christian Academy (Missouri), US
- Westminster Christian Academy (New Jersey), US, which acquired Southern Cape Christian School in 2026

== See also ==
- Westminster (disambiguation)
- Westminster College (disambiguation)
- Westminster High School (disambiguation)
- Westminster School (disambiguation)
