= Westminster High School =

Westminster High School may refer to:

== Philippines ==
- Westminster High School (Manila)

== United States ==
- Westminster High School (California)
- Westminster High School (Colorado)
- Westminster High School (Maryland)
- The Westminster Schools, Atlanta, Georgia

== See also ==
- Westminster Academy (disambiguation)
- Westminster College (disambiguation)
- Westminster School (disambiguation)
- Westminster University (disambiguation)
