= 1955 Liverpool City Council election =

1955 UK local election

← 1954	12 May 1955	1956 →
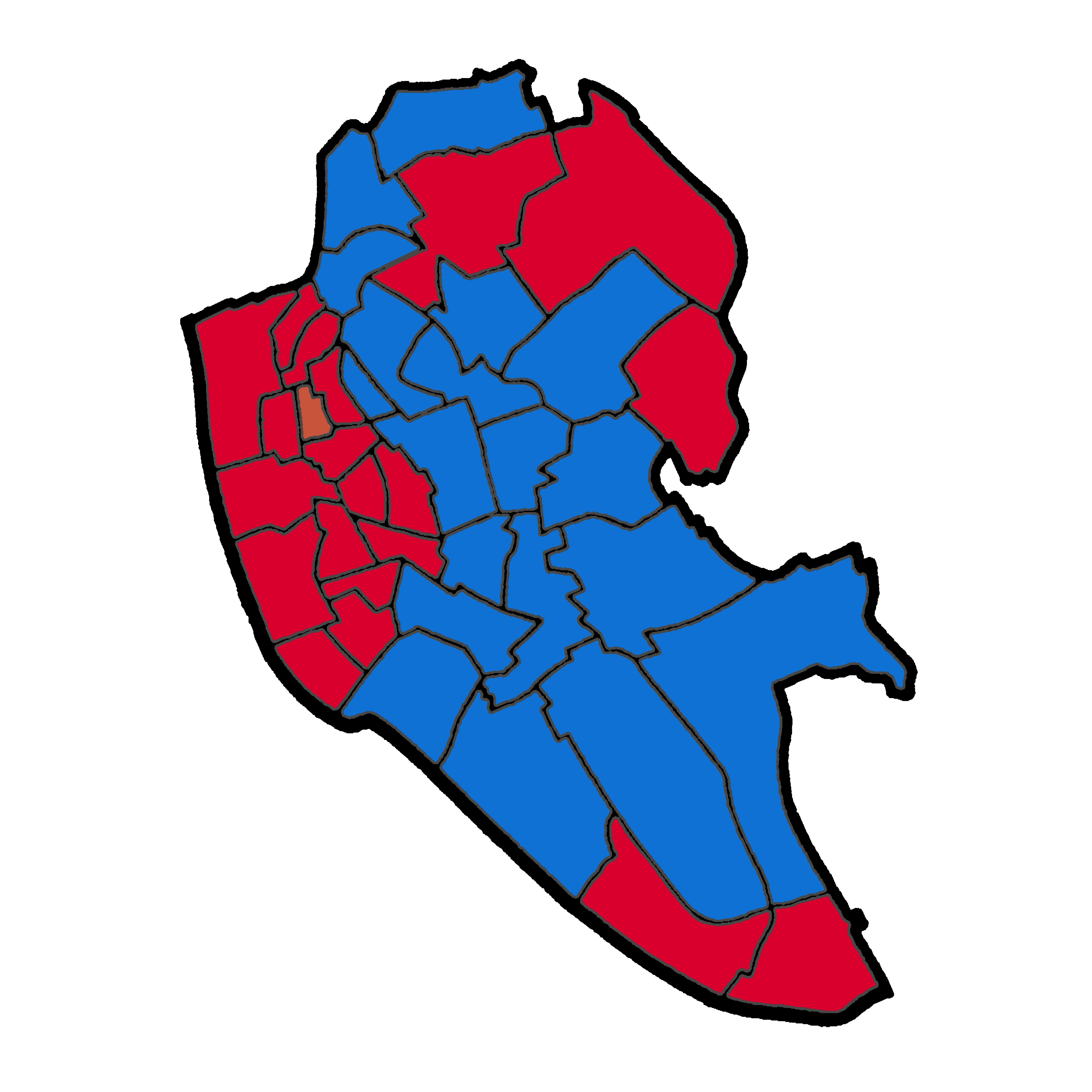
- Map of Liverpool showing wards won (first placed party)

Elections to Liverpool City Council were held on Thursday 12 May 1955. After the election, the composition of the council was:

Party	Councillors	±	Aldermen	Total
Conservative	53	+1	27	80
Labour	65	-1	9	74
Protestant	2	0	1	3
Independent	1	0	1	2
Liberal	0	0	1	1

== Election result ==
Liverpool local election result 1955
Party	Seats	Gains	Losses	Net gain/loss	Seats %	Votes %	Votes	+/−
Conservative								
Labour								
Liberal								
Protestant								
Communist								

== Ward results ==
* - Councillor seeking re-election

^{(PARTY)} - Party of former Councillor

The Councillors seeking re-election at this election were elected in the 'all-up' election in 1953 for a two-year term (as they were the candidates receiving the second highest number of votes). Therefore, comparisons are made with the 1953 election results.

=== Abercromby ===
Abercromby
Party	Candidate	Votes	%	±%
Labour	P. McGuire ^{(PARTY)}	2,330	51%	
Conservative	J. H. W. Stewart	1,979	43%	
Communist	A. M^{c}Clelland	264	6%	
Majority		351		
Registered electors		12,241		
Turnout		4,573	37%	
Labour hold		Swing		

=== Aigburth ===
Aigburth
Party	Candidate	Votes	%	±%
Conservative	W. A. Kinnear *	3,615	88%	
Labour	T. Higgins	509	12%	
Majority		3,106		
Registered electors		14,033		
Turnout		4,124	29&	
Conservative hold		Swing		

=== Allerton ===
Allerton
Party	Candidate	Votes	%	±%
Conservative	S. Minion ^{(PARTY)}	3,477	81%	
Labour	H. Knowles	810	19%	
Majority		2,667		
Registered electors		10,208		
Turnout		4,287		
Conservative hold		Swing		

=== Anfield ===
Anfield
Party	Candidate	Votes	%	±%
Conservative	J. A. Porter ^{(PARTY)}	4,566	66%	
Labour	W. K. Fox	2,373	34%	
Majority		2,193		
Registered electors		15,362		
Turnout		6,939	45%	
Conservative hold		Swing		

=== Arundel ===
Arundel
Party	Candidate	Votes	%	±%
Conservative	H. Lees *	3,660	72%	
Labour	J. Palliser	1,436	28%	
Majority		2,224		
Registered electors		13,376		
Turnout		5,096	38%	
Conservative hold		Swing		

=== Breckfield ===
Breckfield
Party	Candidate	Votes	%	±%
Conservative	S. E. Goldsmith ^{(PARTY)}	3,052	55%	
Labour	W. R. Snell	2,454	45%	
Majority		598		
Registered electors		12,375		
Turnout		5,506	44%	
Conservative hold		Swing		

=== Broadgreen ===
Broadgreen
Party	Candidate	Votes	%	±%
Conservative	L. T. Rogers *	3,669	68%	
Labour	Mrs. L. Wooding	1,695	32%	
Majority		1,974		
Registered electors		12,515		
Turnout		5,364	43%	
Conservative hold		Swing		

=== Central ===
Central
Party	Candidate	Votes	%	±%
Labour	E. M. Mannheim ^{(PARTY)}	2,310	53%	
Independent	J. G, Granby	2,060	47%	
Majority		250		
Registered electors		10,443		
Turnout		4,370	42%	
Labour hold		Swing		

=== Childwall ===
Childwall
Party	Candidate	Votes	%	±%
Conservative	A. Young ^{(PARTY)}	4,094	89%	
Labour	T. McNerney	517	11%	
Majority		3,577		
Registered electors		14,046		
Turnout		4,611	33%	
Conservative hold		Swing		

=== Church ===
Church
Party	Candidate	Votes	%	±%
Conservative	E. Jennings *	5,434	83%	
Labour	Mrs. P. B. Henley	1,136	17%	
Majority		4,299		
Registered electors		14,552		
Turnout		6,569	45%	
Conservative hold		Swing		

=== Clubmoor ===
Clubmoor
Party	Candidate	Votes	%	±%
Conservative	N. A. Williams *	3,248	59%	
Labour	J. Murphy	2,299	41%	
Majority		949		
Registered electors		12,489		
Turnout		5,547	44%	
Conservative hold		Swing		

=== County ===
County
Party	Candidate	Votes	%	±%
Conservative	G. F, Allanson ^{(PARTY)}	4,285	52%	
Labour	R. Stoddart	3,889	48%	
Majority		396		
Registered electors		15,249		
Turnout		8,174	54%	
Conservative hold		Swing		

=== Croxteth ===
Croxteth
Party	Candidate	Votes	%	±%
Conservative	T. H. Thompson *	4,478	85%	
Labour	R. J. Luke	781	15%	
Majority		3,697		
Registered electors		10,666		
Turnout		5,259	49%	
Conservative hold		Swing		

=== Dingle ===
Dingle
Party	Candidate	Votes	%	±%
Labour	F. H. Cain *	3,632	52%	
Conservative	J. F. Bamber	3,119	45%	
Communist	W. H. Hart	205	3%	
Majority		513		
Registered electors		14,627		
Turnout		6,956	48%	
Conservative hold		Swing		

=== Dovecot ===
Dovecot
Party	Candidate	Votes	%	±%
Labour	T. H. Maloney *	3,221	53%	
Conservative	L. F. Hogan	2,894	47%	
Majority		327		
Registered electors		15,024		
Turnout		6,115	41%	
Labour hold		Swing		

=== Everton ===
Everton - 2 seats
Party	Candidate	Votes	%	±%
Labour	J. L. Hughes *	2,996	68%	
Labour	W. Smyth ^{(PARTY)}	2,708	61%	
Conservative	W. Martin	1,424	32%	
Conservative	E. D. Minshull	1,356	31%	
Majority		1,572		
Registered electors		12,925		
Turnout		4,420	34%	
Labour hold		Swing		
Labour hold		Swing		

=== Fairfield ===
Fairfield
Party	Candidate	Votes	%	±%
Conservative	J. S. Ross ^{(PARTY)}	3,636	64%	
Labour	Mrs. M. G. Wheeler	2,029	36%	
Majority		1,607		
Registered electors		15,181		
Turnout		5,665	37%	
Conservative hold		Swing		

=== Fazakerley ===
Fazakerley
Party	Candidate	Votes	%	±%
Conservative	R. Poole *	3,912	59%	
Labour	Andrew Young	2,767	41%	
Majority		1,145		
Registered electors		12,790		
Turnout		6,679	52%	
Conservative hold		Swing		

=== Gillmoss ===
Gillmoss
Party	Candidate	Votes	%	±%
Labour	J. Troy *	3,826	62%	
Conservative	C. P. Conway	2,320	38%	
Majority		1,506		
Registered electors		15,958		
Turnout		6,146	39%	
Labour hold		Swing		

=== Granby ===
Granby
Party	Candidate	Votes	%	±%
Labour	W. T. Brodie *	2,580	52%	
Conservative	A. S. Snowden	2,386	48%	
Majority		194		
Registered electors		12,343		
Turnout		4,966	40%	
Labour hold		Swing		

=== Kensington ===
Kensington
Party	Candidate	Votes	%	±%
Labour	Mrs. E. M. Wormald *	3,064	53%	
Conservative	G. D. Brewer	2,713	47%	
Majority		351		
Registered electors		13,448		
Turnout		5,777	43%	
Labour hold		Swing		

=== Low Hill ===
Low Hill
Party	Candidate	Votes	%	±%
Labour	Mrs. M. J. Powell *	2,998	58%	
Conservative	J. P. Moyses	2,153	42%	
Majority		845		
Registered electors		11,360		
Turnout		5,151	45%	
Labour hold		Swing		

=== Melrose ===
Melrose
Party	Candidate	Votes	%	±%
Labour	A. MacDonald ^{(PARTY)}	2,631	64%	
Conservative	J. Smith	1,478	36%	
Majority		1,153		
Registered electors		10,707		
Turnout		4,109	38%	
Labour hold		Swing		

=== Netherfield ===
Netherfield
Party	Candidate	Votes	%	±%
Protestant	G. E. Lewis *	1,879	50.1%	
Labour	H. G. Trainor	1,874	49.9%	
Majority		5		
Registered electors		9,811		
Turnout		3,753	38%	
Protestant hold		Swing		

=== Old Swan ===
Old Swan
Party	Candidate	Votes	%	±%
Conservative	B. M. Frazer *	4,093	54%	
Labour	V. Burke	3,450	46%	
Majority		643		
Registered electors		16,438		
Turnout		7,543	46%	
Conservative hold		Swing		

=== Picton ===
Picton
Party	Candidate	Votes	%	±%
Conservative	J. E. Kendrick	3,454	51%	
Labour	Francis Burke *	3,310	49%	
Majority		144		
Registered electors		15,139		
Turnout		6,764	45%	
Conservative gain from Labour		Swing		

=== Pirrie ===
Pirrie
Party	Candidate	Votes	%	±%
Labour	J. Morgan *	4,300	53%	
Conservative	B. A. Ryan	3,873	47%	
Majority		427		
Registered electors		17,632		
Turnout		8,173	46%	
Labour hold		Swing		

=== Prince's Park ===
Prince's Park
Party	Candidate	Votes	%	±%
Labour	T. C. Greenwood *	3,442	55%	
Conservative	Ald. C. G. S. Gordon	2,768	45%	
Majority		674		
Registered electors		14,279		
Turnout		6,210	43%	
Labour hold		Swing		

=== Sandhills ===
Sandhills
Party	Candidate	Votes	%	±%
Labour	S. Parr *	2,918	88%	
Conservative	W. H. Beavan	387	12%	
Majority		2,531		
Registered electors		9,888		
Turnout		3,305	33%	
Labour hold		Swing		

=== St. Domingo ===
St. Domingo
Party	Candidate	Votes	%	±%
Labour	J. Gardner *	2,963	52%	
Protestant	Ald. Rev. H. D. Longbottom	2,730	48%	
Majority		233		
Registered electors		12,877		
Turnout		5,693	44%	
Labour hold		Swing		

=== St. James ===
St. James
Party	Candidate	Votes	%	±%
Labour	Mrs. E. E. Gough *	2,716	69%	
Conservative	C. McKeon	1,195	31%	
Majority		1,521		
Registered electors		11,684		
Turnout		3,911	33%	
Labour hold		Swing		

=== St. Mary's ===
St. Mary's
Party	Candidate	Votes	%	±%
Labour	S. R. Maddox *	3,199	52%	
Conservative	C. P. Clingan	2,915	48%	
Majority		284		
Registered electors		12,155		
Turnout		6,114	50%	
Labour hold		Swing		

=== St. Michael's ===
St. Michael's
Party	Candidate	Votes	%	±%
Conservative	C. Cowlin ^{(PARTY)}	3,630	77%	
Labour	Mrs. E. E. Wright	1,101	23%	
Majority		2,529		
Registered electors		10,550		
Turnout		4,731	45%	
Conservative hold		Swing		

=== Smithdown ===
Smithdown
Party	Candidate	Votes	%	±%
Labour	G. W. Clarke ^{(PARTY)}	2,888	62%	
Conservative	J. Moore	1,747	38%	
Majority		1,141		
Registered electors		13,713		
Turnout		4,635	34%	
Labour hold		Swing		

=== Speke ===
Speke
Party	Candidate	Votes	%	±%
Labour	B. Crookes *	3,294	63%	
Conservative	C. Dickinson	1,907	37%	
Majority		1,387		
Registered electors		13,851		
Turnout		5,201	38%	
Labour hold		Swing		

=== Tuebrook ===
Tuebrook
Party	Candidate	Votes	%	±%
Conservative	J. E. Molyneux *	3,927	60%	
Labour	H. Lee	2,564	40%	
Majority		1,363		
Registered electors		13,838		
Turnout		6,491	47%	
Conservative hold		Swing		

=== Vauxhall ===
Vauxhall
Party	Candidate	Votes	%	±%
Labour	D. Cowley *	3,112	88%	
Independent	C. McBride	366	10%	
Communist	R. Cuerdon	76	2%	
Majority		2,746		
Registered electors		10,960		
Turnout		3,554	32%	
Labour hold		Swing		

=== Warbreck ===
Warbreck
Party	Candidate	Votes	%	±%
Conservative	A. W, Lowe *	4,456	67%	
Labour	A. T. Williams	2,170	33%	
Majority		2,286		
Registered electors		14,095		
Turnout		6,626	47%	
Conservative hold		Swing		

=== Westminster ===
Westminster
Party	Candidate	Votes	%	±%
Labour	Eddie Burke	2,281	53%	
Conservative	F. Shaw	1,986	47%	
Majority		295		
Registered electors		8,661		
Turnout		4,267	49%	
Labour gain from Conservative		Swing		

=== Woolton ===
Woolton
Party	Candidate	Votes	%	±%
Conservative	J. Norton	4,250	77%	
Labour	Charles Patrick Wall	1,234	23%	
Majority		3,016		
Registered electors		12,160		
Turnout		5,484	45%	
Conservative hold		Swing		

== Aldermanic elections ==
At the meeting of the City Council on 23 May 1955 the terms of office of twenty of the forty Aldermen expired and the Councillors elected twenty Aldermen to fill the vacant positions for a term of six years. Fifteen Conservative, one Independent, and two Liberal Aldermen were replaced by eighteen Labour Aldermen, allowing Labour to take control of the council for the first time.

Party	Alderman
Labour	Henry Aldritt
Labour	E. M. Braddock
Labour	Joseph Cyril Brady
Labour	Frank Hampton Cain
Labour	Abraham Louis Caplan
Labour	Hugh Carr
Labour	John Hamilton
Labour	Alexander Hardman
Labour	John Leslie Hughes
Labour	William George Ingham
Labour	Lawrence King
Labour	Harry Livermore
Labour	Peter McKernan
Labour	Charles James Minton
Labour	Joseph Morgan
Labour	David Nickson
Labour	Stanley Part
Labour	Fred Robinson
Labour	John Mathew Taylor
Labour	Elizabeth Trainor

== By-elections ==
=== Low Hill ===
By-election caused by the election of John Mathew Taylor (elected Cllr. for Low Hill in 1954) as Alderman.

Low Hill
Party	Candidate	Votes	%	±%
Labour	George Matthew Scott	1,976	56%	
Conservative	John Peter Moyses	1,571	44%	
Majority		405		
Registered electors		11,360		
Turnout		3,547	31%	
Labour hold		Swing		

=== Abercromby ===
By-election caused by the election of Harry Livermore (elected Cllr. for Abercromby in 1953) as Alderman.

Abercromby
Party	Candidate	Votes	%	±%
Conservative	John Herbert Wray Stewart	1,593	49%	
Labour	Miss Mary Seddon	1,537	47%	
Communist	A. McClelland	125	3.8%	
Majority		56		
Registered electors		12,241		
Turnout		3,255	27%	
Conservative gain from Labour		Swing		

=== Central ===
By-election caused by the election of Bessie Braddock as Alderman.

Central
Party	Candidate	Votes	%	±%
Labour	John Cullen	1,899	54%	
Conservative	Vivian Forsyth Crosthwaite	1,633	46%	
Majority		266		
Registered electors		10,443		
Turnout		3,532	34%	
Labour hold		Swing		

=== Granby ===
By-election caused by the election of Elizabeth Trainor (elected as Cllr. for Granby in 1953) as Alderman.

Granby
Party	Candidate	Votes	%	±%
Conservative	Arthur Sydney Sowden	1,797	48%	
Labour	William Tipping	1,675	45%	
Liberal	Edward Kelly	252	6.8%	
Majority		122		
Registered electors		12,343		
Turnout		3,724	30%	
Conservative gain from Labour		Swing		

=== St. James ===
By-election caused by the election of Hugh Carr (elected as Cllr. for St. James in 1953) and William George Ingham (elected as Cllr. for St. James in 1954) as Aldermen.

St. James - 2 seats
Party	Candidate	Votes	%	±%
Labour	Thomas McManus	2,000	69%	
Labour	Alan Frank Skinner	1,746	60%	
	John Fortune Jones	904	31%	
Majority		1,096		
Registered electors		11,684		
Turnout		2,904	25%	
Labour hold		Swing		
Labour hold		Swing		

=== Speke ===
By-election caused by the election of Alexander Hardman (elected as Cllr. for Speke in 1953) as Alderman.

Speke
Party	Candidate	Votes	%	±%
Labour	Thomas Higgins	1,797	57%	
Conservative	Clarence Dickinson	1,094	35%	
Liberal	Miss June Stananought Pritchard	252	8%	
Majority		703		
Registered electors		13,851		
Turnout		3,143	23%	
Labour hold		Swing		

- Pritchard had contested Kirkdale as a Liberal in the 1950 General Election

=== Westminster ===
By-election caused by the election of John Hamilton (elected as Cllr. for Westminster in 1953) as Alderman.

Westminster
Party	Candidate	Votes	%	±%
Conservative	Reginald John McLaughlin	1,601	52%	
Labour	Harold Lee	1,501	48%	
Majority		100		
Registered electors		8,661		
Turnout		3,102	36%	
Conservative gain from Labour		Swing		

=== Everton ===
By-election caused by the election of John Leslie Hughes (elected as Cllr. for Everton in 1953) and David Nickson (elected as Cllr. for Everton in 1954) as Aldermen.

Everton - 2 seats
Party	Candidate	Votes	%	±%
Labour	Francis Burke	1,914	69%	
Labour	Alexander Coveney McLeod	1,853	67%	
Conservative	William Martin	869	31%	
Majority		1,045		
Registered electors		12,925		
Turnout		2,783	22%	
Labour hold		Swing		
Labour hold		Swing		

=== Sandhills ===
By-election caused by the election of Peter McKernan (elected as Cllr. for Sandhills in 1953), Henry Aldritt (elected as Cllr. for Sandhills in 1954) and Stanley Part (elected as Cllr. for Sandhills in 1955) as Aldermen.

Sandhills - 3 seats
Party	Candidate	Votes	%	±%
Labour	Walter Harold Alldritt	1,428	88%	
Labour	John Scully	1,336	83%	
Labour	Hugh Rowlands	1,333	82%	
	Alfred Midwood Proffit	189		
Majority		1,239		
Registered electors		9,888		
Turnout		1,617	16%	
Labour hold		Swing		
Labour hold		Swing		
Labour hold		Swing		

=== Vauxhall ===
By-election caused by the election of Joseph Cyril Brady (elected as Cllr. for Vauxhall in 1954) as Alderman.

Vauxhall
Party	Candidate	Votes	%	±%
Labour	William Dean-Jones	1,543	73%	
Independent	Charles McBride	522	25%	
Communist	Richard Cuerdon	62	2.9%	
Majority		1,021		
Registered electors		10,960		
Turnout		2,127	19%	
Labour hold		Swing		

=== Dingle ===
By-election caused by the election of Frank Hampton Cain (elected as Cllr. for Dingle in 1955) as Alderman.

Dingle
Party	Candidate	Votes	%	±%
Conservative	John Frederick Inman Bamber	3,015	52%	
Labour	Frank Chadwick	2,614	45%	
Communist	William Henry Hart	143	2.5%	
Majority		401		
Registered electors		14,627		
Turnout		5,772	39%	
Conservative gain from Labour		Swing		

=== Pirrie ===
By-election caused by the election of Joseph Morgan (elected as Cllr. for Pirrie in 1955) as Alderman.

Pirrie
Party	Candidate	Votes	%	±%
Labour	William Edward Smith	3,619	53%	
Conservative	Bernard Alexander Ryan	3,230	47%	
Majority		389		
Registered electors		17,632		
Turnout		6,849	39%	
Labour hold		Swing		

=== Picton ===
By-election caused by the election of Charles James Minton (elected as Cllr. for Picton in 1953) as Alderman.

Picton
Party	Candidate	Votes	%	±%
Conservative	Sir Alfred Ernest Shennan	3,636	53%	
Labour	Henry Evans	3,196	47%	
Majority		440		
Registered electors		15,139		
Turnout		6,832	45%	
Conservative hold		Swing		

=== Dovecot ===
By-election caused by the election of Abraham Louis Caplan (elected as Cllr. for Dovecot in 1954) as Alderman.

Dovecot
Party	Candidate	Votes	%	±%
Labour	William Indcox Davies	2,566	52%	
Conservative	Luke Francis Hogan	2,383	48%	
Majority		183		
Registered electors		15,024		
Turnout		4,949	33%	
Labour hold		Swing		

=== Church by-election 27 October 1955 ===
Church
Party	Candidate	Votes	%	±%
Conservative	George William Prout	unopposed		
Majority				
Registered electors				
Turnout				
Conservative hold		Swing		

Alderman Mabel Fletcher M.A. Died on 2 December 1955.

Cllr. Peter James O'Hare was elected by the Councillors as an Alderman on 4 January 1956 and assigned as the Returning Officer for the County ward.
