= Westminster Abbey (disambiguation) =

Westminster Abbey is an Anglican church in Westminster, London, England, where the British monarchs are crowned.

Westminster Abbey may also refer to:

== United Kingdom ==
- Westminster Abbey (UK Parliament constituency), 1918–1950
- Westminster Abbey (London County Council constituency), 1919–1949

== Canada ==
- Westminster Abbey (British Columbia), a monastic community

== See also ==
- Westminster Cathedral, also in London, the largest Catholic church in England and Wales
- Palace of Westminster, the meeting place of the Parliament of the United Kingdom
- Westminster Abbey Choir School, London
- Westminster Abbey Museum, London
