= Statute of Westminster =

The Statute of Westminster may refer to:

- Statute of Westminster 1275, often called the Statute of Westminster I, codified existing law in England in 51 chapters
- Statute of Westminster 1285, often called the Statute of Westminster II, contained the clause De donis conditionalibus
- Quia Emptores of 1290, often called the Statute of Westminster III, prevented tenants from alienating their lands to others by subinfeudation
- Statute of Westminster 1327, first mentioned the military post of Conductor
- Statute of Westminster 1472, mostly noted for requiring ships coming to an English port to bring a tax in bowstaves
- Statute of Westminster 1931, established legislative equality for the self-governing dominions of the British Empire with the United Kingdom

== See also ==
- Statute of Westminster Adoption Act (disambiguation)
