= Westminster Council =

Westminster Council may refer to:

- Westminster City Council, a local authority in London, England
- Westminster Council (Maryland), an American Scouting body
