= New Westminster Royals (disambiguation) =

The New Westminster Royals were a senior ice hockey team from New Westminster.

New Westminster Royals may also refer to:

- New Westminster Salmonbellies, a senior lacrosse team known as the New Westminster Royals for the 1954 season
- Westminster Royals, a former soccer team known as the New Westminster Royals FC from 1948 to 1963
