= Melrose (Liverpool ward) =

Former ward of Liverpool City Council (UK)

Melrose Melrose, Westminster (1973-1979)
- Melrose ward (1980) within Liverpool
- Registered Electors: 9,192 (2003 election)
- Metropolitan borough: City of Liverpool
- Metropolitan county: Merseyside
- Region: North West
- Country: England
- Sovereign state: United Kingdom
- UK Parliament: Liverpool Walton

Melrose ward was an electoral division of Liverpool City Council between 1953 and 2004. It and was centred on the Kirkdale district of Liverpool.

== Background ==
The ward was first formed in 1953, in 1973 it was merged with Westminster ward, its boundaries were changed in 1980 before being dissolved in 2004.

=== 1953 boundaries ===
1953 boundaries

The ward was part of the Liverpool Kirkdale Parliamentary constituency.

=== 1973 boundaries ===
1973 boundaries

Following the Local Government Act 1972 the ward boundaries of the council were altered. The number of wards was reduced from 40 to 33 and the aldermanic system was abolished. Melrose ward was merged with Westminster ward and styled Melrose, Westminster. It returned three councillors.

=== 1980 boundaries ===
A report of the Local Government Boundary Commission for England published in November 1978 set out proposals for changes to the wards of Liverpool City Council, maintaining the number of councillors at 99 representing 33 wards. Melrose ward was re-established to be represented by three councillors.

The report describes the boundaries of Melrose ward as "Commencing at a point where Boundary Street meets Stanley Road, thence northwestwards along said road to Melrose Road, thence northeastwards along said road to Westminster Road, thence northwestwards along said road to the northwestern boundary of the City, thence generally northeastwards along said boundary to the southern boundary of Warbreck Ward, thence eastwards along said boundary to the western boundary of County Ward, thence generally southwards and eastwards along said boundary and southwestwards along Walton lane to the road known as Everton Valley, thence continuing southwestwards along said road and Kirkdale Road to Boundary Street, thence westwards along said street to the point of commencement".

Until 1983 the ward was part of the Liverpool Kirkdale Parliamentary constituency and from 1983 was part of the Liverpool Walton Parliamentary constituency.

=== 2004 election ===
A review by the Boundary Committee for England recommended that the council was formed of a reduced number of 90 members elected from 30 wards. Melrose ward was dissolved and distributed into the rearranged County ward, and the new Kirkdale ward.

== See also ==
- Liverpool City Council
- Liverpool City Council elections 1880–present
- Liverpool Town Council elections 1835 - 1879
