= Westminster, South Africa =

Westminster
- Location within Free State (South African province) Location within South Africa
- Coordinates: 29.166°S 27.15°E
- Country: South Africa
- Province: Free State
- Municipality: Mangaung
- Time zone: UTC+2 (SAST)
- PO box: 9765
- Area code: 051

Westminster is a village 98 km east of Bloemfontein and 40 km west of Ladybrand. It was founded after the Second Anglo-Boer War (1899-1902) by the Duke of Westminster to settle British ex-soldiers, and named after him.
