= Treaty of Westminster =

Treaty of Westminster may refer to:

- Treaty of Westminster (1153), also known as the Treaty of Wallingford
- Treaty of Westminster (1462), also known as the Treaty of Westminster-Ardtornish
- Treaty of Westminster (1511), an alliance during the War of the League of Cambrai
- Treaty of Westminster (1527), an alliance during the War of the League of Cognac
- Treaty of Westminster (1654), ending the First Anglo-Dutch War
- Triple Alliance (1668), concluded in Westminster between Sweden, the General States and Great Britain
- Treaty of Westminster (1674), ending the Third Anglo-Dutch War
- Treaty of Westminster (1756), establishing neutrality between Great Britain and Prussia
- The Statute of Westminster 1931, which transformed the British Empire into the British Commonwealth of Nations, is sometimes referred to (particularly in the former dominions) as a "Treaty" of Westminster
