= 1957 Liverpool City Council election =

1957 UK local election

- 9 May 1957
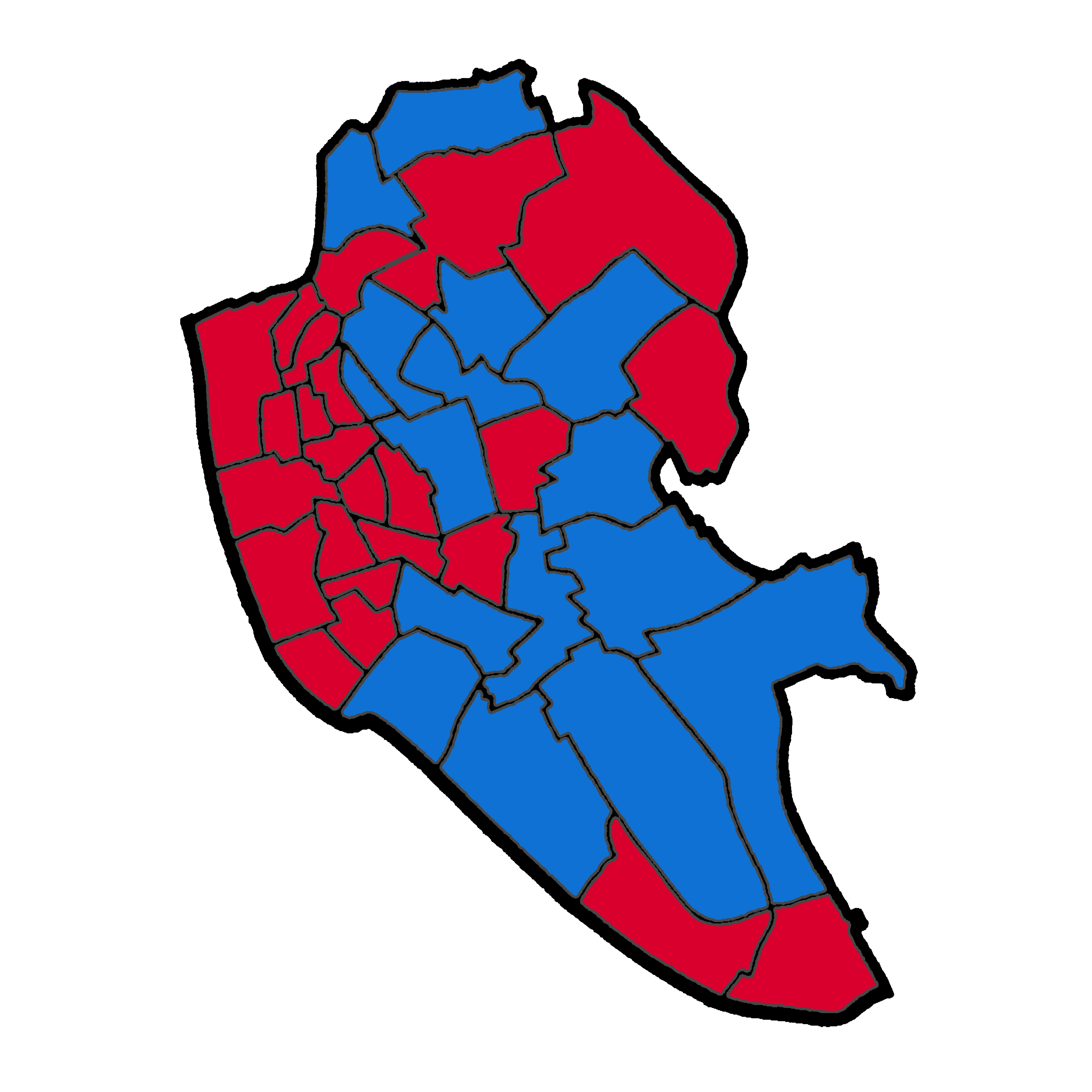
- Map of Liverpool showing wards won (first placed party)

Elections to Liverpool City Council were held on Thursday 9 May 1957.

After the election, the composition of the council was:

Party	Councillors	±	Aldermen
Conservative	52	0	??
Labour	65	0	??
Protestant	2	0	??
Independent Labour Party	1	0	??

== Election result ==
Liverpool local election result 1957
Party	Seats	Gains	Losses	Net gain/loss	Seats %	Votes %	Votes	+/−
Conservative	16	1	1	0	40%	51%	91,963	
Labour	25	1	1	0	62.5%	46%	83,291	
Liberal	0	0	0	0	0%	1%	2,479	
Anti-Debt League	0	0	0	0	0%	0.5%	832	
Communist	0	0	0	0	0%	0.2%	356	

== Ward results ==
* - Councillor seeking re-election

The Councillors seeking re-election at this election were elected in 1954 for a three-year term, therefore comparisons are made with the 1954 election results.

=== Abercromby ===
Abercromby
Party	Candidate	Votes	%	±%
Labour	C. Morris	1,672	45%	
Conservative	A. McVeigh	1,390	37%	
Independent Labour	L. Murphy	520	14%	
Communist	A. M^{c}Clelland	143	4%	
Majority		282		
Registered electors		11,557		
Turnout		3,725	32%	
Labour hold		Swing		

=== Aigburth ===
Aigburth
Party	Candidate	Votes	%	±%
Conservative	J. Maxwell Entwistle ^{(PARTY)}	4,785	89%	
Labour	F. J. McConville	569	11%	
Majority		4,216		
Registered electors		14,097		
Turnout		5,354	38%	
Conservative hold		Swing		

=== Allerton ===
Allerton
Party	Candidate	Votes	%	±%
Conservative	J. McMillan *	2,910	82%	
Labour	M. Black	623	18%	
Majority		2,287		
Registered electors		10,216		
Turnout		3,533	35%	
Conservative hold		Swing		

=== Anfield ===
Anfield
Party	Candidate	Votes	%	±%
Conservative	C. G. S. Gordon	3,560	59%	
Labour	H. Wallace	2,246	37%	
Anti-Debt League	J. R. Gradwell	245	4%	
Majority		1,314		
Registered electors		14,930		
Turnout		6,051	41%	
Conservative hold		Swing		

=== Arundel ===
Arundel
Party	Candidate	Votes	%	±%
Conservative	P. W. Rathbone	3,246	64%	
Labour	F. D. Shemmonds	1,765	35%	
Communist	J. Kay	97	2%	
Majority		1,481		
Registered electors		12,779		
Turnout		5,108	40%	
Conservative hold		Swing		

=== Breckfield ===
Breckfield
Party	Candidate	Votes	%	±%
Conservative	W. A. Lowe ^{(PARTY)}	2,344	51%	
Labour	H. James	2,274	49%	
Majority		70		
Registered electors		11,952		
Turnout		4,618	39%	
Conservative hold		Swing		

=== Broadgreen ===
Broadgreen
Party	Candidate	Votes	%	±%
Conservative	J. Keenan *	2,993	68%	+6%
Labour	G. A. McAllister	1,380	32%	−6%
Majority		1,613		
Registered electors		12,208		
Turnout		4,373	36%	
Conservative gain from Labour		Swing		

=== Central ===
Central
Party	Candidate	Votes	%	±%
Labour	W. McKeown *	1,928	61%	
Conservative	S. J. Chaytor	1,174	37%	
Anti-Debt League	A. P. Cooney	70	2%	
Majority		754		
Registered electors		9,717		
Turnout		3,172	33%	
Labour hold		Swing		

=== Childwall ===
Childwall
Party	Candidate	Votes	%	±%
Conservative	H. W. Hughes *	3,925	72%	
Liberal	R. Globe	948	17%	
Labour	D. Black	551	10%	
Majority		2,977		
Registered electors		14,070		
Turnout		5,424	39%	
Conservative hold		Swing		

=== Church ===
Church
Party	Candidate	Votes	%	±%
Conservative	H. M. Steward *	3,932	75%	
Liberal	Mrs. A. E. Shanks	613	12%	
Labour	J. P. McLean	534	10%	
Anti-Debt League	R. Brennan	130	2%	
Majority		3,319		
Registered electors		14,242		
Turnout		5,209	37%	
Conservative hold		Swing		

=== Clubmoor ===
Clubmoor
Party	Candidate	Votes	%	±%
Conservative	F. H. Wilson *	2,821	48%	
Labour	R. Stoddart	2,610	45%	
Liberal	J. Reilly	388	10%	
Majority		211		
Registered electors		12,115		
Turnout		5,819	48%	
Conservative hold		Swing		

=== County ===
County
Party	Candidate	Votes	%	±%
Labour	H. Dailey *	3,738	53%	
Conservative	R. J. McLaughlin	3,350	47%	
Majority		388		
Registered electors		14,839		
Turnout		7,088	48%	
Conservative hold		Swing		

=== Croxteth ===
Croxteth
Party	Candidate	Votes	%	±%
Conservative	J. J. E. Thompson	3,812	69%	
Labour	J. M. Burke	1,207	22%	
Liberal	W. Russell Dyson	530	10%	
Majority		2,605		
Registered electors		11,608		
Turnout		5,549	48%	
Conservative hold		Swing		

=== Dingle ===
Dingle 2 seats
Party	Candidate	Votes	%	±%
Labour	D. Cumella	3,235	59%	
Labour	Richard Crawshaw	3,197	58%	
Conservative	R. Grace	2,053	37%	
Conservative	A. B. Reilly	1,834	33%	
Anti-Debt League		206	4%	
Majority		1,182		
Registered electors		14,130		
Turnout		5,494	39%	
Labour hold		Swing		

=== Dovecot ===
Dovecot
Party	Candidate	Votes	%	±%
Labour	W. I. Davies ^{(PARTY)}	2,861	60%	
Conservative	P. Tickle	1,940	40%	
Majority		921		
Registered electors		14,806		
Turnout		4,801	32%	
Labour hold		Swing		

=== Everton ===
Everton
Party	Candidate	Votes	%	±%
Labour	A. C. McLeod	2,075	81%	
Independent	M. J. McBride	489	19%	
Majority		2,075		
Registered electors		12,514		
Turnout		2,564	20%	
Labour hold		Swing		

=== Fairfield ===
Fairfield
Party	Candidate	Votes	%	±%
Conservative	W. Thomas *	2,631	59%	
Labour	W. J. Wright	1,853	41%	
Majority		778		
Registered electors		14,830		
Turnout		4,483	30%	
Conservative hold		Swing		

=== Fazakerley ===
Fazakerley
Party	Candidate	Votes	%	±%
Conservative	R. Rattray *	3,191	51%	
Labour	F. J. Grue	3,067	49%	
Majority		124		
Registered electors		12,410		
Turnout		6,258	50%	
Conservative hold		Swing		

=== Gillmoss ===
Gillmoss
Party	Candidate	Votes	%	±%
Labour	C. B. Sharples	3,897	70%	
Conservative	H. R. Butler	1,661	30%	
Majority		2,236		
Registered electors		16,604		
Turnout		5,558	33%	
Labour hold		Swing		

=== Granby ===
Granby
Party	Candidate	Votes	%	±%
Labour	J. Guinan *	2,280	59%	
Conservative	R. A. Parkes	1,567	41%	
Majority		713		
Registered electors		12,142		
Turnout		3,847	32%	
Labour hold		Swing		

=== Kensington ===
Kensington
Party	Candidate	Votes	%	±%
Labour	T. K. Williams *	2,926	61%	
Conservative	A. L. Audley	1,856	39%	
Majority		1,070		
Registered electors		13,254		
Turnout		4,782	36%	
Labour hold		Swing		

=== Low Hill ===
Low Hill
Party	Candidate	Votes	%	±%
Labour	G. M. Scott	1,931	61%	
Conservative	E. Criere	1,240	39%	
Majority		691		
Registered electors		10,898		
Turnout		3,171	29%	
Labour hold		Swing		

=== Melrose ===
Melrose
Party	Candidate	Votes	%	±%
Labour	C. H. Browne *	2,204	70%	
Conservative	J. Smith	964	30%	
Majority		1,240		
Registered electors		10,339		
Turnout		3,168	31%	
Labour hold		Swing		

=== Netherfield ===
Netherfield
Party	Candidate	Votes	%	±%
Labour	T. Robinson *	1,397	57%	
Conservative	T. B. Rutter	1,066	43%	
Majority		331		
Registered electors		9,330		
Turnout		2,463	26%	
Labour hold		Swing		

=== Old Swan ===
Old Swan
Party	Candidate	Votes	%	±%
Labour	J. G. Devine *	3,237	51%	
Conservative	R. J. Cleary	3,083	48%	
Communist	Mrs. W. Cohen	66	1%	
Majority		154		
Registered electors		16,023		
Turnout		6,386	40%	
Labour hold		Swing		

=== Picton ===
Picton
Party	Candidate	Votes	%	±%
Labour	A. G. Roberts	3,044	51%	
Conservative	John Ernest Lockwood	2,917	49%	
Majority		127		
Registered electors		14,851		
Turnout		5,961	40%	
Labour hold		Swing		

=== Pirrie ===
Pirrie
Party	Candidate	Votes	%	±%
Labour	W. Delgarno *	4,396	61%	
Conservative	R. H. Smith	2,781	39%	
Majority		1,615		
Registered electors		17,384		
Turnout		7,177	41%	
Labour hold		Swing		

=== Prince's Park ===
Prince's Park
Party	Candidate	Votes	%	±%
Labour	T. Roberts *	2,575	55%	
Conservative	Mrs. M. Browne	2,116	45%	
Majority		459		
Registered electors		13,825		
Turnout		4,691	34%	
Labour hold		Swing		

=== Sandhills ===
Sandhills
Party	Candidate	Votes	%	±%
Labour	J. Scully	2,177	93%	
Conservative	A. E. Dailey	153	7%	
Majority		2,024		
Registered electors		9,818		
Turnout		2,330	24%	
Labour hold		Swing		

=== St. Domingo ===
St. Domingo
Party	Candidate	Votes	%	±%
Labour	W. R. Maylor *	2,326	59%	
Conservative	T. Hillock	1,631	41%	
Majority		695		
Registered electors		12,575		
Turnout		3,957	31%	
Labour hold		Swing		

=== St. James ===
St. James
Party	Candidate	Votes	%	±%
Labour	T. McManus	2,497	81%	
Conservative	J. Jordan	572	19%	
Majority		1,925		
Registered electors		11,346		
Turnout		3,069	27%	
Labour hold		Swing		

=== St. Mary's ===
St. Mary's
Party	Candidate	Votes	%	±%
Labour	Mrs. P. Henley	2,155	56%	
Conservative	Mrs. D. V. McClelland	1,717	44%	
Majority		438		
Registered electors		11,873		
Turnout		3,872	33%	
Labour hold		Swing		

=== St. Michael's ===
St. Michael's
Party	Candidate	Votes	%	±%
Conservative	W. Browne *	2,757	71%	
Labour	W. Rice-Jones	957	25%	
Anti-Debt League	A. Anderson	157	4%	
Majority		1,800		
Registered electors		10,226		
Turnout		3,871	38%	
Conservative hold		Swing		

=== Smithdown ===
Smithdown
Party	Candidate	Votes	%	±%
Labour	W. Gibbs *	2,589	71%	
Conservative	E. Johnson	1,049	29%	
Majority		1,540		
Registered electors		13,495		
Turnout		3,638	27%	
Labour hold		Swing		

=== Speke ===
Speke
Party	Candidate	Votes	%	±%
Labour	W. H. Sefton *	2,552	69%	
Conservative	C. Dickinson	1,167	31%	
Majority		1,385		
Registered electors		14,020		
Turnout				
Labour hold		Swing		

=== Tuebrook ===
Tuebrook
Party	Candidate	Votes	%	±%
Conservative	E. F. Pine *	3,257	55%	
Labour	E. D, Roderick	2,628	45%	
Majority		629		
Registered electors		13,477		
Turnout		5,885	44%	
Conservative hold		Swing		

=== Vauxhall ===
Vauxhall
Party	Candidate	Votes	%	±%
Labour	W. Deab-Jones	1,497	84%	
Anti-Debt League	C. McBride	230	13%	
Communist	R. Cuerdon	50	3%	
Majority		1,497		
Registered electors		10,233		
Turnout		1,777	17%	
Labour hold		Swing		

=== Warbreck ===
Warbreck
Party	Candidate	Votes	%	±%
Conservative	D.F. Brady *	3,798	61%	
Labour	B. Deane	2,431	39%	
Majority		1,367		
Registered electors		13,856		
Turnout		6,229	45%	
Conservative hold		Swing		

=== Westminster ===
Westminster
Party	Candidate	Votes	%	±%
Labour	R. J. Alcock *	1,840	60%	
Conservative	R. M. Jones	1,213	40%	
Majority		627		
Registered electors		8,363		
Turnout		3,053	37%	
Labour hold		Swing		

=== Woolton ===
Woolton
Party	Candidate	Votes	%	±%
Conservative	J. McAllister	3,507	73%	
Labour	J. Mottram	1,277	27%	
Majority		2,230		
Registered electors		12,729		
Turnout		4,784	38%	
Conservative hold		Swing		
