= Diocese of New Westminster =

Diocese of New Westminster may refer to:

- Anglican Diocese of New Westminster
- Ukrainian Catholic Eparchy of New Westminster
- Roman Catholic Diocese of New Westminster, the former name for the current Roman Catholic Diocese of Vancouver
