= Westminster University =

Westminster University may refer to:

- University of Westminster, London, England
- Westminster University (Utah), US
- Westminster University (Westminster, Colorado), US
