= County (Liverpool ward) =

Metropolitan borough council ward in England

Coordinates: 53.447°N 2.967°W

- County ward within Liverpool
- Population: 11,388 (2021 census)
- Registered Electors: 7,790 (2023 elections)
- Metropolitan borough: City of Liverpool
- Metropolitan county: Merseyside
- Region: North West
- Country: England
- Sovereign state: United Kingdom
- UK Parliament: Liverpool Walton
- Councillors: John Jennings (Labour); Bernard Packenham (Labour)

County ward is an electoral division of Liverpool City Council. The ward is within the Liverpool Walton Parliamentary constituency.

== Background ==
The ward was created in 1953 where three councillors were elected. The boundaries were changed for the 1973 and 1980, 2004 and 2023 elections.

=== 1980 boundaries ===
1980 ward boundaries

A report of the Local Government Boundary Commission for England published in November 1978 set out proposals for changes to the wards of Liverpool City Council, maintaining the number of councillors at 99 representing 33 wards. County ward was represented by three councillors.

The report describes the boundaries as "Commencing at a point where Walton Lane meets Spellow Lane, thence northwards along said Spellow Lane and Goodison Road to Winslow Street, thence northwestwards along said street to County Road, thence northwards and northeastwards along said road and in continuation in a straight line to the centre of the Rice Lane roundabout and the southern boundary of Warbreck Ward, thence generally northeastwards along said boundary to the western boundary of Pirrie Ward, thence southeastwards along said boundary and southwards, northwestwards and southwestwards along the western boundary of Clubmoor Ward to the Liverpool Exchange-Broad Green railway, thence northwestwards along said railway to Walton Lane, thence southwestwards along said lane to the point of commencement".

=== 2004 boundaries ===
2004 ward boundaries

A review by the Boundary Committee for England recommended that the council was formed of a reduced number of 90 members elected from 30 wards. County ward was changed to gain small parts of the former Warbreck ward, and losing parts to the new Clubmoor ward. The ward boundaries follow the northern property line on Taylors Lane, Tressel Street, and Herbarth Close, Rice Lane, Queens Drive, Moor Lane, around the northern boundary of Walton Hall Park, Walton Hall Avenue, Stanley Park Avenue North, the Canada Dock Branch line, Walton Lane, Spellow Lane, Carisbrooke Road until Margaret Road thereafter behind the eastern property line to the Maghull to Liverpool railway.

The population of the 2004 ward at the 2011 census was 14,045.

=== 2023 boundaries ===
In 2023 the ward boundaries were changed following a 2022 review by the Local Government Boundary Commission for England, which decided that the previous 30 wards each represented by three Councillors should be replaced by 64 wards represented by 85 councillors with varying representation by one, two or three councillors per ward. The ward was reformed as a two-member ward, retaining the majority of the former County ward, losing Walton Hall Park and the streets to the north of Breeze Hill to the reformed Walton ward, and the triangle between Queens Drive, Walton Hall Avenue and Stanley Hall Avenue North to the new Clubmoor West ward. The ward contains Goodison Park, Walton Parish Church and Alsop High School.

The population of the ward at the 2021 census was 11,388.

== Councillors ==
Election	Councillor	Councillor	Councillor
2004	Paul Clark (LD)	Karen Afford (LD)	Marilyn Fielding (LD)
2006	Paul Clark (LD)	Karen Afford (LD)	Marilyn Fielding (LD)
2007	Paul Clark (LD)	Karen Afford (LD)	Marilyn Fielding (LD)
2008	Paul Clark (LD)	Karen Afford (LD)	Marilyn Fielding (LD)
2010	Gerard Woodhouse (Lab)	Karen Afford (LD)	Marilyn Fielding (LD)
2011	Gerard Woodhouse (Lab)	Roy Gladden (Lab)	Marilyn Fielding (LD)
2012	Gerard Woodhouse (Lab)	Roy Gladden (Lab)	Eryl Owen (Lab)
2014	Gerard Woodhouse (Lab)	Roy Gladden (Lab)	Eryl Owen (Lab)
2015	Gerard Woodhouse (Lab)	Roy Gladden (Lab)	Eryl Owen (Lab)
2016	Gerard Woodhouse (Lab)	Roy Gladden (Lab)	Kay Davies (Lab)
2018	Gerard Woodhouse (Lab)	Roy Gladden (Lab)	Kay Davies (Lab)
2019	Gerard Woodhouse (Lab)	Roy Gladden (Lab)	Kay Davies (LD)
2021	Gerard Woodhouse (Lab)	Roy Gladden (Lab)	Maureen Delahunty-Kehoe (Lab)
2023	Gerard Woodhouse (Ind)	Roy Gladden (Lab)	Maureen Delahunty-Kehoe (Lab)
WARD REFORMED
2023	John Jennings (Lab)	Bernard Packenham (Lab)	

indicates seat up for re-election after boundary changes.

indicates seat up for re-election.

indicates change in affiliation.

indicates seat up for re-election after casual vacancy.

- Cllr Kay Davies left the Labour Party and joined the Liberal Democrats in 2018 after briefly sitting as an independent.
- Cllr Gerard Woodhouse left the Labour Party after being told he would not be a Labour candidate in the 2023 elections.

== Election results ==
=== Elections of the 2020s ===
Liverpool City Council Municipal Elections 2023: 4th May 2023
Party	Candidate	Votes	%	±%
**Labour**	**John William Jennings**	**1,080**	**33.30**	
**Labour**	**Bernard Edward Packenham**	**922**	**28.43**	
Independent	Gerard Woodhouse	619	19.09	
Independent	Rosemary Nzingha Edwards	197	6.07	
Liberal Democrats	Geoffrey Ronald Bell	181	5.58	
Independent	Rosemary Nzingha Edwards	173	5.33	
Conservative	Louise Margaret Waters	71	2.19	
Majority		461		
Turnout				
Rejected ballots		32		
Total ballots				
Registered electors		7,790		
Labour **win** (new seat)				
Labour **win** (new seat)				

Liverpool City Council Municipal Elections 2021: 6th May 2021
Party	Candidate	Votes	%	±%
**Labour**	**Maureen Patricia Delahunty-Kehoe**	**1,608**	**70.50**	**▼7.14**
Green	Linda Jeanne Jones	213	9.34	▼0.11
Liberal Democrats	Jez Clein	190	8.33	▲1.07
Liberal	Irene Morrison	142	6.23	▲3.56
Conservative	Irene Stuart	128	5.61	▲2.67
Majority		1,395	61.16	▼7.03
Turnout		2281	24.70	▲1.83
Registered electors		9,234		
Rejected ballots		67	2.85	▲1.54
Total ballots		2,348		
Labour **hold**		Swing	-7.15	

=== Elections of the 2010s ===
Liverpool City Council Municipal Elections 2019: 2nd May 2019
Party	Candidate	Votes	%	±%
**Labour**	**Roy Gladden**	**1,635**	**77.64%**	**▼9.00**
Green	Lina Jeanne Jones	199	9.45%	▲6.02
Liberal Democrats	Alex Cottrell	153	7.26	▼6.50
Conservative	Olivia Georgina Lever	62	2.94%	▼0.70
Liberal	Irene Morrison	57	2.67%	▼0.27
Majority		1,436	68.19%	▼12.15
Turnout		2,134	22.87%	▼2.01
Registered electors		9,329		
Rejected ballots		28	1.31%	▲0.88
Labour **hold**		Swing	-7.51%	

Liverpool City Council Municipal Elections 2018: 3rd May 2018
Party	Candidate	Votes	%	±%
Labour	**Gerard Woodhouse**	2,023	86.64%	▲13.45
Liberal Democrats	Robert Charles McAllister-Bell	147	6.30%	▼6.50
Conservative	Olivia Georgina Lever	85	3.64%	▲0.09
Green	Ceri Rhys Jones	80	3.43%	▼6.22
Majority		1,876	80.34%	▲19.95
Turnout		2,345	24.88%	▼2.20
Registered electors		9,427		
Rejected ballots		10	0.43%	
Labour **hold**		Swing	9.98%	

Liverpool City Council Municipal Elections 2016: 5th May 2016
Party	Candidate	Votes	%	±%
Labour	**Kay Eizabeth Davies**	1,813	73.19%	−3.49%
Liberal Democrats	Rachel Plant	317	12.80%	+6.81%
Green	Chris Melia-Jones	239	9.65%	+4.91%
Conservative	Brian James Jones	88	3.55%	+1.30%
TUSC	Lynne Wild	20	0.81%	−0.63%
Majority		1,496	60.39%	−8.11%
Registered electors		9,309		
Turnout		2,521	27.08%	−33.91%
Labour **hold**		Swing	-5.15%	

Liverpool City Council Municipal Elections 2015: 7th May 2015
Party	Candidate	Votes	%	±%
Labour	**Roy Gladden**	4,433	76.68%	−0.34%
UKIP	Robert Thompson	473	8.18%	−6.38%
Liberal Democrats	Karen Elisabeth Afford	346	5.99%	n/a
Green	Ashley Scott-Griffiths	274	4.74%	+1.44%
Conservative	Brian James Jones	130	2.25%	+0.53%
TUSC	Lynne Wild	83	1.44%	n/a
Liberal	Stephen Francis Houghland	42	0.73%	−2.68%
Majority		3,960	68.50%	+6.04%
Registered electors		9,518		
Turnout		5,805	60.99%	+31.92%
Labour **hold**		Swing	3.02%	

Liverpool City Council Municipal Elections 2014: 22nd May 2014
Party	Candidate	Votes	%	±%
Labour	**Gerard Woodhouse**	2,148	77.02%	−5.82%
UKIP	Neil Kenny	406	14.56%	+8.63%
Liberal	Stephen Francis Houghland	95	3.41%	+1.55%
Green	Tony Jones	92	3.30%	1.05%
Conservative	Brian James Jones	48	1.72%	+0.18%
Majority		1,742	62.46%	−14.45%
Turnout		2789	29.07%	−1.02%
Labour **hold**		Swing	-7.22%	

Liverpool City Council Municipal Elections 2012: 3rd May 2012
Party	Candidate	Votes	%	±%
Labour	**Eryl Marshall Owen**	2,360	82.84%	+9.15%
UKIP	Thomas Marsden Bodcock	169	5.93%	n/a
Liberal Democrats	Michael Thomas Sefton	142	4.98%	−10.04%
Green	Tony Jones	64	2.25%	+0.57%
Liberal	Stephen Houghland	53	1.86%	+1.01%
Conservative	John Ainsley Watson	44	1.54%	−0.39%
British Freedom	Peter James Stafford	17	0.60%	n/a
Majority		2,191	76.91%	+18.24%
Turnout		2,849	30.09%	−3.18%
Labour **gain** from Liberal Democrats		Swing	+1.61%	

Liverpool City Council Municipal Elections 2011: 5th May 2011
Party	Candidate	Votes	%	±%
Labour	**Roy Butler Gladden**	**2330**	**73.69%**	+13.02%
Liberal Democrats	Karen Elisabeth Afford	475	15.02%	−15.81%
UKIP	Tom Bodcock	138	4.36%	n/a
TUSC	Roger Bannister	78	2.47%	n/a
Conservative	John Astley Watson	61	1.93%	−1.09%
Green	Tony Jones	53	1.68%	+0.5%
Liberal	Stephen Francis Houghland	27	0.85%	n/a
Majority		1855	58.67%	+28.83
Turnout		3162	33.27%	−19.55%
Labour **gain** from Liberal Democrats		Swing	14.42%	

Liverpool City Council Municipal Elections 2010: County
Party	Candidate	Votes	%	±%
Labour	**Gerard Woodhouse**	**3131**	**60.67%**	
Liberal Democrats	Ruth Gould	1591	30.83%	
BNP	Peter James Stafford	222	4.30%	
Conservative	Angela Maria Oates	156	3.02%	
Green	Tony Jones	61	1.18%	
Majority		1540	29.84%	
Turnout		5161	52.82%	
Labour **gain** from Liberal Democrats		Swing		

=== Elections of the 2000s ===
Liverpool City Council Municipal Elections 2008: County
Party	Candidate	Votes	%	±%
Liberal Democrats	**Marilyn Fielding**	**1196**	**42.70%**	
Labour	Gerard Woodhouse	1189	42.45%	
BNP	Peter James Stafford	200	7.14%	
UKIP	Colin Windever	70	2.50%	
Conservative	Paul Martyn Barber	66	2.36%	
Green	Tony Jones	48	1.71%	
Liberal	Roger George Webb	32	1.14%	
Majority				
Turnout		2801	27.66%	
Liberal Democrats **hold**		Swing		

Liverpool City Council Municipal Elections 2007: County
Party	Candidate	Votes	%	±%
Liberal Democrats	**Karen Afford**	**1541**	**58.46%**	
Labour	Colin McAlley	859	32.59%	
Conservative	Jennifer Kelly	62	2.35%	
Liberal	Roger George Webb	53	2.01%	
Majority				
Turnout		2636	25.53%	
Liberal Democrats **hold**		Swing		

Liverpool City Council Municipal Elections 2006: County
Party	Candidate	Votes	%	±%
Liberal Democrats	**Paul Clark**	**1380**	**52.73%**	
Labour	Patrick Delahunty	1080	41.27%	
Liberal	Roger George Webb	84	3.21%	
Conservative	Francis Victor Stevens	73	2.79%	
Majority				
Turnout		2617	24.07%	
Liberal Democrats **hold**		Swing		

After the boundary change of 2004 the whole of Liverpool City Council faced election. Three Councillors were returned.

Liverpool City Council Municipal Elections 2004: County
Party	Candidate	Votes	%	±%
Liberal Democrats	**Marilyn Fielding**	**2067**		
Liberal Democrats	**Karen Afford**	**1881**		
Liberal Democrats	**Paul Clark**	**1869**		
Labour	Gary Booth	1515		
Labour	Patrick Delahunty	1515		
Labour	Jeanette Fearon	1440		
Liberal	Roger Webb	96		
Liberal	Thomas Newell	95		
Liberal	Damian O'Brien	60		
Majority				
Turnout		3824	34.33%	
Liberal Democrats **hold**		Swing	n/a	

• italics - Denotes sitting Councillor.
• bold - Denotes the winning candidate.
