= Trevor Jones (British politician) =

British politician (1926–2016)

Sir Owen Trevor Jones (17 December 1926 – 8 September 2016) was a British Liberal Democrat politician and member of the Liverpool City Council.

== Family ==
Jones was the son of Owen and Ada Jones of Dyserth, Denbighshire. His wife, Lady Doreen Jones, is a former Lord Mayor of Liverpool. He has a son, Glyn, and daughter, Louise, and three grandchildren, Thomas, George and Ayesha. His daughter-in-law, Mia Jones, was a Liberal Democrat councillor for Chester City Council and a candidate for Chester in the 2005 General Election.

== Politics ==
=== Local politics ===
Jones was brought into politics in 1966 when a proposed ring road threatened the demolition of his chandlery business' warehouse. He was elected to Liverpool City Council in 1968. He led the Liverpool Liberal Party to control of Liverpool City Council in 1973. He became deputy leader and chair of housing in 1975 and then became Liberal group leader when Bill Smyth lost his seat on the council. His deputy became David Alton, who had been the whip, and he appointed Paul Mahon as group whip. He then had Mike Storey as his deputy from 1980 to 1991.

He served as leader of the council from 1978 to 1983, and between 1978 to 1979 the Liverpool Liberals were in an alliance with the Liverpool Conservatives. Due to party tensions in the council, Labour chaired the majority of committees in 1979-80 – but he won the vote to remain leader, serving until Liverpool Labour gained overall control of the council in 1983 – before becoming leader again for two months in 1987 at the head of a temporary administration when 49 Labour councillors were surcharged and disqualified from office by the district auditor after refusing to set a rate. He retired in 1991. In 2003, he returned to public service when he was elected again to Liverpool City Council, serving until 2010.

He was the dominant Liberal influence in the city for decades. Jones formalised and finessed the practice of community politics for the Liberal Party, later the Liberal Democrats. In the 1960s, he developed new campaigning strategies including the delivery of Focus – a leaflet based on local issues that electors' identified with – that is still ubiquitous for Liberal Democrats. He was not its originator, indeed he was far too practical to be a theorist, but he developed the use of Focus and made it his trademark. As an organiser, Jones had phenomenal energy and ambitions to match. He earned the nickname "Jones the Vote" – a reference to his Welsh heritage – for the way he masterminded electoral campaigns, especially by-elections.

=== National politics ===
Following his initial successes for the party in Liverpool, Jones took an interest in national politics. In 1972, he was elected president of the Liberal Party, serving a one-year term. During that year, he took a high profile in the parliamentary by-elections the party fought, overseeing four victories: Sutton and Cheam, Berwick-upon-Tweed, Ripon and Isle of Ely. At the February 1974 general election, he stood as Liberal candidate in Liverpool Toxteth, and at the general election later that year in October, he contested Gillingham. Jones was also heavily involved in the by-election win at Liverpool Edge Hill by David Alton in 1979 with a 36% swing.

He was knighted in 1981. He died on 8 September 2016 after suffering from cancer.

Party political offices
Preceded by Stephen Terrell	President of the Liberal Party; 1972–1973	Succeeded by Rhys Lloyd
Political offices
Preceded by John Hamilton	Leader of Liverpool City Council; 1978–1983	Succeeded by John Hamilton
