= 1973 Liverpool City Council election =

1973 UK local government election

← 1972	10 May 1973	1975 →

99 of 99 seats to Liverpool City Council following the reduction in the number of Councillors from 120 to 99 and the abolition of Aldermen. The Local Government Act 1972 changed the election timetable from election by thirds every three years to election by thirds every four years with the fallow year having elections to Merseyside County Council. 50 seats needed for a majority

Elections to Liverpool City Council were held on 10 May 1973.

Following boundary changes, which reduced the number of wards from 40 to 33, three councillors were elected for each ward. This was the first Council since Aldermen were abolished.

After the election, the composition of the council was:

Party	Seats	±
Liberal	48	+34
Labour	42	-12
Conservative	9	-22

== Election result ==
Liverpool local election result 1973
Party	Seats	Gains	Losses	Net gain/loss	Seats %	Votes %	Votes	+/−
Liberal	48	34	0	+34	48%	35%	116,421	
Labour	42	4	16	-12	42%	36%	117,749	
Conservative	9	3	25	-22	9.1%	27%	90,344	
Communist	0	0	0	0	0%	0.5%	1,472	
Others	0	0	0	0	0%	0.47%	1,518	

== Ward results ==
* - Councillor seeking re-election

^{(PARTY)} - Party of former Councillor

=== Abercromby, St. James' ===
Abercromby, St. James'
Party	Candidate	Votes	%	±%
Labour	E. Shields *	1,994	65%	
Labour	O. Doyle *	1,903	62%	
Labour	V. McCoy ^{(PARTY)}	1,790	58%	
Liberal	C. O'Connor	302	10%	
Liberal	M. K. Richards	253	8%	
Liberal	J. Moxon	249	8%	
Conservative	P. J. Robinson	177	6%	
Conservative	A. H. Wynn	162	5%	
Conservative	H. R. Tetlow	152	5%	
Communist	R. O'Hara	409	13%	
Tomorrow's Youth	J.B. Smith	180	6%	
Majority		1,585		
Registered electors				
Turnout		3,062		
Labour win (new seat)				
Labour win (new seat)				
Labour win (new seat)				

=== Aigburth ===
Aigburth
Party	Candidate	Votes	%	±%
Liberal	Ian. R. Porteous	3,472	55%	
Liberal	Willam. R. Dyson	3,443	54%	
Liberal	Len Tyrer	3,366	53%	
Conservative	J. E. R. Fischer *	2,336	37%	
Conservative	H. G. Francis *	2,183	34%	
Conservative	E. M. Clein ^{(PARTY)}	2,061	32%	
Labour	K. M. Stewart	541	9%	
Labour	R. Fogg	411	6%	
Majority		1,136		
Registered electors				
Turnout		6,349		
Liberal win (new seat)				
Liberal win (new seat)				
Liberal win (new seat)				

=== Allerton ===
Allerton
Party	Candidate	Votes	%	±%
Conservative	William. H. Fearnside ^{(PARTY)}	1,697	47%	
Conservative	Raymond. F. Craine ^{(PARTY)}	1,693	47%	
Conservative	John. S. Ross ^{(PARTY)}	1,674	46%	
Liberal	Mrs. S. Carr	1,518	42%	
Liberal	D. Stobbs	1,363	37%	
Liberal	Mrs. E. Feldman	1,333	37%	
Labour	J. E. McPherson	423	12%	
Labour	R. McConnell	420	12%	
Labour	C. McDonald	417	11%	
Majority		178		
Registered electors				
Turnout		3,638		
Conservative win (new seat)				
Conservative win (new seat)				
Conservative win (new seat)				

=== Anfield ===
Anfield
Party	Candidate	Votes	%	±%
Liberal	Joseph. Robert Wilmington	1,909	44%	
Liberal	J. Wilde	1,780	41%	
Liberal	R. Donnelly	1,706	39%	
Labour	F. McGurk *	1,376	32%	
Labour	R. J. Short	1,263	29%	
Labour	W. H. Sefton	1,228	28%	
Conservative	Mrs. M. Fitzsimmons *	1,059	24%	
Conservative	B. Wilson ^{(PARTY)}	1,031	24%	
Conservative	A. C. Bailey	965	22%	
Majority		533		
Registered electors				
Turnout		4,344		
Liberal win (new seat)				
Liberal win (new seat)				
Liberal win (new seat)				

=== Arundel ===
Arundel
Party	Candidate	Votes	%	±%
Liberal	Nick. Wood *	2,385	60%	
Liberal	Charles. Hutchinson *	2,230	56%	
Liberal	Kenneth. O. Rainford	2,202	56%	
Labour	A. E. Janes	818	21%	
Labour	K. Jones	795	20%	
Labour	P. V. Wall	788	20%	
Conservative	Fairclough	748	19%	
Conservative	M. Kingston	736	19%	
Conservative	E. W. Mossford	731	18%	
Majority		1,577		
Registered electors				
Turnout		3,961		
Liberal hold		Swing		
Liberal hold		Swing		
Liberal gain from Conservative		Swing		

=== Breckfield, St. Domingo ===
Breckfield, St. Domingo
Party	Candidate	Votes	%	±%
Liberal	Peter. B. Chivall	1,483	54%	
Liberal	David. J. Hartley	1,326	48%	
Liberal	Frank. McNevin	1,254	46%	
Labour	J. Connolly	869	32%	
Labour	L. Williams *	790	29%	
Labour	T. Roberts *	733	27%	
Conservative	K. B. Jacques *	390	14%	
Conservative	D. J. Lewis	375	14%	
Conservative	F. G. Pugh	357	13%	
Majority		614		
Registered electors				
Turnout		2,742		
Liberal gain from Conservative		Swing		
Liberal gain from Labour		Swing		
Liberal gain from Labour		Swing		

=== Broadgreen ===
Broadgreen
Party	Candidate	Votes	%	±%
Liberal	Roger Johnston *	2,452	62%	
Liberal	G. J. Palmer *	2,305	58%	
Liberal	Rosie Cooper	2,191	56%	
Conservative	Mrs. D. I. Keenan *	942	24%	
Conservative	J. J. Swainbank	838	24%	
Conservative	B. V. Grombridge	736	19%	
Labour	F. Burke	547	14%	
Labour	M. J. Getty	483	12%	
Labour	L. P. Hyams	435	11%	
Majority		1,510		
Registered electors				
Turnout		3,941		
Liberal hold		Swing		
Liberal hold		Swing		
Liberal gain from Conservative		Swing		

=== Central, Everton, Netherfield ===
Central, Everton, Netherfield
Party	Candidate	Votes	%	±%
Labour	J. Parry *	1,627	66%	
Labour	J. E. Walker *	1,442	58%	
Labour	J. Finnegan ^{(PARTY)}	1,425	58%	
Conservative	P. J. Palmer	474	19%	
Conservative	W. Owens	464	19%	
Conservative	R. S. Charles	380	19%	
Liberal	J. F. Owen	365	15%	
Majority		1,153		
Registered electors				
Turnout		2,466		
Labour hold		Swing		
Labour hold		Swing		
Labour hold		Swing		

=== Childwall ===
Childwall
Party	Candidate	Votes	%	±%
Liberal	William Anthony Limont *	3,055	50%	
Liberal	Willam. Smyth	2,848	47%	
Liberal	Willam. Mellor	2,817	47%	
Conservative	W. A. N. Fearenside *	2,314	38%	
Conservative	S. Airey ^{(PARTY)}	2,245	37%	
Conservative	T. P. Pink	2,170	36%	
Labour	P. Collins	685	11%	
Labour	Mrs. E. Kelly	572	9%	
Labour	D. S. Johnson	527	9%	
Majority		810		
Registered electors				
Turnout		6,054		
Liberal gain from Conservative		Swing		
Liberal gain from Conservative		Swing		
Liberal hold		Swing		

=== Church ===
Church
Party	Candidate	Votes	%	±%
Liberal	Cyril Eric Carr *	3,463	62%	
Liberal	Grace. R. Andrews ^{(PARTY)}	3,143	57%	
Liberal	Michael. Wanless ^{(PARTY)}	3,109	56%	
Conservative	J. P. Smith	1,804	32%	
Conservative	W. H. Stabback	1,788	32%	
Conservative	K. W. Davies	1,770	32%	
Labour	A. L. Jones	286	5%	
Labour	F. Dunne	212	4%	
Labour	G. M. Scott	185	3%	
Majority		1,659		
Registered electors				
Turnout		5,553		
Liberal hold		Swing		
Liberal hold		Swing		
Liberal hold		Swing		

=== Clubmoor ===
Clubmoor
Party	Candidate	Votes	%	±%
Liberal	John Bowen	1,533	45%	
Liberal	C. Simmond	1,311	38%	
Liberal	Michael John Storey	1,302	38%	
Labour	J. M. Burke *	1,137	33%	
Labour	M. Stewart	1,126	33%	
Labour	G. G. Pratt *	1,059	31%	
Conservative	F. R. Butler	750	22%	
Conservative	F. Jones *	2,074	21%	
Conservative	P. K. Mostyn	669	20%	
Majority		396		
Registered electors				
Turnout		3,420		
Liberal gain from Conservative		Swing		
Liberal gain from Conservative		Swing		
Liberal gain from Labour		Swing		

=== County ===
County
Party	Candidate	Votes	%	±%
Labour	J. McLean *	1,570	44%	
Labour	E. T. Mooney *	1,503	42%	
Labour	F. P. Hughes	1,465	41%	
Conservative	P. Tunna *	1,035	29%	
Liberal	W. Savage	970	27%	
Liberal	Mrs. E. A. Ousby	944	26%	
Conservative	W. Thomas	941	26%	
Liberal	J. J. Hastings	938	26%	
Conservative	H. Brown	925	29%	
Majority		535		
Registered electors				
Turnout		3,575		
Labour gain from Conservative		Swing		
Labour gain from Conservative		Swing		
Labour hold		Swing		

=== Croxteth ===
Croxteth
Party	Candidate	Votes	%	±%
Liberal	J. Holmes ^{(PARTY)}	2,759	58%	
Liberal	T. Blyde	2,540	54%	
Liberal	W. T. Brodie	2,506	53%	
Conservative	G. B. Watterson ^{(PARTY)}	1,413	30%	
Conservative	T. Larty *	1,288	27%	
Conservative	C. Dickinson	1,206	26%	
Labour	Mrs. C. A. George	554	12%	
Labour	M. J. Powell	544	12%	
Labour	M. W. Cooper	505	11%	
Majority		1,346		
Registered electors				
Turnout		4,726		
Liberal gain from Conservative		Swing		
Liberal gain from Conservative		Swing		
Liberal hold		Swing		

=== Dingle ===
Dingle
Party	Candidate	Votes	%	±%
Labour	Mrs. M. Evans *	1,236	64%	
Labour	R. Stoddart *	1,125	58%	
Labour	S. W. Jones *	1,040	54%	
Conservative	T. J. Staniford	306	16%	
Conservative	Mrs. M. Gregson	305	16%	
Conservative	A. J. Browne	294	15%	
Liberal	M. Greenop	289	15%	
Liberal	Mrs. S. O'Kane	276	14%	
Liberal	Mrs. M. Wain	275	14%	
Communist	J. Cook	112	6%	
Majority		930		
Registered electors				
Turnout		1,943		
Labour hold		Swing		
Labour hold		Swing		
Labour hold		Swing		

=== Dovecot ===
Dovecot
Party	Candidate	Votes	%	±%
Labour	E. Burke *	1,999	69%	
Labour	W. F. Johnson *	1,952	67%	
Labour	W. H. Westbury *	1,833	63%	
Conservative	J. L. Walsh	918	31%	
Conservative	Mrs. J. H. Brendwood	807	28%	
Conservative	Mrs. F. Campbell	807	28%	
Majority		1,081		
Registered electors				
Turnout		2,917		
Labour hold		Swing		
Labour hold		Swing		
Labour hold		Swing		

=== Fairfield ===
Fairfield
Party	Candidate	Votes	%	±%
Liberal	Charles. Crawford	1,787	53%	
Liberal	James. A. Gallagher	1,631	49%	
Liberal	Tom. Morton	1,504	45%	
Labour	H. Livermore *	1,045	31%	
Labour	S. F. Jacobs	1,034	31%	
Labour	J. Mottram	914	27%	
Conservative	W. Scott	527	16%	
Conservative	W. McGuirk	508	15%	
Conservative	N. M. Wilkinson	501	15%	
Majority		742		
Registered electors				
Turnout		3,359		
Liberal gain from Conservative		Swing		
Liberal gain from Conservative		Swing		
Liberal gain from Labour		Swing		

=== Fazakerley ===
Fazakerley
Party	Candidate	Votes	%	±%
Labour	A. Williams *	1,948	57%	
Labour	F. Gater *'	1,776	52%	
Labour	H. James	1,734	51%	
Conservative	W. T. Palmer ^{(PARTY)}	1,444	43%	
Conservative	G. Smith	1,382	43%	
Conservative	I. J. Brown	1,333	39%	
Majority		502		
Registered electors				
Turnout		3,392		
Labour gain from Conservative		Swing		
Labour hold		Swing		
Labour hold		Swing		

=== Gillmoss ===
Gillmoss
Party	Candidate	Votes	%	±%
Labour	E. Loyden *	2,254	69%	
Labour	T. Higgins *	2,254	69%	
Labour	J. J. Cruikshank ^{(PARTY)}	2,139	66%	
Conservative	R. Pippard	809	25%	
Conservative	D. P. Dougherty	773	24%	
Conservative	W. G. Henri	710	22%	
Communist	K. Dunlop	198	6%	
Majority		1,445		
Registered electors				
Turnout		3,261		
Labour hold		Swing		
Labour hold		Swing		
Labour hold		Swing		

=== Granby, Prince's Park ===
Granby, Prince's Park
Party	Candidate	Votes	%	±%
Labour	Dr. C. Taylor *	2,113	66%	
Labour	J.D. Hamilton *	2,006	62%	
Labour	A. Doswell *	1,963	61%	
Conservative	Miss O. Y. Hughes	875	27%	
Conservative	N. Jones	818	25%	
Conservative	S. C. Rankin	795	25%	
Communist	T. McLelland	226	7%	
Majority		1,238		
Registered electors				
Turnout		3,214		
Labour hold		Swing		
Labour hold		Swing		
Labour hold		Swing		

=== Kensington ===
Kensington
Party	Candidate	Votes	%	±%
Liberal	John. R. Watton	1,798	85%	
Liberal	Frank. N. E. Snowden			
Liberal	Frank Doran	1,471	70%	
Labour	S. G. Thorne *			
Labour	C. Parry *	975	46%	
Labour	E. D. Roderick *			
Conservative	Miss J. P. Ashcroft	316	15%	
Majority				
Registered electors				
Turnout				
Liberal gain from Labour		Swing		
Liberal gain from Labour		Swing		
Liberal gain from Labour		Swing		

=== Low Hill, Smithdown ===
Low Hill, Smithdown
Party	Candidate	Votes	%	±%
Liberal	David Alton *	1,956	70%	
Liberal	E. A. Bestwick	1,733	62%	
Liberal	Ernest. Richard Stephenson	1,622	58%	
Labour	H. Lee ^{(PARTY)}	659	24%	
Labour	W. R. Snell *	617	23%	
Labour	C. H. Winter	615	22%	
Conservative	V. Brookes	180	6%	
Conservative	N. M. Hamilton	125	4%	
Conservative	M. L. Pearl	112	4%	
Majority		1,297		
Registered electors				
Turnout		2,795		
Liberal gain from Labour		Swing		
Liberal gain from Labour		Swing		
Liberal hold		Swing		

=== Melrose, Westminster ===
Melrose, Westminster
Party	Candidate	Votes	%	±%
Labour	G. Ackers *	1,642	63%	
Labour	J. Gardner ^{(PARTY)}	1,642	63%	
Labour	W. Lafferty ^{(PARTY)}	1,573	61%	
Conservative	J. Gillin	598	23%	
Conservative	W. Gillbody	524	20%	
Conservative	J. Wareing	406	16%	
Liberal	A. R. Clarke	349	13%	
Liberal	J. Gillespie	325	13%	
Majority		1,044		
Registered electors				
Turnout		2,589		
Labour hold		Swing		
Labour hold		Swing		
Labour hold		Swing		

=== Old Swan ===
Old Swan
Party	Candidate	Votes	%	±%
Liberal	Doreen Jones *	2,061	54%	+6%
Liberal	Peter Mahon. Mahon ^{(PARTY)}	1,699	44%	−4%
Liberal	William. M. Galbraith *	1,688	44%	−4%
Conservative	J. Howard	775	20%	−13%
Conservative	H. Davies	769	20%	−13%
Conservative	T. M. Elliott	752	20%	−13%
Labour	T. McManus	650	17%	−2%
Labour	V. P. Hyams	645	17%	−2%
Labour	B. J. Chantrell	569	15%	−4%
Independent Liberal	W. J. McCullough	350	9%	
Majority		1,286		
Registered electors				
Turnout		3,836		
Liberal hold		Swing		
Liberal hold		Swing		
Liberal hold		Swing		

=== Picton ===
Picton
Party	Candidate	Votes	%	±%
Liberal	Paul Desmond Mahon	1,897	51%	+51%
Liberal	R. Madeley	1,869	50%	+50%
Liberal	E. Herbert. Herrity	1,859	50%	+50%
Labour	A. Fletcher ^{(PARTY)}	1,181	31%	−17%
Labour	T. Bailey *	1,151	31%	−17%
Labour	Mrs. S. Aspin	1,112	30%	−18%
Conservative	R. J. Wilde	575	15%	−35%
Conservative	J. McDermott	567	15%	−35%
Conservative	H. F. Davies	542	14%	−36%
Communist	E. Hanna	98	3%	+1%
Majority		121		
Registered electors				
Turnout		3,751		
Liberal gain from Labour		Swing		
Liberal gain from Labour		Swing		
Liberal gain from Conservative		Swing		

=== Pirrie ===
Pirrie
Party	Candidate	Votes	%	±%
Labour	H. Dalton *	2,434	66%	+6%
Labour	M. Black *	2,251	61%	+1%
Labour	P. Owens *	2,208	60%	0%
Conservative	R. Gould	1,274	34%	−4%
Conservative	A. Brown	1,257	34%	−4%
Conservative	J. F. Atkinson	1,178	32%	−6%
Majority		1,160		
Registered electors				
Turnout		3,708		
Labour hold		Swing		
Labour hold		Swing		
Labour hold		Swing		

=== St. Mary's ===
St. Mary's
Party	Candidate	Votes	%	±%
Labour	S. R. Maddox *	1,424	51%	
Labour	G. T. Walsh ^{(PARTY)}	1,331	48%	
Labour	R. C. Evans *	1,329	48%	
Liberal	Graham Hulme	756	27%	
Liberal	I. M. Hawkins	741	27%	
Liberal	B. Johnson	734	26%	
Conservative	J. Boardman	606	22%	
Conservative	G. F. Brewer	585	21%	
Conservative	M. B. Glass	577	21%	
Majority		668		
Registered electors				
Turnout		2,786		
Labour hold		Swing		
Labour hold		Swing		
Labour hold		Swing		

=== St. Michael's ===
St. Michael's
Party	Candidate	Votes	%	±%
Liberal	Trevor Jones	1,686	58%	
Liberal	Michael. O'Kane	1,606	55%	
Liberal	George. Wain	1,571	54%	
Conservative	I. McFall	799	27%	
Conservative	A. H. K. Maynard	775	27%	
Conservative	J. Cheshire	774	27%	
Labour	L. Collins	372	13%	
Labour	H. P. Walker	348	12%	
Labour	F. Cox	344	12%	
Communist	Hennessy	62	2%	
Majority		887		
Registered electors				
Turnout		2,919		
Liberal hold		Swing		
Liberal gain from Conservative		Swing		
Liberal gain from Conservative		Swing		

=== Sandhills, Vauxhall ===
Sandhills, Vauxhall
Party	Candidate	Votes	%	±%
Labour	P. Orr *	1,523	57%	−3%
Labour	A.Dunford *	1,523	56%	−4%
Labour	J. Morgan ^{(PARTY)}	1,523	53%	−7%
Tennants	T. King	988	37%	
Tennants	B. Doyle	969	36%	
Tennants	B. Rutter	915	34%	
Conservative	J. Barton	183	7%	−31%
Conservative	N. J. Fagin	139	5%	−33%
Conservative	K. A. Jones	127	5%	−33%
Majority		535		
Registered electors				
Turnout		2,694		
Labour hold		Swing		
Labour hold		Swing		
Labour hold		Swing		

=== Speke ===
Speke
Party	Candidate	Votes	%	±%
Labour	G. J. Maudsley *	2,150	69%	−7%
Labour	K. Stewart *	2,121	68%	−6%
Labour	P. Moorhead *	2,114	68%	−6%
Conservative	D. J. V. Collister	615	20%	−18%
Conservative	D. Coleman	605	19%	−19%
Conservative	H. Phillips	588	19%	−19%
Liberal	J. Refferon	348	11%	
Liberal	B. P. Higginson	337	11%	
Liberal	C. Wilson	279	9%	
Majority		1,535		
Registered electors				
Turnout		3,113		
Labour hold		Swing		
Labour hold		Swing		
Labour hold		Swing		

=== Tuebrook ===
Tuebrook
Party	Candidate	Votes	%	±%
Liberal	Michael Heffernon	1,580	43%	
Liberal	Richard Clitherow	1,578	43%	
Liberal	Charles H. Stocker	1,513	41%	
Labour	J. E. Roberts *	1,084	30%	
Labour	D. M. Mitchell *	1,062	29%	
Labour	J. B. Johnston	1,000	27%	
Conservative	D. E. Daniel ^{(PARTY)}	878	24%	
Conservative	J. Irving	767	21%	
Conservative	C. E. Jennings	736	20%	
Communist	J. Jackson	109	3%	
Majority		496		
Registered electors				
Turnout		3,651		
Liberal gain from Conservative		Swing		
Liberal gain from Labour		Swing		
Liberal gain from Labour		Swing		

=== Warbreck ===
Warbreck
Party	Candidate	Votes	%	±%
Conservative	R. B. Flude ^{(PARTY)}	1,627	53%	−9%
Conservative	J. H. Brash	1,553	51%	−11%
Conservative	D. J. Jones	1,545	51%	−11%
Labour	Mrs. C. O'Rourke ^{(PARTY)}	1,422	47%	+9%
Labour	J. Hughes ^{(PARTY)}	1,405	46%	+8%
Labour	E. W. Gorman	1,395	46%	+8%
Majority		205		
Registered electors				
Turnout		3,049		
Conservative hold		Swing		
Conservative gain from Labour		Swing		
Conservative gain from Labour		Swing		

=== Woolton, East ===
Woolton, East
Party	Candidate	Votes	%	±%
Labour	L. Evans	1,988	74%	
Labour	Mrs. M. Delaney	1,884	70%	
Labour	W. Wright	1,786	66%	
Conservative	N. F. Derrick	442	16%	
Conservative	J. McKeivie	410	15%	
Conservative	P. Pink	380	14%	
Majority		1,546		
Registered electors				
Turnout		2,688		
Labour gain from Conservative		Swing		
Labour hold		Swing		
Labour hold		Swing		

=== Woolton, West ===
Woolton, West
Party	Candidate	Votes	%	±%
Conservative	Mrs. R. Dean	2,821	57%	+7%
Conservative	A. McVeigh	2,772	56%	+6%
Conservative	C. G. Hallows	2,716	55%	+5%
Liberal	Mrs. A. Bailey	1,367	28%	
Liberal	E. S. Abanson	1,296	26%	
Liberal	Mrs. Hackman	1,274	26%	
Labour	J. P. McCormack	753	15%	−35%
Labour	K. Simpson	713	14%	−36%
Labour	G. R. Sullivan	704	14%	−36%
Majority		1,454		
Registered electors				
Turnout		4,941		
Conservative hold		Swing		
Conservative hold		Swing		
Conservative gain from Labour		Swing		

== By Elections ==
Low Hill, Smithdown and Speke held on 21 March 1974, before the AGM of April 1.

=== Low Hill, Smithdown ===
Low Hill, Smithdown
Party	Candidate	Votes	%	±%
Liberal	David J Davies *	1513		%
Labour	C H Winter	1455		
Conservative	Fagan	151		
Majority		58		
Registered electors		9,368		
Turnout		3,019	30%	
Liberal hold		Swing		

=== Speke ===
Speke
Party	Candidate	Votes	%	±%
Labour	Raymond Short	2,391	50%	+13%
Liberal	McKitterick *	250	42%	−13%
Conservative	Philip	427	8%	−1%
Majority		470		
Registered electors		14,502		
Turnout		6,096	42%	
Conservative gain from Liberal		Swing		

=== St Michael’s ===
St Michael's
Party	Candidate	Votes	%	±%
Conservative	J. S. Ross *	2,217	57%	+10%
Liberal	T. H. Harte	1,190	30%	−12%
Labour	T. Bailey	505	13%	
Majority		1,027		
Registered electors		10,801		
Turnout		3,912	36%	
Conservative hold		Swing		

== Council Leadership ==
This would come into effect on 1 April 1974.

Position	Holder
Leader of the Council and Chair of Policy and Finance Committee	Cyril Carr
Deputy Leader of the Council and Chair of Housing and Planning Committee	Bill Smyth
Chair of Education Committee	John Bowen
Chair of the Highways and Environment Committee	Doreen Jones
Chair of the Community Development Committee	Nicholas Wood
Chair of Social Services Committee	William Galbraith
Chair of Libraries and Leisure Services Committee	Roger Johnston
Chair of General Services Committee	Richard Clitherow
Liberal Group Whip	Roger Johnston
Leader of the Opposition and Labour Group	John Hamilton
Deputy Leader of the Opposition and Labour Group	Eddie Loyden
Leader of the Conservative Group	Raymond F Craine
