= 1976 Liverpool City Council election =

1976 UK local government election

← 1975	6 May 1976	1978 →

34 seats were up for election (one third): one seat for each of the 33 wards, plus one by-elections, Woolton, East 50 seats needed for a majority

Elections to Liverpool City Council were held on 6 May 1976. One third of the council was up for election and John Hamilton of the Labour Party became Council Leader albeit with no overall control of the council.

After the election, the composition of the council was:

Party	Seats	±
Labour	40	-2
Liberal	40	-1
Conservative	19	+3

== Election result ==
Liverpool local election result 1976
Party	Seats	Gains	Losses	Net gain/loss	Seats %	Votes %	Votes	+/−
Labour	15	2	4	-2	44%	35%	46,253	+4%
Liberal	13	5	6	-1	38%	30%	40,231	-3%
Conservative	6	4	1	+3	18%	34%	45,401	0
Communist	0	0	0	0	0%	0.6%	801	
Independent Liberal	0	0	0	0	0%	0.17%	221	
National Party of UK	0	0	0	0	0%	0.11%	148	

== Ward results ==
* - Councillor seeking re-election

^{(PARTY)} - Party of former Councillor

These election results are compared with the 1973 election results which were all up elections, with all three Councillors being elected for each ward. Those Councillors elected with the second highest number of votes for each ward were elected for a three-year term, finishing in 1976.

=== Abercromby, St. James' ===
Abercromby, St. James'
Party	Candidate	Votes	%	±%
Labour	O. J. Doyle *	1,780	66%	+1%
Conservative	J. D. Jones	368	14%	+8%%
Communist	R. O'Hara	270	10%	−3%
Liberal	J. Newton	265	10%	0%
Majority		1,412		
Registered electors		13,145		
Turnout		2,683	20%	
Labour hold		Swing		

=== Aigburth ===
Aigburth
Party	Candidate	Votes	%	±%
Conservative	S. T. Moss	3,465	53%	+16%
Liberal	W. Russell Dyson ^{(PARTY)}	2,463	37%	−18%
Labour	T. Roberts	668	10%	+1%
Majority		1,002		
Registered electors		15,090		
Turnout		6,596	44%	
Conservative gain from Liberal		Swing		

=== Allerton ===
Allerton
Party	Candidate	Votes	%	±%
Conservative	R. F. Craine *	2,430	54%	+7%
Liberal	T. H. Harte	1,445	32%	−10%
Labour	T. McManus	596	13%	+1%
Majority		985		
Registered electors		10,754		
Turnout		4,471	42%	
Conservative hold		Swing		

=== Anfield ===
Anfield
Party	Candidate	Votes	%	±%
Labour	Keva. C. Coombes	1,692	37%	+5%
Conservative	T. P. Pink	1,686	37%	+13%
Liberal	J. Wilde *	1,189	26%	−18%
Majority		6		
Registered electors		12,799		
Turnout		4,567	36%	
Labour gain from Liberal		Swing		

=== Arundel ===
Arundel
Party	Candidate	Votes	%	±%
Liberal	William Charles Hutchinson *	1,781	44%	−16%
Labour	F. S. Roderick	1,088	27%	+6%
Conservative	R. M. Amyes	1,171	29%	−10%
Majority		610		
Registered electors		13,780		
Turnout		4,040	29%	
Liberal hold		Swing		

=== Breckfield, St. Domingo ===
Breckfield, St. Domingo
Party	Candidate	Votes	%	±%
Labour	J. Connolly	1,474	46%	+14%
Liberal	R. Clitherow ^{(PARTY)}	743	23%	−31%
Conservative	J. Butterfield	989	31%	+17%
Majority		485		
Registered electors		12,100		
Turnout		3,206	26%	
Labour gain from Liberal		Swing		

=== Broadgreen ===
Broadgreen
Party	Candidate	Votes	%	±%
Conservative	J. J. Swainbank	1,934	40%	+16%
Liberal	W. Smyth ^{(PARTY)}	1,866	38%	−24%
Labour	F. Dunne	1,049	22%	+8%
Majority		68		
Registered electors		12,264		
Turnout		4,849	40%	
Conservative gain from Liberal		Swing		

=== Central, Everton, Netherfield ===
Central, Everton, Netherfield
Party	Candidate	Votes	%	±%
Labour	J. E. Walker *	1,658	71%	+5%
Conservative	J. Crowe	390	17%	−2%
National Party of UK	A. J. Roberts	148	6%	
Liberal	G. Scattergood	135	6%	−9%
Majority		1,268		
Registered electors		11,970		
Turnout		2,331	19%	
Labour hold		Swing		

=== Childwall ===
Childwall
Party	Candidate	Votes	%	±%
Conservative	M. Kingston	3,753	50%	+12%
Liberal	P. H. Hodgson ^{(PARTY)}	2,342	31%	−19%
Labour	J. E. Roberts	1,443	19%	+8%
Majority		1,411		
Registered electors		20,587		
Turnout		7,538	37%	
Conservative gain from Liberal		Swing		

=== Church ===
Church
Party	Candidate	Votes	%	±%
Liberal	Len Tyrer ^{(PARTY)}	2,953	47%	−15%
Conservative	W. H. Stabback	2,652	42%	−10%
Labour	J. E. McPherson	711	11%	+5%
Majority		301		
Registered electors		15,221		
Turnout		6,316	41%	
Liberal hold		Swing		

=== Clubmoor ===
Clubmoor
Party	Candidate	Votes	%	±%
Liberal	Angela M. Warburton	1,504	38%	−7%
Labour	M. Stewart ^{(PARTY)}	1,387	35%	+2%
Conservative	S. Hicklin	1,042	26%	−4%
Majority		117		
Registered electors		10,607		
Turnout		3,933	37%	
Liberal gain from Labour		Swing		

=== County ===
County
Party	Candidate	Votes	%	±%
Liberal	Paul R. Clark	1,676	40%	+13%
Labour	E. T. Mooney *	1,363	32%	−12%
Conservative	W. Thomas	1,082	26%	+3%
Communist	B. Anderson	76	2%	
Majority		313		
Registered electors		12,171		
Turnout		4,197	34%	
Liberal gain from Labour		Swing		

=== Croxteth ===
Croxteth
Party	Candidate	Votes	%	±%
Conservative	G. E. Brandwood	2,391	45%	+15%
Liberal	T. Blyde ^{(PARTY)}	1,992	38%	−20%
Labour	H. Rimmer	905	17%	+5%
Majority		399		
Registered electors		12,487		
Turnout		5,288	42%	
Conservative gain from Liberal		Swing		

=== Dingle ===
Dingle
Party	Candidate	Votes	%	±%
Labour	R. Stoddart ^{(PARTY)}	1,237	57%	−1%
Conservative	J. M. Shaw	478	22%	+6%
Liberal	Graham Hulme	372	17%	+2%
Communist	J. Cook	78	4%	−2%
Majority		759		
Registered electors		7,228		
Turnout		2,165	30%	
Labour hold		Swing		

=== Dovecot ===
Dovecot
Party	Candidate	Votes	%	±%
Labour	W. P. Johnson *	2,234	52%	
Conservative	D. P. Dougherty	1,430	33%	
Liberal	E. Barber	606	14%	
Majority		804		
Registered electors		16,293		
Turnout		4,270	26%	
Labour hold		Swing		

=== Fairfield ===
Fairfield
Party	Candidate	Votes	%	±%
Liberal	Richard Pine ^{(PARTY)}	1,518	45%	
Labour	S. F. Jacobs	1,132	33%	
Conservative	W. McGuirk	732	22%	
Majority		386		
Registered electors		10,350		
Turnout		3,382	33%	
Liberal hold		Swing		

=== Fazakerley ===
Fazakerley
Party	Candidate	Votes	%	±%
Liberal	Harold Glyn Rogers	1,532	37%	
Labour	F. Gaier ^{(PARTY)}	1,343	32%	−25%
Conservative	A. Brown	1,305	31%	−12%
Majority		189		
Registered electors		11,774		
Turnout		4,180	36%	
Liberal gain from Labour		Swing		

=== Gillmoss ===
Gillmoss
Party	Candidate	Votes	%	±%
Labour	W. R. Snell ^{(PARTY)}	2,309	58%	−11%
Liberal	John George Morgan	703	18%	
Conservative	B. Dougherty	959	24%	+1%
Majority		1,350		
Registered electors		19,607		
Turnout		3,971	20%	
Labour hold		Swing		

=== Granby, Prince's Park ===
Granby, Prince's Park
Party	Candidate	Votes	%	±%
Labour	J. D. Hamilton ^{(PARTY)}	1,811	53%	−13%
Conservative	G. Hughes	845	25%	−2%
Liberal	J. Rossington	649	19%	
Communist	A. McClelland	103	3%	−4%
Majority		966		
Registered electors		13,831		
Turnout		3,408	25%	
Labour hold		Swing		

=== Kensington ===
Kensington
Party	Candidate	Votes	%	±%
Liberal	Geoffrey B. Smith ^{(PARTY)}	991	43%	
Labour	J. H. Stamper	927	40%	
Conservative	I. Power	394	17%	
Majority		64		
Registered electors		7,472		
Turnout		2,312	31%	
Liberal hold		Swing		

=== Low Hill, Smithdown ===
Low Hill, Smithdown
Party	Candidate	Votes	%	±%
Liberal	Joanna Copsey ^{(PARTY)}	1,474	53%	−17%
Labour	L. P. Gallagher	1,109	40%	+16%
Conservative	K. M. Mountford	201	7%	+1%
Majority		365		
Registered electors		8,783		
Turnout		2,784	32%	
Liberal hold		Swing		

=== Melrose, Westminster ===
Melrose, Westminster
Party	Candidate	Votes	%	±%
Labour	J. Gardner *	1,390	72%	+9%
Conservative	W. Gilbody	436	22%	−1%
Liberal	B. Mowatt	114	6%	−7%
Majority		954		
Registered electors		8,017		
Turnout		1,940	24%	
Labour hold		Swing		

=== Old Swan ===
Old Swan
Party	Candidate	Votes	%	±%
Liberal	Peter Mahon	1,834	38%	
Labour	I. Jervis	1,294	27%	
Conservative	N. F. Derrick	1,511	31%	
Majority		323		
Registered electors		13,066		
Turnout		4,860	37%	
Liberal hold		Swing		

=== Picton ===
Picton
Party	Candidate	Votes	%	±%
Liberal	Gillian Loughney ^{(PARTY)}	1,899	43%	
Labour	F. Burke	1,525	34%	
Conservative	J. McDermott	926	21%	
Majority		374		
Registered electors		11,574		
Turnout		4,433	38%	
Liberal gain from Labour		Swing		

=== Pirrie ===
Pirrie
Party	Candidate	Votes	%	±%
Labour	M. Black *	2,628	55%	−12%
Conservative	I. Brown	1,599	33%	0%
Liberal	N. T Cardwell	570	12%	
Majority		1,029		
Registered electors		15,572		
Turnout		4,797	31%	
Labour hold		Swing		

=== St. Mary's ===
St. Mary's
Party	Candidate	Votes	%	±%
Labour	G. T. Walsh *	1,638	50%	
Conservative	D. W. Baskett	1,129	35%	
Liberal	C. Lister	400	12%	
Communist	J. M. McQueen	89	3%	
Majority		509		
Registered electors		9,801		
Turnout		3,256	33%	
Labour hold		Swing		

=== St. Michael's ===
St. Michael's
Party	Candidate	Votes	%	±%
Liberal	Michael O'Kane *	1,511	43%	
Conservative	R. S. Jones	1,286	37%	
Labour	B. Shelley	686	20%	
Majority		225		
Registered electors		9,920		
Turnout		3,483	35%	
Liberal hold		Swing		

=== Sandhills, Vauxhall ===
Sandhills, Vauxhall
Party	Candidate	Votes	%	±%
Labour	A. Dunford *	1,400	81%	
Liberal	M. A. Decker	184	11%	
Conservative	S. V. Hennessy	142	8%	
Majority		1,216		
Registered electors		9,985		
Turnout		1,726	17%	
Labour hold		Swing		

=== Speke ===
Speke
Party	Candidate	Votes	%	±%
Labour	K. Stewart *	2,270	65%	
Conservative	E. M. Clein	954	27%	
Liberal	C. H. Stocker	291	8%	
Majority		1,316		
Registered electors		14,320		
Turnout		3,515	25%	
Labour hold		Swing		

=== Tuebrook ===
Tuebrook
Party	Candidate	Votes	%	±%
Liberal	Paul V. Downes ^{(PARTY)}	1,477	38%	−5%
Labour	C. O'Rourke ^{(PARTY)}	1,161	30%	0%
Conservative	O. D. Jennings	1,099	29%	+5%
Communist	P. B. Bissette	102	3%	0%
Majority		316		
Registered electors		11,410		
Turnout		3,839	34%	
Liberal hold		Swing		

=== Warbreck ===
Warbreck
Party	Candidate	Votes	%	±%
Liberal	Carol McNeilly	1,797	41%	
Labour	P. Rowlands	1,179	27%	−20%
Conservative	J. H. Brash *	1,431	32%	−21%
Majority		366		
Registered electors		11,966		
Turnout		4,407	37%	
Liberal gain from Conservative		Swing		

=== Woolton, East ===
Woolton, East 2 seats
Party	Candidate	Votes	%	±%
Labour	M. R. Delaney	2,158	62%	
Labour	H. Bryers	2,022	58%	
Conservative	J. McKenzie	820	24%	
Conservative	J. B. King	802	23%	
Liberal	R. F. Heywood	488	14%	
Liberal	C. O'Connor	384	11%	
Majority		1,338		
Registered electors		13,362		
Turnout		3,446	26%	
Labour hold		Swing		

=== Woolton, West ===
Woolton, West
Party	Candidate	Votes	%	±%
Conservative	A. McVeigh *	4,380	63%	
Labour	J. V. Walsh	1,076	15%	
Liberal	A. Smallman	1,519	22%	
Majority		2,861		
Registered electors		17,845		
Turnout		6,975	39%	
Conservative hold		Swing		
