= Derek Hatton =

British politician (born 1948)

Derek Anthony Hatton

Deputy Leader of Liverpool City Council
- In office 1983–1986
- Leader: John Hamilton

Personal details
- Born: 17 January 1948 (age 78)
- Party: Labour (before 1986, 2019)
- Other political affiliations: Militant tendency
- Education: Liverpool Institute for Boys

Derek Anthony Hatton (born 17 January 1948) is a British former politician, later a broadcaster, property developer and businessman. He gained national prominence as deputy leader of Liverpool City Council in the 1980s and was a member of the Trotskyist Militant group.

== Early life ==
Hatton attended the Liverpool Institute for Boys from 1959 to 1964. Notable names at the school included Paul McCartney, George Harrison, Peter Sissons, Bill Kenwright and Steven Norris. His subsequent academic success was limited, but he enjoyed sport and appeared on stage as Gratiano in a school production of The Merchant of Venice with future theatre producer Bill Kenwright.

== Political career ==
Hatton became a fireman and later joined the Labour Party and Militant, a Trotskyist organisation then following an entryist strategy within the Labour Party. As deputy leader of Liverpool City Council from 1983, Hatton was the most vocal and prominent member of the council's leadership, led by then Leader of the Council John Hamilton.

Hatton joined the rate-capping rebellion in 1985 as the council refused to make a rate increase. In June, the council changed tactics and set an illegal "deficit budget" which committed it to spending £30 million more than its income, claiming that the excess represented grant "stolen" by central government. Once adopted by the Liverpool District Labour Party and 49 councillors, this policy catapulted Hatton and the city council into massive media attention and conflict with the then Conservative government. In 1986, Hatton and 46 other councillors were subsequently found to have committed wilful misconduct by the district auditor, ordered to repay the costs incurred by the council due to the failure to set a rate as a surcharge, and disqualified from office.

Hatton was expelled from the Labour Party in 1986 for belonging to Militant, which had earlier been found to be in breach of the Labour Party's constitution. Hatton argued that Militant was a legitimate Marxist tendency within the Labour Party, but the National Executive Committee voted to expel him by twelve votes to six.

In 1993, Hatton was accused of corruption as deputy leader of Liverpool City Council. After a lengthy trial, at Mold Crown Court, he was found not guilty.

Hatton, along with others, believes that he was the inspiration behind the character of Michael Murray in the G.B.H. series aired by Channel 4.

== Media career ==
Hatton presented the lunchtime phone-in on 105.4 Century FM when it launched in 1998, titled "The Degsy Debate". The BBC Two fly-on-the-wall documentary Trouble at the Top followed the station's launch, and Hatton's training. In the 1990s, he worked as Talk Radio's morning phone-in presenter. He was the subject of a BBC documentary, My Brilliant Career in 1996.

In the 1990s, Hatton starred in a series of adverts for Sekonda watches. He also appeared on an episode of BBC panel show Have I Got News for You in 1993, alongside Conservative MP and panellist Edwina Currie, also a Liverpudlian.

In 2010, Hatton appeared in Channel 4's Alternative Election Night Special episode of Come Dine with Me alongside Brian Paddick, Edwina Currie and Rod Liddle.

Hatton was a director of Rippleffect Studios Limited from 1999 to 2008.

== Rejoining the Labour Party ==
It was reported in the Liverpool Daily Post in 2007 that Hatton had rejoined the Labour Party and intended to seek selection as a prospective parliamentary candidate in the North West. Hatton made clear that he is no longer a Trotskyist, but maintains that he remains firmly on the left of the party, expressing his belief that Labour has to abandon New Labour ideology (or "neo-Tory", as Hatton puts it) and return to its traditional values.

In October 2008, during an interview with The Sunday Telegraph, Hatton revealed that he had become a capitalist running a property company in Cyprus and driving a £60,000 Range Rover, justifying his change in attitude as "My days in politics were a very long time ago and I lost interest in it after I was expelled from the city council". Hatton gave another interview in the same year to the Liverpool Daily Post in which he reasserted his intention to seek selection as a parliamentary Labour candidate for a constituency in Liverpool or elsewhere in the North West at some point in the future. Hatton stated that he may challenge "one of the neo-Tory types currently representing Liverpool, like Maria Eagle maybe".

=== 2015 rejected application ===
On 28 May 2015, it emerged that Hatton had attempted to rejoin the Labour Party on 9 May, two days after Labour's defeat in the 2015 general election. His application was rejected by Iain McNicol, the party's general secretary.

In September 2015, Hatton endorsed Jeremy Corbyn's campaign in the Labour Party leadership election. He wrote: "For the first time since the Eighties we have a clear choice between a Tory party supported by big business, and a Labour party based on the trade unions. This might sound very old fashioned, but it's simply a return to the obvious split that has always existed. It was artificially camouflaged under New Labour. It's an exciting time for the whole country, but I fear that the pressure which will be brought to bear from the 'New Labour dinosaurs' and from much of the media will be massive, and Jeremy Corbyn will need strength and support in abundance in order to resist it."

In a BBC Newsnight broadcast on 27 July 2015 Hatton claimed not to be a property developer, and that he was a card-carrying member of the Labour Party. He supported the campaign of Jeremy Corbyn to lead the Labour Party. However, the Labour Party denied this, insisting instead that Hatton had been sent a membership card automatically but had not been permitted to join.

At the end of January 2017, in an article for the Liverpool Echo, Hatton wrote that he had voted against Britain leaving the European Union in the membership referendum in June 2016: "I can't believe Corbyn is arguing for Labour MPs to vote with the most reactionary and xenophobic Tory government we've seen for a long time. This shows a real lack of leadership on his part and does now make me have serious doubts about him".

=== 2018 overturned successful application ===
Hatton applied to rejoin Labour in September 2018. The application was approved in February 2019. He was suspended from the party on 20 February, just days after he was re-admitted, after an allegedly anti-Semitic tweet from 2012 came to light. The tweet in question read, "Jewish people with any sense of humanity need to start speaking out publicly against the ruthless murdering being carried out by Israel!"

== 2020 corruption allegations ==
In December 2020, newspapers reported that Hatton was one of five men, including the Mayor of Liverpool, Joe Anderson, arrested as part of an investigation into building and development contracts in Liverpool. In March 2025 the BBC reported that Hatton had been charged with "one count of bribery and one count of counsel or procure[sic] misconduct in a public office".

== Bibliography ==
- Hatton, Derek (31 July 2017). "'I now have serious doubts about Jeremy Corbyn'". Liverpool Echo.
- Hatton, Derek (27 September 2018). "Why I'm back in the Labour Party after 33 years". Liverpool Echo. "Corbyn's changed everything and I'll fight to get him to No. 10"
