= 1975 Liverpool City Council election =

1975 UK local government election

← 1973	1 May 1975	1976 →

34 seats were up for election (one third): one seat for each of the 33 wards, plus one by-election in Childwall. 50 seats needed for a majority

Elections to Liverpool City Council were held on 1 May 1975. One third of the council was up for election. The terms of office of the Councillors elected in 1973 with the third highest number of votes in each ward, expired and so these election results were compared with the 1973 results. Bill Smyth of the Liberal Party became the Leader of the Council albeit with no overall control.

After the election, the composition of the council was:

Party	Seats	±
Labour	42	-1
Liberal	44	-3
Conservative	13	+4

== Election result ==
Liverpool local election result 1975
Party	Seats	Gains	Losses	Net gain/loss	Seats %	Votes %	Votes	+/−
Labour	13	1	2	-1	38%	31%	36,415	
Conservative	8	6	2	+4	24%	34%	39,841	
Liberal	13	2	5	-3	38%	33%	38,480	
Communist	0	0	0	0	0%	0.6%	712	
Old Swan Residents' Association	0	0	0	0	0%	0.3%	338	
Independent Liberal	0	0	0	0	0%	0.09%	105	
National Front	0	0	0	0	0%	0.08%	91	
British Movement	0	0	0	0	0%	0.06%	69	

== Ward results ==
=== Abercromby, St. James ===
Abercromby, St. James
Party	Candidate	Votes	%	±%
Labour	Violet McCoy *	469	62%	▼3%
Liberal	J. P. Murphy	233	10%	Steady
Conservative	C. McMichael	416	18%	▲12%
Communist	R. O'Hara	250	11%	▼2%
Majority		1,044		
Registered electors		12,886		
Turnout		2,359	18%	
Labour hold		Swing		

=== Aigburth ===
Aigburth
Party	Candidate	Votes	%	±%
Conservative	J. H. Lea	3,037	50%	+13%
Liberal	Len Tyrer *	2,567	42%	−13%
Labour	L. P. Gallagher	492	8%	−1%
Majority		470		
Registered electors		14,502		
Turnout		6,096	42%	
Conservative gain from Liberal		Swing		

=== Allerton ===
Allerton
Party	Candidate	Votes	%	±%
Conservative	J. S. Ross *	2,217	57%	+10%
Liberal	T. H. Harte	1,190	30%	−12%
Labour	T. Bailey	505	13%	
Majority		1,027		
Registered electors		10,801		
Turnout		3,912	36%	
Conservative hold		Swing		

=== Anfield ===
Anfield
Party	Candidate	Votes	%	±%
Conservative	M. Fitzsimmons	1,453	39%	▲15%
Liberal	R. Donnelly *	1,215	32%	▼12%
Labour	L. Caplan	1,102	29%	▼3%
Majority		238		
Registered electors		12,828		
Turnout		3,770	29%	
Conservative gain from Liberal		Swing		

=== Arundel ===
Arundel
Party	Candidate	Votes	%	±%
Liberal	Kenneth L. Rainford	1,700	47%	
Conservative	R. M. Amyes	1,030	28%	
Labour	F. S. Roderick	901	25%	
Majority		670		
Registered electors		14,119		
Turnout		3,631	26%	
Liberal hold		Swing		

=== Breckfield, St. Domingo ===
Breckfield, St. Domingo
Party	Candidate	Votes	%	±%
Liberal	Frank McNevin *	1,123	42%	
Labour	J. Connolly	954	36%	
Conservative	R. S. Charles	568	21%	
Majority		169		
Registered electors		11,053		
Turnout		2,645	24%	
Liberal hold		Swing		

=== Broadgreen ===
Broadgreen
Party	Candidate	Votes	%	±%
Liberal	Rosemary Cooper *	1,969	46%	−16%
Conservative	J. J. Swainbank	1,609	38%	+14%
Labour	W. F. Williams	709	17%	+3%
Majority		360		
Registered electors		12,187		
Turnout		4,287	35%	
Liberal hold		Swing		

=== Central, Everton, Netherfield ===
Central, Everton, Netherfield
Party	Candidate	Votes	%	±%
Labour	J. Finnegan *	1,379	66%	0%
Conservative	A. Brown	569	27%	+8%
Liberal	P. Seddon	135	6%	−9%
Majority		810		
Registered electors		12,485		
Turnout		2,083	17%	
Labour hold		Swing		

=== Childwall ===
Childwall 2 seats
Party	Candidate	Votes	%	±%
Conservative	W. A. Fearenside	3,377	49%	+11%
Conservative	S. Airey	3,268	48%	+10%
Liberal	Anne Bailey ^{(PARTY)}	2,429	35%	−15%
Liberal	P. H. Hodgson	2,416	35%	−15%
Labour	Kathleen Jones	1,040	15%	+4%
Labour	P. Rowlands	954	14%	+3%
Majority		948		
Registered electors		20,184		
Turnout		6,846	34%	
Conservative gain from Labour		Swing		

=== Church ===
Church
Party	Candidate	Votes	%	±%
Liberal	Bernard J. Flynn ^{(PARTY)}	2,808	50%	−12%
Conservative	W. H. Stabback	2,336	42%	+10%
Labour	F. Dunne	480	9%	+4%
Majority		472		
Registered electors		15,015		
Turnout		5,624	37%	
Liberal hold		Swing		

=== Clubmoor ===
Clubmoor
Party	Candidate	Votes	%	±%
Liberal	Michael J. Storey *	1,627	44%	−1%
Labour	Margaret Stewart	1,215	33%	0%
Conservative	S. Hicklin	830	23%	+1%
Majority		412		
Registered electors		10,609		
Turnout		3,672	35%	
Liberal hold		Swing		

=== County ===
County
Party	Candidate	Votes	%	±%
Conservative	H. Brown	1,147	36%	+7%
Labour	F.P. Hughes *	1,068	33%	−11%
Liberal	M.J. Booth	923	29%	+2%
National Front	E. Herbert	91	3%	
Majority		79		
Registered electors		12,207		
Turnout		3,229	26%	
Conservative gain from Labour		Swing		

=== Croxteth ===
Croxteth
Party	Candidate	Votes	%	±%
Liberal	Ivan Clews ^{(PARTY)}	2,072	42%	−16%
Conservative	G. E. Brandwood	2,058	42%	+12%
Labour	Lulu Caplan	751	15%	+3%
Majority		14		
Registered electors		12,486		
Turnout		4,881	39%	
Liberal hold		Swing		

=== Dingle ===
Dingle
Party	Candidate	Votes	%	±%
Labour	S. W. Jones *	895	55%	−9%
Conservative	J. B. King	493	30%	+14%
Liberal	W. H. Mellor	163	10%	−5%
Communist	J. Cook	66	4%	0%
Majority		402		
Registered electors		7,138		
Turnout		1,617	23%	
Labour hold		Swing		

=== Dovecot ===
Dovecot
Party	Candidate	Votes	%	±%
Labour	W. H. Westbury *	2,121	50%	
Liberal	Eileen Barber	1,074	25%	
Conservative	D. P. Dougherty	1,041	25%	
Majority		1,047		
Registered electors		16,230		
Turnout		4,236	26%	
Labour hold		Swing		

=== Fairfield ===
Fairfield
Party	Candidate	Votes	%	±%
Labour	H. Livermore	1,106	40%	
Liberal	H. Christian ^{(PARTY)}	927	33%	
Conservative	W. McGuirk	765	27%	
Majority		179		
Registered electors		10,302		
Turnout		2,798	27%	
Labour gain from Liberal		Swing		

=== Fazakerley ===
Fazakerley
Party	Candidate	Votes	%	±%
Conservative	Ron Gould	1,398	38%	−5%
Labour	H. James *	1,142	31%	−26%
Liberal	Harold Glyn Rogers	1,121	31%	
Majority		256		
Registered electors		11,785		
Turnout		3,661	31%	
Conservative gain from Labour		Swing		

=== Gillmoss ===
Gillmoss
Party	Candidate	Votes	%	±%
Labour	J. J. Cruikshank *	1,618	58%	−11%
Conservative	C. Williams	665	24%	−1%
Liberal	C. H. Stocker	500	18%	
Majority		953		
Registered electors		19,586		
Turnout		2,783	14%	
Labour hold		Swing		

=== Granby, Prince's Park ===
Granby, Prince's Park
Party	Candidate	Votes	%	±%
Labour	A. Doswell *	1,575	56%	−10%
Conservative	E. J. D. Williams	867	31%	+4%
Liberal	G. Scattergood	308	11%	
Communist	A. McClelland	85	3%	−4%
Majority		708		
Registered electors		14,105		
Turnout		2,835	20%	
Labour hold		Swing		

=== Kensington ===
Kensington
Party	Candidate	Votes	%	±%
Liberal	Frank Doran *	1,160	49%	
Labour	T. F. Money	779	33%	
Conservative	Irene Power	406	17%	
Majority		381		
Registered electors		8,490		
Turnout		2,345	28%	
Liberal hold		Swing		

=== Low Hill, Smithdown ===
Low Hill, Smithdown
Party	Candidate	Votes	%	±%
Liberal	Ernest Richard Stephenson *	1,461	61%	−9%
Labour	C. H. Winter	725	30%	+6%
Conservative	J. A. Gunn	194	8%	+2%
Majority		736		
Registered electors		9,368		
Turnout		2,380	25%	
Liberal hold		Swing		

=== Melrose, Westminster ===
Melrose, Westminster
Party	Candidate	Votes	%	±%
Labour	W. Lafferty *	1,074	64%	+1%
Liberal	M. J. Lynch	133	8%	−5%
Conservative	W. Gilbody	463	28%	+5%
Majority		611		
Registered electors		9,018		
Turnout		1,670	19%	
Labour hold		Swing		

=== Old Swan ===
Old Swan
Party	Candidate	Votes	%	±%
Liberal	Willian M. Galbraith *	1,730	40%	
Conservative	N. F. Derrick	1,353	31%	
Labour	T. McManus	844	19%	
Independent Liberal	W. J. McCullough	105	2%	
Old Swan Residents' Association	A. R. Dronfield	338	8%	
Majority		377		
Registered electors		13,108		
Turnout		4,370	33%	
Liberal hold		Swing		

=== Picton ===
Picton
Party	Candidate	Votes	%	±%
Liberal	Herbert Edward Herrity *	1,990	49%	
Labour	A. Fletcher	1,282	32%	
Conservative	J. McDermott	726	18%	
Communist	J. Volleamere	65	2%	
Majority		708		
Registered electors		11,505		
Turnout		4,063	35%	
Liberal hold		Swing		

=== Pirrie ===
Pirrie
Party	Candidate	Votes	%	±%
Labour	P. Owens *	1,884	50%	67%
Liberal	Carol McNeilly	668	18%	
Conservative	I. Brown	1,235	33%	
Majority		649		
Registered electors		15,539		
Turnout		3,787	24%	
Labour hold		Swing		

=== St. Mary's ===
St. Mary's
Party	Candidate	Votes	%	±%
Labour	R. C. Evans *	1,302	47%	
Liberal	C. Litster	542	20%	
Conservative	D. W. Baskett	910	33%	
Majority		392		
Registered electors		9,820		
Turnout		2,754	28%	
Labour hold		Swing		

=== St. Michael's ===
St. Michael's
Party	Candidate	Votes	%	±%
Liberal	Richard Kemp	1,257	40%	
Conservative	S. T. Moss ^{(PARTY)}	1,206	39%	
Labour	J. Hughes	658	21%	
Majority		51		
Registered electors		9,892		
Turnout		3,121	32%	
Liberal gain from Conservative		Swing		

=== Sandhills, Vauxhall ===
Sandhills, Vauxhall
Party	Candidate	Votes	%	±%
Labour	J. Morgan *	1,403	84%	
Liberal	G. Weatherall	90	5%	
Conservative	P. K. Mostyn	177	11%	
Majority		1,226		
Registered electors		10,052		
Turnout		1,670	17%	
Labour hold		Swing		

=== Speke ===
Speke
Party	Candidate	Votes	%	±%
Labour	R. Short ^{(PARTY)}	1,345	48%	
Conservative	C. W. Harpin	710	25%	
Independent Labour	P. Moorhead	498	18%	
Liberal	M. D. Piercy	265	9%	
Majority		635		
Registered electors		14,497		
Turnout		2,818	19%	
Labour hold		Swing		

=== Tuebrook ===
Tuebrook
Party	Candidate	Votes	%	±%
Liberal	Robert Gore ^{(PARTY)}	1,412	40%	−3%
Labour	Christine O'Rourke	1,131	32%	+2%
Conservative	C. E. Jennings	939	27%	+3%
Communist	J. Jackson	57	2%	−1%
Majority		281		
Registered electors		11,423		
Turnout		3,539	31%	
Liberal hold		Swing		

=== Warbreck ===
Warbreck
Party	Candidate	Votes	%	±%
Liberal	Joseph Lang	1,592	43%	
Conservative	D. J. Jones	1,223	33%	−20%
Labour	Ellen Kelly	861	23%	−24%
British Movement	P. T. Tidy	69	2%	
Majority		369		
Registered electors		12,023		
Turnout		3,745	31%	
Liberal gain from Conservative		Swing		

=== Woolton, East ===
Woolton, East
Party	Candidate	Votes	%	±%
Labour	W. J. Wright *	1,741	53%	
Conservative	Helen Rigby	698	21%	
Liberal	Francis Richard Haywood	635	19%	
Communist	A. Lowe	189	6%	
Majority		1,043		
Registered electors		13,064		
Turnout		3,263	25%	
Labour hold		Swing		

=== Woolton, West ===
Woolton, West
Party	Candidate	Votes	%	±%
Conservative	C. J. Hallows *	3,779	61%	
Liberal	M. Pistotnik-Howard	1,467	24%	
Labour	J. P. McCormack	916	15%	
Majority		2,312		
Registered electors		17,834		
Turnout		8,162	35%	
Conservative hold		Swing		
