= Rate-capping rebellion =

1985 English local council political campaign

Map showing councils involved in the rebellion. Councils beginning the financial year with no rate Councils joining the protest but backing down Capped councils not involved in rebellion Council not involved

The rate-capping rebellion was a campaign within English local councils in 1985 which aimed to force the Conservative government of Margaret Thatcher to withdraw powers to restrict the spending of councils. The affected councils were almost all run by left-wing Labour Party leaderships. The campaign's tactic was that councils whose budgets were restricted would refuse to set any budget at all for the financial year 1985–86, requiring the government to intervene directly in providing local services, or to concede. However, all fifteen councils which initially refused to set a rate eventually did so, and the campaign failed to change government policy. Powers to restrict council budgets have remained in place ever since.

Rising local government spending had long been a concern of central government, but direct powers to limit individual council budgets were controversial and some Conservative Party members opposed them. While the measure was passing through Parliament, internal dissent within Liverpool City Council led to prolonged delay in budgeting which only ended when government grants were increased. Believing Liverpool to have forced a concession, left-wing Labour council leaders decided to emulate their approach, despite warnings by Liverpool that success was unlikely. Refusing to set a budget was illegal and the campaign was divisive: it did not unify the left wing of the Labour Party in its support and the party leadership made clear its lack of support.

Eight councils ended their campaign when the leadership proposed a legal budget, six when councillors from the majority group joined opposition councillors to overrule the leadership; Lewisham conceded in unique circumstances. Two councils, Lambeth and Liverpool held out for longer than others and were subjected to an extraordinary audit which resulted in the councillors responsible for not setting a budget being required to repay the amount the council lost in interest, and also being disqualified from office. Liverpool's delay in setting a budget caused a severe financial crisis which was denounced by the Labour Party leader Neil Kinnock.

== Background ==
=== Rates ===
Until 1989 in Scotland and 1990 in England and Wales, local councils raised their own revenue through a tax known as rates. Every property, whether residential or commercial, was given a rateable value which estimated the annual rent it would bring in. In the budgeting process the council would work out the total amount it needed to raise locally, and then divide it by the total rateable value within its boundaries to produce the proportion of the rateable value that each householder or business would have to pay. This proportion was known as 'the rate' for the year and the process was therefore known as 'setting a rate'.

Where there were two levels of local government, one of them (the lower tier) was designated as the principal local authority, with the higher tier authority setting its rate in the form of a precept which was added to the rate levels set by the lower tier authorities it covered. The lower tier was responsible for collecting the whole amount and then passing on the proceeds of the precept to the authority which had set it.

=== Targets and grant penalties ===
The Conservative Party came to power in 1979 committed to reducing public spending, and reducing spending by local authorities was part of this desire from the start. As early as November 1979 the Environment Secretary Michael Heseltine announced his intention to take powers to curb overspending local authorities. From the financial year 1980–81, councils which were deemed to be overspending had their central government grants reduced; in 1981–82, a system known as 'targets and penalties' was introduced.

However, the election of many more Labour councillors and Labour councils in local elections in 1981 and 1982, many of whom were associated with the left-wing, meant that more councils were explicitly committed to increasing public spending. Local government spending started to rise again in 1982–83. As councils found their grants from central government cut, their response was not to cut their budgets, but to increase the rates even further to compensate. Pressure within the Government, especially from the Treasury and Chief Secretary Leon Brittan was applied to the Department of the Environment to take more effective action. On 16 July 1982 Brittan told the conference of the Society of Local Authority Chief Executives that continued overspending was "bound to cause central government to intervene ever more obtrusively and seek ever greater powers over local authority finances".

=== Cabinet committee ===
In June 1982, a Cabinet committee had been set up to look at local government finance, on which Brittan sat. At this committee the idea of central government taking powers to limit rates was first developed; however it proved very unpopular with most Ministers on the committee: Michael Heseltine and his deputy Tom King thought it would be too complicated and possibly unconstitutional, and the Attorney General Sir Michael Havers had to give advice. When the committee reported to Cabinet on 17 January 1983 against rate limitation, Margaret Thatcher rejected its report and instructed Tom King (who had since been promoted to Environment Secretary) to come up with a foolproof system.

=== Rate limitation proposed ===
King put Terry Heiser, a civil servant then Deputy Secretary in charge of the Finance and Local Government at the Department of the Environment, in charge of developing the policy; Heiser produced two schemes known as 'selective' and 'general' rate limitation which were approved at a Cabinet meeting on 12 May – three days after Thatcher had called a general election. The Conservative Party manifesto declared:

There are .. a number of grossly extravagant Labour authorities whose exorbitant rate demands have caused great distress both to business and domestic ratepayers. We shall legislate to curb excessive and irresponsible rate increases by high-spending councils, and to provide a general scheme for limitation of rate increases for all local authorities to be used if necessary.

The Conservatives' victory in the election was followed on 1 August 1983 by a white paper which put more details on the proposal. It stated that authorities would be selected on the basis of several factors, not only the absolute level of spending in comparison with the 'Grant Related Expenditure' (the notional level set by the Government needed to provide a standard level of service):

But other factors may also be taken into consideration, such as recent trends in an authority's expenditure compared with that of other comparable authorities; its overall performance against any expenditure guidance which may have been given to authorities by the Secretary of State; its manpower levels; and the level of its rates.

Identifying the local authorities which were spending significantly more than they received in grants and more than the government's targets, all were controlled by the Labour Party except for the City of London Corporation. The Government announced that it would aim to pass legislation in 1984, and then select a small number of councils to have their rates capped in 1985–86. The proposal to cap rates was controversial and many in local government were concerned where it would lead to; in particular the Audit Commission, responsible for overseeing local government spending, was concerned that it might be drawn into a political fight, casting doubt on its independence.

=== Parliamentary passage of the Rates Bill ===
On 20 December the Rates Bill was published, with the new Environment Secretary Patrick Jenkin making it clear he would resign if he could not get it enacted. It was anticipated that the Bill would be highly controversial especially with members of the House of Lords and Jenkin was said to have reminded them of the Salisbury Convention which prevented the Lords from rejecting any Bill mentioned in an election manifesto. The Bill was soon under criticism in Parliament by Conservative MPs Geoffrey Rippon and Anthony Beaumont-Dark, and outside it by David Howell.

When the Bill was debated on 17 January 1984, the opposition was led by former Prime Minister Edward Heath who attacked the centralisation of power; Heath led a total of 24 Conservative MPs in voting against the Bill, while 11 more abstained including Francis Pym. With opposition MPs debating the Bill in detail, the Government was forced to move a guillotine motion on 29 February, which was passed despite some Conservative protests. After making a minor concession exempting smaller councils from selective capping, the Bill went to the Lords where the Labour opposition moved an amendment asserting that it would "gravely weaken local democracy" and rejecting the Bill. The amendment was lost by 235 to 153, the Government regarding it as an issue of confidence which justified them summoning many Peers who rarely attended.

The main clause giving the Government power to cap rates was supported by the Lords with a majority of 10 votes despite some Conservative abstentions, and after some more concessions the Government saw the Bill through the Lords without a defeat. The Rates Act 1984 received Royal Assent on 26 June.

=== Liverpool budget-setting in 1984 ===
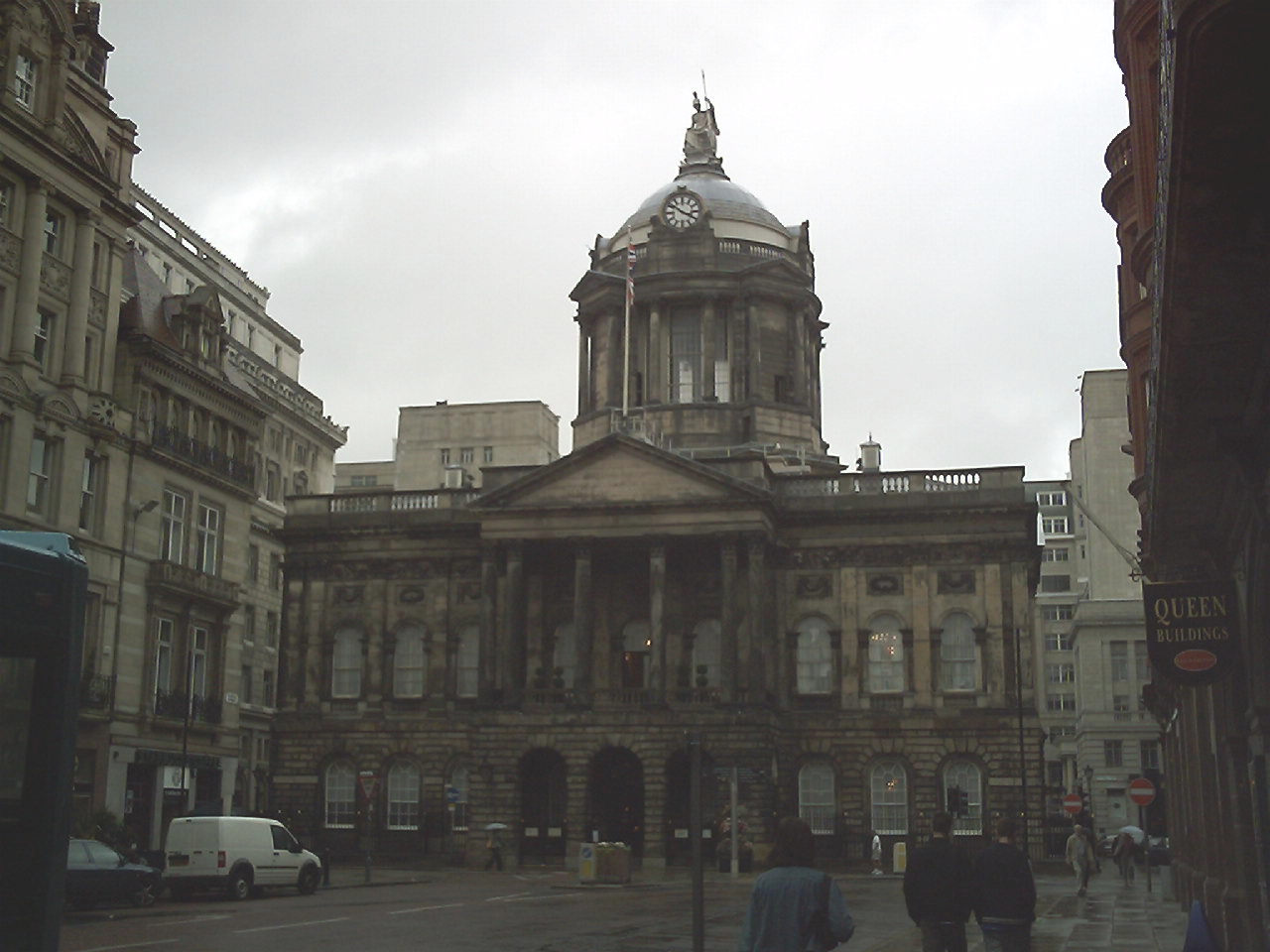
Liverpool Town Hall, headquarters of the city council and focus for some of the public campaigns it led over government grants.

When the Labour Party won control of Liverpool City Council in the local elections of May 1983, the council leadership was under the effective control of the Militant tendency, a group which had a majority of the active members of the Liverpool District Labour Party which directed the activities of the council group. The new leadership inherited a budget set by the Liberal Party administration which preceded them, which it considered was insufficient to meet their commitments to the electorate to the tune of £25m. The council, under Militant's guidance, began in Summer 1983 a political fight to win more resources from the government.

With no alteration in the government's stance, there was already talk of the council adopting illegal tactics in its 1984 budgeting, and on 19 March the District Auditor Les Stanford wrote to every councillor warning that the consequences of not setting a legal rate was a budget crisis, with surcharge and disqualification for councillors. A group of six Labour councillors under the leadership of Eddie Roderick declared they would not approve an illegal budget, but the majority of the Labour group thought the letter was a tactic to scare them into backing down. The council leadership put forward an illegal budget on 29 March; after an eight-hour meeting, Roderick put forward an amendment to delay setting a budget until 11 April to let officers prepare a legal one. A suggestion that council leader John Hamilton and chair of Finance Tony Byrne form an emergency committee to control finances in the interim was accepted but the delaying amendment fell: it had the support of the Conservatives and six councillors in Roderick's group but the Liberal councillors opposed it and supporters of the council leadership abstained. Instead the six Labour rebels, 30 Liberals and 18 Conservatives voted to postpone consideration.

A further budgeting meeting on 25 April saw the illegal budget again presented but owing to the opposition of the Roderick group it was defeated; the Conservative and Liberal groups could not agree on an alternative and the matter was allowed to drop; among the council leadership it was decided to delay setting a rate until after the results of local elections to one third of the council. In the event Labour gained seven seats, which gave a majority even if the Roderick Group opposed. A further council meeting was set for 15 May, but on 9 May Patrick Jenkin announced that he would be going to Liverpool on 7 June to look at housing conditions, and would be willing to meet council leaders while there. The council therefore postponed budgeting again until the outcome of these talks was known.

Nothing resulted from the meeting with the councillors on 7 June, with the council leadership still putting forward an illegal budget, but Jenkin agreed to meet with them again in London on 9 July. At this meeting Jenkin told the councillors that he could offer about £20m extra money for housing. This concession was treated by the leading members of Liverpool City Council as a major victory, and two days later the council set a legal budget.

=== Reactions to Liverpool ===
Other commentators agreed that Liverpool's tactics had been successful: The Times printed a leader which began "Today in Liverpool municipal militancy is vindicated" and argued that the Government had subverted "its whole local government financial policy of the past four years; it issues an open invitation to councils to say the caps don't fit and they won't wear them". Within the Conservative government the political impact was immense. While the Government had not wanted to engage in a major fight in 1984 at the same time as the miners' strike, attitudes quickly hardened. Margaret Thatcher, in a lecture in November 1984 delivered a month after she survived an assassination attempt that killed five senior Conservatives, referred to a spectrum of groups undermining rule of law: "At one end of the spectrum are the terrorist gangs within our borders, and the terrorist states which finance and arm them. At the other are the Hard Left operating inside our system, conspiring to use union power and the apparatus of local government to break, defy and subvert the law."

On the left, many thought that the outcome of Liverpool's budget dispute in 1984 had vindicated its confrontational approach.

== Formulating the campaign ==
While the Liverpool dispute was still unresolved at the end of May 1984 there was already pressure on the left-wing leadership of Lewisham London Borough Council to copy the Liverpool option and confront the Government with a deficit budget. At a meeting of Labour controlled London boroughs in mid-June, the idea of a united strategy of many councils refusing to levy a rate was introduced. The idea caught on, especially with the leaders of the four South London boroughs of Lambeth, Southwark, Lewisham and Greenwich, and with John McDonnell, chair of the finance committee of the Greater London Council. On 22 June 1984, they signed a statement published in Labour Herald which outlined the strategy.

The day after Labour Herald was published, left-wing council leaders met in Liverpool to discuss tactics. The strategy of many councils refusing to levy rates was heavily discussed: John Austin-Walker, leader of Greenwich London Borough Council was quoted saying that enough councils would join "sufficient .. to force the Government's hand". Especially in London the policy was approved by groups of Labour councillors, and by the Greater London Labour Party executive.

The Labour Party's official line was to oppose the strategy as it was illegal. Over the weekend of 7–8 July, Labour councillors met at a conference organised by the Party in Sheffield; as the invitations included moderate councils, the meeting was expected to endorse the official line. The host, leader of Sheffield city council David Blunkett wrote a paper for the conference which said that "collective action, achieving Government retreat, and not martyrdom, is the objective". The meeting adopted an attitude of non-compliance, with many councillors willing to break the law; there were also hints from Liberal spokesman on local government Simon Hughes that Liberal councillors might do the same. Non-compliance included refusing to use the system in the Rates Act which allowed a council to ask for a reassessment of its cap: to do so meant supplying any information the Secretary of State required, and gave the Secretary of State power to impose "such requirements relating to its expenditure or financial management as he thinks appropriate" on the council. Labour-run councils regarded this provision as inviting a Conservative minister to undertake detailed scrutiny of their policies with power to change them, which they refused to countenance.

=== Options under consideration ===
Once the list of councils to be capped was known, their leaders began meeting regularly under the auspices of the Local Government Information Unit, being joined by some uncapped councils (including Newham, Liverpool and Manchester) who decided to follow the same strategy because of the effect of grant penalties on their budget. Five strategies were under consideration:

1. Delaying making a rate indefinitely, with the prospect of the council running out of money and defaulting on loans
2. Set a deficit budget with a legal rate or precept, but refusing to cut spending to match
3. Set a rate above the cap
4. Refuse to make a rate or precept at all
5. Resigning en masse, or refusing to act as a governing party and going into opposition.

Of these options, the first was heavily advocated by the rate-capped councils from south London. It was strongly opposed by Liverpool, where the deputy leader Derek Hatton regarded it as "a totally negative strategy", and Militant supporting councillor Felicity Dowling complained that she had spent months arguing publicly against a formal 'no rate' stance which would have serious consequences. Liverpool felt obliged to go along with the other councils for the sake of unity although they felt sure that some of the leaders would not carry their groups in support and most of the other councils would soon drop out.

=== Labour Party conference ===
The councils facing rate-capping, together with others who were not capped but supported the campaign, hoped to get the Labour Party to vote to support their approach at the party's conference at Blackpool in early October. Local government was debated on the morning of Wednesday 3 October, with three issues to be voted on. The National Executive Committee sought approval for a statement which endorsed non-compliance with the Government and called for unity, but did not explicitly support illegality. There were then two composite motions; the first (composite 42), moved by the National Union of Public Employees, followed the lines of the NEC statement but supported councils framing budgets "which can be defined as technical illegality". The second (composite 43) was moved by Derek Hatton on behalf of Liverpool Broadgreen Constituency Labour Party declared support for "any councils which are forced to break the law as a result of the Tory government's policies".

On the previous day, Neil Kinnock had told the party not to "scorn legality", but the General Secretary of NUPE Rodney Bickerstaffe responded when moving composite 42 that the required cuts would force councils to break statutory obligations: "The question is not should we break the law, but which law shall we obey?". When summing up the debate on behalf of the NEC, David Blunkett (Leader of rate-capped Sheffield City Council) did not make clear that the NEC asked for composite 43 to be remitted, meaning withdrawn for further consideration. On a show of hands from those in the hall, the NEC statement and both composites were carried. The result, supporting illegal budgeting, dismayed the party leadership.

=== Final strategy ===
By December 1984 the first option had emerged as the preferred strategy as councils would not involve themselves in immediate illegality if they simply voted to postpone making a rate. In the new year of 1985 the strategy came under strain as the deadline for any application to reconsider the level of the cap (set at 15 January) approached; when no council applied, the deadline was extended to 24 January, but the councils held firm. However, some councils made informal approaches and the Department of the Environment revised some of the limits. The councils intending to set no rate met together to plan the campaign, and Patrick Jenkin gave them de facto recognition by meeting them as a group.

The meeting on 4 February 1985 went badly for the councils, with Jenkin refusing to abandon rate capping and grant penalties; Jenkin declared his willingness to meet the councils again if they wanted to negotiate. Shortly before, Labour leader Neil Kinnock had made clear his opposition to the policy of not setting a rate; he declared at the Labour Party local government conference that what Labour supporters were saying was "Better a dented shield than no shield at all. Better a Labour council doing its best to help us than Government placemen extending the full force of Government policy". He saw the strategy as a gesture which would not help protect services. Notwithstanding his criticism, 26 councils were still considering defying the law.

=== Legal basis ===
One of the foundations of the campaign was the knowledge that certain aspects of the law on council budgeting in 1985 were not entirely clear. What was clear was that all local authorities had a duty to set a budget and therefore an annual rate or precept, under sections 2 and 11 of the General Rate Act 1967. Precepting authorities had the additional responsibility to set their budgets and precepts at least 21 days before the start of the new financial year; as the local government financial year began on 1 April, 21 days before that was 10 March. No such duty applied to rate-making authorities. In practice most set a budget and a rate some weeks before the new financial year, but not all did; some authorities routinely made their rates after the beginning of a financial year. The General Rate Act, section 2(1), also provided that the rate had to be sufficient to meet all estimated expenditure not met by other sources, thereby making any deficit budget illegal.

Checking council activities was the responsibility of the district auditor who was appointed by the Audit Commission; if the auditor found that financial loss to the authority had been caused by the wilful misconduct of councillors, then they were under a duty to issue a certificate to the councillors responsible ordering them to repay the money in a surcharge. If the sum to be paid was more than £2,000 each, the councillor would also be disqualified from office. Councillors were held to be 'jointly and severally liable' for the sum, meaning that the total amount was recoverable from each individually should others be unable to pay.

Most councillors contemplating delaying setting a rate considered that the crucial point would come at the point in the year when the first rate payments would have become due; if the council had not set a rate at that point, it would be unable to recover the interest on the payments due to have been made to it. The General Rate Act 1967 section 50 and schedule 10 gave ratepayers the right to pay by ten instalments which were to be paid at monthly intervals during the year. With a financial year ending on 31 March, the latest date to start the payment was 1 July; the council had to give ten days' notice of a payment being due, so the latest date for setting a rate without incurring irrecoverable debts was 20 June.

=== Capping of local authorities ===
Environment Secretary Patrick Jenkin announced the list of local authorities to be capped in a statement to the House of Commons on 24 July 1984. There were 18 authorities on the list:

- Basildon District Council
- Brent London Borough Council
- Camden London Borough Council
- Greater London Council
- Greenwich London Borough Council
- Hackney London Borough Council
- Haringey London Borough Council
- Inner London Education Authority
- Islington London Borough Council
- Lambeth London Borough Council
- Leicester City Council
- Lewisham London Borough Council
- Merseyside County Council
- Portsmouth City Council
- Sheffield City Council
- Southwark London Borough Council
- South Yorkshire County Council
- Thamesdown Borough Council

Jenkin decided to limit the 1985/86 budget of 15 of these councils to the cash level of their 1984/85 budget. In the cases of the GLC, ILEA and Greenwich, where budgets were over 70% above their grant-related expenditure, and had gone up by more than 30% since 1981/82, he placed the cap at 1½% below the 1984/85 budget. 16 out of the 18 councils were under majority control by Labour at the time they were designated. The exceptions were Portsmouth, where there was a Conservative majority, and Brent where no party had an overall majority. A Labour administration had held power but when Labour councillor Ambrozine Neil joined the Conservatives in December 1983, the Conservatives took control with Liberal support.

Portsmouth City Council's Conservative leader Ian Gibson called the decision to cap his budget "iniquitous", explaining that the reason for high spending was that the council had heavy debt charges from extensive rebuilding several years before. He pledged to use the appeal mechanism, but when the matter came to a vote on 25 September the council voted not to do so.

=== Setting the cap ===
On 11 December 1984, Patrick Jenkin confirmed the list of 18 councils announced for capping and announced provisional figures for their budgets. For 12 out of the 18, the budget cap meant an absolute cut in the level of the rates to be paid by households. In January Portsmouth decided to accept the cap and make a budget within the limits which the Government was planning to impose; it was therefore removed from the list.

After the figures for the budget limitations were revised, Patrick Jenkin introduced the first order to limit budgets on the four precepting authorities (the GLC, ILEA, Merseyside and South Yorkshire) in the House of Commons on 6 February 1985. After a short debate the order was approved by 255 to 193 votes. The second order, covering the remaining 13 rate-making authorities, was set down for debate on 20 February, but on the previous day Jenkin had to agree to reconsider the limit for Haringey after receiving a letter from its district auditor saying it would have a deficit if the original limit had been imposed. At 10.15pm on the night before the order would have been debated, Jenkin announced that the debate was being delayed. After the figures for six councils were altered, revised figures for the caps were approved by a vote of 267 to 184 in the House of Commons on 25 February.

The budget restrictions imposed are shown in the table. The first column states whether the council made a rate or set a precept to be collected by other authorities on its behalf. The next column gives the 1985/86 budget limit imposed; following that are the budget plans showing what the council intended to spend in 1985/86. The maximum rate imposed by the cap (in pence) comes next, followed by the maximum percentage change on 1984/85 rate levels. The final two columns shows the rate that the council would have hoped to set, and the percentage change on 1984/85 rate levels this represented.

Authority	Rate or precept	Budget limit (£m)	Budget plans (£m)	Rate limit (p)	Rate change (%)	Desired rate (p)	Desired rate change (%)
Basildon	rate	13.7	15	50.33	+17.59	59	+38
Brent	rate	140	174	196	+1.55	350	+81.4
Camden	rate	117	133	92.02	+0.09	106	+15.48
GLC	precept	785	860	36.52	–0.08	40.58	+11
Greenwich	rate	66.5	78.3	96.42	–19.02	166	+39.5
Hackney	rate	82.3	118	147.18	+22.2	322.7	+168
Haringey	rate	128	148	268	+16.5	402	+74.5
ILEA	precept	900	957	77.25	–3.44	82.28	+2.85
Islington	rate	85.5	94	112	–8.69	165	+34.6
Lambeth	rate	113.5	131.5	107.5	–12.0	182	+48.9
Leicester	rate	24	30	25.2	–32.7	59.6	+58.9
Lewisham	rate	79	93	99.6	–13.8	162	+40.4
Merseyside	precept	205	249	82.86	+27.48	130	+100
Portsmouth	rate	limit agreed		26.88	–1.18	limit agreed	
Sheffield	rate	216	249	207	–0.56	361	+73
South Yorkshire	precept	178	206	81	–2.38	131	+57
Southwark	rate	108	131	112.6	–24.74	215	+44
Thamesdown	rate	14.2	15.9	57.2	+5.59	74	+36.9

== Capped councils which set a legal rate ==
The two capped councils that were controlled by the Conservatives, Brent and Portsmouth, were never part of the strategy of not setting a rate. Portsmouth having already accepted its cap, it set its budget without incident on 5 March 1985. Brent, where the Conservatives had taken over in December 1983, had not, but set a legal budget on 13 March 1985.

=== Merseyside and South Yorkshire ===
The two metropolitan county councils were subject to the legal requirement to make their precept by 10 March. They were also facing their own abolition at the end of March 1986. Faced with the prospect of immediate legal sanctions if they failed to do set a budget and with no continuing existence, neither were inclined to press their objections to rate-capping. At a meeting of capped councils on 19 February, both made it clear that they would set a legal precept on time. South Yorkshire County Council then made it clear publicly that it would fix a budget within the cap, and proceeded to do so at a budget meeting on 7 March.

Merseyside also decided on 7 March not to defy the cap but to set a £213m budget substantially lower than the limit: the precept was 73p which was much lower than the cap of 82.86p, meaning rates rose by 11% instead of the 27% which was allowed. The budget set no further details on council spending, but the council created a special mechanism to keep spending under the limit. The council had obtained legal advice that this course of action was risky, but likely to be accepted as legal if the council was sincerely trying to keep its budget within the cap. Council leader Keva Coombes called for extra assistance but was rebuffed by Patrick Jenkin.

=== GLC and ILEA ===
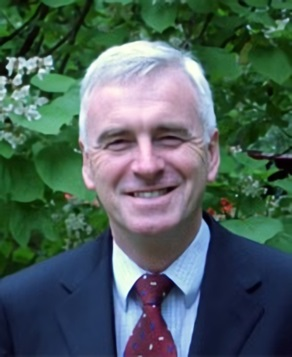
John McDonnell, finance chair of the GLC, led its campaign against rate-capping.

From an early stage, the GLC and its leader Ken Livingstone and finance chair John McDonnell were heavily involved in planning the campaign to defy rate-capping. Their involvement also took in the Inner London Education Authority which was technically a special committee of the Greater London Council, consisting of members elected to the GLC from inner London, plus one member from each of the inner London boroughs. As both the GLC and ILEA set a precept rather than a rate, both were under a legal requirement to set a budget by 10 March. Livingstone was conscious that the Labour group on the GLC had recent experience of deciding whether to defy the law, having split 23 to 22 to vote in 1981 not to comply with a House of Lords judgment ordering it to raise public transport fares. He was not confident of persuading more councillors to support defying the law on budgeting, but because the Government was intending to abolish the GLC on 31 March 1985, he went along with supporting the campaign.

Just as the tactic of not setting a rate became popular among the councils subject to rate-capping, the Government suffered a defeat in the House of Lords which gave the GLC an extra year of existence and subjecting it to budgeting and rate-capping for 1985–86. Owing to the inevitable split in the Labour group of councillors, it was agreed not to debate the issue until just before the deadline; in the meantime, to stop the Government setting a harsh cap on the budget, the council ordered that no detailed budget documents would be published. John McDonnell was given the responsibility of leading the campaign in which he claimed that the rate-capping would require a reduction of £138m in the planned spending.

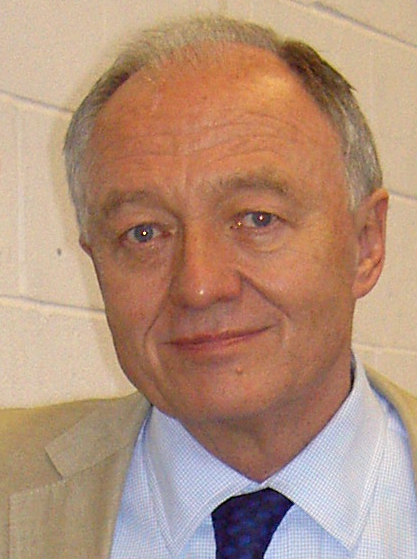
Ken Livingstone, leader of the GLC, was initially supportive but came to believe capping would not harm GLC spending plans.

As the time for voting on the budget approached, Livingstone discovered that instead of the outright illegality involved in resolving not to make a rate, the other councils were planning to exploit the legal grey area of refusing to make a rate for the time being. This strategy would put them in a different position to the GLC and ILEA who would be illegal immediately. Budget papers prepared by the Director-General Maurice Stonefrost then revealed that the capping limit still allowed the council to increase spending substantially; the papers were circulated to all members of the GLC on 1 March. A long and acrimonious debate at a Labour group meeting on 4 March agreed by 24 votes to 18 to support the legal budget with its £25m in growth. The GLC Labour group split into three factions, with one group of 10 under John McDonnell insistent on not setting a rate, another of 8 under Ken Livingstone willing to defy the law but also to accept a budget at the cap if that stance failed, and a third group unwilling to support any illegal budgeting.

First to meet was ILEA, on 7 March; supporters of the no rate strategy had hoped that it would still vote for defiance but the authority ended up adopting a legal budget by a margin of four votes. The GLC met the following day; with the chairman Illtyd Harrington not voting except to break a tie, one Labour member ill and another absent on holiday, the full voting strength was Labour 45, Conservatives 41 and Alliance 3. The first budget to be voted on was the Conservative proposal for cut in the rates to 27p; this was rejected by 48 to 38. A budget setting the rate at the maximum allowed by the cap was defeated by 59 to 30 with both Livingstone and McDonnell opposed. At this point the meeting was adjourned until Sunday 10 March, at which meeting a second attempt to set a budget at the cap level was rejected by 54 to 34. After a further budget proposed by the Conservative group was rejected, another budget at the cap level was proposed by Steve Bundred but again rejected by 53 to 36. Finally a budget proposed by moderate Labour councillor Barrie Stead, setting the rate below cap level, was passed by 60 to 26.

=== Basildon ===
From an early stage in 1984, before the official announcement of the councils to be rate-capped, Basildon had worked on the assumption that it would have its budget restricted. In March, prior to the capping list being announced, the council leadership invited the Audit Commission to independently investigate its spending, hoping that it would vindicate the council's decisions. The report found that the council's high spending was not the result of inefficiency but of policy decisions, and the fact that as a new town it had higher interest payments and higher spending on managing housing. The council duly published the report after it was capped, making much of the fact that the Audit Commission had exonerated it.

Determined to frustrate the capping order, Basildon announced at the end of February 1985 that it could evade it by setting up a limited company – Basildon Economic Development Corporation Ltd – through which the council would contract to pay grants of £140,000 to voluntary organisations. When it came to the budgeting meeting on 7 March 1985, a group of rebel Labour councillors pulled back from pressing the council to join the others in refusing to set a rate; instead the council set the rate at the limit allowed by the cap. The council leader Harry Tinworth claimed that the council had won the first round in a battle with the Government to preserve essential services. Later that month the council announced its plan to sell council mortgages to a merchant bank to raise capital finance to build sheltered homes for the elderly, also evading the cap.

== Councils joining the protest but backing down ==
=== North Tyneside ===
The north-eastern borough of North Tyneside was not rate-capped but the effect of rate penalties had reduced its rate support grant from £55m to £38m. On 26 February 1985 the Labour leadership of the council called a press conference to announce that the Labour group had decided to recommend to the council that it not set a rate, to allow negotiations with the Government to produce improved grant. At the council's budget meeting on 8 March, all Labour councillors voted along these lines; the council leader Brian Flood declared that he wished to see spending growth of £4.2m.

In the middle of March the district auditor, Brian Singleton, sent a letter to every councillor warning them of the legal dangers of delaying setting a rate. At a special council meeting called by the Conservative group on 22 March 1985, the Labour chair of the Finance Committee Harry Rutherford proposed an £83m budget which included uncommitted growth of only £300,000 instead of the £4.2m wanted by the Leader; he attracted the support of the opposition Conservative and Alliance councillors together with 12 other Labour rebels and the budget was passed. The chief whip of the Labour group Stephen Byers said that the auditor would have to check the budget was legal. Four of the thirteen Labour rebels were suspended from the party for terms between six and twelve months, and the others were reprimanded and required to give a written undertaking to observe group policy in future.

=== Thamesdown ===
After the rate-capping of Thamesdown was announced, the member of parliament for Swindon Simon Coombs (who was Parliamentary private secretary to Kenneth Baker, the local government minister) pressed the council to use the appeal mechanism provided in the Rates Act 1984. The ruling Labour group maintained the unity of the capped councils by refusing to appeal, and on this issue had the support of Conservative councillors. However the leadership of the Labour group was relatively moderate and wary of the 'no rate' strategy. Thamesdown seemed to some observers an odd target for capping; The Times' correspondent reported local rumours that it had been selected for capping in the hope that it might appeal and be removed, thereby damaging the policy of confrontation.

On 7 March, Thamesdown passed a motion declaring its inability to set a rate. The council's chief executive, David Kent, wrote to all councillors after the meeting telling them that a rate had to be set by the end of March, and pressure appeared also from the Department of Health and Social Security which warned on 21 March that there would be a problem paying Housing Benefit to the council if no rate was made. The council felt sufficiently concerned to avoid budget chaos that it set up a special resources sub-committee to agree emergency measures for ordering supplies. On 25 March the Mayor summoned a special council meeting for 28 March, while senior councillors discussed options with the borough solicitor. The meeting on 28 March saw prolonged disruption from the public gallery by those who supported continued defiance, and Mayor Harry Garrett called on the police to keep order. Among the councillors the decision was taken to approve a legal rate of 196.65p; a council spokesman claimed that the council would be going ahead with what it was going to do anyway.

=== Leicester ===
Initial figures for the rate cap of Leicester City Council would have required it to lower rates by 57%, a level which council leader Peter Soulsby described as "savage treatment". However, later figures allowed the council to include an additional £3.7m in its budget. On 7 March 1985 the council approved a budget of £30,650,000 (significantly over the cap), but not a rate to go with it; the motion also told the Secretary of State that if the rate limit and grant penalties were withdrawn, the council could set a rate rise lower than the rate of inflation. Although this vote was unanimous, the Labour leadership soon decided that there was no point in holding out. The council came under pressure not to give in, with a letter from the 'West End Rate-Capping Campaign Group' sent to each councillor urging them to continue to set no rate, and a petition of 2,000 presented to the council opposing rate-capping by Mrs Megan Armstrong who urged the council to defy the Government even if it meant breaking the law. From the other side, the Conservative group on Leicestershire County Council attempted to get their authority to initiate a judicial review as Leicester collected and passed on its precept; the attempt failed as the Liberal group opposed it.

The council leadership proposed a deficit budget at a policy committee meeting on 27 March; despite being told by city treasurer Michael Lambert that it was illegal, the committee referred it to full council the following day. Although 22 petitions containing 9,000 signatures were presented to the council meeting calling for continued defiance, the council adopted the budget; finance committee chair Graham Bett said that it was not the rate of elected councillors but of a "remote right-wing Government in London". Seven Labour councillors were absent from the meeting, continuing to support defiance.

=== Manchester ===
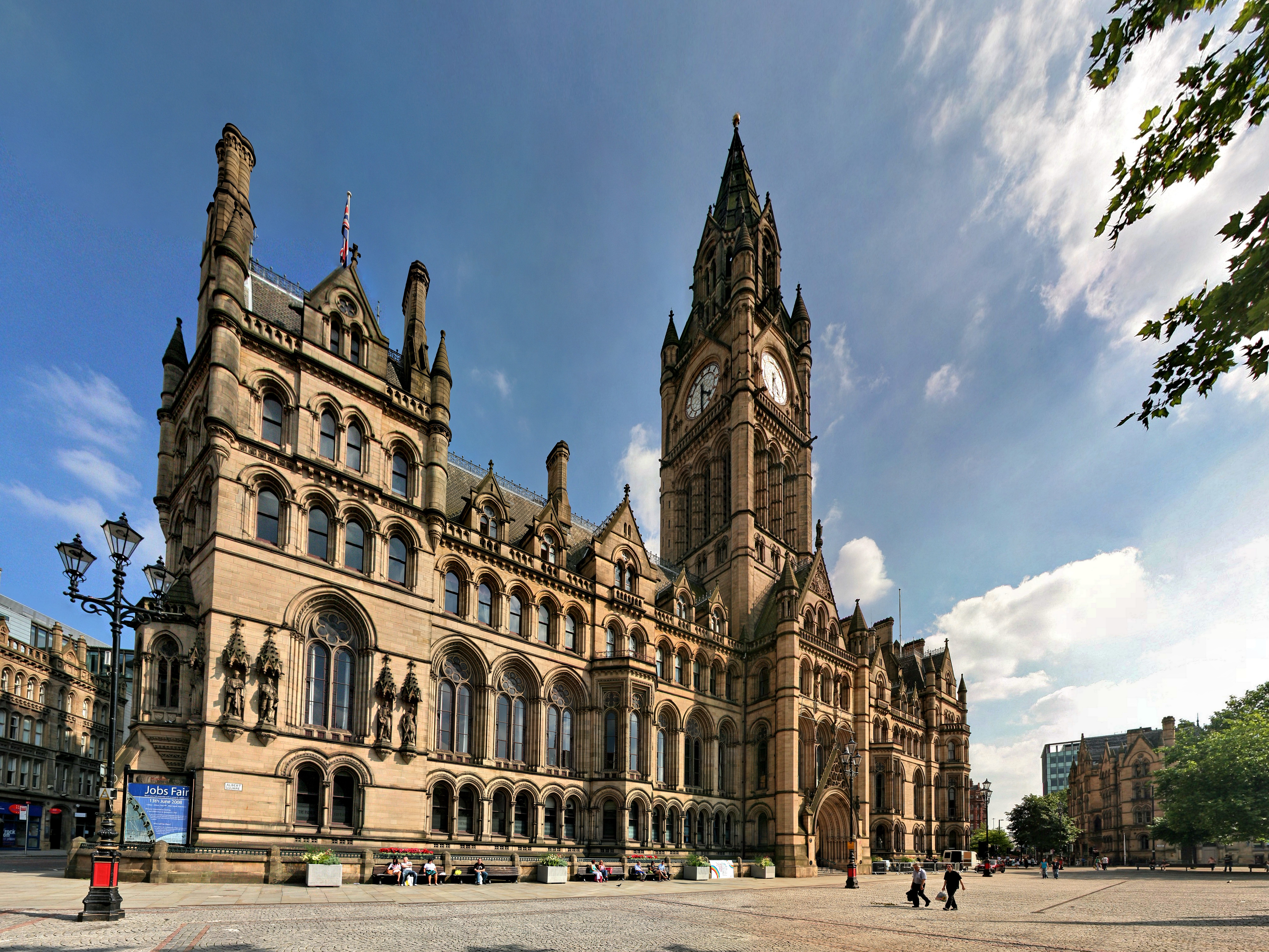
Manchester Town Hall, in front of which a rally was held in March 1985 to oppose rate-capping.

Manchester City Council was not rate-capped. However its leadership was fully committed to the strategy of not setting a rate, arguing that the effect of the grant penalties system harmed it. A large rally protesting against rate-capping was held in Manchester on 6 March 1985, followed the next day by the council voting not to set a rate. When, the following week, the opposition Liberal Party group on the council called a special meeting to propose their own budget (which included a 4.4% rate rise), the council leader Graham Stringer insisted that the no rate strategy would continue. Liberal leader David Sandiford was ruled out of order by Stringer when he attempted to speak about the no rate strategy at a Policy Committee meeting on 17 March.

Legal pressure on the council leadership began early when the District Auditor wrote to the City Clerk saying that the decision not to set a rate was 'wilful misconduct'. At the special meeting of the council on 22 March, the Liberal proposed budget was defeated, but 16 Labour councillors (including the Lord Mayor) supported it. One of them, Paul Murphy, insisted the council could make a rate without job losses. A further council meeting on 25 March saw 17 Labour councillors support the Liberal budget, but it was again rejected by 52 to 23.

On the last day of the financial year, 31 March, the council met again in its fifth budgeting meeting in a month. In a six-hour meeting, a left-wing amendment declaring it impossible to set a rate was defeated by 51–45, with 31 Labour councillors opposing it. A Conservative budget involving a 0.7% rate rise was voted down; the Labour chair of the Economic Development committee then proposed a 257.5p rate (a 6% rise) which was agreed by 83–1 with 12 abstentions. Graham Stringer declared that "Manchester's case and the national campaign has been weakened" but pledged that there would be no cuts and they would continue to support other councils.

== Councils beginning the financial year with no rate ==
=== Lewisham ===
Commitment to the no rate strategy by Lewisham, under its leader Ron Stockbridge, was strong and the council passed a motion on 7 March declaring its inability to make a rate along with many others. Lewisham worked together with the other south London boroughs of Lambeth, Southwark and Greenwich in a joint publicity campaign under the title 'Standing Together'. However, the council's stance was unexpectedly ended at a council meeting on 4 April. A group of 20 trade union members had invaded the chamber prior to the start of the meeting, protesting against rate-capping and intending to prevent the council meeting from being held at all. Labour councillors then withdrew to a separate room to discuss tactics, not noticing that after an hour the demonstration had dispersed. The Conservative councillors who remained in the council chamber then quickly convened a meeting under a temporary chairman, and passed a budget reducing rates by 6%.

The Labour group, incensed at being caught off guard, took legal advice but were told that the budget as approved was "more legal than not". The Conservative councillor who had led the initiative of calling the meeting claimed that Labour councillors had told him it was the best thing to happen, as it removed the threat of disqualification and surcharge while allowing Labour to blame the Conservatives locally for any service cuts. However, Ron Stockbridge subsequently resigned as council leader.

=== Haringey ===
The Government had been forced to change the level of the cap on Haringey Borough Council due to the discovery that it had overpaid housing subsidy. Due to the system of penalties, the repayment of £5m required a rate rise of £16m. On 7 March, the council passed a motion in similar terms to others, declaring its inability to make a rate. At the next meeting on 4 April, all 34 members of the Labour group stuck to their decision and were joined by an independent councillor in voting not to set a rate (23 Conservatives disagreed). However at a party meeting on 10 April the attitude of the council leadership had changed and a significant split opened up.

Council leader George Meehan proposed at a meeting of Labour Party councillors that a legal rate be set at the council meeting the day after, but was defeated by "a clear majority" in favour of delaying a rate until 29 April by which time the council would have met ministers. Meehan then offered his resignation. At the council meeting Meehan formally proposed the legal rate and then joined with 12 other Labour councillors and the opposition Conservative group to pass it; the majority of the Labour group voted in favour of delay until 29 April. Meehan then left office and Bernie Grant succeeded him as leader.

=== Newham ===
Although not capped, Newham was severely affected by grant penalties. It had worked with the capped councils and decided to join the campaign: on 7 March the council members unanimously passed a motion declaring that they could not set a rate. Council deputy leader Alan Mattingly said that the majority of councillors would go to jail rather than cut services. It was soon clear that there was a significant split in the Labour group as Leader Jack Hart told a council meeting on 28 March that the Government would not increase their spending limit and urged members to be realistic. His ally, councillor David Gilles, proposed a budget of £151.5m. Alan Mattingly by contrast urged the council to stand firm and despite Hart's support the budget was defeated by 18 to 35; a budget proposed by the SDP was voted down by 20 to 33.

In April the council leadership received a warning from the trade unions representing council workers that their support for the council's stance was limited and "the day you stop paying wages then our fight is with you". A meeting of Labour councillors on 15 April agreed to support a budget of £150.6m, and a council meeting the following day approved it.

=== Sheffield ===
With council leader David Blunkett holding a place on the Labour Party National Executive Committee, Sheffield was one of the most prominent Labour councils of the 1980s and Blunkett was an unofficial spokesman on behalf of Labour in local government. One of the rallies held on 6 March to protest against rate-capping was held in Sheffield. On 7 March the council passed a budget (including capital spending which was not subject to the cap) of £249m, which was £31.1m over the cap; £11.8m of the gap was met from reserves. The council then passed a motion calling for income and expenditure to be reconciled and instructed the Policy Committee to prepare a detailed budget. The council did not set the rate to go with the budget but instead passed a motion declaring that it could not set a rate. Later in March the council passed a second resolution which explained that it would not set a rate until learning the outcome of Greenwich borough council's application for judicial review which was due to be heard on 12 April.

Sheffield's own action for judicial review of its spending limit ended on 2 April when Mr Justice Woolf refused it permission, ruling that while the High Court had jurisdiction, any matter involving political judgment should be dealt with through the democratic processes; an appeal failed on 2 May. A further meeting on 24 April again postponed setting a rate. By the beginning of May, leading members of the council were acknowledging the risks of their stance: the deputy leader Alan Billings talked of "asking people to commit political suicide for the greater good", while Blunkett talked in Tribune of "those who look for corpses .. to prove that there has been a genuine struggle". Blunkett appealed for campaigners to avoid a shambles such as had happened at the GLC.

On 7 May the council came to a crunch meeting at which the council leadership put forward a motion which stopped delaying fixing a rate but instead refused to set a rate until the Government began negotiating. It was understood that this motion would invite immediate legal action. Instead, after a five-hour meeting, 20 Labour councillors voted with the Liberal and Conservative groups on the council in favour of an amendment to set a rate within the cap limit; the amendment passed by 46 to 38 with one abstention. After the vote, it was noticed that the rate demands sent out by the council appeared to have been printed before the council had formally set the rate. The problems for Sheffield did not end there as the council leadership asked chief officers to implement the original budget. A report by the district auditor in July declared Sheffield's deficit budget illegal and the council had to instruct the service committees to reduce spending in line with a capped budget.

=== Tower Hamlets ===
Tower Hamlets London Borough Council, which was not capped, was in the unusual position of being unable to set a rate due to the actions of dissenting councillors from the majority group combining with the opposition. The council had a leadership from the right wing of the Labour Party; council leader John Riley argued that the rates were high enough and that ratepayers ought not to have a massive increase. However two left-wing Labour councillors Chris Rackley and Thérèse Shanahan announced that they would join with the opposition Liberal group to support a 'no cuts' budget. Their stance attracted others and the Labour budget was defeated with nine Labour councillors voting against it.

The response of the Labour leadership was to expel the nine rebels, a move opposed by the Greater London Labour Party and by the majority of Labour Party members in the borough. This move reduced the Labour group to a minority on the council. When the Mayor Bob Ashkettle attempted to put through a budget at a council meeting on 23 April with an 8% rise, legal advice was sought and the motion was ruled unconstitutional. The Liberal group was opposed to this budget, demanding extra spending. The leadership then tried to compromise, but an extra £3.5m in the budget failed to shift the Liberal opposition on 8 May. It was not until a meeting on 14 May 1985 called by the Liberal group that a rate was set by 33 votes to 10.

=== Hackney ===
Support for the no rate strategy among leading councillors in Hackney was among the strongest anywhere. The open declaration by the council of its intentions led one Hackney resident, Mourad Fleming, to go to law before the council held its budgeting meeting seeking judicial review of the council's actions. In February 1985 Fleming had been the SDP candidate in a byelection in Hackney's Clissold ward which had been won by a Labour candidate pledged to the no rate strategy. On 6 March 1985 in the High Court, Mr Justice Mann issued an interlocutory declaration that the council had a duty to set a rate which did not breach the cap and that it could not use interim borrowing powers. Notwithstanding the judgment and firm advice from the borough solicitor that the council had to set a rate, on 7 March the council passed a resolution declaring that "the council considers it would be impossible to make a rate". The resolution disguised the refusal to set a rate as a delay pending negotiation with the Secretary of State.

On 20 March, council leader Hilda Kean declared that the council would be bankrupt by the middle of April if unable to set a rate and abjured the use of creative accounting to evade the cap. The council slightly softened its policy on 28 March, declaring that it was only deferring making a rate and committing to making a legal rate in due course; a motion to stick to the previous formula was defeated by 32 to 24. The council having ignored the High Court's interlocutory declaration, Mourad Fleming's judicial review application proceeded to trial on 1 April; Fleming agreed to vary an order and let the council use borrowing powers in the 1985/86 financial year, but said that he would ask the court to appoint a receiver to run the council if no rate was set. At the end of the hearing, Mr Justice Woolf found both Hackney's resolutions of 7 and 28 March unlawful and quashed them but refused to immediately order the council to set a rate. Instead he adjourned the case to 16 April.

Mr Justice Woolf's judgment on 16 April observed that the council "have determined, irrespective of their legal duty, not to make a rate". Having decided that this was unlawful, he then grappled with the issue of the discretion available to the council of when to set its rate which he found the council had to use reasonably and in the interests of ratepayers. Woolf again declined to issue an order of mandamus compelling the council to set a rate, instead stating that he would do so unless Hackney indicated it would make a rate within an acceptable timescale. After hearing submissions about what such a timescale would be, he decided to give the council "a relatively liberal period of time in which to give effect to this judgment" and fixed the end of May as the deadline. On 2 May, Hackney also lost its appeal against the ruling in its own judicial review challenge of the Secretary of State's spending guidance, and was refused leave to appeal to the House of Lords. The council was warned by the borough solicitor that the legal costs of attempting further legal challenge would probably be the subject of a surcharge of councillors.

By the middle of May it was clear that enough Labour councillors in Hackney had become willing to vote for a legal budget and that the council would not defy the court judgment. A group of Labour councillors joined with the council's Liberal group to produce an acceptable budget. An attempt to hold a budgeting meeting on 16 May was thwarted when some staff at Hackney Town Hall staff locked up the building and refused to allow councillors in; when the council met on 22 May, it allowed addresses by delegations from trade unions and community groups at which the secretary of the joint shop stewards Alf Sullivan described what was proposed as "a bent budget" introduced to "cover your retreat from the fight". When the vote on the budget was called at 12:45 AM, the chamber was invaded with the result that the meeting was adjourned to the following day. On 23 May the council finally approved a legal budget put forward by Labour councillor Tony Millwood. 24 Labour councillors joined six Conservatives and three Liberals to pass it, while 26 Labour councillors remained opposed. Hilda Kean, who said the decision was a betrayal, resigned the leadership along with her deputy Andrew Puddephatt.

=== Southwark ===
Part of a group of four south London boroughs, with whom it had formed a joint publicity campaign, Southwark was strongly committed to the no rate strategy. The council duly passed a motion on 7 March declaring its inability to set a rate, and at the end of March reiterated its stance by a large majority. When the council asked ratepayers to keep paying the same rates as the previous year, the local government minister William Waldegrave said in Parliament that until a rate was set, ratepayers need not pay anything.

While the leadership was determined not to set a rate, there were moderate Labour councillors who were willing to defy the whip to vote for a legal budget. Supporters sought to prevent them from being put in such a position. On 16 April, council leader Tony Ritchie prevented a meeting called to set a legal rate from continuing by using powers under the council's standing orders to adjourn pending new advice; the meeting lasted only two minutes. A further meeting on 24 April was also swiftly adjourned, although on this occasion it was because Ritchie collapsed and had to be taken to hospital. When the council finally met on 26 April, the chamber was invaded by members of tenants groups and council staff with the result that the meeting broke up and was cancelled by the Mayor.

On 1 May the council managed to meet, and the meeting went on for seven hours of angry debate. It resulted in a legal budget written by Labour moderates, which would have cut the rates, being voted down by the Labour leadership and the Conservative group. A further, more orderly, meeting on 8 May voted down a Conservative budget and a deficit budget proposed as a compromise by a minority faction in the Labour group. The next day, the District Auditor Brian Skinner wrote to all councillors in authorities which had not yet set rates telling them to do so without delay and certainly before the end of May deadline given by the High Court in the Hackney case. The council maintained its defiance at the next meeting on 16 May, but by a margin of only one vote (24 to 23). On 23 May, a vote to continue not setting a rate was passed only on the casting vote of the Mayor.

As the end of May deadline approached, the Conservative group leader Toby Eckersley voiced his dislike of the pressure put on him to vote for a budget featuring an increase in spending of 34% to solve the dispute, especially since the motion also included political criticism of the Conservative government. Finally at a meeting on 30 May, the council voted by 26 to 23 to set a rate at the maximum level allowed, although the budget did not fund £9.5m of spending commitments. The final voting showed that 25 Labour councillors had supported the budget together with one Independent, 21 Labour councillors and two Independents had opposed, while the eight Conservative and two Liberal councillors had joined one Labour councillor in abstaining.

=== Islington ===
The leader of Islington borough council, Margaret Hodge, had chaired the meeting of the Labour london boroughs in June 1984 at which the strategy of setting no rate had been decided upon, and according to Ken Livingstone, claimed to have come up with the idea. Hodge was one of the public leaders of the campaign and on the evening of Thursday 7 March the council organised a people's festival in the civic auditorium while the council formally voted not to set a rate. On 22 April the council published the results of an opinion poll it had commissioned which showed that 57% of people in Islington supported the council in the struggle, with 20% supporting the Government. Asked what the council should do, the poll found 37% wanted the council to continue not to set a rate, 27% wanted the council to resign and force an election on the issue, and 21% wanted the council to set a legal rate.

When the council met again on 23 April, the members had been warned by District Auditor Brian Skinner of "serious consequences" including surcharge should they decide not to set a rate; Margaret Hodge ignored the advice and commented as she moved the motion that she would not "abandon the collective unity that is so important in the struggle against the Government". However the council sent out a circular requesting ratepayers to volunteer rate payments in accordance with the previous years' demands. The council deliberately took steps to justify its delay in setting a rate by obtaining counsel's opinion; on 26 April Hodge wrote to Brian Skinner declaring that "important [specified] matters justifying such a deferral arose" and that "matters [have been] taken to minimize and cancel any possible losses which might arise".

After a series of warning letters, District Auditor Skinner was invited to Islington Town Hall on 8 May to meet the council leaders and discuss his draft report on Islington. Skinner found that the streets outside were full of thousands of demonstrators supporting the council, which the councillors insisted had arrived spontaneously. Despite police protection he was kicked when attempting to leave after the meeting, and had to be smuggled out lying on the back seat of a police car covered by coats. An application for an emergency debate in the House of Commons by Islington North MP Jeremy Corbyn was turned down that afternoon.

As with other councils still without a budget, the auditor had ordered Islington to set a legal rate by the end of May or face an extraordinary audit. On 30 May, the Local Government committee of the Islington Labour Party narrowly voted to support a legal rate, and the following day Margaret Hodge proposed a legal budget to the council. The galleries were crowded with people urging the council to continue the fight and an amendment to continue to defer setting a rate was moved by Chris Calnan, but the amendment was lost by 34 votes to 10 with six abstentions and Islington duly set a legal rate a few hours before the deadline.

=== Camden ===
All 33 Labour councillors on Camden Borough Council voted on 7 March against setting a rate; they included Stephen Bevington who had only been elected a week before on a platform of setting no rate. The Conservative group on the council, who had supported setting the rate at the level of the cap, immediately called for surcharges on councillors where the delay in setting the rate led to financial losses for the council. At a Labour group meeting on 26 March, Alan Woods moved a motion to declare that Camden would continue to refuse to set a rate even if other boroughs gave up; with council leader Phil Turner abstaining, the motion was lost by 15 votes to 14.

For the moment the council continued, citing the forthcoming judicial review action by Greenwich as justification. In the middle of April, a Labour councillor was quoted by the Hampstead & Highgate Express contemplating alternate strategies of non-compliance and worrying about drifting into surcharge and disqualification "through nothing more than indecision, confusion and default", although the council continued to vote against setting a rate at its meeting on 24 April.

Along with other councils who had set no rate, Camden was sent a statutory report by the district auditor Brian Skinner on 9 May giving them until the end of May to set a rate or face an extraordinary audit. The Conservative opposition thought this move may have been counter-productive, and the council went until 5 June before meeting. This meeting continued until 3 am when ten Labour councillors rebelled to vote through a budget proposed by former council leader Roy Shaw which passed by 33 to 26. Shaw, who was a member of the Audit Commission, had agreed with the Deputy Controller of the commission that he would be alerted before his council position came into conflict with his audit role. The budget agreed by Camden was prima facie unbalanced and illegal as it showed expenditure of £132.46m against a cap of £117.609m, but by counting income from the GLC's 'stress borough' fund and using accounting tricks, it came into balance.

=== Greenwich ===
Greenwich had shown early interest in leading a fight against rate-capping, and its leader John Austin-Walker had signed the personal statement published in Labour Herald on 22 June 1984. The council duly passed a resolution declaring its inability to set a rate, and John Austin-Walker accepted that his refusal to cut spending "may place us beyond the law". The council brought its own proceedings for judicial review against the government's decision to cap its budget, which was set down for initial hearing on 12 April with the main hearing not until 19 June. In April the council sent out standing order forms to ratepayers which were calculated on the basis of a budget at the cap limit, but denied that this marked a concession.

On 19 April the council was warned by the District Auditor Brian Skinner that the judge's decision in the Hackney case not to require the council to set a rate did not give Greenwich the same leeway, but on 24 April the council again refused to set a rate. The auditor followed up with a formal audit report on 9 May, giving a deadline of the end of that month to set a rate, accompanied by counsel's opinion which stated that the pending High Court case did not override the council's legal duty to make a rate. The council had obtained its own counsel's opinion that refusing to make a rate pending the outcome of the High Court case was reasonable, and the auditor's opinion took steps to nullify it by stating "A councillor cannot escape from being guilty of misconduct by relying on advice of counsel where that advice is shown to be wrong". The borough solicitor Tony Child continued to insist that the council still had discretion to refuse to make a rate.

Despite the auditor's deadline, Greenwich voted by 39 to 19 against setting a rate on 29 May, although it quietly stopped using the demand for spending concessions as a reason for its actions. A 12-hour council meeting called on Saturday 8 June eventually voted to set a rate, under two weeks before the High Court hearing on which the council had pinned its hopes. The judicial review went ahead but on 18 July Greenwich was notified that it had lost: Mr Justice McNeill ruled that the government acted lawfully. Greenwich appealed but the Court of Appeal upheld the judgment.

=== Liverpool ===
Despite their doubts about the strategy, the leaders of Liverpool City Council were keen not to damage the unity of the campaign; after the previous year's experience the council believed there was no legal requirement to set a rate until June. Accordingly, on budget day in 1985, Liverpool's Finance Committee chairman Tony Byrne stated that the council needed a £265m budget, but because the Government grant penalties restricted them to £222m, the council would not set a rate. There was one significant change from the past year, as the Audit Commission had appointed Tim McMahon as the new District Auditor for Liverpool at the beginning of May 1985. McMahon wrote to all councillors on 21 May warning them that not setting a rate by the end of the month would result in an extraordinary audit and asking them individually for reasons why they should not be surcharged. The council's leadership believed that the deadline really was 20 June, and had pencilled in a meeting on 14 June for setting a rate.

On 10 June, the auditor sent out letters to the Liverpool councillors reporting that the council's failure to set a rate that financial year had already caused a loss of £106,103, and notifying them of an extraordinary audit under section 20 of the Local Government Finance Act 1982. According to council deputy leader Derek Hatton, the letters had the effect of prolonging the dispute: "According to McMahon's assessment of the situation, we had already broken the law. So what the hell had we to lose by doing it again?" Their continued defiance took the form of a deficit budget involving a 9% rise in rates, which was to produce £236m, but also approving £265m of spending. The budget was approved by 49 to 42 on 14 June, with five Labour councillors opposed. The council leadership saw the deficit budget as a tactic to comply with the law in one sense and so buy time.

The council was given notice of an extraordinary audit on 26 June with the auditor concentrating on the council's loss of interest on payments from the Department of Health and Social Security (which would have covered the rate rebates element in housing benefit subsidy), and on payments from the Treasury Valuer (which paid contributions in lieu of rates on Crown property). The amount of both of these payments depended on the level of rates, and so no payment could be made until the level of rates was set.

=== Lambeth ===
From the start, Lambeth had been in the forefront of the campaign. Despite rumours that three might break ranks, all 34 Labour councillors present voted on 7 March 1985 not to set a rate. As the new financial year approached, Labour councillor Stewart Cakebread dissented, saying that a budget set at the cap limit would not require cuts. The Conservative group summoned an emergency meeting on 10 April 1985 but their proposal for a legal rate was defeated by 34 to 30. A second Labour councillor, Janet Boston, rebelled at a special policy committee meeting on 30 April, supporting a Conservative motion to call a special council meeting on Sunday 5 May; both Boston and Cakebread were barristers. Meanwhile, council officials estimated that the failure to set a rate by 1 May had already cost the council £170,000 in lost interest.

As had happened on other councils, the district auditor wrote to all councillors on 9 May telling them that an extraordinary audit would follow if no rate had been set by the end of the month; council leader Ted Knight insisted that the council would not set a rate at its meeting on 15 May "or any time after until the Government returns the money it has taken from us". At this meeting a third Labour councillor, Vince Leon, joined Boston and Cakebread in voting for legal budgets. Boston and Cakebread were removed from all committees by the Lambeth Labour Group at the end of the month, and Boston was told to resign her seat by her local ward Labour Party (she refused). Cakebread received the support of his branch.

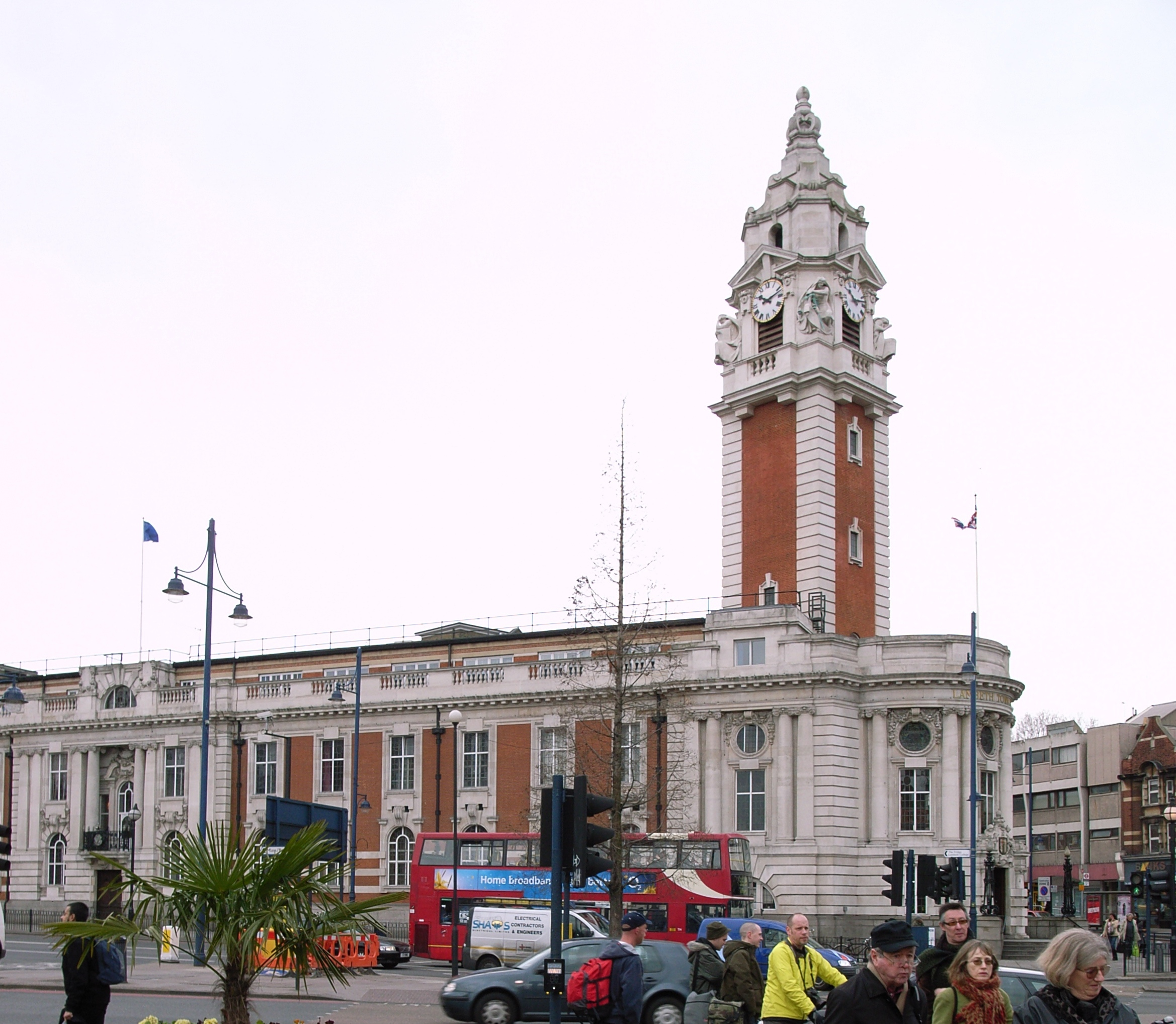
Lambeth Town Hall, a focus for the council's protests and also where territory was recaptured from the Auditor.

The district auditor, Brian Skinner, found that his permission to use offices in Lambeth Town Hall allocated to NALGO was withdrawn in mid-May; he was also surprised to discover his photograph on a threatening mock 'Wanted' poster in his local supermarket. Skinner's employers, the Audit Commission, sought police assistance in tracking down and destroying copies of the poster. After a council meeting on 5 June again rejected a legal budget (by 32–30), the Audit Commission stated that a letter would be sent immediately to all councillors who had not voted for the motion (possibly including two Conservatives who had been absent) notifying them of an extraordinary audit and possible surcharge over lost interest which by then amounted to over £270,000.

While the council finances were sustained by loans amounting to £29m from the Public Works Loan Board, the resignation of Labour councillor Mike Bright on 21 June 1985 put those supporting continued defiance in the minority. Bright wrote a resignation letter revealing he saw no hope of success and expected to be surcharged: "Martyrdom, however heroic, is usually the sign of a lost cause". Ted Knight described Bright as a "victim of [the state] machine". After a formal notice of an extraordinary audit was published on 18 June, 32 councillors received notice on 27 June that the auditor deemed them liable to a surcharge of £126,947. The response of the councillors was to set up a 'Fighting Fund' in their defence, which was supported at its launch by the prominent actors Jill Gascoine, Frances de la Tour, Matthew Kelly, and Timothy West; the Labour group debated whether Mike Bright ought to be eligible for help from the fund.

At the next council meeting on 3 July, there was uproar after members of Vauxhall Constituency Labour Party unfurled a banner from the public gallery behind the Conservative group. When Conservative councillor Tony Green tore the banner down, Labour councillor Terry Rich rushed across to confront him and was only held back in a headlock by another councillor. The meeting was adjourned for 20 minutes. When it resumed, Janet Boston and Stuart Cakebread moved a legal rate which was passed by 32 to 31. The council was able to avoid cuts in planned spending with the aid of additional £5.5m housing subsidy from the Government and £6m from the Greater London Council's 'stress boroughs' scheme. The Lambeth Fighting Fund therefore claimed the campaign had been a success "in financial terms".

== Aftermath ==
Although Lambeth was the last council to set a rate for the year, many aspects of the ratecapping fight were not settled.

=== The extraordinary audits ===
On 9 September 1985 the district auditors for Lambeth and Liverpool gave notice to 81 councillors (49 from Liverpool, 32 from Lambeth) that the delay in fixing the rates was wilful misconduct and so they were required to repay the costs as a surcharge: £106,103 in Liverpool, £126,947 in Lambeth. In both cases the amount per councillor was over £2,000 and therefore they were also disqualified. The district auditor found that Lambeth Borough Council had been embarked, since at least September 1984, on a political campaign against the Rates Act 1984 and the Government. Since its failure to make a rate was a political lever in that battle, the failure was wilful misconduct and therefore the councillors responsible were liable for the surcharge to make good the cost of the council's actions. The surcharged councillors from both Lambeth and Liverpool appealed to the High Court against the surcharges; when the case opened on 14 January 1986, counsel for the Lambeth councillors, Lionel Read QC, argued that the cost of delaying setting a rate was a legitimate expense in an attempt to secure more money from the Government which might have succeeded. He also argued that the loss of interest was not irrecoverable.

The Lambeth Fighting Fund had raised £74,000 by the opening of the High Court case, of which £69,000 had already been spent. The council had also spent £31,050 on publicity for what it termed "Lambeth Rates Democracy", spending which was criticised by the Conservative group. The High Court delivered its judgment on 6 March 1986, finding heavily against the councils. Lord Justice Glidewell described the stance of the councillors as "mere political posturing"; Mr Justice Caulfield described the evidence of wilful misconduct as "crushing" and the councillors' stance as having "reached a pinnacle of political perversity".

The judgment came just before full council elections were due in Lambeth, which had elections for every seat once every four years. If the councillors appealed and lost, they would be disqualified in the middle of the term, endangering Labour control of the council. The Lambeth Labour group decided (with seven dissenting) that it was better not to appeal, accept the disqualifications and select replacement candidates for the impending elections. After holding a special meeting to transfer running of the council up to the election to a special committee consisting of three Labour councillors who had not been surcharged (Janet Boston, and two had been elected in byelections after the rate was set), the councillors were disqualified on 30 March. The Transport and General Workers' Union ended financial support for the Liverpool and Lambeth councillors at the beginning of April, having spent £107,000 up to then. At the end of July 1986, the surcharged Lambeth councillors were given 21 months to pay off the surcharges; they were to pay £5,000 per month between them.

Liverpool had elections three years out of four, with one third of councillors elected in each election. The Liverpool councillors did appeal – bringing in the argument that the extraordinary audit had not notified the councillors of their right for an oral hearing to put their case before making a finding of wilful misconduct. The Court of Appeal agreed that an oral hearing ought to have been allowed, but that the subsequent High Court hearing had cured that deficiency. The councillors then appealed to the House of Lords which unanimously rejected the appeal on 12 March 1987, ruling that the auditor's procedure was fair and not prejudiced against the council. The total surcharge to be paid by 47 current and former councillors (two had died in the meantime) amounted to £333,000.

Just as the Lambeth councillors' five-year disqualification was ending, they were sent further letters inviting them to attend a hearing at Lambeth Town Hall on 3 April 1991 which was to look at the final year's accounts for 1985–86. The auditor was looking into whether the council's final outturn, which showed an additional loss of interest amounting to £212,000 over and above the amount surcharged in 1986, should be the subject of a new surcharge. Former council leader Ted Knight described it as a "witch hunt", asserting that it had been a political decision by the Government to suspend the councillors from office for a further five years and that it amounted to being tried twice for the same offence. No further surcharge was levied.

=== Liverpool budget ===
Liverpool's adoption of a deficit budget for 1985/86 meant that the council quickly ran short of money. By September it was apparent that without a new source of funds, the council would be insolvent in December; as an employer it was therefore obliged to issue 90-day redundancy notices to its entire workforce. After this decision was announced on 6 September, the council's joint shop stewards called for an indefinite strike, and also occupied council buildings and prevented the council from holding a meeting to formally vote to issue the redundancy notices. The national leaderships of the trade unions attempted to restrain their local branches from going ahead with the strike, and when NALGO members voted against the strike by 7,284 to 8,152, it was called off.

The redundancy notices were issued on 27 September, together with a letter from the council's leader and deputy leader (John Hamilton and Derek Hatton) explaining that there was no intention to make any employee redundant but that the notices were a legal requirement. With time running out, the council had to hire taxis to distribute the notices. At the Labour Party conference the following week, David Blunkett agreed with Hatton that the GLC's Director-General Maurice Stonefrost could offer advice to Liverpool. Stonefrost suggested increasing rates by 15%, and cutting the housing programme. The council's budget problems for the 1985–86 financial year were only solved when the council removed £23m from its capital budget to fund revenue spending, and borrowed £30m from Swiss banks to replenish the capital fund. The council also transferred £3m in loans which it had given to other Labour councils and found £3m of budget savings. The council's Finance Committee approved this plan on 26 November 1985.

=== The audit process ===
The district auditors operated under the control of the Audit Commission, which was a body established by (although operationally independent of) central government. Given the highly politicised fight, there was speculation that the Government was encouraging the commission. Looking back on the history, Martin Loughlin noted that the Government did not appear to be formally directing the commission, but that there was probably extensive consultation. The Commissioners had on 6 June 1985 directed the extraordinary audits of Lambeth and Liverpool, although by that time the district auditors were already planning to take this course. The auditors calculated the loss to the council as being the amount lost from interest payments on the amount paid by the Department of Health and Social Services and the Treasury Valuer which were unable to be paid until a rate was set; Martin Loughlin notes that this interest had instead accrued to the Government and therefore no money was lost to the public purse.

Given that other councils went into the new financial year having deliberately set no rate, and seven had incurred financial loss through their delay, Audit Commissioners considered whether to subject them to the same audits as had been ordered on Lambeth and Liverpool. As the formal notice of surcharges were being sent to the Lambeth and Liverpool councillors in autumn 1985, it was not clear to the commissioners whether there was a significant distinction between them and the councils which had backed down earlier. At regular meetings of the commission, deputy controller Cliff Nicholson had to give an update; his regular answer was that auditors were awaiting information from the councils before they could proceed. There were several reasons to delay action: the Lambeth and Liverpool appeals were proceeding, ratepayers were separately objecting to the accounts, and new auditors in Islington and Hackney were being challenged by the councils. The commission also needed legal advice whether to proceed against all seven councils together, or one at a time.

A Conservative member of the commission, Ian Coutts, became concerned at the prolonged delay. The 2008 history of the Audit Commission, "Follow the Money", notes that the controller and deputy controller had decided before the end of 1985 that having acted on Lambeth and Liverpool, it would be better to take no action on the others, and then sought reasons to justify this lack of action. One of the reasons for this stance was concern that Lambeth and Liverpool appeals might be successful; another was that no council sought to follow the same strategy in the next financial year. Writing a decade earlier, Martin Loughlin also believed that having made an example of Lambeth and Liverpool, the most confrontational councils, the Audit Commission had no need to pursue the others.

After the High Court ruled in favour of the auditor on Liverpool and Lambeth, the commission obtained legal advice from Robert Alexander QC who agreed that taking on other councils would be useless. David Blunkett agreed in an interview in New Society in March 1986 that pursuing other councils would look "highly political" and would negate what the commission had achieved in auditing Lambeth and Liverpool. Although the district auditor for Sheffield prepared two papers in March 1987, one justifying the issue of a certificate of wilful misconduct and the other not, and obtained a legal opinion advising him to submit the first, he decided to take no action; no other auditor sought to pursue losses due to late setting of rates.

=== Legal changes ===
The Government quickly moved to cut off the chances for a repeat of the tactic of setting no rate, by introducing legislation which set a deadline for approving a budget. Professor Malcolm Grant, a leading local government academic, regarded it as remarkable that they had neglected to block this gap in the Rates Act 1984. The Local Government Act 1986, which in section 1 required councils to set a rate by 1 April each year, received Royal Assent on 26 March 1986.

This Act was followed by the Local Government Act 1988, which gave auditors power to issue a 'prohibition order' to negate any decision by a local council which would lead to a breach in the law, and also gave auditors the power to initiate a judicial review of any decision or failure to act which might have an effect on the council's accounts. The Audit Commission welcomed the second power in particular as it was broadly worded. The Local Government and Housing Act 1989 then required local authorities to designate one of their officers as a "Monitoring Officer" who would have the duty of alerting the Director of Finance to any legally questionable decision.

=== Political effects ===
Stewart Lansley, writing in the Labour Party journal New Socialist in July 1985, argued that the ratecapping fight had very quickly turned from councils fighting the Government into a fight within the Labour Party. He pointed out that three leaders of Labour councils had resigned when budgets were passed, and council meetings had seen angry scenes of abuse, recrimination and intimidation; dissenting councillors in Southwark had been sent white feathers. Martin Loughlin, author of "Legality and Locality", ascribed the reason for the failure of the ratecapping challenge to the councils not being as united as they appeared; some had viewed it as a direct confrontation of the Government, while the majority saw an opportunity to exploit an ambiguity in the law. Only a very small number of councils could get a majority for a blatantly unlawful policy. Labour Party leader Neil Kinnock told the party's Local Government committee on 10 March 1986 that there was no possibility of a Labour government extending a retrospective indemnity from surcharges.

The Labour Party conference was held in the week that Liverpool's council employees received their redundancy notices. On the morning that Labour Party leader Neil Kinnock was due to make his speech, an article by the Anglican and Roman Catholic Bishops of Liverpool David Sheppard and Derek Worlock denounced the Militant leadership and council's "policy of confrontation". Kinnock's speech denounced "the grotesque chaos of a Labour council – a Labour council – hiring taxis to scuttle round a city, handing out redundancy notices to its own workers". In the aftermath of the speech, the Labour Party National Executive Committee suspended the Liverpool district Labour Party and ordered an investigation, which resulted eventually in the expulsion of all Militant tendency members from the Labour Party.

=== Ongoing rate capping ===
With the use of 'creative accounting' techniques by councils to conceal spending while remaining within the law, rate capping did not immediately lead to the reductions in local government spending for which the Government was hoping. One observer saw no evidence of redundancies through capping before 1987. The Audit Commission kept a close eye on the techniques of creative accounting, under pressure from the Department of the Environment which criticised the commission's "apparent inability to date to make any impact" on it. Council practices grew more sophisticated as the number of Public Interest Reports issued by district auditors increased. However it was only legislative changes which succeeded in stopping the unorthodox financial practices. The Local Government Act 1985 introduced automatic precept limitation for the new authorities created by it in the metropolitan counties.

Just as the fight between local authorities and the Government over rate-capping was starting in March 1985, the Government was deciding whether to proceed with a proposal for a new form of tax for local government replace to replace Rates, which would take the form of a flat rate charge for each individual adult resident living within the area of the local council. According to one published history of this reform, the fight and the acrimony over rate-capping helped to encourage the Government and the Prime Minister in particular to support this change. This proposal was eventually enacted as the Community Charge. For the 1986–87 financial year, twelve local authorities were rate-capped. Ten of them had been rate-capped the previous year (Basildon, Camden, Greenwich, Hackney, Haringey, Islington, Lambeth, Lewisham, Southwark and Thamesdown); two were newly selected, Liverpool and Newcastle upon Tyne. The following year, 1987–88, saw 20 authorities rate-capped and in 1988–89 there were 17.

In June 1990, after a favourable opinion from the Government's law officers, it was decided to use the power to issue a general limitation on local government budgets in all authorities which had been enacted in the Rates Act 1984 but had remained unused until then. This decision removed most local government financial autonomy. This 'universal capping' continued from the 1991–92 financial year until 1998–99; when it was ended the Secretary of State took reserve powers under the Local Government Act 1999 to regulate increases in the Council Tax (which had replaced the Community Charge). The Secretary of State was also allowed to require reduction in individual local authorities' budgets.

== Sources ==
- Baker, Kenneth (1993). The Turbulent Years. London: Faber & Faber. ISBN 0-571-17077-3.
- Butler, David; Adonis, Andrew; Travers, Tony (1994). Failure in British Government: The Politics of the Poll Tax. Oxford: Oxford University Press. ISBN 0-19-827876-4.
- Campbell-Smith, Duncan (2008). Follow the Money: The Audit Commission, Public Money and the Management of Public Services, 1983–2008. London: Allen Lane. ISBN 978-1-84614-068-6.
- Hatton, Derek (1988). Inside Left. London: Bloomsbury. ISBN 0-7475-0185-8.
- Grant, Malcolm (1986). Rate Capping and the Law (2nd ed.). London: Association of Metropolitan Authorities. ISBN 0-902052-06-3.
- Livingstone, Ken (1987). If Voting Changed Anything, They'd Abolish It. London: Collins. ISBN 0-00-217770-6.
- Loughlin, Martin (1996). Legality and Locality: The Role of Law in Central-Local Government Relations. Oxford: Oxford University Press. ISBN 0-19-826015-6.
- "Rates: Proposals for Rate Limitation and Reform of the Rating System" (Cmnd. 9008), Department of the Environment and Welsh Office, 1 August 1983.
- Taaffe, Peter; Mulhearn, Tony (1988). Liverpool – A City that Dared to Fight. Fortress Books. ISBN 1-870958-00-4.
