= John Hamilton (Liverpool) =

British politician (1922–2006)

John Hamilton (2 September 1922 – 14 December 2006) was a British politician. He was a member of the Labour Party and Leader of Liverpool City Council from 1983 to 1986.

== Municipal life ==
Hamilton was a lifelong bachelor and worked as a schoolteacher. He was a member of the Religious Society of Friends, known as the Quakers, also serving as a magistrate. First elected to the council in 1958, Hamilton became Leader of the Labour Group in 1974 replacing Bill Sefton. He led the council from 1976 to 1978, although with no majority he was often overturned by the Liberal and Conservative groups acting together. In 1978 Hamilton was briefly deposed as Labour group leader by Eddie Roderick when Labour lost power, but returned after a few weeks.

== 1980s leadership ==
He was a left-winger but was not a member of the Militant tendency who dominated the Liverpool Labour group at the time. However, as Militant rose Hamilton was allowed to retain the leadership as a figurehead from the left-wing non-Militant members to disguise the fact that real power lay with leading Militants including Deputy Leader Derek Hatton. Hamilton knew this, and remarked "When I die I will go to hell with Hatton because he will make it look like heaven." Although a quietly spoken man, at all times Hamilton acted according to his principles: it was for this that he was most respected by all on the left of the Labour Party. Hamilton stood firm in the wake of his council's financial struggle with the government, as one newspaper reported at the time:

‘Council leader Mr John Hamilton said there was a massive resolve to carry on the fight, which was not “just about pounds, shillings and pence. At the end of the day every man, woman, and child in this country must say whether they are on the side of humanity or on the side of capitalism which is destroying humanity. This is the fight which we are in and which we will win,” he said.’

After the Labour Party investigation had closed down the District Labour Party and began expulsions of Militant members of the City Council, Hamilton was replaced as Leader by Tony Byrne on 20 November 1986. Byrne was never a Militant member but had jointly led the budget fight with the government with Militant, Hamilton and others.

== Later life ==
Along with 46 other members of the council who had voted to set an illegal budget, Hamilton was surcharged and banned from office for five years in 1987. He retained some posts, including membership of the Liverpool Racial Equality Council. He was never expelled from the Labour Party, and remained popular, becoming Chairman of Liverpool Broadgreen Constituency Labour Party in 1987; however his attempts to regain a council seat were in vain. Interviewed later, Hamilton was unrepentant about his actions and declared that he would do the same again. In 2005 Hamilton declined the offer of being made an Honorary Alderman on the nomination of the Labour Group on Liverpool.

Political offices
Preceded by Bill Smyth	Leader of Liverpool City Council; 1976–1978	Succeeded by Trevor Jones

Political offices
Preceded by Trevor Jones	Leader of Liverpool City Council; 1983–1986	Succeeded by Tony Byrne
