= Princes Park (Liverpool ward) =

Electoral district of Liverpool

Coordinates: 53.392°N 2.972°W

- Princes Park ward within Liverpool
- Population: 8,221 (2021 census)
- Registered Electors: 4,696 (2023 election)
- Metropolitan borough: City of Liverpool
- Metropolitan county: Merseyside
- Region: North West
- Country: England
- Sovereign state: United Kingdom
- UK Parliament: Liverpool Riverside
- Councillors: Lucille Harvey (Labour Party)

Princes Park ward is a Liverpool City Council Ward in the Liverpool Riverside Parliamentary constituency.

== Background ==
The ward was created in 1895 and was within the Liverpool West Toxteth constituency. The ward was retained during the 1953 boundary review, before being merged with the Granby ward to form Granby Princes Park ward in 1973. The ward was re-created in the 2003 boundary review, and retained as a smaller ward electing one councillor in the 2022 review.

=== 2004 boundaries ===
2004 boundaries

The ward was reinstated for the 2004 Municipal elections taking the whole of the former Granby ward with part of the former Abercromby and Smithdown wards.

The population of the 2004 ward taken at the 2011 census was 17,104. That census showed the ward to be ethnically diverse, with a 53% white, 16% black, 9% asian and 10% mixed ethnicity population.

=== 2023 boundaries ===
The ward boundaries were changed in 2023 following a review by the Local Government Boundary Commission for England which decided that the existing 30 wards each represented by three Councillors should be replaced by 64 wards represented by 85 councillors with varying representation by one, two or three councillors per ward. The Princes Park ward was reformed as a single-member ward. The ward boundaries retained the eastern half of the 2004 ward, gaining a small part of the former Greenbank ward. It contains the parts of the Toxteth area, including the Granby Four Streets, Princes Road Synagogue as well as Princes Park itself.

The population of the ward at the 2021 census was 8,221.

== Councillors ==
| Election | Councillor | Councillor | Councillor |
|---|---|---|---|
| 2004 | Mohamed Ali (LD) | Alan Dean (Lab) | Gideon Ben-Tovim (Lab) |
| 2006 | Anna Rothery (Lab) | Alan Dean (Lab) | Gideon Ben-Tovim (Lab) |
| 2007 | Anna Rothery (Lab) | Alan Dean (Lab) | Gideon Ben-Tovim (Lab) |
| 2008 | Anna Rothery (Lab) | Alan Dean (Lab) | Tim Moore (Lab) |
| 2010 | Anna Rothery (Lab) | Alan Dean (Lab) | Tim Moore (Lab) |
| 2011 | Anna Rothery (Lab) | Alan Dean (Lab) | Tim Moore (Lab) |
| 2012 | Anna Rothery (Lab) | Alan Dean (Lab) | Tim Moore (Lab) |
| 2014 | Anna Rothery (Lab) | Alan Dean (Lab) | Tim Moore (Lab) |
| 2015 | Anna Rothery (Lab) | Alan Dean (Lab) | Tim Moore (Lab) |
| 2016 | Anna Rothery (Lab) | Alan Dean (Lab) | Tim Moore (Lab) |
| 2018 | Anna Rothery (Lab) | Alan Dean (Lab) | Tim Moore (Lab) |
| 2019 | Anna Rothery (Lab) | Tomas Logan (Lab) | Joanne Anderson (Lab) |
| 2021 | Anna Rothery (Ind) | Tomas Logan (Lab) | Lucille Harvey (Lab) |
WARD REFORMED
| 2023 | Lucille Harvey (Lab) | | |

indicates seat up for re-election after boundary changes.

indicates seat up for re-election.

indicates change in affiliation.

indicates seat up for re-election after casual vacancy.

- Following the resignation of Cllr Tim Moore a by-election was held on 17 October 2019; the winner Joanne Anderson was elected as the Mayor of Liverpool in May 2021.
- Former Lord Mayor of Liverpool Anna Rothery was shortlisted and subsequently removed from contention to be the Labour Party candidate for City Mayor and later resigned from the Labour Party to sit as an independent councillor on 23 November 2021.

== Election results ==
=== Elections of the 2020s ===
4th May 2023
| Party | Candidate | Votes | % | ±% |
|---|---|---|---|---|
| **Labour** | **Lucille Bernadette Harvey (Note: Lucille Harvey was a re-standing councillor for the former Princes Park ward.)** | **737** | **70.12** | |
| Green | Muryam Saffia Aminah Sheikh | 218 | 20.74 | |
| Liberal Democrats | Fiona McBride | 56 | 5.33 | |
| Conservative | Douglas Jardine Gaskarth | 40 | 3.81 | |
| Majority | | 519 | 49.38 | |
| Turnout | | 1,051 | 22.38 | |
| Registered electors | | 4,696 | | |
| Rejected ballots | | 11 | 1.04 | |
| Total ballots | | 1,062 | 22.62 | |
| Labour **win** (new seat) | | | | |

^{§}Lucille Harvey was a re-standing councillor for the former Princes Park ward.

Liverpool City Council Municipal Elections: 6th May 2021
| Party | Candidate | Votes | % | ±% |
|---|---|---|---|---|
| **Labour** | **Lucille Bernadette Harvey** | **2,373** | **73.37%** | **▼2.70** |
| Green | Muryam Saffia Aminah Sheikh | 604 | 17.91% | ▲4.15 |
| Liberal Democrats | Peter Joseph Rainford | 191 | 5.66% | ▼2.93 |
| Conservative | Beryl Pinnington | 138 | 4.09% | ▼0.50 |
| Majority | | 1,769 | 52.46% | ▼6.86 |
| Turnout | | 3,477 | 29.64% | ▲13.72 |
| Registered electors | | 11,731 | | |
| Rejected ballots | | 105 | 3.02% | ▲2.10 |
| Labour **hold** | | Swing | ▼3.42 | |

=== Elections of the 2010s ===
Princes Park by-election 17 October 2019
| Party | Candidate | Votes | % | ±% |
|---|---|---|---|---|
| Labour | **Joanne Marie Anderson** | 1,259 | 73.07% | ▲0.94 |
| Green | Stephanie Louise Pitchers | 237 | 13.76% | ▼4.59 |
| Liberal Democrats | Lee Rowlands | 148 | 8.59% | ▲3.20 |
| Conservative | Alma McGing | 79 | 4.59% | ▲1.56 |
| Majority | | 1,022 | 59.32% | ▲5.54 |
| Turnout | | 1,739 | 15.92% | ▼9.09 |
| Registered electors | | 10,921 | | |
| Rejected ballots | | 16 | 0.92% | ▼0.04 |
| Labour **hold** | | Swing | ▲2.77 | |

Liverpool City Council Municipal Elections: 2nd May 2019
| Party | Candidate | Votes | % | ±% |
|---|---|---|---|---|
| **Labour** | **Tomas Logan** | **1,926** | **72.13%** | **▼6.66** |
| Green | Stephanie Louise Pitchers | 490 | 18.35% | ▲5.66 |
| Liberal Democrats | Thomas Sebire | 144 | 5.39% | ▲0.93 |
| Conservative | Beryl Pinnington | 81 | 3.03% | ▼1.03 |
| Liberal | Barbara Lever | 29 | 1.09% | n/a |
| Majority | | 1,436 | 53.78% | ▼12.33 |
| Turnout | | 2,696 | 25.01% | ▼0.68 |
| Registered electors | | 10,778 | | |
| Rejected ballots | | 26 | 0.96% | |
| Labour **hold** | | Swing | ▼6.16 | |

Liverpool City Council Municipal Elections: 3rd May 2018
| Party | Candidate | Votes | % | ±% |
|---|---|---|---|---|
| **Labour** | **Anna Rothery** | **2,155** | **78.79%** | **▲11.23** |
| Green | Stephanie Louise Pitchers | 347 | 12.69% | ▼6.63 |
| Liberal Democrats | Thomas Sebire | 122 | 4.46% | ▼0.53 |
| Conservative | Beryl Pinnington | 111 | 4.06% | ▼0.64 |
| Majority | | 1,808 | 66.11% | ▲11.87 |
| Turnout | | 2,753 | 25.69% | ▼4.52 |
| Registered electors | | 10,715 | | |
| Rejected ballots | | 18 | 0.65% | ▼1.06 |
| Labour **hold** | | Swing | ▲8.93 | |

Liverpool City Council Municipal Elections 2016: 5th May 2016
| Party | Candidate | Votes | % | ±% |
|---|---|---|---|---|
| **Labour** | **Timothy Francis Moore** | **1,976** | **67.56%** | **▼0.67** |
| Green | Stephanie Louise Pitchers | 565 | 19.32% | ▼1.52 |
| Liberal Democrats | Leo Francis Evans | 146 | 4.99% | n/a |
| TUSC | Daren Andrew Ireland | 138 | 4.72% | ▲1.85 |
| Conservative | Alice Margaret Day | 100 | 3.42% | ▼0.74 |
| Majority | | 1,411 | 48.24% | ▲0.85 |
| Turnout | | 2,976 | 30.21% | ▼29.47 |
| Registered electors | | 9,851 | | |
| Rejected ballots | | 51 | 1.71% | ▲1.06 |
| Labour **hold** | | Swing | ▲0.42 | |

Liverpool City Council Municipal Elections 2015: 7th May 2015
| Party | Candidate | Votes | % | ±% |
|---|---|---|---|---|
| **Labour** | **Alan Dean** | **3,974** | **68.23%** | **▲1.14** |
| Green | Dee Coombes | 1,214 | 20.84% | ▲4.55 |
| Conservative | Alice Margaret Day | 242 | 4.16% | ▲0.15 |
| UKIP | Lewis Richard Joseph Donelan | 208 | 3.57% | n/a |
| TUSC | Daren Andrew Ireland | 167 | 2.87% | ▼2.17 |
| English Democrat | Steven Greenhalgh | 19 | 0.33% | n/a |
| Majority | | 2,670 | 47.39% | ▼3.41 |
| Turnout | | 5,824 | 59.68% | ▲29.05 |
| Registered electors | | 9,822 | | |
| Rejected ballots | | 38 | 0.65% | ▼0.19 |
| Labour **hold** | | Swing | ▼1.70 | |

Liverpool City Council Municipal Elections 2014: 22nd May 2014
| Party | Candidate | Votes | % | ±% |
|---|---|---|---|---|
| **Labour** | **Anna Rothery** | **1,890** | **67.09%** | **▼4.10** |
| Green | Simeon Daniel Hart | 459 | 16.29% | ▲0.09 |
| Independent politician | Frank Jones | 148 | 5.25% | n/a |
| TUSC | Daren Andrew Ireland | 142 | 5.04% | ▼0.93 |
| Conservative | Laura Watson | 113 | 4.01% | ▲0.15 |
| Liberal | Lindsey Janet Mary Wood | 65 | 2.31% | ▼0.47 |
| Majority | | 1,431 | 50.80% | ▼4.19 |
| Turnout | | 2,817 | 30.63% | ▼1.43 |
| Registered electors | | 9,274 | | |
| Rejected ballots | | 24 | 0.84% | ▼0.30 |
| Labour **hold** | | Swing | ▼2.10 | |

Liverpool City Council Municipal Elections 2012: 3rd May 2012
| Party | Candidate | Votes | % | ±% |
|---|---|---|---|---|
| **Labour** | **Tim Moore** | **1,920** | **71.19%** | **▼1.02** |
| Green | Elspeth Ruth Anwar | 437 | 16.20% | ▲4.87 |
| TUSC | Paul Frederick Humphreys | 161 | 5.97% | ▲2.65 |
| Conservative | Lucy Glover | 104 | 3.86% | ▼0.64 |
| Liberal | Paula Joan Davidson | 75 | 2.78% | ▲0.96 |
| Majority | | 1,483 | 54.99% | ▼5.89 |
| Turnout | | 2,728 | 29.20% | ▼3.94 |
| Registered electors | | 9,344 | | |
| Rejected ballots | | 31 | 1.14% | ▲0.57 |
| Labour **hold** | | Swing | ▼2.95 | |

Liverpool City Council Municipal Elections 2011: 5th May 2011
| Party | Candidate | Votes | % | ±% |
|---|---|---|---|---|
| **Labour** | **Alan William Dean** | **2,263** | **72.21%** | **▲18.77** |
| Green | Lewis Coyne | 355 | 11.33% | ▼1.04 |
| Liberal Democrats | Naz Islam | 214 | 6.83% | ▼18.39 |
| Conservative | Gwynneth Hicklin | 141 | 4.50% | ▼1.23 |
| TUSC | Paul Frederick Humphreys | 104 | 3.32% | n/a |
| Liberal | Karen Louise Williams | 57 | 1.82% | ▼1.42 |
| Majority | | 1,908 | 60.88% | ▲32.66 |
| Turnout | | 3,152 | 33.14% | ▼18.57 |
| Registered electors | | 9,512 | | |
| Rejected ballots | | 18 | 0.57 | |
| Labour **hold** | | Swing | 9.91% | |

Liverpool City Council Municipal Elections 2010: Princes Park
| Party | Candidate | Votes | % | ±% |
|---|---|---|---|---|
| Labour | Anna Rothery | 2,740 | 53.44% | ▲4.28 |
| Liberal Democrats | Mumin Khan | 1,293 | 25.22% | ▼3.39 |
| Green | Addullahi Yasin Mahamoud | 634 | 12.37% | ▼0.37 |
| Conservative | Diane Isabel Watson | 294 | 5.73% | ▼0.80 |
| Liberal | Thomas David Peel | 166 | 3.24% | ▲0.28 |
| Majority | | 1,447 | 28.22% | ▲7.67 |
| Turnout | | 5,127 | 51.71% | ▲27.45 |
| Registered electors | | 10,008 | | |
| Rejected ballots | | 48 | 0.93% | ▼0.36 |
| Labour **hold** | | Swing | ▲9.91 | |

=== Elections of the 2000s ===
Liverpool City Council Municipal Elections 2008: Princes Park
| Party | Candidate | Votes | % | ±% |
|---|---|---|---|---|
| **Labour** | **Timothy Moore** | **1,227** | **49.16%** | **▼1.80** |
| Liberal Democrats | Mumin Khan | 714 | 28.61% | ▲4.05 |
| Green | Rebecca Lawson | 318 | 12.74% | ▼1.23 |
| Conservative | Catherine Audrey Hirst | 163 | 6.53% | ▲0.72 |
| Liberal | Michael Alan Williams | 74 | 2.96% | ▼1.74 |
| Majority | | 513 | 20.55% | ▼5.85 |
| Turnout | | 2,513 | 24.26% | ▲1.50 |
| Registered electors | | 10,049 | | |
| Rejected ballots | | 17 | | |
| Labour **hold** | | Swing | ▼2.92 | |

Liverpool City Council Municipal Elections 2007: Princes Park
| Party | Candidate | Votes | % | ±% |
|---|---|---|---|---|
| **Labour** | **Alan Dean** | **1,193** | **50.96%** | **▲6.48** |
| Liberal Democrats | Mohamed Mahmood Ali | 575 | 24.56% | ▲0.33 |
| Green | Thomas Crone | 327 | 13.97% | ▲4.73 |
| Conservative | Audrey Hirst | 136 | 5.81% | ▲2.20 |
| Liberal | Neil King | 110 | 4.70% | ▼3.19 |
| Majority | | 618 | 26.21 | ▲5.96 |
| Turnout | | 2,375 | 22.93% | ▼1.24 |
| Registered electors | | 10,359 | | |
| Rejected ballots | | 17 | 0.72% | ▼0.11 |
| Labour **hold** | | Swing | ▲2.98 | |

Liverpool City Council Municipal Elections 2006: Princes Park
| Party | Candidate | Votes | % | ±% |
|---|---|---|---|---|
| **Labour** | **Anna Rothery** | **1,184** | **44.48%** | **▲9.98** |
| Liberal Democrats | Mohammed Mahmood Ali | 645 | 24.23% | ▼7.11 |
| Respect | Paul Manuel Desson | 281 | 10.56% | n/a |
| Green | Sophy Hansford | 246 | 9.24% | ▼4.84 |
| Liberal | Nina Clare Edge | 210 | 7.89% | n/a |
| Conservative | Alma Gavine McGing | 96 | 3.61% | ▼1.56 |
| Majority | | 539 | 20.25% | ▲17.10 |
| Turnout | | 2,662 | 24.17% | ▲8.45 |
| Registered electors | | 11,015 | | |
| Rejected ballots | | 22 | 0.83% | |
| Labour **gain** from Liberal Democrats | | Swing | ▲8.55 | |

After the boundary change of 2004 the whole of Liverpool City Council faced election. Three Councillors were returned.

Liverpool City Council Municipal Elections 2004: Princes Park
| Party | Candidate | Votes | % | ±% |
|---|---|---|---|---|
| **Labour** | **Gideon Ben-Tovim** | **1,029** | **34.50%** | Steady |
| **Labour** | **Alan Dean** | **1,026** | **34.39%** | Steady |
| **Liberal Democrats** | **Mohamed Ali** | **935** | **31.34%** | Steady |
| Labour | Suraj-Prakash Sharma | 891 | 29.87% | Steady |
| Liberal Democrats | Paul Twigger | 857 | 28.73% | Steady |
| Liberal Democrats | Nabil Sultan | 788 | 26.42% | Steady |
| Green | Anja Ploger | 420 | 14.08% | Steady |
| Green | Simon Holgate | 381 | 12.77% | Steady |
| Green | Justine Williams | 206 | 6.91% | Steady |
| Independent | Nina Edge | 173 | 5.80% | Steady |
| Conservative | Catherine Hirst | 154 | 5.16% | Steady |
| Majority | | 94 | 3.15 | Steady |
| Turnout | | 2,983 | 15.92% | |
| Labour **win** (new seat) | | | | |
| Labour **win** (new seat) | | | | |
| Liberal Democrats **win** (new seat) | | | | |

• italics denotes the sitting Councillor • bold denotes the winning candidate

== See also ==
- Liverpool City Council
- Liverpool City Council elections 1880–present
- Liverpool Town Council elections 1835 - 1879
