= Liam Robinson (politician) =

British politician (born 1982)

Councillor Liam Robinson

Leader of Liverpool City Council
- Incumbent
- Assumed office 17 May 2023
- Deputy: Daniel Barrington
- Preceded by: Office re-established Joe Anderson (2012)

Councillor for Kensington and Fairfield
- Incumbent
- Assumed office 2 May 2008
- Preceded by: Frank Doran
- Majority: 197 (3.8%)

Personal details
- Born: 1982 (age 43–44) Macclesfield, Cheshire, England
- Party: Labour Co-op
- Children: 2

Liam Robinson (born 1982) is a British Labour and Co-operative Party politician who has served as the leader of Liverpool City Council since the reestablishment of the position in May 2023.

Additionally as The City of Liverpool's representative to the Liverpool City Region Combined Authority, he holds the portfolio for innovation in the Mayor's cabinet.

== Career ==
Robinson was elected as a councillor for Kensington and Fairfield in 2008, succeeding Liberal Democrat councillor Frank Doran. He has since held various roles in the city, chairing Merseytravel and serving on the board of the Northern Powerhouse Partnership.

Robinson worked for Network Rail at Liverpool Lime Street railway station for sixteen years prior to becoming leader of Liverpool City Council.

=== Leader of Liverpool City Council ===
Robinson was elected as the Leader of Liverpool City Council's Labour group in November 2022, being formally elected as leader of the council in May 2023 following the Labour group gaining a majority of seats in the May 2023 local elections. In 2012, Liverpool's went for a mayoral system of a directly elected mayor. The mayor was abolished in 2023 with Robinson succeeding the last mayor Joanne Anderson.

Upon taking office, Robinson pledged to continue Anderson's work in addressing the 2021 government report into the council, which criticised its "severe breakdowns of governance". Additionally, he stated that he intended to build more homes in Liverpool and advocate for more devolution of power to Liverpool City Region.

As leader of the Liverpool City Council, a constituent council of the Liverpool City Region Combined Authority, Robinson also serves on the Mayor's Cabinet and since 2024 has been the Cabinet Member for Innovation.

== Personal life ==
Robinson is married with two children. He supports Manchester United F.C..
