= Richard Kemp (politician) =

British politician

Cllr Richard Kemp CBE
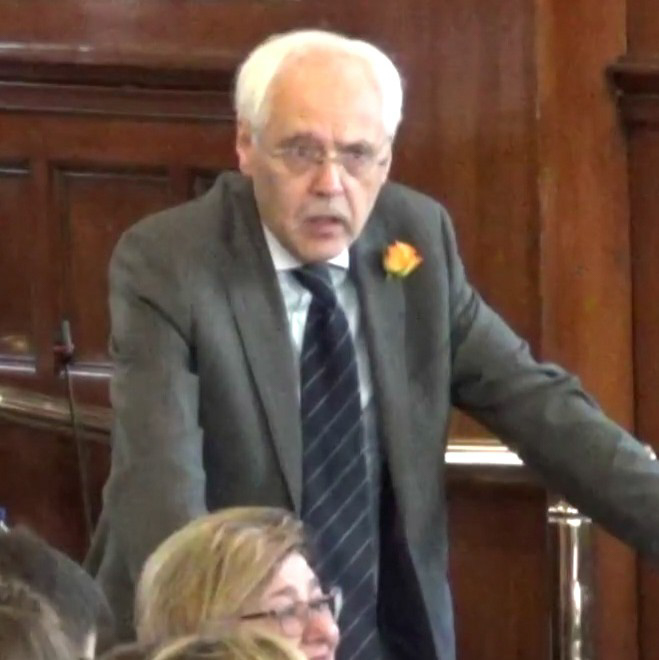

Lord Mayor of Liverpool
- In office 15 May 2024 – 14 May 2025
- Preceded by: Mary Rasmussen
- Succeeded by: Barbara Murray

Liverpool City Councillor for Penny Lane
- Incumbent
- Assumed office 4 May 2023
- Preceded by: Ward established

Leader of the Liberal Democrat Group on Liverpool City Council
- In office 4 May 2012 – 9 May 2023
- Preceded by: Paula Keaveney
- Succeeded by: Carl Cashman

Leader of the Liberal Democrat Group in the Local Government Association
- In office 5 May 2005 – 22 August 2011
- Preceded by: Chris Clarke
- Succeeded by: Gerald Vernon-Jackson

Personal details
- Born: January 1953 (age 73)
- Party: Liberal Democrat
- Spouse: Erica Kemp CBE
- Children: 3
- Website: Richard Kemp

Richard Charles Kemp CBE (born January 1953) is a British Liberal Democrat politician who has served as a councillor on Liverpool City Council since 1975. He was leader of the Liverpool Liberal Democrat group from 2012–23 and served as Lord Mayor of Liverpool from 2024–25. He has represented several wards on the council and has represented Penny Lane since 2023. Kemp has also held senior positions in the Local Government Association, has represented UK local government internationally, and was awarded a CBE in 2011.

== Early life ==
Born in London, he attended Balshaw's Grammar School in Leyland between 1964–71. Kemp's family had connections to Liverpool before he moved to the city in 1974. His mother was born in Walton, while his uncle owned a shop on Scotland Road. She left Liverpool in 1943 after meeting Kemp's father, who was serving at an RAF site in Lancashire. He was, for a period of time, an estate agent in Liverpool.

== Career ==
=== Liverpool City Council ===
He was the organiser for David Austick when the Liberals won the Ripon by-election in 1973, and first came to Liverpool in 1974 to work for David Alton. He was elected as a councillor on Liverpool City Council in May 1975 for the then St Michael's ward. He subsequently represented the Dingle, Picton and Church wards following successive boundary reorganisations. Kemp has represented Penny Lane since 2023, when he elected as the sole councillor for the newly created ward, receiving 1,123 votes (55.8%).

In May 2023, Kemp stood down as leader of the Liverpool Liberal Democrat group after 11 years in the position. When he became leader the group had declined from 60 councillors to 10, and subsequently to three in 2014 and two in 2015. Following the 2023 elections, the Liverpool Liberal Democrats increased their representation on the council to 15 councillors. He succeeded Paula Keaveney as group leader, and was followed by Carl Cashman.

Kemp stood as the Liberal Democrat candidate for Mayor of Liverpool in 2012, 2016 and 2021. In the 2016 poll, he finished second with 21.1% of the vote. He consistently opposed the directly elected mayoral system. Following a 2023 vote by Liverpool City Council to abolish the mayoralty, the system was replaced by a leader-and-cabinet model.

Kemp became Lord Mayor of Liverpool in May 2024, a one-year post, after serving for a year as Deputy Lord Mayor. His wife, Erica, served as Lady Mayoress during his term. His mayoral campaigns focused on the interests of disadvantaged children and care leavers.

Kemp has stood three times for election to the UK Parliament for the Liberal Democrats in the Liverpool Wavertree constituency, finishing second in 1997 with 21.5% of the vote, and third in both 2017 and 2019 – with 6.5% and 9.3% of the vote respectively.

=== Local Government ===
Between 2003–11, he served as a vice chair of the Local Government Association (LGA), and also served as the leader of the LGA Liberal Democrats Group between 2005–11. He has acted as LGA spokesperson on health and as international spokesperson for the four UK local government associations. Since 2000, he has worked in many councils for the Audit Commission and the LGA; inspecting, reviewing, supporting and mentoring in a wide range of councils of all types.

Between 2006–16, he was the UK representative on the executive bureau, finance board and world council of United Cities and Local Government, the global body for local government. After assisting with the rebuilding of the pan-African section of UCLG – UCLG Africa – between 2007–09, in 2010 he began advising on governance and scrutiny, covering both the work of councils and of local government associations.

== Other areas of focus ==
Kemp is chair of the Local Authority Mutual Investment Trust, which provides investment opportunities for local authorities and affiliated organisations. He is also chair of QS ImpACT, a global charity that works with universities, disadvantaged communities, NGOs and businesses to promote action towards the United Nations Sustainable Development Goals.

== Personal life and recognition ==
In the 2011 Birthday Honours, Kemp was appointed a Commander of the Order of the British Empire for public service and regeneration. He is married to Erica Kemp CBE, who served as a Liverpool city councillor for 23 years and was Lord Mayor of Liverpool over 2014–15. They are reportedly the only married couple to have both been awarded a CBE.
