= Anna Rothery =

Former Lord Mayor of Liverpool

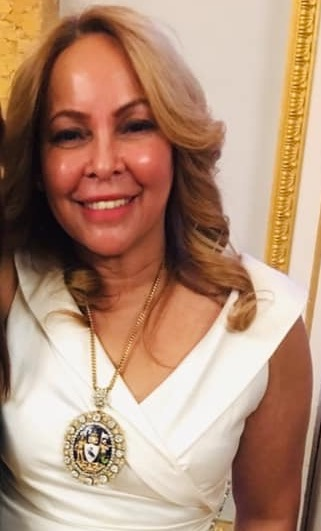

Lord Mayor of Liverpool
- In office September 2019 – 28 May 2021
- Preceded by: Peter Brennan
- Succeeded by: Mary Rasmussen

Liverpool City Councillor for Princes Park
- In office 4 May 2006 – 4 May 2023
- Preceded by: Mohamed Ali
- Majority: 1,808 (66.1%)

Personal details
- Born: Toxteth, Liverpool, England
- Party: Liverpool Community Independents
- Other political affiliations: Labour (until 2021)
- Education: University of Warwick; University of Liverpool; University of Chester; University of Newcastle
- Website: annarothery.wordpress.com

Anna Rothery is a British politician who served as the Lord Mayor of Liverpool from September 2019 to May 2021.

== Early life ==
Rothery is a daughter of Bernadette and Hubert George Rothery. She was born and raised at Belvidere Road in the city of Liverpool in the 1950s.

Anna's father died when she was a child and her mother had to take care of Anna and her three siblings.

Rothery was educated at Granby Street Primary School, St Silas Junior School, and Paddington Comprehensive School. She studied sociology, psychology and law at University. She earned a master's degree in Business and Regeneration.

== Career ==
Since 2006, Rothery has represented the Princes Park ward in the Parliamentary constituency of Liverpool Riverside.

From 2010 to 2013, she was the Chair of the Culture, Tourism and Sport select committee in Liverpool.

Rothery became the first councillor of Liverpool to speak at the United Nations in Geneva on Religious, Linguistic and Cultural differences in 2012. She is the North West Ambassador for the British Institute for Human Rights, and is a member of various different groups, such as Merseyside Common Purpose and Operation Black Vote, a scheme which aims to get more Black, Asian and minority ethnic people into politics. She is the Programme Coordinator for Migrant Workers North West.

=== Lord Mayor of Liverpool ===
In September 2019, Rothery became the first black Lord Mayor in the history of the city of Liverpool after her predecessor resigned. This is a civic role and is bestowed on the individual by the city's Mayor, rather than being an elected role. During her term as Lord Mayor, Anna fundraised for local charities, including Anthony Walker Foundation, LCR Pride Foundation and Merseyside Somali Association.

=== Candidacy for Mayor of Liverpool ===
In 2021, she was shortlisted as one of three candidates to be the Labour Party's candidate for Mayor of Liverpool, alongside former deputy mayor Ann O'Byrne and acting mayor Wendy Simon, following the announcement by incumbent Joe Anderson that he would not run for re-election. On 14 February 2021, Rothery announced via Twitter that, if elected, she would campaign to scrap the mayoral model in Liverpool. O'Byrne and Simon also announced that they intended to campaign to scrap the mayoral model.

On 17 February, Rothery, Simon and O'Byrne were told that they would be reinterviewed, sparking claims of a stitch-up by the Labour Party establishment. Six days later, all three were scrapped as candidates and told not to reapply. In a statement, Rothery said: "I welcomed the deviation last week from the formal National Executive Committee process to include more scrutiny of candidates but not to remove transparency and accountability from the process. I hope party HQ sees the outrage its decision has caused across our city and the harm it is doing to our party's reputation and changes course. If the decision stands, then I will be left with no choice but to challenge it legally."

On 6 March, Rothery announced that she was suing the Labour Party. The case was rejected and she was ordered to pay £65,000 to cover Labour's legal costs. Rothery said she was disappointed with the outcome.

=== Post Labour Party ===
On 23 November 2021 she announced her resignation from the Labour Party due to the national leadership "failing in its duty to effectively oppose the government's attacks on our people" and being "more interested carrying out internal party vendettas than standing up for our people, our black community and our LGBTQIA community". She indicated her intention to remain as an Independent member of Liverpool Council.

From 2022 to 2023 Rothery was the registered leader of the political party "Liverpool Community Independents", standing down after being named in as one of the Liverpool City Council councillors found to have evaded their parking fines.
