= Joanne Anderson =

Mayor of Liverpool from 2021 to 2023

2nd Mayor of Liverpool
- In office 10 May 2021 – 5 May 2023
- Deputy: Jane Corbett
- Preceded by: Joe Anderson
- Succeeded by: Office abolished Liam Robinson as Leader of Liverpool City Council

Liverpool City Councillor for Princes Park
- In office 17 October 2019 – 7 May 2021

Personal details
- Born: 7 January 1971 (age 55) Liverpool, England
- Party: Labour
- Children: 1
- Education: Liverpool John Moores University

Joanne Marie Anderson (born 7 January 1971) is a British Labour Party politician who served as the second and final directly elected Mayor of Liverpool from 2021 to 2023. She previously served as the Liverpool City Councillor for the Princes Park ward from October 2019 to May 2021. She was the first woman to be Mayor of the city and the first black woman to be a directly elected mayor in the UK. Anderson left office in May 2023 at the end of her term.

== Early life ==
Anderson was born in Liverpool in 1971. She has said that growing up under Margaret Thatcher's government made her feel like she was "at the bottom of the pile" and that she would not "amount to much".

Anderson left school at 16 with no qualifications, but completed a degree in Business Studies as a mature student. She completed a BA in business studies at Liverpool John Moores University between 1996 and 1999, and is currently completing an MBA at the same university.

Anderson has had a career as an equality, diversity and inclusion practitioner and a business consultant.

== Career ==
Anderson's worked as a civil servant for the Crown Prosecution Service for over a decade. She also worked as a business consultant and has worked as an advisor and a member of the board of trustees for various organisations, including Emmaus Merseyside (a charity providing work and housing to homeless people in the UK), Merseyside Probation Service, and Merseyside Equality and Employment Law. She was elected as a councillor for the Princes Park ward in a by-election in October 2019 with 73% of the vote, and has served on the Education and Children's Services Select Committee.

Anderson launched the first Black-led social enterprise in Liverpool and after leaving politics, the first Black-led social traders network.

=== Mayor of Liverpool ===
Anderson became Labour's candidate for Mayor of Liverpool following the announcement by incumbent Mayor Joe Anderson (no relation) that he would not run for re-election following his arrest in December 2020. She became the party's candidate after the selection process re-opened and the three initial candidates (Acting Mayor Wendy Simon, Lord Mayor Anna Rothery, and former Deputy Mayor Ann O'Byrne) were barred from running. She was elected Mayor of Liverpool with 59.2% of the vote in a second round of voting, since she failed to secure 50% of the votes in the first round. She is the first black woman to be a directly elected Mayor in the UK and vowed to develop a strategy supporting ending violence against women and girls and implement the recommendations of the Caller Report, which highlighted "serious failings" in the city council's leadership.

In 2022 a public consultation was held regarding Liverpool City Council's leadership model. Despite public support for the Mayoral model, the council voted to scrap the role and move to a leader and cabinet system. The role of Mayor of Liverpool was abolished and in the 2023 Liverpool City Council election Anderson did not stand for election.

== Personal life ==
Anderson described herself as a single mother of a teenage boy in 2018, and has said that she has faced bankruptcy twice. She has called herself a "proud black, working-class Scouser who loves our city and its people".

Anderson is a fan of City of Liverpool FC, citing her preference for the team over either of the city's two most famous teams (Liverpool FC and Everton FC) because it is "community owned and operated" and represents unity within the city, in contrast to the rivalry between Liverpool and Everton. Referencing the team's trademark colour, which combines the colours of Liverpool and Everton, she tweeted, "We are a proud footballing city with a rich and historic affiliation to the sport. Mix blue with red, you get purple."

In 2025, she appeared in the second series of the Channel 4 reality series The Jury: Murder Trial.
