= Penny Lane (Liverpool ward) =

Metropolitan borough council ward in Liverpool, England

- Penny Lane ward within Liverpool
- Population: 4,723 (2023 electorate)
- Metropolitan borough: City of Liverpool
- Metropolitan county: Merseyside
- Region: North West
- Country: England
- Sovereign state: United Kingdom
- UK Parliament: Liverpool Garston
- Councillors: Richard Kemp (Liberal Democrat)

Penny Lane ward is an electoral district of Liverpool City Council within the Liverpool Garston Parliamentary constituency.

== Background ==
=== 2023 ward ===
The ward was created for the elections held on 4 May 2023 following a 2022 review by the Local Government Boundary Commission for England, which decided that the previous 30 wards each represented by three Councillors should be replaced by 64 wards represented by 85 councillors with varying representation by one, two or three councillors per ward. The Penny Lane ward was created as a single-member ward from the western part of the former Church ward and a part of the former Greenbank ward. The ward boundaries follow Smithdown Road, Allerton Road, Rose Lane and the West Coast Main Line. The ward includes, and is named for, Penny Lane made famous by the Beatles single of the same name.

== Councillors ==
Election	Councillor
2023	Richard Kemp CBE (LD)

indicates seat up for re-election after boundary changes.

indicates seat up for re-election.

indicates change in affiliation.

indicates seat up for re-election after casual vacancy.

== Election results ==
=== Elections of the 2020s ===
4th May 2023
Party	Candidate	Votes	%	±%
Liberal Democrats	Richard Kemp (Note: Richard Kemp was a re-standing councillor for the former Church ward.)	1,123	55.08	
Labour	Anthony Edward Haimes	596	29.23	
Green	Ted Grant	245	12.02	
Independent	Susie Stalsberg	56	2.75	
Conservative	John Walker	19	0.93	
Majority		527	25.85	
Turnout		2,039	43.17	
Rejected ballots		6	0.29	
Total ballots		2,045	43.30	
Registered electors		4,723		
Liberal Democrats win (new seat)				
