= Coat of arms of Liverpool =

English coats of arms, granted 1797

- Armiger: Liverpool
- Adopted: 1797
- Crest: On a Wreath of the Colours a Cormorant the wings elevated in the beak a Branch of Laver proper.
- Shield: Argent a Cormorant in the beak a Branch of Seaweed called Laver all proper
- Supporters: On the dexter Neptune with his Sea-Green Mantle flowing the waist wreathed with Laver on his head an Eastern Crown Gold in the right hand his Trident Sable the left supporting a Banner of the Arms of Liverpool on the sinister a Triton wreathed as the dexter and blowing his Shell the right hand supporting a Banner thereon a Ship under sail in perspective all proper the Banner Staves Or.
- Motto: Deus Nobis Haec Otia Fecit

The coat of arms of Liverpool consists of a liver bird holding a seaweed in its beak in a white background. The arms and crest were granted by the College of Arms on March 22, 1797, and the supporters were granted the next day, on March 23.

The motto — Deus Nobis Haec Otia Fecit — is Latin for "God hath granted us this ease". The liver bird has since been the symbol of Liverpool, being used in the arms of Liverpool, New South Wales, coat of arms of Paul McCartney, and the crest of Liverpool FC.

== Design ==
=== Blazon ===
The blazon of the arms goes as follows:

Arms: Argent, a cormorant, in the beak a branch of seaweed called Laver, all proper;

Crest: On a wreath of the colours a cormorant, the wings elevated, in the beak a branch of laver proper;

Supporters: The dexter, Neptune, with his sea-green mantle flowing, the waist wreathed with laver, on his head an Eastern crown gold, in the right hand his trident sable, the left supporting a banner of the arms of Liverpool; on the sinister, a Triton wreathed as the dexter and blowing his shell, the right hand supporting a banner, thereon a ship under a sail in perspective all proper, the banner staves or;

=== Symbolism ===
The shield consists of a liver bird on a white background, and the supporters are Triton and Neptune. The motto is Deus Nobis Haec Otia Fecit which is Latin for God hath granted us this ease.

== History ==
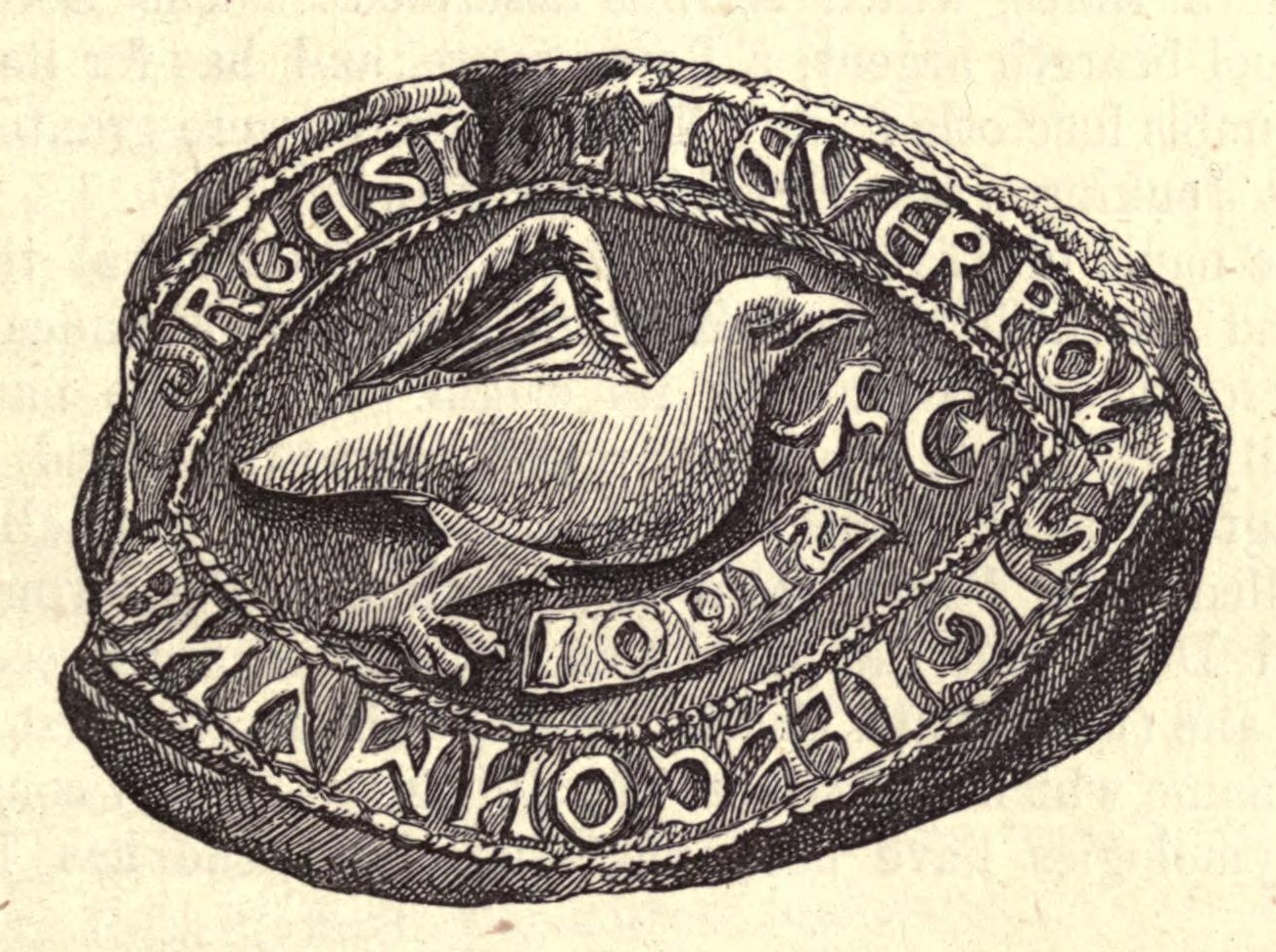
The former seal of Liverpool originating from 1229.

Liverpool was founded by King John in 1207, and the town was given a charter by the king in 1229, which gave the town the right to use his seal as the city's own. The oldest surviving impression of the seal originates from 1532. It featured an eagle holding a spring of broom in its beak. Under the bird was the word JOHIS on a scroll, an abbreviation of Johannis translating to John's in English. The sprig of broom, or planta genista, was the symbol of the royal house of the Plantagenets. The seal also features a star and a crescent, one of King John's badges. The eagle was a symbol of John the Evangelist, the person whom King John is named after.

In 1664, the seal had mostly been forgotten, and began to be referred to as a lever or as a cormorant. Holme Randle describes the arms as a blue lever on a silver field. The word originates from an adaptation of the German loffler or Dutch lepler/lefler, both referring to the spoonbill. The spring of broom was modified to a branch of laver, probably originating from the city's name. Around the same time, the broom sprig in the bird's beak was reinterpreted as a branch of laver, also on account of the similarity of the word to the city's name.

In 1796, the then mayor of Liverpool Clayton Tarleton wrote to the College of Arms to request a grant of coat of arms. The arms and the crest were granted on March 22, 1797, by Sir Isaac Heard, Garter King of Arms, and George Harrison, Norroy King of Arms. The next day, on March 23, the College of Arms granted supporters to the city.

== Use ==
The arms of Paul McCartney.

The liver bird on the crest has since been a symbol of Liverpool. Paul McCartney, who was born in Liverpool, was granted arms in 2001. The crest — which contains a liver bird inspired by the arms of Liverpool — is blazoned as follows:

On a Wreath of the Colours A Liver Bird calling Sable supporting with the dexter claws a Guitar Or stringed Sable;

The crest of Liverpool F.C. — a football club based in the city — contains a red liver bird inspired by the arms. It was first mentioned in 1892 and was initially simply the coat of arms of the city. The present-day crest was first added to the kit in 1950 during the FA Cup final of that year. The liver bird can also be seen on the arms of Liverpool, New South Wales, symbolizing the English ancestry of the region.
