= Kensington and Fairfield (Liverpool ward) =

Metropolitan borough council ward in England

Coordinates: 53.413°N 2.971°W

Kensington & Fairfield Kensington (1895–2003)
- Kensington & Fairfield ward within Liverpool
- Population: 19,585 (2021 census)
- Registered Electors: 11,617 (2023 election)
- Metropolitan borough: City of Liverpool
- Metropolitan county: Merseyside
- Region: North West
- Country: England
- Sovereign state: United Kingdom
- UK Parliament: Liverpool Wavertree
- Councillors: Liz Parsons (Labour); Liam Robinson (Labour); Wendy Simon (Labour)

Kensington & Fairfield ward is an electoral division of Liverpool City Council in the Liverpool Wavertree Parliamentary constituency. The ward contains the Kensington and Fairfield areas of Liverpool.

== Background ==
The ward was established in 1895 as Kensington ward and was renamed as Kensington & Fairfield following the 2003 local government boundary review.

=== 1953 ward boundary ===
1953 Kensington ward

The ward boundaries of Liverpool were changed in 1953.

The Kensington ward was largely unchanged from its previous iteration with only minor changes to better reflect the contemporary arrangement of the streets.

=== 1980 ward boundary ===
1980 Kensington ward

The ward boundary was changed for the 1980 elections. A report of the Local Government Boundary Commission for England published in November 1978 set out proposals for changes to the wards of Liverpool City Council, maintaining the number of councillors at 99 representing 33 wards. Kensington & Fairfield ward was represented by three councillors.

The report describes the boundaries of Kensington ward as "Commencing at a point where West Derby Road meets Farnworth Street, thence northeastwards along said West Derby Road to Boundary Lane, thence northwestwards along said lane to the southern boundary of Breckfield Ward, thence northeastwards along said boundary to the southwestern boundary of Anfield Ward, thence southeastwards along said boundary, generally southeastwards along the southwestern boundary of Tuebrook Ward and eastwards along the southern boundary of Tuebrook Ward to the southwestern boundary of Old Swan Ward, thence southeastwards along said boundary to the Edge Hill to Huyton railway line, thence southwestwards along said railway to Wavertree Road, thence northwestwards along said road to Botanic Road, thence northwestwards along said road to Edge Lane, thence generally southwestwards along said lane to Jubilee Drive, thence northwards along said drive and Farnworth Street to the point of commencement".

=== 2004 ward boundary ===
2004 Kensington & Fairfield ward

The ward boundary was changed for the 2004 elections following a 2003 boundary review which saw the ward retain most of the former Kensington ward and small parts of the former Smithdown and Tuebrook wards.

The population of the 2004 ward taken at the 2011 census was 15,377, and at the 2021 census 16,522.

=== 2023 ward boundary ===
The ward boundaries were changed in 2023 following a review by the Local Government Boundary Commission for England which decided that the existing 30 wards each represented by three Councillors should be replaced by 64 wards represented by 85 councillors with varying representation by one, two or three councillors per ward. The Kensington and Fairfield ward remained a three-member ward. The ward boundaries retained most of the 2004 ward, losing a portion to the new Everton East ward, and gaining parts of the former Central and Tuebrook and Stoneycroft wards.

The population of the ward at the 2021 census was 19,585.

== Councillors ==
Election	Councillor	Councillor	Councillor
2004	James Kendrick (LD)	Richard Marbrow (LD)	Frank Doran (LD)
2006	Louise Baldock (Lab)	Richard Marbrow (LD)	Frank Doran (LD)
2007	Louise Baldock (Lab)	Wendy Simon (Lab)	Frank Doran (LD)
2008	Louise Baldock (Lab)	Wendy Simon (Lab)	Liam Robinson (Lab)
2010	Louise Baldock (Lab)	Wendy Simon (Lab)	Liam Robinson (Lab)
2011	Louise Baldock (Lab)	Wendy Simon (Lab)	Liam Robinson (Lab)
2012	Louise Baldock (Lab)	Wendy Simon (Lab)	Liam Robinson (Lab)
2014	Sue Heron (Lab)	Wendy Simon (Lab)	Liam Robinson (Lab)
2015	Sue Heron (Lab)	Wendy Simon (Lab)	Liam Robinson (Lab)
2016	Sue Heron (Lab)	Wendy Simon (Lab)	Liam Robinson (Lab)
2018	Sue Walker (Lab)	Wendy Simon (Lab)	Liam Robinson (Lab)
2019	Sue Heron (Lab)	Wendy Simon (Lab)	Liam Robinson (Lab)
2021	Sue Heron (Lab)	Wendy Simon (Lab)	Liam Robinson (Lab)
WARD REFORMED
2023	Liz Parsons (Lab)	Wendy Simon (Lab)	Liam Robinson (Lab)

indicates seat up for re-election after boundary changes.

indicates seat up for re-election.

indicates change in affiliation.

indicates seat up for re-election after casual vacancy.

== Election results ==
=== Elections of the 2020s ===
4th May 2023
Party	Candidate	Votes	%	±%
**Labour**	**Liz Parsons (Note: Liz Parsons was a re-standing councillor for the former Norris Green ward.)**	**1,574**	**24.76**	
**Labour**	**Liam Robinson (Note: Liam Robinson was a re-standing councillor for the former Kensington & Fairfield ward.)**	**1,539**	**24.21**	
**Labour**	**Wendy Simon (Note: Wendy Simon was a re-standing councillor for the former Kensington & Fairfield ward.)**	**1,444**	**22.71**	
Green	Radoslaw Maciej Chmiel	429	6.75	
Liverpool Community Independents	Stephen James Faragher	402	6.32	
Liberal Democrats	Cassandra Gabriel	294	4.62	
Liberal Democrats	James Fisher	289	4.55	
Independent	Joe Owens	221	3.48	
Conservative	Beryl Pinnington	166	2.61	
Majority		1,145		
Turnout				
Rejected ballots		9		
Registered electors		11,617		
Labour **win** (new seat)				
Labour **win** (new seat)				
Labour **win** (new seat)				

6th May 2021
Party	Candidate	Votes	%	±%
**Labour**	**Liam Robinson**	**1,580**	**67.21**	**▼2.33**
Green	Samuel James Cassidy	263	11.19	▲4.68
Liberal Democrats	Anna Clare Martin	178	7.57	▲0.07
Liberal	Damien Patrick Daly	175	7.44	▲3.55
Conservative	Luke Andrew Hingley-Smith	155	6.59	▲3.97
Majority		1,317	56.02	▼5.98
Turnout		2,351	25.03	▼1.72
Registered electors		9,392		
Rejected ballots		56	2.33	▲1.77
Total ballots				
Labour **hold**		Swing	-3.51	

=== Elections of the 2010s ===
Liverpool City Council Municipal Elections 2019: 2nd May 2019
Party	Candidate	Votes	%	±%
**Labour**	**Wendy Simon**	**1,484**	**69.54%**	**▼6.54**
UKIP	Thomas Paul Kangley	161	7.54%	N/A
Liberal Democrats	Pat Moloney	160	7.50%	▲2.77
Green	Rebecca Lawson	139	6.51%	▼1.19
Liberal	Damien Patrick Daly	83	3.89%	▲0.96
Conservative	Brian James Jones	56	2.62%	▼1.04
Independent	Joe Owens	51	2.39%	▼2.52
Majority		1,323	62.00%	▼6.37
Turnout		2,146	23.31%	▼1.67
Registered electors		9,206		
Rejected ballots		12	0.56%	▲0.09
Labour **hold**		Swing	N/A	

Liverpool City Council Municipal Elections 2018: 3rd May 2018
Party	Candidate	Votes	%	±%
Labour	**Sue Walker**	1,768	76.08%	▲5.09
Green	Steve Faragher (Note: Steve Faragher was forced to resign from the Green Party on 30 April after making disablist comments on social media; however, he remained on the ballot paper as the Green Party candidate. "Candidate who resigned from Green party apologises but is still standing...for the Green party". Liverpool Echo.)	179	7.70%	▲1.56
Independent	Joe Owens	114	4.91%	N/A
Liberal Democrats	Bill Barrow	110	4.73%	▼0.97
Conservative	Pauline Shuttleworth	85	3.66%	▲1.75
Liberal	Damien Patrick Daly	68	2.93%	▼0.37
Majority		1,589	68.37%	▲7.96
Turnout		2,335	24.98%	▼3.61
Registered electors		9,347		
Rejected ballots		11	0.47%	
Labour **hold**		Swing	▲1.76	

Liverpool City Council Municipal Elections 2016: 5th May 2016
Party	Candidate	Votes	%	±%
Labour	**Liam John Robinson**	1,745	70.99%	+1.7%
UKIP	Thomas Paul Kangley	260	10.58%	−0.61%
Green	Steve Faragher	151	6.14%	−2.48%
Liberal Democrats	Bill Barrow	140	5.70%	+1.50%
Liberal	Michele Leigh Williams	81	3.30%	+1.81%
Conservative	Pauline Shuttleworth	47	1.91%	5.48%
TUSC	Priyanga Jeyanayagam	34	1.38%	−0.25%
Majority		1,485	60.41%	+2.31%
Registered electors		8,673		
Turnout		2480	28.59%	−28.20%
Labour **hold**		Swing	1.16%	

Liverpool City Council Municipal Elections 2015: 7th May 2015
Party	Candidate	Votes	%	±%
Labour	**Wendy Simon**	3,528	69.29%	1.44%
UKIP	Thomas Paul Kangley	570	11.19%	−6.72%
Green	Stephen Faragher	570	8.62%	+3.03%
Liberal Democrats	Bill Barrow	214	4.20%	+0.43%
Conservative	Holly Nicole Boyd	182	3.57%	+1.68%
TUSC	Jimmy Tyson	83	1.63%	+0.11%
Liberal	Shelley Williams	46	1.49%	+0.01%
Majority		2,958	58.10%	
Registered electors		8,967		
Turnout		5,117	56.79%	+8.16%
Labour **hold**		Swing	4.08%	

Liverpool City Council Municipal Elections 2014: 22nd May 2014
Party	Candidate	Votes	%	±%
Labour	**Sue Heron**	1,834	67.85%	−10.01%
UKIP	Michael John Lane	484	17.91%	n/a
Independent	Stephen Faragher	151	5.59%	n/a
Liberal Democrats	Bill Barrow	102	3.77%	−1.98%
Conservative	Ben Hachula	51	1.89%	−0.48%
TUSC	Dave Jones	41	1.52%	−2.52%
Liberal	Brenda Edwards	40	1.48%	−3.34%
Majority		1,350	49.94%	−22.17%
Turnout		2,703	30.41%	−0.18%
Labour **hold**		Swing		

Liverpool City Council Municipal Elections 2012: 3rd May 2012
Party	Candidate	Votes	%	±%
Labour	**Liam Robinson**	2,099	77.86%	+1.56%
Liberal Democrats	Rebekah Elizabeth Lindeman	155	5.75%	−0.28%
Green	Esther Ruth Cosslett	139	5.16%	+1.46%
Liberal	Karen Louise Williams	130	4.82%	−0.18%
TUSC	Neville Jones	109	4.04%	n/a
Conservative	Lucy Jane McKinstry	64	2.37%	−0.54%
Majority		1,944	72.11%	+1.87%
Turnout		2,696	30.59%	−2.77%
Labour **hold**		Swing	+0.92%	

Liverpool City Council Municipal Elections 2011: 5th May 2011
Party	Candidate	Votes	%	±%
Labour	**Wendy Ann Simon**	**2228**	**76.30%**	+14.25%
UKIP	Frank Dunne	177	6.06%	n/a
Liberal Democrats	Kevin White	176	6.03%	−22.98%
Liberal	John James Joseph McNulty	146	5.00%	+2.75%
Green	Esther Ruth Cosslett	108	3.70%	−0.07%
Conservative	Andy Carpenter	85	2.91%	−0.01%
Majority		2051	70.24%	+37.21%
Turnout		2920	33.36%	−20.10%
Labour **hold**		Swing	18.62%	

Liverpool City Council Municipal Elections 2010: Kensington and Fairfield
Party	Candidate	Votes	%	±%
Labour	**Louise Baldock**	**2949**	**62.05%**	
Liberal Democrats	Francis Joseph Doran	1379	29.01%	
Green	Michael Ryan	179	3.77%	
Conservative	Ann Nugent	139	2.92%	
Liberal	Shelley Harrison	107	2.25%	
Majority		1570	33.03%	
Turnout		4753	53.46%	
Labour **hold**		Swing		

=== Elections of the 2000s ===
Liverpool City Council Municipal Elections 2008: Kensington and Fairfield
Party	Candidate	Votes	%	±%
Labour	**Liam John Robinson**	**1411**	**47.88%**	
Liberal Democrats	Francis Joseph Doran	1214	41.19	
Green	Janet Louise Bunn	144	4.89%	
Conservative	Nigel Stuart Barber	93	3.16%	
Liberal	Karen Williams	85	2.88%	
Majority				
Turnout		2947	31.22%	
Labour **gain** from Liberal Democrats		Swing		

Liverpool City Council Municipal Elections 2007: Kensington and Fairfield
Party	Candidate	Votes	%	±%
Labour	**Wendy Simon**	**1289**	**45.68%**	
Liberal Democrats	Richard Marbrow	1237	43.83%	
BNP	Jane Greenhalgh	128	4.54%	
Green	Paula Ann Rice	106	3.76%	
Conservative	John Astley Watson	62	2.20%	
Majority				
Turnout		2822	30.19%	
Labour **gain** from Liberal Democrats		Swing		

Liverpool City Council Municipal Elections 2006: Kensington and Fairfield
Party	Candidate	Votes	%	±%
Labour	**Louise Baldock**	**1127**	**45.04%**	
Liberal Democrats	Jimmy Kenrick	955	38.17%	
Liberal	Elizabeth Susan Pascoe	180	7.19%	
Green	Paula Ann Rice	152	6.08%	
Conservative	Francis Dunne	88	3.52%	
Majority				
Turnout		2502	24.16%	
Labour **gain** from Liberal Democrats		Swing		

After the boundary change of 2004 the whole of Liverpool City Council faced election. Three Councillors were returned.

Liverpool City Council Municipal Elections 2004: Kensington and Fairfield
Party	Candidate	Votes	%	±%
Liberal Democrats	**Frank Doran**	**1528**		
Liberal Democrats	**Richard Marbrow**	**1346**		
Liberal Democrats	**James Kendrick**	**1321**		
Labour	Michael Fox	1155		
Labour	James Noakes	1082		
Labour	Francis Steer	1022		
Socialist Labour	Michael Lane	257		
Liberal	Karen Williams	217		
Liberal	Damien Daly	192		
Liberal	James Richardson	177		
Conservative	Francis Dunne	117		
Majority				
Turnout		3177	29.61%	
Liberal Democrats **hold**		Swing	n/a	

• italics - Denotes the sitting Councillor.
• bold - Denotes the winning candidate.
