= Royal prerogative of mercy =

Royal prerogative of the monarch to grant pardons

In the English and British tradition, the royal prerogative of mercy is one of the historic royal prerogatives of the British monarch, by which they can grant pardons (informally known as a royal pardon) to convicted persons. The royal prerogative of mercy was originally used to permit the monarch to withdraw, or provide alternatives to, death sentences; the alternative of penal transportation to "partes abroade" (lands overseas) was used since at least 1617. It is now used to change any sentence or penalty. A royal pardon does not overturn a conviction.

In modern times, by constitutional convention, the prerogative is exercised by the Sovereign on ministerial advice. Those responsible for recommending its exercise are:

- the Secretary of State for Justice within England, Wales, and the Channel Islands
- the Secretary of State for Defence for offences under military law
- the Lieutenant governor of the Isle of Man within the Isle of Man
- Scottish Ministers within Scotland
- the Secretary of State for Northern Ireland within Northern Ireland for reserved matters, and the Justice Minister for Northern Ireland for devolved matters.

In Commonwealth realms other than the United Kingdom, the prerogative is exercised by the country’s governor-general on behalf of the Sovereign, on the advice of government ministers. In federations such as Australia and Canada, the prerogative is also exercised at the state or provincial level by the governors (Australia) and lieutenant governors (Canada), also acting on ministerial advice: the Attorneys-General in Australia, and the federal and provincial cabinets in Canada, in respect of federal and provincial offences.

In the case of Derek Bentley, involving a miscarriage of justice, a court found that this royal prerogative power is "probably" entirely a matter of policy, and thus not justiciable.

== Forms of mercy ==
=== Free pardons ===
Free pardons release a person from the effect of a penalty or a consequence of a sentence, but they do not quash or overturn the conviction, which remains after the pardon. They were traditionally used where new evidence demonstrated conclusively that no crime was committed or that the individual did not commit the offence, but the expansion of rights of appeal have reduced the need for free pardons, particularly since appeals have the power to quash the original conviction and provide a presumption of innocence. The most recent free pardons were granted to Michael Shields (2009) and, posthumously, to Alan Turing (2013).

=== Conditional pardons ===
Conditional pardons substitute one type of sentence for another, and were often used to substitute a lesser sentence for the death penalty. An example of this was in the Isle of Man in 1972 when Queen Elizabeth II, the Lord of Mann, commuted the death sentence of a man to life imprisonment. The abolition of the death penalty and the increase in the rights of appeal have meant this pardon is rarely used. Posthumous uses of the conditional pardon include Derek Bentley (1993) and Ruth Ellis (2026).

=== Special remissions ===
Special remissions, also called remission pardons, reduce the effect of a sentence, by releasing a prisoner from having to serve some or all of the remainder of their sentence in custody, but the sentence itself remains unaltered. Special remissions are normally granted on compassionate grounds (although there are now statutory powers available), after an offender provides information to help bring other offenders to justice after they have been convicted (however this is now partly covered by section 74 of the Serious Organised Crime and Police Act 2005), to recognize remarkably good conduct in custody, such as the prevention of escape, injury, or death, or to remedy an incorrectly calculated release date.

== History and procedure ==
Use of the royal prerogative of mercy (RPM) is exercised by the sovereign, under the advice of his ministers. The sovereign pledges to administer "Justice in Mercy" in the coronation oath. The last monarch who attempted to use the RPM on his own initiative was King George IV, who favored mercy in many cases. George wished to commute death sentence for a defendant in Clare who had burned his own house; the king backed down after Home Secretary Sir Robert Peel threatened to resign. Capital sentences passed at the Old Bailey were once reviewed by the ‘grand cabinet' at Privy Council meetings, but this practice ended so that cases of "an unnamable character" would not be discussed in Queen Victoria's presence.

Pardons are given by warrant under the royal sign-manual. In England and Wales, notices of the use of the free pardons are, by convention, given to the Clerk of the Crown in Chancery, who seals them and arranges for notice to be published in the London Gazette. Conditional pardons and special remissions are not noticed in the London Gazette. Uses of the RPM in Northern Ireland are not customarily published in the Belfast Gazette.

== Statistical data ==
In 2001, BBC News reported that only six UK prisoners were granted special remission in an average year.

Use of the royal prerogative of mercy diminished after the Criminal Cases Review Commission was established in 1997, creating an alternate route for review of possible flawed decisions in criminal prosecutions.

== Use in Northern Ireland ==
In a 2014 response to a parliamentary question, the Northern Ireland Office (NIO) reported that the royal prerogative of mercy was used more than 365 times in Northern Ireland between 1979 and 2002; there were no records for the period 1987 and 1997, as those were lost. The vast majority were not related to terrorism, but an unknown number were granted to members of paramilitaries or security forces. In 2015, the NIO disclosed that sixteen Irish republicans were granted royal pardons between 2000 and 2002. Recipients included Sinn Féin's Gerry Kelly, who was granted an RPM after he was captured in the Netherlands in 1986, to which he had fled after escaping in 1983 from Maze Prison, where he was serving a sentence for his participation in the IRA's 1973 Old Bailey bombing. The Dutch government would not extradite him on the basis of existing convictions, so he was granted a pardon so the Netherlands would extradite him to face charges related to the escape.

== Examples in Britain ==
In 1717, King George I's Proclamation for Suppressing of Pirates was issued, promising a general pardon to those pirates who surrendered to the authorities.

In 1884 Queen Victoria exercised the royal prerogative to commute the death sentences of Thomas Dudley and Edwin Stephens to imprisonment for six months due to the circumstances of their crime.

In 1980 sisters Dolours and Marian Price were given the royal prerogative.

In 2001 two inmates at HMP Prescoed, South Wales, were released 28 days early, under the prerogative of mercy, as a reward for saving the life of the manager of the prison farm when he was attacked and gored by a captive wild boar.

In 2013 a posthumous free pardon was awarded to Alan Turing under the prerogative of mercy. Turing, an important World War II codebreaker, had been convicted in 1952 of gross indecency for a consensual homosexual relationship with an adult.

In 2020, the royal prerogative of mercy was used to reduce the minimum tariff that must be served before Steven Gallant could be considered for release on parole. Gallant, who was serving life imprisonment for murder, was granted this reduction in sentence "in recognition of his exceptionally brave actions at Fishmongers' Hall, which helped save people's lives despite the tremendous risk to his own" while confronting terrorist Usman Khan during the 2019 London Bridge attack.

== Other Commonwealth countries ==
=== Australia ===
In Australia, the Governor-General acts on the advice of the Attorney-General or Minister for Justice, and may only exercise the prerogative of mercy in relation to a federal offender convicted of a Commonwealth offence. The pardon may be a full pardon (said to be a free, absolute and unconditional pardon), a conditional pardon, a remission or partial remission of a penalty, or the ordering of an inquiry. Each state and territory (apart from the Australian Capital Territory, which only provides for an inquiry) has also enacted legislation providing for the reconsideration of convictions or sentences.

=== Canada ===
In Canada the royal prerogative of mercy is established in Letters Patent of the Governor General acting on behalf of the Monarch, who consistent with constitutional convention may grant pardons on the advice of a cabinet minister. In practice, Section 748 of the Criminal Code gives the Governor in Council (i.e. cabinet) the power to exercise the prerogative, which is the preferred approach. The process is administered by the Parole Board of Canada. As Canada has a record suspension process, the royal prerogative is only exercised cases where there is substantial injustice or undue hardship. It is rarely granted: between fiscal years 2013–2014 and 2017–2018 there were only two requests for clemency under the prerogative granted, compared to over 9,000 record suspensions or pardons granted under legislative powers in fiscal year 2017–2018 alone.

=== New Zealand ===
In New Zealand, the prerogative of mercy is exercised by the Governor-General, as the King's representative, with the power being delegated by the Letters Patent 1983. The Governor-General will act on the advice of the Minister of Justice, and has the power to grant a pardon, refer a case back to the courts for reconsideration, and to reduce a person's sentence.

In 2013, Scott Watson was refused a pardon by Sir Jerry Mateparae under the prerogative of mercy, following advice from the then-Minister of Justice Judith Collins. Kristy McDonald QC was appointed by the government in 2009 to review the evidence, and recommended to the government that there was a lack of new evidence to warrant an exercise of the prerogative of mercy.

In 2020 Andrew Little set up the Criminal Review Commission to review potential miscarriages of justice, as the threshold for the royal prerogative of mercy was deemed to be too high and other avenues to avoid miscarriages of justice were needed. Also in 2020, David Tamihere was granted the prerogative of mercy and his case was referred to the Court of Appeals to be reheard.

=== Malaysia ===
The King of Malaysia has executive power to grant royal pardons. A high-profile example is the pardon of politician Anwar Ibrahim, who had been jailed for sodomy, by Muhammad V of Kelantan after the 2018 Malaysian general election.
