= Conviction of Michael Shields =

British criminal case

The conviction of Liverpool F.C. supporter Michael Shields resulted from the attempted murder of Bulgarian citizen Martin Georgiev on 30 May 2005 with a paving slab in the Black Sea resort of Golden Sands, Bulgaria, following Liverpool F.C.'s 2005 UEFA Champions League win. Shields was arrested and subsequently convicted for the attack. Shields launched two appeals against his conviction amid a high-profile campaign, in 2005 and 2006, but they both failed and the original verdict was affirmed. His prison term was reduced from 15 to 10 years after the second appeal – but with an increase in fine. With parole, he would have been due for release in 2010.

On 9 September 2009 Justice Secretary Jack Straw granted Shields a full Royal Pardon, citing evidence that had only recently been brought to his attention. However, Straw refused to announce details about the new evidence. Shields became the first British citizen to be granted such a pardon after being convicted overseas. The Ministry of Justice of Bulgaria has requested the official documents for the Pardon and the evidence on which it is based from the British government.

== Incident ==
According to some witness accounts, a group of around ten Liverpool F.C. football fans, including Shields, engaged in a drunken fracas in the seaside resort in the early hours of the morning. When Georgiev came out of the cafe in which he worked as a barman to investigate, he was knocked down, kicked and punched repeatedly by at least three people. While he was lying on the ground, the questioned witness accounts claim Shields struck him on the head with an object. Shields and three other men, Bradley Thompson, Graham Sankey and Anthony Wilson, were arrested and charged with the attack.

Thompson and Wilson were convicted of lesser offences and given non-custodial sentences. Sankey was released without charge. Back in the UK, he 'confessed' to being the attacker, not Shields; Sankey later retracted his statement. Nine witnesses, both Bulgarian and British, later testified at the trial and many of them — including Georgiev himself — positively identified Shields (in an identity parade and in the court) as a person present at the crime scene and as the perpetrator of the crime.

A thorough review of witness accounts, together with the opportunity to interview Shields and a number of key witnesses, was undertaken by the author and playwright Kevin Sampson and led to a feature published in British Sunday broadsheet The Observer in June 2007.

== Justice campaign ==
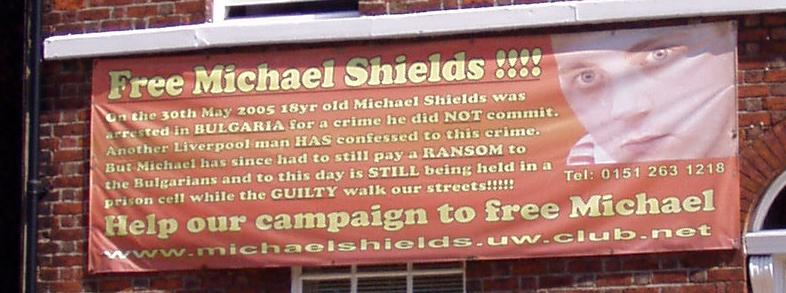
A poster on Shields' house campaigning for his release.

Following Shields' conviction on 26 July 2005, a vocal campaign in his support was launched in Liverpool, backed by many fans of Liverpool F.C. Shields's supporters branded the Bulgarian court decision 'unfair' and proclaimed him to be innocent. Belief in his innocence was stated by prominent faith and political leaders in the city of Liverpool, and by the then editors of the city's two newspapers. In particular, the campaign group was supported by the Leader of the Labour group on Liverpool City Council, Councillor and former Mayor Joe Anderson, who is not a supporter of Liverpool F.C. but rather is a season ticket-holder at local rivals Everton F.C.

After hearing of Shields' arrest in Bulgaria, Graham Sankey, another English football fan present at the scene but now back in the UK, confessed to attacking Georgiev. The court refused to acknowledge Sankey's confession unless he returned to Bulgaria or agreed to appear in a British courtroom for questioning, via video connection, by a Bulgarian court. Sankey was not prepared to do this and subsequently retracted his confession. The confession itself did not match any of the facts determined by the investigation, including an inaccurate description of the attack weapon. It has also been reported that Sankey's confession was not given freely but was the result of threats against him and his family.

The campaigners organised public events to promote their cause, including displaying a live "Free Michael" mosaic spanning an entire stand at Liverpool's first home game of the 2005–2006 season against Sunderland. This mosaic demonstration was repeated before a match against West Ham United in the 2008–2009 season, where the Kop stand formed a mosaic forming a "Free Michael Now" banner. The Shields campaign was subsequently criticised by the FA, who chose to take no action against the club for breaking FIFA rules on political protest.

Following the second appeal, the Bulgarian Supreme Court accused the UK and the campaign to free Shields of undermining the image of its judicial system during the trial by "selective reporting of only part of the information...this aimed at compromising the Bulgarian court system by creating a wrong idea of whether Bulgaria is a state committed to the rule of law". This had been exemplified when on 18 April 2006 the incident was covered in the ITV documentary The Forgotten Fan. The documentary was criticised for showing bias toward Shields, and utilising selective reporting.

== Appeals ==
Shields conducted two unsuccessful appeals under Bulgarian jurisdiction in 2005 and 2006 on procedural grounds relating to the original trial. The 2006 appeal saw his prison sentence cut from 15 to 10 years, but his fine increased to £71,000 and his challenge for a retrial denied. No new evidence was introduced during the appeal and the facts of the original case were supported by existing evidence. The testimony of a number of friends of Shields and the confession of Graham Sankey were dismissed as being biased towards helping to free Shields regardless of facts, inconsistent and inaccurate with Sankey incorrectly describing the weapon used in the attack as a paving slab (...a stone with irregular shape and not a pavement slab... according to police forensic reports).

Following Bulgaria's accession to the EU on 1 January 2007, Shields again launched an appeal against his conviction at the European Court of Human Rights in Strasbourg, again on procedural grounds on the allegation that his rights were violated during his trial and conviction in Bulgaria. The court found against Shields, and he was returned to the UK to serve the remainder of his sentence. No court found any fault in police or judicial process - under both European and Bulgarian law - related to Shields's arrest, detention, trial and conviction that warranted a retrial.

== Return to Britain ==
On 19 August 2006 it was reported in the British press that Shields would soon be allowed to return to Britain to serve the remainder of his sentence after part of the court-imposed £90,000 compensation had been paid to the victim, with the remainder to be transferred in future monthly installments. On 23 November 2006, Shields returned to the UK and was placed in HMP Hindley in Wigan. The Bulgarian authorities subsequently affirmed that the UK had the right to pardon Shields on 26 April 2008, however Shields was not pardoned by the UK authorities with Justice Minister Jack Straw refusing a pardon on the grounds that such an action was beyond his authority. This was challenged in the High Court by supporters of Shields, with the ruling on 17 December 2008 in which the court considered "that the Secretary of State does have a power under Article 12 of the Convention to consider at least granting pardon to Michael Shields". Straw has stated after the ruling that a lawyer will be appointed to see if any grounds for a pardon exist, and how a pardon would affect the legal rights and status of British prisoners abroad.

On 2 July 2009, Shields had an appeal for a pardon provisionally refused by Justice Secretary Jack Straw.

A statement issued by the Ministry of Justice said:

Following a detailed and careful consideration of all the relevant evidence the Justice Secretary Jack Straw has made a provisional decision that the application for a free pardon from Mr Michael Shields should be refused.

Mr Straw has made his decision in accordance with the High Court judgment of 17 December 2008 which indicated that, in order to grant a free pardon, he would have to be satisfied that Mr Shields was morally and technically innocent.

Shields' legal team was given four weeks by the Ministry of Justice to present new evidence for consideration before a final decision was made.

As a result, the third Westminster Hall Adjournment Debate secured by Louise Ellman MP was held on 15 July 2009, which set out the great concern over the safety of the conviction and the technical framework within which Straw had refused the pardon. Straw subsequently met again with the Shields family on 28 August 2009 at Blackburn Town Hall.

== Police and MoJ memoranda ==
According to an initial memo, released under Freedom of Information requests, on 25 March 2008 by the head of Merseyside police Brian McNeill to Jack Straw, it was stated that if evidence from an unidentified witness (Witness A) allegedly identifying an alternative suspect to Shields has not been submitted to Bulgarian courts, then – on presumptive legal equivalence between UK and Bulgarian law – Shields might have been able to appeal against his conviction and apply for release on bail during the appeal process (although for attempted murder, remand is presumed more likely). The memo also states the opposing case – that if the court system in Bulgaria had considered the evidence of Witness A, and that the conviction of Shields should stand, a pardon would require "further deliberation". Further, it stated that should the conviction of Shields be overturned in Bulgaria, that Merseyside police would render "all assistance formally requested [from the Bulgarian police] in dealing with [Graham] Sankey" who had made and then retracted a public confession to the crime, As Sankey retracted his confession and refused to return to Bulgaria to be interviewed by police or appear in court, it was inadmissible as evidence there. The memo states that Graham Sankey, Anthony Wilson and Bradley Thompson "refused to cooperate entirely with Merseyside police during the inquiry". No explicit identification of Witness A was made in the police report.

However, a later memo on 1 May 2009 after discussion with QC David Perry and Tim Jewill, head of the criminal law team at the Ministry of Justice, Brian McNeill "accepted the decision of the Bulgarian courts is to be treated as final and the legal process regarding any appeal by Shields in that country (Bulgaria) has been exhausted", whilst expressing the opinion that had Shields's defence presented the evidence of Witness A for consideration that in the UK "this case would now be referred back to the court of appeal or to the criminal case review commission." Such an interpretation has been seized as evidence of Shields' "innocence" by his supporters. The reasons that Shields' defence did not present the evidence of Witness A, and the nature, validity and presence of that evidence has not been made clear.

== Release ==
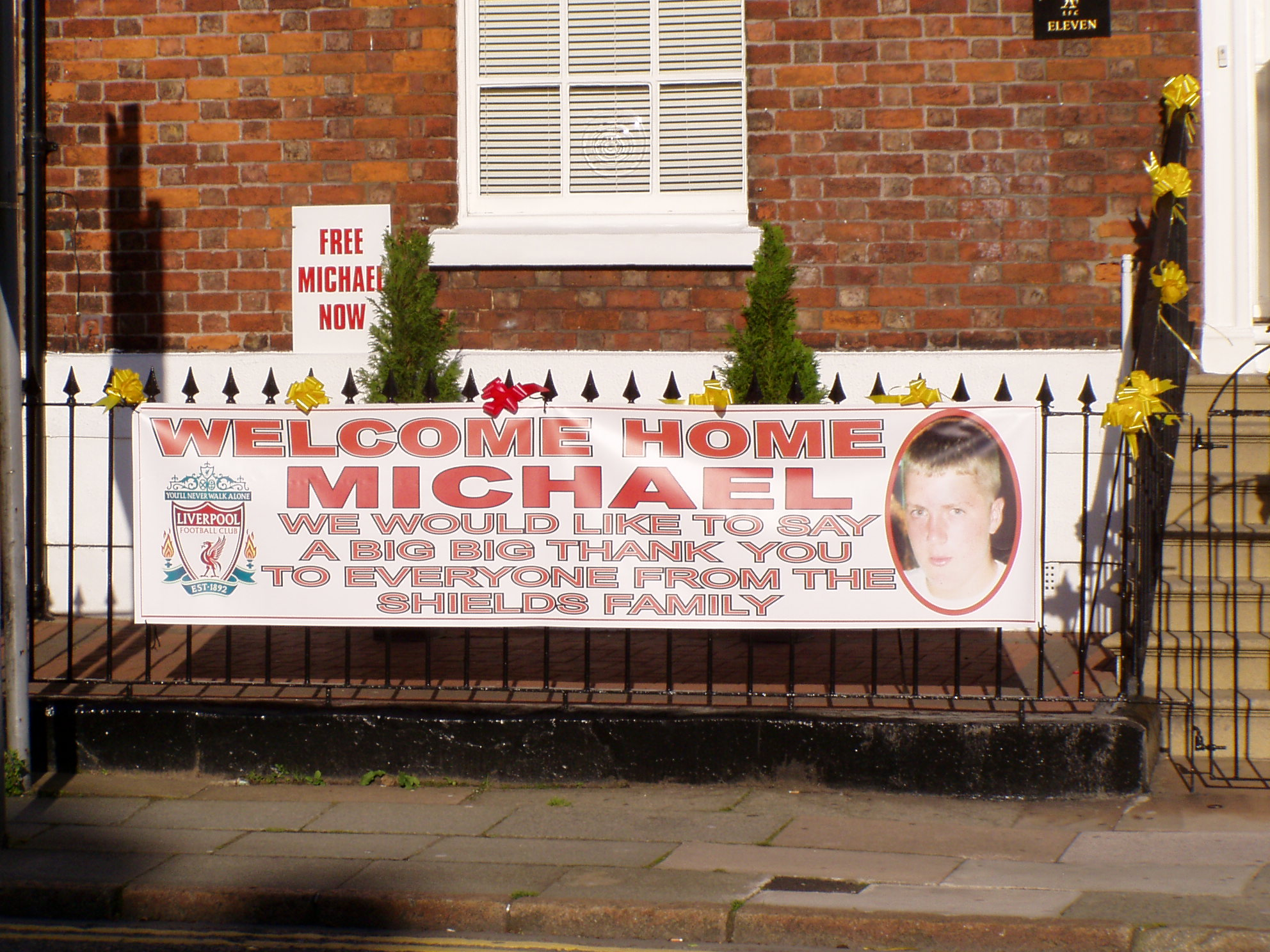
Sign outside Michael Shields's house on the day of his release

On 9 September 2009, Shields was given a royal pardon and released. His solicitor John Weate said: "I have spoken to Michael and he has been told that Jack Straw has granted a royal pardon. He was informed of the decision by the governor this morning. He was ecstatic and I'm delighted that an innocent man is finally being freed."

== Controversy ==
There was significant controversy at the time concerning the Royal Pardon issued to Shields. The then Home Secretary Jack Straw refused to explain the reasoning for the pardon, stating "I will not set out all the evidence that has come to light. Suffice it to say that there is very good reason to believe I was being told the truth." The use of the word 'evidence' is particularly tenuous as it is thought the only evidence presented to Straw was verbal 'evidence' submitted by Shields' family and Graham Sankey possibly under duress. A friend of Sankey alleged

When Sankey turned up to speak with Kirwan [the Shields family's solicitor] he was absolutely terrified. He was with his family and they just said they had received serious threats on members of the family and Graham. All Kirwan got was, "I want to say something in public because I am under great pressure, I am in fear of my life." Kirwan didn't get a confession out of him. Kirwan was not at all happy that Sankey was really admitting it. So he took it upon himself to make Sankey's statement ambiguous. He did it like that so he could then tear it to pieces if necessary later. It was not worth the paper it was written on.
