= Everton East (Liverpool ward) =

Metropolitan borough council ward in England

- Everton East ward within Liverpool
- Population: 4,184 (2023 electorate)
- Metropolitan borough: City of Liverpool
- Metropolitan county: Merseyside
- Region: North West
- Country: England
- Sovereign state: United Kingdom
- UK Parliament: Liverpool Riverside
- Councillors: Ellie Byrne (Labour)

Everton East ward is an electoral district of Liverpool City Council within the Liverpool Riverside Parliamentary constituency.

The ward was created for the elections held on 4 May 2023 following a 2022 review by the Local Government Boundary Commission for England, which decided that the previous 30 wards each represented by three Councillors should be replaced by 64 wards represented by 85 councillors with varying representation by one, two or three councillors per ward. The Everton East ward was created as a single-member ward from the eastern half of the former Everton ward and parts of the former Anfield and Kensington & Fairfield wards. The ward boundaries follow Everton Road, Breck Road, behind Sedley Street, Belmont Grove, Belmont Road, Sheil Road and Boaler Street. The ward includes the Liverpool Olympia.

== Councillors ==
| Election | Councillor |
|---|---|
| 2023 | Ellie Byrne (Lab) |

indicates seat up for re-election after boundary changes.

indicates seat up for re-election.

indicates change in affiliation.

indicates seat up for re-election after casual vacancy.

== Election results ==
=== Elections of the 2020s ===
4th May 2023
| Party | Candidate | Votes | % | ±% |
|---|---|---|---|---|
| Labour | Ellie Byrne^{§} | 652 | 74.86 | |
| Independent | Olivia Gill | 130 | 14.93 | |
| Green | Helen Seymour | 89 | 10.22 | |
| Majority | | 522 | 59.93 | |
| Turnout | | 871 | 20.82 | |
| Rejected ballots | | 5 | 0.57 | |
| Total ballots | | 876 | 20.93 | |
| Registered electors | | 4,184 | | |
| Labour win (new seat) | | | | |

^{§}Ellie Byrne was a re-standing councillor for Everton ward.
