= Wendy Simon =

Acting Mayor of Liverpool from 2020 to 2021

Mayor of Liverpool
- Acting, De facto
- In office 10 December 2020 – 10 May 2021
- Deputy: Herself
- Preceded by: Joe Anderson
- Succeeded by: Joanne Anderson

Deputy Mayor of Liverpool
- In office May 2018 – 10 May 2021
- Mayor: Joe Anderson; Herself (Acting)
- Preceded by: Ann O'Byrne
- Succeeded by: Jane Corbett

Liverpool City Councillor for Kensington and Fairfield
- Incumbent
- Assumed office 3 May 2007
- Preceded by: Richard Marbrow (LD)
- Majority: 1,323 (62.0%)

Personal details
- Party: Labour
- Children: 1
- Website: wendyformayor.org.uk

Wendy Simon is a Labour Party politician who exercised the powers and duties of the office of Mayor of Liverpool from 2020 to 2021. Mayor Joe Anderson temporarily stepped aside in December 2020. Although Anderson formally remained as Mayor until the end of his term, Simon performed Anderson’s duties. She also served as Deputy Mayor of Liverpool from 2018 to 2021.

== Career ==
A senior social worker in Knowsley, and a Unison union official, Simon has been a councillor for Kensington and Fairfield on Liverpool City Council since 2007. She is a trustee of the Everyman Playhouse, Liverpool.

In 2021, she was shortlisted as one of three candidates to be the Labour Party's candidate for Mayor of Liverpool, alongside former Deputy Mayor Ann O'Byrne and Lord Mayor of Liverpool Anna Rothery, following the announcement by incumbent Joe Anderson that he would not run for re-election. Simon and the other shortlisted candidates were subsequently told that they would be reinterviewed, sparking claims of a stitch-up by the Labour Party establishment. Afterwards all three were dismissed as candidates and told not to reapply.
