= Smithdown (Liverpool ward) =

Ward of the Liverpool City Council, in England

- Smithdown ward within Liverpool
- Population: 8,124 (2023 electorate)
- Metropolitan borough: City of Liverpool
- Metropolitan county: Merseyside
- Region: North West
- Country: England
- Sovereign state: United Kingdom
- UK Parliament: Liverpool Wavertree
- Councillors: James Roberts (Labour Party); Jon Morris (Labour Party)

Smithdown ward is an electoral district of Liverpool City Council within the Liverpool Wavertree constituency.

== History ==
The ward was created in 1953 within the Liverpool Edge Hill constituency. The boundaries were altered in 1973 and 1980. The ward was dissolved in 2004 reinstated in 2023.

=== 1980 Boundaries ===
1980 boundaries

A report of the Local Government Boundary Commission for England published in November 1978 set out proposals for changes to the wards of Liverpool City Council, maintaining the number of councillors at 99 representing 33 wards. Smithdown ward was represented by three councillors.

The report describes the boundaries as "Commencing at a point where Upper Parliament Street meets the eastern boundary of Abercromby Ward, thence generally northwestwards along- said boundary to the southeastern boundary of Everton Ward, thence northwards and generally northeastwards along said boundary to the western boundary of Kensington Ward, thence southwards, eastwards and southeastwards along said boundary to Wavertree Road, thence northwestwards along said road to Tunnel Road, thence southwards along said road to Spekeland Road, thence northeastwards along said road to Acton Street, thence southwards along said street to Lindley Street, thence southwestwards along said street to Earle Road, thence southeastwards along said road to Tunstall Street, thence southwestwards along said street to Smithdown Road, thence northwestwards along said road and Smithdown Lane to Upper Parliament Street, thence generally westwards along said street to the point of commencement".

=== 2004 boundaries ===
A report of the Local Government Boundary Commission published in March 2003 recommended the number of wards in the city be reduced to 30 and the number of councillors reduced to 90. The Smithdown ward was dissolved and distributed into the new Picton, Kensington and Fairfield, and Central wards.

=== 2023 boundaries ===
A 2022 review by the Local Government Boundary Commission for England decided that the existing 30 wards each represented by three Councillors should be replaced by 64 wards represented by 85 councillors with varying representation by one, two or three councillors per ward. The Smithdown ward was re-established as a smaller ward from a section of the previous Greenbank and Picton wards. The new ward is roughly bounded by the West Coast Main Line, Cranborne Road and Smithdown Road. The ward is represented by two councillors.

== Councillors ==
Election	Councillor	Councillor	Councillor
1980	Ernest Stephenson (Lib)	Joseph Clitherow (Lib)	Anne Clitherow (Lib)
1982	Alex Gamble (Lab)	Joseph Clitherow (Lib)	Anne Clitherow (Lib)
1983	Alex Gamble (Lab)	Steve Jenkins (Lab)	Anne Clitherow (Lib)
1984	Alex Gamble (Lab)	Steve Jenkins (Lab)	Dorothy Matthews (Lab)
1986	Alex Gamble (Lab)	Steve Jenkins (Lab)	Dorothy Matthews (Lab)
1987	Juliet Herzog (Lab)	I Templeman (Lab)	Judith Nelson (Lab)
1988	Juliet Herzog (Lab)	I Templeman (Lab)	D Bermingham (Lab)
1990	Juliet Herzog (Lab)	I Templeman (Lab)	D Bermingham (Lab)
1991	Juliet Herzog (Lab)	M. Clarke (Lab)	D Bermingham (Lab)
1992	Juliet Herzog (Lab)	M. Clarke (Lab)	W. Barrow (LD)
1994	Nev Bann (Lab)	M. Clarke (Lab)	W. Barrow (LD)
1995	Nev Bann (Lab)	M. Clarke (Lab)	W. Barrow (LD)
1996	Nev Bann (Lab)	M. Clarke (Lab)	Richie White (Lab)
1998	Gary Airey (LD)	M. Clarke (Lab)	Richie White (Lab)
1999	Gary Airey (LD)	Andrew Makinson (LD)	Richie White (Lab)
2000	Gary Airey (LD)	Andrew Makinson (LD)	Juli Sames (LD)
2002	Richie White (Lab)	Andrew Makinson (LD)	Juli Sames (LD)
2003	Richie White (Lab)	Andrew Makinson (LD)	Juli Sames (LD)
2004 - 2022 WARD DISESTABLISHED
2023	James Roberts (Lab)	Jon Morris (Lab)	

indicates seat up for re-election after boundary changes.

indicates seat up for re-election.

indicates change in affiliation.

indicates seat up for re-election after casual vacancy.

== Election results ==
=== Elections of the 2020s ===
4th May 2023 - 2 seats
Party	Candidate	Votes	%	±%
Labour	James Roberts^{[a]}	1,211	37.38	
Labour	Jon Morris	1,020	31.48	
Green	Thomas Watts	414	12.78	
Independent	Dave Cummings^{[b]}	399	12.31	
Liberal Democrats	Angela Hulme	144	4.44	
Conservative	Harry Gallimore-King	52	1.60	
Majority		797	22.13	
Turnout				
Rejected ballots		10		
Total ballots				
Registered electors		8,124		
Labour win (new seat)				
Labour win (new seat)				

==== Notes ====
a. James Roberts was a re-standing councillor representing Greenbank ward.
b. Dave Cummings was a re-standing councillor representing the Wavertree ward. He was affiliated with the Liberate Liverpool movement.

=== Elections of the 2000s ===
1st May 2003
Party	Candidate	Votes	%	±%
Liberal Democrats	Andrew Makinson	893	57.65	▲21.60
Labour	Richard Keenan	495	321.96	▼17.63
Green	Simon Holgate	89	5.75	▲3.79
Liberal	John Moore	40	2.58	▲0.14
Conservative	Grahame Harden	32	2.07	▲0.81
Majority		398	25.69	▲12.17
Turnout		1,549	18.5	
Liberal Democrats hold		Swing	19.61	

2nd May 2002
Party	Candidate	Votes	%	±%
Labour	Richard White	711	49.58	▲11.17
Liberal Democrats	Gary Airey	517	36.05	▼18.76
Independent	Michael Lane	125	8.72	
Liberal	John Moore	35	2.44	▼2.18
Green	Simon Holgate	28	1.95	▼0.21
Conservative	Kenneth Watkin	18	1.26	
Majority		194	13.53	▼2.88
Turnout		1,434		
Labour gain from Liberal Democrats		Swing	14.97	

4th May 2000
Party	Candidate	Votes	%	±%
Liberal Democrats	Juli Sames	558	54.81	▲3.15
Labour	Richie White	391	38.41	▼1.42
Liberal	M. A. Williams	47	4.62	▼0.80
Conservative	K. G. Watkin	22	2.16	
Majority		167	16.40	▲4.57
Turnout		1,018		
Liberal Democrats gain from Labour		Swing	2.29	

=== Elections of the 1990s ===
6th May 1999
Party	Candidate	Votes	%	±%
Liberal Democrats	Andrew Makinson	668	51.66	▲0.69
Labour	R. Keenan	515	39.83	▲0.53
Liberal	J. Moore	70	5.41	▼0.35
Conservative	J. Cole	28	2.17	
Ward Labour	L. Evans	12	0.93	▼3.04
Majority		153	11.83	▲0.16
Turnout		1,293		
Liberal Democrats gain from Labour		Swing	0.08	

7th May 1998
Party	Candidate	Votes	%	±%
Liberal Democrats	Gary Airey	681	50.97	▲27.98
Labour	Nev Bann	525	39.30	▼23.24
Liberal	M. Williams	77	5.76	▼8.70
Ward Labour	V. Marsland	53	3.97	
Majority		156	11.68	▼27.87
Turnout		1,336		
Liberal Democrats gain from Labour		Swing	25.61	

6th May 1996
Party	Candidate	Votes	%	±%
Labour	Richard White	960	62.54	▼6.60
Liberal Democrats	Garry Airey	353	23.00	▼2.00
Liberal	K. White	222	14.46	▲10.11
Majority		607	39.54	▼4.60
Turnout		1,535		
Labour gain from Liberal Democrats		Swing	-2.30	

4th May 1995
Party	Candidate	Votes	%	±%
Labour	M. Clarke	1,286	69.14	▲7.84
Liberal Democrats	G. Hulme	465	25.00	▼7.85
Liberal	N. Roberts	81	4.35	▲0.08
Conservative	K. Watkin	28	1.51	▼0.07
Majority		821	44.14	▲15.68
Turnout		1,860		
Labour hold		Swing	7.84	

5th May 1994
Party	Candidate	Votes	%	±%
Labour	Neville Bann	1,592	61.30	▲20.46
Liberal Democrats	G. Hulme	853	32.85	▼14.77
Liberal	M. Langley	111	4.27	
Conservative	D. O'Leary	41	1.58	▼1.05
Majority		739	28.46	▲21.68
Turnout		2,597		
Labour hold		Swing	17.62	

7th May 1992
Party	Candidate	Votes	%	±%
Liberal Democrats	W. Barrow	1,159	47.62	▲12.65
Labour	Cecilia Holleran	994	40.84	▼19.34
Conservative	Denise O'Leary	64	2.63	▼2.23
Smithdown Labour	D. Bermingham	217	8.92	
Majority		165	6.78	▼18.44
Turnout		2,434		
Liberal Democrats gain from Labour		Swing	-16.00	

2nd May 1991
Party	Candidate	Votes	%	±%
Labour	M. Clarke	1,661	60.18	▼7.22
Liberal Democrats	W. Barrow	965	34.96	▲6.97
Conservative	D. O'Leary	134	4.86	▲2.40
Majority		696	25.22	▼14.19
Turnout		2,760		
Labour hold		Swing	-7.10	

3rd May 1990
Party	Candidate	Votes	%	±%
Labour	Juliet Herzog	2,632	67.40	▼9.44
Liberal Democrats	P. McGrath	1,093	27.99	▲10.15
Conservative	Denise O'Leary	96	2.46	▼2.86
Green	J. Stevenson	84	2.15	
Majority		1,539	39.41	▼19.59
Turnout		3,905		
Labour hold		Swing		

=== Elections of the 1980s ===
5th May 1988
Party	Candidate	Votes	%	±%
Labour	D. Bermingham	2,791	76.84	▲26.36
SLD	Mary Young	648	17.84	▼29.14
Conservative	F. Ryan	193	5.31	▲2.78
Majority		2,143	59.00	▲55.51
Turnout		3,632		
Labour hold		Swing		

7th May 1987 - 3 seats^{[a]}
Party	Candidate	Votes	%	±%
Labour	I. Templeman	2,682	54.77	▲4.29
Labour	Juliet Herzog	2,660		
Labour	Judith Nelson	2,555		
Alliance	E. R. Stephenson	2,102	42.92	▼4.06
Alliance	Shirley Parry	2,001		
Alliance	Mary Young	1,921		
Conservative	J.S. Smith	113	2.31	▼0.23
Conservative	Sarah L. Williamson	100		
Conservative	A. Vigar	82		
Majority		580	11.84	▲8.35
Registered electors		9,916		
Turnout		4,897	49.38	
Labour hold		Swing		
Labour hold		Swing		
Labour hold		Swing		

==== Notes ====
a. Alex Gamble, Steve Jenkins and Dorothy Mathews were surcharged and banned from office following the Rate-capping rebellion. Three seats were contested at the 1986 election.

1st May 1986
Party	Candidate	Votes	%	±%
Labour	A. Gamble	2,152	50.48	▼8.78
Alliance	E. Stephenson	2,003	46.99	▲9.80
Conservative	F. Sellers	108	2.53	▼1.02
Majority		149	3.50	▼18.57
Turnout		4,263		
Labour hold		Swing	5.67	

1st May 1984
Party	Candidate	Votes	%	±%
Labour	Dorothy Matthews	2,884	59.26	▲5.49
Liberal	Anne Clitherow	1,810	37.19	▼5.84
Conservative	S. J. Melia	173	3.55	▲0.36
Majority		1,074	22.07	▲11.33
Registered electors		10,331		
Turnout		4,867	47.11	▲4.26
Labour gain from Liberal		Swing	5.67	

5th May 1983
Party	Candidate	Votes	%	±%
Labour	S. M. Jenkins	2,454	53.77	▲0.26
Liberal	J. S. Clitherow	1,964	43.03	▲2.54
Conservative	B. J. Ardrey	146	3.20	▼2.80
Majority		490	10.74	▼2.28
Registered electors		10,650		
Turnout		4,564	42.85	▲9.48
Labour gain from Liberal		Swing	-1.14	

6 May 1982
Party	Candidate	Votes	%	±%
Labour	A. Gamble	1,981	53.51	▲16.96
Liberal	E. R. Stephenson	1,499	40.49	▼15.47
Conservative	R. C. Duncalf	222	6.00	▼1.49
Majority		482	13.02	▼6.40
Registered electors		10,744		
Turnout		3,702	33.37	▼0.94
Labour gain from Liberal		Swing	16.22	

6th May 1980 - 3 seats
Party	Candidate	Votes	%	±%
Liberal	Anne Clitherow	2,130	55.96	
Liberal	Joseph Sydney Clitherow	2,046		
Liberal	Ernest Richard Stephenson	1,949		
Labour	Peter Thomas Devaney	1,391	36.55	
Labour	Paul Herbert Gray	1,240		
Labour	Joseph Stanton	1,239		
Conservative	John Atherton	285	7.49	
Conservative	James McDermott	234		
Conservative	Rolland Louis Zollner	129		
Majority		739	19.42	
Registered electors		11,095		
Turnout		3,806	34.30	
Liberal win (new seat)				
Liberal win (new seat)				
Liberal win (new seat)				
