= Liverpool City Council =

Local government body in England

Coordinates: 53°24′25.9″N 2°59′30″W

- Coat of arms of Liverpool

- Corporate logo

Type
- Type: Metropolitan borough council

Leadership
- Lord Mayor: William Shortall, Labour since 13 May 2026
- Leader: Liam Robinson, Labour since 17 May 2023
- Chief Executive: Andrew Lewis since June 2023

Structure
- Seats: 85 councillors
- Graph of the party split among 85 seats.
- Political groups: Administration (57) Labour (57) Other parties (28) Liberal Democrats (13) Green (4) Liberal (3) Your Party (2) Independent (6)
- Joint committees: Liverpool City Region Combined Authority
- Length of term: 4 years

Elections
- Voting system: First-past-the-post
- Last election: 4 May 2023
- Next election: 6 May 2027

Motto
- Latin: Deus Nobis Haec Otia Fecit, lit. 'God has granted us this ease'

Meeting place
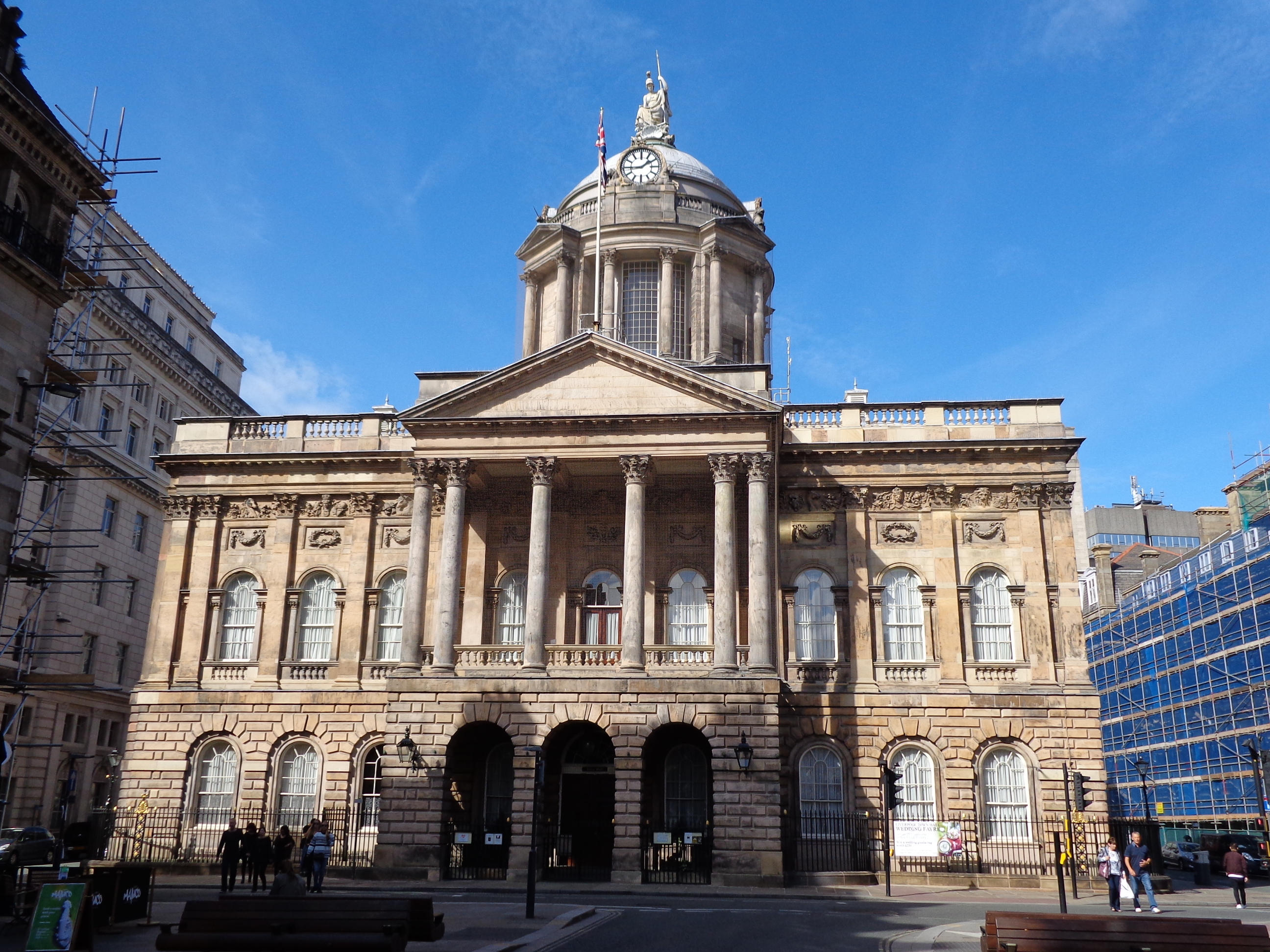
- Town Hall, High Street, Liverpool, L2 3SW

Website
- www.liverpool.gov.uk

Liverpool City Council is the local authority for the city of Liverpool in Merseyside, England. Liverpool has had a local authority since 1207, which has been reformed on numerous occasions. Prior to 1974 it was generally known as Liverpool Corporation. Since 1974 the council has been a metropolitan borough council. It provides the majority of local government services in the city. The council has been a member of the Liverpool City Region Combined Authority since 2014.

The council has been under Labour majority control since 2010. It meets at Liverpool Town Hall and has its main offices at the Cunard Building.

== History ==
Liverpool was an ancient borough, having been granted its first charter by King John in 1207. It had a mayor from at least 1292.

=== Municipal borough ===
Liverpool was reformed to become a municipal borough in 1836 under the Municipal Corporations Act 1835, which standardised how most boroughs operated across the country. It was then governed by a body formally called the 'mayor, aldermen and burgesses of the borough of Liverpool', generally known as the corporation or town council. As part of the same reforms, the borough boundaries were enlarged to match the larger Liverpool parliamentary constituency, which had been expanded in 1832 to include the neighbouring parishes of Everton and Kirkdale and part of West Derby. The corporation created a police force in 1836.

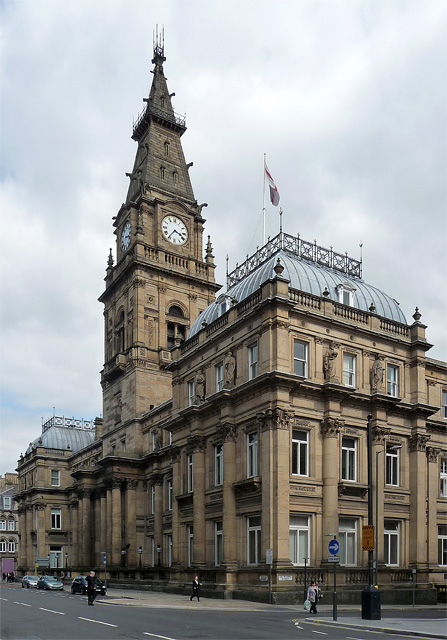
Municipal Buildings, Dale Street: Council's main offices 1868–2016

Liverpool was granted city status in 1880, after which the corporation was also known as the city council. When elected county councils were established in 1889, Liverpool was considered large enough to provide its own county-level services, and so it became a county borough, independent from the new Lancashire County Council, whilst remaining part of the geographical county of Lancashire. In 1893 the city was granted the right to appoint a lord mayor.

The city boundaries were enlarged on several occasions, notably gaining Wavertree, Walton and parts of Toxteth and West Derby in 1895, Fazakerley in 1905, Allerton, Childwall and Woolton in 1913, the rest of West Derby in 1928, and Speke in 1932.

Liverpool's first female councillor was Eleanor Rathbone, elected in 1909. Eighteen years later, Margaret Beavan became the first female Lord Mayor in 1927.

=== Metropolitan borough ===
The city was reformed to become a metropolitan district in 1974 under the Local Government Act 1972. It kept the same boundaries as the former county borough (which had last been adjusted in 1956) and became one of five metropolitan districts within the new metropolitan county of Merseyside. Liverpool's borough and city statuses and its lord mayoralty passed to the reformed district and its council.

From 1974 until 1986 the council was a lower-tier authority, with upper-tier functions provided by Merseyside County Council. The county council was abolished in 1986 and its functions passed to Merseyside's five borough councils, including Liverpool, with some services provided through joint committees.

During the 1980s, the Militant group gained control of Liverpool's Labour Party. Under their leadership the council attempted to challenge the national government on several issues, including refusing to set a budget in 1985. The leadership of the national Labour Party was drawn into the controversy, ultimately expelling members of Militant, including the council's deputy leader, Derek Hatton, in 1986.

The Liverpool Liberal Democrats led the council between 1998 and 2010, achieving a peak of 69 councillors in 2000.

In 2012 the council introduced the position of Mayor of Liverpool as a directly elected mayor to serve as the council's political leader instead of having a leader of the council chosen by the councillors. The position was separate from the more ceremonial role of the Lord Mayor. The directly elected mayor position was abolished in 2023 and the position of leader of the council was reinstated.

Since 2014 the council has been a member of the Liverpool City Region Combined Authority, which has been led by the directly elected Mayor of the Liverpool City Region since 2017. The combined authority provides strategic leadership and co-ordination for certain functions across the region, but Liverpool City Council continues to be responsible for most local government functions.

The council's chief executive, Ged Fitzgerald, was suspended in 2017 and subsequently resigned in 2018 following an investigation by Lancashire Constabulary into financial irregularities relating to a joint project between Lancashire County Council and British Telecom (BT) during Fitzgerald's tenure as chief executive of the county council. The police investigation subsequently widened to investigate alleged criminality at the city council and the Merseyside pension fund too. In 2020, it was reported that the city council's accounts since 2015 had not been signed off by its auditors on account of the 'complex ongoing police investigation'.

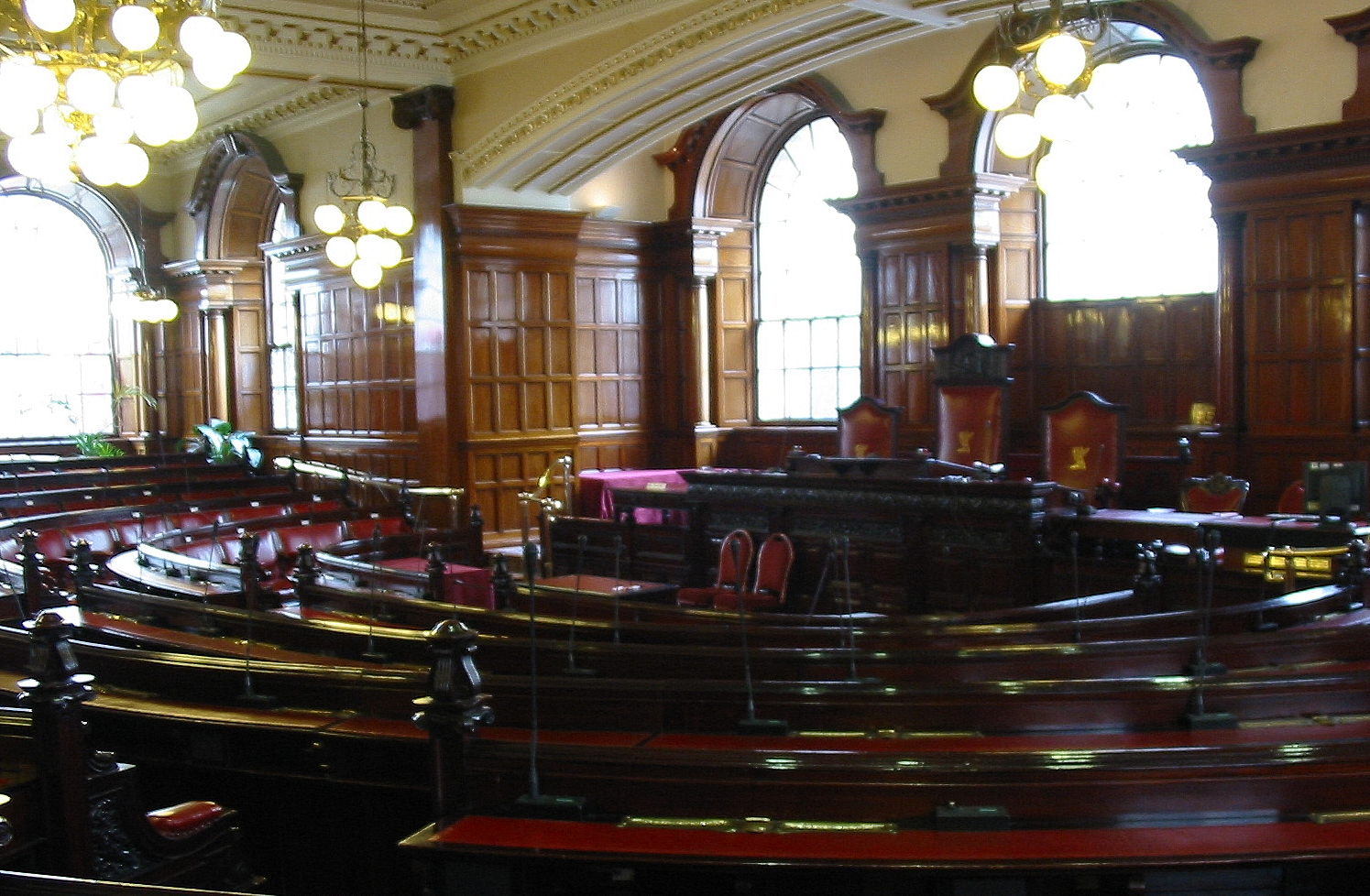
Liverpool City Council Chamber in Town Hall

In December 2020, the elected mayor, Joe Anderson, was arrested as part of an anti-corruption investigation. The Labour Party suspended Anderson on news of his arrest. He did not resign as mayor but stood back from active duties, handing effective control to the deputy mayor, Wendy Simon, for the remainder of his term of office to May 2021. After investigations, he was charged with bribery and misconduct in November 2025. He denies the charges, and a trial is anticipated in April 2027.

On 24 March 2021, the Secretary of State for Housing, Communities and Local Government, Robert Jenrick, announced that he was appointing commissioners to oversee some of the authority's functions for at least 3 years. This was following an investigation, commissioned in December 2020 that found there were "multiple apparent failures" and a "deeply concerning picture of mismanagement" in the council.

The commissioners remained in post until June 2024. Following improvements in the council's performance and management, the intervention was then scaled back to less direct supervision. The supervision ended and the commissioners' final report was issued in April 2025.

== Governance ==
Liverpool City Council provides metropolitan borough services. Some strategic functions in the area are provided by the Liverpool City Region Combined Authority; the leader of Liverpool City Council sits on the combined authority as Liverpool's representative. There are no civil parishes in the city.

=== Political control ===
The council has been under Labour majority control since 2010. In the late nineteenth and early twentieth centuries, the council was run by the Conservatives. Labour councillors were first elected to the council in 1905, but Liverpool was one of the last major cities in the UK in which the Labour Party gained control, which first occurred in 1955. The council was controlled or led by the Liberal Party, the Liberal–SDP Alliance and the Liberal Democrats during several periods, including between 1998 and 2010.

Municipal borough

Party in control	Years
Whig	1835–1841
Conservative	1841–1892
Liberal	1892–1895
Conservative	1895–1953
No overall control	1953–1955
Labour	1955–1961
Conservative	1961–1963
Labour	1963–1967
Conservative	1967–1971
No overall control	1971–1972
Labour	1972–1974

Political control of the council since the 1974 reforms has been as follows:

Metropolitan borough

Party in control	Years
No overall control	1974–1983
Labour	1983–1992
No overall control	1992–1996
Labour	1996–1998
Liberal Democrats	1998–2010
Labour	2010–present

=== Leadership ===
The role of Lord Mayor of Liverpool is largely ceremonial. Political leadership is instead provided by the leader of the council. Between 2012 and 2023 the council had a directly elected Mayor of Liverpool (a separate post from the Lord Mayor) instead of a leader. The directly elected mayor position was abolished in 2023 and the position of leader reinstated. The leaders since 1918 have been:

County Borough leaders

Councillor	Party	From	To
Charles Petrie	Conservative		4 Nov 1918
Archibald Salvidge	Conservative	18 Nov 1918	11 Dec 1928
Thomas White	Conservative	7 Jan 1929	25 Jan 1938
Alfred Shennan	Conservative	Feb 1938	May 1955
Jack Braddock	Labour	May 1955	May 1961
Maxwell Entwistle	Conservative	May 1961	May 1963
Jack Braddock	Labour	May 1963	12 Nov 1963
Bill Sefton	Labour	Nov 1963	May 1967
Harold Steward	Conservative	May 1967	May 1972
Bill Sefton	Labour	May 1972	31 Mar 1974

The last leader of the council before the 1974 reforms, Bill Sefton, went on to be the first leader of Merseyside County Council.

Metropolitan Borough leaders

Councillor	Party	From	To
Cyril Carr	Liberal	1 Apr 1974	22 Jan 1975
Bill Smyth	Liberal	Jan 1975	May 1976
John Hamilton	Labour	18 May 1976	May 1978
Trevor Jones	Liberal	May 1978	May 1983
John Hamilton	Labour	May 1983	Nov 1986
Tony Byrne	Labour	Nov 1986	Mar 1987
Trevor Jones	Liberal	Mar 1987	May 1987
Harry Rimmer	Labour	May 1987	5 Oct 1987
Keva Coombes	Labour	Oct 1987	May 1990
Harry Rimmer	Labour	May 1990	May 1996
Frank Prendergast	Labour	May 1996	May 1998
Mike Storey	Liberal Democrats	May 1998	25 Nov 2005
Warren Bradley	Liberal Democrats	7 Dec 2005	May 2010
Joe Anderson	Labour	25 May 2010	6 May 2012

Directly elected mayors (Note: Mayoral terms of office ran from the fourth day after polling day.)

Mayor	Party	From	To
Joe Anderson (Note: Joe Anderson was suspended from the Labour Party and stood aside from his mayoral role in December 2020. He remained nominally the mayor until the end of his term of office in May 2021, but the deputy mayor, Wendy Simon, served as acting mayor during that period.)	Labour	7 May 2012	Dec 2020
Joe Anderson	Independent	Dec 2020	9 May 2021
Joanne Anderson	Labour	10 May 2021	7 May 2023

Metropolitan Borough leaders

Councillor	Party	From	To
Liam Robinson	Labour	17 May 2023	Present

=== Composition ===
Following the 2023 election, and subsequent by-elections and changes of allegiance up to July 2026, the composition of the council is:

Party	Seats
Labour	57
Liberal Democrats	13
Green	4
Liberal	3
Your Party	2
Independent	6
Total	85

The next election is due in 2027.

== Elections ==
Since the last boundary changes in 2023, 85 councillors have been elected from 64 wards, with each ward electing one, two or three councillors. Elections are held every four years. These are the wards since the 2023 local elections.

1. Aigburth; 2. Allerton; 3. Anfield; 4. Arundel; 5. Belle Vale; 6. Broadgreen; 7. Brownlow Hill; 8. Calderstones; 9. Canning; 10. Childwall; 11. Church; 12. City Centre North; 13. City Centre South; 14. Clubmoor East; 15. Clubmoor West; 16. County; 17. Croxteth; 18. Croxteth Country Park; 19. Dingle; 20. Edge Hill; 21. Everton East; 22. Everton North; 23. Everton West; 24. Fazakerley East; 25. Fazakerley North; 26. Fazakerley West; 27. Festival Gardens; 28. Garston; 29. Gateacre; 30. Grassendale & Cressington; 31. Greenbank Park; 32. Kensington & Fairfield; 33. Kirkdale East	34. Kirkdale West; 35. Knotty Ash & Dovecot Park; 36. Mossley Hill; 37. Much Woolton & Hunts Cross; 38. Norris Green; 39. Old Swan East; 40. Old Swan West; 41. Orrell Park; 42. Penny Lane; 43. Princes Park; 44. Sandfield Park; 45. Sefton Park; 46. Smithdown; 47. Speke; 48. Springwood; 49. St Michaels; 50. Stoneycroft; 51. Toxteth; 52. Tuebrook Breckside Park; 53. Tuebrook Larkhill; 54. Vauxhall; 55. Walton; 56. Waterfront North; 57. Waterfront South; 58. Wavertree Garden Suburb; 59. Wavertree Village; 60. West Derby Deysbrook; 61. West Derby Leyfield; 62. West Derby Muirhead; 63. Woolton Village; 64. Yew Tree

== Premises ==
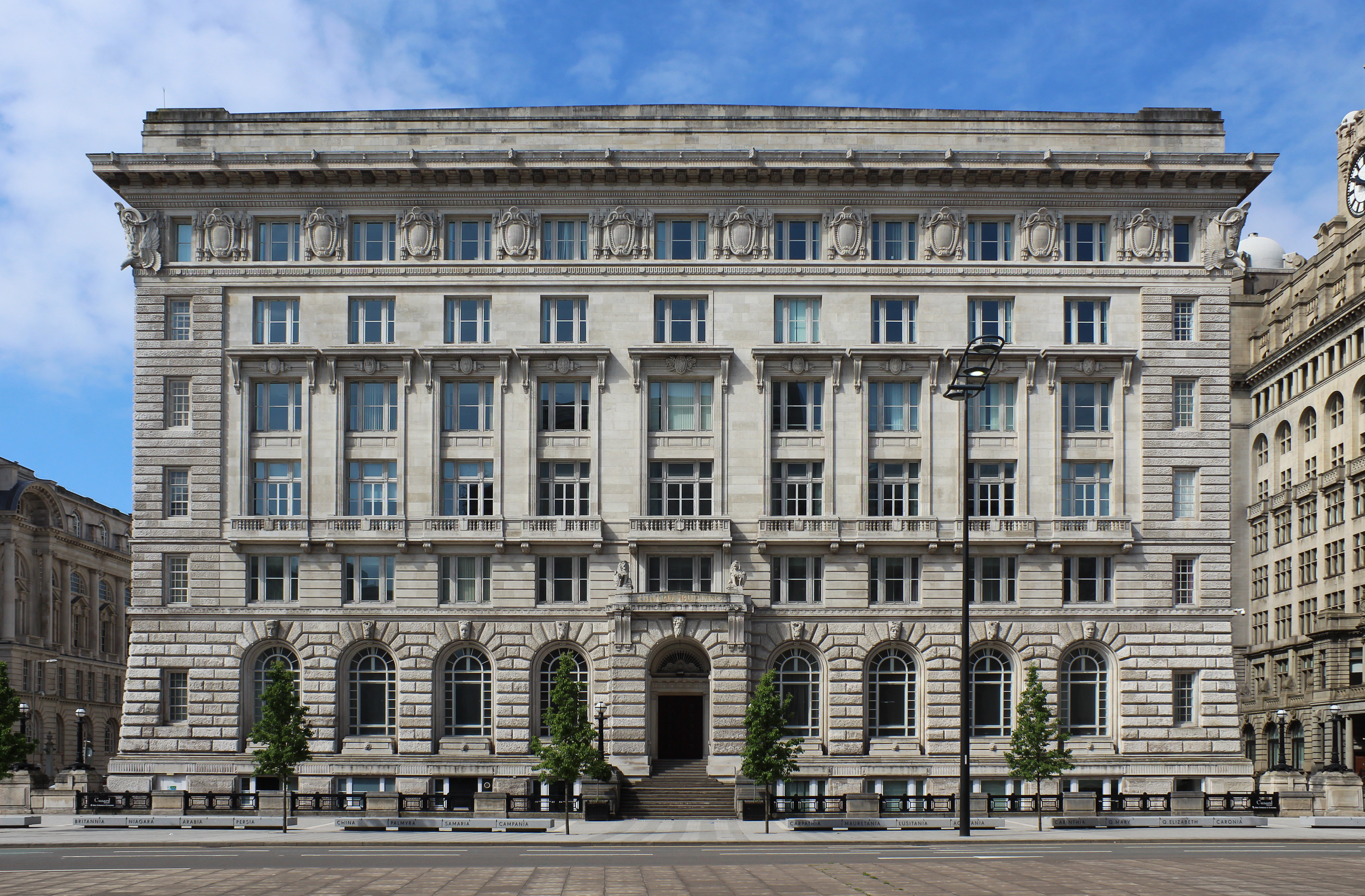
Cunard Building: Council's main offices

Council meetings are held at Liverpool Town Hall at the junction of High Street, Dale Street and Water Street, which was built between 1749 and 1754. The council's main administrative offices are located in the Cunard Building at Pier Head, which had been completed in 1917 as the headquarters of the Cunard Line. The council bought the building in 2013.

From 1868 until 2016 the council's main offices were the Municipal Buildings on Dale Street. The Municipal Buildings were sold in 2016 after the council decided they were too large and costly to maintain and following the transfer of most offices to the Cunard Building.

== Coat of arms ==
Coat of arms of Liverpool City Council
Adopted 1797 Crest On a Wreath of the Colours a Cormorant the wings elevated in the beak a Branch of Laver proper. Escutcheon Argent a Cormorant in the beak a Branch of Seaweed called Laver all proper. Supporters On the dexter Neptune with his Sea-Green Mantle flowing the waist wreathed with Laver on his head an Eastern Crown Gold in the right hand his Trident Sable the left supporting a Banner of the arms of Liverpool on the sinister a Triton wreathed as the dexter and blowing his Shell the right hand supporting a Banner thereon a Ship under sail in perspective all proper the Banner Staves Or. Motto 'Deus Nobis Haec Otia Fecit'
