= Joe Anderson (politician) =

Mayor of Liverpool from 2012 to 2021

Joe Anderson OBE
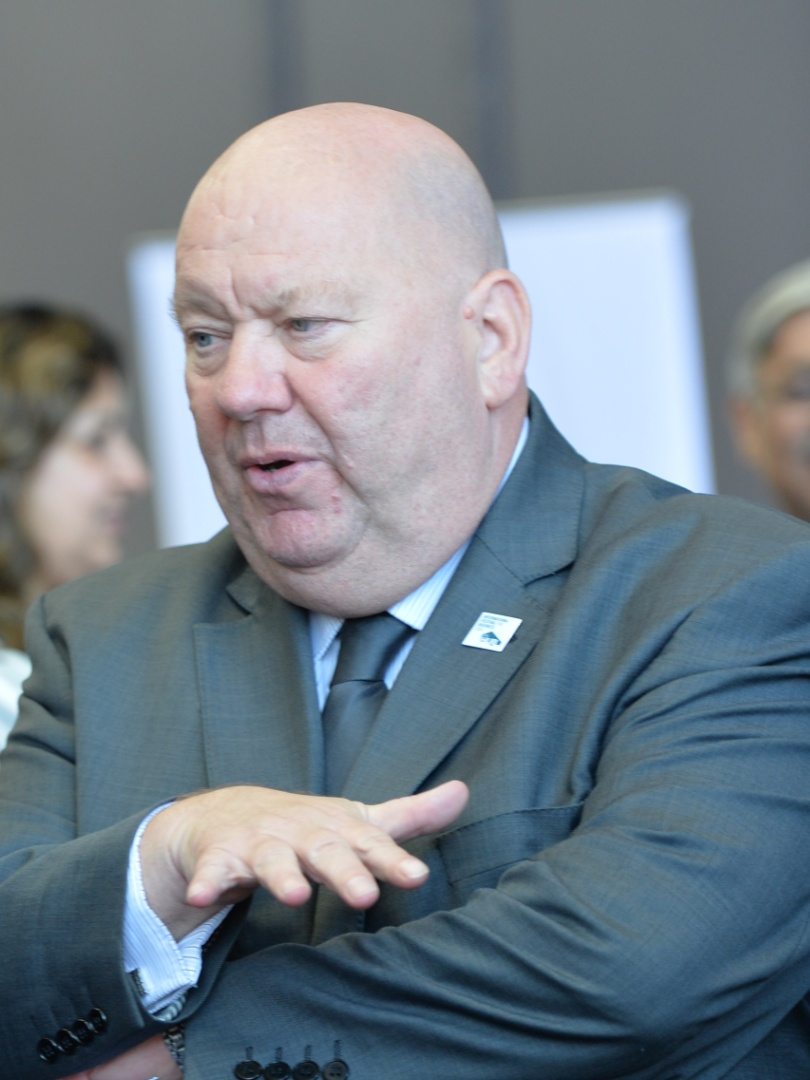
- Anderson in 2010

1st Mayor of Liverpool
- In office 7 May 2012 – 10 May 2021^{[a]}
- Deputy: Paul Brant; Roz Gladden; Ann O'Byrne; Wendy Simon; Lynnie Hinnigan
- Preceded by: Office created
- Succeeded by: Joanne Anderson

Leader of Liverpool City Council
- In office 6 May 2010 – 4 May 2012
- Deputy: Paul Brant
- Preceded by: Warren Bradley
- Succeeded by: Office abolished Liam Robinson (2023)

Councillor for Liverpool City Council
- In office 7 May 1998 – 4 May 2012
- Ward: Abercromby (1998–04); Riverside (2004–12)
- Preceded by: J. Hackett
- Succeeded by: Hetty Wood

Personal details
- Born: Joseph Anderson; 24 January 1958 (age 68) Liverpool, England
- Party: Independent
- Other political affiliations: Labour (Suspended)
- Education: Liverpool John Moores University
- Profession: Social worker, seafarer
- Website: www.joeanderson.co joeforliverpool.com
- ^aDeputy Mayor Wendy Simon exercised the powers and duties of the office of Mayor of Liverpool from 10 December 2020 to 10 May 2021 while Anderson temporarily stood down.

Joseph Anderson, OBE (born 24 January 1958) is a British politician who served as the first directly elected Mayor of Liverpool from 2012 to 2021. A member of the Labour Party until his suspension in November 2020, he also served as Leader of Liverpool City Council from 2010 to 2012.

Anderson was the leader of Liverpool City Council from the 2010 Council election until the 2012 Mayoral election. He was elected Mayor of Liverpool on 3 May 2012, winning with 57% of the vote. He won a second term in May 2016 with 52.6% of the vote.

He was also on the board of directors at Liverpool Vision, an Urban Regeneration Company within the city. He represented Liverpool City Council as a member of the Liverpool City Region Combined Authority.

In December 2020, Anderson temporarily stood down as Liverpool mayor after being arrested on suspicion of conspiracy to commit bribery and witness intimidation. In March 2025, he was charged with bribery, misconduct in a public office and conspiracy to commit misconduct in a public office. He was also suspended from the Labour Party.

== Early life ==
Joe Anderson was born in Liverpool on 24 January 1958. His mother was a cleaner at an office, while his father was in the Merchant Navy. He lived near the city centre during his early life, attending St Vincent's Primary School and St Martin's Secondary School. He joined the Merchant Navy when he left school and later worked for P&O Ferries, as well being a steward in the National Union of Seamen. He then attended Liverpool John Moores University as a mature student and obtained a postgraduate diploma in social work, allowing him to become a full-time social worker at Chesterfield High School in Crosby.

== Political career ==
=== Early political career (1998–2005) ===
Anderson was elected as a city councillor in 1998, first representing the Abercromby ward. In 2003, he became the Leader of the Labour group on Liverpool City Council, and in 2010 became the leader of the council, when Labour gained a majority of seats in the city.

Previously he was on the board of the Liverpool Culture Company, a group involved in developing a programme of events for Liverpool's year as European Capital of Culture in 2008. However, he resigned this position in 2007 after stating his concern at the lack of community involvement in planned events, alleging that an elitist attitude was developing among the board.

Anderson was, along with Liverpool Riverside MP Louise Ellman, involved with the campaign to free Michael Shields after his arrest and subsequent imprisonment in Bulgaria in 2005.

=== Recent years ===
In December 2015, Anderson was appointed as Leader of the Liverpool City Region Combined Authority. This was not a conventional election, but a joint decision by council leaders of neighbouring local authorities.

In May 2016, he announced his intention to run for the Labour Party nomination for the Mayor of the Liverpool City Region position. In the selection contest, he finished second to then-Liverpool Walton MP Steve Rotheram, who went on to win the election in May 2017. Anderson continued in his position as the Mayor of Liverpool.

In May 2017, Anderson sought selection as a Labour candidate to be the MP for the Liverpool Walton constituency but lost to then-Unite the Union official Dan Carden. Anderson issued a statement claiming: "Today we were reminded that the Labour Party is not always a meritocracy... after [the General Election] there will be more to say".

== Controversies ==
=== Matters associated with David McElhinney ===
In opposition, Anderson had been critical of the joint venture between Liverpool City Council and British Telecom (BT), called LDL. However, on becoming Council Leader, one of Anderson's first moves was to appoint David McElhinney as temporary chief executive of the council for the six-month period while the council was renegotiating its contract with BT. McElhinney was Chief Executive of LDL at the same time.

Cherie Booth KC was engaged to provide legal advice regarding the potential for conflict of interest. The LDL contract was extended, although it was subsequently terminated when it came to light that McElhinney's payments from a second council (Lancashire County Council) were under investigation. McElhinney and others were arrested as part of an investigation into allegations of conspiring to pervert the course of justice and intimidating witnesses, and have since been charged and await trial.

Anderson was interviewed by police under caution in November 2017.

=== Unfair dismissal case against Chesterfield High School and spending by council lawyers ===
In April 2015, Anderson brought legal proceedings against Chesterfield High School, claiming he had been unfairly dismissed from his role as a 'social inclusion mentor', despite having been on paid leave at £4,500 per annum for two years. Anderson lost part of his case at the first hearing and Chesterfield High school requested Anderson pay back a portion of the money he had received. The case attracted press attention when it was revealed Anderson had instructed Liverpool City Council lawyers to work on the case, while it was described as a private employment matter. The council had spent over £89,500 from public funds to support Anderson during the employment tribunal, according to information released following a Freedom of Information Act request.

The employment tribunal found Anderson had been unfairly dismissed "because proper processes had not been followed", but that the schools' governors were "entitled to terminate his employment because the pupils were not getting any benefit". Anderson appealed that decision to the Employment Appeals Tribunal, however the appeal was dismissed.

== Arrest ==
In December 2020, Anderson was one of five men arrested as part of an investigation (Operation Aloft) into building and development contracts in Liverpool. He was subsequently suspended from the Labour Party. Also arrested was Derek Hatton, a former deputy leader of the council. On 10 December 2020, Anderson announced that he was temporarily stepping aside from his duties, but would not stand down as Mayor of Liverpool.

On 31 December 2020, Anderson announced that he would not seek re-election as Mayor of Liverpool in the 2021 election, saying that "it would be in the best interests of the Labour Party to select a new candidate for the mayoral election".

A House of Lords debate about Anderson's arrest in April 2024 including Michael Heseltine questioning the long and continuing investigation period.

In March 2025, he was charged with bribery, misconduct in a public office and conspiracy to commit misconduct in a public office.

== Personal life ==
Anderson is a lifelong Everton F.C. fan, and spoke of his desire to see the club remain in the city, in opposition to the now-defunct Kirkby Project. In 2018, Anderson referred Ross Barkley's transfer to Chelsea to the police. The police found no wrongdoing.

Anderson was appointed Officer of the Order of the British Empire (OBE) in the 2012 Queen's Birthday Honours List for services to local government and the community.

Political offices
Preceded by Warren Bradley	Leader of Liverpool City Council; 2010–2012	Succeeded by Office abolished
New creation	Mayor of Liverpool; 2012–2021	Succeeded by Wendy Simon
Incumbent
