= Mayor of Liverpool =

2012–2023 chief executive of city in England

- Arms of Liverpool City Council
- Style: No title
- Appointer: Electorate of Liverpool
- Term length: Four years
- Inaugural holder: Joe Anderson
- Formation: 7 May 2012
- Final holder: Joanne Anderson
- Abolished: 2023
- Succession: Leader of Liverpool City Council
- Deputy: Deputy Mayor of Liverpool

From 2012 to 2023, the mayor of Liverpool was the executive mayor of the city of Liverpool in England. The office was abolished in 2023 and its functions were replaced with the leader of Liverpool City Council.

The mayor of Liverpool was previously branded 'the most powerful politician in England outside the capital', until metro-mayors were elected from 2016, such as the similarly named but separate mayor of the Liverpool City Region.

During 2012, Liverpool City Council decided at a council meeting to adopt the elected mayor executive arrangements, bypassing the typical practice of a local referendum as was planned that year in other cities. On 5 May 2012, former leader of Liverpool City Council Joe Anderson became Liverpool's first elected mayor. In December 2020, when Anderson was arrested on suspicion of bribery and witness intimidation, he maintained his innocence but said that he would not seek re-election. A referendum in Liverpool was due to be held in 2023 on the continuation of the mayoralty, but the city council voted to abolish the position from the May 2023 elections following public consultation.

== Role and powers of the mayor ==
The mayor was elected by the residents of Liverpool for a four-year period and was responsible for the executive functions of Liverpool City Council and for the day-to-day running of the organisation. They were charged with leading the city, building investor confidence, and directing new resources to economic priorities. The mayor did not have responsibility for setting the Council budget or formulating policy framework plans as these remained with the city council. The mayor appointed a cabinet of two or more councillors (also called the "Executive"), who did not have to be from the same political party: the mayor decided on the size of the cabinet and to what extent executive functions were delegated. The mayor also benefitted from so called 'soft powers' conferred on them by being directly elected, which enabled them to influence, persuade and co-ordinate on a wider scale.

The mayor was entitled to sit on the proposed "Cabinet of Mayors", along with the other directly elected mayors in England and Wales. Such a position allows a direct route to the prime minister and other senior ministers. Cabinet meetings were to be held at least twice a year offering the opportunity to discuss local issues with decision-makers in Whitehall.

In July 2022, Liverpool City Council voted to scrap the directly-elected mayor position, replacing it with a leader and cabinet model. The changes took effect from May 2023.

== Mayor for Liverpool City Region ==
A number of commentators had expressed disappointment that the mayor's remit did not cover the entire metropolitan area of Liverpool, or the Liverpool City Region. A 2011 report by former Deputy Prime Minister Michael Heseltine and Terry Leahy argued that a directly elected mayor should cover the six districts of the Liverpool City Region. The report argued that "in marketing terms Liverpool is a world class brand" and "it would be perverse to do other than embrace the wider area within an identity recognised across the globe."

After opposition from the boroughs of Wirral, St Helens and Sefton, the idea of a city region mayor was dropped. Minister for Cities, Greg Clark, ruled out the move as "too difficult for now", citing the need for fresh primary legislation and a reorganisation of local government boundaries as practical barriers to the concept.

In November 2015, the Liverpool City Region Combined Authority agreed to a devolution deal with government that resulted in the creation of a 'metro mayor' for the city region. Elections were held in 2017, and Steve Rotheram was elected.

== Elections ==
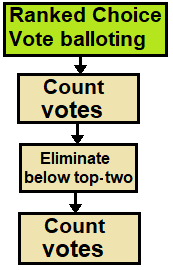
The supplementary vote system

The mayor was elected by the supplementary vote system for a period of four years. Each voter lists both a first and second choice candidate. If no-one gets more than 50% of the vote the second choices are allocated to the top two candidates.

=== 2021 ===
==== Background ====
In December 2020, Mayor Joe Anderson was arrested on suspicion of bribery and witness intimidation; he said he would not seek re-election. Deputy Mayor Wendy Simon exercised the powers and duties of the office of Mayor of Liverpool from 2020 to 2021 after Anderson temporarily stepped aside in December 2020. Although Anderson formally remained as Mayor until the end of his term, Simon performed Anderson's duties.

A referendum in Liverpool was held in 2023 on the continuation of the mayoralty.

==== Labour Party mayoral selection ====
Eight candidates declared their intention to become the Labour candidate for Mayor of Liverpool. This was short-listed down to three female city councillors: acting mayor Wendy Simon, former deputy mayor Ann O'Byrne and current Lord Mayor Anna Rothery. The result of the internal selection was due to be announced on 5 March. Rothery was endorsed by Dawn Butler MP, Dan Carden MP, Ian Byrne MP, and Jeremy Corbyn, former Leader of the Labour Party and MP for Islington North, as well as Unite the Union.

However, when ballots were supposed to go out in mid-February the party halted the process to re-interview candidates. The Labour Party then decided to re-open the selection process and barred all three original candidates from standing, without any reason being given. Councillor Joanne Anderson was later selected to be Labour's candidate for the city.

==== Result ====
Liverpool Mayoral Election 6 May 2021
Party	Candidate	1st round		2nd round			1st round votesTransfer votes, 2nd round
Party	Candidate	Total	Of round	Transfers	Total	Of round	1st round votesTransfer votes, 2nd round
Labour	Joanne Anderson	38,958	38.15%	7,535	46,493	59.2%	
Independent	Stephen Yip	22,047	21.79%	10,032	32,079	40.8%	
Liberal Democrats	Richard Kemp	17,166	16.79%				
Green	Tom Crone	8,768	8.67%				
Liberal	Steve Radford	7,135	7.05%				
Conservative	Katie Burgess	4,187	4.14%				
TUSC	Roger Bannister	2,912	2.88%				
Registered electors		336,382					
Turnout		101,173	30.51%				
Rejected ballots		3,978					
Labour hold							

=== 2016 ===
Liverpool Mayoral Election 5 May 2016
Party	Candidate	1st round		2nd round			1st round votesTransfer votes, 2nd round
Party	Candidate	Total	Of round	Transfers	Total	Of round	1st round votesTransfer votes, 2nd round
Labour	Joe Anderson	51,332	52.6%				
Liberal Democrats	Richard Kemp	20,598	21.1%				
Green	Tom Crone	10,609	10.9%				
TUSC	Roger Bannister	4,950	5.1%				
Independent	Alan Hutchinson	3,964	4.1%				
Conservative	Tony Caldeira	3,533	3.6%				
English Democrat	Paul Duane Rimmer	2,590	2.7%				
Registered electors		315,909					
Turnout		97,576	30.9%				
Rejected ballots		1,539					
Labour hold							

=== 2012 ===
Liverpool Mayoral Election 3 May 2012
Party	Candidate	1st round		2nd round			1st round votesTransfer votes, 2nd round
Party	Candidate	Total	Of round	Transfers	Total	Of round	1st round votesTransfer votes, 2nd round
Labour	Joe Anderson	58,448	59.33%				
Independent	Liam Fogarty	8,292	8.42%				
Liberal Democrats	Richard Kemp	6,238	6.33%				
Green	John Coyne	5,175	5.25%				
TUSC	Tony Mulhearn	4,792	4.86%				
Liberal	Steve Radford	4,442	4.51%				
Conservative	Tony Caldeira	4,425	4.49%				
UKIP	Adam Heatherington	2,352	2.39%				
English Democrat	Paul Rimmer	1,400	1.42%				
Liverpool Independent Party	Jeff Berman	1,362	1.38%				
BNP	Mike Whitby	1,015	1.03%				
National Front	Peter Tierney	453	0.57%				
Registered electors		319,758					
Turnout		98,507	31.68%				
Rejected ballots							
Labour win							

== List of mayors ==
Joe Anderson was the inaugural holder of the office of Mayor of Liverpool, first elected in 2012. He indefinitely handed over the powers and duties of the office to his deputy mayor, Wendy Simon, in December 2020 following a bribery scandal. Simon served as acting mayor until the 2021 mayoral election, when Joanne Anderson (no relation to Joe Anderson) was elected.

Denotes service as acting mayor
Labour
Independent

#	Name	Entered office	Left office	Deputy Mayor	Photo
1	Joe Anderson	7 May 2012	10 May 2021 (on leave, 10 December 2020-10 May 2021)	Ann O'Byrne; Wendy Simon	
-	Wendy Simon	10 December 2020	10 May 2021	Lynnie Hinnigan	
2	Joanne Anderson	10 May 2021	7 May 2023	Jane Corbett	

== Fairness ==
A multi-agency Fairness Commission reported to Mayor Anderson in May 2012, making recommendations on how Liverpool could become "a fairer, more inclusive and equitable city". As a result Anderson commissioned further work on the adoption of social value as an objective of commissioning and procurement within the city.

== Salary ==
The Mayor of Liverpool was paid £77,039.89 in 2012–13. Since 2013, they have been paid £79,500 per annum. An independent panel of experts had recommended that the Mayor's salary should be closer to £80,000 which is intended to reflect the size and population of the city, as well as the role and responsibilities associated with the position both in terms of the executive functions and proposing and implementing of key strategic plans.
