= List of commemorative plaques in Merseyside =

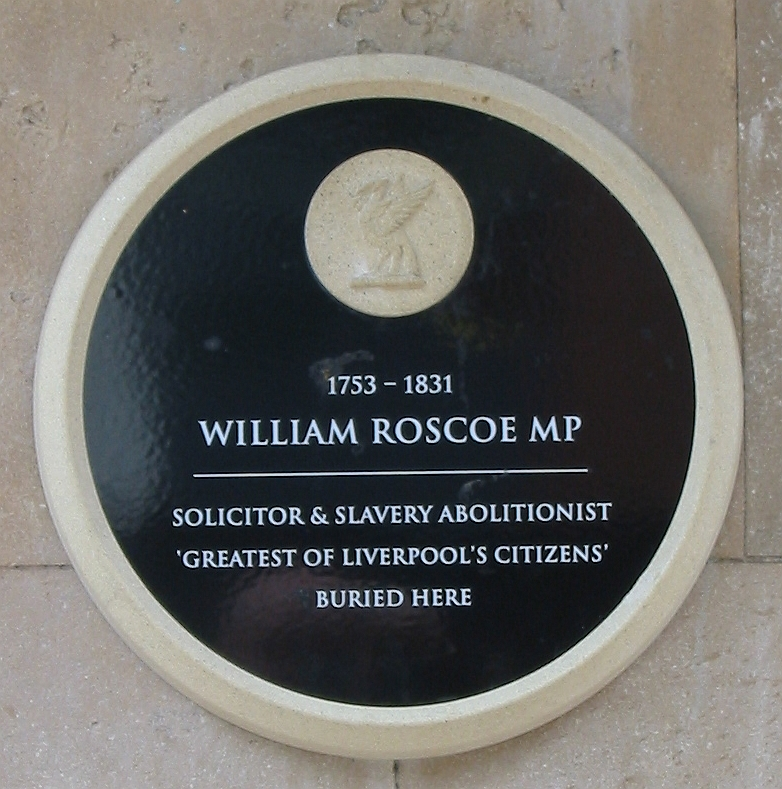
Liverpool City Council commemorative plaque

Commemorative plaques in Merseyside, England, can be found across the region, highlighting notable people, buildings or historic sites. Many of the plaques are issued by authoritative bodies such as a council or a historical society that has a special interest.

== English Heritage ==
In the year 2000, London's blue plaque scheme was expanded to locations outside of the capital. In Liverpool, 14 English Heritage plaques were erected before the short-lived scheme ended.

Subject	Commemoration	Location	Inscription	Ref.
Person	Bessie Braddock	2 Zig Zag Road, L12	Bessie Braddock 1899–1970 Labour politician and campaigner lived here 1945–1970	
Person	Charles Reilly	171 Chatham Street, L7	Sir Charles Herbert Reilly 1874–1948 Professor of Architecture lived here 1922–1925	
Person	Frank Hornby	The Hollies, Station Road, L31	Frank Hornby 1863–1936 Toy Manufacturer lived here	
Person	Henry Tate	42 Hamilton Street, Birkenhead	Sir Henry Tate 1819–1899 Sugar magnate and founder of the Tate Gallery traded here 1851–1861	
Person	John Brodie	28 Ullet Road, L17	John Brodie 1858–1934 City Engineer lived here	
Person	John Lennon	251 Menlove Avenue, L25	John Lennon 1940–1980 Musician and Songwriter lived here 1945-1963	
Person	Joseph Mayer	Pennant House, Bebington, Wirral	Joseph Mayer 1803–1886 Antiquary and Collector lived here 1860–1886	
Person	Noel Chavasse	19 Abercromby Square, L3	Captain Noel Chavasse V.C. And Bar 1884–1917 Royal Army Medical Corps hero lived here	
Person	Peter Ellis	40 Falkner Square, L8	Peter Ellis 1804-1884 Architect lived here	
Person	Patrick Abercrombie	18 Village Road, Oxton, Birkenhead	Sir Patrick Abercrombie 1879–1957 Town and country planning pioneer lived here 1915–1935	
Person	Ronald Ross	The Johnston Building, Quadrangle, L3	Sir Ronald Ross 1857–1932 Discoverer of the mosquito transmission of malaria worked here	
Person	Thomas Henry Ismay	13 Beach Lawn, L22	Thomas Henry Ismay 1837–1899 Founder of the White Star Line lived here	
Person	Wilfred Owen	7 Elm Grove, Birkenhead	Wilfred Owen 1893–1918 War Poet lived here 1900–1903	
Person	William and Eleanor Rathbone	Greenbank House, Greenbank Lane, L18	William Rathbone 1819–1902 And His Daughter Eleanor Rathbone 1872–1946 Politicians and Social reformers lived here	

== Liverpool City Council ==
Prior to 2005, a multitude of commemorative plaque of different colours could be found across Liverpool. Since then, some of these plaques have been replaced by Liverpool City Council with new black faced and stone-rimmed ones. Over 100 black plaques have been installed.

Subject	Commemoration	Location	Inscription	Ref.
Building	18th Century Liverpool Merchants House	1 Trueman St	Built 1790 1 Trueman Street Finest Surviving Example Of A Georgian Merchants House In Liverpool	
Person	Anthony Panizzi	Picton Library, William Brown Street	Lived And Taught Italian In Liverpool 1823–1828. Principal Liberian At The British Museum. Responsible For The British Museum Circular Reading Room On Which The Picton Library Is Modelled.	
Building	Bank Of British West Africa	West Africa House, 25 Water St (Standard Chartered Bank)	Built 1920 West Africa House Designed By Briggs, Wolstenholme & Thornely Former Bank Of British West Africa	
Building	Castle Hey Chapel	Pearl Assurance House, Castle St / Harrington St	Registered Under Toleration Act 1689 Castle Hey Chapel From Whose Congregation Ullet Road Unitarian Church Was Founded Built Here	
Building	Castle Moat House	Castle Moat House, Derby Square	Built 1838–1840 Castle Moat House Designed By Edward Corbett Former North & South Wales Bank	
Historic Site	Castle Street	2 Castle Street, East elevation	Established C1240 Castle Street Lead To Liverpool Castle Demolished 1726	
Historic Site	Castle Street	55 Castle Street	Established C1240 Castle Street Lead To Liverpool Castle Demolished 1726 Now The Site Of Derby Square & Victoria Monument	
Historic Site	Chapel Street	Chapel Street (West End), St Nicholas Church Boundary Wall	Established C1257 Chapel Street Named After The Chapel St Mary Del Quay	
Historic Site	Chapel Street	Chapel Street (East End), North elevation of Exchange Buildings	Established C1257 Chapel Street Named After The Chapel St Mary Del Quay Demolished 1814	
Person	Charles Booth	Liverpool University Sports Hall	1840–1916 Charles Booth Ship Owner & Pioneer Of Social Research Born Here	
Person	Charles James Mathews	Marks and Spencers, Basnett St	1803–1878 Charles James Mathews Actor, Theatre Manager & Playwright Born Here	
Building	Church Of Our Lady Of St Nicholas	St Nicholas Church doorway, Old Church Yard Off Chapel St	Founded C. 1360 Church Of Our Lady & St Nicholas Liverpool Parish Church Known Locally As The Sailors Church'	
Building	Compton House	Marks and Spencer, Church St	Opened 1867 Compton House Designed By Thomas Haigh & Co One Of The Earliest Purpose Bilt Department Stores In Europe	
Building	Corn Exchange	Corn Exchange, Fenwick St	Opened 1808 Corn Exchange Designed By John Foster Junior The First In England Rebuilt 1953–1959	
Historic Site	Dale Street	1 Dale Street (South elevation)	Established C1207 Dale Street Formally Dele (Dale) Street Here It Joined The Dell Through Which The Stream Ran Towards The Pool	
Historic Site	Dale Street	139 Dale Street (South elevation)	Established C1207 Dale Street Formally Dele (Dale) Street Here It Joined The Dell Through Which The Stream Ran Towards The Pool	
Building	First House in Rodney Street	35 Rodney Street	Built C. 1783–1784 35 Rodney Street First House To Be Erected On Rodney Street On A Site Leased By William Roscoe	
Person	George Stephenson	34 Upper Parliament Street	1781–1848 George Stephenson Chief Engineer Liverpool & Manchester Railway Lived Here	
Person	Gerrard Manley Hopkins	St Francis Xavier, Salisbury Street	1844–1889 Gerard Manley Hopkins S.J. Poet Served As A Priest 1879–1881	
Person	Goree Warehouses	25 Beetham Plaza	Built 1793 Goree Warehouses Destroyed By Fire & Rebuilt In 1802 Damaged In Air Raid In 1941 Demolished 1948–1950	
Person	Hargreaves Building	Hargreaves Building, Chapel St	Built 1859 Hargreaves Building Designed By J.A.Picton For Sir William Brown	
Person	Henry Booth	British Legion Club, 34 Rodney Street	1789–1869 Henry Booth Founder & Director The Liverpool & Manchester Railway Company Born Here	
Person	Herbert Louis, 1st Viscount Samuel	11 Belvidere Road	Herbert, 1St Viscount Samuel Of Mount Carmel And Toxteth, (1870–1963) Statesman. Was Born Here.	
Historic Site	High Street	High Street (South end), West elevation of 1 Dale Street	Laid Out C1207 High Street Formally Joggler (Juggler) Street Site Of Weekly Market & Annual Fair Here Its Southern End Was Marked By The High Cross	
Historic Site	High Street	Chapel Street – Exchange Building (North elevation)	Laid Out C1207 High Street Formally Joggler (Juggler) Street Site Of Weekly Market & Annual Fair Here At Its Northern End Was Marked By The White Cross	
Building	Hope Hall	Everyman Theatre, Hope St	Built C. 1837 Hope Hall Revivalist Preaching House 1853–1916	
Person	James Currie	George Henry Lee, Church Street	1756–1805 Dr James Currie Humanitarian & First Biographer Of Robert Burns Lived Here	
Person	John Foster Junior	Notre Dame Convent, Mount Pleasant	C.1786–1846 John Foster Junior Architect & Corporation Surveyor Lived Here	
Person	John Newton	Orleans House, Edmund St	1725–1807 John Newton Abolitionist & Clergyman Author Of The Hymn 'Amazing Grace' Surveyor Of Tides 1754–1755 Lived Here	
Person	John Newton	Orleans House, Edmund St	Built 1907 Orleans House Designed By Matear & Simon An Important Cotton Trading Centre	
Person	Joseph Blanco White	Roscoe Memorial Gardens, Mount Pleasant	1775–1841 Joseph Blanco White Spanish Writer & Political Exile Buried Near Here	
	Lib.Jewish Synagogue	1 Hope Place		
Building	Liverpool Medical Institution	Liverpool Medical Institution, Mount Pleasant	Founded 1836 Liverpool Medical Institution Designed By Clarke Rampling William Roscoe, Poet & Slavery Abolitionist Born Here 1753	
Building	Lyceum	Lyceum, Bold Street	Lyceum Liverpool Library & Newsroom Designed By Thomas Harrison	
Building	Lyceum	Lyceum, Bold Street	Built 1800–1802 Lyceum Liverpool Library & Newsroom Designed By Thomas Harrison	
Person	Lytton Strachey	80 Rodney Street	1880–1932 Lytton Strachey Biographer, Historian & Member Of The Bloomsbury Group Lived Here	
Building	Maltese Cross	Top Shop Store, Church St	1704–1922 St Peter'S Church The Brass Cross Marks The Site Of An Entrance To The Anglican Pro Cathedral	
Person	Matthew Arnold	Alfred Stocks Court, Turner Close	1822–1888 Matthew Arnold English Critic & Poet Died Nearby	
Building	Mechanics Institution	Liverpool Institute Mount Street	1835–1837 Liverpool Mechanics Institution Designed By A.H. Holme Charles Dickens Gave Readings Here	
Building	Metropolitan Cathedral Crypt	Cathedral Crypt	Opened 1958 Metropolitan Cathedral Crypt Designed By Sir Edwin Lutyens O.M. 1869–1944 Foundation Stone Laid 1933	
Building	Oceanic Steam Co. & White Star Building	Albion House, 30 James St	Built 1896–1898 Albion House Designed By Richard Norman Shaw White Star Line Offices	
Building	Oceanic Steam Co. & White Star Building	Albion House, 30 James St	Founded 1869 The Oceanic Navigation Steam Company Founded By T.H. Ismay	
Building	Octagon Chapel	3 Temple Court (Between Victoria St & Mathew St)	1763–1776 Octagonal Chapel Designed By Joseph Finney Later St Catherine'S Church 1776–1820 Built Here	
Historic Site	Old Hall Street	Daily Post & Echo Building, Old Hall Street	Established C1207 Old Hall Street Formerly Milne (Mill) Street Moore Hall Was Built In The C13 But Known As Old Hall After The Moore Family Moved To Bank Hall, Kirkdale In The C14 Old Hall Demolished C1820	
Historic Site	Old Hall Street	1–9 Old Hall Street	Established C1207 Old Hall Street Formerly Milne (Mill) Street Moore Hall Was Built In The C13 But Known As Old Hall After The Moore Family Moved To Bank Hall, Kirkdale In The C14 Old Hall Demolished C1820	
Person	Peter Litherland	Lewis's Store, Renshaw Street	1756–1804 Peter Litherland Revised & Patented The Rack Lever Escapement Watch Workshop Built Here	
Building	Philharmonic Dining Rooms	Hope Street	Built 1898–1900 Philharmonic Hotel Designed By Walter Thomas Decorative Work By Liverpool University School Of Applied Art Gates By H. Bloomfield Bare	
Building	Philharmonic Hall	Philharmonic Hall, Hope Street	Built 1939 Philharmonic Hall Designed By Herbert J. Rowse Built On Site Of Philharmonic Hall 1846–1849 Designed By J. Cunningham Destroyed By Fire 1933	
Building	Prudential Assurance Building	Prudential Assurance, Dale St	Built 1885–1886 Prudential Assurance Building Designed By Alfred Waterhouse	
Building	Queen Insurance Building	8–12 Dale St	Built 1837–1839 Queen Insurance Building Designed By Samuel Rowland For The Royal Bank	
Building	Royal Insurance Building	Royal Insurance, 1 North John St	Built 1896–1903 National Headquarters Royal Insurance Building Designed By James F. Doyle Very Early Use Of Steel Framed Construction	
Building	Saracen's Head	Municipal Buildings, Dale Street	1810–1853 Saracen'S Head Liverpool'S Most Famous Coaching Inn Built Here	
Building	School for the Blind	Former Police Station, Hardman Street	Built 1850–1851 Liverpool School For The Blind Designed By A.H. Holme First School Of Its Kind In Britain, Founded 1791	
Building	School Of Art	Art College, Hope Street	Founded 1910 Liverpool School Of Art Designed By Willink & Thicknesse Mount Street Front 1882–1883 By Thomas Cook	
Building	Sir Banestre Tarleton	9-11 Fenwick Street	1754–1833 Sir Banestre Tarleton Mp Major General Born Here	
Building	Site −1st India Bldgs & Bldgs Architect	India Buildings, Water Street	Built 1923–1937 India Buildings Designed By A.Thornely & H.J. Rowse Home Of The Alfred Holt & Co Shipping Line The Site Of The First India Buildings Built 1837–1839	
Building	St Luke's Church & Gardens	St Luke's Church, Berry St / Leece St	Built 1811–1831 St Luke's Church & Gardens Designed By John Foster Senior & John Foster Junior Struck By Enemy Fire May 1941 Remains As Memorial To Those Who Died	
Building	St Mary Del Quay	St Nicholas’ Church, St Georges Dock Gates	C. 1257–1565 St Mary Del Quay Ancient Chapel Demolished 1814 Built Here	
Building	St Phillips Church	Hardman House formerly Atlantic House, Hardman Street	Built 1816 St Philip's Church Erected By John Cragg From Designs By Thomas Rickman Closed 1882	
Historic Site	Synagogue Court	MetQuarter, Victoria Street	Built By Joseph Clegg Mayor Of Liverpool 1748 Synagogue Court Here Stood Liverpool's First Synagogue & Burial Ground C1750 "Let Them Make For Me A Sanctuary And I Will Dwell Among Them" Exodus 25:8	
Historic Site	Theatre Royal	Corn Exchange, Drury Lane	Built 1750 The Theatre Renamed The Theatre Royal 1771 Demolished C. 1828 Built Here	
Person	Thomas Creevey	School Lane	1768–1838 Thomas Creevey Mp & Diarist Born Here	
Person	Thurston Holland	43 Rodney Street	1863–1941 Mr Thurson Holland C.H.M. F.R.C.S. L.L.D. Pioneer Of Radiology Worked & Lived Here	
Historic Site	Tithebarn Street	59/61 Tithebarn Street (Beetham House, south elevation)	Tithebarn Street Established As Moor Street C1270 Renamed In C16 When Molyneux Family Built A Barn Here To House Tithes Of Parish Of Walton	
Historic Site	Tithebarn Street	1 Tithebarn Street (Tithebarn House, south elevation)	Tithebarn Street Established As Moor Street C1270 Renamed In C16 When Molyneux Family Built A Barn Here To House Tithes Of Parish Of Walton	
Building	Tower Building	Tower Building, Water St	Built 1908 Tower Building Designed By W. Aubrey Thomas Site Of Tower C. 1406 Fortified By Sir John Stanley	
Building	Turner Home (Lodge)	Turner home, Dingle Lane	1882–1885 Turner Nursing Home Designed By Alfred Waterhouse In Memory Of Charles Turner Mp	
Building	Unitarian Church	Ullet Road	1896–1902 Ullet Road Unitarian Church Designed By Thomas Percy Worthington	
Historic Site	Water Street	22 Water Street (West End), South elevation of Tower Buildings	Established C1207 Water Street Formally Bonk (Bank) Street Here Its Western End Joined The Bank Of The River Mersey	
Historic Site	Water Street	1 Water Street (East End), North elevation of 2 Castle Street	Established C1207 Water Street Formally Bonk (Bank) Street Lead To The Original Bank Of The River Mersey	
Building	Wellington Rooms	127 Mount Pleasant	Built 1815–1816 Wellington Rooms Designed By Edmund Aikin Formerly Assembly Rooms	
Person	William Ewart	Roe St / Hood St	1798–1869 William Ewart Mp Pioneer Of Public Libraries Born Nearby	
Person	William Roscoe	Liverpool Medical Institution, Mount Pleasant	Solicitor & Slavery Abolitionist Greatest Of Liverpool'S Citizens' Buried Here	
Person	William Roscoe	Roscoe Memorial Gardens, Mount Pleasant	1753–1831 William Roscoe Mp Solicitor & Slavery Abolitionist Greatest Of Liverpool'S Citizens' Buried Here	
Building	Wykes Court	111 Dale Street, Law Courts	1720–1787 Wykes Court John Wyke Watch Maker Worked & Lived Here	

== The Wavertree Society ==
Centred around Wavertree, Liverpool, local conservation group The Wavertree Society aims to preserve the area's architectural heritage and has issued its on series of green plaques. Its first three plaque were installed on 9 March 2012 and commemorated the Lock-up, the Monk's Well and Picton Clock Tower. The plaques themselves are manufactured by local firm Photocast Products Ltd, located in nearby Speke.

Commemoration	Location	Inscription	Ref.
Holy Trinity Church	Church Road, Liverpool	Designed by John Hope. Consecrated 1794 by the Rt Rev'd William Cleaver, Bishop of Chester. Altered and extended 1911 by Sir Charles Reilly.	
No.102 High Street	High Street, Wavertree	Liverpool's only surviving example of a Georgian bow-windowed shopfront.	
Picton Clock Tower	Childwall Road, Liverpool	Presented to the people of Wavertree in 1884 by Sir James Picton, architect, historian and politician, as a memorial to his wife Sarah Pooley.	
Royal School For The Blind	Church Road North, Liverpool	Founded in Liverpool in 1791, and moved here, to the site of Wavertree Hall in 1898. Legend has it that these gates will never be opened.	
The Blue Coat School	Church Road, Liverpool	Founded 1708 by Brian Blundell in School Lane, Liverpool. Moved here in 1906. Architects Briggs, Wolstenholme & Thornley.	
The Coffee House	Church Road North, Liverpool	Probably Wavertree's oldest surviving public-house. In the 19th century it incorporated the Assembly Rooms and the Crown Brewery.	
The Lock-up	Childwall Road, Liverpool	Built in 1796 to house drunks and criminals overnight, it later accommodated cholera victims and refugees from the Irish Famine	
The Monk's Well	Mill Lane, Wavertree	Source of legend for many generations, The Latin rhyme means: 'He who here does nought bestow, the Devil laughs at him below'	
The Smallest House	93 High Street, Liverpool	Later part of the Cock & Bottle public house, No. 95 High Street was once known as the Smallest House in England.	
Wavertree Garden Suburb Institute	Thingwall Road, Liverpool	Two 18th century farm cottages, converted 1912 to be the social, cultural and educational centre for the local community.	
Wavertree Town Hall	89 High Street in Wavertree	Headquarters of the Wavertree Local Board of Health, between 1872 and 1895. The Latin motto means: 'I flourish in the shade'.	
