= Grade II listed buildings in Liverpool-L15 =

Liverpool is a city and port in Merseyside, England, which contains many listed buildings. A listed building is a structure designated by English Heritage of being of architectural and/or of historical importance and, as such, is included in the National Heritage List for England. There are three grades of listing, according to the degree of importance of the structure. Grade I includes those buildings that are of "exceptional interest, sometimes considered to be internationally important"; the buildings in Grade II* are "particularly important buildings of more than special interest"; and those in Grade II are "nationally important and of special interest". Very few buildings are included in Grade I — only 2.5% of the total. Grade II* buildings represent 5.5% of the total, while the great majority, 92%, are included in Grade II.

Liverpool contains more than 1,550 listed buildings, of which 28 are in Grade I, 109 in Grade II*, and the rest in Grade II. (Note: These figures are taken from a search in the National Heritage List for England in May 2013, and are subject to variation as further buildings are listed, grades are revised, or buildings are delisted.) This list contains the Grade II listed buildings in the L15 postal district of Liverpool. The district is residential, covering the Wavertree area of Liverpool. Most of the listed buildings are houses, or structures associated with houses. Other listed buildings include a 15th-century well, public houses, a village lock-up, a memorial clock tower, a library, churches, a chapel, a war memorial, a former cinema, and a community centre.

Grade II listed buildings from other areas in the city can be found through the box on the right, along with the lists of the Grade I and Grade II* buildings in the city.

== Buildings ==
| Name | Location | Photograph | Built | Notes |
|---|---|---|---|---|
| Wavertree Lock-up | Childwall Road; 53.39830°N 2.91443°W | | 1796 | The lock-up is an octagonal stone building in two storeys. At the top is a cornice, four gables, and a pyramidal roof with a weathervane added by James Picton. On the south side is a round-headed entrance. There are blind windows in both floors. |
| Mossfield | Childwall Road; 53.3980°N 2.9098°W | — | Mid 19th century | A Neoclassical stuccoed house with a hipped slate roof. The ground floor is rusticated. The house is in two storeys, and each side has three bays. The windows are sashes with architraves. On the top of the house is a triglyph frieze. The porch is flanked by flat pilasters. On the left side are rectangular bay windows with balconies above. |
| Picton Clock Tower | Childwall Road; 53.39817°N 2.91578°W | | 1884 | The clock tower was designed by James Picton as a memorial to his wife who had died in 1879. It is in Renaissance style, and is built in stone. The tower has three stages, with a rusticated base on three steps. The bottom stage contains inscribed plaques and roundels, with urns at the corners. The middle stage has round-headed windows, and in the top stage is a clock face on each side. On top of the tower is a lead cupola with a short spire. Standing at the corners of the tower are four lamp posts carrying lanterns, and with dolphins at the bases. |
| Thornhill | 1 Childwall Road; 53.3978°N 2.9117°W | — | Mid 19th century | A stuccoed house with a slate roof. It is in an L-plan, and has two storeys and an attic, and a porch in the angle. The gables have pediments, each containing a round window. On the right side is a canted bay window. The windows in the ground floor are casements and those in the upper floor are sashes. |
| Thornhill | 10 Childwall Road; 53.3977°N 2.9115°W | — | Mid 19th century | A pair of stuccoed houses with a hipped slate roof. It is in two storeys and each house has a two-bay front. The end bays project forward and have rectangular bay windows, angle pilasters, a cornice and a first floor balcony. The windows are sashes. |
| Former Abbey Cinema | Church Road North; 53.3978°N 2.9148°W | | 1937–39 | The cinema on a corner site, later used for other purposes, has a steel and brick core, with the exterior in brown brick and concrete with faience dressings. The entrance is in the west corner and consists of a semicircular projection in glass and faience, flanked by circular turrets, and has three doorways and a curving canopy. There are various projections on the northwest and southwest fronts. |
| Progressive Synagogue | 28 Church Road North; 53.3965°N 2.9158°W | — | Mid 18th century | This originated as a merchant's house. It is built in red brick on a stone plinth with stone and stucco dressings. It has two storeys and a five-bay front with flanking wings. At the top is a frieze and a cornice. The windows are sashes with rusticated wedge lintels. In the garden is a post-war synagogue. |
| — | 45 and 47 Fieldway; 53.4026°N 2.9022°W | — | 1913 | A pair of two-storey semi-detached houses in Wavertree Garden Suburb designed by G. L. Sutcliffe. They are in brick, partly roughcast, and have steeply hipped red tile roofs. The doors are in the centre and the windows are casements. In the upper floor of each house is a tall window in a half-dormer with a weatherboarded gable, which is flanked by smaller windows. |
| — | 46 and 48 Fieldway; 53.4028°N 2.9011°W | — | c. 1914 | A pair of two-storey semi-detached houses in Wavertree Garden Suburb designed by G. L. Sutcliffe. They are in brick, partly roughcast, and have steeply hipped red tile roofs. The doors are in the centre and the windows are casements. In the upper floor of each house is a tall window in a half-dormer with a weatherboarded gable, which is flanked by smaller windows. |
| — | 49–56 Fieldway; 53.4027°N 2.9017°W | — | c. 1914 | A group of eight houses which form the central block of the main square of Wavertree Garden Suburb. They were designed by G. L. Sutcliffe, and are in brick, partly roughcast, with red tile roofs. They form a symmetrical block, with four houses on each side, joined by a timber bridge. The original windows were casements, but some have been replaced. |
| — | 2–16 Gordon Place; 53.3800°N 2.9155°W | — | Late 19th century | A terrace of eight houses in common brick with red brick and stone dressings. They have Welsh slate roofs, are in two storeys, and each house is in a single bay. At the top of the building is a brick cornice. The windows have wedge lintels; most are 20th-century casements, but two houses have sash windows. |
| — | 1–9 Grove Street; 53.3993°N 2.9206°W | — | c. 1850 | A terrace of five brick houses with slate roofs. They are in two storeys, and each house has two bays. No. 9 projects forwards, and has a rendered ground floor with a shop front. The windows have wedge lintels, and most are casements. |
| Telephone kiosk | High Street | — | 1935 | A K6 type telephone kiosk, designed by Giles Gilbert Scott. It is constructed in cast iron, with a square plan and domed roof. In the panels around the top are three unperforated crowns. |
| — | 22 and 24 High Street; 53.3988°N 2.9211°W | — | Early 19th century | A pair of brick houses on a stone base with stone dressings and a slate roof. They have two storeys and each house has a three-bay front. At the top of the building is a cornice. The windows are sashes with wedge lintels. Steps lead up to the central entrances, each of which has a Tuscan porch. |
| — | 26 High Street; 53.3987°N 2.9209°W | — | Early 19th century | A brick house with stone dressings and a slate roof. It has two storeys and a three-bay front. The windows are sashes with wedge lintels. The central entrance has a doorcase and a fanlight. |
| — | 28 High Street; 53.3987°N 2.9207°W | — | Early 19th century | A brick house on a rusticated stone base, with stone dressings and a slate roof. It has two storeys and a three-bay front. The windows are sashes with wedge lintels. At the central entrance is a Tuscan porch. |
| — | 30 and 32 High Street; 53.3986°N 2.9205°W | — | Early 19th century | A pair of brick houses with stone dressings and slate roofs. They have three storeys and a three-bay front. The windows are sashes with wedge lintels. The entrances have doorcases with fluted pilasters. |
| — | 34 High Street; 53.3986°N 2.9205°W | — | Early 19th century | A stuccoed house, later converted into a shop. It has two storeys and a three-bay front. Between the floors is a frieze and a cornice. The central bay in the upper floor projects forward and has a pediment. All the windows are 20th-century casements. |
| Rose Cottage | 35 High Street; 53.39898°N 2.92026°W | — | Late 18th century | A brick house with stone dressings and a slate roof. It has two storeys and a two-bay front. The windows are sashes with wedge lintels. At the centre is a timber porch and a doorway with an architrave. |
| — | 38, 40 and 42 High Street; 53.3986°N 2.9201°W | — | Late 18th century | A terrace of three stuccoed houses with a hipped slate roof. They have two storeys and a five-bay front. The end bays and the central bay project forward; the end bays are flanked by giant pilasters. Most of the windows are sashes. The central entrance has an architrave. The other entrances are on the sides, and are flanked by pilasters. |
| Wavertree Town Hall | 89 High Street; 53.3986°N 2.9177°W | | 1872 | The former town hall is built in stuccoed stone, and was designed by John Elliott Reeve in Neoclassical style. It has two storeys and a five-bay front. In the central bay is a porch with four Ionic columns. Above this is a balcony with a balustrade and four Corinthian columns carrying an entablature with a triangular pediment. Above the other bays runs a balustrade. The windows are sashes. Those on the ground floor have keystones carved with fruit. Between the windows on the upper floor are Corinthian pilasters. |
| Lamb Hotel | 111 High Street; 53.3985°N 2.9165°W | — | 1850s | A brick public house with stone dressings and a slate roof in Georgian style. It has a three-storey three-bay central portion, with lateral two-storey, three-bay wings; the wings project forward under pediments. At the top of the central part is a frieze and a cornice. There is a central round-headed entrance with a Doric porch carried on granite columns. The right bay has a bay window with a pediment; the left bay contains an elliptical cart entrance. |
| Memorial Church of the Protestant Martyrs | Lawrence Road; 53.3980°N 2.93827°W | | 1902–03 | The church was built for the United Methodist Church, used by the Free Presbyterian Church of Ulster from 1982, and closed in 2004. It is in Edwardian Italianate Baroque style, and built in red brick with stone dressings, and a Welsh slate roof with red ridge tiles. The church has a rectangular plan with schoolrooms in the basement. The entrance front is pedimented, and has a pedimented porch on the left, and a tower on the right. The tower contains the entrance that is approached by steps, and has a semicircular fanlight with a hood carried on scroll brackets. Above is an octagonal stage with round-headed windows and scroll buttresses, and this is surmounted by a copper-clad ogee-shaped dome. Along the sides are round-headed windows. |
| St Mary's Church | North Drive; 53.4007°N 2.9199°W | | 1872–73 | This originated as a Methodist church, and additions including a steeple were made in the 1880s. It was damaged during the First World War, renovated in 1925, but closed as a Methodist church in 1950, being re-opened as an Anglican church in 1952. It is built in sandstone with a slate roof, and consists of a nave, short transepts, a canted east end, and a northeast tower with a broach spire. |
| — | 18 and 20 North Drive; 53.4009°N 2.9170°W | — | 1860s | A pair of brick houses with decorative brickwork and stone dressings. The houses are in two storeys with basements and attics, and each house has three bays. The end bays project forward under gables with decorative bargeboards. These bays have canted bay windows, with iron balconies on the first floor. The windows in the central bays have pointed heads in gabled half-dormers. All the windows are sashes. At the rear are a stable and a coach house. |
| — | 29 and 31 North Drive; 53.4013°N 2.9169°W | — | 1867 | A pair of brick houses with decorative brickwork and stone dressings. The houses are in two storeys with basements and attics, and each house has two bays, the end bays being canted. The attics contain windows with pointed heads in gabled half-dormers. All the windows are sashes. The entrances are in porches on the sides. |
| Cross and Passion Convent | 33 North Drive; 53.4013°N 2.9166°W | — | 1860s | A brick house with decorative brickwork, stone dressings, and a painted plaster frieze. It has two storeys and a front of three bays. In the ground floor are canted bay windows with stone lintels and cornices. All the windows are sashes. In the centre is a round-headed entrance. |
| — | 35 North Drive; 53.4012°N 2.9163°W | — | 1860s | A brick house with stone dressings, and a slate roof. It has two storeys and a basement, and a front of three bays. In the ground floor is a projecting window on the left and a canted bay window on the right. There are pierced balconies on the first floor, and the windows are all sashes. The doorway has a Corinthian aedicule with a segmental pediment. |
| Monk's Well | Mill Lane; 53.39968°N 2.91472°W | | 1414 | The well now consists mainly, or completely, of later work. It is constructed in red sandstone and consists of plinth with an arch and a cross on the top. There are Latin inscriptions on the plinth and the cross. |
| Sandy Knowe | Mill Lane; 53.4030°N 2.9135°W | — | 1847 | A stone house with a slate roof designed by Sir James Picton for his own use. It has since been converted into flats. The house is in two storeys with and attic, and has an L-shaped plan. There is an octagonal turret in the angle, and an octagonal extension to the southeast. Most of the windows are mullioned. Other features include shaped gables with finials, and a frieze with a Latin inscription and the date. |
| Olive Mount Villas | 1 and 2 Mill Lane; 53.4033°N 2.9135°W | — | 1840s | A pair of stuccoed houses with a slate roof. They are in two storeys with attics, and each house has two bays, the central bays projecting under a gable. The windows are casements. The entrances have four-centred arches. |
| Olive Mount Villas | 3 and 4 Mill Lane; 53.4035°N 2.9135°W | — | 1840s | A pair of stuccoed houses with a slate roof. They are in two storeys, and each house has three bays, the end bays being recessed. The windows are sashes with architraves. |
| Olive Mount Villas | 5 and 6 Mill Lane; 53.4038°N 2.9135°W | — | 1850s | A pair of stuccoed houses with a slate roof. They are in two storeys with attics, and have four bays, the third bay having a gable. The windows are sashes. |
| Olive Mount Villas | 7 and 8 Mill Lane; 53.4040°N 2.9136°W | — | 1850s | A pair of stuccoed houses with a slate roof. They are in two storeys, and each house has two bays, the end bays projecting forward. At the top of the building is an entablature and a frieze decorated with wreathes. The windows are sashes with architraves. |
| Original house, Olive Mount Children's Hospital | Old Mill Lane; 53.4010°N 2.9120°W | — | Late 18th century | A stone house with two storeys and a front of five bays; the right side extends for eight bays. The windows are sashes. At the centre is a single-storey porch carried on paired columns with a first-floor balcony. |
| Newstead | 14 Old Mill Lane; 53.4005°N 2.9136°W | — | 1873 | A stuccoed house with a slate roof in Italianate style. It is in two storeys and has a three-bay front. On the entrance front, the first bay has an open pediment, and the porch has rusticated pilasters. At a rear angle is an octagonal three-stage tower with a battlemented parapet. Adjacent to this is a two-storey iron veranda and conservatory. |
| Wall and gate piers, Newstead | 14 Old Mill Lane; 53.40062°N 2.91386°W | — | 1873 | The wall and the gate piers are in stone. The wall are coped, and the gate piers are chamfered, with anthemion caps and ball finials. |
| Bloomfield House and Eastgate | 42 and 44 Olive Lane; 53.4036°N 2.9149°W | — | 1850s | A pair of stuccoed houses with slate roofs. They are in two storeys, each house having two bays facing the road. The central two bays project forward under a pediment. The windows are sashes. There are pediments on each side, and each house has a porch, again with a pediment. |
| Rooklands and Westfield | 46 and 48 Olive Lane; 53.4039°N 2.9150°W | — | c 1850 | A pair of stuccoed houses with slate roofs. They are in two storeys, each house having four bays. The lateral two bays project forward under pediments. The windows are all sashes with architraves. |
| — | 1, 3 and 5 Orford Street; 4 Sandown Lane; 53.3995°N 2.9218°W | Orford Street | c 1850 | Four brick houses with stone dressings and a hipped slate roof. They are in two storeys, and each house has two bays. The windows have wedge lintels and are a mixture of sashes and casements. The entrances are round-headed with Doric doorcases. |
| Edinburgh Public House | 2–6 Orford Street; 2 Sandown Lane; 53.3997°N 2.9219°W | centra | c 1850 | This consists of a public house and three attached houses. The public house is stuccoed, and the houses are in brick with stone dressings and a hipped slate roof. The building is in two storeys. The public house has three bays, and each house is in two bays. All the windows have wedge lintels; those in the public house are sashes, and the houses have a mixture of sash and casement windows. |
| — | 7–15 Orford Street; 53.3997°N 2.9214°W | — | c 1850 | A terrace of five brick houses with a slate roof. At the top of the building is a cornice. They are in two storeys, and each house has two bays. The windows have wedge lintels and are a mixture of sashes and casements. |
| — | 8–14 Orford Street; 53.3995°N 2.9215°W | — | c 1850 | A terrace of four brick houses with a slate roof. At the top of the building is a frieze and a cornice. They are in two storeys, and each house has one bay. The windows have wedge lintels and are a mixture of sashes and casements. The entrances are round-headed with Doric doorcases. |
| — | 16–34 Orford Street; 11 Grove Street; 53.3995°N 2.9210°W | — | c 1850 | A terrace of 12 brick houses with stone dressings and a slate roof. At the top of the building is a frieze and a cornice. The houses are in two storeys, and each house has one bay. The windows have wedge lintels and most are casements. The entrances are round-headed with doorcases. |
| — | 17–25 Orford Street; 53.3997°N 2.9212°W | — | c 1850 | A terrace of five brick houses with a slate roof. They are in two storeys, and each house has two bays. The windows have wedge lintels and most are sashes. The entrances are round-headed and most have consoled doorcases. |
| — | 27 and 29 Orford Street; 53.3997°N 2.9207°W | — | c 1850 | A pair of brick houses with stone dressings and a slate roof. They are in two storeys, and each house has a single bay with a ground floor bay window. The windows have wedge lintels; No. 27 has casements, and No. 29 has sashes. The entrances have angle pilasters and entablatures. |
| — | 31–37 Orford Street; 53.3997°N 2.9205°W | — | c 1850 | A terrace of four brick houses with stone dressings and a slate roof. They are in two storeys, and each house has a single bay. The windows are a mix of casements and sashes, with wedge lintels. The doorways are in pairs, with a blind window above each pair. |
| — | 199 Picton Road; 53.39945°N 2.92262°W | — | Early 19th century | A brick house with stone dressings and a slate roof. It has two storeys and a three-bay front. At the top of the house is a cornice. The windows are sashes with wedge lintels. The entrance is in the centre and is round-headed. |
| — | 238 Picton Road; 53.39960°N 2.92543°W | — | Mid 19th century | A stone house with stone dressings and a slate roof. It is in two storeys and has a front of a single bay. The windows are sashes with wedge lintels. At the top of the house is a cornice. |
| — | 240 Picton Road; 53.3996°N 2.9252°W | — | Mid 19th century | A former brewery and malt kiln, built in brick with stone dressings, and with a slate roof. It has three storeys, and a seven-bay front. The outer two bays on each side project forward under a pediment. At the top of the building is a frieze, a cornice and a gable. The windows are casements and have wedge lintels. |
| Wavertree District Library | 244 Picton Road; 53.3993°N 2.9246°W | | 1902–03 | The library was designed by Thomas Shelmerdine in the style of the 17th and 18th centuries. It is built in red brick with stone dressings, and has a slate roof. The library is in a single storey, and has a symmetrical three-bay front. The outer bays project forward with gables, and each contains a three-light window, with a three-light lunette above. The central bay has an entrance flanked by four Ionic columns, with a pediment. Above this is a balustrade, and a recessed shaped gable containing a two-light window with a pediment. |
| Wall and gate piers, Wavertree District Library | 244 Picton Road; 53.39948°N 2.92447°W | — | 1902–03 | There are nine piers in the wall and at the gateways in front of the library. They are in brick, have a square plan, and are panelled and rusticated. Their caps have Doric entablatures. Between the piers is stone walling with railings. |
| Picton Sports Centre | 246 Picton Road, 2 Glynn Street; 53.3992°N 2.9242°W | — | 1904–06 | This was originally the public baths, designed by W. R. Court with Thomas Shelmerdine. It is built in red brick and painted stone, with a hipped slate roof. The building is in two storeys, and has a three-bay front. The end bays project forward, and contain four-light windows under gables. The central bay contains a wide elliptical arch, above which is a recessed six-bay mullioned window. On the right side is a two-storey, two-bay house. |
| College of Further Education | 260 Picton Road; 53.3991°N 2.9232°W | | 1898–99 | Originally a technical institute, then a college, and then offices, designed by Thomas Shelmerdine. It is built in red brick with stone dressings and a slate roof. The building has two storeys, and extends for five bays, the first bay being canted with a gable containing a lunette. The entrance is in the second bay. It has a granite Ionic aedicule with rusticated columns, a frieze and a pediment with a tympanum containing a fanlight. The windows are mullioned and transomed. |
| — | 9, 11 and 13 Prince Alfred Road; 53.3980°N 2.9183°W | — | Early 19th century | Three brick houses with slate roofs. They are in two storeys, each house being in one bay. Most of the windows are sashes, the others being casements. |
| — | 15 and 17 Prince Alfred Road; 53.3979°N 2.9182°W | — | Early 19th century | A pair of brick houses with stone dressings and a slate roof. They have two storeys and a basement, and each house is in a single bay. The windows and entrances have wedge lintels; the windows are casements. |
| — | 27–35 Prince Alfred Road; 53.3974°N 2.9179°W | | Early 19th century | A terrace of five stuccoed houses in two storeys, with basements and attics. Each house has two bays, other than No. 35 which has three bays, its central bay protruding forward. The windows are casements. No 35. has a porch with paired pilasters and an entablature. |
| Sandown Terrace | 12–34 Sandown Lane; 53.4003°N 2.9213°W | | 1836–46 | A terrace of seven stuccoed houses with slate roofs. They are in two storeys with basements, and each house has two bays. The terrace is symmetrical, the outer two and the central two projecting forward, the latter under a pediment. The pediment has a tympanum painted with arabesques. The windows are sashes. |
| — | 35 and 37 Sandown Lane; 53.40122°N 2.92156°W | — | 1836–46 | A pair of brick houses with stone dressings and a slate roof. They are in three storeys with basements, and each house has two bays. There is a first floor sill band and, at the top of the houses, is a frieze and a cornice. The windows are sashes with wedge lintels. Each house has a round-headed doorway with a Doric doorcase. |
| — | 47 and 49 Sandown Lane; 53.40158°N 2.92141°W | — | 1836–46 | A pair of brick houses with stone dressings and a slate roof. They are in three storeys with basements, and each house has two bays. There is a first floor sill band and, at the top of the houses, is a frieze and a cornice. The windows are sashes with wedge lintels. Each house has a round-headed doorway with a Doric doorcase. |
| — | 66 Sandown Lane; 53.4030°N 2.9211°W | — | Mid 19th century | A stuccoed house with a slate roof. It has two storeys with a basement, and has a three-bay front. The end bays project forward, and are bowed. At the top of the house is a bracketed frieze and a cornice. The windows are sashes. The central round-headed doorway has rusticated pilasters, and an entablature above which is a balustered balcony. |
| — | 69 and 71 Sandown Lane; 53.4030°N 2.9200°W | — | Mid 19th century | A pair of stuccoed houses with a hipped slate roof. They are in two storeys, and each house has two bays. The end bays project forward and contain canted bay windows. The entrances are on the sides. Each of these is round-headed with an archivolt and a keystone, decorated spandrels, a panelled frieze, and a segmental pediment. |
| — | 87 Sandown Lane; 53.4025°N 2.9207°W | — | Mid 19th century | A former lodge, stuccoed with a hipped slate roof. It is in a single storey, with a front and sides of three bays. On the front, the central bay is canted, and contains windows in architraves with friezes and segmental pediments. All the windows are casements. |
| — | 7 and 9 Shanklin Road; 53.4033°N 2.9212°W | — | Mid 19th century | A pair of stuccoed houses with slate roofs. They are in two storeys, and each house has a front of three bays. The ground floor windows, and the first floor windows in the end bays, project forward and have canted angles. The doorways are round-headed, with a balustraded balcony above. All the windows are sashes. |
| — | 12 Shanklin Road; 50 Sandown Lane; 53.4035°N 2.9204°W | — | Mid 19th century | A pair of houses in two storeys with attics. The ground floor is stuccoed, the upper floor is in brick, and the roof is slated. Each house has three bays, the end bays projecting forward with attics in gables, and containing canted bay windows. The windows are sashes with architraves. Between the central bay on each floor is a niche. The entrances are on the sides and have antae. |
| Royal Hotel | Smithdown Road; 53.3953°N 2.9389°W | — | Mid 19th century | A brick public house with stone dressings, and a hipped slate roof in three storeys. It has three bays on both street fronts, and a canted bay on the corner. The ground floor is faced with polychrome tiles. The windows in the ground floor are casements; those on the upper floors are sashes with wedge lintels. |
| War Memorial | South Drive; 53.40073°N 2.91959°W | | c. 1920 | The war memorial is in the churchyard of St Mary's Church. It was originally in the churchyard of the previous St Mary's Church on another site that was destroyed in the Second World War. The war memorial was moved to its present site in about 1952. It is in stone, and consists of a triangular plinth on a triangular base. On the plinth is a triangular pedestal that is surmounted by a tapering hexagonal column. On the sides of the war memorial are stone plaques with inscriptions and the names of the fallen in both world wars. |
| Wavertree Garden Suburb Institute | Thingwall Road; 53.4014°N 2.9022°W | — | Early 19th century | This originated as two houses, which were converted into an institute in 1924. The building is in stone with a slate roof. It has two storeys and a two-bay front. At the corners are large flush quoins. Facing the road is a gable containing a roundel. On the left side is a porch with a hipped roof. |
| Methodist Chapel | Wellington Avenue; 53.3949°N 2.9333°W | | 1904 | This was built as a Methodist Sunday school, and later converted into a chapel. It is in red brick with yellow terracotta dressings, and has a slate roof. The building is in a single storey. The entrance front has three central bays, flanked by a smaller bay and a porch on each side. At the top of the central portion is a pediment with ball finials. All the windows are round-headed, with archivolts and keystones. The porches contain flat-headed entrances. |
| Sikh Community Centre | Wellington Avenue; 53.3948°N 2.9334°W | | 1904 | This was built as a Methodist chapel. It is in red brick with yellow terracotta dressings, and has a slate roof. The building is in two storeys, and has an entrance front of four bays. In the central bays are two round-headed doorways with archivolts, and decorated pilasters and spandrels. The windows in the upper storey are also round-headed; those in the ground floor have segmental heads. At the top of the central bays is a pediment with a moulded tympanum and a finial. |
| — | 2 Wellington Avenue; 2 Wellington Fields; 53.3936°N 2.9345°W | — | c. 1840s | A pair of stuccoed houses with a hipped slate roof. They have two storeys, and each house is in two bays. At the corners are rusticated quoins. There are cornices at the top of the house, and above the round-headed doorways. |
| — | 12 and 14 Wellington Avenue; 53.3946°N 2.9337°W | — | Early 19th century | A pair of stuccoed houses with a slate roof. They have two storeys and extend for five bays. At the top of the building is a cornice. The windows are sashes. There are round-headed entrances in the second and fourth bays with Doric doorcases and fanlights. |
| — | 3 and 5 Wellington Fields; 53.3938°N 2.9338°W | — | Mid 19th century | A pair of stuccoed houses with a slate roof. They have two storeys and extend for four bays. There are gables over the second and fourth bays with decorative bargeboards and finials. No. 3 has a ground floor French window, and No. 5 has a ground floor canted bay window. |

== See also ==
Architecture of Liverpool

== References and notes ==
Notes

Citations

Sources

- Pollard, Richard; Pevsner, Nikolaus (2006), Lancashire: Liverpool and the South-West, The Buildings of England, New Haven and London: Yale University Press, ISBN 0-300-10910-5
