= Susan Einzig =

English children's illustrator (1922–2009)

- Einzig in 2006
- Born: Suzanne Henriette Einzig; 16 November 1922; Dahlem, Berlin, Germany
- Died: 25 December 2009 (aged 87); Chelsea, London, England
- Education: Central School of Art and Design
- Known for: Book illustration
- Notable work: Tom's Midnight Garden, 1958
- Children: 2

Suzanne Henriette Einzig (16 November 1922 – 25 December 2009) was a British illustrator, painter, printmaker and art teacher. She is best known for illustrating the children's book Tom's Midnight Garden by Philippa Pearce.

== Biography ==
Einzig's cover illustration for the children's fantasy novel Tom's Midnight Garden by Philippa Pearce, 1958

Einzig was born Suzanne Henriette Einzig on 16 November 1922 in Dahlem, Berlin, into an affluent Jewish family. Her father, the managing director of a clothing company, encouraged her artistic talents, and at the age of 15 she began studying art at the Breuer School of Design. Two years later she travelled to England on one of the last Kindertransport trains before the outbreak of the Second World War. She was joined by her brother, and later by her mother, but her father died in Theresienstadt concentration camp.

Living with family friends in Hampstead Garden Suburb in London, she enrolled at the Central School of Arts and Crafts, where she studied wood engraving under Gertrude Hermes and John Farleigh, and drawing and illustration under Bernard Meninsky, William Roberts and Maurice Kesselman. In 1942 she was conscripted to work in an aircraft factory, and later worked as a technical draughtsman for the War Office.

After the war she found work as an illustrator. In 1945 she was commissioned by Noel Carrington to illustrate a children's book, Mary Belinda and the Ten Aunts by Norah Pulling, using the technique of autolithography in which the artist draws directly on the printing surface, using a separate plate for each of six colours. Other books she illustrated include Sappho: a Picture of Life in Paris by Alphonse Daudet (1954), Tom's Midnight Garden by Philippa Pearce (1958), which won the 1959 Carnegie Medal (see figure), and The Bastables by E. Nesbit (1966), a new edition. She also worked for magazines like Lilliput, Picture Post and House and Garden, and was a regular illustrator for the Radio Times from about 1948.

To supplement her income she worked part-time as a tutor at the Camberwell School of Art, where her students included Euan Uglow and Terry Scales, as well as ex-servicemen, including the musicians Humphrey Lyttelton and Wally Fawkes. Among her colleagues were the painter and illustrator John Minton, who was an important influence on her work, and Keith Vaughan. From 1959 until 1988 she was a lecturer, later a senior lecturer, at Chelsea School of Art and Design, where her students included the illustrators Sue Coe and Emma Chichester Clark and the actor Alan Rickman.

She continued to work as an illustrator and a fine artist. Her prints were exhibited with the Artichocke Print Workshop, and her paintings at the Royal Academy, the Victoria and Albert Museum, the Barbican Art Gallery and elsewhere in the UK and abroad. In her later years she lived in Fulham, London, and died of heart failure at the Royal Brompton Hospital, Chelsea, on 25 December 2009. She was unmarried and had two children.

== Books illustrated ==
- Norah Pulling, Mary Belinda and the Ten Aunts, 1945
- Norah Pulling, Miss Richard's Mouse, 1946
- Eduard Mörike, Mozart on the Way to Prague, 1946
- Rex Warner, The Vengeance of the Gods, Macgibbon & Kee, 1954
- Alphonse Daudet, Sappho: a Picture of Life in Paris, The Folio Society, 1954
- Valerie Hastings, Jo and the Skiffle Group, Max Parrish & Co, 1958
- Philippa Pearce, Tom's Midnight Garden, Oxford University Press, 1958
- Hester Burton, Her First Ball, Oxford University Press, 1959
- Gillian Avery, In the Window Seat: A Collection of Victorian Stories, Oxford University Press, 1960
- Margaret Love, An Explorer for an Aunt , Follett Publishing Company, 1960
- Eleanor Spence, Lillipilly Hill, Oxford University Press, 1960
- Eleanor Spence, The Green Laurel, Oxford University Press, 1963
- Elizabeth Poston, The Children's Songbook, 1961
- Charlotte Brontë, Jane Eyre, abridged by E. M. Atwood, Longmans, 1962
- Jane Gaskell, Attic Summer, Hodder & Stoughton, 1963
- Robert Gittings and Jo Manton, The Story of John Keats, E. P. Dutton & Co, 1963
- Meindert DeJong, The Tower by the Sea, Lutterworth Press, 1964
- E. Nesbit, The Bastables, Nonesuch Press, 1966
