= Minnow on the Say (novel) =

Children's novel by Philippa Pearce

- First edition
- Author: Philippa Pearce
- Illustrator: Edward Ardizzone
- Language: English
- Genre: Novel
- Published: 1955
- Publisher: Oxford University Press
- Publication place: United Kingdom
- ISBN: 0-486-29256-8
- OCLC: 71126926
- Dewey Decimal: 823.8
- LC Class: PR4172 .W7 2007

Minnow on the Say is a children's novel written by English writer Philippa Pearce, first published by Oxford University Press in 1955. Like many of her books, the novel is set in the area where she grew up, specifically in an old mill near Cambridge. It was published in the United States in 1958 under the title The Minnow Leads to Treasure. The novel has been twice adapted as a television drama.

== Plot ==
One summer in the 1930s, two boys use a canoe, the Minnow, on the Say River to search for a treasure concealed by an ancestor of one of the boys at the time of the Spanish Armada. They believe a short poem holds the clue to its location.

== Inspiration ==
Philippa Pearce grew up in an old mill house in Great Shelford. In 1951 Pearce spent a long period in a Cambridge hospital recovering from tuberculosis. She passed the time thinking about a canoe trip she had taken many years before, which became the inspiration for her first book. According to The Guardian, "She brightened the long days in bed by savouring in her imagination every second of a canoe trip on the river that had run beside the garden of that childhood home five miles away. Convalescing, she wove those memories into Minnow on the Say (1954) which, after being rejected by one publisher, became a runner-up for the Carnegie Medal."

It was inspired by the area where she had been raised: the villages of Great and Little Shelford became Great and Little Barley. Cambridge became Castleford in the book and lost its university; the River Cam became the River Say.

== Reception ==
Pamela Whitlock in The Spectator commented at the time of first publication: "Minnow on the Say will provide a fresh experience for readers who expect every book to whirl them into quick fire thrills. From its first pages they will become snared in a delightful web that is more than just a new adventure."

American writer Daria Donnelly commented in Commonweal in 2000: "Philipa Pearce's 1958 Tom's Midnight Garden [...] is considered one of the finest novels written for children, "as near as any book I know to being perfect in its construction and writing" according to critic John Rowe Townsend. But I think Pearce's recently republished first novel, Minnow on the Say [...] is even better."

It was a commended runner-up for the annual Carnegie Medal. In 1959, it was conferred the Lewis Carroll Shelf Award for books deemed to "belong on the same shelf" as Alice's Adventures in Wonderland and Through the Looking-Glass.

Children's Laureate Frank Cottrell-Boyce recommended the novel as part of BBC Radio 4's 2024 Children's Summer Book Club.

== Adaptations ==
Minnow on the Say, a Canadian TV drama based on the book, aired in 1960. In the UK, the story was read on Jackanory in 1966 and a BBC serial adaptation, Treasure over the Water, aired in 1972.
