= Minnow on the Say =

- Genre: Children's television
- Starring: Bill Duncan; James Lindsey; Barbara Tremaine; Teddy Walker
- Narrated by: Shirley Clothier
- Country of origin: Canada
- Original language: English
- No. of seasons: 1
- No. of episodes: 13

Original release
- Network: CBC Television
- Release: 1 April – 24 June 1960

Minnow on the Say is a Canadian children's adventure television series which aired on CBC Television in 1960. It is based on the 1955 novel of the same title by Philippa Pearce, who later wrote the classic Tom's Midnight Garden.

== Premise ==
This Vancouver-produced drama series featured two boys and their canoe, The Minnow, as they seek treasure along the Sayfor River. The treasure was buried in 1588 by an ancestor of the boys. Peter Statner adapted the story for broadcast.

== Scheduling ==
15-minute episodes were broadcast on Fridays at 5:00 p.m. from 1 April to 24 June 1960.
