= The Squirrel Wife =

1971 children's book

- Front cover art of 1971 first edition
- Author: Philippa Pearce
- Illustrator: Derek Collard
- Language: English
- Genre: Children's literature Fairy tale
- Published: 1971 by Longman Young Books
- Publication place: United Kingdom
- Media type: Print with linocut illustrations (Hardcover)
- Pages: 59 pp
- ISBN: 0-582-15263-1
- OCLC: 553738
- Dewey Decimal: 823.914
- LC Class: PZ8.P286

The Squirrel Wife is the title of a children's fairy tale written by Philippa Pearce and first illustrated by Derek Collard. This original fairy tale was published by Longman Young in 1971. Bill Geldart is responsible for illustrating publications made between 1983–1992 and Wayne Anderson most recently illustrated both New York and London publications in 2007. The Squirrel Wife is also included within The Faber Book of Modern Fairy Tales.

== Plot synopsis ==
On a dark and stormy night. Jack, a young swineherd, hears cries for help from amidst the storm ravaged trees. Ignoring the warnings of his wicked elder brother, he ventures into the forest. In reward for saving the life of a little green man that he finds trapped underneath a fallen tree, Jack is given a magic golden ring. Placed on the wrist of a newborn squirrel, this grants him the love of a nimble and wild eyed little squirrel wife. The only place for their life together as man and wife is in the forest where Jack builds their house and learns all there is to know about living in amidst the trees. However, it is not long before Jack's elder brother hears rumor of his young sibling's success and sets about bringing his good fortune to an end. With the aid of his squirrel wife and the lord of the little green forest people, Jack gets to live happily ever after whilst his elder brother is kept as a servant to the forest men so that he might learn some wisdom.
