= Henrietta Barnett School =

The Henrietta Barnett School
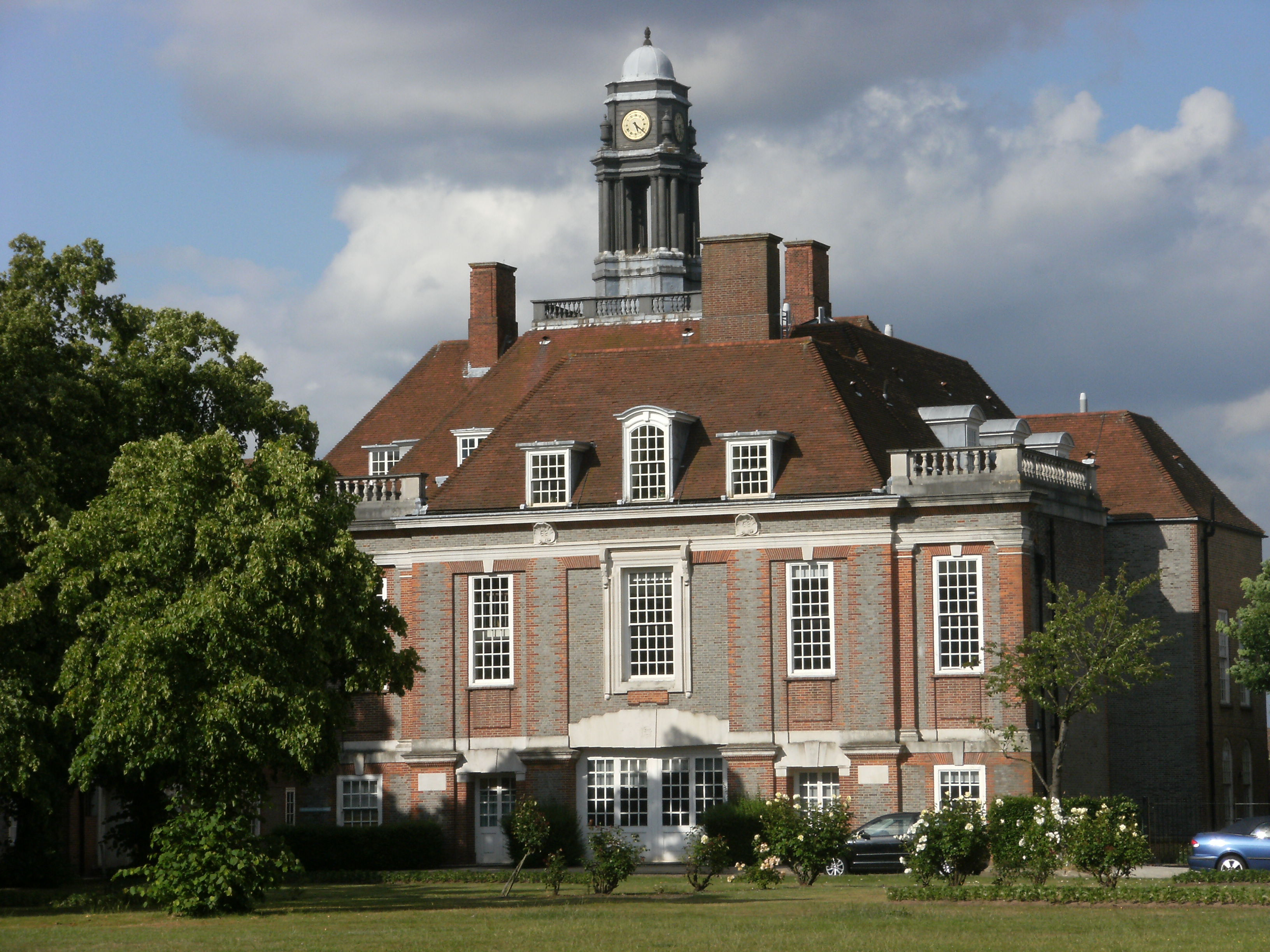

Location
- Central Square; Hampstead Garden Suburb, London, England, NW11 7BN; United Kingdom; 51°34′52″N 0°11′21″W

Information
- Type: Grammar academy
- Established: 1911; 115 years ago
- Founder: Dame Henrietta Barnett
- Department for Education URN: 138051 Tables
- Ofsted: Reports
- Head teacher: Emma MacLeod
- Staff: 100
- Gender: Girls
- Age: 11 to 18
- Enrolment: c. 750
- Publication: HBScientist; Quercus
- Alumnae: HBS Old Girls
- Website: http://www.hbschool.org.uk/

The Henrietta Barnett School is a grammar school with academy status for girls, in Hampstead Garden Suburb in London. The Good Schools Guide called the school 'One of the best academic state schools in the country, providing a gentle, inspiring education in a wonderful setting for very clever girls', and the school consistently ranks amongst the top state schools in educational league tables. The school was named among the 'magnificent seven' in 2005, following three mentions as being 'outstanding' in Ofsted's inspections. Following its latest Ofsted inspection in May 2022, the school was recategorised as "Good".

== History ==
It was founded in 1911 by Dame Henrietta Barnett for the education of girls. She wished to improve girls' education, which in her time, was at a low level. She believed in a society where girls had access to the same levels of education as those girls in more privileged sections of society. Indeed, when the school was founded, the now affluent Hampstead Garden Suburb was being developed for poor families to live in, and it was Barnett's wish to educate girls based on their natural ability, not their financial background.

Originally known as 'The Institute', the school was initially intended to enclose the North-East side of Central Square, according to Sir Edwin Lutyens' masterplan for the area, and the north wing was completed in 1911. John Soutar, the Hampstead Garden Suburb Trust's architect supervised construction of the south wing in 1923, while Lutyens designed the elevations for Crewe Hall, the central block. The building offered concerts, evening classes and debates until its conversion to the Henrietta Barnett School for Girls in the 1930s. The school is a Grade II* Listed Building.

== Present day ==
As of 2016, the school is ranked by The Telegraph as the best performing state school in the country, with GCSE and A Level results combined. The school placed 1st according to GCSE results and 2nd for A Level results. 96.13% of GCSE grades and 85.52% A Level grades achieved were A* or A.

In 2017 the school was featured as the case study in a Sunday Times article on the success of single-sex state schools.

Currently, Years 7 to 11 have cohort sizes of 104 students per year. External applicants are also admitted for the Sixth Form based on GCSE grades.

The school was previously awarded Music Specialist Status due to its outstanding music department, and became a Specialist Music College with English. Although awarded academy status in 2012, the school continues to specialise in Music and English.

The school offers all students participation in The Duke of Edinburgh's Award, at all levels. It also runs the Young Enterprise scheme annually.

In September 2007, the school opened a new multi-gym containing a variety of different exercise machines. In 2009 the school's science wing was completely refurbished to provide 8 modern labs. Sports facilities have also been improved, including the new multi-use games area (MUGA). In 2011 they received over £9 million to build state of the art facilities at the school. This building project has since been completed, providing the school with two outstanding new blocks: one for Music and Drama and the other for Design & Technology and Art, including two computer rooms. These also house teaching rooms for peripatetic music lessons, practice rooms and a café for older students. In December 2015, the new £350,000 library was opened.

== Academic achievement ==
In 2012, The Times newspaper ranked the school 1st and 2nd best achieving state school according to GCSE and A Level results, respectively.

In 2014, in an article by The Telegraph the school was identified as in the top ten schools for Russell Group applications with 75% of pupils winning places. The school was also listed as having the 7th highest rate of successful applications for Oxbridge, with 24% of pupils winning places, furthermore the school was the only state-grammar school listed, alongside ten independent schools, including Eton and Westminster.

In 2015 and 2016 the school was ranked as the best state school by The Telegraph based on their GCSE results, with 100% A* to C grades both years, 94.14% A* to A grades in 2015, and 96.13% A* to A grades in 2016. It also placed top in the annual Sunday Times Parent Power Table.

== Notable alumnae ==
- Jo Ankier, professional athlete
- Ros Altmann, Minister of State for Pensions (2015–2016)
- Michelle Brunner, professional bridge player, World Bridge Federation Life Champion, English Bridge Union Grand Master
- Helena Cronin, philosopher
- Natalie Evans, Baroness Evans of Bowes Park, Leader of the House of Lords (2016–2022)
- Patricia Finney, author
- Yvonne Green, poet, writer, barrister
- Anya Lahiri, singer and actress
- Susanna Lau, fashion blogger
- Dina Rabinovitch, journalist and writer
- Janet Radcliffe Richards, philosopher
- Ingrid Simler, Justice of the Supreme Court of the United Kingdom
- Lucie Skeaping, musician, radio presenter
- Sarah Solemani, actress and writer
- Miriam Solomon, philosopher
- Susie Steiner, novelist
- Audrey White, model and later Lady Wardington
- Lydia Wilson, actress
- Munira Wilson, Member of Parliament
- Debbie Wiseman, composer
