= Philippa Pearce =

English children's author (1920–2006)

Philippa Pearce OBE FRSL
- Pearce in an undated photo
- Born: Ann Philippa Pearce; 22 January 1920; Great Shelford, Cambridgeshire, England
- Died: 21 December 2006 (aged 86); Durham, England
- Occupation: Writer
- Writing career
- Period: 1955–2008
- Genres: Children's fantasy and supernatural fiction
- Notable work: Tom's Midnight Garden
- Notable awards: Carnegie Medal; 1958

Ann Philippa Pearce OBE FRSL (22 January 1920 – 21 December 2006) was an English author of children's books. Best known of those books is the time-slip novel Tom's Midnight Garden, which won the 1958 Carnegie Medal from the Library Association, as the year's outstanding children's book by a British subject. Pearce was a commended runner-up for the Medal a further four times. (Note: Since 1995 there are usually eight books on the Carnegie shortlist. According to CCSU some runners up through 2002 were Commended (from 1954) or Highly Commended (from 1966). There were about 160 commendations of both kinds in 49 years including five for 1955, three for 1977, three for 1978 and three for 1983 (one highly commended).)

== Early life ==
Ann Philippa Pearce was the youngest of four children of a flour miller and corn merchant, Ernest Alexander Pearce, and his wife Gertrude Alice née Ramsden, who lived at the Mill House by the River Cam in the village of Great Shelford, Cambridgeshire, where she was brought up. She started school only at the age of eight because of illness, then she went on to attend the Perse School for Girls in Cambridge and win a scholarship to Girton College, Cambridge to read English and History.

After gaining her degree, Pearce moved to London, where she found work as a civil servant. Later she wrote and produced schools' radio programmes for the BBC, where she remained for 13 years. She was a children's editor at the Oxford University Press from 1958 to 1960 and at the André Deutsch publishing firm from 1960 to 1967.

== Writing career ==
In 1951 Pearce spent a long period in hospital recovering from tuberculosis. She passed the time there thinking about a canoe trip she had taken many years before, which became the inspiration for her first book, a 241-page novel Minnow on the Say, published by Oxford in 1955 with illustrations by Edward Ardizzone. The book was a commended runner-up for the annual Carnegie Medal. Like several of her subsequent books, it was inspired by the area where she had grown up: the villages of Great and Little Shelford became Great and Little Barley. Cambridge became Castleford in the book (nothing to do with the real town of the same name in West Yorkshire) and lost its university; the River Cam became the River Say. Minnow was published in the US as The Minnow Leads to Treasure (1958). It was adapted for television in Canada as a 1960 TV series with the original title, and for British television in 1972 as Treasure over the Water.

Pearce's second book was Tom's Midnight Garden, published by Oxford in 1958. Its "midnight garden" was based directly on the garden of the Mill House where Pearce was raised. Pearce's advance for it was £1,000, which she thought "colossal". The novel has become one of the classic time-slip stories for children, initiated by Alison Uttley with A Traveller in Time in 1939. Tom's Midnight Garden inspired a film, a stage play and three TV series. It won the annual Carnegie Medal and for the 70th anniversary celebration in 2007, a panel named it one of the top ten Medal-winning works, which composed the ballot for a public election of the nation's favourite, in which Tom's Midnight Garden finished second in the vote, between two books that were about 40 years younger. (Note: Among votes cast from the UK, Northern Lights polled 40%, Tom's Midnight Garden 16%; Skellig 8%. The winning author, Philip Pullman, generously said: "Personally I feel they got the initials right but not the name. I don't know if the result would be the same in a hundred years' time; maybe Philippa Pearce would win then." •Ezard (2007).)

Pearce wrote over thirty books, including A Dog So Small (1962), The Squirrel Wife (1971), The Battle of Bubble and Squeak (1978) and The Way To Sattin Shore (1983). The Shadow Cage and other tales of the supernatural (1977), Bubble and Squeak, and Sattin Shore were the later three of her four Carnegie Medal runners-up. The Battle of Bubble and Squeak inspired a two-part television adaptation in Channel 4's Talk, Write and Read series of educational programming.

Although not a prolific writer of full-length books, Pearce continued to work over subsequent years, as well as speaking at conferences, editing anthologies and writing short stories. She attended a 2002 reception for children's authors at Number 10 Downing Street, the home of the Prime Minister.

In 2004 Pearce published her first new full-length book for two decades, The Little Gentleman. One further children's novel was published posthumously in 2008: A Finder's Magic.

== Personal life ==
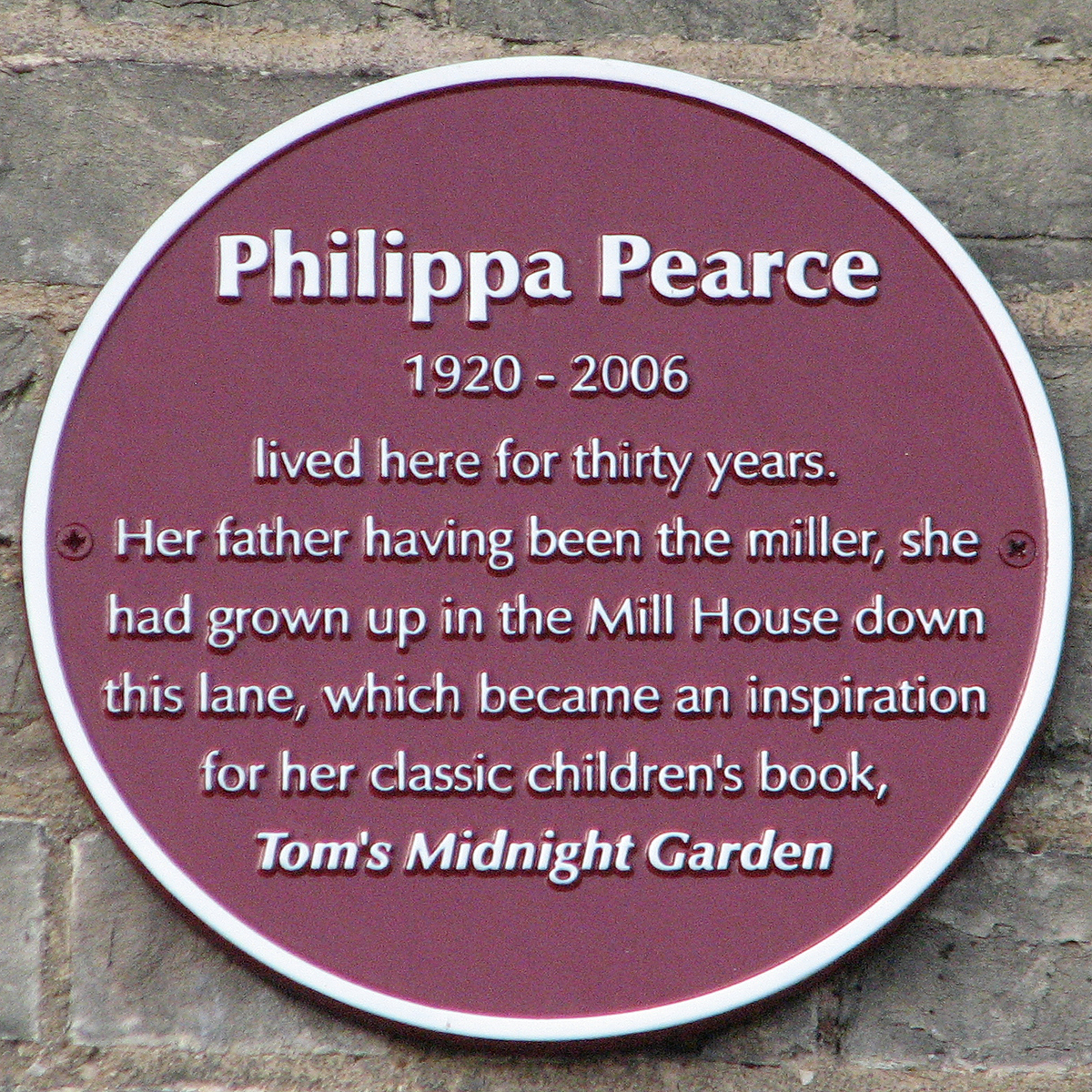
Memorial plaque on Philippa Pearce's former house, 4 Kings Mill Lane, in Great Shelford

Pearce married Martin Christie in 1962. They had one daughter, who became a children's author herself, as Sally Christie. Martin Christie, who had never wholly recovered from being a Japanese prisoner of war, died in 1964. From 1973 until her death from complications of a stroke in 2006, Philippa Pearce lived once again in Great Shelford, down the lane where she was raised.

== Legacy ==
Every September from 2008, the Philippa Pearce Lecture at Homerton College, Cambridge celebrates "excellence in writing for children and to emphasize its continuing vital importance." The lecturers are children's literature authors, scholars or critics, and most of the lectures are published online.

== Selected books ==
- Minnow on the Say, illustrated by Edward Ardizzone (1955); US title, The Minnow Leads to Treasure
- Tom's Midnight Garden, illustrated by Susan Einzig (1958)
- A Dog So Small (1962)
- The Children of Charlecote (1968)
- The Squirrel Wife, illustrated by Derek Collard (1971)
- What the Neighbours Did and Other Stories, illustrated by Faith Jaques, (1972)
- The Shadow Cage and Other Tales of the Supernatural (1977)
- The Battle of Bubble and Squeak (1978)
- The Way to Sattin Shore (1983)
- The Little Gentleman, illustrated by Patrick Benson (2004); US ed., illustrated by Tom Pohrt
- A Finder's Magic (2008)
