= Big Wood and Little Wood =

Small forested areas in London, England

Coordinates: 51.584°N 0.190°W

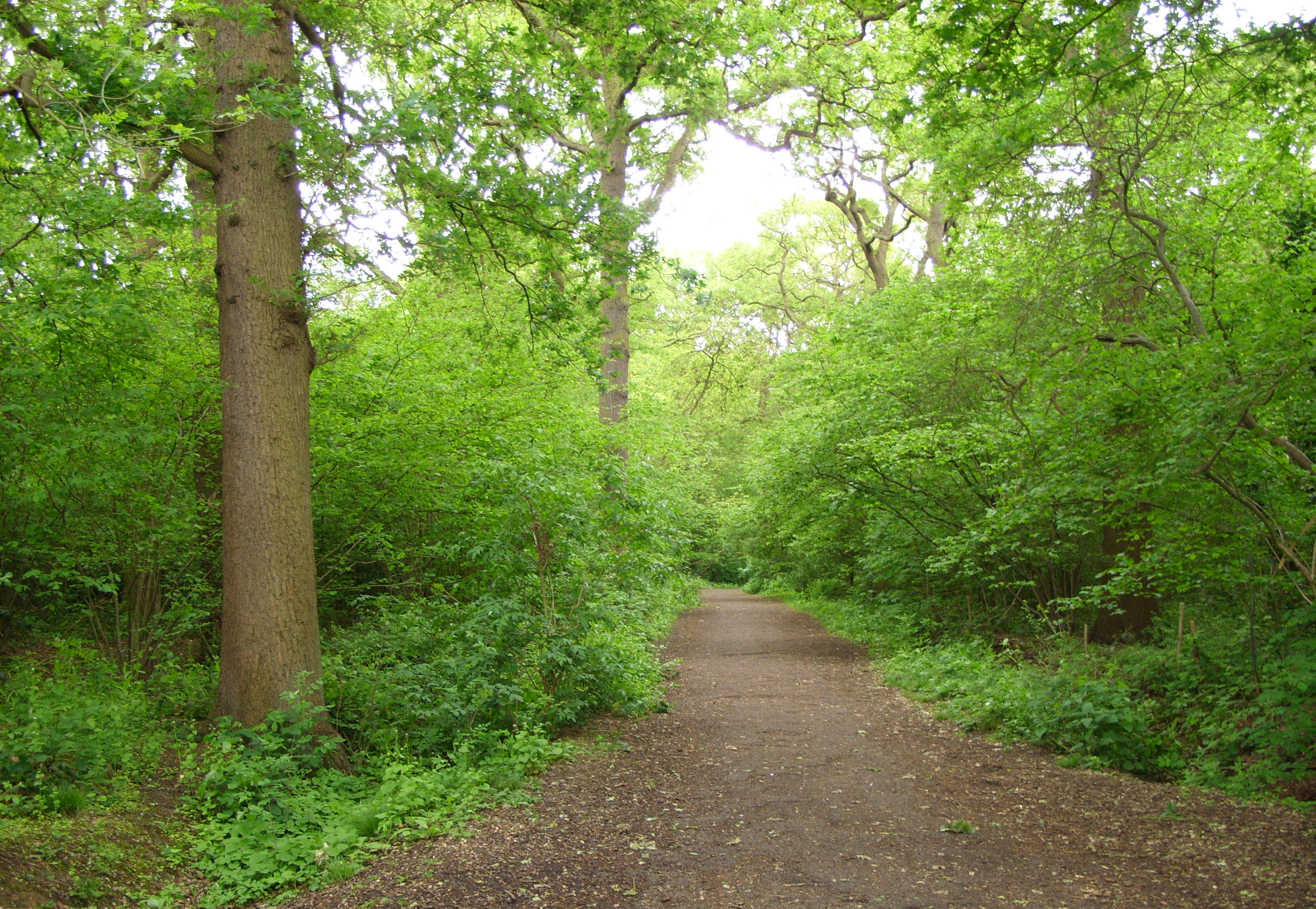
Big Wood

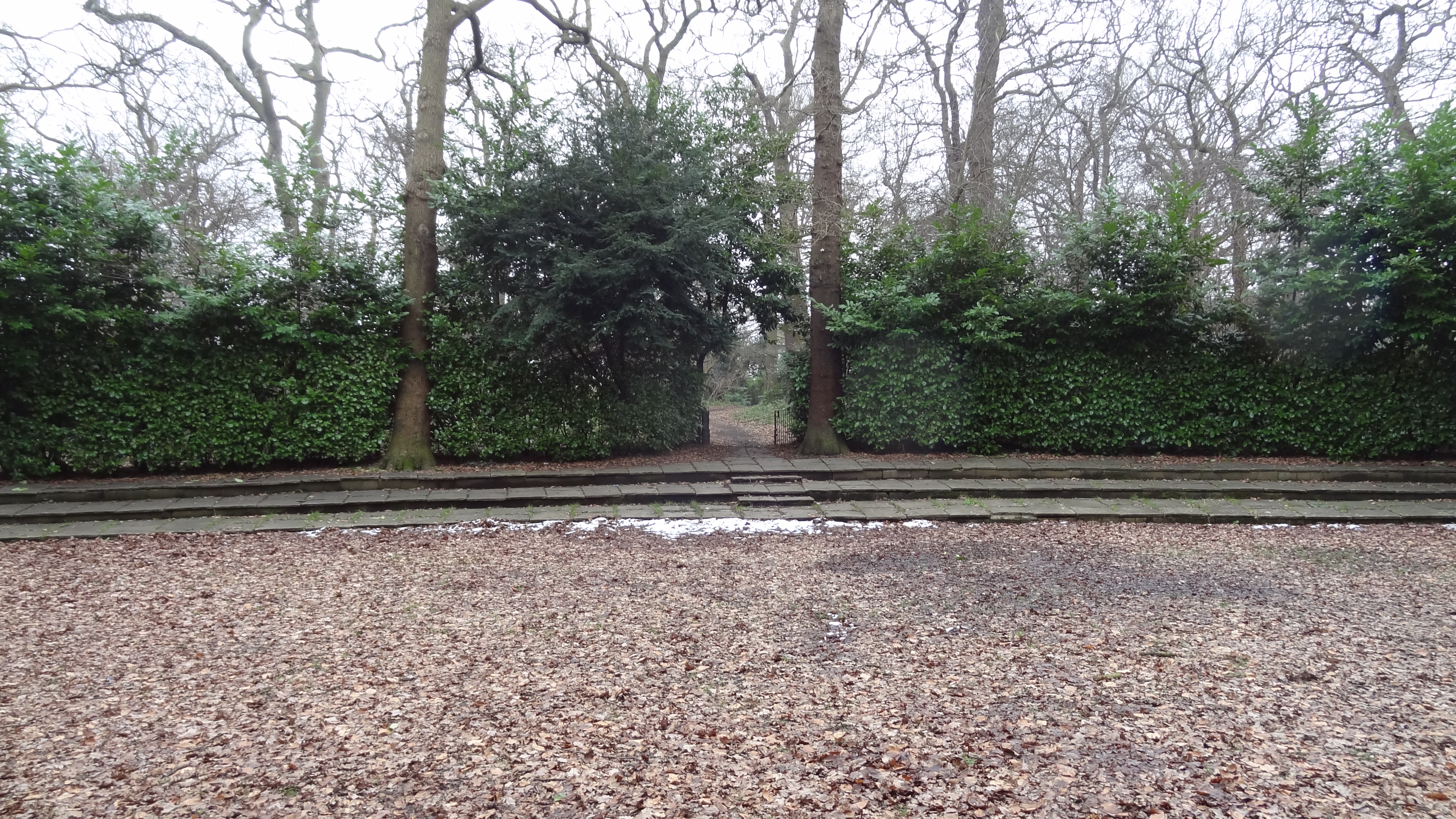
Little Wood theatre

Big Wood and Little Wood are two patches of woodland in Hampstead Garden Suburb in the London Borough of Barnet. They are a Site of Borough Importance for Nature Conservation, Grade 1, and a Local Nature Reserve. Big Wood is 7.3 hectares and Little Wood is 1.2 hectares.

The woods have been a forest for over 1000 years, and were probably part of land given to Wealdheri, Bishop of London in about 704. The area remained in church ownership until the twentieth century, and in 1911 the woods were part of lands leased to the Hampstead Garden Suburb Trust by the Ecclesiastical Commissioners. In 1933 the freehold of the woods was transferred to Finchley Urban District Council, and in 1965 the land passed to its successor, the London Borough of Barnet. Prior to the construction of the Denman Drive North and South in 1912 on the field between Little and Big Woods, the land was used for grazing elephants.

Pedunculate oak is the main canopy tree, together with sessile oak, hornbeam and wild cherry. It also contains an unusually large population of wild service trees, while the undergrowth is dominated by bramble and ivy, with many bluebells. Breeding birds include tawny owl, nuthatch and treecreeper.

At the Temple fortune Hill entrance to Big Wood there is a new gate donated by local people as a memorial to 29 Garden Suburb residents who died in World War II. It stands on an ancient eighth century boundary. Little Wood has an open-air theatre built in 1920.

There is access to Big Wood from Northway, Temple Fortune Hill, Oakwood Road and Denman Drive South, and to Little Wood from Denman Drive North and Addison Way.

== See also ==
- Nature reserves in Barnet
- Barnet parks and open spaces
