= St Mary's Church, Wavertree =

Coordinates: 53.4007°N 2.9199°W

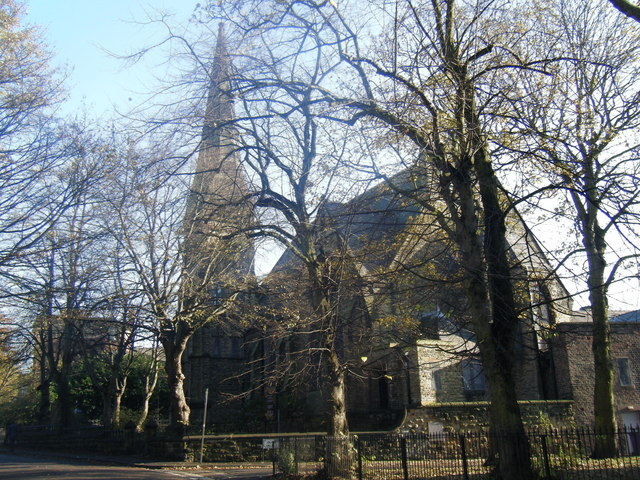
- St Mary's Church, Wavertree, from the southeast

- Location in Merseyside
- OS grid reference: SJ 389 897
- Location: North Drive, Wavertree, Liverpool, Merseyside
- Country: England
- Denomination: Anglican
- Website: St Mary, Wavertree

History
- Status: Parish church

Architecture
- Functional status: Active
- Heritage designation: Grade II
- Designated: 14 March 1975
- Architectural type: Church
- Groundbreaking: 1872
- Completed: 1880s

Specifications
- Materials: Sandstone, slate roofs

Administration
- Province: York
- Diocese: Liverpool
- Archdeaconry: Liverpool
- Deanery: Toxteth and Wavertree
- Parish: St Mary, Wavertree

Clergy
- Rector: Revd June Asquith

St Mary's Church is in North Drive, Wavertree, Liverpool, Merseyside, England. It is an active Anglican parish church in the deanery of Toxteth and Wavertree, the archdeaconry of Liverpool, and the diocese of Liverpool. The church is recorded in the National Heritage List for England as a designated Grade II listed building.

== History ==
The building originated as a Methodist church, which was built in 1872–73. In the 1880s additions were made to it, including a tower with a broach spire. The church was damaged during the First World War, and was renovated in 1925. It failed to flourish, and closed as a Methodist church in 1950.

St Mary's Anglican church was designed by W. and J. Hay and built in Sandown Park. The foundation stone was laid on 15 August 1850, and the church was consecrated in 1856, but it was destroyed by bombing in the Second World War. When the Methodists closed the church, it was sold to the Church of England, and converted for use as an Anglican church. This was consecrated in December 1952.

== Architecture ==
The church is constructed in yellow sandstone with red sandstone dressings. It has a slated roof. The plan consists of a five-bay nave without aisles, shallow transeptal projections, a canted apse at the east end, a west baptistry, and a northeast steeple. The tower has angle buttresses, and an entrance under a pointed arch, above which are two lancet windows. Over this are two-light windows with rose windows, and above them are a Lombard frieze, gargoyles, and a pierced parapet. The windows along the sides of the nave have two lights and contain Decorated tracery. At the east end of the church is a blocked entrance, with a five-light window above it. Incorporated in the blocked entrance is the foundation stone of the original Anglican church.

== Associated features ==
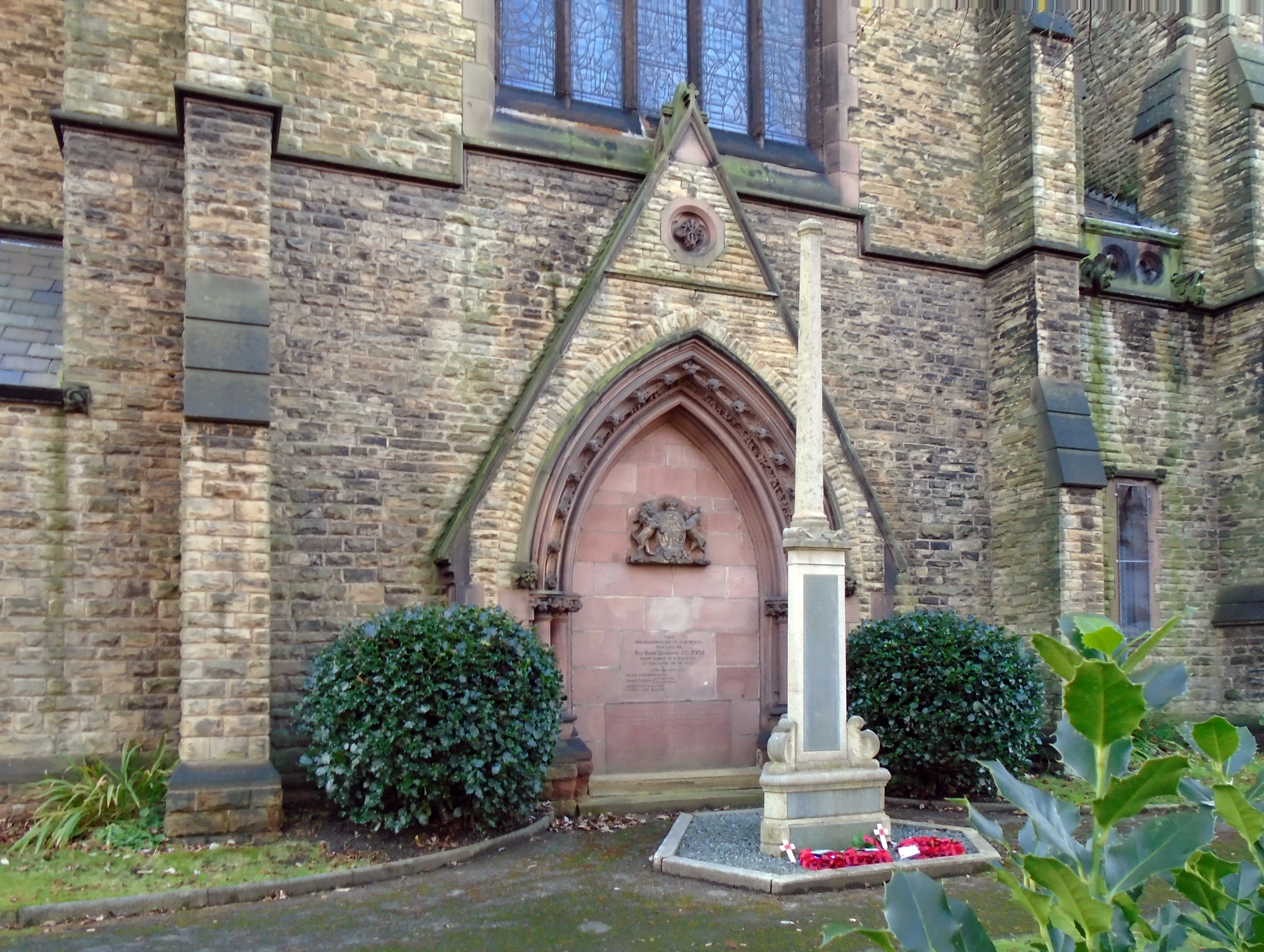
The war memorial

In the churchyard is a war memorial that was moved from the churchyard of the previous church. The memorial is also recorded as a designated Grade II listed building. It is in stone, and has a triangular plinth. On the plinth is a triangular pedestal with scrolled feet on the corners at the base, and a cornice with carved scrolls at the top. Standing on the pedestal is a hexagonal tapering column with a simple hexagonal column at the top. On the east side of the base is a stone plaque commemorating those who died in the Second World War, on each side of the plinth is an inscribed stone plaque, and on the sides of the pedestal are plaques with the names of those who died in the First World War. The memorial stands in a hexagonal area bounded by a kerb and filled with gravel.

== See also ==
- Grade II listed buildings in Liverpool-L15
