= John Soutar =

Scottish-born architect

John Carrick Stuart Soutar (1881 – 27 February 1951) was a Scottish-born architect, and is particularly associated with the design of buildings in Hampstead Garden Suburb in north London.

Soutar's older brother, Archibald Stuart Soutar (1879–1951), was also an architect. Both were admitted LRIBA on 20 March 1911, proposed by William Edward Riley, Arthur Alfred Carder and James Maxwell Scott, of the London County Council architects department. John Soutar had joined the department in 1901 following an apprenticeship with Thomas Martin Cappon.

The Soutar brothers started in independent practice after winning a competition for the layout of Ruislip Manor Estate (on land owned by King's College, Cambridge). This competition was assessed by Raymond Unwin, who subsequently commissioned them to work on Hampstead Garden Suburb in 1913–14. In December 1914, after Unwin was appointed to the Local Government Board, George Lister Sutcliffe took over as consultant architect for the Suburb, but became seriously ill the following year before dying in September 1915. John Soutar then became sole architect to the Hampstead Garden Suburb Trust, maintaining an office at Wyldes, and designing over 100 houses and other buildings, including parts of the institute (today part of Henrietta Barnett School). His contribution to the Suburb was applauded by architectural critic and author Christopher Hussey in Country Life magazine:

"Architecturally, the result [the Suburb] is an outstanding success. For this much of the credit is due to Mr John C S Soutar. ... It is due to him that the original plan and standard of design have been so consistently maintained, in spite of so many difficulties. Besides designing a large number of buildings himself, Mr Soutar has been responsible for the supervision – in many cases the considerable alteration – of all the designs submitted."

The Soutars were also architects for the Knebworth Garden Village development, and designed mainly in a late Stuart idiom, influenced by Riley and Sir Edwin Lutyens, who continued to work at Hampstead.

John Soutar died on 27 February 1951 at Fairport, Hampstead Garden Suburb.
