= Wavertree Lock-up =

Coordinates: 53.3983°N 2.9144°W

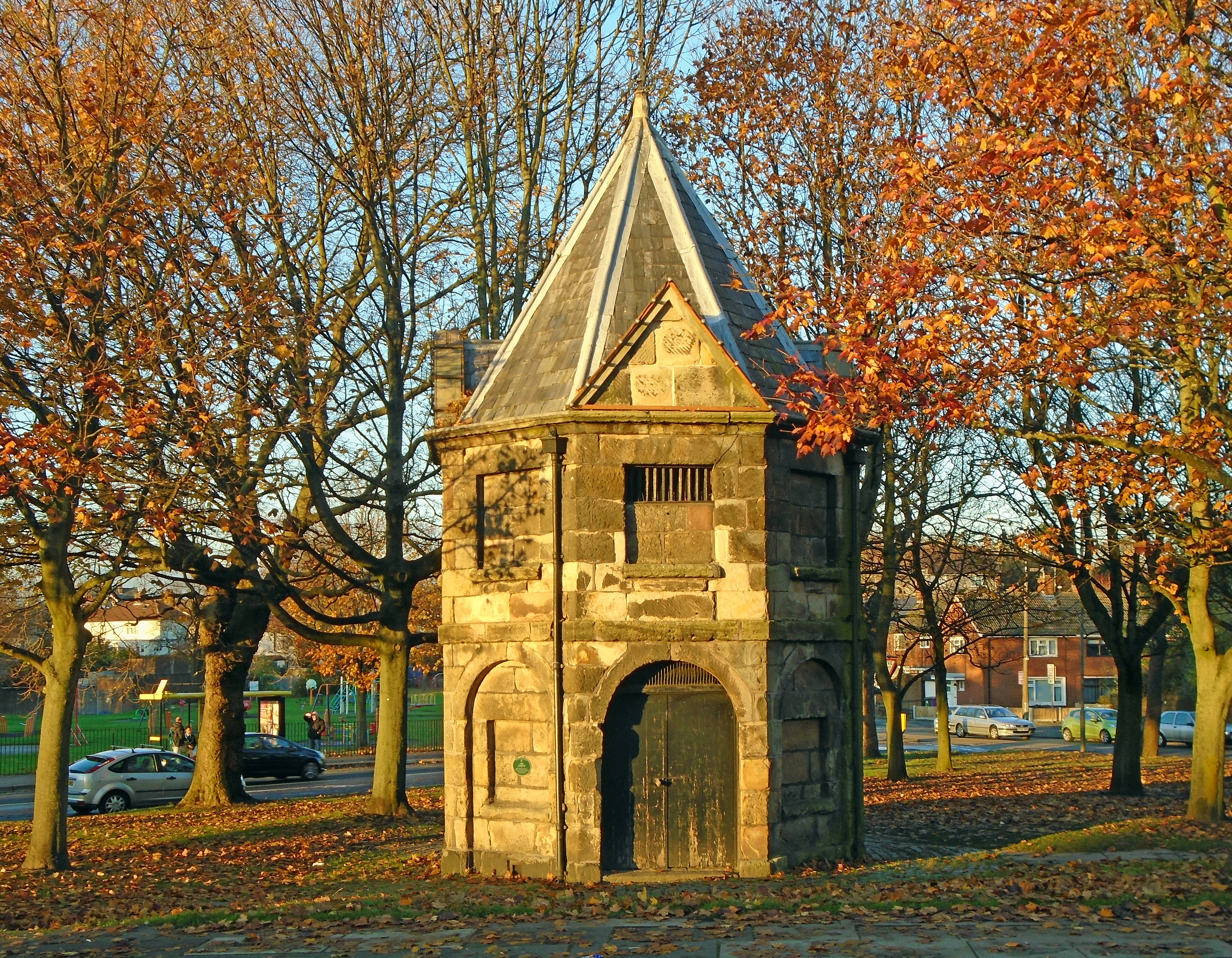
- Interactive map of Wavertree Lock-up
- Location: Wavertree, Liverpool

History
- Built: 1796

Site notes
- Restored: 1869
- Restored by: James Picton

Listed Building – Grade II
- Designated: 28 June 1952
- Reference no.: 1068320

Wavertree Lock-up is an 18th-century grade II listed village lock-up located in Wavertree, Liverpool, England.

== History ==
Funded by local residents, the lock-up was constructed in 1796 as a drunk tank to hold intoxicated persons overnight. Prior to its construction a local unpaid constable was charged with looking after drunks in their own home all the while claiming an expense of 2 shillings. Eventually, it became cheaper for a lock-up to be built rather than house drunks with a constable and therefore the building was constructed. Made from yellow sandstone, the building is octagonal in shape, two storeys high and made of local sandstone.

During the 1840s the lock-up served as an isolation room for cholera victims and later during the Irish famine accommodation for families. In 1869, James Picton replaced the building's original flat roof with a pointed one to prevent prisoners from escaping through the building's roof.

== See also ==
- Grade II listed buildings in Liverpool-L15
