= Wavertree Town Hall =

Municipal building in Wavertree, Merseyside, England

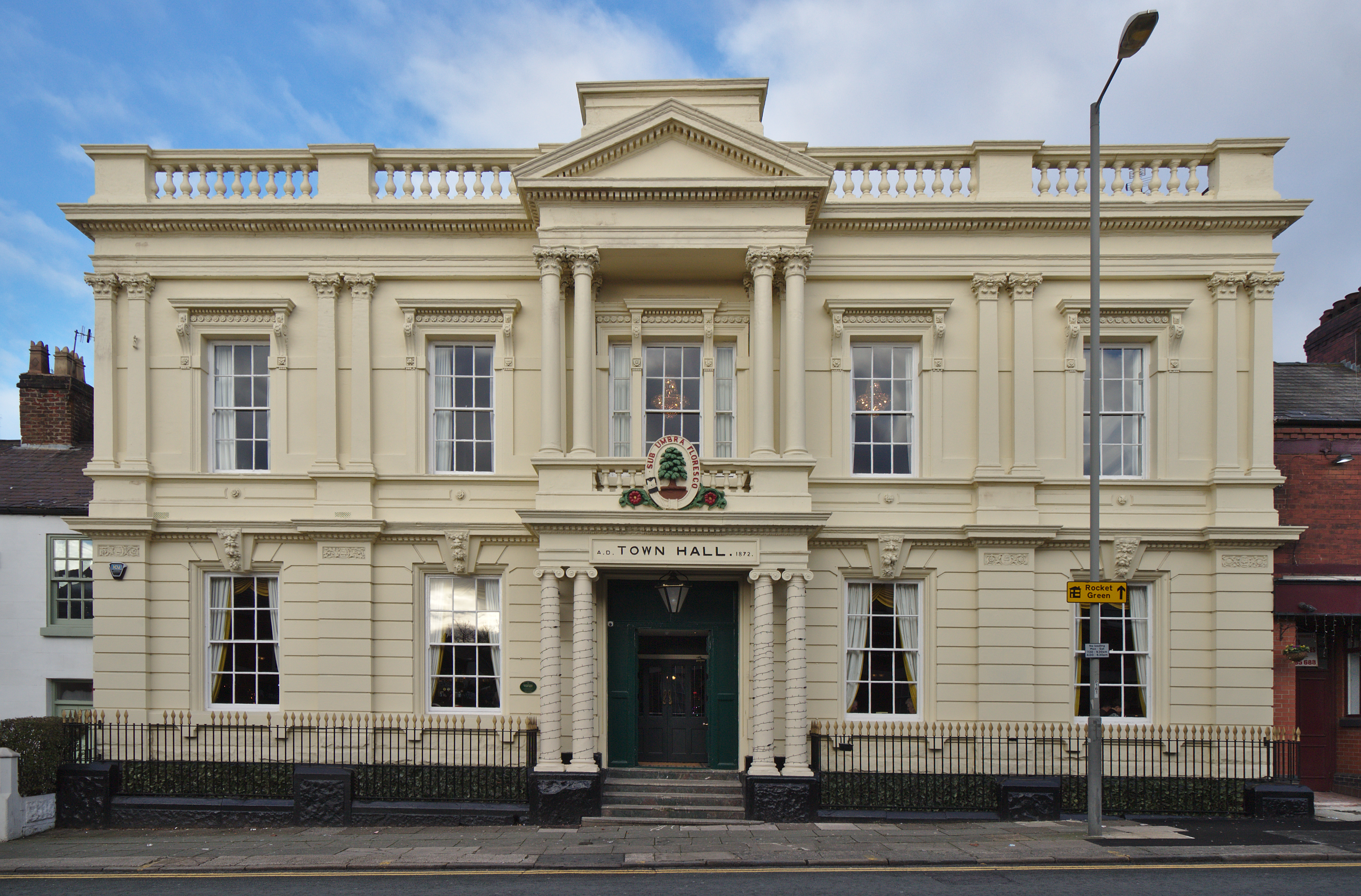
- Wavertree Town Hall

- Shown in Merseyside
- 53.3986°N 2.9176°W
- Location: 89 High Street, Wavertree, Liverpool, England

History
- Built: 1872

Site notes
- Architect: John Elliot Reeve
- Architectural style: Neoclassical style

Listed Building – Grade II
- Official name: Wavertree Town Hall
- Designated: 14 March 1975
- Reference no.: 1075219

Wavertree Town Hall is a municipal building in the High Street, Wavertree, Merseyside, England. The structure, which was once the offices of Wavertree local board of health, is a Grade II listed building.

== History ==
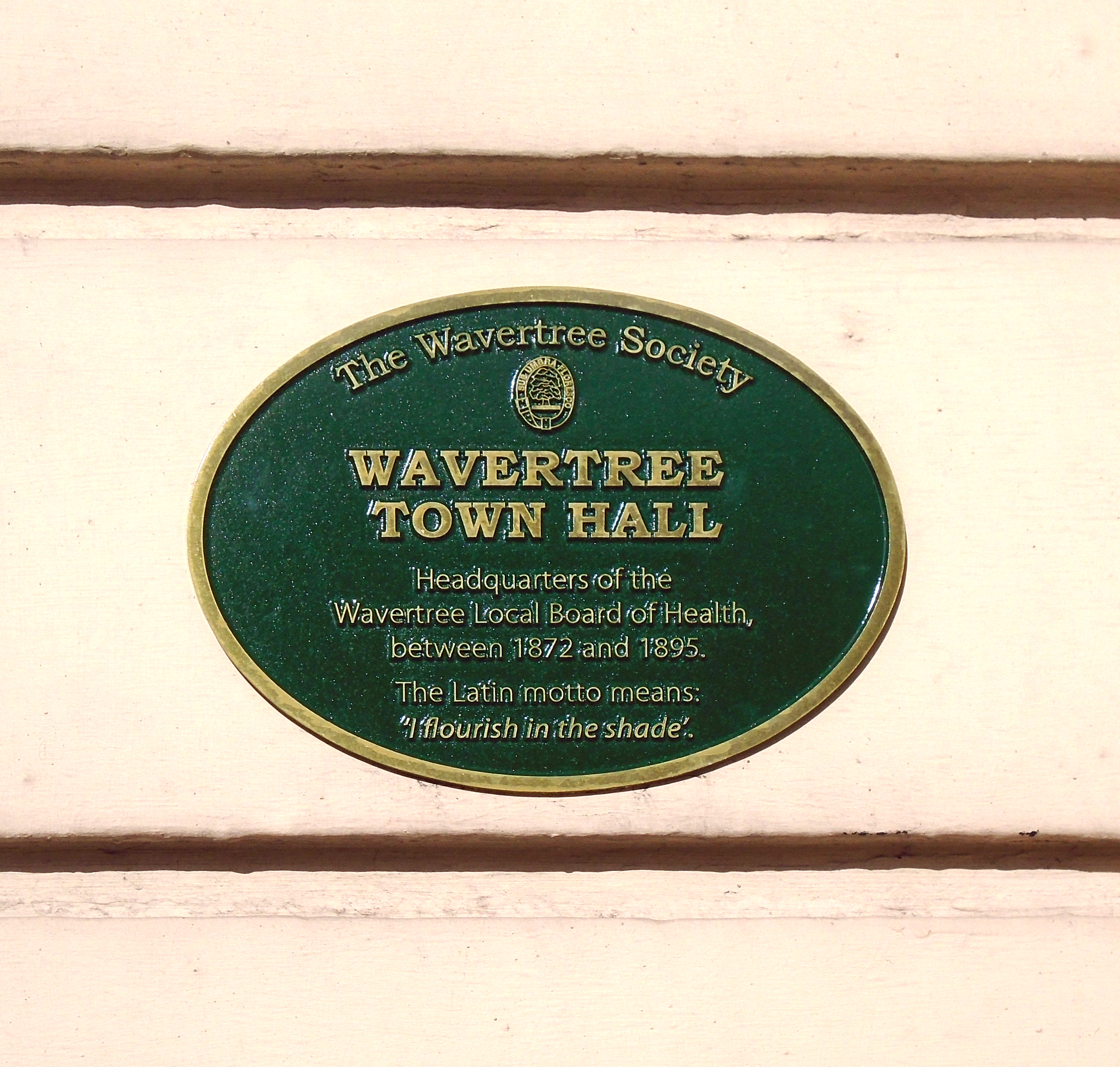
Plaque on the town hall

A local board of health was established to make improvements in Wavertree in June 1851 and, in the late 1860s, the board decided to commission purpose-built offices for the administration of the town.

The building was designed by the local architect, John Elliot Reeve, in the neoclassical style, built in stone with a stucco finish and was completed in 1872. The design involved a symmetrical main frontage with five bays facing onto the High Street; the central bay, which projected forward, featured a porch with Ionic order columns supporting an entablature inscribed with the words "Town Hall" and the date of construction. On the first floor, there was an aedicula formed by a balcony, bearing the town's coat of arms, and pairs of Corinthian order columns supporting a modillioned pediment. The other bays were fenestrated, on the ground floor, by sash windows with keystones bearing carvings of fruit and, on the first floor, by sash windows with consoled cornices. At roof level, there was a balustrade. Internally, the principal rooms were the offices of the local board of health at the front of the building and a large ballroom at the rear of the building.

Following the implementation of the Local Government Act 1894, Wavertree was absorbed into the City of Liverpool, and although the town hall ceased to be the local seat of government, it continued to be the venue for the delivery of local services including rate collection and register office services. The town hall was the venue where the politician, Randolph Churchill, made his first campaign speech in the Wavertree by-election in January 1935: he spoke to an audience of 500 people earning enthusiastic applause but he failed to secure the seat.

People whose births were registered in the town hall included the singer, George Harrison, who was born in Wavertree in February 1943, and, in autumn 1957, John Lennon and Paul McCartney performed at the town hall as The Quarrymen, a rock and roll band which later evolved into The Beatles.

The building fell into disuse in the 1970s and, after its fabric deteriorated, it was threatened with demolition in 1979. It was acquired by a local businessman, Eric Rooke, and converted into a public house. It closed again in the early 21st century, and, after another refurbishment, it re-opened as Murphy's Town Hall Tavern in July 2015.

== See also ==
- Grade II listed buildings in Liverpool-L15
