= Hampstead Garden Suburb =

Suburb of London, England

Coordinates: 51.583°N 0.185°W

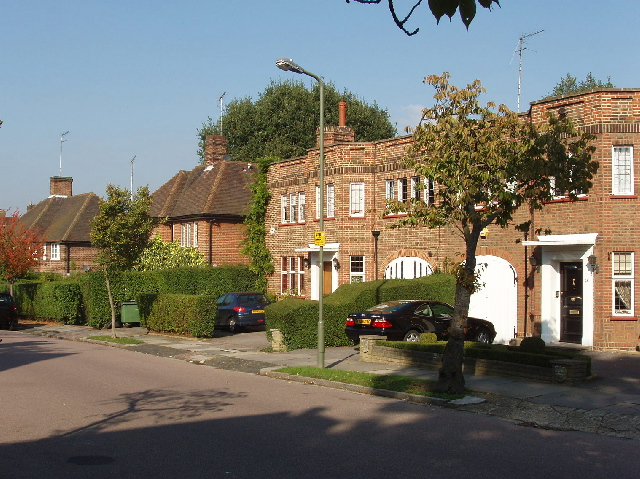
- Litchfield Way

- Location within Greater London
- OS grid reference: TQ265885
- London borough: Barnet
- Ceremonial county: Greater London
- Region: London
- Country: England
- Sovereign state: United Kingdom
- Post town: LONDON
- Postcode district: N2
- Postcode district: NW11
- Dialling code: 020
- Police: Metropolitan
- Fire: London
- Ambulance: London
- UK Parliament: Finchley and Golders Green; Hendon
- London Assembly: Barnet and Camden

Hampstead Garden Suburb is a suburb of London, north of Hampstead, west of Highgate and east of Golders Green. It is known for its intellectual, liberal, artistic, musical and literary associations. It is an example of early twentieth-century domestic architecture and town planning in the London Borough of Barnet, northwest London.

The master plan was prepared by Barry Parker and Sir Raymond Unwin. It consists of just over 5,000 properties and is home to around 16,000 people. Undivided houses with individual gardens are a key feature. The area enjoys landscaped garden squares, several communal parks and Hampstead Heath Extension.

Despite its name being Hampstead Garden Suburb, it is not an actual suburb of Hampstead, nor are the two in the same London borough, since Hampstead is in the London Borough of Camden, and Hampstead Garden Suburb in the London Borough of Barnet.

== History ==
Hampstead Garden Suburb was founded by Henrietta Barnett, who, with her husband Samuel, had started the Whitechapel Art Gallery and Toynbee Hall. In 1906 Barnett set up the Hampstead Garden Suburb Trust Ltd, which purchased 243 acres of land from Eton College for the scheme and appointed Raymond Unwin as its architect.

Among the aims of the scheme were the following:

- It should cater for all classes of people and all income groups.
- There should be a low housing density.
- Roads should be wide and tree-lined.
- Houses should be separated by hedges, not walls.
- Woods and public gardens should be free to all.
- It should be quiet, with no church bells.

This required a private bill before Parliament, since it was counter to local bylaws. The provisions of the new act, Hampstead Garden Suburb Act 1906, allowed less land to be taken up by roads and more by gardens and open spaces.

The ideas for the 'Garden Suburb' were clearly based on the ideas and experience of Parker and Unwin in the planning and development of Letchworth Garden City, the first development of its kind, inspired by the work of Ebenezer Howard. Other consultant architects involved with the Hampstead development include George Lister Sutcliffe and John Soutar.

However, with no industry, no public houses and few shops or services, the suburb, unlike the garden cities, made no attempt to be self-contained. In the 1930s the "Suburb" (as it is known by locals) expanded to north of the A1. Whilst more characterful than most other suburban housing, some of the housing to the north is considered, overall, of less architectural value.

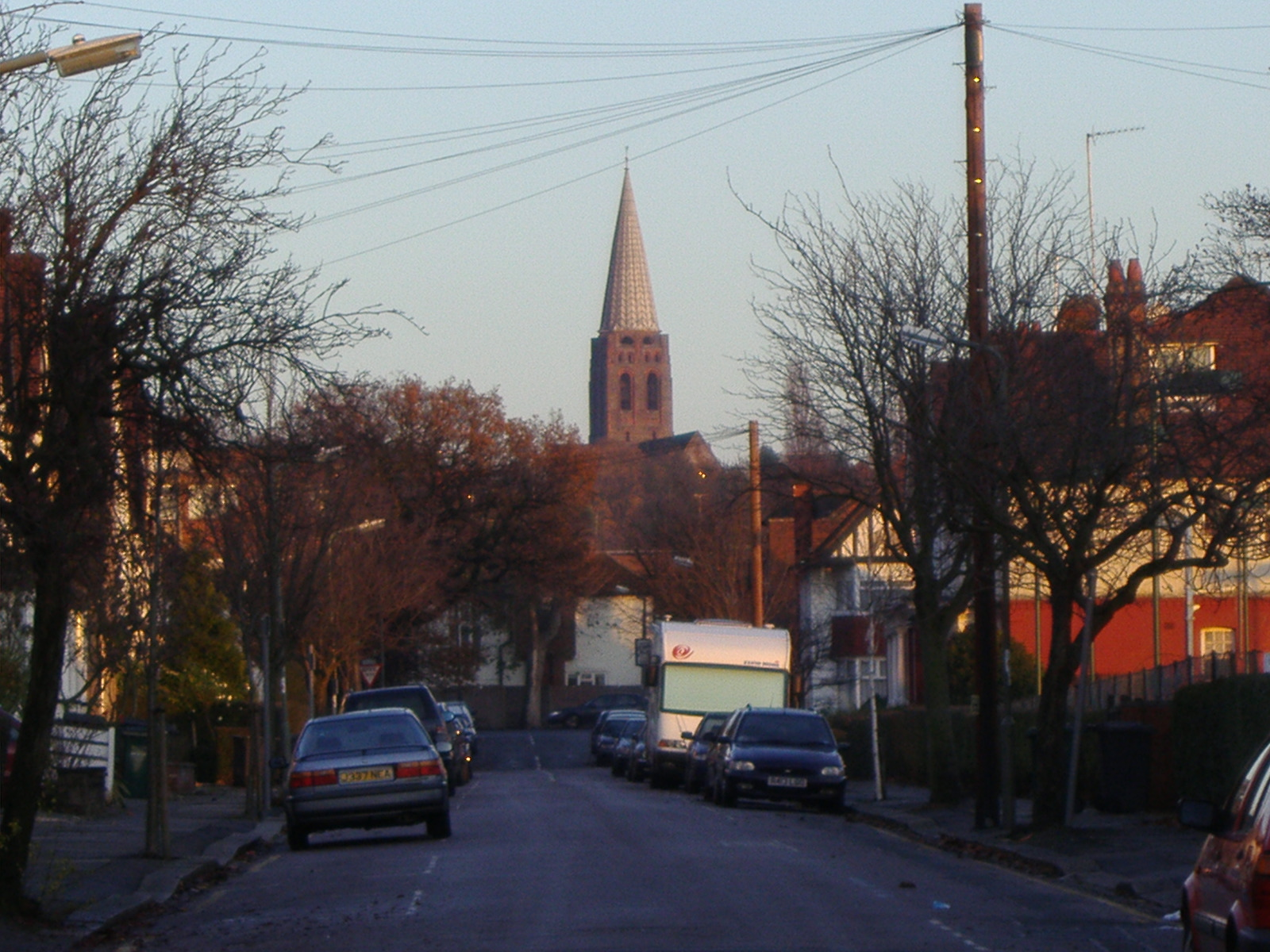
The spire of St Jude's church, as seen from a street in Temple Fortune

On Central Square, laid out by Sir Edwin Lutyens, there are two large churches, St Jude's Church and The Free Church, as well as a Quaker Meeting House. There are two state mixed primary schools in the Suburb, Garden Suburb and Brookland. There is also a girls' state grammar school, Henrietta Barnett School.

The school used to share its premises with The Institute, one of the largest providers of adult education in Barnet, but it moved to East Finchley in 2007. As a result of financial problmes it moved again to Kingsbury in 2014 and closed down in 2016.

Shops and other services are provided in the shopping parade of Market Place. Shopping areas adjacent to the suburb include Temple Fortune, Golders Green and East Finchley.

Little Wood contains an open-air arena, which is used for summer performances by a local amateur theatre society.

In 2015, the residents' association decided to implement a yellow and red card penalty system to discourage neighbours from using noisy lawnmowers and leafblowers.

== Hampstead Garden Suburb Trust ==
Freehold houses, flats and commercial premises within the Suburb are subject to a scheme of management approved pursuant to the Leasehold Reform Act 1967 by an Order of the Chancery Division of the High Court, dated 17 January 1974, as amended by a further Order dated 17 February 1983.

The HGS Trust maintains the character and amenity of the Suburb and is responsible for implementing the management scheme. It has offices in Finchley Road. Freeholders are required to obtain the approval of the trust before altering the external appearance of their properties. Consent is also required for significant changes to gardens, erection of garden sheds and felling or pruning of trees. The trust is also the freeholder of the majority of the remaining leasehold properties in the Suburb, which are mostly held on very long leases.

== Hampstead Garden Suburb Act 1906 ==
Hampstead Garden Suburb Act 1906
- Act of Parliament
- Parliament of the United Kingdom
- Long title: An Act to confer powers upon the Hampstead Garden Suburb Trust Limited for the purpose of enabling that Company to develop and lay out lands as garden suburbs.
- Citation: 6 Edw. 7. c. cxcii

Dates
- Royal assent: 4 August 1906

Urban town planning had been restricted by the bylaws established after the Public Health Act 1875, which had de facto called for a grid-iron street layout and a minimum housing density. This had prevented Cadbury building workers’ houses within a city and caused Rowntree to build his housing in rural parishes. For Unwin to design a street structure that followed the contours and build houses in cul-de-sacs an act of Parliament was needed. The Hampstead Garden Suburb Trust sponsored a private bill, which was passed as the Hampstead Garden Suburb Act 1906 (6 Edw. 7. c. cxcii).

The three relevant sections of the act were

Section 2

There shall not be built in the Garden Suburb on the average throughout a greater proportion of houses to the acre than eight.

On every road in the Garden Suburb (whatever the width of the said road) there shall be between any two houses standing on opposite sides of the road a space not less than fifty feet free of any buildings except walls, fences or gates.

Section 3

With respect to any gardens, recreation grounds or open spaces provided by the Company for the common use of the inhabitants of any dwellings in the Garden Suburb the Company may make bye-laws for the regulation thereof ...

Section 5

Any road not exceeding 500 feet in length constructed primarily for the purpose of giving access to a group of houses in the Garden Suburb and not designed for the purposes of through traffic (known as an accommodation road), may with the consent of the local authority be exempted from any operation of any bye-laws of the local authority relating to the width of new streets and footways.

Section 2, defined a low building density, and wide streets with gardens or verges where trees could be planted. Section 5 distinguished between through-roads and accommodation roads, residential cul-de-sacs under 500 feet (150 m). It recognised the difference between cul-de-sac roads of limited length and other roads, and allowed the suspension of the operation of certain local planning bye-laws

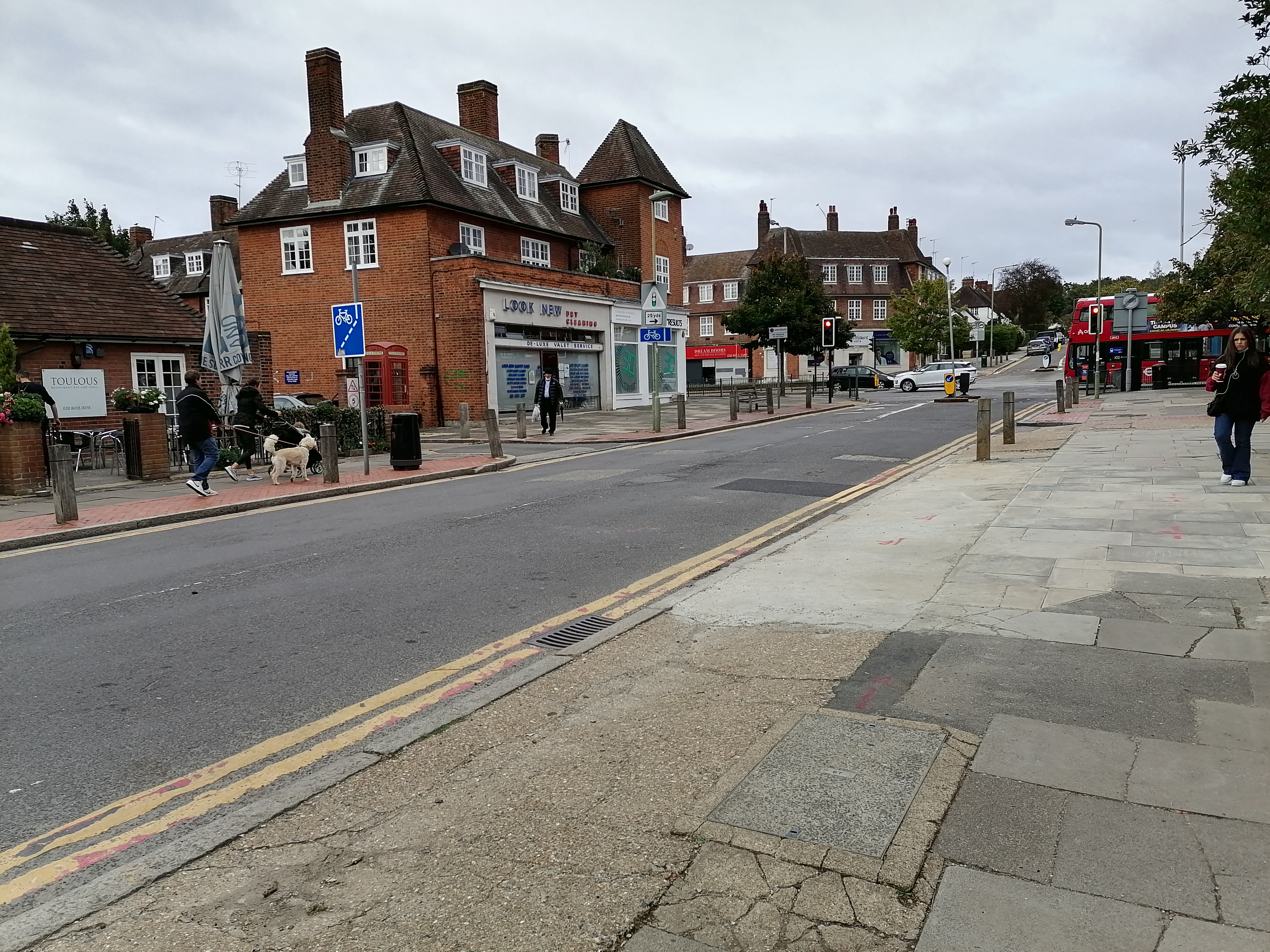
Northway in Hampstead Garden Suburb

== Parks and nature reserves ==
The Suburb has large areas of open space, including Central Square; Hampstead Heath Extension; Northway Gardens; Lyttelton Playing Fields; and Big Wood and Little Wood. The southern end is close to Golders Hill Park.

== Politics ==
Hampstead Garden Suburb is represented by two councillors on Barnet Council who represent the Garden Suburb ward. Hampstead Garden Suburb is in the parliamentary constituency of Finchley and Golders Green. As of 2024, it is represented by Sarah Sackman of the Labour Party.

== Notable residents ==
- Victor Blank, businessman and philanthropist
- Margaret Bondfield, Labour politician and first female cabinet minister
- Constantine II of Greece, last King of Greece
- Robert Donat, actor
- Johnny Franz, record producer
- Jean Henderson, barrister and Liberal Party politician
- Myra Hess, pianist
- Peter Mandelson, Labour politician
- John Mills, businessman and politician
- Frank Pick, often known as the 'father' of the modern London Underground
- Donald Sinden, actor
- Harold Wilson, politician who became Prime Minister of the United Kingdom, prior to moving into Downing Street
