= George Lister Sutcliffe =

- Born: 29 September 1864; Heptonstall, Yorkshire, England
- Died: 12 September 1915 (aged 50); Middlesex, England
- Other names: G. L. Sutcliffe
- Known for: Architect

George Lister Sutcliffe (29 September 1864 – 12 September 1915) was an English Arts and Crafts architect and author of a number of technical and architectural publications.

Sutcliffe was a Yorkshireman. He was hired in 1910 by the Ealing Tenants Ltd as chief designer and planner, replacing his younger predecessor Frederic Cavendish Pearson, in order to centralise planning and design and reduce costs. Beginning in 1911, his designs at Brentham Garden Suburb reduced the amount of ornamentation on new designs in the suburb, and instead focused on street symmetry and ultimately a greater "street picture." He remained in the position until his early death in 1915 from heart disease.

In December 1914, he had succeeded Raymond Unwin as consultant architect for Hampstead Garden Suburb; on his death, this role passed to John Soutar.

Sutcliffe designed the Brentham houses "on lower Brentham Way, Fowlers Walk, Holyoake Walk, North View and Denison Road, and some of the houses in Meadvale and Brunswick Roads and in Winscombe Crescent."

== Works ==
- Brentham Institute (1910, now Grade II listed), Meadvale Road, Brentham, Ealing, London W4.
- Holyoake House, "a block of 24 flats for elderly and single people, built around three sides of a quadrangle."

== Publications ==
- "The Principles and Practice of Modern House Construction"
- "The Modern Plumber And Sanitary Engineer": Treating of Plumbing, Sanitary Work, Ventilation, Heating (Electric and Other), Hot-Water Services, Gas-Fitting, Electric Lighting, Bell- Work, Glazing, etc. Gresham, London. (Editor)
