= Picton Clock Tower =

Coordinates: 53.3982°N 2.9158°W

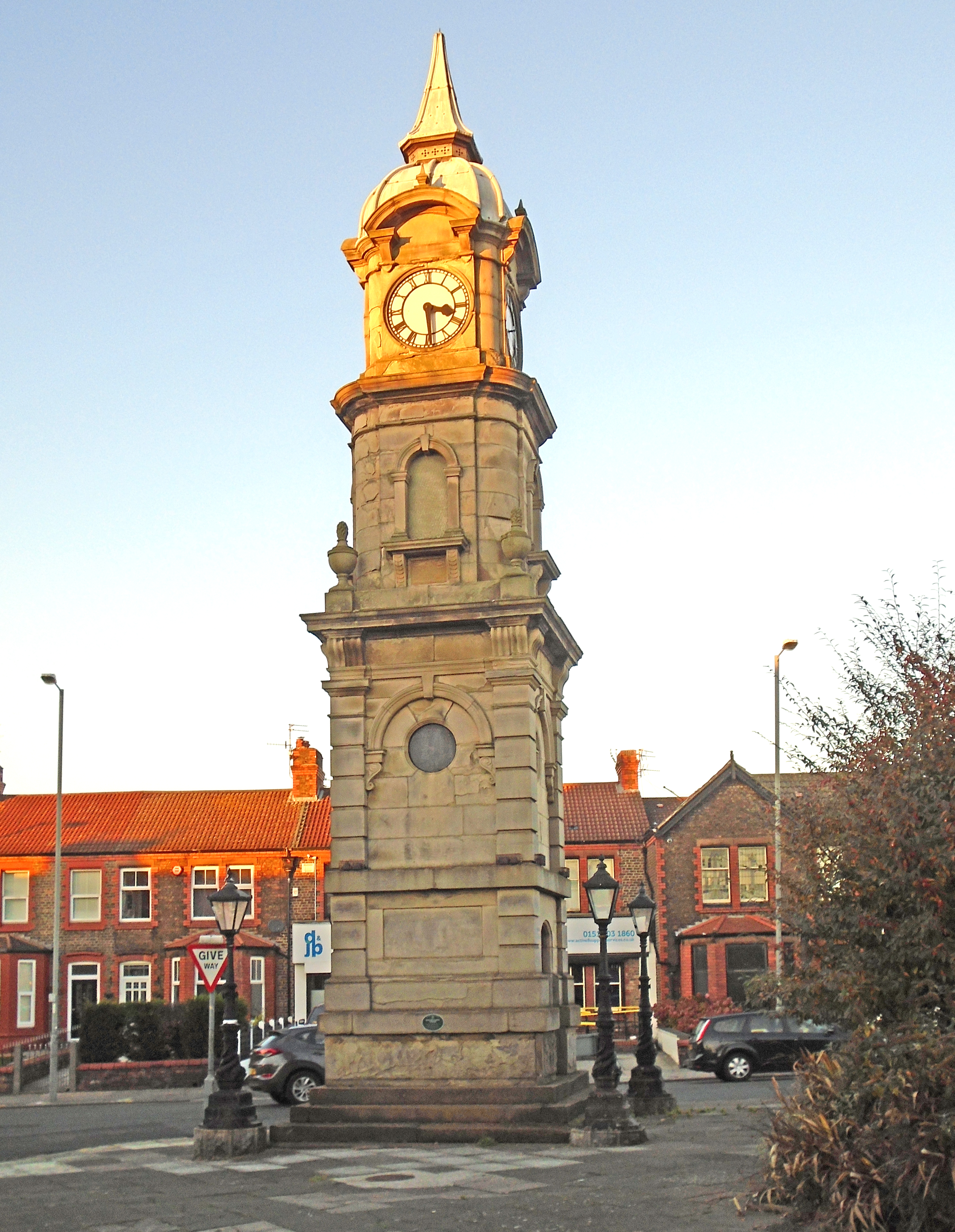
- Picton Clock Tower in 2016
- Location: Wavertree, Liverpool
- Built: 1884

Listed Building – Grade II
- Designated: 14 March 1975
- Reference no.: 1206131

Picton Clock Tower is a 19th-century Grade II listed clock tower located in Wavertree, Liverpool, England. Built in 1884 and designed by James Picton, the tower is a memorial to the architect's wife Sarah Pooley, who had died in 1879.

== Architecture ==
Renaissance in its style, the tower consists of three sections mounted upon a rusticated base and surrounded on four sides by iron street lamps which feature dolphins at their base. On the lower section walls, there are three stone plaques on each side and an access door to the tower, above these are roundels with urns at each corners. Above these are round-headed windows which are topped with a clock face in each direction. At the very top of the tower is a spire with lead cupola.

== Plaques ==
The tower has plaques on three of its sides with two being poems and one a dedication to James Picton's wife Sarah Pooley.

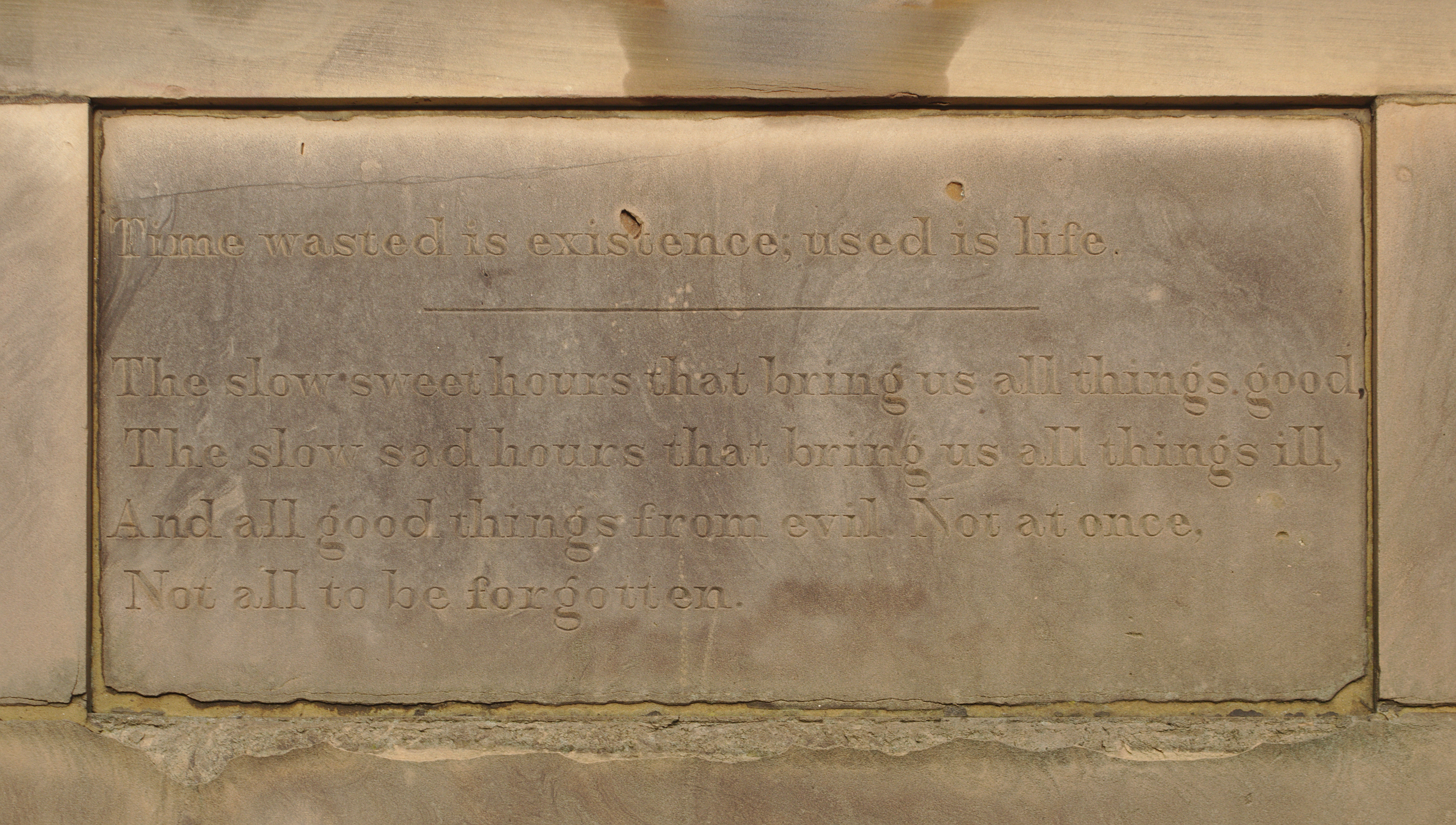
The South facing plaque reads "Time wasted is existence; used is life. The slow sweet hours that bring us all things good, the slow sad hours that bring us all things ill, And all good things from evil. Not at once. Not all to be forgotten."

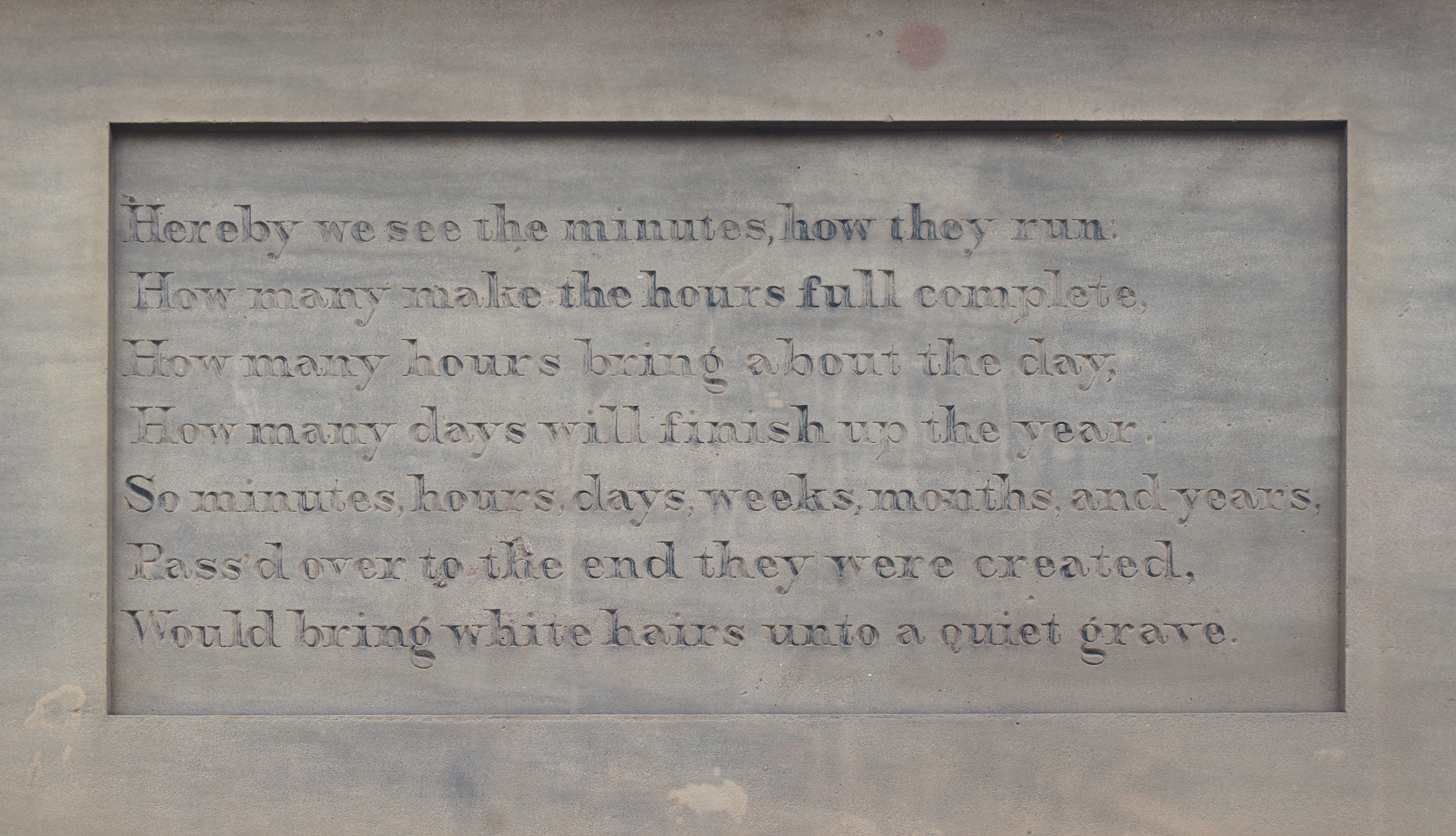
The North side reads "Hereby we see the minutes, how they run; How many make the hours full complete; How many hours bring about the day; How many days will finish up the year. So minutes, hours, days, weeks, months and years; Pass'd over to the end they were created; Would bring white hairs unto a quiet grave."

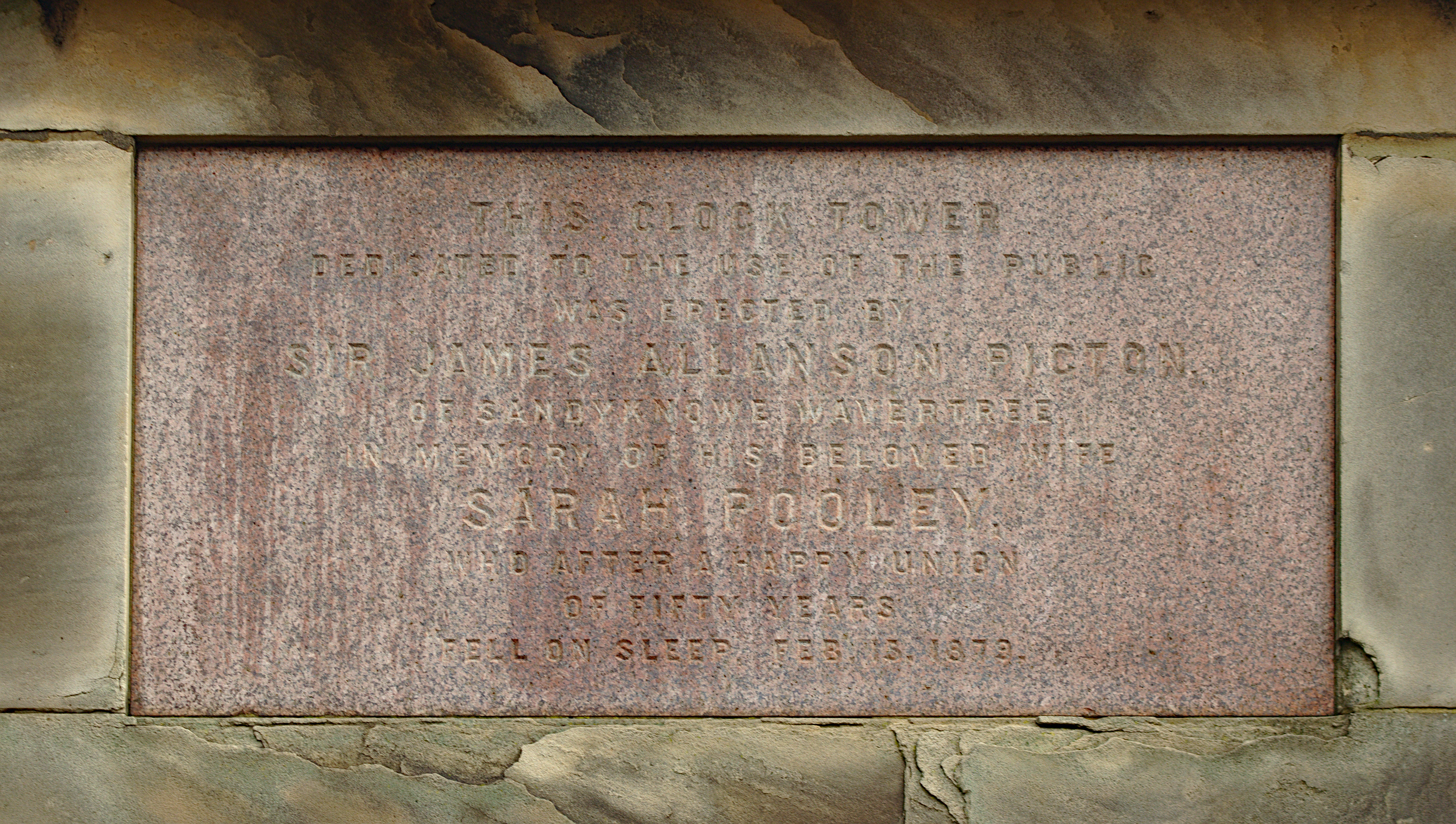
The West facing plaque reads "This clock tower dedicated to the use of the public was erected by Sir James Allanson Picton of Sandy Knowe Wavertree in memory of his beloved wife Sarah Pooley who after a happy union of fifty years fell on sleep Feb 15 1879"

== See also ==
- Grade II listed buildings in Liverpool-L15
