= Terry Scales (painter) =

English artist

- Born: 1932 (age 93–94); Rotherhithe, South London
- Education: Camberwell School of Art
- Occupations: Painter, writer

Terry Scales (born 1932 in Rotherhithe, South London), is a painter and writer. The River Thames and the Port of London are major influences upon his work.

== Biography ==
Terry Scales grew up in the Port of London. His work focuses on growing up in the port and the changes the area has experienced. In 1946, Scales entered the Camberwell School of Art.

== Works ==
Scales is the author of two books:

1. Vision of Greenwich Reach. A Homage to the Working Thames and a revealing insight into 20 of Scales' major river paintings with extracts from his Thames Diaries.
2. Bermondsey Boys. Published in 1999, it includes colorful stories of love and trouble growing up in the "pre-fab generation."
