= Monk's Well =

Holy well in Liverpool, England

Coordinates: 53.3997°N 2.9147°W

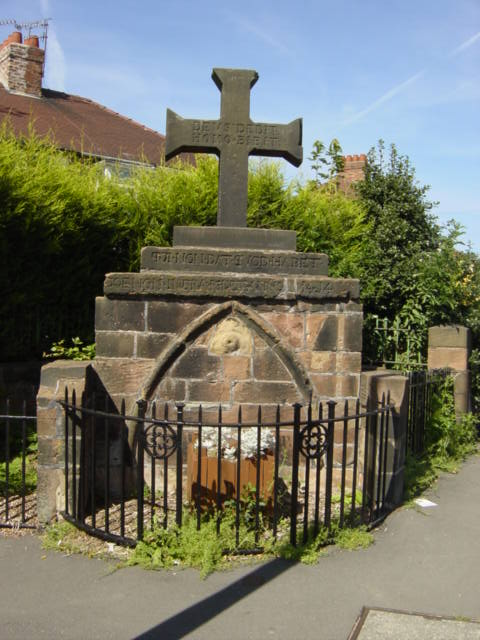
Monk's Well

Monk's Well is a Grade II listed holy well located on Mill Lane, in Wavertree, Liverpool. Constructed during the early 15th century, the well was used by travelers and supported a nearby monastery through alms.

== History ==
According to the well's inscription, it was built in 1414 as a local water source for nearby travelers and monks from the nearby monastery known as Monkswell House. Built from sandstone, the well originally had steps leading down to the spring and was topped with a holy cross. This cross when described in 1893 was seen to be lost; however, a replacement cross was eventually added during the 20th century based on a description of the original.

The well's lower section is inscribed with Latin text which reads "Qui non dat quod habet, dæmon infra ridet: 1414". In English this roughly translates as: "He who here does nought bestow, The Devil laughs at him below", implying that visitors to the well are expected to pay alms. The restored cross also displays the Latin text "Deus dedit, homo bibit", which translates to "God gives, man drinks".

To improve accessibility, an iron pump was added in 1835 to pump water from the spring below, removing the need for travellers to descend into the chamber. Over time, the well fell into disuse due to the advent of home piping and the demolition of the nearby monastery. However, the well's historical significance was recognised, and it became a Grade II listed structure in 1952. Today the well is non-functioning, and has been converted into a flower bed.
