= Tom's Midnight Garden =

1958 novel by Philippa Pearce

- Classic Einzig cover thought to be first edition
- Author: Philippa Pearce
- Illustrator: Susan Einzig
- Cover artist: Susan Einzig
- Language: English
- Genre: Children's fantasy, adventure novel
- Publisher: Oxford University Press
- Publication date: 31 December 1958
- Publication place: United Kingdom
- Media type: Print (hardback & paperback)
- Pages: 229 pp (first edition)
- ISBN: 0-19-271128-8
- OCLC: 13537516
- LC Class: PZ7.P3145 To2

Tom's Midnight Garden is a children's fantasy novel by English author Philippa Pearce. It was first published in 1958 by Oxford University Press with illustrations by Susan Einzig. The story is about a twelve-year-old boy, Tom, who, while staying with his aunt and uncle, slips out at midnight and discovers a magical, mysterious Victorian garden where he befriends a young girl named Hatty. The novel has been reissued in print many times and also adapted for radio, television, cinema, and the stage.

Pearce won the annual Carnegie Medal from the Library Association, recognising the year's outstanding children's book by a British author. In 2007, for a celebration of the Carnegie Medal's 70th anniversary, a panel named Tom's Midnight Garden one of the top ten Medal-winning works and the British public elected it the nation's second-favourite.

== Premise ==
Tom is a modern boy living under quarantine with his aunt and uncle in a city flat, part of a converted building that was a country house during the 1880s–1890s. At night he slips back in time to the old garden where he finds a girl playmate, named Hatty. Hatty is a princess, or so she says.

== Plot summary ==
When Tom Long's brother Peter gets measles, Tom is sent to stay with his Uncle Alan and Aunt Gwen. They live in an upstairs flat of a big house with no garden, only a tiny yard for parking. The former grounds of the big house have been sold for building and are occupied by modern houses. The elderly and reclusive landlady, Mrs Bartholomew, lives above them. Because Tom may be infectious, he is not allowed out to play, and he feels lonely. Without exercise he lies awake after midnight, restless, when he hears the communal grandfather clock strangely strike 13. He gets up to investigate and discovers that the back door now opens on a large sunlit garden. However, when Tom checks the back door the following morning, the garden is no longer there.

Every night the clock strikes 13 and Tom returns to the Victorian era grounds. There he meets another lonely child, a girl named Hatty, and they become inseparable playmates. Tom sees the family occasionally, but only Hatty (and as is revealed later in the book, the gardener) sees him and the others believe she plays alone. Hatty is established to be an orphan sent to live with her aunt and three older male cousins after the death of her parents.

Tom writes daily accounts to his brother Peter, who follows the adventures during his recovery – and afterward, for Tom contrives to extend the stay with Aunt and Uncle. Gradually at first, Hatty grows up and passes Tom's age; he comes to realise that he is slipping to different points in the past. Finally she grows up at a faster rate, until she is an adult and is being courted by an acquaintance of hers who is nicknamed "Barty." At this stage in the book, the season in the old garden tends to be winter. Tom ingeniously obtains ice skates by having Hatty conceal her old pair in his room, where he subsequently finds them and joins her skating on the next night.

On the final night before Tom is due to go home, he goes downstairs to find the garden is not there. He frantically tries to find it, but crashes into a set of bins from the present–day courtyard, waking up several residents. He shouts Hatty's name in desperation, before his Uncle Alan finds him and puts the events down to Tom sleepwalking. The following morning, Mrs Bartholomew summons Tom to apologise, only to reveal herself as Hatty, having made the link when she heard him call her name. The events Tom experienced were real in Hatty's past; he had stepped into them by going into the garden at the times she dreamed of them. On the final night, she had instead been dreaming of her wedding with Barty.

After taking Tom home, Aunt Gwen comments on the strange way that Tom had said goodbye to Mrs Bartholomew when he left: he hugged her as if she were a little girl.

== Themes and literary significance ==
The book is regarded as a classic. The final reunion between Tom, still a child, and the elderly Hatty is, many have argued, one of the most moving moments in children's fiction.

Margery Fisher wrote in 1961 that "as a child's story it is magnificent. It is at once philosophical, swift and gay. The conversations of Hatty and Tom are natural, the incidents probable and presented with beautiful clarity. The style is impeccable—loose jointed and flexible, colloquial when the occasion demands, at other times rhythmical and poetic."

In Written for Children (1965), John Rowe Townsend summarised, "If I were asked to name a single masterpiece of English children's literature since [the Second World War] ... it would be this outstandingly beautiful and absorbing book". He retained that judgment in the second edition of that magnum opus (1983) and in 2011 repeated it, in a retrospective review of the novel.

In the first chapter of Narratives of Love and Loss: Studies in Modern Children's Fiction, Margaret and Michael Rustin analyse the emotional resonances of Tom's Midnight Garden and describe its use of imagination and metaphor, also comparing it to The Secret Garden by Frances Hodgson Burnett.

Researcher Ward Bradley, in his review of various modern stories and books depicting Victorian British society, criticized Midnight Garden for "romanticizing the world of the 19th-century aristocratic mansions, making it a glittering 'lost paradise' contrasted with the drab reality of contemporary lower middle class Britain.(...) A child deriving an image of Victorian England from this engaging and well-written fairy tale would get no idea of the crushing poverty in the factories and slums from where mansion owners often derived their wealth".

Time slip would be a popular device in British children's novels in this period, as featured in successful works include Alison Uttley's A Traveller in Time (1939, slipping back to the period of Mary, Queen of Scots), Ronald Welch's The Gauntlet (1951, slipping back to the Welsh Marches in the fourteenth century), Clive King's Stig of the Dump (1963, with a final chapter slipping back to the making of Stonehenge), Barbara Sleigh's Jessamy (1967, back to the First World War), and Charlotte Sometimes by Penelope Farmer (1969, back to 1918).

== Allusions ==
The historical part of the book is set in the grounds of a mansion, which resembles the house in which the author grew up: the Mill House in Great Shelford, near Cambridge, England. Cambridge is represented in fictional form as Castleford throughout the book. At the time she was writing the book, the author was again living in Great Shelford, just across the road from the Mill House. The Kitsons' (in past, the Melbournes') house is thought to be based on a house in Cambridge, near where Pearce studied during her time at university. The theory of time of which the novel makes use is that of J. W. Dunne's influential 1927 work An Experiment with Time.

== Film, TV or theatrical adaptations ==
- Dramatised by the BBC three times, in 1968, 1974, and 1988 (which aired in 1989).
- 1999 full-length movie starring Anthony Way
- Adapted for the stage by David Wood in 2001.

== Publication history ==
- 1958, UK, Oxford University Press (ISBN 0-19-271128-8), Publication date: 31 December 1958, hardcover (first edition)
- 1992, UK, HarperCollins (ISBN 0-397-30477-3), Publication date: 1 February 1992, hardcover
- 2001, Adapted for the stage by David Wood, Samuel French (ISBN 0-573-05127-5)

== 2007 recognition ==
Since 1936, the professional association of British librarians has recognised the year's best new book for children with the Carnegie Medal. Philippa Pearce and Tom won the 1958 Medal. For the 70th anniversary celebration in 2007, a panel of experts appointed by the children's librarians named Tom's Midnight Garden one of the top ten Medal-winning works, which composed the ballot for a public election of the nation's favourite. It finished second in the public vote from that shortlist, between two books that were about forty years younger. Among votes cast from the UK, Northern Lights polled 40%, Tom's Midnight Garden 16%; Skellig 8%. The winning author, Philip Pullman, graciously said: "Personally I feel they got the initials right but not the name. I don't know if the result would be the same in a hundred years' time; maybe Philippa Pearce would win then." Julia Eccleshare, Children's Books Editor for The Guardian, continued the theme: "Northern Lights is the right book by the right author. Philip is accurate in saying that the only contention was from the other PP. And, it must be said, Tom's Midnight Garden has lasted almost 60 years ... and we don't know that Northern Lights will do the same. But, yes. A very good winner."

== See also ==
Awards
Preceded by A Grass Rope	Carnegie Medal recipient 1958	Succeeded by The Lantern Bearers
