= Muspratt =

Muspratt is a surname. Notable people with the surname include: Members of one family:

- James Muspratt, a chemical industrialist whose four sons who also worked in the chemical industry:
- James Sheridan Muspratt, who moved into academic chemistry
- Richard Muspratt, who was also a local politician in Flint, North Wales
- Frederic Muspratt
- Edmund Knowles Muspratt, also an MP and a local politician
- Max Muspratt, son of Edmund Knowles Muspratt
- Muspratt Baronets

Other people with the same surname include:

- Helen Muspratt, photographer (Ramsey and Muspratt, Cambridge)
- Keith Muspratt, pilot in 56 Squadron in World War I
- General Sir Sydney Muspratt, Military Secretary to the India Office
- Shane Muspratt, North Queensland Cowboys rugby league player
- E. J. Muspratt, architect based in Chester
- Lesley Margaret Muspratt married A. D. H. Bivar
- Julian Muspratt, member of the Australian Olympic water polo team
- John Petty Muspratt, British East India Company director
- William Muspratt, one of the mutineers aboard HMS Bounty
- Paul Muspratt, offshore banker
