= Nelia Penman =

Penman in 1947

Nelia Penman (née Muspratt; 6 November 1915 – 16 August 2017) was a British Liberal Party politician and barrister.

== Background ==
She was born Nelia Muspratt, a daughter of Clifford Muspratt and Bertha Noble. in Hampstead, London. She was part of an established Liverpool Liberal family; she was the niece of the MP Max Muspratt and the suffragists Nessie Stewart-Brown and Julia Solly and granddaughter of the industrialist Edmund Knowles Muspratt. She was educated privately.

On 29 May 1947 she married Derek Penman. They had three daughters, Fiona, Alison and Wendy. The marriage was dissolved in 1974.

== Career ==
She trained as a fencing instructor. She joined the Ministry of Information during the war and also served as a station officer with the London Ambulance Service. In 1945 she became a barrister, being Called to the Bar by Gray's Inn.

== Political career ==
While in her early twenties her activity in the Liberal party took the form of membership of the 8.30 Club, a young Liberal group that monthly debated international issues from its founding in 1936 to 1939. In 1936 she advocated the creation of an International Police Force under the control of the League of Nations. In 1937 she advocated the suppression of Fascist and Communist propaganda. In 1938 she was selected as Liberal prospective parliamentary candidate for Liverpool Wavertree for a general election expected to take place in 1939/40. It was not a promising seat, although the Liberals had won the seat in 1923, they had come fourth at a by-election in 1935. During the war, she continued as PPC for Wavertree and spoke at the 1941 Liberal Assembly in favour of the creation of a Ministry of Civil Defence. She did not contest Wavertree and instead was Liberal candidate for the Sevenoaks Division of Kent at the 1945 general election. Sevenoaks was a safe Conservative seat that the Liberals had not won since 1923. They were second in 1935 when no Labour candidate stood. Labour had no candidate in place in 1939/40. A two-party contest between Conservative and Liberal would have been an attractive prospect for any Liberal in 1945. However Labour intervened and pushed the Liberals into third place;

General election 1945: Sevenoaks
Party	Candidate	Votes	%	±%
Conservative	Charles Ponsonby	18,893	45.6	
Labour	John Pudney	14,947	36.1	
Liberal	Nelia Muspratt	6,906	16.7	
Communist	K. Thompson	676	1.6	
Majority		3,946	9.5	
Turnout			73.6	
Conservative hold		Swing		

Four general elections later she stood again at Sevenoaks, but did no better;

General election 1959: Sevenoaks
Party	Candidate	Votes	%	±%
Conservative	John Rodgers	28,186	56.1	
Labour	Roderick Ogley	14,265	28.4	
Liberal	Nelia Penman	7,819	15.6	
Majority		13,921	27.7	
Turnout		50,270	80.2	
Conservative hold		Swing		

She stood again at the following election and slightly increased her vote share;

General election 1964: Sevenoaks
Party	Candidate	Votes	%	±%
Conservative	John Rodgers	28,678	52.0	
Labour	Peter Pearce	14,958	27.1	
Liberal	Nelia Penman	11,480	20.8	
Majority		13,720	24.9	
Turnout		55,116	80.1	
Conservative hold		Swing		

She was Chairman of the Liberal Party's Social Security Panel, before resigning in 1977 to become President of the Women's Liberal Federation.

Penman died in August 2017 at the age of 101.

Party political offices
Preceded by Baroness Seear	President of the Women's Liberal Federation; 1977–1978	Succeeded by Meg Budd
