= Liverpool Women's Suffrage Society =

Suffrage society founded in Liverpool, 1894

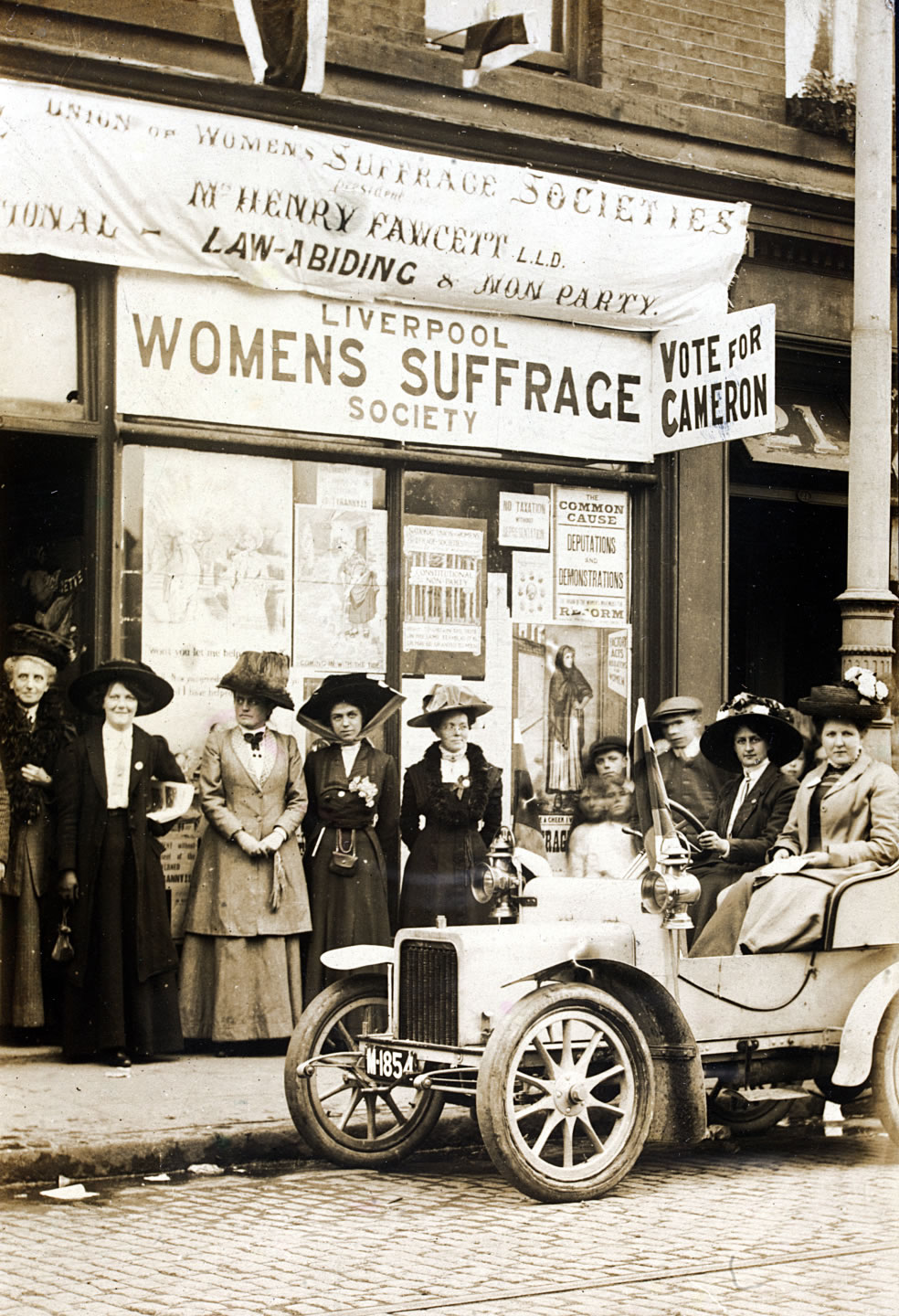
- Liverpool Women's Suffrage Society campaign shop for 1910 Kirkdale by-election
- Abbreviation: LWSS
- Merged into: Liverpool Women Citizen's Association
- Formation: January 1894
- Founders: Edith Bright; Lydia Allen Booth; Nessie Stewart-Brown
- Type: Suffrage society
- Key people: Eleanor Rathbone

The Liverpool Women's Suffrage Society was set up in 1894 by Edith Bright, Lydia Allen Booth and Nessie Stewart-Brown to promote the enfranchisement of women. The society held its first meeting in a Liverpool temperance hall, with Millicent Fawcett, head of the National Union of Women's Suffrage Societies (NUWSS), as its guest speaker. The society set up headquarters in Lord Street. The group became affiliated with the NUWSS in 1898, it held meetings in cafés which included talks, poetry and dance recitals. Members were recruited from prominent members of society and they distanced themselves from working class suffrage societies such as Women's Social and Political Union (WSPU).

Eleanor Rathbone led the society as its secretary from 1897, especially in campaigning in the 1910 elections. Three campaign shops were opened around Liverpool, asking men to vote for candidates who supported votes for women, especially Alexander Gordon Cameron. In 1911, Rathbone and Stewart-Brown set up a branch of the society to educate women who would soon get the vote. When the society disagreed with the NUWSS, it merged with the Municipal Women's Association to create the Liverpool Women's Citizens Association in 1919.

== History ==
The Liverpool Women's Suffrage Society was set up in 1894 at a meeting in January at the temperance hall in Hardman Street. A society had been proposed a month earlier by Emily Hornby at a public meeting and after a unanimous vote, was founded by Edith Allan Bright, Lydia Allen Booth and Nessie Stewart-Brown and initially had twenty four members. The society set up headquarters at 6 Lord Street. Millicent Fawcett, leader of the National Union of Women's Suffrage Societies, attended the first meeting as a guest speaker.

The society distinguished itself from the Women's Social and Political Union (WSPU) and the Independent Labour Party, and became known as respectable "lady suffragists" as opposed to the more militant suffragettes. The society recruited more prestigious members of society, leading to other disenfranchised women (especially those from the working-class) joining the WSPU; the organisation also actively distanced itself from WSPU protests. By the first annual general meeting, on 11 January 1895, the membership had expanded to just 71.

In 1896, the society affiliated with Central National Society for Women's Suffrage, and by 1898 had joined the National Union of Women's Suffrage Societies. Bright invited Christabel Pankhurst to speak in Liverpool on 12 February 1909, which resulted in a "phenomenal demand for membership cards". Pankhurst stayed at Bright's house whilst in the city.

== Goals ==
Liverpool Women's Suffrage Society was formed with the intention of fulfilling a number of goals. It hoped to educate women on why they should have the right to vote and convince men of the same. It had links with Liberal MPs and intended to use these to pressure the government to allow women's suffrage. In addition, the society tried to drum up support for their cause by holding small scale events, often with speakers at the Yamen Cafe in Liverpool's Bond Street. The events would also include poetry, singing or performances of acting or ballet by the Blue Bird Theatre Company.

The society would take part in wider suffrage demonstrations, for example in June 1908, it supported a National Union of Women's Suffrage Societies event in London's Hyde Park and in June 1910 an event by all the Liverpool suffrage organisations at Liverpool's St Georges Hall Eleanor Rathbone lead the society's campaigning in the 1910 Liverpool elections, opening campaign shops on Smithdown Road, Bold Street and Stanley Road, asking men to vote for anyone who would support votes for women, regardless of party. They actively campaigned for the Labour candidate Alexander Gordon Cameron, although he did not win.

== Founders ==
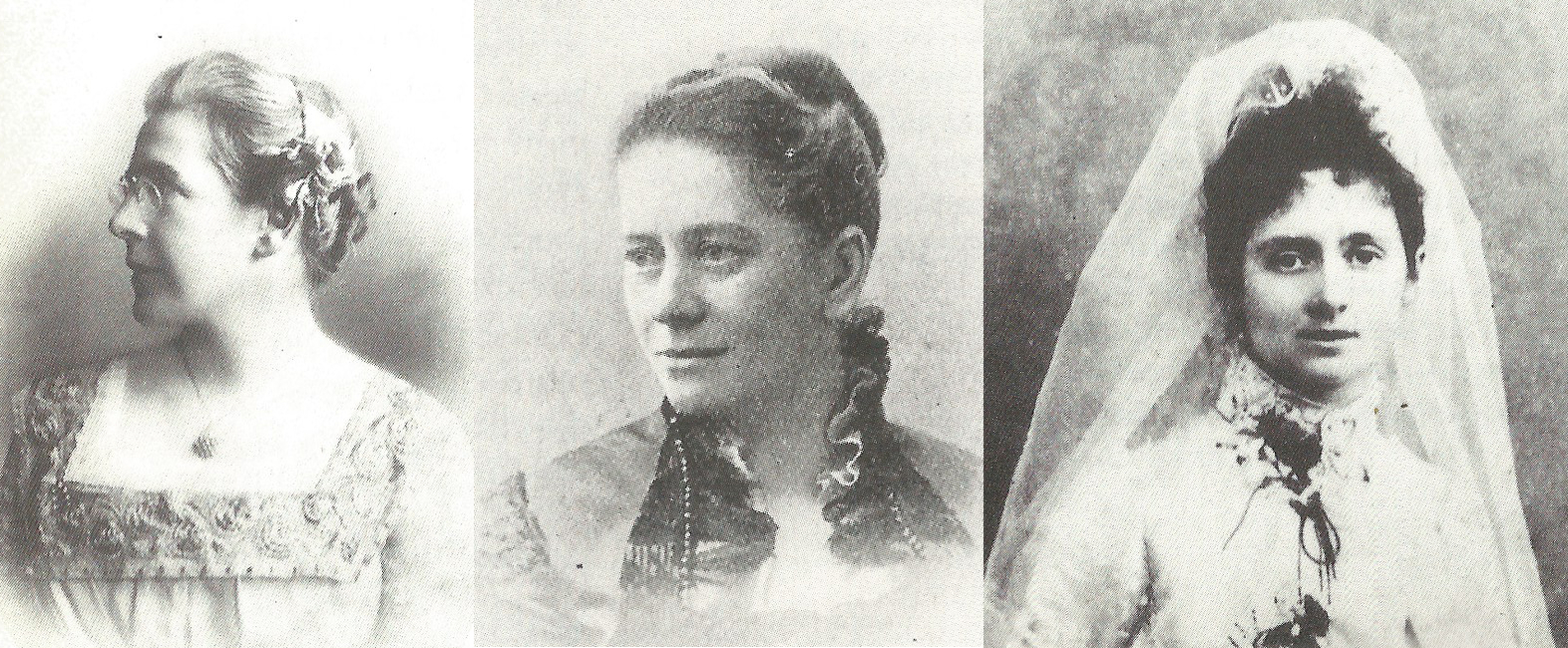
Edith Bright, Lydia Allen Booth and Nessie Stewart-Brown – the three founders of the Liverpool Women's Suffrage Society

The society was founded by three women. Edith Bright served on the executive committee of Liverpool Ladies Union of Workers among Women and Girls. She was involved in other feminist causes such as Mothers Union & National Union of Women Workers and was a driving force for a Liverpool branch of the National Union of Women's Suffrage Societies. Her husband, Allan Heywood Bright, was a shipping merchant and Liberal MP. Lydia Allen Booth (née Butler) was an American who was on the executive committee of Liverpool Ladies Union of Workers among Women and Girls. Nessie Stewart-Brown was president of Liverpool Women's Liberal Association, and worked with Bright in the Mothers' Union and National Union of Women Workers.

=== Secretaries ===
- 1895 – Edith Bright
- 1897 – Eleanor Rathbone
- 1913 – Miss E. E. Deakin and Eleanor Rathbone

== Liverpool Women's Citizen Association ==
In 1911, sensing they were close to achieving suffrage, Rathbone and Stewart-Brown created the Municipal Women's Association as a branch of the society; its aim was to increase awareness of the vote for women, encourage discussion amongst potential women voters and teaching women what to do when they had the vote. In 1912, the Liverpool Women Suffrage Society disagreed with the route that the National Union Women's Suffrage Societies was taking, with its Election Fighting Fund, and instead merged with the Municipal Women's Association to become the Liverpool Women's Citizen's Association. The outbreak of World War I changed the focus of groups to help with the national emergency and in 1919 the groups merged. By 1921 they had 12 branches.

== See also ==
- Women's suffrage in the United Kingdom

== Sources ==
- Helmond, Marij van (1992). Votes for women : the events on Merseyside 1870–1928. Great Britain: National Museums & Galleries on Merseyside. ISBN 090636745X.
- Cowman, Krista (2004). Mrs Brown is a Man and a Brother: Women in Merseyside's Political Organisations, 1890–1920. Liverpool: Liverpool University Press. ISBN 9780853237389.
