= Julia Solly =

British suffragist (1862–1953)

- Born: Julia Frances Muspratt; 21 December 1862; Seaforth, Lancashire, England
- Died: 1953 (aged 90–91); Wynberg, Cape Town, South Africa
- Occupations: social activist, suffragist, pacifist
- Years active: 1888–1940s
- Spouse: Hubert LeGay Solly
- Relatives: Edmund Knowles Muspratt (father); Frances Jane Baines (mother); Nessie Stewart-Brown (sister); Max Muspratt (brother); Nelia Penman (niece)

Julia Frances Solly (née Muspratt; 21 December 1862 – 1953) was a British suffragist, feminist and temperance activist. After her marriage, she moved to South Africa, where she became one of the most recognisable feminists in the Cape Colony. Advocating for suffrage, she co-founded the Cape Branch of the Women's Enfranchisement League (WEL), the first organisation in South Africa created to push for women's right to vote. Active as a pacifist, she was against both the Second Boer War and World War I, but believed that the Nazis must be stopped at all cost. She was also active in many social reform programs and was part of the purity movement. For her work on the National Council of Women, she was awarded the King George Silver Jubilee Medal in 1935.

== Biography ==
Julia Frances Muspratt was born 21 December 1862 at Seaforth Hall, Seaforth, Lancashire, England. to Frances Jane (née Baines) and Edmund Knowles Muspratt. She attended the Cheltenham Ladies' College and she and her sister Nessie were some of the first female students at University College, Liverpool. Muspratt studied botany with professor Harvey Gibson and focused on the flora of South Africa. After graduating, she made a trip to the Americas with her father, travelling first to Canada to attend the British Association meeting in Montreal and then touring from the Pacific Northwest coast of the United States all the way back to New York City before heading home.

In the late 1880s, Muspratt joined the local Women's Liberal Federation (WLF) West Toxteth branch of which her sister Nessie Stewart-Brown was president, along with her mother, her aunt Ann Neal Muspratt (Mrs. Sheridan), her sister Stella Permewan (née Muspratt) and her sister-in-law Helena Agnes Dalrymple Ainsworth (wife of her brother Max Muspratt). On 15 June 1890, she married Hubert LeGay Solly (23 April 1856 – 1 December 1912) an English engineer who was working abroad due to health issues for the South African government on the railroads. That same year, the couple moved to De Aar, where Solly joined the Woman's Christian Temperance Union. By 1895 she was serving as superintendent of its suffrage unit. An ardent pacifist, she sent letters to her father during the Second Boer War, recounting atrocities of the conflict Soon after the war ended, her husband retired in 1904 because of his health problems and settled on his farm near Knor Hoek, Sir Lowry's Pass, Cape Colony. In 1907, Solly helped found Cape Branch of the Women's Enfranchisement League (WEL), the first organisation in South Africa created to gain women the right to vote. She became a correspondent of Olive Schreiner and their letters mainly have to do with suffrage business. Schreiner was concerned about factionalism and exhorted Solly to put aside religious or racial differences and eliminate divisive elements, like one-time president, Irene Macfadyen (1907–1908), who was simultaneously a member of an anti-women's suffrage group. Solly became one of the most recognisable figures in the Cape Colony's suffrage movement.

By the time of her husband's 1912 death, Solly was almost exclusively working in Cape Town where she joined the National Council of Women in 1913. During World War I, Solly co-founded, with Unitarian minister Ramsden Balmforth, the South African Peace and Arbitration Society. Though they presented reasoned arguments for peace, few wanted to hear them. She was the first woman to join the South African Association for the Advancement of Science, writing treatises about the science of war and its negative impact on society. In 1916, she became vice-president of the Association for Moral and Social Hygiene and wrote pamphlets and articles about the dangers of vice. Around the same time she joined the International Federation for the Abolition of State Regulation of Vice, in an attempt to redirect misguided prostitutes lured by the excitement of the moment. The NCW women took to the streets in brigades to patrol neighbourhoods. Solly stood for election in 1918 as a candidate for the Salt River Municipality but was defeated. In the first half of the 1920s, Solly wrote The Women's Charter which was then translated into Afrikaans and sent out to all branches of the Nasionale Vroueparty (National Women's Party) by its executive.

"In 1926 Julia Solly argued before the parliamentary select committee that women needed the vote as a 'home-protection weapon'", meaning that allowing women to vote would protect families. Women's suffrage in South Africa was complicated by the fear that the black majority would become empowered. Solly, used these fears to women's advantage stressing that if white women were given the vote, it would increase the white voters. Finally, on 11 April 1930, with a 40-vote majority, Prime Minister Albert Hertzog's government approved voting rights for white women on par with those of white men. By 1935, Solly was serving as vice-president of the National Council of Women and was awarded the King George V Silver Jubilee Medal in that year for her service. Solly and Balmforth abandoned their pacifist stance during World War II, believing that Hitler had to be defeated at all costs. Solly died in 1953 in Wynberg, Cape Town, South Africa.

== See also ==
- List of peace activists
