= Nessie Stewart-Brown =

British suffragist and Liberal Party politician (1864–1958)

Nessie Stewart-Brown

Nessie Stewart-Brown JP (née Muspratt; 5 September 1864 – 7 April 1958) was a British suffragist and Liberal Party politician. Her name and picture is on the plinth of the statue of Millicent Fawcett in Parliament Square.

== Background ==
Nessie Muspratt was born at Seaforth Hall, Seaforth, near Liverpool, a daughter of Frances Jane Baines and Edmund Knowles Muspratt of Muspratt & Co. Chemical Works, later the United Alkali Company Ltd. The Muspratt family were supporters of the Liberal Party and she was an elder sister of the Liberal MP Max Muspratt and South African suffragist Julia Solly. She was also an aunt of Nelia Penman, who served as President of the Women's Liberal Federation. She was educated at Cheltenham Ladies' College, Liverpool University, Paris and Leipzig. She married Egerton Stewart-Brown in Sefton Church on 13 September 1888.

== Political career ==
Stewart-Brown became Honorary Secretary of the ladies' branch of the Liverpool Royal Society for the Prevention of Cruelty to Animals. She joined the Women's Liberal Federation in Liverpool and helped form branches at West Derby and Wavertree and served as President for the West Toxteth branch. In 1891 she began speaking for women's suffrage. She was the first woman to speak on a municipal platform when her husband stood for Liverpool City Council in 1892. In the same year she was elected to the national executive committee of the Women's Liberal Federation, a body on which she served for many years. In 1894 she co-founded the Liverpool Women's Suffrage Society (local branch of the National Union of Women's Suffrage Societies NUWSS) with Mrs Alfred Booth and Edith Bright, at a meeting at which Millicent Fawcett was the guest speaker. She became its branch chairman. She became President of the Liverpool Women's Liberal Association and President of the Lancashire & Cheshire Union of the Women's Liberal Association. In October 1911, with Eleanor Rathbone she founded a new society, the Municipal Women's Association, aimed at 'awakening ...interest on the question of women's suffrage amongst women municipal voters'. As a committed Liberal and Suffragist, she opposed the actions of the militant Suffragettes. In 1912 she opposed the establishment of the NUWSS's election fighting fund which was intended for campaigning against Liberal candidates in by-elections and attempts to align the NUWSS with the Labour Party. Following the outbreak of the First World War in 1914 she switched her focus to relief work, helping the Scottish Women's Hospitals' Association and the Liverpool branch of the National Union of Women Workers. After the war she became Liverpool branch Chairman of the Women's International League and was on the executive of the Liverpool branch of the League of Nations Union. In 1919, standing as a Liberal candidate, she became only the second woman to be elected to Liverpool City Council. She was Liberal candidate for the safe Unionist seat of Waterloo, a division of Lancashire at the 1922 General Election. She did not stand for parliament again. She became President of the Waterloo Women's Liberal Association. In 1924 she became one of the first women appointed a Justice of the peace, serving on the Liverpool bench. She was President of the Liverpool National Council of Women, Vice-Chairman of the Council of Women Citizens and Chairman of the Liverpool Liberal Council.

== Posthumous recognition ==
She died in 1958 aged 93. Her name and picture (and those of 58 other women's suffrage supporters) are on the plinth of the statue of Millicent Fawcett in Parliament Square, London, unveiled in April 2018.

General Election 1922: Waterloo
Party	Candidate	Votes	%	±%
Unionist	Albert Buckley	12,967	67.3	
Liberal	Nessie Stewart-Brown	6,300	32.7	
Majority		6,667	34.6	
Turnout		19,267	69.4	
Unionist hold		Swing		
