= Ashcroftine-(Y) =

Rare yttrium-bearing inosilicate mineral

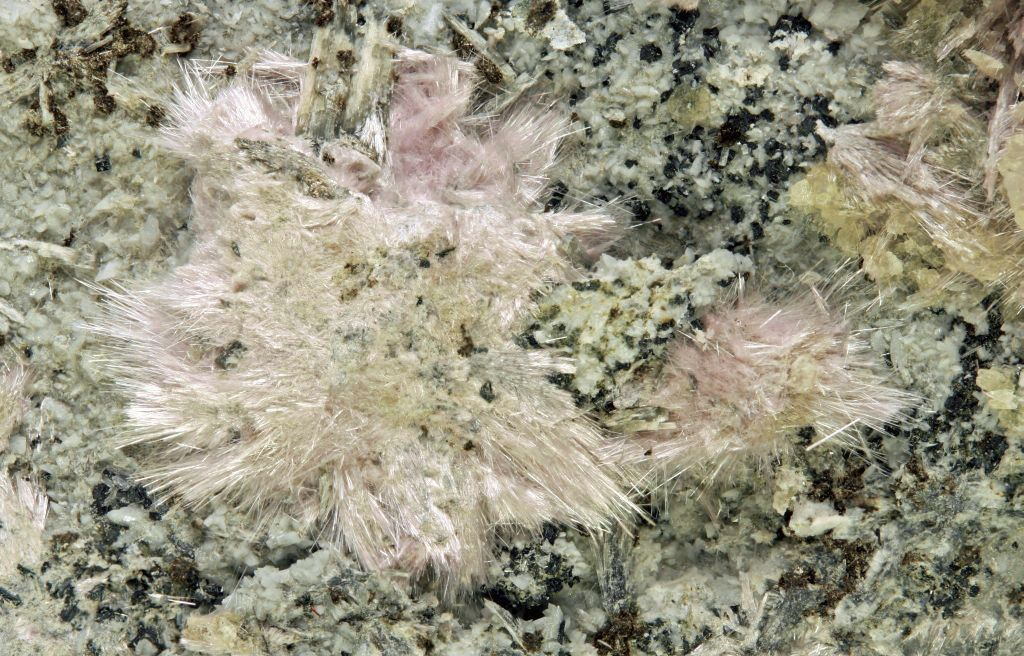
- Ashcroftine-(Y) from Quebec

General
- Category: Inosilicate
- Formula: K_{5}Na_{5}(Y,Ca)_{12}Si_{28}O_{70}(OH)_{2}(CO_{3})_{8} · 8H_{2}O
- IMA symbol: Acf-Y
- Strunz classification: 9.DN.15
- Dana classification: 70.03.01.01
- Crystal system: Tetragonal

Identification
- Color: Pink
- Crystal habit: Acicular to fibrous; intergrowths of fine needle-like crystals; radial-fibrous and matted-fibrous aggregates
- Cleavage: Perfect on {100}; distinct on {001}
- Mohs scale hardness: 5
- Luster: Vitreous, may be silky
- Streak: White
- Diaphaneity: Transparent to translucent
- Specific gravity: 2.61
- Optical properties: Uniaxial (+)
- Refractive index: n_{ω} = 1.536–1.537; n_{ε} = 1.545–1.549

Ashcroftine-(Y) is a rare, hydrous, yttrium-bearing inosilicate mineral containing potassium, sodium, and calcium, together with hydroxide and carbonate anions. Its idealized chemical formula is K_{5}Na_{5}(Y,Ca)_{12}Si_{28}O_{70}(OH)_{2}(CO_{3})_{8} · 8H_{2}O. It was named after the British mineral collector Frederick Noel Ashcroft (1878–1949), a benefactor of the British Museum (Natural History).

== Description ==
Ashcroftine-(Y) crystallizes in the tetragonal crystal system. It is generally pale pink and transparent to translucent, with a measured specific gravity of 2.61. Its crystals are typically needle-like or fibrous and may occur as fine intergrowths, divergent sprays, or radial-fibrous and matted-fibrous aggregates. Its cleavage is perfect on {100} and distinct on {001}.

== Occurrence ==
The type locality is the Narssârssuk pegmatite in southern Greenland, where ashcroftine-(Y) occurs in cavities in alkaline syenite. It has also been found in igneous breccia and pegmatites of the intrusive alkaline gabbro–syenite complex at the Poudrette quarry, Mont Saint-Hilaire, Quebec, Canada, and at Cava dell'Osa, near Rome, Lazio, Italy.

== Kola ashcroftine phase ==
A study published on 7 May 2026 described a previously collected, ashcroftine-related mineral phase from the Kirovsky mine in the Khibiny alkaline massif on the Kola Peninsula, Russia. The phase, designated KA, has the idealized formula K_{6}(Na_{4}Ca)(Y_{8}Ca_{3}Mn)[Si_{28}O_{68}(OH)_{2}](CO_{3})_{8}F_{2} · 9H_{2}O. It contains calcium, manganese, and fluorine, and its crystal structure includes silicate nanotubules.

== See also ==
- List of minerals named after people
