= Holy Trinity Church, Wavertree =

Coordinates: 53.3945°N 2.9158°W

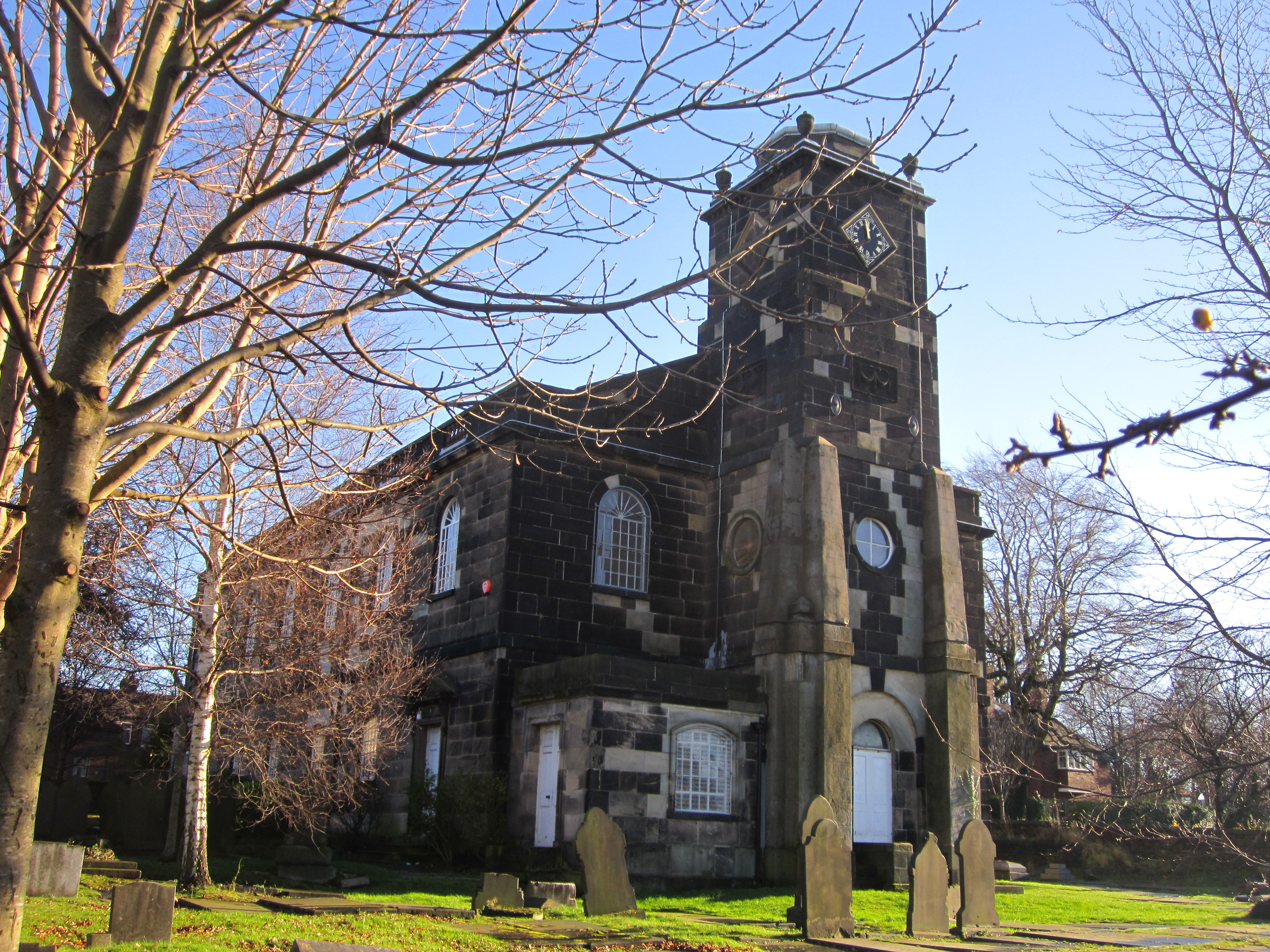
- Holy Trinity Church, Wavertree, from the northwest

- Location in Merseyside
- OS grid reference: SJ 392 890
- Location: Church Road, Wavertree, Liverpool, Merseyside L15 9EQ
- Country: England
- Denomination: Anglican
- Churchmanship: Traditional Church or England
- Website: Holy Trinity, Wavertree

History
- Status: Parish church
- Consecrated: 5 August 1794

Architecture
- Functional status: Active
- Heritage designation: Grade II*
- Designated: 28 June 1952
- Architect(s): John Hope, Charles Reilly
- Architectural type: Church
- Style: Georgian, Neoclassical
- Groundbreaking: 1794
- Completed: 1911

Specifications
- Materials: Stone, slate roof

Administration
- Province: York
- Diocese: Liverpool
- Archdeaconry: Liverpool
- Deanery: Toxteth and Wavertree
- Parish: Holy Trinity, Wavertree

Clergy
- Rector: The Revd. RJE Clack M.A.

Holy Trinity Church is in Church Road, Wavertree, Liverpool, Merseyside, England. It is an active Anglican parish church in the diocese of Liverpool, the archdeaconry of Liverpool, and the deanery of Toxteth and Wavertree. The church is recorded in the National Heritage List for England as a designated Grade II* listed building. It was described by John Betjeman as "Liverpool's best Georgian church".

== History ==
Holy Trinity was built in 1794 as a chapel of ease to All Saints' Church, Childwall, and was designed by John Hope. The church was consecrated on 5 August 1794 by Rt Revd William Cleaver, bishop of Chester. It became a separate parish in its own right in 1867. In 1911 the church was reordered, and the east end was rebuilt, by Charles Reilly. At the east end he added a bay and an apse, creating a chancel. The north and south galleries were removed, and a baptistery was created at the base of the tower. In the 1950s the tower was found to be unstable, and its upper parts, consisting of superimposed cupolas, were removed. In 1961, and again in 1971, the church had to be restored following serious fires.

== Architecture ==
=== Exterior ===
The church is constructed in stone with a slate roof. The body of the church is in Georgian style, and the east end is Neoclassical. Its plan consists of a five-bay nave, an apsidal chancel, and a west tower containing the baptistry. The tower has a west window (which was formerly a door), above which is a circular window and decorated panels. Towards the top of the tower are diamond-shaped clock faces on all sides, and on the top is the base of the truncated cupola. Along the sides of the church are windows in two tiers, the lower ones having segmental heads, and the larger upper ones having round heads. Attached to the tower are large buttresses in the form of obelisks. In each west bay is an entrance with a pediment on a bracket. At the east end there is also a pedimented entrance on both sides, above which is a rectangular window with an architrave, a frieze, and a cornice. In the apse are three round-headed windows.

=== Interior ===
Inside the church is a west gallery carried on quatrefoil iron columns. The nave ceiling is flat with a central rose, the baptistry has a saucer-shaped dome, and the apse is vaulted. In the chancel are large pilasters rising to pillars, forming lateral spaces which include a vestry and an organ chamber. Above the entrances to these are pediments surmounted by urns. The marble font has a shallow bowl, the pulpit is square and panelled with a dentilled cornice, and the shaft of the lectern consists of a fluted Greek Doric column; all these are in Neoclassical style. The pipe organ was built in 1972 by J. W. Walker.

== External features ==
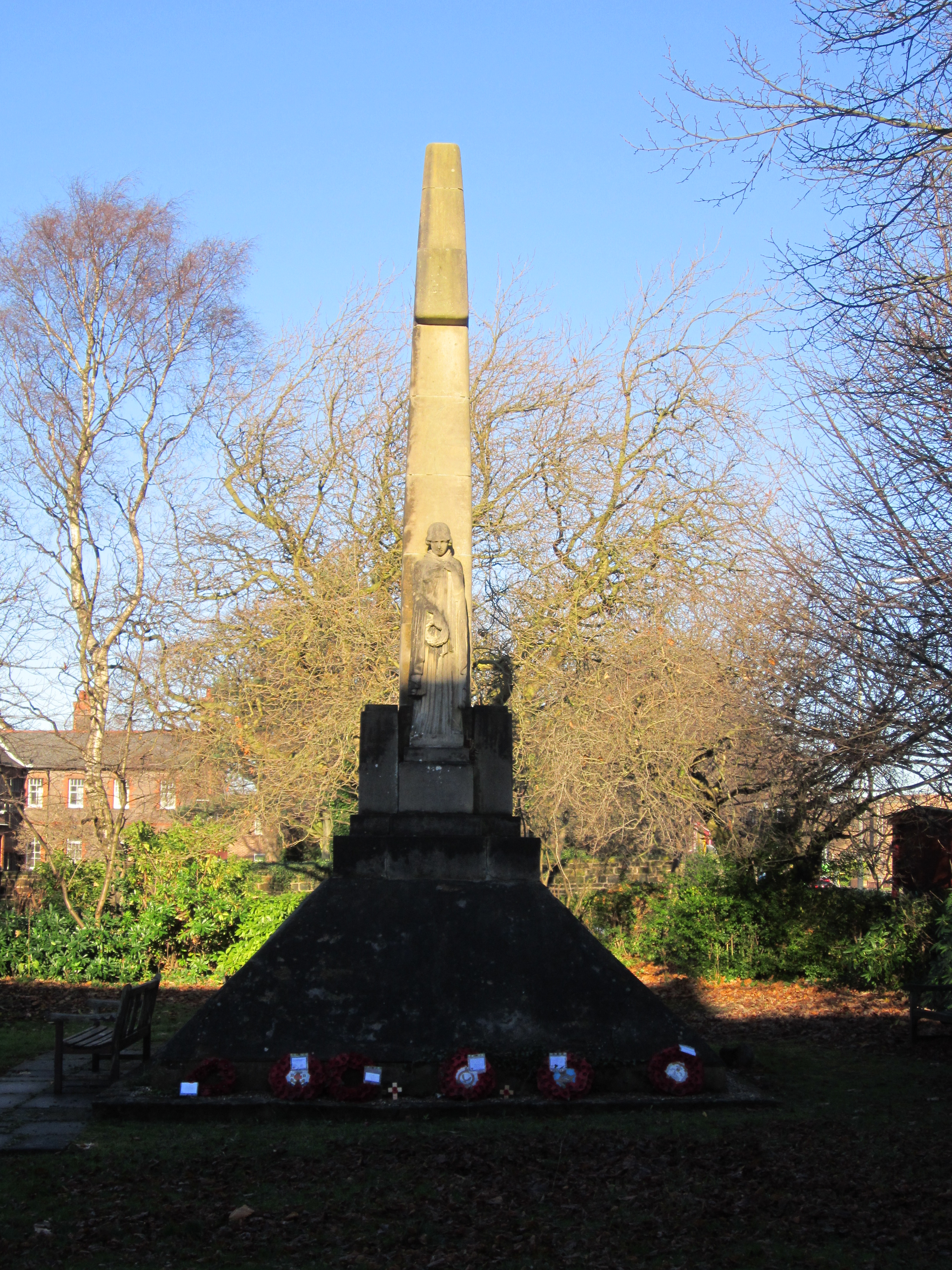
War memorial

In the churchyard is a war memorial dating from about 1920. It is constructed in Portland stone, and was designed by H. Tyson Smith. The upright has a rectangular section, and the cross arms are short. It is flanked by female figures clothed in classical drapery holding laurel leaves, and standing on a rendered pyramidal plinth. On the front of the memorial is a panel carrying an inscription, and on the back is a relief of a pelican feeding her young. The memorial is listed at Grade II*. The churchyard also contains the war graves of 11 British service personnel of World War I and 17 of World War II.

== See also ==
- Grade II* listed buildings in Merseyside
