= Ramsden Balmforth =

English-South African clergyman and author

Reverend Ramsden Balmforth
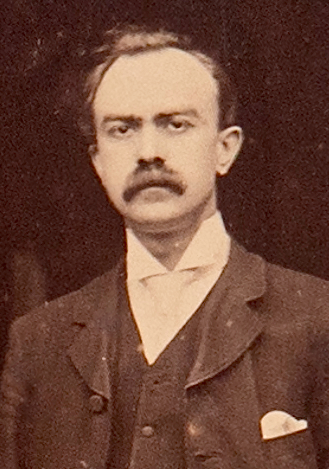
- Balmforth in 1894
- Born: 13 January 1861; Huddersfield, England
- Died: 31 December 1941 (aged 80); Cape Town, South Africa
- Occupations: Clergyman, author

Ramsden Balmforth (13 January 1861 – 31 December 1941) was an English-born Unitarian minister and author who spent much of his adult life in South Africa.

== Early life ==
Balmforth was born in Huddersfield, England, in 1861, the son of Nanny (née Moorhouse) and Watts Balmforth. His father was a mechanic and a secularist.

As a young man, Balmforth joined the Fabian Society and became a friend of George Bernard Shaw. In 1886 he published a socialist-themed novel (his only work of fiction) under the pseudonym "Laon Ramsey".

In 1893, he married Agnes Ellam (1865–1945); the couple had two daughters and one son.

In 1894, he entered Manchester College, Oxford, where he studied theology and became a Unitarian minister. After serving as minister of the Huddersfield Unitarian church, he emigrated to South Africa in 1897.

== South African career ==
Balmforth served as minister of Cape Town's Free Protestant (Unitarian) Church from 1897–1937, succeeding David Faure. He published a number of books and articles on theology, politics, pacifism, and literature, and was one of the first clergymen to preach on South African radio. During World War I, Balmforth co-founded, with Julia Solly, the South African Peace and Arbitration Society.

He died in Cape Town on 31 December 1941.

== Selected bibliography ==
- Landon Deecroft: a socialistic novel (1886; published under the pseudonym Laon Ramsey)
- The New Reformation and its relation to moral and social problems (1893)
- The Evolution of Christianity (1898)
- Some Social and Political Pioneers of the Nineteenth Century (1900)
- The Bible from the Standpoint of the Higher Criticism: The Old Testament (1904)
- The New Testament in the Light of the Higher Criticism (1905)
- The Ethical and Religious Value of the Novel (1912)
- Drama, Music-drama, and Religion as illustrated by Wagner's "Ring of the Nibelung" and "Parsifal" (1913)
- The Theory of Evolution and Its Influences on Religious Thought (1921)
- The Ethical and Religious Value of the Drama (1926)
- The Problem-play and its Influence on Modern Thought and Life (1928)
- Jesus the Man (1935)
