= Denis Peel =

English cricketer

Personal information
- Full name: Denis Heywood Peel
- Born: 1 February 1886; Wavertree, Liverpool, Lancashire, England
- Died: 25 October 1927 (aged 41); Montana, Valais, Switzerland
- Batting: Unknown
- Bowling: Unknown
- Relatives: Bertram Peel (brother)

Domestic team information
- Years: Team
- 1906–1913: Bedfordshire
- 1907: Oxford University

Career statistics
| Competition | First-class |
|---|---|
| Matches | 3 |
| Runs scored | 6 |
| Batting average | 1.80 |
| 100s/50s | –/– |
| Top score | 9 |
| Balls bowled | 364 |
| Wickets | 3 |
| Bowling average | 56.33 |
| 5 wickets in innings | – |
| 10 wickets in match | – |
| Best bowling | 1/32 |
| Catches/stumpings | 1/– |
- Source: Cricinfo, 27 July 2019

Denis Heywood Peel (1 February 1886 – 25 October 1927) was an English first-class cricketer.

The son of Edward Peel, he was born in Wavertree, Liverpool in February 1886. He was educated at Bedford School, before going up to Balliol College, Oxford. While at Oxford, he made his debut in first-class cricket for Oxford University against Surrey at The Oval in 1907. He made two further first-class appearances for Oxford in 1907, against the Marylebone Cricket Club at Lord's and Sussex at Eastbourne. He scored 9 runs in his three matches and took 3 wickets, with best figures of 1 for 32. In addition to playing first-class cricket, Peel also played minor counties cricket for Bedfordshire from 1906–13, albeit intermittently, making nine appearances in the Minor Counties Championship. He died in Switzerland at Montana in October 1927. His brother, Bertram, was also a first-class cricketer.
