= Susan Webb Cushman =

19th-century American actress

- Born: 17 March 1822; Boston, Massachusetts, U.S.
- Died: 10 May 1859 (aged 37); Liverpool, England
- Occupation: Actress
- Spouse: James Sheridan Muspratt
- Children: 3

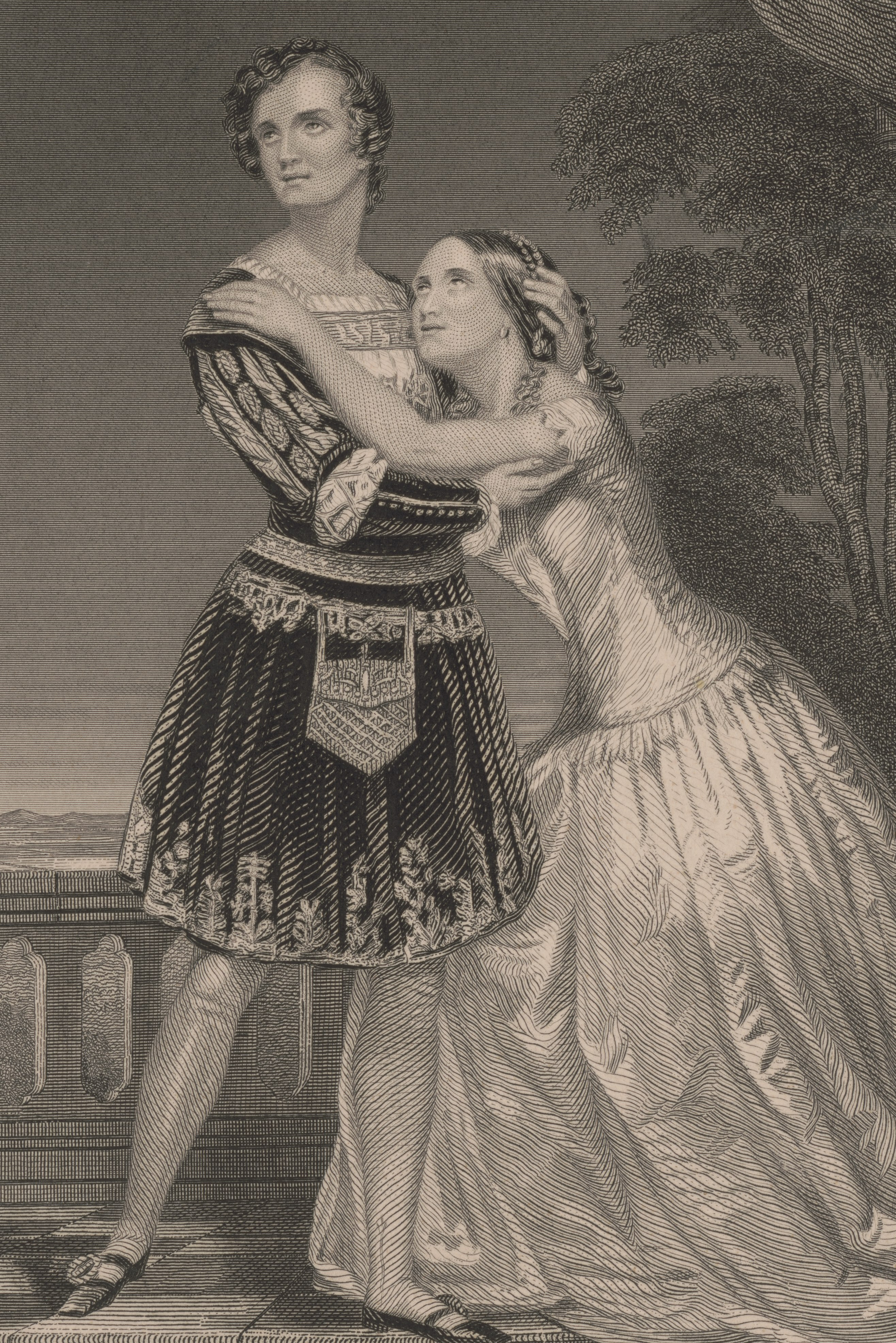
Susan (right) with her sister Charlotte as Romeo and Juliet

Susan Webb Cushman (17 March 1822 – 10 May 1859) was a Boston, Massachusetts-born American actress, the younger sister of established actress Charlotte Cushman.

Susan Cushman débuted in Epes Sargent's play, The Genoese in 1836, a year after a trip with her mother to see Charlotte, an up-and-coming actress, in New York City and Albany, New York.

== American career ==
Following a failed marriage that same year to Nelson Meriman, after which he left her destitute with a child, she followed Charlotte's advice to pursue an acting career with her. Together they acted in New York City and Philadelphia, circa 1841–1842, as Grace Harkaway (Susan) and Lady Gay Spanker (Charlotte). She received acclaim in the play Satan in Paris and played Desdemona to George Vandenhoff's Othello.

In 1842 Susan was a member and Charlotte a stage manager of the Walnut Street Theatre in Philadelphia, where Vandenhoff performed for six nights for $180. Vandenhoff later acknowledged both Charlotte's and Susan's cool-headedness in his autobiographical book entitled Leaves from an Actor's Notebook. In it he wrote that Susan was "a pretty creature, but had not a spark of Charlotte's genius..." and that "she pleased 'the fellows', however, and was the best walking-lady on the American stage".

== Migration to England ==
Susan followed Charlotte to England in 1845. On 30 December 1845, at the Haymarket in London, they were so successful in playing Romeo and Juliet, respectively, (using the original version as opposed to theatre prompt) before an audience who labeled them as "American Indians", that they continued there for eighty nights before touring England. Although Charlotte, who enjoyed playing masculine roles, was a good showman and received acclaim from critics, they also praised Susan for the "grace and delicacy of her acting". Sheridan Knowles commended Charlotte primarily, but, in regards to Susan, lauded the first act as being "admirably personated by her beautiful sister". The sisters played together in Twelfth Night.

In 1848 Susan enraged a theatre manager during the rehearsal presentations for The Lady of Lyons in which she was to play the part of "Helen" to Mrs. Anna Cora Mowatt's undisclosed part. When Susan walked in late during the manager's audition of a replacement actress, an angry scene developed which, by Mrs. Mowatt's account, was "such as I never before, and I rejoice to say never after, witnessed in a theatre". Susan was forced to leave.

== Marriage and death ==
Later in 1848, Susan married James Sheridan Muspratt, and retired from the stage, living in Liverpool until her death in 1859, aged 37. The couple had three children.
