= Belzan =

Restaurant in Liverpool, England

- Interactive map of Belzan

Restaurant information
- Established: 2017; 9 years ago
- Owners: Chris Edwards; Owain Williams; Sam Grainger
- Head chef: Mark Dickey
- Food type: Casual fine dining
- Location: Liverpool, England
- Coordinates: 53°23′30.5″N 2°55′56.0″W
- Website: belzan.co.uk

Belzan is a casual fine dining bistro on Smithdown Road in Liverpool, England. Opened in 2017, it has been named one of the best restaurants in the UK by The Good Food Guide and featured in the Michelin Guide.

== History ==
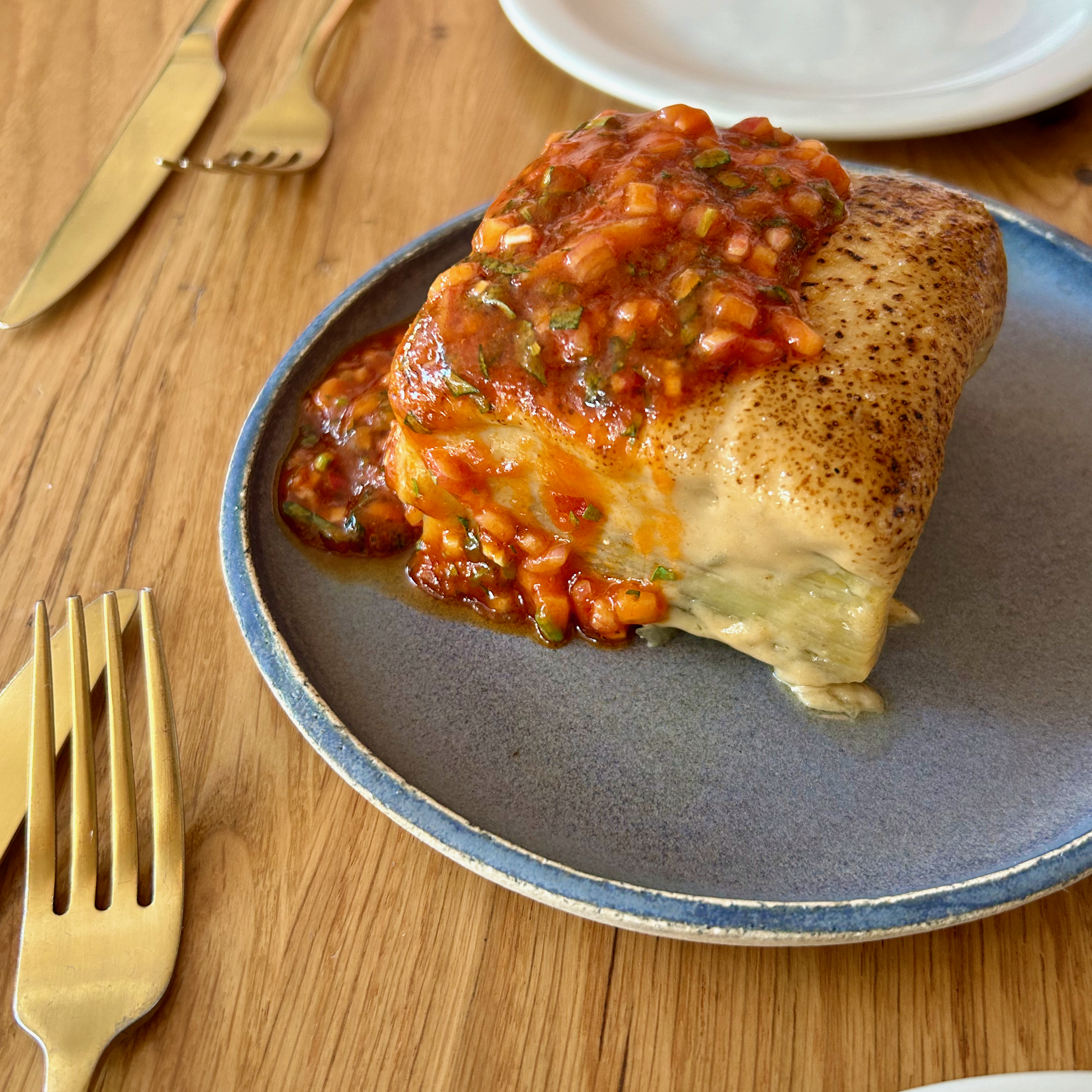
Belzan's Guinness rarebit potato

Belzan was opened in 2017 by friends Chris Edwards, Owain Williams, and Sam Grainger. Williams had previously worked at Liverpool's Hope Street Hotel. Grainger is also executive chef and has been a contestant on Great British Menu.

== Description ==
Belzan is a modern bistro. The Michelin Guide commented on its "cosy" interior and "unassuming location", while both The Guardian and Lonely Planet described its style as relaxed but sometimes challenging.

Talking to BBC Radio Merseyside, Grainger described the restaurant's cuisine as fine dining with seasonal British produce. He tries to cook with ingredients from within 30 miles of the restaurant as much as possible, such as using pumpkins from a customer's local allotment and wild garlic from Sefton Park.

The restaurant's signature dish is a serving of Anna potatoes baked with a Guinness rarebit top and served with a Bois Boudran-style sauce of tomato, tarragon, and vinegar. The Guardian writer Grace Dent notably said that the highlight of her visit was being served rice pudding flavoured with tonka beans, which are banned in the United States due to being fatal in large doses.

== Reception ==
Belzan has been named as one of 100 best local restaurants in the UK by The Good Food Guide. In 2023, it was featured in the Michelin Guide. It has also been noted as one of Liverpool's best restaurants by The Guardian, Conde Nast Traveller, Time Out, and BBC Good Food. Delicious magazine listed it as one of the best restaurants in the country for solo dining.

== In popular culture ==
In May 2023, American actor and comedian Will Ferrell made headlines when he dined at Belzan whilst in Liverpool to attend the Eurovision Song Contest. In May 2024, Lord of the Rings actors Billy Boyd, Orlando Bloom, Dominic Monaghan, and Elijah Wood ate at the restaurant during a stay in Liverpool for Comic Con, with Grainger calling them "really great, nice guys who had an amazing laugh [and] nearly ate the whole menu".
