= Bertram Peel =

English cricketer

Personal information
- Full name: Bertram Lennox Peel
- Born: 19 April 1881; Wavertree, Liverpool, Lancashire, England
- Died: 19 January 1945 (aged 63); Edinburgh, Midlothian, Scotland
- Batting: Right-handed
- Bowling: Right-arm slow
- Relatives: Denis Peel (brother)

Domestic team information
- Years: Team
- 1900–1914: Bedfordshire
- 1903: Oxford University
- 1905–1912: Scotland

Career statistics
Competition	First-class
Matches	10
Runs scored	288
Batting average	16.00
100s/50s	–/2
Top score	74
Balls bowled	394
Wickets	10
Bowling average	24.90
5 wickets in innings	–
10 wickets in match	–
Best bowling	4/123
Catches/stumpings	4/–
- Source: Cricinfo, 28 July 2019

Bertram Lennox Peel (19 April 1881 – 19 February 1945) was an English first-class cricketer.

The son of Edward Peel, he was born in Wavertree, Liverpool in April 1881. He was educated at Bedford School, before going up to Hertford College, Oxford. While at Oxford, he made his debut in first-class cricket for Oxford University against Somerset at Oxford in 1903, with Peel making four further first-class appearances for Oxford in 1907. After graduating from Oxford, he became a schoolteacher, moving to Edinburgh shortly after graduating to teach. While in Scotland, he made five appearances for Scotland in first-class cricket between 1905–12. In ten first-class matches, Peel scored a total of 288 runs at an average of 16.00 and a high score of 74 against the touring South Africans in 1907. With his right-arm slow bowling, he took 10 wickets with best figures of 4 for 123. In addition to playing first-class cricket, Peel also played minor counties cricket for Bedfordshire from 1900–14, making 56 appearances. He died at Edinburgh in January 1945.
