= Roger Aindow =

English footballer

Personal information
- Full name: Roger Allen Aindow
- Date of birth: 23 October 1946 (age 80)
- Place of birth: Seaforth, England
- Position: Defender

Senior career*
Years	Team	Apps	(Gls)
1966–1967	Blackpool	0	(0)
1967–1971	Southport	58	(4)
1971–1972	Great Harwood	?	(?)
1972–1973	Runcorn	?	(?)
1973–1976	Skelmersdale United	?	(?)
1976–1978	South Liverpool	?	(?)
1979–1980	Rhyl	?	(?)
1980–1981	Formby	?	(?)
1983–1984	Ellesmere Port Town	?	(?)
1984	Prescot Cables	?	(?)
1984–1985	Fleetwood Hesketh	?	(?)
- * Club domestic league appearances and goals

Roger Allen Aindow (born 23 October 1946) is an English former professional footballer who played as a defender.

== Football career ==
As a youth with Litherland Schoolboys, Aindow primarily played in goal but was converted to defense when he signed for Blackpool in September 1966. He failed to break into the first team at Blackpool and joined Football League Third Division side Southport in October 1967, initially as an amateur. He turned professional in the summer of 1969 and went on to play 58 times for the Sandgrounders, scoring four goals. After leaving the club at the end of the 1970–71 season, Aindow had a long career in non-League football and had a spell in Wales with Rhyl. He played in the West Lancashire League for Fleetwood Hesketh before retiring in 1985.

== Personal life ==
Aindow was born in the town of Seaforth, Merseyside, and currently lives in Formby, where he worked in the motor trade.
