= James Valiant =

English cricketer

Personal information
- Full name: James Valiant
- Born: 17 July 1884; Wavertree, Liverpool, England
- Died: 28 October 1917 (aged 33); Gaza, Ottoman Syria
- Batting: Unknown
- Bowling: Unknown

Domestic team information
- Years: Team
- 1912: Essex

Career statistics
Competition	First-class
Matches	1
Runs scored	3
Batting average	3.00
100s/50s	–/–
Top score	3
Balls bowled	24
Wickets	–
Bowling average	–
5 wickets in innings	–
10 wickets in match	–
Best bowling	–
Catches/stumpings	–/–
- Source: Cricinfo, 21 April 2012

James Valiant (17 July 1884 – 28 October 1917) was an English cricketer. Valiant's batting and bowling styles are unknown.

The son of a Liverpool butcher, Valiant played Second XI cricket for his native Lancashire in 1908, before moving south to Essex. Valiant later made his first-class debut for Essex against Northamptonshire at the County Ground, Northampton, in the 1912 County Championship. Northamptonshire won the toss and elected to bat, making 278 in their first-innings, during which Valiant bowled four wicketless overs. In response, Essex made just 60 all out, with Valiant ending the innings not out on 0. Forced to follow-on, Essex fared little better in their second-innings, being dismissed for just 80, with Valiant the last man out when he was caught and bowled by Sydney Smith for 3. Essex lost the match by an innings and 137 runs. This was his only major appearance for Essex.

Valiant served in the Royal Welsh Fusiliers during World War I. In July 1917, he was promoted from the rank of 2nd lieutenant to lieutenant. He died at Gaza on 28 October 1917, from wounds sustained the previous day during the Battle of El Buggar Ridge. He is buried in the Beersheba War Cemetery in modern-day Israel.
