= Smithdown Road =

Historic street in Liverpool, England

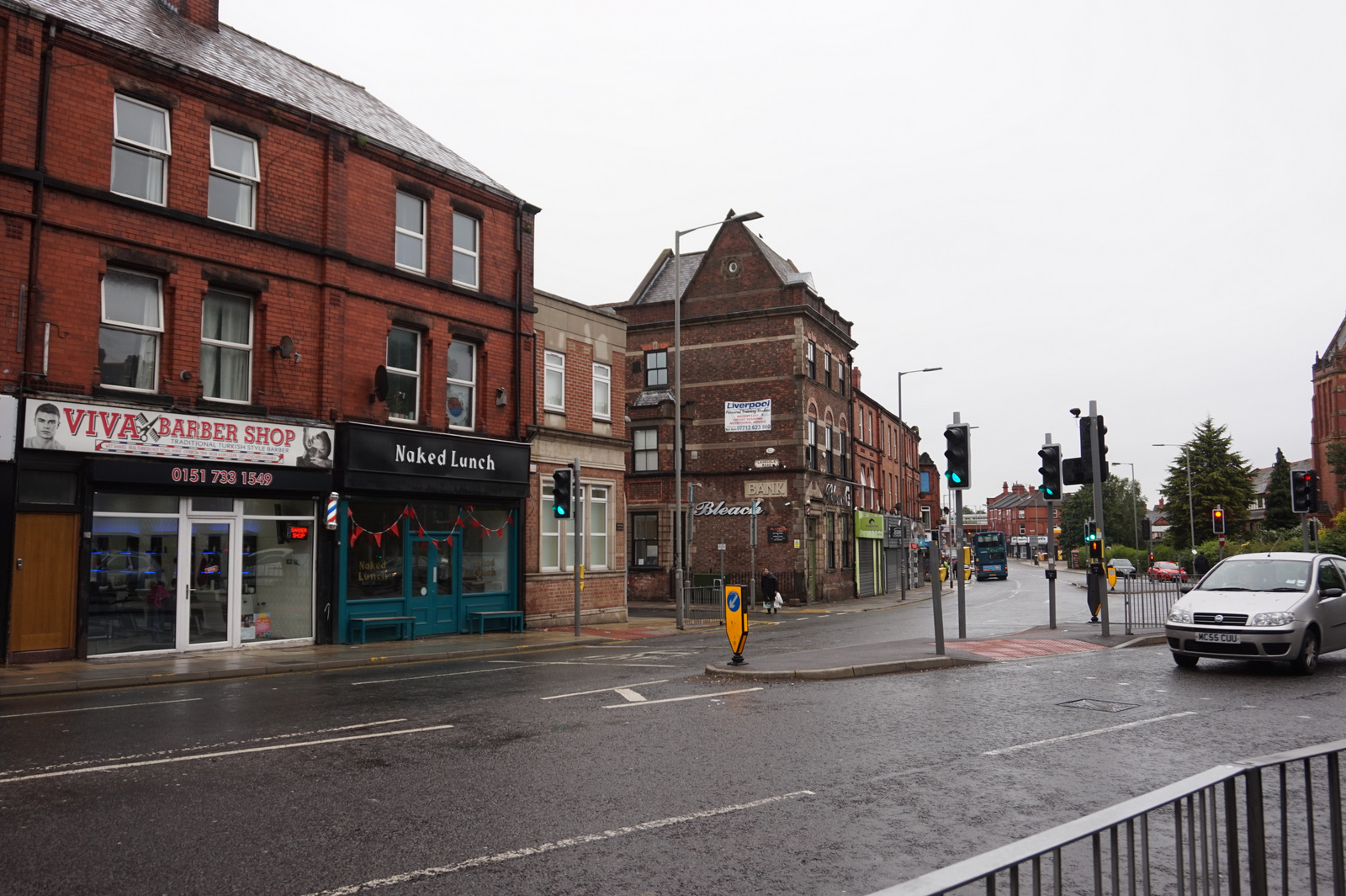
- Smithdown Road

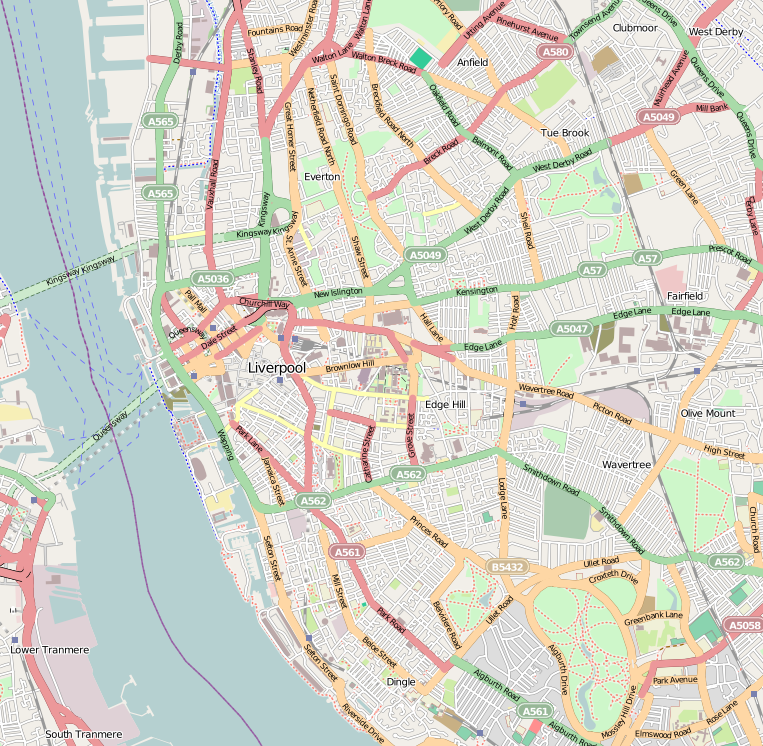
- Location within Liverpool
- Part of: A562 road
- Location: Toxteth, Wavertree
- Postal code: L7, L15
- Coordinates: 53.39519°N 2.93889°W

Other
- Known for: Residential, supermarkets, shops, pubs, restaurants, student accommodation

Smithdown Road is a historic street in Liverpool, England, which now forms part of the A562. The area was previously known as Smithdown (Esmedune or Smeedon in Olde English) and dates back to 1086 when it was listed in the Domesday Book. The causeway that actually became what is now Smithdown Road emerges in documentation around 1775.

It is currently the location of Toxteth Park Cemetery, Wavertree Playground and was previously the location of Sefton General Hospital, known as the Smithdown Hospital and before that the Old Workhouse.

== Demographics ==
Smithdown Road, a long-established student quarter, is home to a large percentage of Liverpool's 55,000-plus university student population (alongside the city centre and Kensington). The upper part of the street separates Toxteth (L8) and Wavertree (L15), two of Liverpool's most ethnically diverse districts; Smithdown Road itself is the hub of Merseyside's Afro-Caribbean community. The area surrounding Smithdown Road is also home to a sizeable South Asian population, with a number of mosques and gurdwaras being located in the area.

== Commerce ==
Both sides of the entire length of Smithdown Road (approximately 1.7 miles) are populated by commercial buildings, such as shops, supermarkets, restaurants and bars. Hattons Model Railways was founded here in 1946 taking up residence in several buildings for 70 years before relocating to Widnes in 2016. In the 1960s, '70s and '80s it was residence to a small but vibrant craft trade consisting of tailors, watchmakers, wrought iron workers and even leather-smiths. The area saw huge decline in the 1980s as privatisation affected various areas of the UK and globalisation meant the migration of Britain's crafts and manufacturing to Asian countries such as India, China and Indonesia. Smithdown Road was one of the central areas where the 1981 Toxteth Riots occurred due to increasing poverty and the tensions between the multicultural communities in the area and the local police force. The troubles that afflicted the area meant a lot of shop owners moved out of the area and it has taken considerable time to re-establish the area.

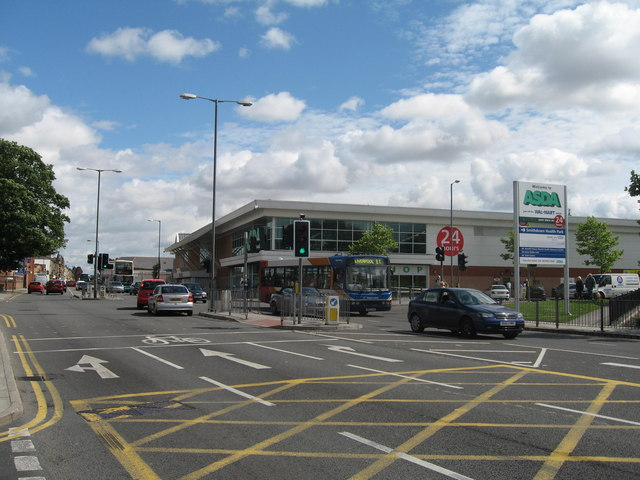
The large Asda store on Smithdown Road

The road was also known for "The Smithdown Ten" pub crawl, particularly by the large student population that lived in the area, or used the road to journey into the centre from student halls further out. As there were more than ten pubs on the road, the specific ten venues chosen for a crawl could vary. In recent years commercial changes have reduced the number of pubs on Smithdown Road to far less than ten, resulting in the end of the tradition

The upper part of Smithdown Road provides the official border line between the Liverpool districts of Wavertree (L15) and Toxteth (L8) and these areas have seen tremendous growth, especially since 2008 when Liverpool won the European Capital of Culture award. The lower part of Smithdown Road provide borders between Wavertree (L15) and the Sefton Park (L17) and Mossley Hill (L18) districts of Liverpool.

The road is also home to Belzan, which The Good Food Guide has named as one of Britain's hundred best local restaurants. The Michelin Guide noted its "unassuming location".

== Music ==
Penny Lane junction, the subject of the Beatles song "Penny Lane", is situated at the junction of Smithdown Road, Smithdown Place and Penny Lane. A song called "Smithdown Road" appeared on the second album of Liverpool band Tramp Attack, inspired by the band's experiences of living there after leaving home. Liverpool band The Vernons' 1989 album was entitled Smithdown Road. The Liverpool band The Christians recorded "Greenbank Drive" (junction of Ullet and Smithdown Roads) in 1990. It reached #63 in the UK charts.

It is also home to the annual Smithdown Road Festival, with local bars and cafes hosting almost 200 bands every year.

== Famous births ==
The Smithdown Hospital, later renamed the Sefton General Hospital, was at 126 Smithdown Road.

- Billy Fury
- Julian Lennon
- April Ashley
- Bill Harry
- Peter Sissons
