= Max Muspratt =

British chemist and politician

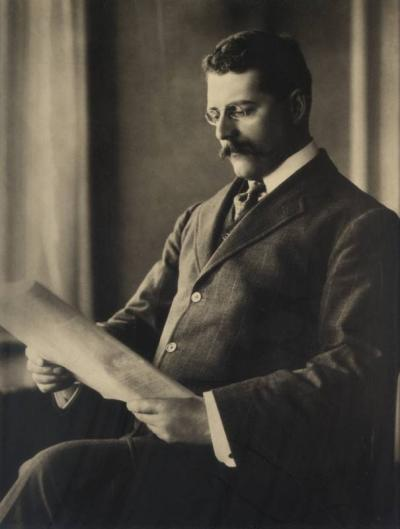
- Max Muspratt in 1917
- Born: 3 February 1872; Seaforth Hall, Liverpool, England
- Died: 20 April 1934 (aged 62); Fulwood Park, Liverpool, England
- Occupations: chemist, businessman, politician
- Relatives: Edmund Knowles Muspratt (father); Frances Jane Baines (mother); Nessie Stewart-Brown (sister); Julia Solly (sister); Nelia Penman (niece); James Muspratt (grandfather)

Sir Max Muspratt, 1st Baronet (3 February 1872 – 20 April 1934) was a British chemist and a politician in the city of Liverpool, England.

== Early life and education ==
He was born at Seaforth Hall, Seaforth, Lancashire, the son of Edmund Knowles Muspratt and his wife Frances Jane Baines. He was one of eight children and a brother of Suffragists Nessie Stewart-Brown and Julia Solly. He was an uncle of Nelia Penman, who served as President of the Women's Liberal Federation. The Muspratt family were originally from Dublin but moved to Liverpool in 1822 when James Muspratt, the father of Edmund, established a chemical factory in Vauxhall Road.

Muspratt was educated at a private school in Hemel Hempstead and at Clifton College before studying industrial chemistry at Zürich Polytechnic.

== United Alkali ==
Muspratt joined the United Alkali Company in 1892 (the firm had been founded by his father), becoming a director in 1901 and its chairman from 1914. In 1926 the United Alkali Company merged with three other companies to form Imperial Chemical Industries (ICI) and Muspratt was a director from its founding until his death in 1934. He was also a director of the International Automatic Telephone Company. He was a member of the Society of Chemical Industry from 1894, becoming its Vice–President from 1904 to 1906 and again from 1921 to 1924. From 1924 he was chairman of the Association of British Chemical Manufacturers and from 1926 to 1927 president of the Federation of British Industries.

== Political career ==
Muspratt was a Liberal and served on the Liverpool City Council from 1904. At the January 1910 general election he was returned to the House of Commons as Member of Parliament (MP) for Liverpool Exchange, but was not re-elected at the December 1910 general election, and was defeated in the 1911 Bootle by-election. He left the Liberals for the Conservative Party in 1926.

During the First World War, Muspratt served as Lord Mayor of Liverpool from 1916 to 1917. He advised the Ministry of Munitions about industrial chemical matters, particularly in the supply of sulphuric acid. and worked in the Trench Warfare Department.

== Personal life ==
In 1896, Muspratt married Helena Agnes Dalrymple Ainsworth of Blackburn, Lancashire. They had two sons, one of whom died in childhood, and two daughters. His surviving son, Rudolph, pre–deceased him in 1929. Rudolph had fathered two twin boys who died in infancy.

He was created a baronet in 1922, of Merseyside, Lancashire, in the 1922 Dissolution Honours.

He died on 20 April 1934, the day after undergoing an operation for "internal trouble." The baronetcy became extinct on his death.

== Notes ==
Parliament of the United Kingdom
Preceded by Richard Cherry	Member of Parliament for Liverpool Exchange; January 1910–December 1910	Succeeded by Leslie Scott
Baronetage of the United Kingdom
New creation	Baronet (of Merseyside, Lancashire); 1922–1934	Extinct
