= Frederick Noel Ashcroft =

British mineral collector and scientific photographer

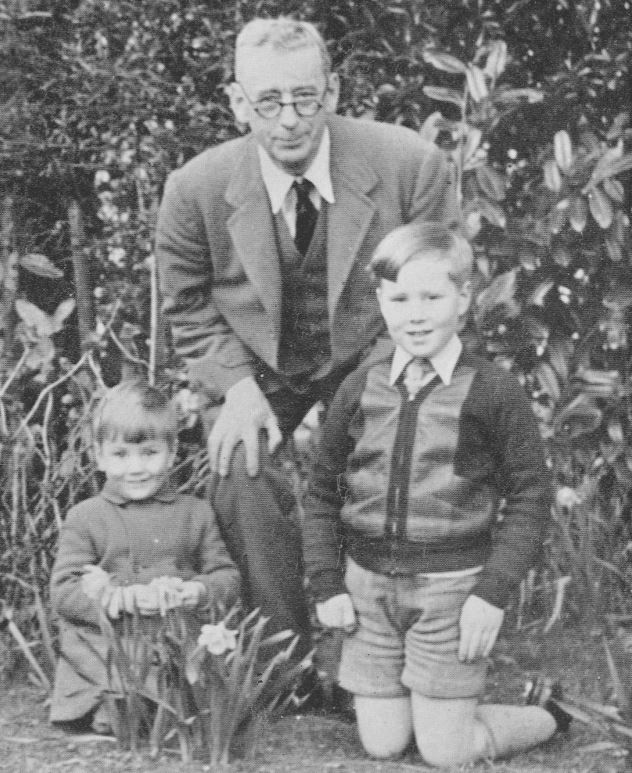
Frederick Noel Ashcroft um 1920

Frederick Noel Ashcroft (1878–1949) was a British mineral collector and scientific photographer whose extensive collections from the period 1914-1938 are held by the Natural History Museum, London.

== Early life ==
Frederick Noel Ashcroft was born at Wavertree, Liverpool in 1878 to parents of German descent. He entered Rugby School in 1892 and proceeded to Magdalen College, Oxford in 1897 where he secured a first class degree in chemistry in 1901. He then carried out research work in organic Chemistry at University College, London in the Department of Organic Chemistry. At Oxford he had also studied mineralogy under Henry Alexander Miers, from whom he acquired an interest in minerals which decided the main line of his future work. Ill health prevented him from undertaking any full time paid work.

== Mineral collecting and scientific photography ==
As a mineralogist Ashcroft first specialised in zeolites between 1901 and the outbreak of World War I. During this period he assembled a collection of about 2000 specimens from 80 localities chiefly in Europe and America. This collection he passed to the British Museum (Natural History) in 1914. His second sphere of interest before World War I was Ireland where he gathered a collection of zeolites from some 90 localities particularly in County Antrim. This collection was passed to the British Museum (Natural History) under the terms of his will on his death in 1949.

After the end of World War 1 Ashcroft turned his interest to Switzerland making annual visits. He came to know all the leading mineralogists there and the local mineral collectors. From the collectors, many of them alpine guides, he purchased great numbers of fine specimens, but it was a condition he made that for every specimen he must be able to locate the exact locality and, if possible, to see and examine each locality himself. He would photograph the sites, and prints of his photographs would then be used to pinpoint the sites of his finds. For this work he used a half plate stand camera with a heavy tripod stand. He considered that a lighter camera producing smaller negatives did not give suitable reproductions for his purposes.

The whole of the Swiss Collection of over 6000 specimens was presented to the British Museum (Natural History) between 1921 and 1938 and the catalogues and the negatives of all his photographs connected with the collection were also passed to the museum under the terms of his will.

"The value of his contributions to the British Museum's national collections of minerals is not to be measured by number of specimens but the total is close on 10,000. Ashcroft's gifts to the Museum far exceed those of any other single benefactor of the Department of Mineralogy".

== Societies and Committee work ==
Ashcroft was a prominent member of the Royal Mineralogical Society acting as honorary treasurer for twenty years and president from 1942 – 1945. He was also a prominent member of the Geological Society of London acting as honorary treasurer from 1929 to 1947. He also acted as Treasurer of the 18th session of the International Geological Congress held in London in August 1948.

== Personal life ==
Ashcroft was married in 1904 to Muriel, the daughter of John Conrad Im Thurn. She was the niece of Everard im Thurn. They had two daughters and two sons; his younger son Michael Ashcroft was a codebreaker at Bletchley Park during World War II working in Hut 8 under Alan Turing.

Ashcroft also created a small but extremely choice collection of jade and Chinese pottery.
