= Wavertree Playground =

Public playground in Liverpool, UK

Coordinates: 53.3947°N 2.9211°W

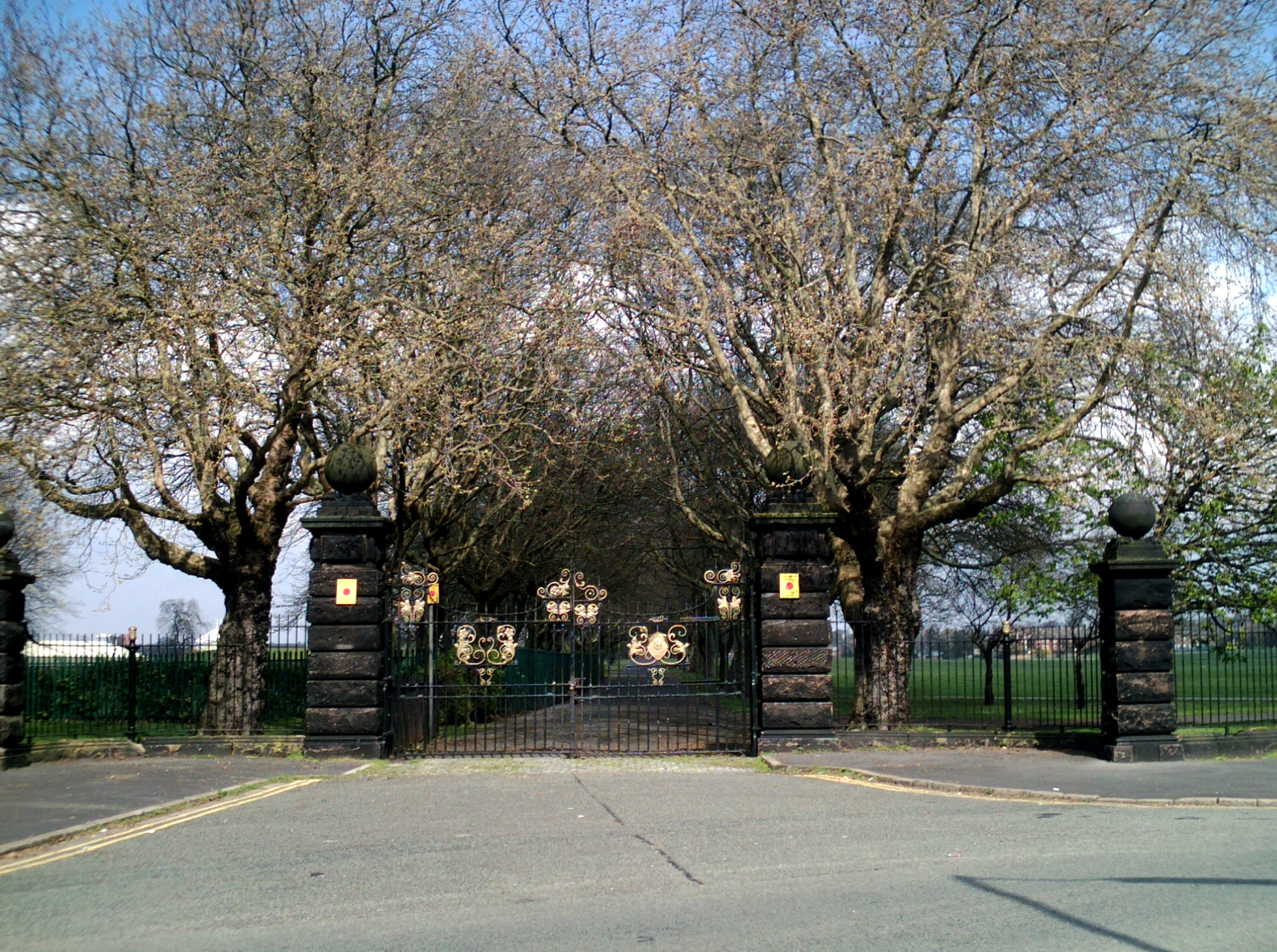
- Type: Public park
- Location: Wavertree, Liverpool
- Area: 104 acres (0.42 km^{2})
- Website: liverpool.gov.uk/parks-and-greenspaces/local-parks-and-greenspaces/wavertree-playground-the-mystery/

Wavertree Playground, known locally as The Mystery, is a public park and playground in the Wavertree area of Liverpool, England. It was one of the first purpose-built public playgrounds in the United Kingdom.

== History ==
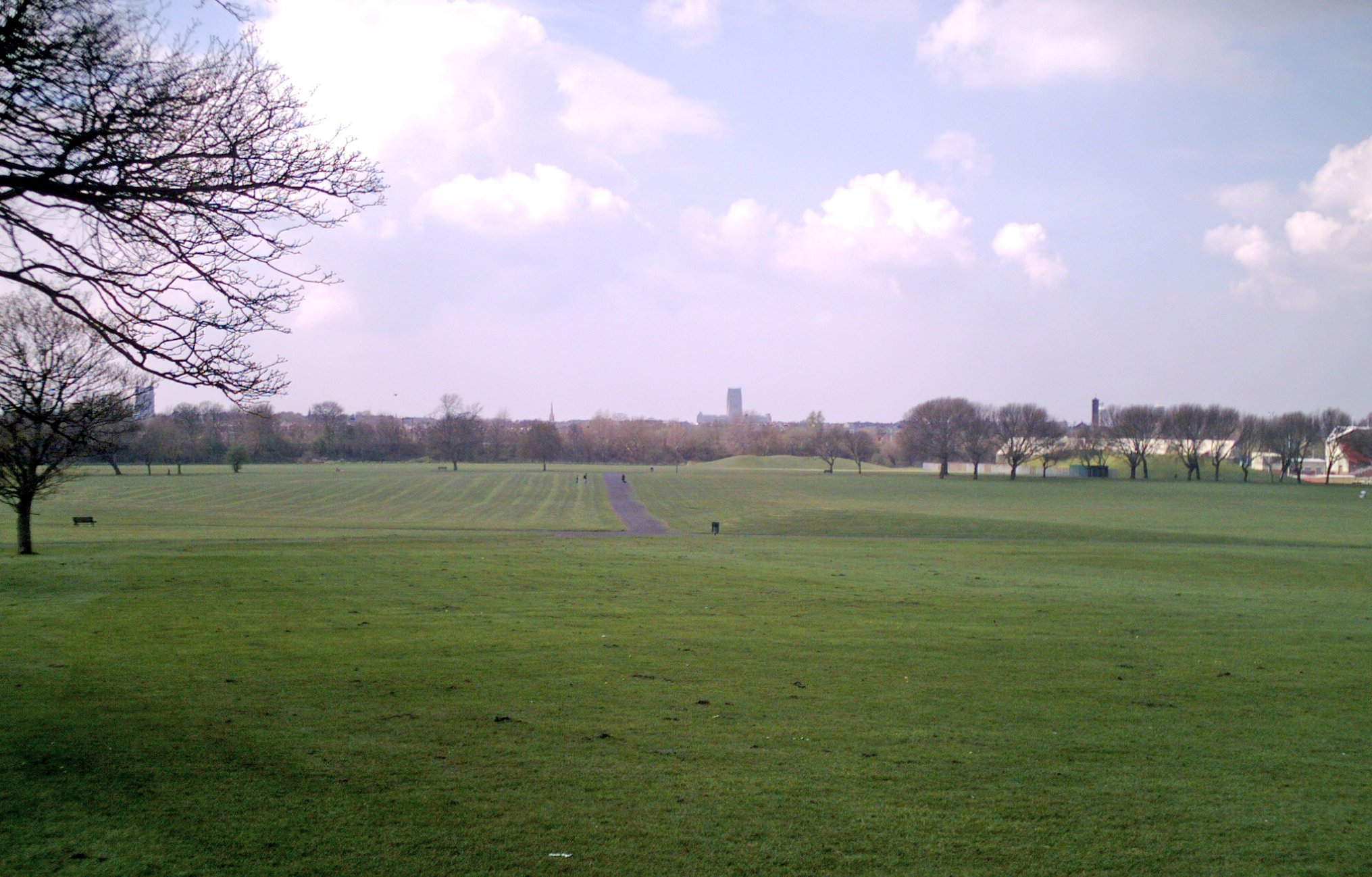
View across Wavertree Playground towards the Anglican Cathedral

In May 1895, a stately home called the Grange was demolished and it looked inevitable that the estate on which it was based would be used as building for the increasing suburbs of Liverpool. However, the estate and some of the surrounding properties, comprising 104 acres (0.42 km^{2}) of land, were purchased by an anonymous donor and presented to the City of Liverpool for use as a park. At the donor's suggestion, the new park was named Wavertree Playground, but was quickly nicknamed "The Mystery" by locals due to the anonymous nature of the donor. The donor was later discovered to be Philip H. Holt whose family also owned Sudley House. An estimated 60,000 people attended the official opening on 7 September 1895, which involved a march past of schoolchildren, a gymnastics exhibition, Morris dancing, and a fireworks display.

A Liverpool Corporation day nursery had a building on the site on Grant Avenue but this was demolished about 1990.

== Features and events ==
In addition to the playground, the park is home to Wavertree Sports Park with many sports facilities including Liverpool Aquatics Centre, sports hall, Lifestyles Fitness Centre, Liverpool Tennis Centre, all-weather pitch, bowling green and athletic track with grandstand. Liverpool Harriers and Athletic Club have based their headquarters at this centre since 1990.

Since May 2019, the park has been the location for the "Mystery Junior Parkrun". This is a free, weekly, timed 2-kilometre running event for people aged 4 to 14. It takes place every Sunday at 9:00 a.m.

== Cultural references ==
The Mystery inspired the title of Hushtones' second album Wildflowers in the Mystery. The members of the Liverpool-based band had all grown up locally.

== See also ==
- Wavertree
- Liverpool Wavertree (UK Parliament constituency)
