= Richard Muspratt =

- Born: 13 August 1822; Liverpool, England
- Died: 18 August 1885 (aged 63)
- Citizenship: English
- Education: University of Giessen
- Known for: Alkali manufacture
- Scientific career
- Fields: Chemist
- Doctoral advisor: Justus von Liebig

Notes
- The second son of James Muspratt

Richard Muspratt (13 August 1822 – 18 August 1885) was a chemical industrialist.

Richard Muspratt was born in Dublin, Ireland, the second son of James Muspratt and his wife Julia Josephine née Connor. His father was also a chemical industrialist who had established factories in Liverpool, St Helens and Newton-le-Willows. Richard was sent by his father to study chemistry under Justus von Liebig at the University of Giessen in Hesse-Darmstadt, Germany.

In 1852 with financial support from his father he set up an alkali manufacturing factory in Flint, North Wales, in partnership with John Kingsby Huntley and set up a permanent home there.

In 1843 he married Jane Moon from Manchester. They had three sons and a daughter. Muspratt took an interest in local politics, was a J.P. and in 1857 was elected mayor of Flint. In all he was mayor 9 times and in 1877 his wife presented a chain of office to the town.

He died on 18 August 1885, at the age of 63. Richard is buried at Northop Road Cemetery, Flint, North Wales.
