= Frederic Muspratt =

Frederic Muspratt (2 February 1825 – November 1872) was a chemist and industrialist who established a chemical factory in Widnes, Lancashire, England.

He was born in Liverpool, the third son of James Muspratt and his wife Julia Josephine née Connor. His father was also a chemical industrialist who had established factories in Liverpool, St Helens and Newton-le-Willows. Richard was sent by his father to study chemistry under Justus von Liebig at the University of Giessen in Hesse-Darmstadt, Germany.

In 1852 with financial support from his father he set up a factory in Wood End, Widnes, manufacturing alkali by the Leblanc process. Frederic was frequently absent from the factory and in 1867 its management was taken over by his father until this was passed to Frederic's younger brother, Edmund.
