= Seaforth, Merseyside =

District of Sefton, Merseyside, England

Coordinates: 53.4678°N 3.0111°W

Seaforth
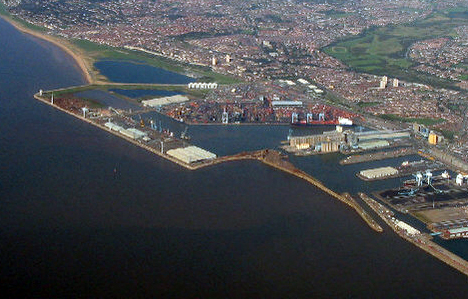
- An aerial photograph of Seaforth Dock

- Location within Merseyside
- OS grid reference: SJ325971
- Metropolitan borough: Sefton
- Metropolitan county: Merseyside
- Region: North West
- Country: England
- Sovereign state: United Kingdom
- Post town: LIVERPOOL
- Postcode district: L21
- Dialling code: 0151
- Police: Merseyside
- Fire: Merseyside
- Ambulance: North West
- UK Parliament: Bootle

Seaforth is a district in the Metropolitan Borough of Sefton, Merseyside, England. Historically in Lancashire, it is north of Liverpool, between Bootle and Waterloo.

== History ==
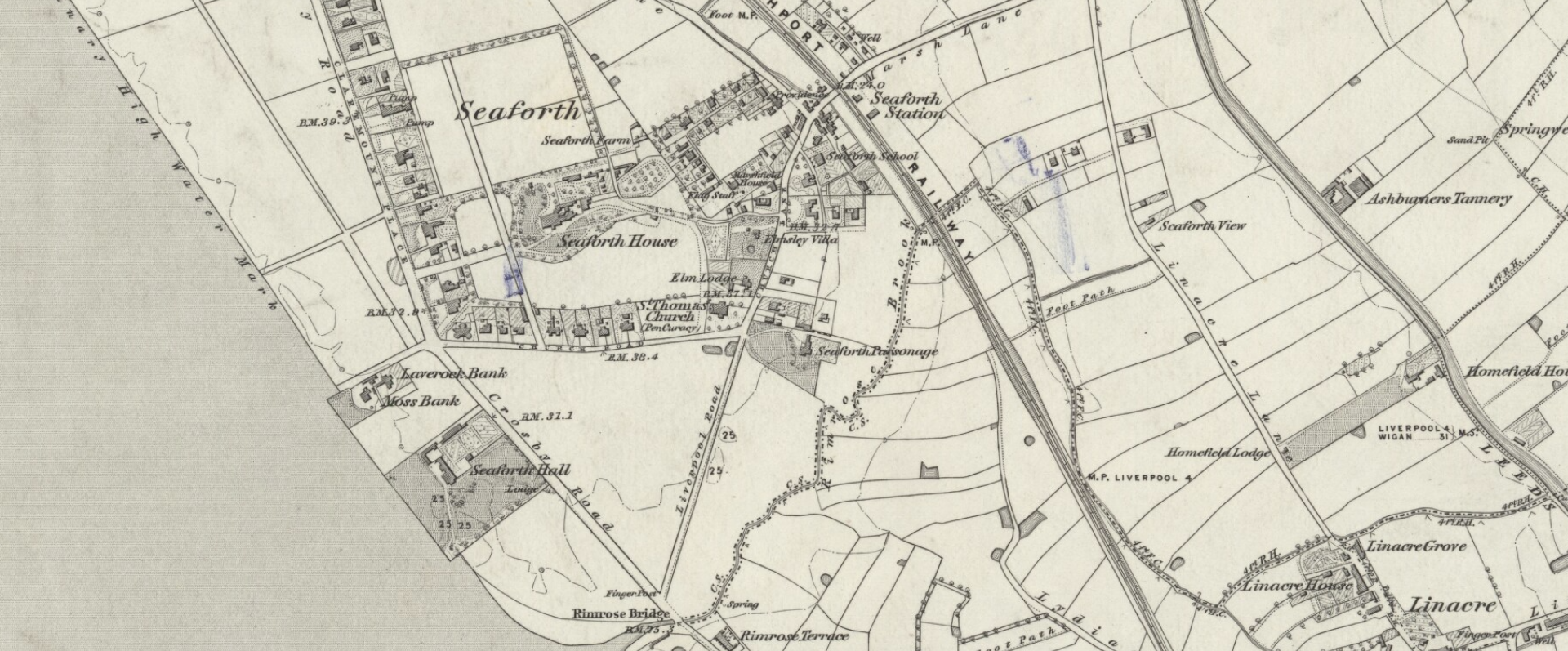
The village of Seaforth, Lancashire in 1850.

The name of Seaforth is thought to come from the Old Norse sæ-fjord, sæ-ford, "sea inlet". It was recorded as Safforde "sea ford" in 1128, suggesting Old English name origins. Another theory for the name of the area is that it was taken from Seaforth House, named after Francis Mackenzie, 1st Baron Seaforth, who built the mansion in 1813 for his daughter and her husband, Sir John Gladstone, father of William Ewart Gladstone, four times Prime Minister of the United Kingdom.

A permanent military presence was established in the borough with the completion of Seaforth Barracks in 1882.

Seaforth Dock opened in 1972 and is the largest dock facility on the River Mersey. It is part of the Port of Liverpool and Liverpool Freeport.

== Governance ==
On 31 December 1894 became a civil parish, being formed from the part of Litherland parish in Waterloo with Seaforth Urban District, Seaforth joined Crosby Municipal Borough in 1937. In 1951 the parish had a population of 14,435. On 1 April 1974 the parish was abolished and the whole of Crosby became part of the new Metropolitan Borough of Sefton.

From 1918 to 1950 Seaforth was within the Parliamentary constituency known as Waterloo, a safe seat for the Conservative Party, and then until 2010 within the Crosby constituency, whose MP from 1997 to 2010 was Claire Curtis-Thomas, of the Labour Party. Prior to her election the Crosby seat was generally considered a Conservative Party stronghold, like its predecessor seat, with Tory MPs elected at every election, except for the 1981 Crosby by-election, when Shirley Williams of the Social Democratic Party was elected. As a result of boundary revisions for the 2010 general election, the Crosby constituency was abolished and Seaforth was included in the expanded Bootle constituency. The district has been represented by Labour MP Peter Dowd since 2015.

For elections to Sefton Council, Seaforth is within the Church electoral ward and is represented by three councillors, two from the Labour Party and one from the Green Party.

== Geography ==
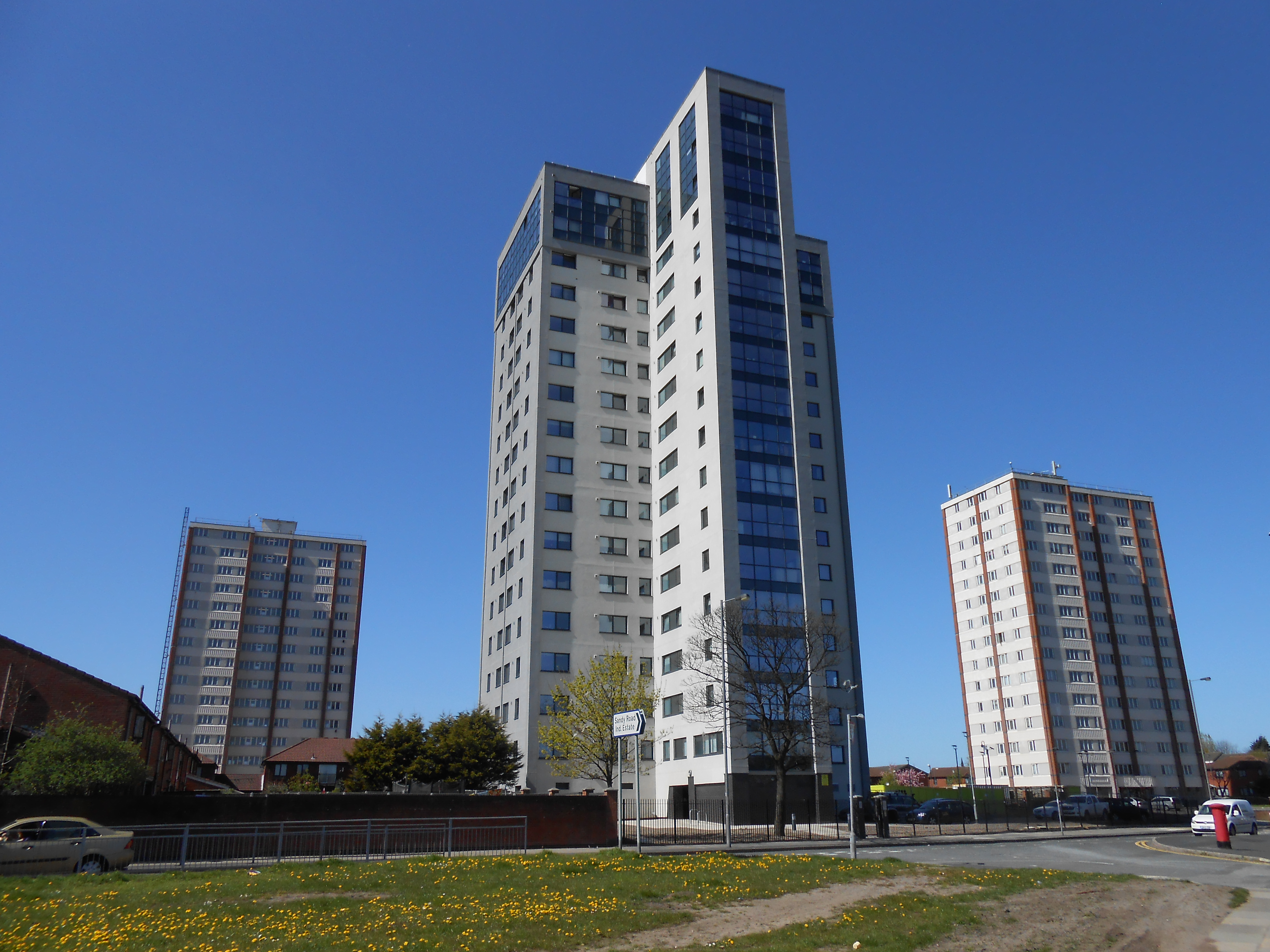
Montgomery House, Alexander House and Churchill House. In April 2016 Churchill House and Montgomery House were demolished. The demolition of Montgomery House failed causing the area to be evacuated.

Seaforth is between Waterloo in the north, Litherland to the east, Bootle to the south, and the River Mersey and the Port of Liverpool to the west. It is mainly an area of Victorian terraced housing.

== Transport ==
Seaforth is served by Seaforth and Litherland railway station on the Liverpool to Southport branch of Merseyrail's Northern Line. Principal roads include the A565 and the A5036.

- Train times and station information for Seaforth, Merseyside from National Rail.

== Sport ==
Motorcycle speedway racing was staged at Seaforth Stadium in the late 1930s. Greyhound racing also took place until the 1960s

== See also ==
- Listed buildings in Great Crosby
- Seaforth Battery

== Notable people ==
- Roger Aindow, English former professional footballer
- Kenny Everett, radio presenter and comedian, born in Seaforth
- William Ewart Gladstone, prime minister
- Edmund Knowles Muspratt (1833—1923), chemical industrialist
- Max Muspratt (1872–1934), chemist & politician
- Julia Solly (1862–1953), British-born South-African feminist
- Nessie Stewart-Brown (1864–1958), feminist
- John Murphy, Film composer
