= Wavertree =

District of Liverpool, in Merseyside, England

Coordinates: 53.398°N 2.9337°W

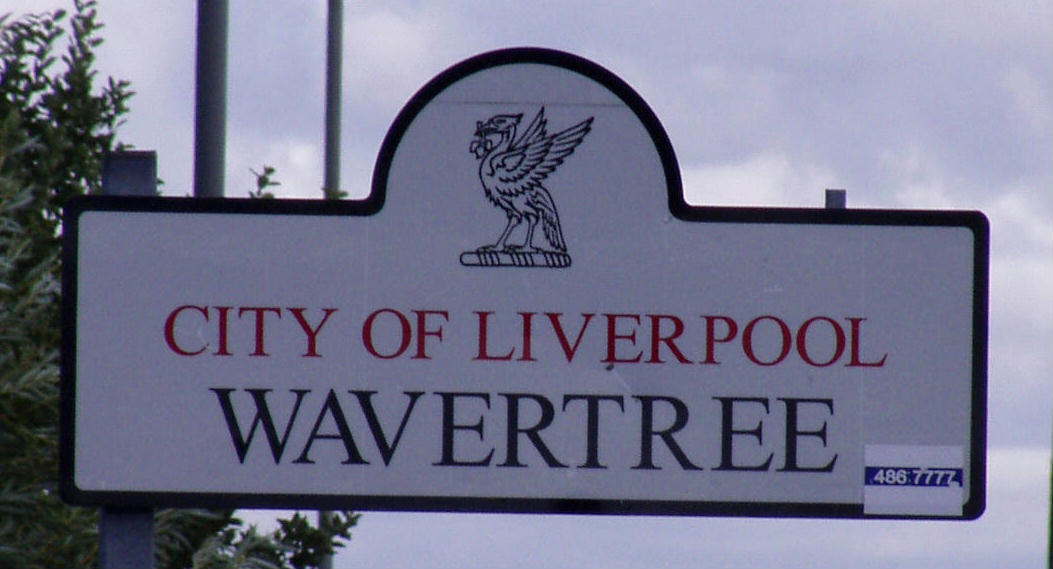

- Location within Merseyside
- Population: 14,772 (2011)
- OS grid reference: SJ3889
- Metropolitan borough: Liverpool
- Metropolitan county: Merseyside
- Region: North West
- Country: England
- Sovereign state: United Kingdom
- Post town: LIVERPOOL
- Postcode district: L15
- Dialling code: 0151
- Police: Merseyside
- Fire: Merseyside
- Ambulance: North West
- UK Parliament: Liverpool Wavertree

Wavertree is a district and suburb of Liverpool, in the county of Merseyside, England. It is a ward of Liverpool City Council and its population at the 2011 census was 14,772. Located to the south and east of the city centre, it is bordered by various districts and suburbs such as Allerton, Edge Hill, Fairfield, Mossley Hill, Old Swan and Toxteth.

== Toponymy ==
Within the boundaries of the historic county of Lancashire, the name derives from the Old English words wæfre and treow, meaning "wavering tree", possibly in reference to aspen trees common locally. It has also been variously described as "a clearing in a wood" or "the place by the common pond". In the past, the name has been spelt Watry, Wartre, Waurtree, Wavertre and Wavertree.

== History ==
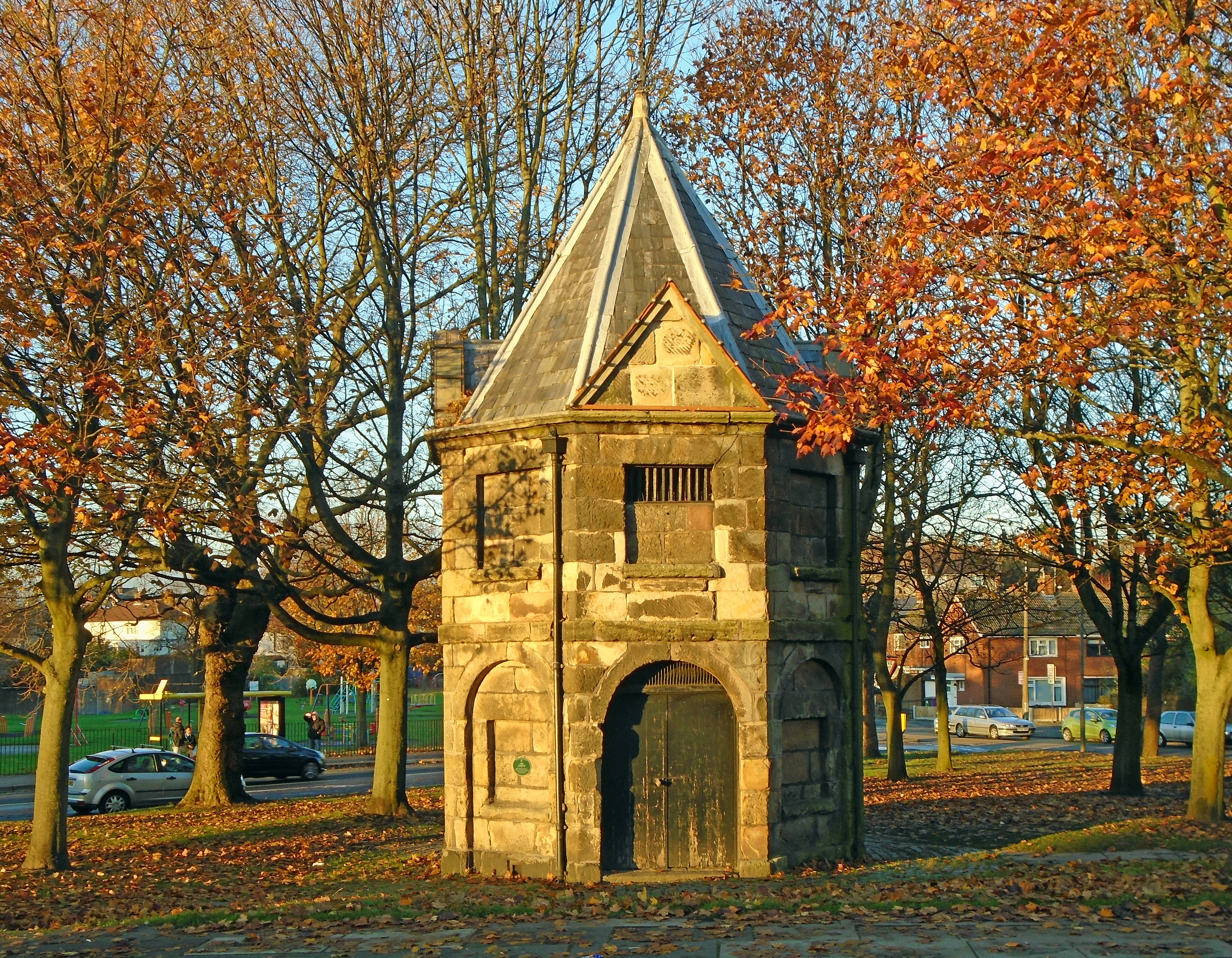
Wavertree Lock-up

The earliest settlement of Wavertree is attested to by the discovery of Bronze Age burial urns in Victoria Park in the mid-1860s, while digging the footings for houses; two of these were built for Patrick O'Connor, patentee, ironmonger, merchant and chair to the Wavertree Local Board of Health.

The Domesday Book of 1086 states: "Leving held Wauretreu. There are two carucates of land. It was worth 64 pence." Wavertree was formerly a township in the parish of Childwall in the West Derby Hundred. In 1866, Wavertree became a separate civil parish, from 1894 to 1895 Wavertree was an urban district and on 1 April 1922, the parish was abolished and merged with Liverpool. In 1921, the parish had a population of 45,991.

Wavertree also boasts a village lock-up, commonly known as The Roundhouse, despite being octagonal in shape. Built in 1796, and later modified by prominent local resident and architect Sir James Picton, it was once used to detain local drunks. The lock-up was made a listed building in 1952.

A similar structure, Everton Lock-Up, sometimes called Prince Rupert's Tower, survives in Everton. The village green, on which Wavertree's lock-up was built, is officially the only surviving piece of common land in Liverpool.

In 1895, the village of Wavertree was incorporated into the city of Liverpool. Buildings of interest include Holy Trinity Church, Liverpool Reform Synagogue, the Blue Coat School and the Royal School for the Blind; all of these are situated on the same road. King David High School, a Jewish-affiliated school that also accepts students of other faiths and backgrounds, is situated in Wavertree and has a primary school attached to it.

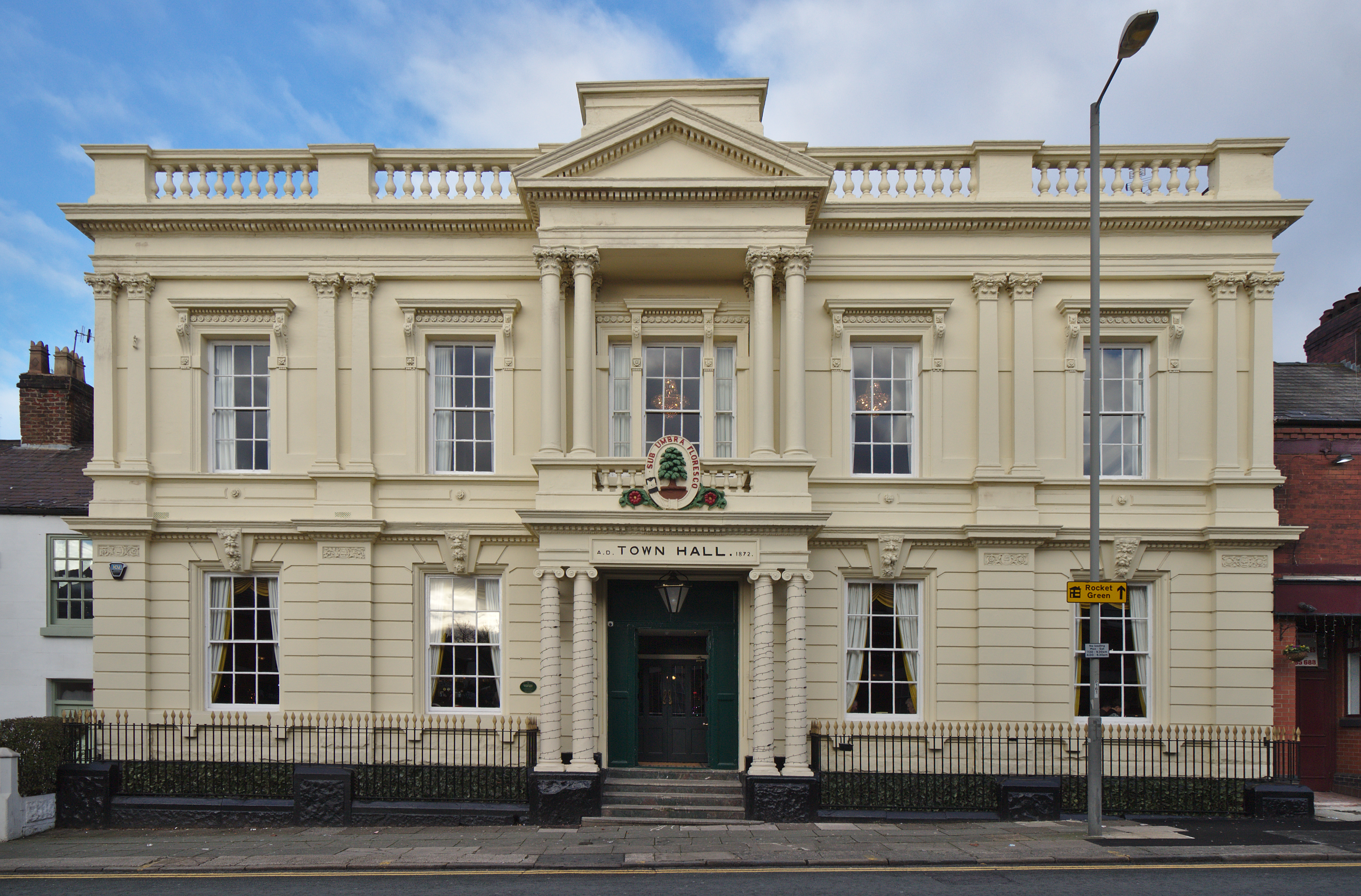
Wavertree Town Hall, now used as a pub

Wavertree Town Hall was built in 1872 as the headquarters of the Wavertree Local Board of Health. Rescued from demolition in 1979, the town hall is now a bar and restaurant.

Wavertree is one of the areas in south Liverpool populated by students of Liverpool's three universities, especially the Smithdown Road area. This road is known for "The Smithdown Ten" pub crawl, although the number of pubs in business varies from year to year. Wavertree is also home to the annual Smithdown Road Festival, with local bars and cafes hosting almost 200 bands every year. The community is ethnically diverse, with significant South Asian and black populations.

== Governance ==
The area is represented in the parliamentary constituency of Liverpool Wavertree by Labour's Paula Barker MP since 2019.

There are two Liverpool City Council seats in the district:

- Wavertree Garden Suburb represented by Labour's Julie Fadden
- Wavertree Village represented by Laurence Sidorczuk of the Liberal Democrats.

== Education ==
There are several primary and secondary schools in this densely populated area of Liverpool. In addition to the aforementioned Blue Coat School, Royal School for the Blind and King David High School, there is also Wavertree Church of England School, which was renamed from Trinity District in the 1990s; it celebrated its 150th birthday in September 2017.

There is another primary school on South Drive called Our Lady of Good Help, which used to be located in Chestnut Grove next to our Lady's Roman Catholic Church, which is now facing redevelopment. St Clare's Roman Catholic Primary School is also situated off Smithdown Road.

== Transport ==
The area has two railway stations, with services provided by Northern Trains:

- Edge Hill has regular services to Liverpool Lime Street, Wigan North Western, Manchester Piccadilly and Manchester Airport
- Wavertree Technology Park lies one station to the east of Edge Hill, with similar service pattern.

Wavertree has regular bus services operated by Arriva Merseyside and Stagecoach Merseyside and South Lancashire; services connect the area with Liverpool city centre, Allerton, Birkenhead, Bootle, Halewood, Speke and John Lennon Airport.

== Wavertree Playground ("The Mystery") ==
Wavertree Playground, known locally as "The Mystery", was one of the first purpose-built public playgrounds in the UK. Opened in 1895, it is based on land donated to Liverpool Corporation by an anonymous donor (hence its nickname) to be a venue for organised sport and a place for children from the city's schools to run about in, not a park for "promenading" in the Victorian tradition. The donor expressed the hope that the city council "might approve of giving it a fair trial for this purpose...before appropriating it for any other use."

The land is currently home to Wavertree Athletics Centre, which boasts many sports facilities including tennis courts, an all-weather pitch, a bowling green and an athletic track with grandstand. It also houses Liverpool Aquatics Centre, with two swimming pools, a sports hall and a lifestyle fitness centre. The athletics centre has produced Olympic athletes such as Katarina Johnson-Thompson, who trains with the Liverpool Harriers team that has made its headquarters at the centre since 1990.

== Notable people ==
- Frederick Noel Ashcroft, mineral collector and photographer
- Ross Barkley, footballer
- Tony Bellew, boxer
- Joan Benesh, choreographer and dancer
- Augustine Birrell, barrister, politician and writer
- Percy Brookfield, unionist and politician
- Kim Cattrall, actor
- Kenneth Cope, actor
- Paul Dawber, actor
- Paul Draper, musician
- Georgia May Foote, actor
- Cyril Edward Gourley, soldier
- John Gregson, actor
- Chelcee Grimes, singer-songwriter
- George Harrison, musician
- Stewart Duckworth Headlam, priest
- Raymond Davies Hughes, broadcaster of pro-Nazi propaganda in Welsh
- Holly Johnson, singer
- Bill Kenwright, theatre director
- John Lennon, musician
- Norman Rossington, actor
- Leonard Rossiter, actor
- Bertram Peel, cricketer
- Denis Peel, cricketer
- Jimmy Tarbuck, comedian
- James Valiant, cricketer
- Dora Yates, linguist, Romani scholar, who lived in Marmion Road.
