= Edmund Knowles Muspratt =

English chemical industrialist

- Born: 6 November 1833; Seaforth, Liverpool, England
- Died: 1 September 1923 (aged 89); Seaforth, England
- Citizenship: English
- Education: University of Giessen; Ludwig-Maximilians-Universität München
- Known for: Alkali manufacture; separating metals
- Scientific career
- Fields: Chemist, metallurgist
- Workplaces: Wood End, Widnes, Lancashire; United Alkali Company
- Doctoral advisor: Justus von Liebig

Notes
- Youngest son of James Muspratt

Edmund Knowles Muspratt (6 November 1833 – 1 September 1923) was an English chemical industrialist.

== Early life and background ==
Edmund Knowles Muspratt was born in Seaforth, near Liverpool, England, the fourth and youngest son of James Muspratt and his wife Julia Josephine née Connor. His father was also a chemical industrialist who had established factories in Liverpool, St Helens and Newton-le-Willows. He was educated at the Pestalozzian Institute at Worksop, Nottinghamshire. He was then sent by his father to study chemistry under Justus von Liebig at the University of Giessen in Hesse-Darmstadt, Germany. When Liebig moved to the Ludwig-Maximilians-Universität München in 1852, Muspratt went with him and studied medicine there where he gained the degree of PhD He then returned to Liverpool to work with his father in his businesses. He married Frances Jane Baines, and together they had eight children, including Suffragists, Nessie Stewart-Brown, Julia Solly and Liberal MP, Max Muspratt.

== Business career ==
Edmund took over the management of the Wood End factory in Widnes, Lancashire, from his older brother Frederic and also became involved in the management of his father's Liverpool factory. These factories manufactured alkali by the Leblanc process. During this time Edmund studied metallurgy at Owens College, Manchester and invented methods of separating nickel, cobalt and copper from the waste by–products from his factories. He also operated a plant at Wood End to recover sulphur by the process invented by Ludwig Mond. In 1867 the Widnes Metal Company was formed with Muspratt as its chairman with the purpose of recovering metals, particularly copper and silver, from the burnt pyrites used for alkali manufacture.

In 1860, when the governments of Britain and France formed a treaty to raise duties on materials made from salt, Muspratt was prominent in the establishment of an alkali manufacturers' association. Muspratt and Holbrook Gaskell went together to Paris to negotiate terms for the manufacturers. The association was more formally established two years later to deal with problems arising from pollution. In 1876, Muspratt was a witness giving evidence to the Royal Commission enquiring into the pollution caused by the Widnes factories. In 1890, many of the businesses using the Leblanc process combined to form the United Alkali Company to resist competition from factories making alkali by the ammonia–soda process. Muspratt became a director and later the president of this company.

== Politics and personal life ==
Muspratt became interested in politics, being influenced by the writings of John Stuart Mill and was a believer in free trade. He was an active member of the Financial Reform Association which continued the policy of the Anti-Corn Law League. In 1885, when Widnes became a parliamentary constituency, he offered himself as a Liberal candidate but was defeated.

He was a member of Liverpool town council and Lancashire County Council, and chairman of Liverpool chamber of commerce. In 1881, he played a part in founding University College, Liverpool. When this became the University of Liverpool in 1903 he was elected the President of its Council. He was given the honorary degree of LLD by the university in 1907. In 1878 he became a Fellow of the Institute of Chemistry. He was a member of the Society of Chemical Industry, being its Vice–President from 1881 to 1885, 1886 to 1889 and 1893 to 1895, and its President from 1885 to 1886. In 1910, he helped to establish the Liverpool repertory theatre. He wrote an autobiography which was published in 1917 entitled My Life and Work. He died in 1923 at Seaforth Hall, the house built by his father.
