= James Sheridan Muspratt =

Irish-born chemist (1821–1871)

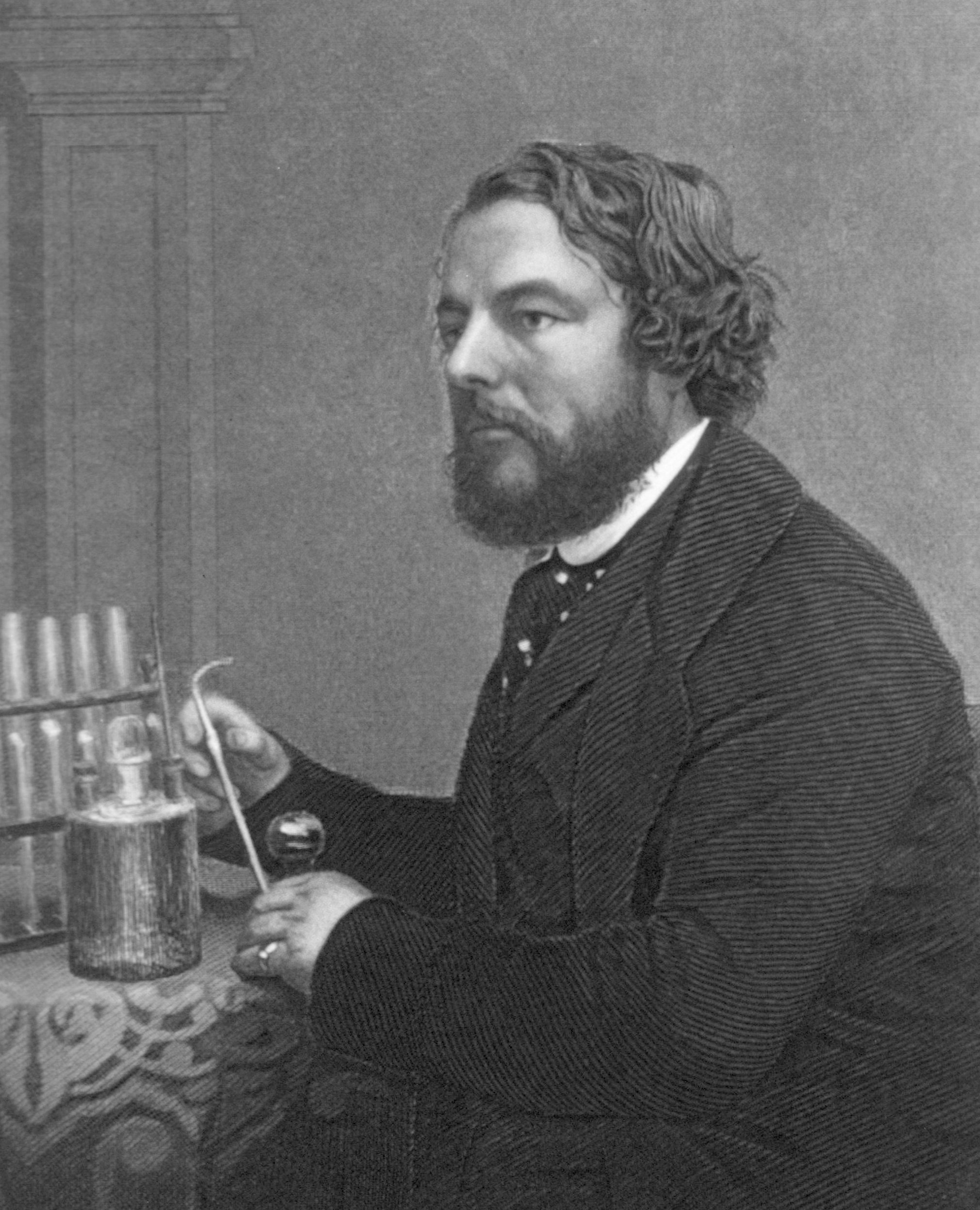
- U.S. National Library of Medicine
- Born: 8 March 1821; Dublin, Ireland
- Died: 3 February 1871 (aged 49)
- Education: University College London
- Known for: Chemistry, Theoretical, Practical and Analytical as applied and relating to the Arts and Manufactures
- Spouse(s): Susan Webb Cushman (1848–1859; her death); 3 children Ann Neal (1860–1871; his death)
- Scientific career
- Fields: Research chemistry

James Sheridan Muspratt FRSE FRSD (8 March 1821 – 3 February 1871) was an Irish-born research chemist and teacher. His most influential publication was his two-volume book Chemistry, Theoretical, Practical and Analytical as applied and relating to the Arts and Manufactures (1857–1860).

== Life ==
James Sheridan Muspratt was born in Dublin and moved to Liverpool with his parents when he was one year old. His father, James Muspratt, was one of the biggest industrial chemicals manufacturers in the UK between 1825 and 1850. James Sheridan Muspratt attended private schools in Bootle, Merseyside, and then went with tutors to travel on the European continent. Beginning in 1836, he studied chemistry under Thomas Graham at Anderson's University in Glasgow and then moved with Graham to University College London.

In 1841, his father sent him to Philadelphia to manage the Muspratt business interests there but these were unsuccessful. Muspratt's father had met and become friends with Justus von Liebig at a meeting of the British Association for the Advancement of Science and James Sheridan was sent to work with von Liebig at the University of Giessen in Germany where he gained a PhD in 1845.

James Sheridan Muspratt's own cited original research work includes a report on the sulphites (1845) and, with August Wilhelm von Hofmann, on the preparation of toluidine and nitraniline (1845–1846).

In 1848, Muspratt founded the Liverpool College of Chemistry in a disused stable at the back of his house in Canning Street, Liverpool. Upon his father's retirement in 1857, he became a partner along with his brothers in his father's chemicals manufacturing business. But it was also in the late 1850s that he wrote the textbook Chemistry, Theoretical, Practical and Analytical as applied and relating to the Arts and Manufactures. The German translation of this book by Friedrich Stohmann was widely read in Germany, which was the leading nation in the field at the time. Muspratt also published translation into English of some German-language chemistry.

== Family ==
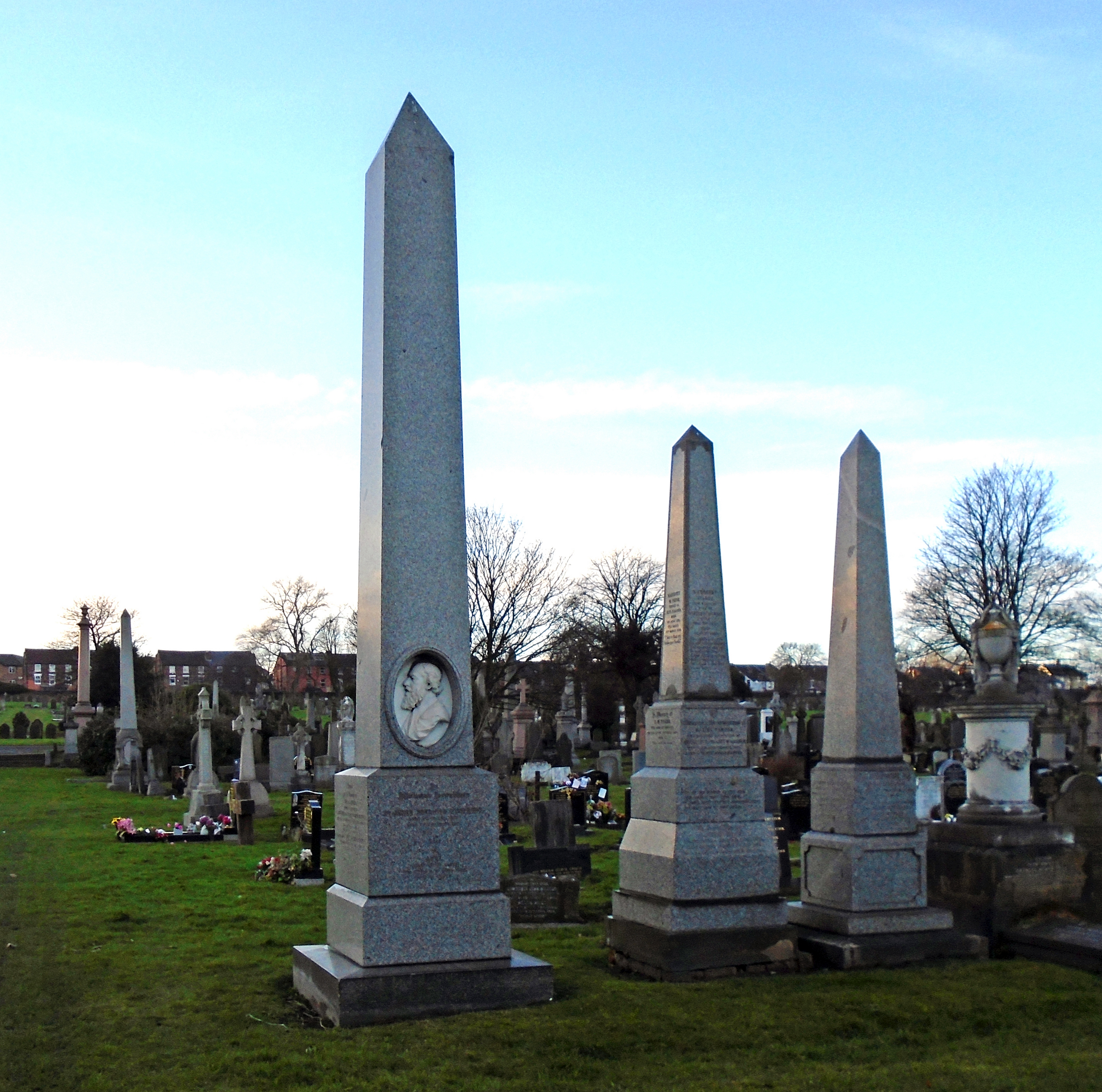
Memorial in Toxteth Park Cemetery

Muspratt took an interest in theatre and helped to organise a visit to Liverpool of Charles Dickens's amateur company in 1847. Among the cast were the American actress Susan Webb Cushman. Muspratt married Susan in 1848 and they had three daughters. Susan died in 1859 and Muspratt remarried, to Ann Neal of Rainhill the following year. They had no children and Muspratt died at his home in West Derby, Liverpool in 1871.
