= 1927 Liverpool City Council election =

1927 English local government election

← 1926	1 November 1927	1928 →

39 councillors' seats were up for election

Elections to Liverpool City Council were held on 1 November 1927.

One third of the council seats were up for election. The term of office for each councillor being three years.

Two of the thirty-nine seats up for election were uncontested.

After the election, the composition of the council was:

Party	Councillors	±	Aldermen	Total
Conservative	64	-4	28	92
Labour	24	+6	1	25
Catholic	16	0	5	21
Liberal	8	0	4	12
Protestant	1	-1	0	`1
Independent	1	-1	0	1

== Election result ==
Liverpool local election result 1927
Party	Seats	Gains	Losses	Net gain/loss	Seats %	Votes %	Votes	+/−
Conservative	20	2	6	-4	51%			
Labour	13	7	1	+6	33%			
Catholic	3	1	1	0	8%			
Liberal	3	1	1	0	3%			
Protestant	0	0	1	-1	0%			
Independent	0	0	1	-1	0%			
Communist	0	0	0	0	0%			

== Ward results ==
* - Councillor seeking re-election

Comparisons are made with the 1924 election results.

=== Abercromby ===
No. 9 Abercromby
Party	Candidate	Votes	%	±%
Conservative	William Thomas Roberts *	2,077	62%	
Labour	Samuel Sydney Silverman	1,274	38%	
Majority		803		
Registered electors		9,218		
Turnout		3,351	36%	
Conservative hold		Swing		

=== Aigburth ===
No. 17 Aigburth
Party	Candidate	Votes	%	±%
Conservative	Edward James Deane *	unopposed		
Registered electors				
Conservative hold		Swing		

=== Allerton ===
No. 35 Allerton
Party	Candidate	Votes	%	±%
Conservative	George Alfred Strong *	837	65%	
Liberal	Neil Norman McKinnon	362	28%	
Labour	Thomas Crossland	84	7%	
Majority		475		
Registered electors		2,872		
Turnout		1,283	45%	
Conservative hold		Swing		

=== Anfield ===
No. 29 Anfield
Party	Candidate	Votes	%	±%
Liberal	Arthur Richard Price	1,952	44%	
Conservative	Charles Gordon Snowden Gordon *	1,639	37%	
Labour	Robert Joseph McDonnell	845	19%	
Majority		794		
Registered electors		10,061		
Turnout		4,436	45%	
Liberal gain from Conservative		Swing		

=== Breckfield ===
No. 30 Breckfield
Party	Candidate	Votes	%	±%
Conservative	Thomas Henry Burton *	2,081	52%	
Labour	William James Riddick	1,947	48%	
Majority		134		
Registered electors		9,697		
Turnout		4,028	42%	
Conservative hold		Swing		

=== Brunswick ===
No. 11 Brunswick
Party	Candidate	Votes	%	±%
Labour	Thomas Hanley	3,431	79%	
Conservative	Thomas Henry Nabb	930	21%	
Majority		2,501		
Registered electors		8,589		
Turnout		4,361	51%	
Labour hold		Swing		

=== Castle Street ===
No. 7 Castle Street
Party	Candidate	Votes	%	±%
Conservative	William Denton *	unopposed		
Registered electors				
Conservative hold		Swing		

=== Childwall ===
No. 38 Childwall 2 seats
Party	Candidate	Votes	%	±%
Conservative	Herbert John Davis *	777	64%	
Conservative	Edward Norman Heath	719	59%	
Labour	Mary Lilian Hamilton	438	36%	
Labour	Charles Matthew Belk	382	31%	
Majority		339		
Registered electors		2,107		
Turnout		1,215	58%	
Conservative hold		Swing		
Conservative hold		Swing		

=== Dingle ===
No. 12 Dingle
Party	Candidate	Votes	%	±%
Conservative	Frank Bennett Brown *	4,092	52%	
Labour	William Jones	3,811	48%	
Majority		281		
Registered electors		14,428		
Turnout		7,903	55%	
Conservative hold		Swing		

=== Edge Hill ===
No. 18 Edge Hill
Party	Candidate	Votes	%	±%
Labour	Robert Tissyman *	3,230	58%	
Conservative	Richard Roberts	2,301	42%	
Majority		929		
Registered electors		12,616		
Turnout		5,531	44%	
Labour hold		Swing		

=== Everton ===
No. 21 Everton
Party	Candidate	Votes	%	±%
Labour	Bertie Kirby *	3,809	68%	
Conservative	Joseph Gardner	1,826	32%	
Majority		1,983	36%	
Registered electors		12,647		
Turnout		5,635	45%	
Labour hold		Swing		

=== Exchange ===
No. 5 Exchange
Party	Candidate	Votes	%	±%
Catholic	John Quinn *	910	85%	
Labour	Joseph Nugent	123	12%	
Majority		787		
Registered electors		2,710		
Turnout		1,033		
Catholic hold		Swing		

=== Fairfield ===
No. 31 Fairfield
Party	Candidate	Votes	%	±%
Liberal	Charles Sydney Jones *	2,475	64%	
Labour	Victor Harold Edgar Baker	1,411	36%	
Majority		1,064	28%	
Registered electors		9,478		
Turnout		3,886	41%	
Liberal hold		Swing		

=== Fazakerley ===
No. 27 Fazakerley
Party	Candidate	Votes	%	±%
Conservative	George Herbert Charters *	1,053	70%	
Labour	Jane Billing Davison	459	30%	
Majority		594		
Registered electors		4,366		
Turnout		1,512	35%	
Conservative hold		Swing		

=== Garston ===
No. 37 Garston
Party	Candidate	Votes	%	±%
Labour	Joseph Jackson Cleary	2,011	50.2%	
Conservative	Edward Wrake Turner *	1,993	49.8%	
Majority		18		
Registered electors		6,400		
Turnout		4,004	63%	
Labour gain from Conservative		Swing		

=== Granby ===
No. 14 Granby
Party	Candidate	Votes	%	±%
Labour	James Johnstone	1,873	44%	
Conservative	Rosa Hoch *	1,361	32%	
Liberal	Arthur Donald Dennis	986	23%	
Majority		512		
Registered electors		9,322		
Turnout		4,220	45%	
Labour gain from Conservative		Swing		

=== Great George ===
No. 10 Great George
Party	Candidate	Votes	%	±%
Labour	John Loughlin	1,265	56%	
Catholic	John Patrick Bligh	810	36%	
Independent Catholic	Thomas Joseph Marner *	125	6%	
People's	William Joseph Doyle	67	3%	
Majority		455		
Registered electors		4,840		
Turnout		2,267	47%	
Labour gain from Catholic		Swing		

=== Kensington ===
No. 19 Kensington
Party	Candidate	Votes	%	±%
Conservative	Ambrose Fry	3,202	55%	
Labour	William Richard Blair	2,634	45%	
Majority		586		
Registered electors		10,846		
Turnout		5,836	54%	
Conservative hold		Swing		

=== Kirkdale ===
No. 24 Kirkdale
Party	Candidate	Votes	%	±%
Labour	Frederick Jones	2,874	50.1%	
Conservative	Charles Porter *	2,868	49.9%	
Majority		6		
Registered electors		15,680		
Turnout		5,742	37%	
Labour gain from Conservative		Swing		

=== Low Hill ===
No. 20 Low Hill
Party	Candidate	Votes	%	±%
Labour	Edward Gerard Deery	2,835	56%	
Conservative	Alfred Gaskell Alsop *	2,229	44%	
Majority		606		
Registered electors		10,305		
Turnout		5,064	49%	
Labour gain from Conservative		Swing		

=== Much Woolton ===
No. 36 Much Woolton
Party	Candidate	Votes	%	±%
Conservative	William Edward Stirling Napier	683	72%	
Labour	Frederick Stapleton	262	28%	
Majority		421		
Registered electors		1,801		
Turnout		945	52%	
Conservative gain from Independent		Swing		

=== Netherfield ===
No. 22 Netherfield
Party	Candidate	Votes	%	±%
Conservative	Alfred Michael Urding *	3,164	50.5%	
Labour	John Bagot	3,102	49.5%	
Majority		62		
Registered electors		11,590		
Turnout		6,266	54%	
Conservative hold		Swing		

=== North Scotland ===
No. 2 North Scotland
Party	Candidate	Votes	%	±%
Labour	David Gilbert Logan *	3,059	59%	
Catholic	James O'Hare	2,098	40%	
Independent Labour	Edward Campbell	30	1%	
Majority		961		
Registered electors		8,214		
Turnout		5,187	63%	
Labour hold		Swing		

=== Old Swan ===
No. 32 Old Swan
Party	Candidate	Votes	%	±%
Conservative	John Parry Thomas *	2,520	55%	
Labour	Sarah Anne McArd	2,072	45%	
Majority		448		
Registered electors		12,949		
Turnout		4,592	35%	
Conservative hold		Swing		

=== Prince's Park ===
No. 13 Prince's Park
Party	Candidate	Votes	%	±%
Conservative	Margaret Beavan *	2,919	64%	
Labour	Robert Edwards	1,621	36%	
Majority		1,298	28%	
Registered electors		9,256		
Turnout		4,540	49%	
Conservative hold		Swing		

=== Sandhills ===
No. 1 Sandhills
Party	Candidate	Votes	%	±%
Labour	John Wolfe Tone Morrissey	2,638	64%	
Catholic	Christopher Maguire	1,492	36%	
Majority		1,146		
Registered electors		8,841		
Turnout		4,130	47%	
Labour hold		Swing		

=== St. Anne's ===
No. 6 St. Anne's
Party	Candidate	Votes	%	±%
Labour	James Sexton *	2,152	56%	
Catholic	Cornelius Devlin	1,666	44%	
Majority		486	12%	
Registered electors		8,525		
Turnout		3,818	45%	
Labour hold		Swing		

=== St. Domingo ===
No. 23 St. Domingo
Party	Candidate	Votes	%	±%
Labour	John Hamilton	2,243	54%	
Protestant	Albert Clayton *	1,948	46%	
Majority		295		
Registered electors		11,101		
Turnout		4,191	38%	
Labour gain from Protestant		Swing		

=== St. Peter's ===
No. 8 St. Peter's
Party	Candidate	Votes	%	±%
Liberal	Burton William Eills *	806	80%	
Independent	Frederick Bowman	198	20%	
Majority		608		
Registered electors		2,885		
Turnout		1,004	35%	
Liberal hold		Swing		

=== Sefton Park East ===
No. 15 Sefton Park East
Party	Candidate	Votes	%	±%
Conservative	George Edward Holme *	1,941	53%	
Liberal	Aled Owen Roberts	1,735	47%	
Majority		206	6%	
Registered electors		8,688		
Turnout		3,675	42%	
Conservative hold		Swing		

=== Sefton Park West ===
No. 16 Sefton Park West
Party	Candidate	Votes	%	±%
Conservative	Mabel Fletcher *	2,093	75%	
Labour	Gertrude Annie Cole	690	25%	
Majority		1,403	50%	
Registered electors		6,025		
Turnout		2,783	46%	
Conservative hold		Swing		

=== South Scotland ===
No. 3 South Scotland
Party	Candidate	Votes	%	±%
Catholic	Mary O'Shea	2,767	59%	
Labour	Joseph Harrington	1,927	41%	
Majority		840		
Registered electors		8,437		
Turnout		4,694	56%	
Catholic gain from Labour		Swing		

=== Vauxhall ===
No. 4 Vauxhall
Party	Candidate	Votes	%	±%
Catholic	Joseph Belger *	1,171	77%	
Labour	Patrick Duffy	349	23%	
Majority		822		
Registered electors		3,723		
Turnout		1,520	41%	
Catholic hold		Swing		

=== Walton ===
No. 25 Walton
Party	Candidate	Votes	%	±%
Conservative	Robert John Hall	2,868	56%	
Labour	Thomas Herbert Pye	2,284	44%	
Majority		584		
Registered electors		15,312		
Turnout		5,152	34%	
Conservative hold		Swing		

=== Warbreck ===
No. 26 Warbreck
Party	Candidate	Votes	%	±%
Conservative	John Hill *	2,494	70%	
Labour	John Fraser	1,094	30%	
Majority		1,400		
Registered electors		11,572		
Turnout		3,588	31%	
Conservative hold		Swing		

=== Wavertree ===
No. 34 Wavertree
Party	Candidate	Votes	%	±%
Conservative	John Morris Griffith *	2,728	62%	
Labour	William Sidney Dytor	1,700	38%	
Majority		1,028		
Registered electors		12,737		
Turnout		4,428	35%	
Conservative gain from Liberal		Swing		

=== Wavertree West ===
No. 33 Wavertree West
Party	Candidate	Votes	%	±%
Labour	Ernest Whiteley	1,856	39%	
Conservative	Charles Henry Barker *	1,589	33%	
Liberal	John Richard Hobhouse	1,313	28%	
Majority		267		
Registered electors		8,402		
Turnout		4,758	57%	
Labour gain from Conservative		Swing		

=== West Derby ===
No. 28 West Derby
Party	Candidate	Votes	%	±%
Conservative	John Hickman Dovener *	3,304	61%	
Labour	George Henry Boothman	2,094	39%	
Majority		1,210		
Registered electors		15,837		
Turnout		5,398	34%	
Conservative hold		Swing		

== By-elections ==
=== No. 16 Sefton Park West, 1 December 1927 ===
Following the death on 17 February 1927 of Alderman Sir John Utting D.L, Councillor Frank Campbell Wilson (Liberal, Sefton Park West, elected unopposed 1 November 1926) was elected as an alderman by the councillors on 5 October 1927.

No. 16 Sefton Park West
Party	Candidate	Votes	%	±%
Conservative	Ronald Percy Clayton	1,955	74%	
Labour	Gertrude Annie Cole	675	26%	
Majority		1,280		
Registered electors		6,025		
Turnout		2,630	44%	
Conservative hold		Swing		

=== No. 18 Edge Hill, 17 September 1928 ===
The resignation of Councillor William Smith (Labour, Edge Hill, elected 1 November 1926) was reported to the council on 5 September 1928.

No. 18 Edge Hill 17 September 1928
Party	Candidate	Votes	%	±%
Labour	Alexander Griffin	3,144	55%	
Conservative	Henry Gladstone Grace	2,368	42%	
Communist	Leo Joseph McGree	172	3%	
Majority		776		
Registered electors		12,616		
Turnout		5,684	45%	
Labour hold		Swing		

== See also ==
- Liverpool City Council
- Liverpool Town Council elections 1835 - 1879
- Liverpool City Council elections 1880–present
- 1926 Liverpool City Council election#Aldermanic Election 5 October 1927
- Mayors and Lord Mayors of Liverpool 1207 to present
- History of local government in England
