= 1929 Liverpool City Council election =

1929 UK local government election

- 1 November 1929

39 councillors' seats plus two by-elections for Croxteth and Much Woolton

Elections to Liverpool City Council were held on 1 November 1929. After the election, the composition of the council was:

Two of the 39 seats were unopposed.

Party	Councillors	±	Aldermen	Total
Conservative	??	??	??	??
Labour	??	??	??	??
Protestant	??	??	??	??
Centre	??	??	??	??
Liberal	??	??	??	??

== Election result ==
Liverpool local election result 1929
Party	Seats	Gains	Losses	Net gain/loss	Seats %	Votes %	Votes	+/−
Conservative	17	0	4	-4		44%	70,037	
Labour	20	8	0	+8		53%	84,892	
Liberal	2	0	0	0		3.3%	5,278	
Centre Party	1	0	4	-4		1.5%	2,376	
Independent	1					0.091%	154	
Communist	0					0.069%	110	

== Ward results ==
* - Councillor seeking re-election

Comparisons are made with the 1926 election results.

=== Abercromby ===
No. 9 Abercromby
Party	Candidate	Votes	%	±%
Conservative	Cuthbert Frederic Francis *	1,813	54%	
Labour	Bernard Louis Myer	1,535	46%	
Majority		278		
Registered electors		9,020		
Turnout		3,348	37%	
Conservative hold		Swing		

=== Aigburth ===
No. 17 Aigburth
Party	Candidate	Votes	%	±%
Conservative	Frank Campbell Wilson	2,549	69%	
Labour	James Henry Howard	1,147	31%	
Majority		1,402		
Registered electors		7,561		
Turnout		3,696	49%	
Conservative hold		Swing		

=== Allerton ===
No. 35 Allerton
Party	Candidate	Votes	%	±%
Conservative	Herbert John Davis	950	50%	
Labour	Harold Norbury Whittall	626	33%	
Liberal	William John Tristram	317	17%	
Majority		324		
Registered electors		3,903		
Turnout		1,893	49%	
Conservative hold		Swing		

=== Anfield ===
No. 29 Anfield
Party	Candidate	Votes	%	±%
Liberal	Alfred Gates *	2,231	44%	
Conservative	Leonard Holmes	1,723	34%	
Labour	William Albert Robinson jun.	1,164	23%	
Majority		508		
Registered electors		10,873		
Turnout		5,118	47%	
Liberal hold		Swing		

=== Breckfield ===
No. 30 Breckfield
Party	Candidate	Votes	%	±%
Labour	Herbert Edward Rose *	2,430	53%	
Conservative	Charles Hamilton Beatty	2,119	47%	
Majority		311		
Registered electors		10,418		
Turnout		4,549	44%	
Labour hold		Swing		

=== Brunswick ===
No. 11 Brunswick
Party	Candidate	Votes	%	±%
Labour	Lawrence King *	3,615	83%	
Conservative	Thomas Henry Nabb	606	14%	
Independent	John Fitzpatrick Hughes	145	3%	
Majority		3,009		
Registered electors		9,463		
Turnout		4,366	46%	
Labour hold		Swing		

=== Castle Street ===
No. 7 Castle Street
Party	Candidate	Votes	%	±%
Conservative	Robert Garnett Sheldon *	unopposed		
Registered electors				
Conservative hold		Swing		

=== Childwall ===
No. 38 Childwall
Party	Candidate	Votes	%	±%
Conservative	Helena Agnes Dalrymple Muspratt *	893	53%	
Liberal	Alan Carmichael Williams	415	24%	
Labour	Gordon Thomas Pollard	391	23%	
Majority		478		
Registered electors		2,941		
Turnout		1,699	58%	
Conservative hold		Swing		

=== Croxteth ===
No. 40 Croxteth - 2 seats
Party	Candidate	Votes	%	±%
Labour	George Henry Boothman	2,014	62%	
Labour	Mrs. Mary Lilian Hamilton	1,976	60%	
Conservative	Miss Gertrude Elizabeth Bartlett	1,253	38%	
Conservative	Harry Beckett	1,246	38%	
Majority		761		
Registered electors		8,125		
Turnout		3,267	40%	
Labour win (new seat)				
Labour win (new seat)				

=== Dingle ===
No. 12 Dingle
Party	Candidate	Votes	%	±%
Labour	William Jones *	4,385	51%	
Conservative	Nancy Proctor	4,134	49%	
Majority		251		
Registered electors		15,671		
Turnout		8,519	54%	
Labour hold		Swing		

=== Edge Hill ===
No. 18 Edge Hill
Party	Candidate	Votes	%	±%
Labour	Alexander Griffin	3,143	63%	
Conservative	David Jukes	1,721	33%	
Communist	Leo Joseph McGree	110	2%	
Majority		1,422		
Registered electors		13,310		
Turnout		8,519	54%	
Labour hold		Swing		

=== Everton ===
No. 21 Everton
Party	Candidate	Votes	%	±%
Labour	Frederick Thomas Richardson *	3,787	67%	
Conservative	Harold Edward Davies	1,824	33%	
Majority		1,963		
Registered electors		13,731		
Turnout		5,611	41%	
Labour hold		Swing		

=== Exchange ===
No. 5 Exchange
Party	Candidate	Votes	%	±%
Centre Party	Alice McCormick *	760	66%	
Labour	Margaret McFarlane	384	34%	
Majority		376		
Registered electors		2,697		
Turnout		1,144	42%	
Centre gain from Catholic				

=== Fairfield ===
No. 31 Fairfield
Party	Candidate	Votes	%	±%
Conservative	John Barry *	2,653	59%	
Labour	John Braddock	1,821	41%	
Majority		832		
Registered electors		10,252		
Turnout		4,474	44%	
Conservative hold		Swing		

=== Fazakerley ===
No. 27 Fazakerley
Party	Candidate	Votes	%	±%
Labour	Robert Edwards	2,287	58%	
Conservative	Charles Stuart McNair	1,686	42%	
Majority		601		
Registered electors		9,145		
Turnout		3,973	43%	
Labour gain from Conservative		Swing		

=== Garston ===
No. 37 Garston
Party	Candidate	Votes	%	±%
Conservative	John Case *	2,356	55%	
Labour	William Sydney Dytor	1,957	45%	
Majority		399		
Registered electors		7,124		
Turnout		4,313	61%	
Conservative hold		Swing		

=== Granby ===
No. 14 Granby
Party	Candidate	Votes	%	±%
Independent	Miss Eleanor Florence Rathbone *	Unopposed	N/A	N/A
Registered electors				
Independent hold				

=== Great George ===
No. 10 Great George
Party	Candidate	Votes	%	±%
Labour	Matthew Grogan	1,546	76%	
Conservative	Louise Marie Murray	496	24%	
Majority		1,050		
Registered electors		5,299		
Turnout		2,042	39%	
Labour gain from Catholic		Swing		

=== Kensington ===
No. 19 Kensington
Party	Candidate	Votes	%	±%
Labour	George Edwin Swift	2,576	49%	
Conservative	Thomas Norman Jones *	2,313	44%	
Liberal	Arthur Donald Dennis	347	7%	
Majority		263		
Registered electors		11,485		
Turnout		5,236	46%	
Labour gain from Conservative		Swing		

=== Kirkdale ===
No. 24 Kirkdale
Party	Candidate	Votes	%	±%
Labour	William Henry Barton	4,099	51%	
Conservative	Dr. Archibald Gordon Gullan *	3,913	49%	
Majority		185		
Registered electors		16,959		
Turnout		8,013	47%	
Labour hold		Swing		

=== Low Hill ===
No. 20 Low Hill
Party	Candidate	Votes	%	±%
Labour	Michael Joseph McEntegart *	2,562	58%	
Conservative	Sydney Smart	1,824	42%	
Majority		738		
Registered electors		11,215		
Turnout		4,386	39%	
Labour hold		Swing		

=== Much Woolton ===
No. 36 Much Woolton
Party	Candidate	Votes	%	±%
Conservative	Charles Stuart Pethick *	773	55%	
Conservative	John Francis Roskell Reynolds *	736	53%	
Labour	John Reginald Bevins	513	37%	
Labour	Robert Edward Cottier	495	36%	
Liberal	Edward Alexander Ferguson	108	8%	
Majority		260		
Registered electors		2,046		
Turnout		1,394	68%	
Conservative hold		Swing		
Conservative hold		Swing		

=== Netherfield ===
No. 22 Netherfield
Party	Candidate	Votes	%	±%
Labour	George Chadwick *	3,199	50%	
Conservative	John Walker	3,165	50%	
Majority		34		
Registered electors		12,438		
Turnout		6,364	51%	
Labour hold		Swing		

=== North Scotland ===
No. 2 North Scotland
Party	Candidate	Votes	%	±%
Labour	William Albert Robinson *	3,055	88%	
Conservative	William Hallett Hill	427	12%	
Majority		2,628		
Registered electors		8,931		
Turnout		3,482	39%	
Labour hold		Swing		

=== Old Swan ===
No. 32 Old Swan
Party	Candidate	Votes	%	±%
Labour	Thomas Williamson	3,280	48%	
Conservative	Alfred Ernest Shennan *	3,237	48%	
Liberal	William Henry Ledsom	276	4%	
Majority		43		
Registered electors		14,824		
Turnout		6,793	46%	
Labour gain from Conservative		Swing		

=== Prince's Park ===
No. 13 Prince's Park
Party	Candidate	Votes	%	±%
Conservative	Alfred Wood *	2,325	55%	
Labour	Francis Lavery	1,921	45%	
Majority		404		
Registered electors		9,982		
Turnout		4,246	43%	
Conservative hold		Swing		

=== Sandhills ===
No. 1 Sandhills
Party	Candidate	Votes	%	±%
Labour	James William Baker *	3,695	81%	
Conservative	Joseph Edward Freeman	868	19%	
Majority		2,737		
Registered electors		9,565		
Turnout		4,473	47%	
Labour gain from Catholic		Swing		

=== St. Anne's ===
No. 6 St. Anne's
Party	Candidate	Votes	%	±%
Labour	Maurice Eschwege *	3,463	81%	
Centre	Henry Granby	834	19%	
Majority		2,629		
Registered electors		9,751		
Turnout		4,297	44%	
Labour hold		Swing		

=== St. Domingo ===
No. 23 St. Domingo
Party	Candidate	Votes	%	±%
Conservative	William Edward Backhouse *	2,882	54%	
Labour	William John Daniel	2,473	46%	
Majority		409		
Registered electors		12,053		
Turnout		5,355	44%	
Conservative hold		Swing		

=== St. Peter's ===
No. 8 St. Peter's
Party	Candidate	Votes	%	±%
Liberal	Lawrence Durning Holt *	1,130	71%	
Labour	Frederick William Tucker	472	29%	
Majority		658		
Registered electors		3,070		
Turnout		1,602	52%	
Liberal hold		Swing		

=== Sefton Park East ===
No. 15 Sefton Park East
Party	Candidate	Votes	%	±%
Conservative	Michael Cory Dixon *	2,382	71%	
Labour	Peter Leslie Duncan	967	29%	
Majority		1,415		
Registered electors		9,138		
Turnout		3,349	37%	
Conservative hold		Swing		

=== Sefton Park West ===
No. 16 Sefton Park West
Party	Candidate	Votes	%	±%
Conservative	Ronald Percy Clayton	2,057	71%	
Labour	Gertrude Annie Cole	830	29%	
Majority		1,227		
Registered electors		6,341		
Turnout		2,887	46%	
Conservative hold		Swing		

=== South Scotland ===
No. 3 South Scotland
Party	Candidate	Votes	%	±%
Labour	John Sheehan	2,604	59%	
Centre	John Gerald Murphy	1,793	41%	
Majority		811	18%	N/A
Registered electors		9,235		
Turnout		4,397	48%	
Labour gain from Catholic		Swing		

=== Vauxhall ===
No. 4 Vauxhall
Party	Candidate	Votes	%	±%
Labour	Dr. Percy Henry Hayes *	1,016	57%	
Centre	James O'Hare	782	43%	
Majority		234		
Registered electors		3,979		
Turnout		1,798	45%	
Labour gain from Catholic		Swing		

=== Walton ===
No. 25 Walton
Party	Candidate	Votes	%	±%
Conservative	George Miller Platt *	3,638	52%	
Labour	Richard Thomas Hughes	3,411	48%	
Majority		227		
Registered electors		16,437		
Turnout		7,409	43%	
Conservative hold		Swing		

=== Warbreck ===
No. 26 Warbreck
Party	Candidate	Votes	%	±%
Conservative	James Jude *	2,536	50%	
Labour	James Charles Branson	2,109	41%	
Liberal	Sydney Frederick Heape	454	9%	
Majority		427		
Registered electors		12,425		
Turnout		5,099	41%	
Conservative hold		Swing		

=== Wavertree ===
No. 34 Wavertree
Party	Candidate	Votes	%	±%
Conservative	Albert Edward Martin	3,248	54%	
Labour	John Gibbon Elliott *	2,717	46%	
Majority		531		
Registered electors		14,314		
Turnout		5,965	42%	
Conservative hold		Swing		

=== Wavertree West ===
No. 33 Wavertree West
Party	Candidate	Votes	%	±%
Labour	Mrs. Caroline Whiteley	2,389	52%	
Conservative	Mrs. Mary Jane Haigh	2,186	48%	
Majority		203		
Registered electors		8,901		
Turnout		4,575	51%	
Conservative hold		Swing		

=== West Derby ===
No. 28 West Derby
Party	Candidate	Votes	%	±%
Conservative	Albert Morrow	3,504	54%	
Labour	Jolin Eveson	2,928	46%	
Majority		576		
Registered electors		17,673		
Turnout		6,432	36%	
Conservative hold		Swing		

== Aldermanic Elections ==
=== Aldermanic Election 9 November 1929 ===
The terms of office of sixteen aldermen expired on 9 November 1929, and two additional vacancies were caused by the elections of Herbert John Davis and Frank Campbell Wilson as Councillors.

18 Aldermen were elected under the provisions of the Municipal Corporations Act, 1882, by the councillors on 9 November 1929 for a term of six years. Each Alderman acted as the returning officer to the ward to which they were allocated.

- - re-elected aldermen.

Party	Alderman	Allocated ward
Conservative	Joseph Ashworth *	No. 31 Fairfield
Conservative	Henry Langton Beckwith *	No. 37 Garston
Labour	Thomas Wafer Byrne	No. 24 Kirkdale
Labour	John Clancy *	No. 10 Great George
Centre	Harold Edward Davies *	No. 19 Kensington
Conservative	Thomas Dowd *	No. 26 Warbreck
Conservative	John Gordon *	No. 12 Dingle
Conservative	Edwin Haigh *	No. 8 Saint Peter's
Conservative	Maxwell Hyslop Maxwell C.B.E. *	No. 28 West Derby
Conservative	John George Moyles M.B.E.	No.34 Wavertree
Conservative	William Muirhead *	No. 22 Netherfield
Conservative	John George Paris *	No. 15 Sefton Park East
Labour	Frederick Thomas Richardson	No. 38 Childwall
Labour	William Albert Robinson	No. 21 Everton
Conservative	Charles Henry Rutherford *	No. 25 Walton
Labour	James Sexton C.B.E. MP	No. 14 Granby
Labour	Henry Walker	No. 33 Wavertree West
Labour	Charles Wilson	No. 18 Edge Hill

Councillor David Gilbert Logan JP (Labour, North Scotland, elected 1 November 1927) of 362a Scotland Road, Liverpool was elected by the councillors as an alderman for the Croxteth ward on 9 November 1929 pursuant to the Order of His Majesty in Council dated 5 July 1929.

Party	Alderman	Allocated ward
Labour	David Gilbert Logan	No. 40 Croxteth

=== Aldermanic Election 2 April 1930 ===
Following the death on 17 February 1930 of Alderman Charles Henry Rutherford JP (Conservative, last elected as an alderman on 9 November 1929), Councillor Mabel Fletcher JP (Conservative, Sefton Park West, elected 1 November 1927) was elected as an alderman by the councillors on 2 April 1930.

Aldermanic Election 2 April 1930
Party	Name	Votes	Percentage
Conservative	Councillor Mabel Fletcher	53	55%
Labour	Councillor Herbert Edward Rose	44	45%

=== Aldermanic Election 1 October 1930 ===
Following the death on 8 May 1930 of Alderman Herbert Reynolds Rathbone (Liberal, last elected as an alderman on 9 November 1926), Councillor Burton William Eills JP (Liberal, St. Peter's, elected 1 November 1927) was elected as an alderman by the councillors on 1 October 1930.

Aldermanic Election 1 October 1930
Party	Name	Votes	Percentage
Liberal	Councillor Burton William Eills	50	56%
Labour	Councillor Herbert Edward Rose	40	44%

== By-elections ==
=== No. 20 Low Hill, 7 November 1929 ===
Caused by the resignation of Councillor Edward Gerard Deery (Labour, Low Hill, elected on 1 November 1927), which was reported to the Council on 23 October 1929.

No. 20 Low Hill
Party	Candidate	Votes	%	±%
Labour	Joseph Whitehead	2,624	62%	
Conservative	Thomas Broster	1,615	38%	
Majority		1,009		
Registered electors		11,215		
Turnout		4,239	38%	
Labour hold		Swing		

The term of office to expire on 1 November 1930.

=== No.12 Dingle, 20 November 1929 ===
Caused by the election of Councillor William Wallace Kelly (Conservative, elected as an alderman on 23 October 1929)

No. 12 Dingle
Party	Candidate	Votes	%	±%
Conservative	Mrs. Nancy Proctor	4,291	50.4%	
Labour	Alfred Demain	4,224	49.6%	
Majority		67		
Registered electors		15,671		
Turnout		8,515	54%	
Conservative hold		Swing		

=== No. 18 Edge Hill, 27 November 1929 ===
Caused by the election of Councillor Charles Wilson (Labour, Edge Hill, elected 1 November 1928) as an alderman by the councillors on 9 November 1929.

No. 18 Edge Hill
Party	Candidate	Votes	%	±%
Labour	Mrs. Sarah Anne McArd	unopposed		
Registered electors		13,310		
Labour hold		Swing		

=== No. 6 St. Anne's, 28 November 1929 ===
Caused by the election of Councillor James Sexton C.B.E. MP (Labour, St. Anne's, elected 1 November 1927) as an alderman by the councillors on 9 November 1929.

No. 6 St. Anne's
Party	Candidate	Votes	%	±%
	Mrs. Louise Frances Hughes	unopposed		
Majority				
Registered electors		9,751		
Turnout				
		Swing		

=== No. 1 Sandhills, 3 December 1929 ===
Caused by the election of Councillor Thomas Wafer Byrne (Labour, Sandhills, elected 1 November 1928) as an alderman by the councillors on 9 November 1929.

No. 1 Sandhills
Party	Candidate	Votes	%	±%
Labour	Thomas Henry Dunford	unopposed		
Registered electors		9,565		
Labour hold		Swing		

=== No. 2 North Scotland, 3 December 1929 ===
Caused by the election of Councillors William Albert Robinson (Labour, North Scotland, elected 1 November 1929) and David Gilbert Logan (Labour, North Scotland, elected 1 November 1927) as aldermen by the councillors on 9 November 1929.

No. 2 North Scotland 2 seats
Party	Candidate	Votes	%	±%
Labour	Patrick Duffy	unopposed		
Labour	Mrs. Margaret McFarlane	unopposed		
Registered electors		8,931		
Labour hold		Swing		
Labour hold		Swing		

=== No. 21 Everton, 3 December 1929 ===
Caused by the election of Councillors Frederick Thomas Richardson (Labour, Everton, elected 1 November 1929) and Henry Walker (Labour, Everton, elected 1 November 1928) as aldermen by the councillors on 9 November 1929.

No. 21 Everton 2 seats
Party	Candidate	Votes	%	±%
Labour	John Braddock	unopposed		
Labour	Albert Smitton	unopposed		
Registered electors		13,731		
Labour hold		Swing		
Labour hold		Swing		

=== No. 7 Castle Street, 17 December 1929 ===
Caused by the resignation of Councillor Sir John Sandeman Allen MP (Conservative, Castle Street, elected unopposed 1 November 1928) which was reported to the Council on 4 December 1929

No. 7 Castle Street
Party	Candidate	Votes	%	±%
Conservative	Alfred Ernest Shennan	957	96%	
	Charles Harry Taunton	41	4%	
Majority		916		
Registered electors				
Turnout		998		
Conservative hold		Swing		

=== No. 15 Sefton Park East, 11 March 1930 ===
Caused by the death of Councillor Sir Arnold Rushton JP (Conservative, Sefton Park East, elected 1 November 1928) on 5 February 1930 .

No. 15 Sefton Park East
Party	Candidate	Votes	%	±%
Conservative	Engineer Captain Gordon Robertson RN	1,815	58%	
	Aled Owen Roberts	934	30%	
	Frederick Stapleton	359	12%	
Majority		881		
Registered electors		9,138		
Turnout		3,108	34%	
Conservative hold		Swing		

=== No. 16 Sefton Park West, ===
Caused by the election as an alderman on 2 April 1930 of Councillor Mabel Fletcher JP (Conservative, Sefton Park West, elected 1 November 1926), following the death of Alderman Charles Henry Rutherford JP (Conservative, last elected as an alderman on 9 November 1928) on 17 February 1930.

=== No. 8 St. Peter's, ===
Following the death on 8 May 1930 of Alderman Herbert Reynolds Rathbone (Liberal, last elected as an alderman on 9 November 1926), Councillor Burton William Eills JP (Liberal, St. Peter's, elected 1 November 1927) was elected as an alderman by the councillors on 1 October 1930 causing a vacancy in the St. Peter's ward

=== No. 27 Fazakerley, 3 June 1930 ===
Caused by the resignation of Councillor George Herbert Charters (Conservative, Fazakerley, elected 1 November 1927) was reported to the Council on 22 May 1930.

No. 27 Fazakerley
Party	Candidate	Votes	%	±%
Conservative	William Greenough Gregson	1,798	58%	
Labour	Bernard Louis Myer	1,295	42%	
Majority		503		
Registered electors		9,145		
Turnout		3,093	34%	
Conservative hold		Swing		

=== No. 18 Edge Hill, 3 August 1930 ===
Caused by the resignation of Councillor Robert Tissyman (Labour, Edge Hill, elected 1 November 1927), which was reported to the Council on 30 July 1930.

No.18 Edge Hill
Party	Candidate	Votes	%	±%
Labour	Robert Tissyman *	986	63%	
Conservative	Henry Osmond Pugh	585	37%	
Majority		1,422		
Registered electors		13,310		
Turnout		1,571	12%	
Labour hold		Swing		

== See also ==
- Liverpool City Council
- Liverpool Town Council elections 1835 - 1879
- Liverpool City Council elections 1880–present
- Mayors and Lord Mayors of Liverpool 1207 to present
- History of local government in England
