= 1926 Liverpool City Council election =

1926 UK local government election

← 1925	1 November 1926	1927 →

38 councillors' seats were up for election

Elections to Liverpool City Council were held on 1 November 1926.

One third of the council seats were up for election. The term of office for each councillor being three years.

Six of the thirty-eight seats up for election were uncontested.

After the election, the composition of the council was:

Party	Councillors	±	Aldermen	Total
Conservative	68	-3	28	96
Labour	18	+6	0	18
Catholic	15	-3	5	20
Liberal	7	0	5	12
Protestant	2	-1	0	2
Independent	2	0	0	2

== Election result ==
Liverpool local election result 1926
Party	Seats	Gains	Losses	Net gain/loss	Seats %	Votes %	Votes	+/−
Conservative	20					41.1%	49,572	
Labour	7					44.2%	53,330	
Catholic	6					7.5%	9,027	
Liberal	4					3.0%	3,578	
Independent	1					2.1%	2,581	
Constitutionalist and Protestant	0	0	1	-1	0%	1.6%	1,883	
Co-operative Party	0					0.25%	307	
Ex-Service	0					0.18%	214	
Communist	0					0.027%	32	

== Ward results ==
* - Councillor seeking re-election

Comparisons are made with the 1923 election results.

=== Abercromby ===
No. 9 Abercromby
Party	Candidate	Votes	%	±%
Conservative	Cuthbert Frederick Francis *	1,899	60%	
Labour	Samuel Sydney Silverman	1,263	40%	
Majority		636		
Registered electors		8,221		
Turnout		3,162	38%	
Conservative hold		Swing		

=== Aigburth ===
No. 17 Aigburth
Party	Candidate	Votes	%	±%
Conservative	Alan Layfield	unopposed		
Registered electors		5,831		
Conservative hold		Swing		

=== Allerton ===
No. 35 Allerton
Party	Candidate	Votes	%	±%
Conservative	William James Austin *	674	63%	
Liberal	William Murphy	395	37%	
Majority		279		
Registered electors		2,619		
Turnout		1,069	41%	
Conservative hold		Swing		

=== Anfield ===
No. 29 Anfield
Party	Candidate	Votes	%	±%
Liberal	Alfred Gates *	2,036	42%	
Conservative	Albert Morrow	1,620	34%	
Labour	Joseph Jackson Cleary	1,167	24%	
Majority		416		
Registered electors		9,663		
Turnout		4,828	50%	
Liberal hold		Swing		

=== Breckfield ===
No. 30 Breckfield
Party	Candidate	Votes	%	±%
Labour	Herbert Edward Rose	1,977	51%	
Constitutionalist & Protestant	Rev. Harry Dixon Longbottom *	1,883	49%	
Majority		94		
Registered electors		9,846		
Turnout		3,860	39%	
Labour gain from Protestant		Swing		

=== Brunswick ===
No. 11 Brunswick
Party	Candidate	Votes	%	±%
Catholic	Lawrence King *	unopposed		
Registered electors		8,570		
Catholic hold		Swing		

=== Castle Street ===
No. 7 Castle Street
Party	Candidate	Votes	%	±%
	Richard Rutherford	unopposed		
Registered electors		12,593		
		Swing		

=== Childwall ===
No. 38 Childwall
Party	Candidate	Votes	%	±%
Conservative	Lady Helena Agnes Dalrymple Muspratt *	674	59%	
Labour	Mrs. Mary Lilian Hamilton	356	31%	
Liberal	James Whiteside	104	9%	
Majority		318		
Registered electors		1,795		
Turnout		1,134	63%	
Conservative gain from Liberal		Swing		

N.B Lady Helena Agnes Dalrymple Muspratt had crossed the floor from the Liberals to the Conservatives since being elected under the Liberal ticket in 1923.

=== Dingle ===
No. 12 Dingle
Party	Candidate	Votes	%	±%
Conservative	Joseph Dalton Flood *	3,842	52%	
Labour	John Henry Roberts Latham	3,589	48%	
Majority		253		
Registered electors		14,497		
Turnout		7,431	51%	
Conservative hold		Swing		

=== Edge Hill ===
No. 18 Edge Hill
Party	Candidate	Votes	%	±%
Labour	William Smith	3,315	59%	
Conservative	Miss Essie Ruth Conway	2,340	41%	
Majority		975		
Registered electors		12,679		
Turnout		5,655	45%	
Labour gain from Conservative		Swing		

=== Everton ===
No. 21 Everton
Party	Candidate	Votes	%	±%
Labour	Frederick Thomas Richardson	4,028	63%	
Conservative	John Ellis *	2,411	37%	
Majority		1,617		
Registered electors		12,782		
Turnout		6,439	50%	
Labour gain from Conservative		Swing		

=== Exchange ===
No. 5 Exchange
Party	Candidate	Votes	%	±%
Catholic	Miss Alice McCormick *	709	77%	
Ex-Services	Albert Edward Price	214	23%	
Majority		495		
Registered electors		2,758		
Turnout		923	33%	
Catholic gain from Irish Nationalist		Swing		

=== Fairfield ===
No. 31 Fairfield
Party	Candidate	Votes	%	±%
Conservative	John Barry *	2,261	60%	
Labour	Victor Harold Edgar Baker	1,483	40%	
Majority		778		
Registered electors		9,457		
Turnout		3,744	40%	
Conservative gain from Liberal		Swing		

=== Fazakerley ===
No. 27 Fazakerley
Party	Candidate	Votes	%	±%
Conservative	Albert Harwood Letheren *	868	67%	
Labour	Richard Austin Rockliff	418	33%	
Majority		450		
Registered electors		3,070		
Turnout		1,286	42%	
Conservative hold		Swing		

=== Garston ===
No. 37 Garston
Party	Candidate	Votes	%	±%
Conservative	John Case *	1,776	52%	
Labour	James Lawrenson	1,616	48%	
Majority		160		
Registered electors		6,287		
Turnout		3,392	54%	
Conservative hold		Swing		

=== Granby ===
No. 14 Granby
Party	Candidate	Votes	%	±%
Independent	Miss Eleanor Florence Rathbone *	2,581	62%	
Conservative	Kenneth Thorley Graham	1,587	38%	
Majority		994		
Registered electors		9,360		
Turnout		4,168	45%	
Independent hold		Swing		

=== Great George ===
No. 10 Great George
Party	Candidate	Votes	%	±%
Catholic	William Grogan *	1,075	57%	
Labour	John Loughlin	816	43%	
Majority		259		
Registered electors		4,694		
Turnout		1,891	40%	
Catholic gain from		Swing		

=== Kensington ===
No. 19 Kensington
Party	Candidate	Votes	%	±%
Conservative	Joseph Ashworth *	2,308	50.4%	
Labour	John Kay	2,268	49.6%	
Majority		40		
Registered electors		10,874		
Turnout		4,576	42%	
Conservative hold		Swing		

=== Kirkdale ===
No. 24 Kirkdale
Party	Candidate	Votes	%	±%
Conservative	Dr. Archibald Gordon Gullan *	2,889	51%	
Labour	Frederick Jones	2,481	44%	
Co-operative Party	Frederick Thomas John Evans	307	5%	
Majority		408		
Registered electors		15,874		
Turnout		5,677	36%	
Conservative hold		Swing		

=== Low Hill ===
No. 20 Low Hill
Party	Candidate	Votes	%	±%
Labour	Michael Joseph McEntegart	2,789	54%	
Conservative	William John Acheson	2,388	46%	
Majority		401		
Registered electors		10,391		
Turnout		5,177	50%	
Labour gain from Conservative		Swing		

=== Much Woolton ===
No. 36 Much Woolton
Party	Candidate	Votes	%	±%
Conservative	John Francis Roskell Reynolds *	600	69%	
Labour	William Henry Paulson	271	31%	
Majority		329		
Registered electors		1,735		
Turnout		871	50%	
Conservative hold		Swing		

=== Netherfield ===
No. 22 Netherfield
Party	Candidate	Votes	%	±%
Labour	George Chadwick	3,341	58%	
Conservative	William Edward McLaclan *	2,380	42%	
Majority		961		
Registered electors		11,808		
Turnout		5,721	48%	
Labour gain from Conservative		Swing		

=== North Scotland ===
No. 2 North Scotland
Party	Candidate	Votes	%	±%
Labour	William Albert Robinson	2,328	57%	
Catholic	Rev. Thomas Joseph Rigby	1,780	43%	
Majority		548		
Registered electors		8,182		
Turnout		4,108	50%	
Labour gain from Irish Nationalist		Swing		

=== Old Swan ===
No. 32 Old Swan
Party	Candidate	Votes	%	±%
Conservative	Alfred Ernest Shennan *	2,195	61%	
Labour	Mrs. Sarah Anne McArd	1,429	39%	
Majority		766		
Registered electors		12,279		
Turnout		3,624	30%	
Conservative hold		Swing		

=== Prince's Park ===
No. 13 Prince's Park
Party	Candidate	Votes	%	±%
Conservative	Alfred Wood *	2,431	58%	
Labour	William Jones	1,757	42%	
Majority		674		
Registered electors		9,410		
Turnout		4,188	45%	
Conservative hold		Swing		

=== Sandhills ===
No. 1 Sandhills
Party	Candidate	Votes	%	±%
Catholic	James William Baker *	1,790	51%	
Conservative	Thomas Henry.Dunford	1,737	49%	
Majority		53		
Registered electors		8,996		
Turnout		3,527	39%	
Catholic gain from Irish Nationalist		Swing		

=== St. Anne's ===
No. 6 St. Anne's
Party	Candidate	Votes	%	±%
Labour	Maurice Eschwege	2,932	73%	
Catholic	Patrick Alfred Durkin *	1,051	26%	
Communist	John Nield	32	0.8%	
Majority		1,881		
Registered electors		8,639		
Turnout		4,015	47%	
Labour gain from Irish Nationalist		Swing		

=== St. Domingo ===
No. 23 St. Domingo
Party	Candidate	Votes	%	±%
Conservative	William Edward Backhouse *	2,128	50.5%	
Labour	John Hamilton	2,087	49.5%	
Majority		41		
Registered electors		11,118		
Turnout		4,215	38%	
Conservative hold		Swing		

=== St. Peter's ===
No. 8 St. Peter's
Party	Candidate	Votes	%	±%
Liberal	Lawrence Durning Holt *	unopposed		
Registered electors		2,931		
Liberal hold		Swing		

=== Sefton Park East ===
No. 15 Sefton Park East
Party	Candidate	Votes	%	±%
Conservative	Michael Cory Dixon *	unopposed		
Registered electors		8,727		
Conservative hold		Swing		

=== Sefton Park West ===
No. 16 Sefton Park West
Party	Candidate	Votes	%	±%
Liberal	Frank Cambell Wilson *	unopposed		
Registered electors		5,944		
Liberal hold		Swing		

=== South Scotland ===
No. 3 South Scotland
Party	Candidate	Votes	%	±%
Catholic	John Gerald Murphy *	1,673	52%	
Labour	Joseph Harrington	1,523	48%	
Majority		150		
Registered electors		8,544		
Turnout		3,196	37%	
Catholic gain from Irish Nationalist		Swing		

=== Vauxhall ===
No. 4 Vauxhall
Party	Candidate	Votes	%	±%
Catholic	Dr. Percy Hayes *	949	71%	
Labour	Henry Hayes	386	29%	
Majority		563		
Registered electors		3,756		
Turnout		1,335	36%	
Catholic gain from Irish Nationalist		Swing		

=== Walton ===
No. 25 Walton
Party	Candidate	Votes	%	±%
Conservative	George Miller Platt *	2,596	56%	
Labour	Thomas Herbert Pye	2,009	44%	
Majority		587		
Registered electors		13,819		
Turnout		4,605	33%	
Conservative hold		Swing		

=== Warbreck ===
No. 26 Warbreck
Party	Candidate	Votes	%	±%
Conservative	James Jude	2,348	61%	
Labour	Francis Lavery	1,509	39%	
Majority		839		
Registered electors		11,450		
Turnout		3,857	34%	
Conservative hold		Swing		

=== Wavertree ===
No. 34 Wavertree
Party	Candidate	Votes	%	±%
Conservative	Henry Langton Beckwith *	2,495	63%	
Labour	William Sidney Dytor	1,466	37%	
Majority		1,029		
Registered electors		12,100		
Turnout		3,961	33%	
Conservative hold		Swing		

=== Wavertree West ===
No. 33 Wavertree West
Party	Candidate	Votes	%	±%
Conservative	Edwin Haigh *	1,697	44%	
Labour	Frederick Stapleton	1,085	28%	
Liberal	John Richard Hobhouse	1,043	27%	
Majority		612		
Registered electors		8,499		
Turnout		3,825	45%	
Conservative hold		Swing		

=== West Derby ===
No. 28 West Derby
Party	Candidate	Votes	%	±%
Conservative	William Henry Young	3,165	62%	
Labour	George Henry Boothman	1,904	38%	
Majority		1,261		
Registered electors		14,607		
Turnout		5,069	35%	
Conservative hold		Swing		

== Aldermanic Elections ==
=== Aldermanic Election 9 November 1926 ===
18 Aldermen were elected by the councillors on 9 November 1926 for a term of six years.

- - re-elected aldermen.

Party	Alderman
Conservative	Sir John Sutherland Harmood Banner Bart. D.L. *
Catholic	James Bolger *
Labour	Thomas Burke JP *
Conservative	Robert Lowry Burns JP *
Conservative	Henry Alexander Cole JP *
Conservative	James Conrad Cross JP *
Liberal	John Lamport Eills JP
Liberal	Jacob Reuben Grant JP *
Catholic	Austin Harford JP *
Unionist	Albert Edward Jacob JP MP *
Liberal	John Lea JP *
Liberal	Richard Robert Meade-King JP *
Conservative	Sir Max Muspratt Bart. *
Liberal	Herbert Reynolds Rathbone JP *
Conservative	Edward Russell-Taylor JP *
Conservative	The Right Hon. Archibald Tutton James Salvidge PC KBE *
Conservative	Anthony Shelmerdine JP *
Liberal	Frederick Smith JP *

=== Aldermanic Elections 2 March 1927 ===
Because Sir John Sutherland Harmood Banner Bart. D.L. refused the offer of the office of Alderman, Councillor Edward West (Liberal, Warbreck, elected unopposed 1 November 1924) was elected by the councillors as an alderman on 2 March 1927

Aldermanic Election 2 March 1927
Party	Name	Votes	Percentage
Liberal	Councillor Edward West	46	98%
Labour	Councillor James Sexton CBE MP	1	2%

The term of office to expire on 9 November 1932.

Following the death of Alderman John Lea (Liberal, last elected as an alderman on 9 November 1926 on 26 January 1927, a poll of councillors was held to elect a replacement :

Aldermanic Election 2 March 1927
Party	Name	Votes	Percentage
Labour	Councillor James Sexton CBE MP	42	72%
Labour	Councillor Luke Hogan	15	26%
Liberal	Alderman Edward West	1	2%

The term of office to expire on 9 November 1932.

=== Aldermanic Election 5 October 1927 ===
Because Councillor James Sexton CBE MP refused the office of alderman, (to which he was elected by the councillors on 2 March 1927), which was reported to the council on 6 April 1927

Councillor Luke Hogan (Labour, Brunswick, elected 1 November 1924) was elected as an alderman by a poll of the councillors on 5 October 1927.

Aldermanic Election 2 March 1927
Party	Name	Votes	Percentage
Labour	Councillor Luke Hogan	36	97%
Protestant	Councillor John Walker	1	3%

The term of office to expire on 9 November 1932.

== By-elections ==
=== No. 19 Kensington, 14 December 1926 ===
Following the death of Councillor Henry Baxter (Conservative, Kensington, elected 1 November 1924) on 10 November 1926,

No. 19 Kensington 14 December 1926
Party	Candidate	Votes	%	±%
Conservative	Ambrose Fry	2,688	51%	
Labour	John Kay	2,618	49%	
Majority		70		
Registered electors		10,874		
Turnout		5,306	47%	
Conservative hold		Swing		

=== No. 26 Warbreck, 22 March 1927 ===
Caused by Councillor Edward West (Liberal, Warbreck, elected unopposed 1 November 1924) being elected by the councillors as an alderman on 2 March 1927 because Sir John Sutherland Harmood Banner Bart. D.L. refused the offer of the office of Alderman.

No. 26 Warbreck 22 March 1927
Party	Candidate	Votes	%	±%
Conservative	John Hill	2,165	64%	
Labour	Francis Lavery	1,023	36%	
Majority		1,142		
Registered electors		11,450		
Turnout		3,188	28%	
Conservative hold		Swing		

=== No. 37 Garston, 17 May 1927 ===
Caused by the death of Councillor Edmund Robert Thompson (Conservative, Garston, elected 1 November 1925) on 22 April 1927.

No. 37 Garston 17 May 1927
Party	Candidate	Votes	%	±%
Conservative	Joseph Williams	1,731	51%	
Labour	Joseph Jackson Cleary	1,684	49%	
Majority		47		
Registered electors		6,287		
Turnout		3,415	54%	
Conservative hold		Swing		

=== No. 37 Garston, 23 June 1927 ===
Caused by the death of Councillor George Atkin (Conservative, Garston, elected 1 November 1924) on 24 May 1927.

No. 37 Garston 23 June 1927
Party	Candidate	Votes	%	±%
Conservative	Edward Wrake Turner	1,841	46%	
Labour	Joseph Jackson Cleary	1,827	46%	
Liberal	Neil Norman McKinnon	335	8%	
Majority		14		
Registered electors		6,287		
Turnout		4,003	64%	
Conservative hold		Swing		

== See also ==
- Liverpool City Council
- Liverpool Town Council elections 1835 - 1879
- Liverpool City Council elections 1880–present
- Mayors and Lord Mayors of Liverpool 1207 to present
- History of local government in England
