= 1925 Liverpool City Council election =

1925 UK local government election

← 1924	2 November 1925	1926 →

37 councillors' seats were up for election

Elections to Liverpool City Council were held on 2 November 1925.

One third of the council seats were up for election. The term of office for each councillor being three years.

Eight of the thirty-seven seats up for election were uncontested.

After the election, the composition of the council was:

Party	Councillors	±	Aldermen	Total
Conservative	68	0	27	95
Liberal	12	-2	6	18
Catholic	18	+1	4	22
Labour	11	+3	1	12
Independent	2	+1	0	2
Protestant	2	+1	0	2
Communist	0	-1	0	0

== Election result ==
Liverpool local election result 1925
Party	Seats	Gains	Losses	Net gain/loss	Seats %	Votes %	Votes	+/−
Conservative	23	2	2	0	62%	44%	59,167	
Catholic	7	7	0	+7	19%	7.3%	9,770	
Labour	4	3	1	+2	11%	36%	48,153	
Liberal	1	0	2	-2	3%	5.9%	7,905	
Protestant	1	1	0	+1	3%	2.4%	3,185	
Independent	1	1	0	+1	3%	2%		

== Ward results ==
* - Councillor seeking re-election

Comparisons are made with the 1922 election results.

=== Abercromby ===
No. 9 Abercromby
Party	Candidate	Votes	%	±%
Conservative	Edwin Thompson *	unopposed		
Registered electors		8,077		
Conservative hold		Swing		

=== Aigburth ===
No. 17 Aigburth
Party	Candidate	Votes	%	±%
Conservative	Wilfred Bowring Stoddart *	unopposed		
Registered electors		5,507		
Conservative hold		Swing		

=== Allerton ===
No. 35 Allerton
Party	Candidate	Votes	%	±%
Independent	Mrs. Gertrude Elizabeth Wilson	1,041	78%	
Labour	George Frederick Dutton	298	22%	
Majority		743		
Registered electors		2,487		
Turnout		1,339	54%	
Independent win (new seat)				

=== Anfield ===
No. 29 Anfield
Party	Candidate	Votes	%	±%
Conservative	George Young Williamson *	2,633	49%	
Liberal	Walter Henry Cartwright	1,342	25%	
Labour	Joseph Jackson Cleary	1,416	26%	
Majority		1,291		
Registered electors		9,493		
Turnout		5,391	57%	
Conservative hold		Swing		

=== Breckfield ===
No. 30 Breckfield
Party	Candidate	Votes	%	±%
Conservative	Edward James Jones *	2,822	59%	
Labour	Thomas Joseph Conway Rowan	1,966	41%	
Majority		856		
Registered electors		9,957		
Turnout		4,788	48%	
Conservative hold		Swing		

=== Brunswick ===
No. 11 Brunswick
Party	Candidate	Votes	%	±%
Catholic	John Alfred Kelly *	unopposed		
Registered electors		8,523		
Catholic gain from Irish Nationalist		Swing		

=== Castle Street ===
No. 7 Castle Street
Party	Candidate	Votes	%	±%
Conservative	John Sandeman Allen MP *	Unopposed	N/A	N/A
Registered electors		2,586		
Conservative hold				

=== Dingle ===
No. 12 Dingle
Party	Candidate	Votes	%	±%
Conservative	William Wallace Kelly *	5,314	56%	
Labour	Mrs. Gertrude Annie Cole	4,252	44%	
Majority		1,062		
Registered electors		14,466		
Turnout		9,566	66%	
Conservative hold		Swing		

=== Edge Hill ===
No. 18 Edge Hill
Party	Candidate	Votes	%	±%
Labour	Charles Wilson	3,542	55%	
Conservative	Robert John Hall *	2,916	45%	
Majority		626		
Registered electors		12,571		
Turnout		6,458	51%	
Labour gain from Conservative		Swing		

=== Everton ===
No. 21 Everton
Party	Candidate	Votes	%	±%
Labour	Henry Walker *	4,732	59%	
Conservative	Alfred Hemmons	3,329	41%	
Majority		1,403		
Registered electors		12,768		
Turnout		8,061	63%	
Labour hold		Swing		

=== Exchange ===
No. 5 Exchange
Party	Candidate	Votes	%	±%
Catholic	Peter Kavanagh *	unopposed		
Registered electors		2,805		
Catholic gain from Irish Nationalist		Swing		

=== Fairfield ===
No. 31 Fairfield
Party	Candidate	Votes	%	±%
Conservative	Arthur John Chapman-Durrant	2,813	57%	
Labour	Victor Harold Edgar Baker	1,346	27%	
Liberal	Edward Darius Roberts	814	16%	
Majority		1,467		
Registered electors		9,445		
Turnout		4,973	53%	
Conservative gain from Liberal		Swing		

=== Fazakerley ===
No. 27 Fazakerley
Party	Candidate	Votes	%	±%
Conservative	Francis Samuel Henwood Ashcroft	944	56%	
Labour	Albert Frederick Johnson	410	24%	
Protestant	Rev. Harry Dixon Longbottom	341	20%	
Majority		534		
Registered electors		2,886		
Turnout		1,695	59%	
Conservative hold		Swing		

=== Garston ===
No. 37 Garston
Party	Candidate	Votes	%	±%
Conservative	Edmund Robert Thompson *	2,010	57%	
Labour	James Lawrenson	1,521	43%	
Majority		489		
Registered electors		6,175		
Turnout		3,531	57%	
Conservative hold		Swing		

=== Granby ===
No. 14 Granby
Party	Candidate	Votes	%	±%
Liberal	Frederick Charles Bowring *	2,851	62%	
Labour	William Henrty Barton	1,734	38%	
Majority		1,117		
Registered electors		9,450		
Turnout		4,585	49%	
Liberal hold		Swing		

=== Great George ===
No. 10 Great George
Party	Candidate	Votes	%	±%
Catholic	Thomas Owen Ruddin *	1,199	68%	
Labour	Alfred James Ward	561	32%	
Majority		638		
Registered electors		4,645		
Turnout		1,760	38%	
Catholic gain from Irish Nationalist		Swing		

=== Kensington ===
No. 19 Kensington
Party	Candidate	Votes	%	±%
Conservative	John Hughes Rutherford *	3,403	60%	
Labour	Richard Austin Rockliffe	2,310	40%	
Majority		1,093		
Registered electors		10,874		
Turnout		5,713	53%	
Conservative hold		Swing		

=== Kirkdale ===
No. 24 Kirkdale
Party	Candidate	Votes	%	±%
Conservative	Robert Garnett Sheldon *	3,824	77%	
ex-Service	John Dodd	1,165	23%	
Majority		2,659		
Registered electors		15,740		
Turnout		4,989	32%	
Conservative hold		Swing		

=== Little Woolton ===
No. 39 Little Woolton
Party	Candidate	Votes	%	±%
Conservative	Rupert Henry Bremner *	267	94%	
Labour	John Henry Naylor Junr.	16	6%	
Majority		251		
Registered electors		443		
Turnout		283	64%	
Conservative hold		Swing		

=== Low Hill ===
No. 20 Low Hill
Party	Candidate	Votes	%	±%
Labour	Fred Robinson	2,880	51%	
Conservative	Robert Edward Bibby Trevor	2,818	49%	
Majority		62		
Registered electors		10,392		
Turnout		5,698	55%	
Labour gain from Conservative		Swing		

=== Netherfield ===
No. 22 Netherfield
Party	Candidate	Votes	%	±%
Protestant	John Walker *	2,844	58%	
Labour	George Chadwick	2,023	42%	
Majority		821		
Registered electors		11,753		
Turnout		4,867	41%	
Protestant gain from Patriotic Labour				

=== North Scotland ===
No. 2 North Scotland
Party	Candidate	Votes	%	±%
Catholic	Mgr. Thomas George	3,465	85%	
Labour	Richard McCann *	617	15%	
Independent	John Kearney	255	6%	
Majority		2,848		
Registered electors		8,121		
Turnout		4,082	50%	
Catholic gain from Labour		Swing		

=== Old Swan ===
No. 32 Old Swan
Party	Candidate	Votes	%	±%
Conservative	John Waterworth *	3,193	66%	
Labour	Robert Joseph McDonnall	1,648	34%	
Majority		1,545		
Registered electors		11,996		
Turnout		4,841	40%	
Conservative hold		Swing		

=== Prince's Park ===
No. 13 Prince's Park
Party	Candidate	Votes	%	±%
Conservative	David Mawdsley Ritchie *	3,259	64%	
Labour	Robert Dixon-Smith	1,815	36%	
Majority		1,444		
Registered electors		9,344		
Turnout		5,074	54%	
Conservative hold		Swing		

=== Sandhills ===
No. 1 Sandhills
Party	Candidate	Votes	%	±%
Labour	Thomas Wafer Byrne *	2,829	63%	
Catholic	William Henry McGuiness	1,695	37%	
Majority		1,134		
Registered electors		8,995		
Turnout		4,524	50%	
Labour gain from Irish Nationalist		Swing		

=== St. Anne's ===
No. 6 St. Anne's
Party	Candidate	Votes	%	±%
Catholic	James Farrell Jnr.	2,093	48%	
Labour	Maurice Eschwege	1,545	36%	
Communist	John Nield *	705	16%	
Independent	John Corcoran	27	1%	
Majority		548		
Registered electors		8,639		
Turnout		4,343	50%	
Catholic gain from Independent Labour		Swing		

=== St. Domingo ===
No. 23 St. Domingo
Party	Candidate	Votes	%	±%
Conservative	Thomas White *	3,565	68%	
Liberal	Mrs. Sarah Anne McArd	1,648	32%	
Majority		1,917		
Registered electors		11,130		
Turnout		5,213	47%	
Conservative hold		Swing		

=== St. Peter's ===
No. 8 St. Peter's
Party	Candidate	Votes	%	±%
Conservative	Herbert Wolfe Levy *	766	57%	
Labour	John Loughlin	369	27%	
Independent	Frederick Bowman	207	15%	
Majority		397		
Registered electors		2,947		
Turnout		1,342	46%	
Conservative hold		Swing		

=== Sefton Park East ===
No. 15 Sefton Park East
Party	Candidate	Votes	%	±%
Conservative	Sir Arnold Rushton *	unopposed		
Registered electors		8,899		
Conservative hold		Swing		

=== Sefton Park West ===
No. 16 Sefton Park West
Party	Candidate	Votes	%	±%
Conservative	James Graham Reece	2,051	56%	
Liberal	Hugh Reynolds Rathbone	1,580	44%	
Majority		471	12%	
Registered electors		6,047		
Turnout		3,631	60%	
Conservative gain from Liberal		Swing		

=== South Scotland ===
No. 3 South Scotland
Party	Candidate	Votes	%	±%
Catholic	Michael O'Mahony *	3,013	65%	
Labour	Edward Campbell	1,646	35%	
Majority		1,367		
Registered electors		8,468		
Turnout		4,659	55%	
Catholic gain from Irish Nationalist		Swing		

=== Vauxhall ===
No. 4 Vauxhall
Party	Candidate	Votes	%	±%
Catholic	Thomas Arthur Murphy *	unopposed		
Registered electors		3,848		
Catholic gain from Irish Nationalist		Swing		

=== Walton ===
No. 25 Walton
Party	Candidate	Votes	%	±%
Conservative	William Swift	unopposed		
Registered electors		13,042		
Conservative hold		Swing		

=== Warbreck ===
No. 26 Warbreck
Party	Candidate	Votes	%	±%
Conservative	Alexander Critchley	3,515	68%	
Labour	Francis Lavery	1,673	32%	
Majority		1,842		
Registered electors		11,430		
Turnout		5,188	45%	
Conservative hold		Swing		

=== Wavertree ===
No. 34 Wavertree
Party	Candidate	Votes	%	±%
Conservative	Arthur Angers *	2,860	50%	
Labour	William Sidney Dytor	1,598	28%	
Liberal	Ernest Eric Edwards	1,318	23%	
Majority		1,262		
Registered electors		11,603		
Turnout		5,776	50%	
Conservative hold		Swing		

=== Wavertree West ===
No. 33 Wavertree West
Party	Candidate	Votes	%	±%
Conservative	William Morey Paul	2,414	57%	
Labour	Herbert Edward Rose	1,794	43%	
Majority		620		
Registered electors		8,555		
Turnout		4,208	49%	
Conservative hold		Swing		

=== West Derby ===
No. 28 West Derby
Party	Candidate	Votes	%	±%
Conservative	Robert Duncan French *	4,451	69%	
Labour	George Henry Boothman	1,964	31%	
Majority		2,847		
Registered electors		14,321		
Turnout		6,415	45%	
Conservative hold		Swing		

== Aldermanic Elections ==
=== Aldermanic Election 9 November 1925 ===
The term of office of Alderman William Albert Robinson (Labour, last elected as an alderman on 10 November 1919) expired on this date.

At the Council meeting on 9 November 1925 there were two candidates nominated to fill this position: William Albert Robinson and Councillor Patrick Jeremiah Kelly (Catholic, South Scotland, elected as an Irish Nationalist on 1 November 1924). The result of a poll of Councillors was :

Aldermanic Election 9 November 1925
Party	Name	Votes	Percentage
Catholic	Councillor Patrick Jeremiah Kelly	15	54%
Labour	William Albert Robinson	13	46%

=== Aldermanic Election 3 February 1926 ===
Caused by the death on 14 December 1925 of Alderman Arthur Crosthwaite (Conservative, last elected as an alderman on 9 November 1920).

In a poll of councillors on 3 February 1926, Councillor James Conrad Cross (Conservative, last elected as a councillor on 1 November 1924) was elected in his place.

Aldermanic Election 3 February 1926
Party	Name	Votes	Percentage
Conservative	Councillor James Conrad Cross	58	87%
Labour	William Albert Robinson	9	13%

== By-elections ==
=== No. 30 Breckfield, 1 December 1925 ===
Caused by the death on 20 October 1925 of Councillor Alfred Griffiths (Conservative, Breckfield, elected 1 November 1923).

No. 30 Breckfield 1 December 1925
Party	Candidate	Votes	%	±%
Protestant	Rev. Harry Dixon Longbottom	2,451	53%	
Labour	William Albert Robinson	2,175	47%	
Majority		276	6%	N/A
Registered electors		9,957		
Turnout		4,626	46%	
Protestant gain from Conservative		Swing		

=== No. 25 Walton, Tuesday 16 February 1926 ===
Following the death of Alderman Arthur Crosthwaite on 14 December 1925, Councillor James Conrad Cross (Conservative, last elected as a councillor on 1 November 1924) was elected as an alderman by the councillors on 3 February 1926.

No. 25 Walton Tuesday 16 February 1926
Party	Candidate	Votes	%	±%
Conservative	Robert John Hall	unopposed		
Registered electors				
Conservative hold		Swing		

=== No. 26 Warbreck, 18 February 1926 ===
Caused by the death on 31 January 1926 of Councillor John Albert Thompson (Conservative, elected 1 November 1923)

No. 26 Warbreck 18 February 1926
Party	Candidate	Votes	%	±%
Conservative	James Jude	2,016	59%	
Labour	Francis Lavery	1,394	41%	
Majority		622		
Registered electors		11,430		
Turnout		3,410	30%	
Conservative hold		Swing		

=== No. 18 Edge Hill, Tuesday 20 April 1926 ===
Caused by the death on 18 March 1926 of Councillor Daniel Charles Williams (Conservative, Edge Hill, elected 1 November 1923)

No. 18 Edge Hill Tuesday 20 April 1926
Party	Candidate	Votes	%	±%
Labour	William Smith	3,045	54%	
Conservative	Alan Layfield	2,642	46%	
Majority		403		
Registered electors		12,571		
Turnout		5,687	45%	
Labour gain from Conservative		Swing		

=== No. 28 West Derby, ===
Caused by the death on 21 July 1926 of Councillor Frederick William Riley (Conservative, West Derby, elected 1 November 1923)

No. 28 West Derby
Party	Candidate	Votes	%	±%
Majority				
Registered electors		14,321		
Turnout				
	gain from	Swing		

== See also ==
- Liverpool City Council
- Liverpool Town Council elections 1835 - 1879
- Liverpool City Council elections 1880–present
- Mayors and Lord Mayors of Liverpool 1207 to present
- History of local government in England
