= 1924 Liverpool City Council election =

← 1923	1 November 1924	1925 →

39 councillors' seats were up for election

Elections to Liverpool City Council were held on Saturday 1 November 1924.

One third of the council seats were up for election. The term of office for each councillor being three years.

A second seat was added for the Allerton ward.

Eleven of the thirty-eight seats up for election were uncontested.

As the election was held on a Saturday, the Ballot Act allowed the presiding officer to mark the ballot paper for those people who declared themselves to be of the Jewish Faith.

After the election, the composition of the council was:

Party	Councillors	±	Aldermen	Total
Conservative	??	??	??	??
Liberal	??	??	??	??
Irish Nationalist	??	??	??	??
Labour	??	??	??	??
Protestant	??	??	??	??

== Election result ==
Liverpool local election result 1924
Party	Seats	Gains	Losses	Net gain/loss	Seats %	Votes %	Votes	+/−
Conservative	23	2	2	0	59%	43%	52,070	
Labour	7	4	0	+4	18%	40%	47,986	
Liberal	4	2	2	0	10%	7.8%	9,346	
Irish Nationalist	3	0	2	-2	8%	5.8%	6,943	
Protestant	1	0	0	0	3%	2.1%	2,542	
Independent	1	1	0	+1	3%	1.05%	1,260	
National Liberal	0	0	3	-3	0%	0%	0	

== Ward results ==
* - Councillor seeking re-election

Comparisons are made with the 1921 election results.

=== Abercromby ===
No. 9 Abercromby
Party	Candidate	Votes	%	±%
Conservative	William Thomas Roberts	unopposed		
Registered electors				
Conservative hold		Swing		

=== Aigburth ===
No. 17 Aigburth
Party	Candidate	Votes	%	±%
Conservative	Edward James Deane	unopposed		
Registered electors				
Conservative hold		Swing		

=== Allerton ===
No. 35 Allerton
Party	Candidate	Votes	%	±%
Conservative	George Alfred Strong *	803	64%	
Liberal	Frank Williams	446	36%	
Majority		357		
Registered electors		2,277		
Turnout		1,249	55%	
Conservative win (new seat)				

=== Anfield ===
No. 29 Anfield
Party	Candidate	Votes	%	±%
Conservative	Charles Gordon Snowden Gordon	2,268	43%	
Liberal	William Bowring Stoddart *	2,060	39%	
Labour	John Badlay	897	17%	
Majority		208		
Registered electors		9,500		
Turnout		5,225	55%	
Conservative gain from Liberal		Swing		

=== Breckfield ===
No. 30 Breckfield
Party	Candidate	Votes	%	±%
Conservative	Thomas Henry Burton *	3,000	68%	
Labour	Charles Wilson	1,425	32%	
Majority		1,575		
Registered electors		9,708		
Turnout		4,425	46%	
Conservative hold		Swing		

=== Brunswick ===
No. 11 Brunswick
Party	Candidate	Votes	%	±%
Labour	Luke Hogan *	3,228	69%	
Conservative	Benjamin Fisher	1,456	31%	
Majority		1,772		
Registered electors		8,454		
Turnout		4,684	55%	
Labour hold		Swing		

=== Castle Street ===
No. 7 Castle Street
Party	Candidate	Votes	%	±%
Conservative	William Denton	unopposed		
Registered electors				
Conservative gain from Liberal		Swing		

=== Childwall ===
No. 38 Childwall
Party	Candidate	Votes	%	±%
Conservative	Herbert John Davis *	unopposed		
Registered electors				
Conservative hold		Swing		

=== Dingle ===
No. 12 Dingle
Party	Candidate	Votes	%	±%
Conservative	Frank Bennett Brown *	5,619	62%	
Labour	Robert Joseph McDonnell	3,502	38%	
Majority		2,117		
Registered electors		14,408		
Turnout		9,121	63%	
Conservative hold		Swing		

=== Edge Hill ===
No. 18 Edge Hill
Party	Candidate	Votes	%	±%
Labour	Robert Tissyman	3,373	51%	
Conservative	James Jude *	3,193	49%	
Majority		180		
Registered electors		12,421		
Turnout		6,566	53%	
Labour gain from Conservative		Swing		

=== Everton ===
No. 21 Everton
Party	Candidate	Votes	%	±%
Labour	Bertie Victor Kirby	3,790	54%	
Conservative	Maj. Henry Adam Proctor	3,243	46%	
Independent	David Dolovitz	51	0.72%	
Majority		547	8%	N/A
Registered electors		12,596		
Turnout		7,084	56%	
Labour gain from National Liberal		Swing		

=== Exchange ===
No. 5 Exchange
Party	Candidate	Votes	%	±%
Irish Nationalist	John Quinn *	unopposed		
Registered electors				
Irish Nationalist hold		Swing		

=== Fairfield ===
No. 31 Fairfield
Party	Candidate	Votes	%	±%
Liberal	Charles Sydney Jones	Unopposed	N/A	N/A
Registered electors				
Liberal gain from Conservative				

=== Fazakerley ===
No. 27 Fazakerley
Party	Candidate	Votes	%	±%
Conservative	George Herbert Charters *	1,055	66%	
Labour	Albert Nicholas Denaro	539	34%	
Majority		516		
Registered electors		2,775		
Turnout		1,594	57%	
Conservative hold		Swing		

=== Garston ===
No. 37 Garston
Party	Candidate	Votes	%	±%
Conservative	George Atkin *	2,137	52%	
Labour	Robert Philip Edmunds	1,506	36%	
Liberal	William James Ireland	490	12%	
Majority		631		
Registered electors		6,040		
Turnout		4,133	68%	
Conservative hold		Swing		

=== Granby ===
No. 14 Granby
Party	Candidate	Votes	%	±%
Conservative	Mrs. Rosa Hoch	2,026	41%	
Labour	Charles Burden	1,937	40%	
Liberal	Samuel Skelton sen.	923	19%	
Majority		89		
Registered electors		9,425		
Turnout		4,887	52%	
Conservative hold		Swing		

=== Great George ===
No. 10 Great George
Party	Candidate	Votes	%	±%
Irish Nationalist	Thomas Joseph Marner *	unopposed		
Registered electors				
Irish Nationalist hold		Swing		

=== Kensington ===
No. 19 Kensington
Party	Candidate	Votes	%	±%
Conservative	Henry Baxter	3,204	55%	
Labour	Frederick Thomas Richardson	2,623	45%	
Majority		581		
Registered electors		10,724		
Turnout		5,827	54%	
Conservative hold		Swing		

=== Kirkdale ===
No. 24 Kirkdale
Party	Candidate	Votes	%	±%
Conservative	Charles Porter	4,794	67%	
Labour	Frederick Jones	2,326	33%	
Majority		2,468		
Registered electors		15,312		
Turnout		7,120	46%	
Conservative hold		Swing		

=== Low Hill ===
No. 20 Low Hill
Party	Candidate	Votes	%	±%
Conservative	Alfred Gaskell Alsop *	2,684	52%	
Labour	Thomas Joseph Rowan	2,484	48%	
Majority		200		
Registered electors		10,268		
Turnout		5,168	50%	
Conservative hold		Swing		

=== Much Woolton ===
No. 36 Much Woolton
Party	Candidate	Votes	%	±%
Independent	Robert Gladstone *	785	69%	
Labour	Charles Jabez Edwards	346	31%	
Majority		439		
Registered electors		1,691		
Turnout		1,131	67%	
Independent gain from National Liberal		Swing		

=== Netherfield ===
No. 22 Netherfield
Party	Candidate	Votes	%	±%
Conservative	Alfred Michael Urding *	4,358	73%	
Labour	George Chadwick	1,617	27%	
Majority		2,741		
Registered electors		11,548		
Turnout		5,975	52%	
Conservative hold		Swing		

=== North Scotland ===
No. 2 North Scotland
Party	Candidate	Votes	%	±%
Labour	David Gilbert Logan *	3,403	82%	
Irish Nationalist	Mrs. Elizabeth Geraghty	734	18%	
Majority		2,669		
Registered electors		8,178		
Turnout		4,137	51%	
Labour gain from Irish Nationalist		Swing		

=== Old Swan ===
No. 32 Old Swan
Party	Candidate	Votes	%	±%
Conservative	John Parry Thomas	3,394	68%	
Labour	John Edward Sunners	1,616	32%	
Majority		1,778		
Registered electors		11,733		
Turnout		5,010	43%	
Conservative hold		Swing		

=== Prince's Park ===
No. 13 Prince's Park
Party	Candidate	Votes	%	±%
Conservative	Miss Margaret Beavan *	unopposed		
Registered electors				
Conservative hold		Swing		

=== Sandhills ===
No. 1 Sandhills
Party	Candidate	Votes	%	±%
Labour	Thomas Dakin	2,120	53%	
Irish Nationalist	William Henry McGuiness	1,855	47%	
Majority		265		
Registered electors		8,803		
Turnout		3,975	45%	
Labour gain from Irish Nationalist		Swing		

=== St. Anne's ===
No. 6 St. Anne's
Party	Candidate	Votes	%	±%
Labour	James Sexton MP *	1,567	53%	
Irish Nationalist	James Farrell jun.	1,322	45%	
Independent	John Young	25	0.85%	
Independent	John Corcoran	21	0.72%	
Majority		245		
Registered electors		9,556		
Turnout		2,935	31%	
Labour hold		Swing		

=== St. Domingo ===
No. 23 St. Domingo
Party	Candidate	Votes	%	±%
Protestant	Albert Clayton *	2,542	61%	
Labour	George Williams	1,597	39%	
Majority		945		
Registered electors		10,926		
Turnout		4,139	38%	
Protestant hold		Swing		

=== St. Peter's ===
No. 8 St. Peter's
Party	Candidate	Votes	%	±%
Liberal	Burton William Eills *	846	68%	
Independent	Frederick H. U. Bowman	399	32%	
Majority		447		
Registered electors		2,892		
Turnout		1,245	43%	
Liberal hold		Swing		

=== Sefton Park East ===
No. 15 Sefton Park East
Party	Candidate	Votes	%	±%
Conservative	George Edward Holme *	2,662	67%	
Labour	Alexander Maver Finlason	1,312	33%	
Majority		1,350		
Registered electors		8,905		
Turnout		3,974	45%	
Conservative hold		Swing		

=== Sefton Park West ===
No. 16 Sefton Park West
Party	Candidate	Votes	%	±%
Conservative	Miss Mabel Fletcher *	Unopposed	N/A	N/A
Registered electors				
Conservative hold				

=== South Scotland ===
No. 3 South Scotland
Party	Candidate	Votes	%	±%
Labour	Jeremiah O'Donoghue	2,419	57%	
Irish Nationalist	Patrick Jeremiah Kelly *	1,832	43%	
Majority		587		
Registered electors		8,360		
Turnout		4,251	51%	
Labour gain from Irish Nationalist		Swing		

=== Vauxhall ===
No. 4 Vauxhall
Party	Candidate	Votes	%	±%
Irish Nationalist	Joseph Belger *	1,200	74%	
Labour	Richard McCann	422	26%	
Majority		778		
Registered electors		3,821		
Turnout		4,251	42%	
Irish Nationalist hold		Swing		

=== Walton ===
No. 25 Walton
Party	Candidate	Votes	%	±%
Conservative	James Conrad Cross *	unopposed		
Registered electors				
Conservative hold		Swing		

=== Warbreck ===
No. 26 Warbreck
Party	Candidate	Votes	%	±%
Liberal	Edward West *	unopposed		
Registered electors				
Liberal gain from National Liberal		Swing		

=== Wavertree ===
No. 34 Wavertree
Party	Candidate	Votes	%	±%
Liberal	John Morris Griffith *	2,556	67%	
Labour	Arthur Charles Crosby	1,287	33%	
Majority		1,269		
Registered electors		11,070		
Turnout		3,843	35%	
Liberal hold		Swing		

=== Wavertree West ===
No. 33 Wavertree West
Party	Candidate	Votes	%	±%
Conservative	Charles Henry Barker *	2,095	47%	
Labour	Herbert Edward Rose	1,365	31%	
Liberal	John Richard Hobhouse	1,009	23%	
Majority		730		
Registered electors		8,625		
Turnout		4,469	52%	
Conservative hold		Swing		

=== West Derby ===
No. 28 West Derby
Party	Candidate	Votes	%	±%
Conservative	John Hickman Dovener *	4,079	64%	
Labour	George Henry Boothman	1,285	20%	
Liberal	Samuel Skelton jun.	1,015	16%	
Majority		2,794		
Registered electors		13,800		
Turnout		6,379	46%	
Conservative hold		Swing		

== Aldermanic Elections ==
=== Aldermanic Election 10 November 1924 ===
Caused by the death of Alderman William Boote (Conservative, last elected as an alderman on 9 November 1920) on 8 December 1923

In his place Councillor Henry Alexander Cole JP (Conservative, St. Peter's, elected 1 November 1922) of "The Homestead", Vyner Road, Bidston, Cheshire, was elected as an alderman by the councillors on 10 November 1924

Party	Alderman	Ward	Term expires
Conservative	Henry Alexander Cole JP		1926

=== Aldermanic Election for No. 35 Allerton 10 November 1924 ===
Pursuant of sub-section (4) of section 18 of the Liverpool Corporation Act 1921 (11 & 12 Geo. 5. c. lxxiv), Councillor Henry Morley Miller (Conservative, Aigurth, elected 1 November 1922) of 2 Riverside Road, Aigburth, Liverpool, was elected as an alderman by the councillors on 10 November 1924

Party	Alderman	Ward	Term expires
Conservative	Henry Morley Miller	No. 35 Allerton	1930

=== Aldermanic Elections 3 June 1925 ===
Caused by the resignation of Alderman Frederick James Rawlinson (Conservative, last elected as an alderman on 9 November 1920) which was reported to the council on 6 May 1925.

In whose place Councillor Albert Edward Jacob MP (Unionist, Aigburth, elected 1 November 1923) was elected as an alderman by the council on 3 June 1925.

Party	Alderman	Ward	Term expires
Unionist	Albert Edward Jacob MP	No. 5 Exchange	1926

Caused by the death of Alderman Joseph Harrison Jones (Liberal, elected as an alderman on 9 November 1920) on 21 November 1924.

In whose place Councillor Herber Reynolds Rathbone (Liberal, Sefton Park West, last elected 1 November 1922) on 3 June 1925

Party	Alderman	Ward	Term expires
Liberal	Herber Reynolds Rathbone		1926

=== Aldermanic Election 1 July 1925 ===
Caused by the death of alderman John Gregory Taggart (Irish Nationalist, last elected as an alderman on 9 November 1923), in whose place Councillor John Clancy (Irish Nationalist, North Scotland, elected 1 November 1922) was elected by the councillors as an alderman on 1 July 1925.

Party	Alderman	Ward	Term expires
Irish Nationalist	John Clancy		1929

== By-elections ==
=== No. 8 St. Peter's 20 November 1924 ===
Caused by the election as an alderman of Councillor Henry Alexander Cole JP (Conservative, St. Peter's, elected 1 November 1922) on 10 November 1924, following the death of Alderman William Boote (Conservative, last elected as an alderman on 9 November 1920) on 8 December 1923 .

No. 8 St. Peter's 20 November 1924
Party	Candidate	Votes	%	±%
Conservative	Herbert Wolfe Levy	695	51%	
Independent	Frederick Bowman	369	27%	
	Charles Wilson	286	21%	
Majority		613		
Registered electors		2,892		
Turnout		1,350	47%	
Conservative hold		Swing		

The term of office to expire on 1 November 1925.

=== No. 35 Aigburth, 28 November 1924 ===
Caused by the election as an alderman of Councillor Henry Morley Miller (Conservative, Aigurth, elected 1 November 1922) on 10 November 1924

No. 17 Aigburth 28 November 1924
Party	Candidate	Votes	%	±%
Conservative	Wilfrid Bowring Stoddart	unopposed		
Registered electors				
Conservative hold		Swing		

The term of office to expire on 1 November 1925.

=== No. 31 Fairfield, 15 December 1924 ===
Caused by the death of Councillor James Hughes (National Liberal, Fairfield, elected 1 November 1923) on 21 November 1924

No. 31 Fairfield 15 December 1924
Party	Candidate	Votes	%	±%
Conservative	John Barry	1,842	56%	
Liberal	John Richard Hobhouse	1,432	44%	
Majority		410		
Registered electors				
Turnout		3,274		
Conservative gain from National Liberal		Swing		

The term of office to expire on 1 November 1926.

=== No. 20 Low Hill, 19 February 1925 ===
Caused by the death of Councillor Ellis Keyser Yates (Conservative, Low Hill, elected 1 November 1922) on 29 January 1925 .

No. 20 Low Hill 19 February 1925
Party	Candidate	Votes	%	±%
Conservative	Robert Edward Bibby Tevor	1,948	51%	
Labour	Fred Robinson	1,886	49%	
Majority		62		
Registered electors		10,268		
Turnout		3,834	37%	
Conservative hold		Swing		

The term of office to end on 1 November 1925.

=== No. 17 Aigburth, 23 June 1925 ===
Caused by the election as an alderman of Councillor Albert Edward Jacob MP (Unionist, Aigburth, elected 1 November 1923) who was elected as an alderman by the council on 3 June 1925, following the resignation of Alderman Frederick James Rawlinson (Conservative, last elected as an alderman on 9 November 1920) which was reported to the council on 6 May 1925.

No. 17 Aigburth 23 June 1925
Party	Candidate	Votes	%	±%
Conservative	William Stanley Metcalfe	unopposed		
Registered electors				
Conservative gain from Unionist		Swing		

The term of office to end on 1 November 1926.

=== No. 2 North Scotland, 8 August 1925 ===
Caused by the election by the councillors as an alderman of Councillor John Clancy (Irish Nationalist, North Scotland, elected 1 November 1922) on 1 July 1925, following the death of alderman John Gregory Taggart (Irish Nationalist, last elected as an alderman on 9 November 1923).

No. 2 North Scotland 8 August 1925
Party	Candidate	Votes	%	±%
Labour	Richard McCann	1,850	66%	
Irish Nationalist	Fredrick William Tucker	935	34%	
Majority		915		
Registered electors		8,178		
Turnout		2,785	34%	
Labour gain from Irish Nationalist		Swing		

== Mersey Tunnel Referendum 7 May 1925 ==
The following resolution was put to a poll of the Electors on 7 May 1925 :

"That the Electors of the City of Liverpool hereby consent to the promotion of the Bill intituled 'An Act to authorise the construction of a Tunnel under the River Mersey between Liverpool and Birkenhead; and for other purposes.'"

Mersey Tunnel Poll	Votes	%
For the Resolution	79,906	92%
Against the Resolution	6,937	8%
Majority	72,969	
Number of Electors	315,859	
Turnout	86,843	27%

== See also ==
- Liverpool City Council
- Liverpool Town Council elections 1835 - 1879
- Liverpool City Council elections 1880–present
- Mayors and Lord Mayors of Liverpool 1207 to present
- History of local government in England
