= 1928 Liverpool City Council election =

1928 English local government election

- 1 November 1928

39 councillors' seats were up for election

Elections to Liverpool City Council were held on 1 November 1928.

One third of the council seats were up for election. The term of office for each councillor being three years.

Thirteen of the thirty-nine seats up for election were uncontested.

After the election, the composition of the council was:

Party	Councillors	±	Aldermen	Total
Conservative	61	??	26	87
Labour	35	??	1	36
Centre	10	??	5	15
Liberal	8	??	4	12

== Election result ==
Liverpool local election result 1928
Party	Seats	Gains	Losses	Net gain/loss	Seats %	Votes %	Votes	+/−
Conservative	21							
Labour	15							
Liberal	2							
Centre	1							
Protestant	0	0	1	-1				
Communist								

== Ward results ==
* - Councillor seeking re-election

Comparisons are made with the 1925 election results.

=== Abercromby ===
No. 9 Abercromby
Party	Candidate	Votes	%	±%
Conservative	Edwin Thompson *	unopposed		
Registered electors				
Conservative hold		Swing		

=== Aigburth ===
No. 17 Aigburth
Party	Candidate	Votes	%	±%
Conservative	Wilfred Bowring Stoddart *	unopposed		
Registered electors				
Conservative hold		Swing		

=== Allerton ===
No. 35 Allerton
Party	Candidate	Votes	%	±%
Conservative	Mrs. Gertrude Elizabeth Wilson *	1,130	72%	
Labour	Thomas Crossland	445	28%	
Majority		685		
Registered electors		3,359		
Turnout		1,575	47%	
Conservative gain from Independent		Swing		

=== Anfield ===
No. 29 Anfield
Party	Candidate	Votes	%	±%
Conservative	George Young Williamson *	2,233	42%	
Liberal	Dr. Cedric Baxter	1,863	35%	
Labour	John Sheehan	1,206	23%	
Majority		370		
Registered electors		10,088		
Turnout		5,302	53%	
Conservative hold		Swing		

=== Breckfield ===
No. 30 Breckfield
Party	Candidate	Votes	%	±%
Conservative	Edward James Jones *	2,491	51%	
Labour	William James Riddick	2,368	49%	
Majority		123		
Registered electors		9,405		
Turnout		4,859	52%	
Conservative hold		Swing		

=== Brunswick ===
No. 11 Brunswick
Party	Candidate	Votes	%	±%
Labour	Patrick Moorhead	3,111	81%	
Centre	John Alfred Kelly *	740	19%	
Majority		2,371		
Registered electors		8,447		
Turnout		3,851	46%	
Labour gain from Catholic		Swing		

=== Castle Street ===
No. 7 Castle Street
Party	Candidate	Votes	%	±%
Conservative	Sir John Sandeman Allen MP *	Unopposed	N/A	N/A
Registered electors				
Conservative hold				

=== Childwall ===
No. 38 Childwall
Party	Candidate	Votes	%	±%
Conservative	Lt. Col. Edmund Percy Johnson	972	63%	
Labour	Mrs. Mary Lilian Hamilton	570	37%	
Majority		402		
Registered electors		2,525		
Turnout		1,542	61%	
Conservative win (new seat)				

=== Croxteth ===
The proceedings of the Council lists this as a by-election caused by the death of Councillor John Ellis.

No. 40 Croxteth
Party	Candidate	Votes	%	±%
Labour	Alfred Hargreaves	1,925	62%	
Conservative	William Edward McLachlan	1,157	38%	
Majority		1,925		
Registered electors		5,886		
Turnout		3,082	52%	
Labour win (new seat)				

=== Dingle ===
No. 12 Dingle
Party	Candidate	Votes	%	±%
Conservative	William Wallace Kelly *	4,696	51%	
Labour	William Jones	4,560	49%	
Majority		136		
Registered electors		14,084		
Turnout		9,256	66%	
Conservative hold		Swing		

=== Edge Hill ===
No. 18 Edge Hill
Party	Candidate	Votes	%	±%
Labour	Charles Wilson *	3,314	59%	
Conservative	Edward Cheshire	2,172	39%	
Communist	Leo Joseph McGree	155	3%	
Majority		1,142		
Registered electors		12,188		
Turnout		5,641	46%	
Labour hold		Swing		

=== Everton ===
No. 21 Everton
Party	Candidate	Votes	%	±%
Labour	Henry Walker *	4,278	67%	
Conservative	William John Lunt Croft	2,153	33%	
Majority		2,125		
Registered electors		12,194		
Turnout		6,431	53%	
Labour hold		Swing		

=== Exchange ===
No. 5 Exchange
Party	Candidate	Votes	%	±%
Catholic	Peter Kavanagh *	unopposed		
Registered electors				
Catholic hold		Swing		

=== Fairfield ===
No. 31 Fairfield
Party	Candidate	Votes	%	±%
Conservative	Charles Gordon Snowden Gordon	2,043	49%	
Labour	Victor Harold Edgar Baker	1,659	33%	
Liberal	Alan Anderson Boyle	1,392	27%	
Majority		384		
Registered electors		9,233		
Turnout		5,094	55%	
Conservative hold		Swing		

=== Fazakerley ===
No. 27 Fazakerley
Party	Candidate	Votes	%	±%
Labour	Francis Bernard Fitzpatrick	1,699	51%	
Conservative	Francis Samuel Henwood Ashcroft *	1,659	49%	
Majority		40		
Registered electors		7,324		
Turnout		3,358	46%	
Labour gain from Conservative		Swing		

=== Garston ===
No. 37 Garston
Party	Candidate	Votes	%	±%
Conservative	Joseph Williams	2,208	49%	
Labour	William Sydney Dytor	2,038	45%	
Liberal	Joseph Fry	259	6%	
Majority		170		
Registered electors		6,421		
Turnout		4,505	70%	
Conservative hold		Swing		

=== Granby ===
No. 14 Granby
Party	Candidate	Votes	%	±%
Liberal	Sir Frederick Charles Bowring *	2,743	59%	
Labour	George Henry Boothman	1,886	41%	
Majority		857		
Registered electors		9,132		
Turnout		4,629	51%	
Liberal hold		Swing		

=== Great George ===
No. 10 Great George
Party	Candidate	Votes	%	±%
	Harry Leo Gaffeney	unopposed		
Registered electors				
		Swing		

=== Kensington ===
No. 19 Kensington
Party	Candidate	Votes	%	±%
Conservative	Sir John Hugo Rutherford *	3,347	55%	
Labour	George Edwin Swift	2,697	45%	
Majority		650	10%	
Registered electors		10,641		
Turnout		6,044	57%	
Conservative hold		Swing		

=== Kirkdale ===
No. 24 Kirkdale
Party	Candidate	Votes	%	±%
Labour	Robert Joseph MacDonnell	4,120	51%	
Conservative	Robert Garnett Sheldon *	4,008	49%	
Majority		112		
Registered electors		15,321		
Turnout		8,128	53%	
Labour gain from Conservative		Swing		

=== Little Woolton ===
No. 39 Little Woolton
Party	Candidate	Votes	%	±%
Conservative	Rupert Henry Bremner *	unopposed		
Registered electors				
Conservative hold		Swing		

=== Low Hill ===
No. 20 Low Hill
Party	Candidate	Votes	%	±%
Labour	Fred Robinson *	2,926	60%	
Conservative	Edward Joseph Gearing	1,917	40%	
Majority		1,009		
Registered electors		10,095		
Turnout		4,843	48%	
Labour hold		Swing		

=== Netherfield ===
No. 22 Netherfield
Party	Candidate	Votes	%	±%
Labour	John Bagot	3,150	52%	
Protestant	John Walker *	2,864	48%	
Majority		286		
Registered electors		11,178		
Turnout		6,014	54%	
Labour gain from Protestant		Swing		

=== North Scotland ===
No. 2 North Scotland
Party	Candidate	Votes	%	±%
Labour	Patrick Fay	unopposed		
Registered electors				
Labour gain from Catholic		Swing		

=== Old Swan ===
No. 32 Old Swan
Party	Candidate	Votes	%	±%
Conservative	John Waterworth *	3,112	51%	
Labour	Mrs. Sarah Anne McArd	3,023	49%	
Majority		89		
Registered electors		13,273		
Turnout		6,135	46%	
Conservative hold		Swing		

=== Prince's Park ===
No. 13 Prince's Park
Party	Candidate	Votes	%	±%
Conservative	Joseph Davies Griffiths	2,671	55%	
Labour	Robert Edwards	2,198	45%	
Majority		473		
Registered electors		9,094		
Turnout		4,869	54%	
Conservative hold		Swing		

=== Sandhills ===
No. 1 Sandhills
Party	Candidate	Votes	%	±%
Labour	Thomas Wafer Byrne *	unopposed		
Registered electors				
Labour hold		Swing		

=== St. Anne's ===
No. 6 St. Anne's
Party	Candidate	Votes	%	±%
Labour	John David Mack	unopposed		
Registered electors				
Labour gain from Catholic		Swing		

=== St. Domingo ===
No. 23 St. Domingo
Party	Candidate	Votes	%	±%
Conservative	Sir Thomas White *	3,044	53%	
Labour	William Henry Barton	2,699	47%	
Majority		345		
Registered electors		10,805		
Turnout		5,743	53%	
Conservative hold		Swing		

=== St. Peter's ===
No. 8 St. Peter's
Party	Candidate	Votes	%	±%
Conservative	Herbert Wolfe Levy *	631	50%	
Labour	George William Hincks	628	50%	
Majority		3		
Registered electors		2,778		
Turnout		1,259	45%	
Conservative hold		Swing		

=== Sefton Park East ===
No. 15 Sefton Park East
Party	Candidate	Votes	%	±%
Conservative	Sir Arnold Rushton *	unopposed		
Registered electors				
Conservative hold		Swing		

=== Sefton Park West ===
No. 16 Sefton Park West
Party	Candidate	Votes	%	±%
Conservative	James Graham Reece *	2,375	75%	
Labour	Mrs. Gertrude Annie Cole	784	25%	
Majority		1,591		
Registered electors		5,984		
Turnout		3,159	53%	
Conservative hold		Swing		

=== South Scotland ===
No. 3 South Scotland
Party	Candidate	Votes	%	±%
Labour	Joseph Harrington	unopposed		
Registered electors				
Labour gain from Catholic		Swing		

=== Vauxhall ===
No. 4 Vauxhall
Party	Candidate	Votes	%	±%
Labour	Arthur Brian Hoer	unopposed		
Registered electors				
Labour gain from Catholic				

=== Walton ===
No. 25 Walton
Party	Candidate	Votes	%	±%
Conservative	William Swift *	3,845	56%	
Labour	Richard Thomas Hughes	2,977	44%	
Majority		868		
Registered electors		15,282		
Turnout		6,822	45%	
Conservative hold		Swing		

=== Warbreck ===
No. 26 Warbreck
Party	Candidate	Votes	%	±%
Conservative	Alexander Critchley *	unopposed		
Registered electors				
Conservative hold		Swing		

=== Wavertree ===
No. 34 Wavertree
Party	Candidate	Votes	%	±%
Conservative	Henry Shuttleworth	2,852	44%	
Labour	Peter Leslie Duncan	1,823	28%	
Liberal	John Richard Jones	1,737	27%	
Majority		1,029		
Registered electors		13,247		
Turnout		6,412	48%	
Conservative hold		Swing		

=== Wavertree West ===
No. 33 Wavertree West
Party	Candidate	Votes	%	±%
Labour	Charles Matthew Belk	2,097	42%	
Conservative	William Adam Edwards	1,782	36%	
Liberal	William John Tristram	1,136	23%	
Majority		315		
Registered electors		8,325		
Turnout		5,015	60%	
Labour gain from Conservative		Swing		

=== West Derby ===
No. 28 West Derby
Party	Candidate	Votes	%	±%
Conservative	Robert Duncan French *	4,182	61%	
Labour	James Blundell	2,645	39%	
Majority		1,536		
Registered electors		16,297		
Turnout		6,828	42%	
Conservative hold		Swing		

== Aldermanic Elections ==
=== Aldermanic Elections 5 December 1928 ===
Following the death on 23 March 1928 of Alderman Sir William Bower Forwood KBE DL (Conservative, last elected as an alderman on 9 November 1923), a poll of councillors was taken to elect his successor. Councillor Edwin Haigh (Conservative, Wavertree West, elected 1 November 1926) of San Rocque, Calderstones Road, Liverpool was elected as an alderman.

Aldermanic Election 5 December 1928
Party	Name	Votes	Percentage
Conservative	Councillor Edwin Haigh	53	63%
Labour	Councillor James Sexton CBE MP	31	27%

The term of office to expire on 9 November 1929.

Following the death of Alderman Jacob Reuben Grant (Liberal, last elected as an alderman on 9 November 1926), a poll of councillors was taken to elect his successor. Councillor Richard Rutherford JP (Party?, Castle Street, elected 1 November 1926) of 16 School Lane, Bidston, Birkenhead was elected as an alderman on 5 December 1928

Aldermanic Election 5 December 1928
Party	Name	Votes	Percentage
	Councillor Richard Rutherford	52	62%
Labour	Councillor William Albert Robinson	32	28%

The term of office to expire on 9 November 1932.

=== Aldermanic Elections 6 March 1929 ===
Following the death on 11 December 1928 of Alderman The Right Honourable Sir Archibald Tutton Salvidge PC KBE LL.D. (Conservative, last elected as an alderman on 9 November 1926)

In his place Councillor Edwin Thompson (Conservative Abercromby, elected 1 November 1928), Manufacturing Chemist of 6 Livingston Drive North, Liverpool was elected as an alderman on 6 March 1929.

Aldermanic Election 6 March 1929
Party	Name	Votes	Percentage
Conservative	Councillor Edwin Thompson	52	60%
Labour	Councillor James Sexton CBE MP	35	40%

The term of office to expire on 9 November 1932.

Following the death on 19 December 1928 of Alderman John Edwards (Conservative, last elected as an alderman on 9 November 1923)

In his place Councillor Joseph Ashworth (Conservative, Kensington, elected 1 November 1926), builder and contractor of 30 Holt Road, Liverpool was elected in a poll of councillors as an alderman on 6 March 1929

Aldermanic Election 6 March 1929
Party	Name	Votes	Percentage
Conservative	Councillor Joseph Ashworth	51	59%
Labour	Councillor William Albert Robinson	36	41%

The term of office to expire on 9 November 1929.

Following the death on 15 January 1929 of Alderman Arthur Stanley Mather CBE (Conservative, last elected as an alderman on 9 November 1923)

In whose place Councillor Herbert John Davis (Conservative, Childwall, elected 1 November 1927), solicitor of 11 Aigburth Drive, Liverpool was elected as an alderman in a poll of the councillors on 6 March 1929.

Aldermanic Election 6 March 1929
Party	Name	Votes	Percentage
Conservative	Councillor Herbert John Davis	51	59%
Labour	Councillor Thomas Wafer Byrne	35	41%

The term of office to expire on 9 November 1929.

Caused by the death on 29 January 1929 of Alderman William James Burgess (Conservative, last elected as an alderman on 9 November 1923).

In whose place Councillor Henry Langton Beckwith (Conservative, Wavertree, elected 1 November 1926), Architect and Surveyor of 4 Aigbirth Drive, Liverpool was elected as an alderman in a poll of the councillors on 6 March 1929

Aldermanic Election 6 March 1929
Party	Name	Votes	Percentage
Conservative	Councillor Henry Langton Beckwith	51	59%
Labour	Councillor Frederick Thomas Richardson	35	41%

The term of office to expire on 9 November 1929.

=== Aldermanic Election 4 September 1929 ===
Caused by the death on 26 February 1929 of Alderman Albert Edward Jacob MP (Unionist, last elected as an alderman on 9 November 1926), in whose place Councillor Joseph Dalton Flood JP (Conservative, Dingle, last elected 1 November 1926), of 643 Borough Road, Birkenhead, being elected as an alderman in a poll of councillors on 4 September 1929.

Aldermanic Election 4 September 1929
Party	Name	Votes	Percentage
Conservative	Councillor Joseph Dalton Flood	46	57%
Labour	Councillor James Sexton CBE MP	35	43%

The term of office to expire on 9 November 1932.

=== Aldermanic Election 23 October 1929 ===
Caused by the resignation of Alderman Edward West (Liberal, elected as an alderman on 2 March 1927 which was reported to the council on 2 October 1929, in whose place Councillor William Wallace Kelly JP (Conservative, Dingle, last elected 1 November 1928) of the North Western Hotel, Liverpool was elected as an alderman in a poll of the councillors on 23 October 1929.

Aldermanic Election 4 September 1929
Party	Name	Votes	Percentage
Conservative	Councillor William Wallace Kelly	51	55%
Labour	Councillor James Sexton CBE MP	41	45%

The term of office to expire on 9 November 1932.

== By-elections ==
=== No. 10 Great George, 3 December 1928 ===
Caused by the death of Councillor William Grogan (Catholic, Great George, elected 1 November 1926).

No. 10 Great George
Party	Candidate	Votes	%	±%
Catholic	Matthew Grogan	905	54%	
	John Coburne	756	46%	
Majority		149		
Registered electors				
Turnout		1,661		
Catholic hold		Swing		

=== No. 33 Wavertree West, 17 December 1928 ===
Caused by Councillor Edwin Haigh (Conservative, Wavertree West, elected 1 November 1926) being elected as an alderman on 5 December 1928, following the death on 23 March 1928 of Alderman Sir William Bower Forwood KBE DL.

No. 33 Wavertree West 17 December 1928
Party	Candidate	Votes	%	±%
Labour	Caroline Whiteley	1,571	43%	
	William Adam Edwards	1,395	39%	
	William John Tristram	647	18%	
Majority		176		
Registered electors		8,325		
Turnout		3,613	43%	
Labour gain from Conservative		Swing		

The term of office to expire on 1 November 1929.

=== No. 7 Castle Street, 20 December 1928 ===
Caused by the election as an alderman on 5 December 1928 of Councillor Richard Rutherford JP (Party?, Castle Street, elected 1 November 1926), following the death of Alderman Jacob Reuben Grant (Liberal, last elected as an alderman on 9 November 1926). Robert Garnett Sheldon, physician and surgeon of "Redholme", Victoria Road, Freshfield was the sole candidate.

No. 7 Castle Street 20 December 1928
Party	Candidate	Votes	%	±%
	Robert Garnett Sheldon	unopposed		
Registered electors				
		Swing		

The term of office to expire on 1 November 1929.

=== No. 26 West Derby, 29 January 1929 ===
Caused by the death on 6 December 1928 of Councillor John Hickman Dovener (Conservative, West Derby, elected 1 November 1927)

No. 28 West Derby 29 January 1929
Party	Candidate	Votes	%	±%
Conservative	John Reginald Dovener	2,229	67%	
	John Sheehan	1,105	33%	
Majority		1,124		
Registered electors		16,297		
Turnout		3,334	20%	
Conservative hold		Swing		

The term of office to expire on 1 November 1930.

=== No. 3 South Scotland, 28 February 1929 ===
Caused by the death on 24 January 1929 of Councillor Mary O'Shea (Catholic, South Scotland, elected 1 November 1927). Michael John Reppion, Carting Agent of 11 Lowerson Crescent, West Derny, Liverpool was the sole candidate.

No. 3 South Scotland 28 February 1929
Party	Candidate	Votes	%	±%
Labour	Michael John Reppion	unopposed		
Registered electors				
Labour gain from Catholic		Swing		

The term of office to expire on 1 November 1930.

=== No. 9 Abercromby, 16 April 1929 ===
Caused by Councillor Edwin Thompson (Conservative Abercromby, elected 1 November 1928), being elected as an alderman on 6 March 1929.

Following the death on 11 December 1928 of Alderman The Right Honourable Sir Archibald Tutton Salvidge PC KBE LL.D. (Conservative, last elected as an alderman on 9 November 1926).

No. 9 Abercromby 16 April 1929
Party	Candidate	Votes	%	±%
Conservative	Gifford William Ollason	1,507	56%	
Labour	Bernard Louis Myer	1,187	44%	
Majority		320	12%	
Registered electors				
Turnout		2,694		
Conservative hold		Swing		

The term of office to expire on 1 November 1931

=== No. 19 Kensington, 16 April 1929 ===
Caused by Councillor Joseph Ashworth (Conservative, Kensington, elected 1 November 1926), being elected in a poll of councillors as am alderman on 6 March 1929.

Following the death on 19 December 1928 of Alderman John Edwards (Conservative, last elected as an alderman on 9 November 1923).

Thomas Norman Jones, a solicitor of the Supreme Court of Judicature of 59 Marlowe Road, Wallasey, Cheshire was elected as a councillor for the Kensington ward

No. 19 Kensington 16 April 1929
Party	Candidate	Votes	%	±%
Conservative	Thomas Norman Jones	2,259	53%	
Labour	George Edwin Swift	2,041	47%	
Majority		218		
Registered electors		10,641		
Turnout		4,300	40%	
Conservative hold		Swing		

The term of office to expire on 1 November 1931

=== No. 34 Wavertree, 18 April 1929 ===
Caused by Councillor Henry Langton Beckwith (Conservative, Wavertree, elected 1 November 1926) being elected as an alderman in a poll of the councillors on 6 March 1929, following the death on 29 January 1929 of Alderman William James Burgess (Conservative, last elected as an alderman on 9 November 1923).

No. 34 Wavertree 18 April 1929
Party	Candidate	Votes	%	±%
Labour	John Gibbon Elliott	1,655	34%	
Conservative	Henry Gibson Nash	1,607	33%	
Liberal	John Richard Hobhouse	1,537	32%	
Majority		48		
Registered electors		13,247		
Turnout		4,799	36%	
Labour gain from Conservative		Swing		

The term of office to expire on 1 November 1929.

=== No. 38 Childwall, 18 April 1929 ===
Caused by Councillor Herbert John Davis (Conservative, Childwall, elected 1 November 1927) being elected as an alderman in a poll of the councillors on 6 March 1929, following the death on 15 January 1929 of Alderman Arthur Stanley Mather CBE (Conservative, last elected as an alderman on 9 November 1923).

No. 38 Childwall 18 April 1929
Party	Candidate	Votes	%	±%
Liberal	Alan Anderson Boyle	621	45%	
	Gerald Howard Taylor	523	38%	
	Frederick Stapleton	225	16%	
Majority		98		
Registered electors		2,525		
Turnout		1,369	54%	
Liberal gain from Conservative		Swing		

The term of office to expire on 1 November 1930.

=== No. 12 Dingle, 24 September 1929 ===
Caused by Councillor Joseph Dalton Flood (Conservative, Dingle, last elected 1 November 1926) being elected as an alderman in a poll of councillors on 4 September 1929, following the death on 26 February 1929 of Alderman Albert Edward Jacob MP (Unionist, last elected as an alderman on 9 November 1926)

No. 12 Dingle 24 September 1924
Party	Candidate	Votes	%	±%
Labour	William Jones	unopposed		
Registered electors		14,084		
Labour gain from Conservative		Swing		

The term of office to expire on 1 November 1929.

== See also ==
- Liverpool City Council
- Liverpool Town Council elections 1835 - 1879
- Liverpool City Council elections 1880–present
- Mayors and Lord Mayors of Liverpool 1207 to present
- History of local government in England
