= Catholic Party =

Catholic Party may refer to:

- Catholic Party (Belgium)
- Catholic Party (Indonesia)
- Catholic Party (Liverpool)

== See also ==
- Category:Catholic political parties
