= Catholic Party (Liverpool) =

- Dissolved: 1929
- Preceded by: Irish Nationalist Party
- Succeeded by: Centre Party
- Headquarters: Liverpool, United Kingdom
- Ideology: Irish minority interests Christian democracy Social Catholicism
- Religion: Catholicism
- Colors: Green

The Catholic Party was founded in Liverpool in 1925 from the Irish Nationalist Party's Liverpool section following the establishment of the Irish Free State and its separation from the United Kingdom. It represented the interests of the Irish population.

The Catholic Party stood candidates in Liverpool City Council elections from 1925 to 1929; thereafter it became the Centre Party.

Election	Leader	Vote %	Seats	Council administration
1925	—	7.3	22 / 151	Conservative
1926	—	7.5	20 / 151	Conservative
1927	—		21 / 151	Conservative
1928	—		15 / 151	Conservative

== See also ==
- Liverpool City Council
- Liverpool City Council elections 1880–present
