= Archibald Salvidge =

British politician from Liverpool (1863–1928)

The Right Honourable Sir Archibald Salvidge KBE

Personal details
- Born: 1863 Birkenhead. Cheshire
- Died: 11 December 1928 (aged 65)
- Party: Conservative

Sir Archibald Tutton James Salvidge KBE PC (5 August 1863 – 11 December 1928) was an English politician, most notable for securing the political dominance of the Conservative Party in Liverpool through the use of the Working Men's Conservative Association (WMCA), earning him the nickname "the king of Liverpool" (by Warden Chilcott, MP for Liverpool Walton). Salvidge was not a member of the Orange Order but he claimed on the Glorious Twelfth of July 1891 that his principles and the Orangemen's were one and the same due to the WMCA's requiring members "to be a sound Protestant". Due to the high Irish immigration into Liverpool and the widespread sectarianism in the city, Salvidge managed to galvanise Liverpool's Protestant population behind the Conservative Party in their opposition to Irish Home Rule.
