= Low Hill (Liverpool ward) =

Former metropolitan borough council ward in England

- Low Hill ward within Liverpool
- Metropolitan borough: City of Liverpool
- Metropolitan county: Merseyside
- Region: North West
- Country: England
- Sovereign state: United Kingdom
- UK Parliament: Liverpool Abercromby (1895–1918)); Liverpool Edge Hill (1918–1955)); Liverpool Exchange (1955–1973)

Low Hill ward was an electoral district of Liverpool City Council. The ward was part of what is now the eastern edge of Liverpool City Centre and the Kensington district of Liverpool.

== Background ==
The ward was created in 1895 to accommodate the expanding city. It was reformed in 1953 and was merged with Smithdown ward in 1973.

=== 1895 boundaries ===
The ward was extracted from West Derby ward and was part of the Liverpool Abercromby Parliamentary constituency. On the re-arrangement of Parliamentary constituencies for the 1918 General Election Low Hill ward became part of the Liverpool Edge Hill constituency.

=== 1953 boundaries ===
Liverpool City Council ward boundaries were changed prior to the 1953 election; the boundaries of Low Hill ward were largely unchanged. From 1955 the ward was a constituent part of the Liverpool Exchange constituency.

=== 1973 election ===
Following the Local Government Act 1972 the ward boundaries of the council were altered. The number of wards was reduced from 40 to 33 and the aldermanic system was abolished. Low Hill ward was merged with Smithdown ward to form Low Hill, Smithdown ward.

== Councillors ==
Election	Councillor	Councillor	Councillor
1895	Charles Dean (Con)	Charles Petrie (Con)	Ephraim Walker (Con)
1895	Charles Dean (Con)	Charles Petrie (Con)	George Jones (Con)^{[a]}
1896	Archibald Salvidge (Con)^{[b]}	Charles Petrie (Con)	George Jones (Con)
1896	Charles Dean (Con)	Charles Petrie (Con)	George Jones (Con)
1897	Charles Dean (Con)^{[c]}	Charles Petrie (Con)	George Jones (Con)
1898	Charles Dean (Con)	Charles Petrie (Con)	George Jones (Con)
1899	Charles Dean (Con)	Charles Petrie (Con)	George Jones (Con)
1900	Charles Dean (Con)	David McNeight (Con)	George Jones (Con)
1901	Joseph Roby (Con)^{[d]}	David McNeight (Con)	George Jones (Con)
1902	Joseph Roby (Con)	David McNeight (Con)	George Jones (Con)
1903	Joseph Roby (Con)	David McNeight (Con)	George Jones (Con)
1904	Joseph Roby (Con)	David McNeight (Con)	William Boote (Con)
1905	John McEvoy (Lib)	David McNeight (Con)	William Boote (Con)
1906	John McEvoy (Lib)	Anthony Shelerdine (Con)	William Boote (Con)
1907	David Pearson (Con)^{[e]}	Anthony Shelerdine (Con)	William Boote (Con)
1908	David Pearson (Con)^{[e]}	Anthony Shelerdine (Con)	William Boote (Con)
1909	David Pearson (Con)^{[e]}	Anthony Shelerdine (Con)	William Boote (Con)
1910	David Pearson (Con)^{[e]}	Francis Bailey (Con)^{[f]}	William Boote (Con)
1911–1973

indicates seat up for re-election after boundary changes.

indicates seat up for re-election.

indicates change in affiliation.

indicates seat up for re-election after casual vacancy.

=== Notes ===
a. Cllr Epphraim Walker (Conservative, 1896) was elected as an alderman on 9 November 1895 and vacated his seat as a councillor; a by-election was held.

b. Cllr Charles Dean (Conservative, 1895) resigned from the council on 4 March 1896. A by-election was held on 15 March 1896.

c. The election of Cllr Charles Dean (Conservative, 1896) was declared void following a petition. A by-election was held on 16 March 1897.

d. Cllr Charles Dean (Conservative, 1899) resigned from the Council on 6 February 1901. A by-election was held on 28 February 1901.

e. Cllr John McEvoy (Liberal, 1905) resigned from the Council on 1 April 1907. A by-election was held on 15 April 1907.

f. Cllr Anthony Shelmerdine (Conservative, 1909) was elected as alderman on 9 November 1910 and vacated his seat as a councillor. A by-election was held on 24 November 1910.
