= South Scotland (Liverpool ward) =

Coordinates: 53.4098°N 2.9776°W

South Scotland Ward
- Former ward
- Location within Merseyside
- OS grid reference: SJ345905
  - London: 178 mi (286 km) South
- Metropolitan borough: City of Liverpool
- Metropolitan county: Merseyside
- Region: North West
- Country: England
- Sovereign state: United Kingdom
- Post town: LIVERPOOL
- Postcode district: L3, L5
- Dialling code: 0151
- Police: Merseyside
- Fire: Merseyside
- Ambulance: North West
- UK Parliament: Liverpool Scotland

South Scotland is a defunct Liverpool electoral ward. It was created in the late 19th century following the division of the original Scotland ward and existed until the 20th century.

== History ==
The original Scotland ward was one of the sixteen original wards created under the Municipal Corporations Act 1835. Following boundary revisions in 1895, the Scotland ward was split into two separate entities: North Scotland and South Scotland.

South Scotland ward was located in the northern docklands area of Liverpool. While no specific street boundaries are provided in available sources, the area fell within the Scotland Road district, a densely populated working-class area with strong Irish heritage. In local government, South Scotland elected councillors to Liverpool City Council.

The ward was used as a component of the Liverpool Scotland parliamentary constituency. Under the boundary revisions of 1918, the constituency comprised the County Borough of Liverpool wards of North Scotland, Sandhills, and South Scotland, along with part of Vauxhall ward. This configuration remained until 1950, when the boundaries were redrawn to include Everton and other wards. South Scotland continued to form part of the parliamentary seat until the constituency was abolished in 1974.

The ward was eventually abolished in later boundary reorganisation, although specific dates of abolition are not recorded in available sources.

== Elections ==
=== 1914 ===
No. 8 South Scotland
Party	Candidate	Votes	%	±%
Irish Nationalist	Patrick Jeremiah Kelly *	unopposed		
Registered electors				
Irish Nationalist hold		Swing		

=== 1919 ===
No. 3 South Scotland
Party	Candidate	Votes	%	±%
Irish Nationalist	John O'Shea	unopposed		
Registered electors				
Irish Nationalist hold		Swing		

=== 1920 ===
No. 3 South Scotland
Party	Candidate	Votes	%	±%
Irish Nationalist	David Gilbert Logan	2,611	54%	
Labour	Henry Gaskin	2,252	46%	
Majority		359		
Registered electors		8,036		
Turnout		4,863	61%	
Irish Nationalist hold		Swing		

=== 1921 ===
No. 3 South Scotland
Party	Candidate	Votes	%	±%
Irish Nationalist	Patrick Jeremiah Kelly	unopposed		
Registered electors				
Irish Nationalist hold		Swing		

=== 1922 ===
The death of Councillor John O'Shea (Irish Nationalist, elected 1 November 1919) occurred on 28 October 1922, three days before his term of office was due to expire.

No. 3 South Scotland
Party	Candidate	Votes	%	±%
Irish Nationalist	Michael O'Mahony	2,540	50.4%	
Labour	Henry Gaskin	2,499	49.6%	
Majority		41		
Registered electors				
Turnout				
Irish Nationalist hold		Swing		

=== 1923 ===
No. 3 South Scotland
Party	Candidate	Votes	%	±%
Irish Nationalist	John Gerald Murphy	2,841	59%	
Labour	David Gilbert Logan *	2,014	41%	
Majority		827		
Registered electors		8,269		
Turnout		4,855	59%	
Irish Nationalist hold		Swing		

=== 1924 ===
No. 3 South Scotland
Party	Candidate	Votes	%	±%
Labour	Jeremiah O'Donoghue	2,419	57%	
Irish Nationalist	Patrick Jeremiah Kelly *	1,832	43%	
Majority		587		
Registered electors		8,360		
Turnout		4,251	51%	
Labour gain from Irish Nationalist		Swing		

=== 1925 ===
No. 3 South Scotland
Party	Candidate	Votes	%	±%
Catholic	Michael O'Mahony *	3,013	65%	
Labour	Edward Campbell	1,646	35%	
Majority		1,367		
Registered electors		8,468		
Turnout		4,659	55%	
Catholic gain from Irish Nationalist		Swing		

=== 1926 ===
No. 3 South Scotland
Party	Candidate	Votes	%	±%
Catholic	John Gerald Murphy *	1,673	52%	
Labour	Joseph Harrington	1,523	48%	
Majority		150		
Registered electors		8,544		
Turnout		3,196	37%	
Catholic gain from Irish Nationalist		Swing		

=== 1927 ===
No. 3 South Scotland
Party	Candidate	Votes	%	±%
Catholic	Mary O'Shea	2,767	59%	
Labour	Joseph Harrington	1,927	41%	
Majority		840		
Registered electors		8,437		
Turnout		4,694	56%	
Catholic gain from Labour		Swing		

=== 1928 ===
No. 3 South Scotland
Party	Candidate	Votes	%	±%
Labour	Joseph Harrington	unopposed		
Registered electors				
Labour gain from Catholic		Swing		

=== 1929 ===
No. 3 South Scotland
Party	Candidate	Votes	%	±%
Labour	John Sheehan	2,604	59%	
Centre	John Gerald Murphy	1,793	41%	
Majority		811	18%	N/A
Registered electors		9,235		
Turnout		4,397	48%	
Labour gain from Catholic		Swing		

=== 1930 ===
No. 3 South Scotland
Party	Candidate	Votes	%	±%
Labour	Michael John Reppion *	2,310	82%	
Independent	Patrick James Loughran	524	18%	
Majority		1,786		
Registered electors		8,830		
Turnout		2,834	32%	
Labour gain from Catholic		Swing		

=== 1931 ===
No. 3 South Scotland
Party	Candidate	Votes	%	±%
Labour	Joseph Harrington *	unopposed		
Registered electors				
Labour hold		Swing		

=== 1932 ===
No. 3 South Scotland
Party	Candidate	Votes	%	±%
Labour	John Sheehan	unopposed		
Registered electors				
Labour hold		Swing		

=== 1933 ===
No. 3 South Scotland
Party	Candidate	Votes	%	±%
Labour	Michael John Reppion *	unopposed		
Registered electors				
Labour hold		Swing		

=== 1934 ===
No. 3 South Scotland
Party	Candidate	Votes	%	±%
Labour	Joseph Harrington *	unopposed		
Registered electors		8,428		
Labour hold		Swing		

=== 1935 ===
No. 3 South Scotland
Party	Candidate	Votes	%	±%
Labour	John Sheehan *	2,625	93%	
Independent	Thomas Patrick Sheehan	187	7%	
Majority		2,438		
Registered electors		8,308		
Turnout		2,812	34%	
Labour hold		Swing		

=== 1936 ===
No. 3 South Scotland
Party	Candidate	Votes	%	±%
Labour	Michael John Reppion *	unopposed		
Registered electors		8,308		
Labour hold		Swing		

=== 1937 ===
No. 3 South Scotland
Party	Candidate	Votes	%	±%
Labour	Joseph Harrington *	3,619	97%	
Independent Labour	Charles Malachie Williams	113	3%	
Majority		3,619		
Registered electors		7,964		
Turnout		3,732	47%	
Labour hold		Swing		

=== 1938 ===
No. 3 South Scotland
Party	Candidate	Votes	%	±%
Labour	John Sheehan *	unopposed		
Registered electors				
Labour hold		Swing		

=== 1945 ===
South Scotland
Party	Candidate	Votes	%	±%
Labour	Michael John Reppion	unopposed		
Registered electors		5,971		

=== 1946 ===
South Scotland
Party	Candidate	Votes	%	±%
Labour	Frederick Ernest Granby	unopposed		
Registered electors		6,375		

=== 1947 ===
South Scotland
Party	Candidate	Votes	%	±%
Labour	John Sheehan	unopposed		
Registered electors		6,302		
Labour hold		Swing		

=== 1949 ===
South Scotland
Party	Candidate	Votes	%	±%
Labour	Michael John Reppion *	2,940	97%	
Communist	Dr. Cyril Taylor	103	3.4%	
Majority		2,940		
Registered electors		6,183		
Turnout		3,043	49%	
Labour hold		Swing		

=== 1950 ===
South Scotland - 2 seats
Party	Candidate	Votes	%	±%
Labour	Frederick Ernest Granby ^{(PARTY)}	2,053	97%	
Labour	Edward Corrigan ^{(PARTY)}	1,988	94%	
Communist	Dr. Cyril Taylor	66	3%	
Majority		1,987		
Registered electors		6,355		
Turnout		2,119	33%	
Labour gain from Conservative		Swing		

=== 1951 ===
South Scotland - 2 seats
Party	Candidate	Votes	%	±%
Labour	John Sheehan *	1,471	92%	
Labour	David Cowley	1,465	91%	
Communist	Richard Cuerdon	134	8%	
Majority		1,471		
Registered electors		6,670		
Turnout		1,605	24%	
Labour hold		Swing		
Labour hold		Swing		

=== 1952 ===
South Scotland
Party	Candidate	Votes	%	±%
Labour	Richard Corrigan ^{(PARTY)}	2,295	97%	0%
Communist	Richard Cuerdon	72	3%	0%
Majority		2,295		
Registered electors		6,781		
Turnout		2,367	35%	−14%
Labour hold		Swing		

This was the last election before the new boundaries. Deleted ward names after this includes Brunswick, Castle Street, Edge Hill, Exchange, Garston, Great George, Kirkdale, Little Woolton, Much Woolton, North Scotland, St. Anne's, St. Peter's, Sefton Park East, Sefton Park West, South Scotland, Walton, Wavertree, Wavertree West and West Derby.
