= Netherfield (Liverpool ward) =

Former ward in Liverpool

Coordinates: 53.4240°N 2.9670°W

Netherfield Ward
- Former ward
- Location within Merseyside
- OS grid reference: SJ350925
  - London: 178 mi (286 km) South
- Metropolitan borough: City of Liverpool
- Metropolitan county: Merseyside
- Region: North West
- Country: England
- Sovereign state: United Kingdom
- Post town: LIVERPOOL
- Postcode district: L5
- Dialling code: 0151
- Police: Merseyside
- Fire: Merseyside
- Ambulance: North West
- UK Parliament: Liverpool Walton

Netherfield was a former electoral ward in the City of Liverpool, Merseyside, England, which existed from 1895 until its dissolution in 1973 as part of a major boundary reorganization.

== History ==
Netherfield ward was created in 1895 following the division of the original Everton ward into four: Everton, Netherfield, St. Domingo, and Brockfield. The ward was named after Netherfield Road, a key thoroughfare in the area.

In 1973, as part of a wider reorganization of Liverpool’s wards, Netherfield was abolished and its areas were merged into newly drawn wards. The restructuring aimed to modernize the city's electoral boundaries.

== Geography ==
Netherfield ward was located in the northern part of Liverpool, covering areas around Netherfield Road and parts of Everton. It was bordered by the Everton, St. Domingo, and Brockfield wards. The area was historically residential, with close links to Liverpool’s docks and city centre.

== Legacy ==
Though the ward no longer exists, its name remains associated with Netherfield Road, a historically significant part of Liverpool. The electoral changes of 1973 marked a shift in the city’s political landscape, with older wards like Netherfield being absorbed into broader constituencies.

== Elections ==
=== 1914 ===
No. 8 Netherfield
Party	Candidate	Votes	%	±%
Conservative	Harold Edward Davies *	unopposed		
Registered electors				
Conservative hold		Swing		

=== 1919 ===
No. 22 Netherfield
Party	Candidate	Votes	%	±%
Independent	John Walker *	2,109	76%	
Coalition Labour	William Edward McLachlan	649	24%	
Majority		1,460		
Registered electors		10,152		
Turnout		2,758	27%	
Independent hold		Swing		

=== 1920 ===
No. 22 Netherfield
Party	Candidate	Votes	%	±%
Conservative	William Ball *	4,042	73%	
Labour	John Archibald Metcalfe	1,481	27%	
Majority		2,561		
Registered electors		10,349		
Turnout		5,523	53%	
Conservative hold		Swing		

=== 1921 ===
No. 22 Netherfield
Party	Candidate	Votes	%	±%
Conservative	Harold Edward Davies *	3,696	86%	
Labour	Vincent Lloyd	598	14%	
Majority		3,098		
Registered electors		10,615		
Turnout		4,294	40%	
Conservative hold		Swing		

=== 1922 ===
No. 22 Netherfield
Party	Candidate	Votes	%	±%
Patriotic Labour	John Walker *	2,654	42%	
Ind. Conservative	William Edward McLachlan	2,219	35%	
Labour	George Chadwick	1,350	22%	
Irish Nationalist	Patrick Charles Roche	55	1%	
Majority		435		
Registered electors		10,745		
Turnout		6,278	58%	
Patriotic Labour gain from Independent				

=== 1923 ===
No. 22 Netherfield
Party	Candidate	Votes	%	±%
Conservative	William Edward McLaclan	2,655	62%	
Patriotic Protestant	Christopher Haigh	1,155	27%	
Labour	George Chadwick	470	11%	
Majority		1,510		
Registered electors		11,291		
Turnout		4,290	38%	
Conservative hold		Swing		

=== 1924 ===
No. 22 Netherfield
Party	Candidate	Votes	%	±%
Conservative	Alfred Michael Urding *	4,358	73%	
Labour	George Chadwick	1,617	27%	
Majority		2,741		
Registered electors		11,548		
Turnout		5,975	52%	
Conservative hold		Swing		

=== 1925 ===
No. 22 Netherfield
Party	Candidate	Votes	%	±%
Protestant	John Walker *	2,844	58%	
Labour	George Chadwick	2,023	42%	
Majority		821		
Registered electors		11,753		
Turnout		4,867	41%	
Protestant gain from Patriotic Labour				

=== 1926 ===
No. 22 Netherfield
Party	Candidate	Votes	%	±%
Labour	George Chadwick	3,341	58%	
Conservative	William Edward McLaclan *	2,380	42%	
Majority		961		
Registered electors		11,808		
Turnout		5,721	48%	
Labour gain from Conservative		Swing		

=== 1927 ===
No. 22 Netherfield
Party	Candidate	Votes	%	±%
Conservative	Alfred Michael Urding *	3,164	50.5%	
Labour	John Bagot	3,102	49.5%	
Majority		62		
Registered electors		11,590		
Turnout		6,266	54%	
Conservative hold		Swing		

=== 1928 ===
No. 22 Netherfield
Party	Candidate	Votes	%	±%
Labour	John Bagot	3,150	52%	
Protestant	John Walker *	2,864	48%	
Majority		286		
Registered electors		11,178		
Turnout		6,014	54%	
Labour gain from Protestant		Swing		

=== 1929 ===
No. 22 Netherfield
Party	Candidate	Votes	%	±%
Labour	George Chadwick *	3,199	50%	
Conservative	John Walker	3,165	50%	
Majority		34		
Registered electors		12,438		
Turnout		6,364	51%	
Labour hold		Swing		

=== 1930 ===
No. 22 Netherfield
Party	Candidate	Votes	%	±%
Conservative	Alfred Michael Urding *	3,770	53%	
Labour	Alexander Key	1,721	24%	
Protestant	Albert Clayton	1,318	19%	
Independent	William Edward McLaclan	276	4%	
Majority		2,049		
Registered electors		12,178		
Turnout		7,085	58%	
Conservative hold		Swing		

=== 1931 ===
No. 22 Netherfield
Party	Candidate	Votes	%	±%
Conservative	William John Matthew Clark	3,632	55%	
Labour	John Bagot *	2,984	45%	
Majority		648		
Registered electors		12,090		
Turnout		6,616	55%	
Conservative gain from Labour		Swing		

=== 1932 ===
No. 22 Netherfield
Party	Candidate	Votes	%	±%
Labour	George Chadwick *	3,079	47%	
Conservative	Arnold Barkby	1,980	30%	
Protestant	Albert Clayton	1,490	23%	
Majority		1,090		
Registered electors		12,078		
Turnout		6,549	54%	
Labour hold		Swing		

=== 1933 ===
No. 22 Netherfield
Party	Candidate	Votes	%	±%
Labour	John Bagot	2,823	40%	
Protestant	Richard Bradley	2,384	34%	
Conservative	Alfred Michael Urding *	1,815	26%	
Majority		439		
Registered electors		11.985		
Turnout		7,022	59%	
Labour gain from Conservative		Swing		

=== 1934 ===
No. 22 Netherfield
Party	Candidate	Votes	%	±%
Labour	Dr. Joseph Sytner	2,344	38%	
Protestant	Richard Bradley	1,912	31%	
Conservative	William John Matthew Clark *	1,855	30%	
Majority		432		
Registered electors		11,544		
Turnout		6,111	53%	
Labour gain from Conservative		Swing		

=== 1935 ===
No. 22 Netherfield
Party	Candidate	Votes	%	±%
Conservative	William John Matthew Clark	3,451	57%	
Labour	George Chadwick *	2,505	42%	
Independent Labour and Protestant	Joshua George Perkins	68	1%	
Majority		946		
Registered electors		11,301		
Turnout		6,024	53%	
Conservative gain from Labour		Swing		

=== 1936 ===
No. 22 Netherfield
Party	Candidate	Votes	%	±%
Protestant	Robert Bradley	3,493	56%	
Labour	John Bagot *	2,692	44%	
Majority		801		
Registered electors		11,023		
Turnout		6,185	56%	
Protestant gain from Labour		Swing		

=== 1937 ===
No. 22 Netherfield
Party	Candidate	Votes	%	±%
Conservative	Evan Thomas Edwards	4,436	68%	
Labour	John Bagot	2,073	32%	
Majority		2,363		
Registered electors		10,638		
Turnout		6,509	61%	
Conservative gain from Labour		Swing		

=== 1938 ===
No. 22 Netherfield
Party	Candidate	Votes	%	±%
Conservative	William John Matthew Clark *	3,571	72%	
Labour	William James Riddick	1,379	28%	
Majority		2,192		
Registered electors		10,299		
Turnout		1,503	48%	
Conservative hold		Swing		

=== 1945 ===
Netherfield
Party	Candidate	Votes	%	±%
Protestant	George E. Lewis	1,611	51%	
Labour	William J. Riddick	1,562	49%	
Majority		48		
Registered electors		10,653		
Turnout		3,174	30%	

=== 1946 ===
Netherfield
Party	Candidate	Votes	%	±%
Conservative and Protestant	Harry Victor Shaw	2,161	57%	
Labour	George Carmichael	1,634	43%	
Majority		527		
Registered electors		10,300		
Turnout		3,795	37%	

=== 1947 ===
Netherfield
Party	Candidate	Votes	%	±%
Protestant	George Edward Lewis	2,446	63%	
Labour	George Carmichael	1,427	37%	
Majority		1,019		
Registered electors		10,375		
Turnout		3,873	37%	
Protestant hold		Swing		

=== 1949 ===
Netherfield
Party	Candidate	Votes	%	±%
Protestant	William George Jones ^{(PARTY)}	2,394	59%	+8%
Labour	Thomas Robinson	1,627	40%	−9%
Communist	Sidney Foster	49	1%	+1%
Majority		767		
Registered electors		10,341		
Turnout		4,070	39%	+9%
Protestant hold		Swing	+8%	

=== 1950 ===
Netherfield
Party	Candidate	Votes	%	±%
Conservative & Protestant	Harry Victor Shaw	2,030	62%	−1%
Labour	Thomas Robinson	1,216	37%	
Communist	Sidney Foster	52	2%	
Majority		814		
Registered electors		10,012		
Turnout		3,298	33%	−4%
Conservative and Protestant hold		Swing		

=== 1951 ===
Netherfield
Party	Candidate	Votes	%	±%
Protestant	George Edward Lewis *	1,878	67%	+4%
Labour	Thomas Robinson	926	33%	−4%
Majority		952		
Registered electors		10,134		
Turnout		2,804	28%	+9%
Protestant hold		Swing	+4%	

=== 1952 ===
Netherfield
Party	Candidate	Votes	%	±%
Labour	Richard Clitherow	1,925	55%	+15%
Protestant	William George Jones *	1,555	45%	−14%
Majority		370		
Registered electors		10,107		
Turnout		3,480	34%	−5%
Labour gain from Protestant		Swing		

=== 1953 ===
Netherfield - 3 seats
Party	Candidate	Votes	%	±%
Protestant	J. Dorman	2,237	55%	
Protestant	G. E. Lewis *	2,198	54%	−13%
Conservative and Protestant	H. V. Shaw *	2,125	52%	−10%
Labour	R. Clitherow '*	1,831	45%	−10%
Labour	T. Robinson	1,743	44%	−11%
Labour	J. J. Brayton	1,664	41%	−14%
Majority		406		
Registered electors		10,129		
Turnout		4,068	40%	+6%
Protestant gain from Labour		Swing		
Protestant hold		Swing		
Protestant hold		Swing		

=== 1954 ===
Netherfield
Party	Candidate	Votes	%	±%
Labour	T. Robinson	1,806	53%	+12%
Conservative and Protestant	G. Clark	1,578	47%	
Majority		228		
Registered electors		10,009		
Turnout		3,384	34%	−6%
Labour hold		Swing		

=== 1955 ===
Netherfield
Party	Candidate	Votes	%	±%
Protestant	G. E. Lewis *	1,879	50.1%	
Labour	H. G. Trainor	1,874	49.9%	
Majority		5		
Registered electors		9,811		
Turnout		3,753	38%	
Protestant hold		Swing		

=== 1956 ===
Netherfield
Party	Candidate	Votes	%	±%
Protestant	J. Dorman *	1,522	52%	
Labour	G. Carmichael	1,422	48%	
Majority		100		
Registered electors		9,433		
Turnout		2,944	31%	
Protestant hold		Swing		

=== 1957 ===
Netherfield
Party	Candidate	Votes	%	±%
Labour	T. Robinson *	1,397	57%	
Conservative	T. B. Rutter	1,066	43%	
Majority		331		
Registered electors		9,330		
Turnout		2,463	26%	
Labour hold		Swing		

=== 1958 ===
Netherfield
Party	Candidate	Votes	%	±%
Labour	R. Clitherow	1,364	54%	
Conservative	E. Shaw	1,168	46%	
Majority		196		
Registered electors		9,137		
Turnout		2,532	28%	
Labour gain from Protestant		Swing		

=== 1959 ===
Netherfield
Party	Candidate	Votes	%	±%
Protestant	J. Dorman *	1,790	54%	
Labour	G. Sykes	990	30%	
Independent	G. Carmichael	509	15%	
Majority		800		
Registered electors		8,992		
Turnout		3,289	37%	
Protestant hold		Swing		

=== 1960 ===
Netherfield
Party	Candidate	Votes	%	±%
Protestant	F. Crook	1,322	56%	+56%
Labour	T. Robinson *	1,057	44%	−13%
Majority		265		
Registered electors		8,932		
Turnout		2,379	27%	+1%
Protestant gain from Labour		Swing		

=== 1961 ===
Netherfield
Party	Candidate	Votes	%	±%
Protestant	A. Brown	1,409	58%	+58%
Labour	R. Clitherow *	1,020	42%	−12%
Majority		389		
Registered electors		8,626		
Turnout		2,429	28%	0%
Protestant gain from Labour		Swing		

=== 1962 ===
Netherfield
Party	Candidate	Votes	%	±%
Protestant	A Harris ^{(PARTY)}	1,447	51%	▼3%
Labour	L. Caplan	1,413	49%	▲19%
Majority		34		
Registered electors		8,306		
Turnout		2,860	34%	▼3%
Protestant hold		Swing		

=== 1963 ===
Netherfield
Party	Candidate	Votes	%	±%
Labour	N. S. Barnett	1,326	57%	+13%
Protestant	R. F. Goll ^{(PARTY)}	1,007	43%	−13%
Majority		319		
Registered electors		7,597		
Turnout		2,333	31%	+4%
Labour gain from Protestant		Swing		

=== 1964 ===
Netherfield
Party	Candidate	Votes	%	±%
Protestant	A. Brown *	1,043	51%	−7%
Labour	G. Carmichael	988	49%	+7%
Majority		55		
Registered electors		6,893		
Turnout		2,031	29%	+1%
Protestant hold		Swing		

=== 1965 ===
Netherfield
Party	Candidate	Votes	%	±%
Protestant	A. Harris *	725	58%	+7%
Labour	E. C. Pimlett	526	42%	−7%
Majority		199		
Registered electors		5,872		
Turnout		1,251	21%	−13%
Protestant hold		Swing		

=== 1966 ===
Netherfield
Party	Candidate	Votes	%	±%
Protestant	W. Owen	586	67%	+24%
Labour	Dr. N. S. Barnett *	253	29%	−28%
Communist	F. Cartwright	35	4%	+4%
Majority		333		
Registered electors		4,812		
Turnout		874	18%	−13%
Protestant gain from Labour		Swing		

=== 1967 ===
Netherfield
Party	Candidate	Votes	%	±%
Protestant	Albert Brown *	679	62%	+11%
Labour	Frank Keating	372	34%	−15%
Communist	Frank Cartwright	46	4%	+4%
Majority		307		
Registered electors		4,021		
Turnout		1,097	27%	−2%
Protestant hold		Swing		

=== 1968 ===
Netherfield
Party	Candidate	Votes	%	±%
Protestant	James Boardnman ^{(PARTY)}	448	52%	−6%
Labour	John L. Hughes	206	24%	−18%
	Robert D. Jenkins	165	19%	
Communist	Francis J. Cartright	42	5%	+5%
Majority		242		
Registered electors		3,982		
Turnout		861	22%	+1%
Protestant gain from Labour		Swing		

=== 1969 ===
Netherfield
Party	Candidate	Votes	%	±%
Protestant	William Owen *	579	70%	+3%
Labour	Edward Loyden	194	23%	−6%
Communist	Frank Cartwright	54	7%	+3%
Majority		385		
Registered electors		3,984		
Turnout		827	21%	+3%
Protestant hold		Swing		

=== 1970 ===
Netherfield
Party	Candidate	Votes	%	±%
Protestant	A. Brown *	750	57%	−5%
Labour	S. J. Chegwin	572	43%	+9%
Majority		178		
Registered electors		4,359		
Turnout		1,322	30%	+3%
Protestant hold		Swing		

=== 1971 ===
Netherfield
Party	Candidate	Votes	%	±%
Labour	J. Mottram	775	57%	+27%
Protestant	J. Boardman *	514	38%	−26%
Liberal	J. J. Hastings	60	4%	+4%
Majority		261		
Registered electors		4,327		
Turnout		1,349	31%	+13%
Labour gain from Protestant		Swing		

=== 1972 ===
Netherfield
Party	Candidate	Votes	%	±%
Labour	F. P. Hughes	869	55%	+32%
Protestant	W. Owens *	712	45%	−25%
Majority		157		
Registered electors		4,280		
Turnout		1,581	37%	+16%
Labour gain from Protestant		Swing		

=== 1973 ===
Central, Everton, Netherfield
Party	Candidate	Votes	%	±%
Labour	J. Parry *	1,627	66%	
Labour	J. E. Walker *	1,442	58%	
Labour	J. Finnegan ^{(PARTY)}	1,425	58%	
Conservative	P. J. Palmer	474	19%	
Conservative	W. Owens	464	19%	
Conservative	R. S. Charles	380	19%	
Liberal	J. F. Owen	365	15%	
Majority		1,153		
Registered electors				
Turnout		2,466		
Labour hold		Swing		
Labour hold		Swing		
Labour hold		Swing		

=== 1975 ===
Central, Everton, Netherfield
Party	Candidate	Votes	%	±%
Labour	J. Finnegan *	1,379	66%	0%
Conservative	A. Brown	569	27%	+8%
Liberal	P. Seddon	135	6%	−9%
Majority		810		
Registered electors		12,485		
Turnout		2,083	17%	
Labour hold		Swing		

=== 1976 ===
Central, Everton, Netherfield
Party	Candidate	Votes	%	±%
Labour	J. E. Walker *	1,658	71%	+5
Conservative	J. Crowe	390	17%	−2%
National Party of UK	A. J. Roberts	148	6%	
Liberal	G. Scattergood	135	6%	−9%
Majority		1,268		
Registered electors		11,970		
Turnout		2,331	19%	
Labour hold		Swing		

=== 1978 ===
Central, Everton, Netherfield
Party	Candidate	Votes	%	±%
Labour	J. Parry *	1,414	52%	−14%
Liberal	Cathy Hancox	976	36%	+21%
Conservative	J. B. King	319	12%	−7%
Majority		438		
Registered electors		11,812		
Turnout		2,709	23%	
Labour hold		Swing		
