= Edge Hill (Liverpool ward) =

Electoral division in England

- Edge Hill ward within Liverpool
- Population: 3,630 (2023 electorate)
- Metropolitan borough: City of Liverpool
- Metropolitan county: Merseyside
- Region: North West
- Country: England
- Sovereign state: United Kingdom
- UK Parliament: Liverpool Wavertree
- Councillors: Naz Hasan (Labour Party)

Edge Hill ward is an electoral division of Liverpool City Council centred on the Edge Hill area of the city. It was created in 1895 from part of the previous West Derby ward where three councillors were elected. It was dissolved in 1953.

The ward was recreated in 2023 following a review by the Local Government Boundary Commission for England which decided that the existing 30 wards each represented by three Councillors should be replaced by 64 wards represented by 85 councillors with varying representation by one, two or three councillors per ward. The Edge Hill ward was reinstated as a single-member ward from the western half of the former Picton ward and a small part of the former Princes Park ward. The ward contains Archbishop Blanch School, the Edge Hill railway station and Wavertree Botanic Garden and Park.

== Councillors ==
Election	Councillor	Councillor	Councillor
1953 - 2022 WARD DISESTABLISHED
2023	Naz Hasan (Lab)		

indicates seat up for re-election after boundary changes.

indicates seat up for re-election.

indicates change in affiliation.

indicates seat up for re-election after casual vacancy.

== Election results ==
=== Elections of the 2020s ===
4th May 2023
Party	Candidate	Votes	%	±%
Labour	Naz Hasan	526	65.67	
Liberal Democrats	Shiv Kumar Pande	148	18.48	
Green	Suzanne Hunt	89	11.11	
Conservative	Graham Clifford Moore	38	4.74	
Majority		378	47.19	
Turnout		801	22.07	
Rejected ballots		5	0.62	
Total ballots		806	22.20	
Registered electors		3,630		
Labour win (new seat)				
