= Liverpool Protestant Party =

- Founded: 1903
- Dissolved: 1974
- Merged into: Conservatives
- Ideology: Conservatism; Religious conservatism Protestant Interests; British Unionism
- Political position: Right-wing
- Religion: Protestantism

The Liverpool Protestant Party (LPP) was a minor political party operating in the city of Liverpool in northwest England.

== Origins and context ==
The origins of the Liverpool Protestant Party lie in the increasing dissatisfaction with the Conservative and Unionist Party felt by many Orange Lodge members and other militant Protestants in the late 19th and early 20th Centuries.

This unease was caused by a number of issues:

1. The use of the Conservative whip in Parliament to oppose the extension of factory inspection to convent laundries
2. The Education Act 1902 making public money available to Catholic schools ("Rome on the Rates")
3. The failure to enact a new Church Discipline Act, or amend the old one, to provide for a more effective counter to extreme ritualism in the Church of England.

Large scale Irish migration, especially by Irish Catholics, to Liverpool had seen the city's Roman Catholic population greatly increase. The Liverpool Protestant Party fiercely opposed the construction of a cathedral for the Catholic community of Liverpool. The first attempt to secure independent Protestant representation was made by John Kensit, leader of the Protestant Truth Society, who stood for election to the House of Commons in Brighton in 1898. In Ireland, this unease manifested itself in the creation of the Independent Orange Order in Belfast in Ulster in 1902.

== Formation ==
There was disquiet due to the reluctance of the Conservative-controlled Liverpool Corporation to set aside areas of public open space specifically for outdoor meetings. George Wise, a prominent local Protestant leader, had been imprisoned for refusing to be bound over to keep the peace following disturbances at meetings held in public squares and gardens. On his release from Walton Gaol on 6 June he decided to pursue independent Protestant representation on the city council.

Support was centred among Wise's adherents, including large numbers of members of the Orange Order and the congregation of the Protestant Reformers Church of which he was the Pastor. Traditionally the "Orange vote" would go to the Conservatives but in 1903, the LPP was formed as a distinct party by George Wise.

== 1903 to 1919 ==
Four seats were contested and three won, including Kirkdale. Representation was also secured on the West Derby Board of Guardians, which supervised health care and poor relief in the North and East of the city. Some rapprochement with the Conservatives took place before World War I through co-operation to fight the Irish Home Rule Bill, although the Conservative leader in the city, Alderman Archibald Salvidge, was opposed to independent Protestant representation.

== 1920–1930 ==
The support of the Conservative Party for the establishment of the Irish Free State renewed dissatisfaction with them amongst militant Protestants. In Liverpool this was manifested in a loss of membership in the Conservative Workingmen's Association. The Liverpool Protestant Party believed the establishment of the Irish Free State was a mere stepping stone to an Irish republic. The National Protestant Electoral Federation (NPEF) was formed at this time with four aims:-

1. The promotion of the study of Protestantism
2. The maintenance of the Protestant succession to the throne (as established by the Act of Settlement 1701)
3. To assist the return of robust Protestants, irrespective of party, as representatives on public bodies
4. To protect the interests of Protestant workers in Trade unions

In Liverpool the policies of the NPEF were put into effect for the 1922 elections to the Boards of Guardians. The NPEF endorsed Protestant Party candidates and any other candidates who were willing to add the word Protestant to their party name. This resulted in two Protestant Party and two Protestant & Unionist candidates being elected with 25,787 votes between them.

== 1930 to 1945 ==
The Local Government Act 1929 abolished the Boards of Guardians and handed their responsibilities to local authorities. Liverpool Corporation took over three Boards – West Derby for the North and East of the city, Liverpool for the City Centre and Toxteth Park for the South. Some rationalisation of the various hospital and other facilities took place which meant that the Liverpool Board of Guardians 9-acre (36,000 m^{2}) facility at Brownlow Hill became redundant. The city council decided to sell the site to the Archdiocese of Liverpool in order for the archdiocese to build a Catholic cathedral. Sales of redundant land and property to Catholic interests had been blocked by Protestant representatives on the Boards, but under the council the sale went ahead with Conservative approval.

This led to the Protestant Party contesting the City Council elections of November 1930. Only the party leader Harry Dixon Longbottom was successful, in St Domingo, but in several wards the Protestant Party took enough votes from the Conservatives to cause them to lose them to Labour.

It opposed the emergent socialist politics of the Labour movement and called for curbs on immigration into Great Britain from Roman Catholic areas of Ireland. It also blamed Irish immigrants for unemployment, poor housing and high rates.

It primarily fought local government seats, but did stand the Reverend H. D. Longbottom in the Liverpool Kirkdale seat for Westminster elections from 1931 until 1945. In 1931, he took a quarter of the votes cast.

== 1945–1974 ==
For all but one year – 1963 – between 1945 and 1970, the Protestant Party was the third largest party on the council, in terms of seat share. The party tended to stand in the northern St. Domingo and Netherfield wards, unopposed by the Conservatives, and in return voted with them on most issues in the council chamber. The party also held one Aldermanic seat on the council from 1945 to 1957. It won its last seat in 1973, but activity was waning and, as the "Orange vote" subsided in influence, the LPP found it harder to continue.

Following the Local Government Act 1972, Liverpool City Council faced ward redistribution. In 1974, the Protestant Party was disbanded, with most of their members joining the Conservatives.

== Legacy ==
The "Orange vote" has not totally died in Liverpool. The Democratic Unionist Party (DUP) has looked into the possibility of establishing a branch in Liverpool, possibly considering standing local government candidates there as well. Former members of the LPP have been involved with this attempt.

== Leaders ==
1903: George Wise
1916: T. B. Wilmot
1919: Harry Longbottom
1962: Ronald F. Henderson
c.1970: Roy Hughes
