= 1910 Liverpool City Council election =

Liverpool City Council elections 1910

← 1909	November 1, 1910	1911 →

34 seats were up for election (one third): one seat for each of the 34 wards 69 (incl. Aldermen) seats needed for a majority

Elections to Liverpool City Council were held on 1 November 1910.

Fourteen of the thirty-four wards were not contested.

After the election, the composition of the council was:

Party	Councillors	±	Aldermen	Total
Conservative	??	-4	??	??
Liberal	??	+3	??	??
Irish Nationalist	??	0	??	??
Labour	??	+1	??	??
Independent	??	??	??	??

== Election result ==
Liverpool local election result 1910
Party	Seats	Gains	Losses	Net gain/loss	Seats %	Votes %	Votes	+/−
Conservative	19	1	5	-4	56%	56%	19,448	
Liberal	10	4	1	+3	30%	29%	10,104	
Irish Nationalist	3	0	0	0	9%	0%	0	
Labour	1	1	0	+1	1%	10%	3,541	
Independent	1	1	0	+1	3%	4%	1,521	

== Ward results ==
* - Retiring Councillor seeking re-election

Comparisons are made with the 1907 election results, as the retiring councillors were elected in that year.

=== Abercromby ===
No. 18 Abercromby
Party	Candidate	Votes	%	±%
Conservative	Thomas James Smith the younger *	761	61%	
Liberal	Miss Harriet Mary Johnson	487	39%	
Majority		274		
Registered electors		2,344		
Turnout		1,248	53%	
Conservative hold		Swing		

=== Aigburth ===
No. 29 Aigburth
Party	Candidate	Votes	%	±%
Conservative	William Parkfield Wethered	704	54%	
Liberal	William Abercromby	591	46%	
Majority		113		
Registered electors		1,754		
Turnout		1,295	74%	
Conservative hold		Swing		

=== Anfield ===
No. 3 Anfield
Party	Candidate	Votes	%	±%
Conservative	Edward Russell-Taylor *	628	80%	
Independent	William Robert Roberts	154	20%	
Majority		474		
Registered electors		3,170		
Turnout		782	25%	
Conservative hold		Swing		

=== Breckfield ===
No. 6 Breckfield
Party	Candidate	Votes	%	±%
Conservative	William Rudd	1,109	59%	
Liberal	Thomas Williams	781	41%	
Majority		328		
Registered electors		4,040		
Turnout		1,890	47%	
Conservative hold		Swing		

=== Brunswick ===
No. 25 Brunswick
Party	Candidate	Votes	%	±%
Liberal	Patrick Charles Kelly *	unopposed		
Registered electors				
Liberal hold		Swing		

=== Castle Street ===
No. 18 Castle Street
Party	Candidate	Votes	%	±%
Conservative	James Philip Reynolds	unopposed		
Registered electors				
Conservative hold		Swing		

=== Dingle ===
No. 26 Dingle
Party	Candidate	Votes	%	±%
Conservative	Algernon Charles Francis Henderson	unopposed		
Registered electors				
Conservative hold		Swing		

=== Edge Hill ===
No. 12 Edge Hill
Party	Candidate	Votes	%	±%
Labour	Edward Whitley	1,001	49%	
Conservative	Joseph Henry Harrison *	952	47%	
Socialist	Charles Wilson	69	3%	
Socialist	James Murphy	8	0.4%	
Majority		49		
Registered electors		4,525		
Turnout		2,030	45%	
Labour gain from Conservative		Swing		

=== Everton ===
No. 9 Everton
Party	Candidate	Votes	%	±%
Conservative	Gerald Kyffin-Taylor MP*	Unopposed	N/A	N/A
Registered electors				
Conservative hold				

=== Exchange ===
No. 16 Exchange
Party	Candidate	Votes	%	±%
Liberal	Frederick Charles Bowring	unopposed		
Registered electors				
Liberal hold		Swing		

=== Fairfield ===
No. 4 Fairfield
Party	Candidate	Votes	%	±%
Liberal	James Hughes junior *	1,118	53%	
Conservative	Dr. Francis William Bailey	989	47%	
Majority		129		
Registered electors		3,864		
Turnout		2,107	55%	
Liberal hold		Swing		

=== Garston ===
No. 30 Garston
Party	Candidate	Votes	%	±%
Conservative	Frederick James Rawlinson *	unopposed		
Registered electors				
Conservative hold		Swing		

=== Granby ===
No. 22 Granby
Party	Candidate	Votes	%	±%
Independent	Miss Eleanor Florence Rathbone *	1,211	61%	
Conservative	Robert Richards	769	39%	
Majority		442	22%	
Registered electors		3,555		
Turnout		1,980	56%	
Independent hold		Swing		

=== Great George ===
No. 17 Great George
Party	Candidate	Votes	%	±%
Liberal	Samuel Skelton	575	51%	
Conservative	Dr.Albert Edward Davis *	559	49%	
Majority		16		
Registered electors		1,608		
Turnout		1,134	71%	
Liberal gain from Conservative		Swing		

=== Kensington ===
No. 11 Kensington
Party	Candidate	Votes	%	±%
Conservative	Samuel Mason Hatchinson *	1,404	75%	
Labour	Arthur Kilpin Bulley	470	25%	
Majority		934	50%	
Registered electors		4,537		
Turnout		1,874	41%	
Conservative hold		Swing		

=== Kirkdale ===
No. 2 Kirkdale
Party	Candidate	Votes	%	±%
Conservative	John George Paris *	1,620	63%	
Labour	John Wolfe Tone Morrissey	948	37%	
Majority		672		
Registered electors		6,314		
Turnout		2,568	41%	
Conservative gain from Protestant		Swing		

=== Low Hill ===
No. 10 Low Hill
Party	Candidate	Votes	%	±%
Conservative	William Boote *	895	60%	
Labour	George Nelson	602	40%	
Majority		293	20%	
Registered electors		3,624		
Turnout		1,497	41%	
Conservative hold		Swing		

=== Netherfield ===
No. 8 Netherfield
Party	Candidate	Votes	%	±%
Conservative	William Ball	792	72%	
Independent	William Henry Archer	310	28%	
Majority		482		
Registered electors		3,514		
Turnout		1,102	31%	
Conservative hold		Swing		

=== North Scotland ===
No. 13 North Scotland
Party	Candidate	Votes	%	±%
Irish Nationalist	George Jeremy Lynskey *	unopposed		
Registered electors				
Irish Nationalist hold		Swing		

=== Old Swan ===
No. 28A Old Swan
Party	Candidate	Votes	%	±%
Conservative	Charles Burchall *	unopposed		
Registered electors				
Conservative hold		Swing		

=== Prince's Park ===
No. 23 Prince's Park
Party	Candidate	Votes	%	±%
Conservative	Charles Henry Rutherford	unopposed		
Registered electors				
Conservative hold		Swing		

=== Sandhills ===
No. 1 Sandhills
Party	Candidate	Votes	%	±%
Liberal	Alfred Gates	1,066	59%	
Conservative	John Lucas Rankin	736	41%	
Majority		330		
Registered electors		3,199		
Turnout		1,802	56%	
Liberal hold		Swing		

=== St. Anne's ===
No. 17 St. Anne's
Party	Candidate	Votes	%	±%
Liberal	Dr. James Clement Baxter *	unopposed		
Registered electors				
Liberal hold		Swing		

=== St. Domingo ===
No. 23 St. Domingo
Party	Candidate	Votes	%	±%
Conservative	Dr. Charles Alexander Hill *	unopposed		
Registered electors				
Conservative hold		Swing		

=== St. Peter's ===
No. 19 St. Peter's
Party	Candidate	Votes	%	±%
Liberal	John Byrne	unopposed		
Registered electors				
Liberal hold		Swing		

=== Sefton Park East ===
No. 24A Sefton Park East
Party	Candidate	Votes	%	±%
Conservative	James Stuart Rankin	1,238	55%	
Liberal	John Morris	1.033	45%	
Majority		205		
Registered electors		3,729		
Turnout		2,271	61%	
Conservative hold		Swing		

=== Sefton Park West ===
No. 16 Sefton Park West
Party	Candidate	Votes	%	±%
Liberal	Frank Campbell Wilson	875	52%	
Conservative	Fred Pritchard *	800	48%	
Majority		75		
Registered electors		2,401		
Turnout		1,675	70%	
Liberal gain from Conservative		Swing		

=== South Scotland ===
No. 14 South Scotland
Party	Candidate	Votes	%	±%
Irish Nationalist	Francis Joseph Harford *	unopposed		
Registered electors				
Irish Nationalist hold		Swing		

=== Vauxhall ===
No. 15 Vauxhall
Party	Candidate	Votes	%	±%
Irish Nationalist	Joseph Hughes *	unopposed		
Registered electors				
Irish Nationalist hold		Swing		

=== Walton ===
No. 3A Walton
Party	Candidate	Votes	%	±%
Conservative	Dr. John George Moyles *	1,627	76%	
Labour	Harry Dawson Large	520	24%	
Majority		1,107		
Registered electors		4,715		
Turnout		2,147	46%	
Conservative hold		Swing		

=== Warbreck ===
No. 27 Warbreck
Party	Candidate	Votes	%	±%
Liberal	Thomas Fleming	978	54%	
Conservative	Sydney Edward Davies *	850	46%	
Majority		128		
Registered electors		3,792		
Turnout		1,828	48%	
Liberal gain from Conservative		Swing		

=== Wavertree ===
No. 5 Wavertree
Party	Candidate	Votes	%	±%
Conservative	Robert Stephen Porter	1,040	55%	
Liberal	Harry Trevor Ellis	865	45%	
Majority		175		
Registered electors		3,593		
Turnout		1,905	53%	
Conservative hold		Swing		

=== Wavertree West ===
No. 33 Wavertree West
Party	Candidate	Votes	%	±%
Liberal	Cecil Heywood Brunner	1,119	55%	
Conservative	Harold Edward Davies	909	45%	
Majority		210		
Registered electors		3,503		
Turnout		2,028	58%	
Liberal gain from Conservative		Swing		

=== West Derby ===
No. 28 West Derby
Party	Candidate	Votes	%	±%
Conservative	Robert Edward Walkington Stephenson *	1,066	63%	
Liberal	Clement Freeman	615	37%	
Majority		450		
Registered electors		3,295		
Turnout		1,682	51%	
Conservative hold		Swing		

== Aldermanic Elections ==
=== Aldermanic Election 9 November 1910 ===
At the meeting of the Council on 9 November 1910, the terms of office of seventeen alderman expired.

The following seventeen were elected as Aldermen by the councillors on 9 November 1910 for a term of six years.

* - re-elected aldermen.

Party	Alderman	Ward
Conservative	William Bartlett *	Brunswick
Liberal	William Benjamin Bowring JP *	Exchange
Liberal	Edmond Brownbill *	South Scotland
Conservative	Edward James Chevalier	Aigburth
Irish Nationalist	Dr. Andrew Commins MP *	Vauxhall
Conservative	Arthur Crosthwaite *	Anfield
Conservative	Charles Herbert Giles *	Prince's Park
Liberal	Jacob Reuben Grant *	Old Swan
Liberal	Richard Robert Meade-King *	Sandhills
Conservative	Thomas Menlove JP *	Breckfield
Conservative	Sir Charles Petrie *	Warbreck
Irish Nationalist	Edward Purcell *	North Scotland
Conservative	Archibald Tutton Salvidge the younger JP *	Abercromby
Conservative	Anthony Shelmerdine	Sefton Park West
Liberal	Frederick Smith *	Castle Street
Liberal	William Henry Watts *	St. Anne's
Conservative	William Humphrey Williams *	St. Domingo

=== Aldermanic Election 3 May 1911 ===
Caused by the death of Alderman Joachim Nicolas Stolterfoht (Conservative, elected as an alderman by the Council on 9 November 1907) on 8 March 1911, which was reported to the Council on 5 April 1911. In his place, Councillor Robert Edward Walkington Stephenson (Conservative, West Derby, elected 1 November 1910) was elected as an alderman by the councillors on 3 May 1911.

Party	Alderman	Ward	Term expires
Conservative	Robert Edward Walkington Stephenson	No.5 Wavertree	1910

== By-Elections ==
=== No.10 Low Hill, 24 November 1910 ===
Caused by the election as an alderman of Councillor Anthony Shelmerdine (Conservative, Low Hill, elected 1 November 1909) by the Council on 9 November 1910.

No. 10 Low Hill
Party	Candidate	Votes	%	±%
Conservative	Dr. Francis William Bailey	999	52%	
Labour	George Nelson	909	48%	
Majority		90		
Registered electors		3,624		
Turnout		1,908	53%	
Conservative hold		Swing		

=== No. 24A Sefton Park East, 2 May 1911 ===
Caused by the death of Councillor John Japp JP (Liberal, Sefton Park East, elected 1 November 1909) on 27 March 1911, which was reported to the Council on 5 April 1911 .

No. 24A Sefton Park East
Party	Candidate	Votes	%	±%
Liberal	Alexander Allan Paton	unopposed		
Registered electors				
Liberal hold		Swing		

The Term of Office to expire on 1 November 1912.

=== No. 12 Edge Hill, 27 April 1911 ===
Caused by the resignation of Councillor Edward Whitley (Labour, elected 1 November 1910), which was reported to the Council on 5 April 1911.

No. 12 Edge Hill
Party	Candidate	Votes	%	±%
Conservative	Frederick Bennett Brough	1,017	55%	
	William Richard Blair	848	45%	
Majority		169		
Registered electors		4,525		
Turnout		1,865	41%	
Conservative gain from Labour		Swing		

=== No. 28 West Derby, 23 May 1911 ===
Caused by the election of Councillor Robert Edward Walkington Stephenson (Conservative, West Derby, elected 1 November 1910) as an alderman by the Council on 3 May 1911.

No. 28 West Derby
Party	Candidate	Votes	%	±%
	Thomas Ithell	600	56%	
	Thomas Utley	468	44%	
Majority		450		
Registered electors		3,295		
Turnout		1,068	32%	
	gain from	Swing		

=== No. 13 North Scotland, 5 August 1911 ===
Caused by the resignation of Councillor Dr. Joseph Maguire (Irish Nationalist, North Scotland, elected unopposed 1 November 1909)

No. 13 North Scotland
Party	Candidate	Votes	%	±%
Irish Nationalist	John Clancy	unopposed		
Registered electors				
Irish Nationalist hold		Swing		
