= 1902 Liverpool City Council election =

Liverpool City Council election

← 1901	1 November 1902	1903 →
	Con	Lib	Irish
Party	Conservative	Liberal	Irish Nationalist
	Lib Unionist
Party	Liberal Unionist
Council Leader before election
Conservative
Council Leader after election
Conservative

Elections to Liverpool City Council were held on Saturday 1 November 1902.

A total of 38 seats were up for election. Seven new seats were up for election for the first time: the third seat for the Anfield ward, and all three seats for each of the new wards of Aigburth and Garston.

20 of the 38 seats were not contested.

After the election, the composition of the council was:

Party	Councillors	±	Aldermen	Total
Conservative	??	+1	??	??
Liberal	??	+5	??	??
Irish Nationalist	??	+1	??	??
Independent Irish Nationalist	??	-1	0	??
Liberal Unionist	??	0	??	??
Labour	??	0	0	??
Independent	??	0	0	??

== Election result ==
Liverpool local election result 1902
Party	Seats	Gains	Losses	Net gain/loss	Seats %	Votes %	Votes	+/−
Conservative	16	3	2	+1	42%			
Liberal	14	5	0	+5	37%			
Irish Nationalist	3	1	0	+1	8%			
Ind. Conservative	2	2	0	+2	5%			
Liberal Unionist	1	0	0	0	3%			
Labour Repr. Cmte.	0	0	0	0	0%			
Independent	0	0	0	0	0%			

In view of the large number of uncontested seats, these statistics should be taken in that context.

== Ward results ==
* - Retiring Councillor seeking re-election

Comparisons are made with the 1899 election results, as the retiring councillors were elected in that year.

=== Abercromby ===
No. 21 Abercromby
Party	Candidate	Votes	%	±%
Liberal	Arthur Black	966	60%	
Conservative	Morris Paterson Jones *	647	40%	
Majority		319		
Registered electors				
Turnout		1,613		
Liberal gain from Conservative		Swing		

=== Aigburth ===
No. 29 Aigburth - 3 seats
Party	Candidate	Votes	%	±%
Liberal	Archibald Bathgate	unopposed		
Conservative	William Hall Jowett	unopposed		
Conservative	Arthur Twiss Kemble	unopposed		
Registered electors				
Liberal win (new seat)				
Conservative win (new seat)				
Conservative win (new seat)				

=== Anfield ===
No. 3 Anfield
Party	Candidate	Votes	%	±%
Liberal	William Evans *	unopposed		
Registered electors				
Liberal win (new seat)				

=== Breckfield ===
No. 6 Breckfield
Party	Candidate	Votes	%	±%
Conservative	Louis Samuel Cohen *	unopposed		
Registered electors				
Conservative hold		Swing		

=== Brunswick ===
No. 25 Brunswick
Party	Candidate	Votes	%	±%
Liberal	Thomas Roberts *	unopposed		
Registered electors				
Liberal hold		Swing		

=== Castle Street ===
No. 18 Castle Street
Party	Candidate	Votes	%	±%
Conservative	John Lawrence *	unopposed		
Registered electors				
Conservative hold		Swing		

=== Dingle ===
No. 26 Dingle
Party	Candidate	Votes	%	±%
Conservative	Austin Taylor			
Registered electors				
Conservative hold		Swing		

=== Edge Hill ===
No. 12 Edge Hill
Party	Candidate	Votes	%	±%
Conservative	Samuel Wasse Higginbottom MP *	1,500	64%	
Labour	Robert Clement Faulkener	847	36%	
Majority		653		
Registered electors				
Turnout		2,347		
Conservative hold		Swing		

=== Everton ===
No. 9 Everton
Party	Candidate	Votes	%	±%
Liberal	William Denton *	unopposed		
Registered electors				
Liberal hold		Swing		

=== Exchange ===
No. 16 Exchange
Party	Candidate	Votes	%	±%
Liberal	Edmond Brownbill *	unopposed		
Registered electors				
Liberal hold		Swing		

=== Fairfield ===
No. 4 Fairfield
Party	Candidate	Votes	%	±%
Conservative	Frank John Leslie *	unopposed		
Registered electors				
Conservative hold		Swing		

=== Garston ===
No. 30 Garston
Party	Candidate	Votes	%	±%
Ind. Conservative	Edward Wrake Turner	993	38%	
Ind. Conservative	Frederick James Rawlinson	891	34%	
Liberal	James Picthall	750	29%	
Conservative	Thomas Semmens	593	23%	
Conservative	George Washington Hughes	568	22%	
Independent	Michael Somers	249	10%	
Majority				
Registered electors				
Turnout		2,585		
Ind. Conservative win (new seat)				
Ind. Conservative win (new seat)				
Liberal win (new seat)				

As Edward Wrake Turner received the highest number of seats his term of office was due to expire on 1 November 1905. As Frederick James Rawlinson received the second highest number of seats his term of office was due to expire on 1 November 1904. As James Picthall received the third highest number of seats his term of office was due to expire on 1 November 1903.

=== Granby ===
No. 22 Granby
Party	Candidate	Votes	%	±%
Liberal	John Lea *	unopposed		
Registered electors				
Liberal hold		Swing		

=== Great George ===
No. 20 Great George
Party	Candidate	Votes	%	±%
Liberal	John Lamport Ellis *	704	55%	
	George Allen	582	45%	
Majority		122		
Registered electors				
Turnout		1,286		
Liberal hold		Swing		

=== Kensington ===
No. 11 Kensington
Party	Candidate	Votes	%	±%
Conservative	William Henry Edwardes *	unopposed		
Registered electors				
Conservative hold		Swing		

=== Kirkdale ===
No. 2 Kirkdale
Party	Candidate	Votes	%	±%
Conservative	Dr. John Utting	unopposed		
Registered electors				
Conservative hold		Swing		

=== Low Hill ===
No. 10 Low Hill
Party	Candidate	Votes	%	±%
Conservative	Joseph Quilliam Roby	1,118	68%	
Labour	Nicholas Donovan	518	32%	
Majority		600		
Registered electors				
Turnout		1,636		
Conservative hold		Swing		

=== Netherfield ===
No. 8 Netherfield
Party	Candidate	Votes	%	±%
Conservative	William Watson Rutherford *	1,567	95%	
Independent	Edward Phillips	88	5%	
Majority		1,479		
Registered electors				
Turnout		1,655		
Conservative hold		Swing		

=== North Scotland ===
No. 13 North Scotland
Party	Candidate	Votes	%	±%
Irish Nationalist	Patrick Joseph Daly	unopposed		
Registered electors				
Irish Nationalist hold		Swing		

=== Prince's Park ===
No. 23 Prince's Park
Party	Candidate	Votes	%	±%
Liberal	Acheson Lyle Rupert Rathbone	1,347	57%	
Conservative	Walter William Thomas *	1,032	43%	
Majority		315		
Registered electors				
Turnout		2,379		
Liberal gain from Conservative		Swing		

=== Sandhills ===
No. 1 Sandhills
Party	Candidate	Votes	%	±%
Liberal and Irish Nationalist	Patrick Joseph Deery *	unopposed		
Registered electors				
Irish Nationalist hold		Swing		

=== St. Anne's ===
No. 17 St. Anne's
Party	Candidate	Votes	%	±%
Conservative	Julius Jacobs	1,058	50%	
Liberal	John Clancy	1,055	50%	
Majority		1,058		
Registered electors				
Turnout		2,113		
Conservative hold		Swing		

=== St. Domingo ===
No. 7 St. Domingo
Party	Candidate	Votes	%	±%
Conservative	Joseph Bennett Colton *	unopposed		
Registered electors				
Conservative hold		Swing		

=== St. Peter's ===
No. 19 St. Peter's
Party	Candidate	Votes	%	±%
Liberal	Alexander Armour	371	95%	
Independent	John Grimes	19	5%	
Majority		352		
Registered electors				
Turnout		390		
Liberal hold		Swing		

=== Sefton Park East ===
No. 24A Sefton Park East
Party	Candidate	Votes	%	±%
Liberal	Wilfrid Bowring Stoddart	1,188	52%	
Conservative	Dr. Richard Caton	1,092	48%	
Majority		96		
Registered electors				
Turnout		2,280		
Liberal gain from Conservative		Swing		

=== Sefton Park West ===
No. 24 Sefton Park West
Party	Candidate	Votes	%	±%
Conservative	Richard Dart *	unopposed		
Registered electors				
Conservative hold		Swing		

=== South Scotland ===
No. 14 South Scotland
Party	Candidate	Votes	%	±%
Irish Nationalist	Austin Harford *	unopposed		
Registered electors				
Irish Nationalist gain from Independent Irish Nationalist				

=== Vauxhall ===
No. 15 Vauxhall
Party	Candidate	Votes	%	±%
Liberal	Richard Robert Meade-King *	unopposed		
Registered electors				
Liberal hold		Swing		

=== Walton ===
No. 3A Walton
Party	Candidate	Votes	%	±%
Conservative	George Brodrick Smith Brodrick	944	72%	
Independent	Joseph Carleton	355	27%	
Independent	Edward Phillips	7	1%	
Majority		589		
Registered electors				
Turnout		1,306		
Conservative hold		Swing		

=== Warbreck ===
No. 27 Warbreck
Party	Candidate	Votes	%	±%
Conservative	Peter McGuffie	unopposed		
Registered electors				
Conservative win (new seat)				

=== Wavertree ===
No. 5 Wavertree
Party	Candidate	Votes	%	±%
Liberal Unionist	James Willcox Alsop *	unopposed		
Registered electors				
Liberal Unionist hold		Swing		

=== West Derby ===
No. 28 West Derby
Party	Candidate	Votes	%	±%
Liberal	Thomas Utley *	unopposed		
Registered electors				
Liberal hold		Swing		

== Aldermanic Election ==
It was reported to the council on 9 November 1902 that Garston Urban District Council had nominated John Ernest Tinne (Aigburth ward) and William Newall (Garston ward) to be aldermen. These two were duly elected as aldermen by the councillors and aldermen on 9 November 1902.

Party	Alderman	Ward	Term expires	Ward
	John Ernest Tinne	No. 29 Aigburth		Aigburth
	William Newall	No.30 Garston		Garston

== By-elections ==
=== No.13, North Scotland, 17 December 1902 ===
Caused by the death of Councillor James Daly (Irish Nationalist, North Scotland, elected 1 November 1900) on 18 November 1902 was reported to the Council on 29 November 1902.

No. 13 North Scotland
Party	Candidate	Votes	%	±%
	Thomas Kelly	690	58%	
	Patrick Toner	487	41%	
	Hugh O'Donnell	11	1%	
Majority		203		
Registered electors				
Turnout		1,188		
		Swing		

=== No. 12, Edge Hill, 30 January 1903 ===
Caused by the death of Councillor Samuel Wasse Higginbottom MP (Conservative, elected 1 November 1902) on 28 December 1902.

No. 12 Edge Hill
Party	Candidate	Votes	%	±%
Conservative	Henry Sharrock Higginbottom	1,693	71%	
Labour	Robert Clement Faulkener	668	28%	
	Edward Phillips	9	0.004%	
Majority		1,025		
Registered electors				
Turnout		2,370		
Conservative hold		Swing		

=== No. 29 Aigburth, 30 April 1903 ===
Caused by the resignation of Alderman John Ernest Tinne (elected 9 November 1902), which was reported to the council on 4 March 1903.

Councillor William Hall Jowett (Conservative, Aigburth, elected 1 November 1902) was elected as an alderman by the council (councillors and aldermen) on 1 April 1903 .

No. 29 Aigburth
Party	Candidate	Votes	%	±%
Conservative	John Salmon	unopposed		
Registered electors				
Conservative hold		Swing		

=== No.16, Exchange, 15 June 1903 ===
The death of Alderman James Ruddin occurred on 21 April 1903 was reported to the Council on 6 May 1903. His place was taken by Councillor Edmond Brownbill (Liberal. Exchange, elected 1 November 1902) was elected as an alderman by the council (Councillors and Aldermen) on 3 June 1903.

No. 16 Exchange
Party	Candidate	Votes	%	±%
Liberal	Alexander Allan Paton	unopposed		
Registered electors				
Liberal hold		Swing		

=== No.3 Anfield, 26 May 1903 ===
The death of Councillor John Valentine Smith (Conservative, Anfield elected 10 May 1901) on 1 May 1903 was reported to the council on 6 May 1903

No. 3 Anfield
Party	Candidate	Votes	%	±%
Liberal	Henry Jones	759	56%	
	Charles Henry Rutherford	601	44%	
Majority		158		
Registered electors				
Turnout		1,360		
Liberal gain from Conservative		Swing		

=== No.26, Dingle, 15 June 1903 ===
Caused by the resignation of Councillor Austin Taylor MP (Conservative, Dingle, elected 1 November 1902)

No. 26 Dingle
Party	Candidate	Votes	%	±%
Conservative	Dr. Richard Caton			
Registered electors				
Conservative hold		Swing		

=== No.30, Garston, 27 July 1903 ===
The death of Alderman William Newall on 5 June 1903 was reported to the Council on 10 June 1903.

In his place, Councillor Edward Wrake Turner (Independent Conservative, Garston, elected 1 November 1902) was elected as an alderman by the council (councillors and aldermen) on 1 July 1903. .

No. 30 Garston
Party	Candidate	Votes	%	±%
Conservative	George Washington Hughes	unopposed		
Registered electors				
Conservative gain from Ind. Conservative		Swing		

=== No. Sandhills, 6 August 1903 ===
The death of Councillor Thomas Salter (Liberal, Sandhills, elected 1 November 1901) on 5 July 1903 was reported to the council on 5 August 1903.

No. 1 Sandhills
Party	Candidate	Votes	%	±%
	Thomas Owen Ruddin	956		
	George James Smith	691		
Majority		265		
Registered electors				
Turnout		1,647		
		Swing		

=== No.21, Abercromby, ===
Caused by the death of Councillor Lorents Braun Haddock (Conservative, Abercromby, elected 1 November 1900) on 21 August 1903, which was reported to the Council on 2 September 1903.

No. 21 Abercromby
Party	Candidate	Votes	%	±%
Majority				
Registered electors				
Turnout				
	gain from	Swing		

== See also ==
- Liverpool City Council
- Liverpool Town Council elections 1835 - 1879
- Liverpool City Council elections 1880–present
- Mayors and Lord Mayors of Liverpool 1207 to present
- History of local government in England
