= 1912 Liverpool City Council election =

Liverpool City Council elections 1912

← 1911	November 1, 1912	1913 →

34 seats were up for election (one third): one seat for each of the 34 wards 69 (incl. Aldermen) seats needed for a majority

Elections to Liverpool City Council were held on Friday 1 November 1912.

18 of the 34 seats were uncontested.

After the election, the composition of the council was:

Party	Councillors	±	Aldermen	Total
Conservative	??	+1	??	82
Liberal	??	-1	??	31
Irish Nationalist	??	0	3	14
Labour	??	0	0	7
Independent	??	0	0	1
Protestant	??	0	0	??

== Election result ==
Liverpool local election result 1912
Party	Seats	Gains	Losses	Net gain/loss	Seats %	Votes %	Votes	+/−
Conservative	22	1	0	+1	65%	62%	20,564	
Liberal	6	0	1	-1	18%	3.2%	1,063	
Irish Nationalist	5	0	0	0	15%	0%	0	
Protestant	1	0	0	0	3%	3.7%	1,230	
Labour	0	0	0	0	0%	22%	7,253	

== Ward results ==
* - Retiring Councillor seeking re-election

Comparisons are made with the 1909 election results, as the retiring councillors were elected in that year.

=== Abercromby ===
No. 21 Abercromby
Party	Candidate	Votes	%	±%
Conservative	Edward Lawrence *	unopposed		
Registered electors				
Conservative hold		Swing		

=== Aigburth ===
No. 29 Aigburth
Party	Candidate	Votes	%	±%
Conservative	Henry Morley Miller	unopposed		
Registered electors				
Conservative gain from Liberal		Swing		

=== Anfield ===
No. 3 Anfield
Party	Candidate	Votes	%	±%
Liberal	Henry Jones *	unopposed		
Registered electors				
Liberal hold		Swing		

=== Breckfield ===
No. 6 Breckfield
Party	Candidate	Votes	%	±%
Conservative	Alfred Griffiths	1,339	64%	
Labour	Robert Donaldson	738	36%	
Majority		601		
Registered electors		4,176		
Turnout		2,077	50%	
Conservative hold		Swing		

=== Brunswick ===
No. 25 Brunswick
Party	Candidate	Votes	%	±%
Irish Nationalist	John Alfred Kelly *	unopposed		
Registered electors				
Irish Nationalist hold		Swing		

=== Castle Street ===
No. 18 Castle Street
Party	Candidate	Votes	%	±%
Conservative	James Willcox Alsop *	unopposed		
Registered electors				
Conservative hold		Swing		

=== Dingle ===
No. 26 Dingle
Party	Candidate	Votes	%	±%
Conservative	Thomas Charles Huxley	2,012	70%	
Labour	John Frederick Bower	860	30%	
Majority		1,152		
Registered electors		5,747		
Turnout		2,872	50%	
Conservative hold		Swing		

=== Edge Hill ===
No. 12 Edge Hill
Party	Candidate	Votes	%	±%
Conservative	Reginald Jaeger Clarke *	1,444	58%	
Labour	Arthur Hawkes	1,064	42%	
Majority		380		
Registered electors		4,744		
Turnout		2,508	53%	
Conservative hold		Swing		

=== Everton ===
No. 9 Everton
Party	Candidate	Votes	%	±%
Conservative	Richard Rutherford *	1,230	67%	
Labour	Robert Dixon	616	33%	
Majority		614		
Registered electors		4,197		
Turnout		1,846	44%	
Conservative hold		Swing		

=== Exchange ===
No. 16 Exchange
Party	Candidate	Votes	%	±%
Conservative	John Sutherland Harmood Banner MP *	Unopposed	N/A	N/A
Registered electors				
Conservative hold				

=== Fairfield ===
No. Fairfield
Party	Candidate	Votes	%	±%
Liberal	Francis L'Estrange Joseph *	unopposed		
Registered electors				
Liberal hold		Swing		

=== Garston ===
No. 30 Garston
Party	Candidate	Votes	%	±%
Conservative	Joshua Burrow *	1,127	60%	
Labour	Joseph Cleary	757	40%	
Majority		370		
Registered electors		2,270		
Turnout		1,884	83%	
Conservative hold		Swing		

=== Granby ===
No. 22 Granby
Party	Candidate	Votes	%	±%
Liberal	Joseph Harrison Jones *	unopposed		
Registered electors				
Liberal hold		Swing		

=== Great George ===
No. 20 Great George
Party	Candidate	Votes	%	±%
Conservative	William Muirhead *	656	55%	
Liberal	Dr. William Henry Broad	529	45%	
Majority		127		
Registered electors		1,607		
Turnout		1,185	74%	
Conservative hold		Swing		

=== Kensington ===
No. 11 Kensington
Party	Candidate	Votes	%	±%
Conservative	Robert Lowry Burns *	1,718	61%	
Labour	Arthur Kilpin Bulley	1,117	39%	
Majority		601	22%	
Registered electors		4,712		
Turnout		2,835	60%	
Conservative hold		Swing		

=== Kirkdale ===
No. 2 Kirkdale
Party	Candidate	Votes	%	±%
Conservative	Albert Buckley	1,832	61%	
Labour	James Clayton	1,151	39%	
Majority		681	22%	
Registered electors		6,401		
Turnout		2,983	47%	
Conservative hold		Swing		

=== Low Hill ===
No. 10 Low Hill
Party	Candidate	Votes	%	±%
Conservative	Dr. Francis William Bailey *	1,129	59%	
Labour	Alexander Broom	769	41%	
Majority		360		
Registered electors		3,772		
Turnout		1,898	51%	
Conservative hold		Swing		

=== Netherfield ===
No. 8 Netherfield
Party	Candidate	Votes	%	±%
Protestant	John Walker *	1,230	63%	
Conservative	William Edward McLachlan	717	37%	
Majority		513		
Registered electors		3,841		
Turnout		1,947	51%	
Protestant hold		Swing		

=== North Scotland ===
No. 13 North Scotland
Party	Candidate	Votes	%	±%
Irish Nationalist	John Clancy *	unopposed		
Registered electors				
Irish Nationalist hold		Swing		

=== Old Swan ===
No. 28A Old Swan
Party	Candidate	Votes	%	±%
Conservative	James Wilson Walker *	1,116	65%	
Labour	Joseph Mooney	588	35%	
Majority		528		
Registered electors		3,841		
Turnout		1,704	46%	
Conservative hold		Swing		

=== Prince's Park ===
No. 23 Prince's Park
Party	Candidate	Votes	%	±%
Conservative	David Jackson	unopposed		
Registered electors				
Conservative hold		Swing		

=== Sandhills ===
No. 1 Sandhills
Party	Candidate	Votes	%	±%
Irish Nationalist	Thomas Wafer Byrne	unopposed		
Registered electors				
Irish Nationalist hold		Swing		

=== St. Anne's ===
No. 17 St. Anne's
Party	Candidate	Votes	%	±%
Liberal	Philip Durning Holt	unopposed		
Registered electors				
Liberal hold		Swing		

=== St. Domingo ===
No. 7 St. Domingo
Party	Candidate	Votes	%	±%
Conservative	William Herbert Moore	1,382	72%	
Labour	James Murphy	535	28%	
Majority		847		
Registered electors		4,394		
Turnout		1,917	44%	
Conservative hold		Swing		

=== St. Peter's ===
No. 19 St. Peter's
Party	Candidate	Votes	%	±%
Conservative	Henry Alexander Cole	596	53%	
Liberal	Thomas Shaw *	533	47%	
Majority		63		
Registered electors		1,605		
Turnout		1,129	70%	
Conservative hold		Swing		

=== Sefton Park East ===
No. 24A Sefton Park East
Party	Candidate	Votes	%	±%
Liberal	Alexander Allan Paton *	unopposed		
Registered electors				
Liberal hold		Swing		

=== Sefton Park West ===
No. 24 Sefton Park West
Party	Candidate	Votes	%	±%
Liberal	Herbert Reynolds Rathbone *	unopposed		
Registered electors				
Liberal hold		Swing		

=== South Scotland ===
No. 14 South Scotland
Party	Candidate	Votes	%	±%
Irish Nationalist	John O'Shea *	unopposed		
Registered electors				
Irish Nationalist hold		Swing		

=== Vauxhall ===
No. 15 Vauxhall
Party	Candidate	Votes	%	±%
Irish Nationalist	Thomas Burke *	unopposed		
Registered electors				
Irish Nationalist hold		Swing		

=== Walton ===
No. 3a Walton
Party	Candidate	Votes	%	±%
Conservative	Richard Pritchard *	1,694	71%	
Labour	Harry Dixon Large	692	29%	
Majority		1,002		
Registered electors		5,181		
Turnout		2,386	46%	
Conservative hold		Swing		

=== Warbreck ===
No. 27 Warbreck
Party	Candidate	Votes	%	±%
Conservative	Robert Charles Herman *	1,436	72%	
Labour	John Lowry	549	28%	
Majority		887		
Registered electors		4,183		
Turnout		1,985	47%	
Conservative hold		Swing		

=== Wavertree ===
No. 5 Wavertree
Party	Candidate	Votes	%	±%
Conservative	George Bowler *	unopposed		
Registered electors				
Conservative hold		Swing		

=== Wavertree West ===
No. 5A Wavertree West
Party	Candidate	Votes	%	±%
Conservative	Alfred Parsons	1,136	57%	
Labour	William Augustus Colcutt	854	43%	
Majority		282		
Registered electors		3,673		
Turnout		1,990	54%	
Conservative hold		Swing		

=== West Derby ===
No. 28 West Derby
Party	Candidate	Votes	%	±%
Conservative	William Henry Parkinson *	unopposed		
Registered electors				
Conservative hold		Swing		

== Aldermanic Elections ==
=== Aldermanic Election 9 November 1912 ===
Caused by the death of Alderman William Humphrey Williams (Conservative, elected as an alderman on 9 November 1910) on 11 August 1912. In his place Councillor John Lea (Liberal, Granby, elected 1 November 1911) was elected as an alderman by the councillors on 9 November 1912.

Party	Alderman	Ward	Term expires
Conservative	John Lea	No. 7 St. Domingo	1916

.

=== Aldermanic Election, 8 January 1913 ===
Caused by the resignation of Alderman Edward Grindley (Conservative, last elected as an alderman on 9 November 1907). In his place Councillor Frank John Leslie (Conservative, Breckfield, elected 1 November 1911) was elected as an alderman by the councillors on 8 January 1913

Party	Alderman	Ward	Term expires
Conservative	Frank John Leslie	No.2 Kirkdale	1913

=== Aldermanic Election, 5 March 1913 ===
Cause ?

Councillor Hartley Wilson (Conservative, Aigburth, elected 1 November 1911) was elected as an alderman by the councillors on 5 Mar 1913.

Party	Alderman	Ward	Term expires
Conservative	Hartley Wilson	No. 10 Low Hill	191?

=== Aldermanic Election, 2 July 1913 ===
Caused by the resignation of Alderman Andrew Commins (Irish Nationalist, elected 9 November 1910) which was reported to the Council on 4 June 1913 .

In his place Councillor George Jeremy Lynskey (Irish Nationalist, North Scotland, elected 1 November 1910) was elected as an alderman by the councillors on 2 July 1913.

Party	Alderman	Ward	Term expires
Irish Nationalist	George Jeremy Lynskey	No. 15 Vauxhall	1916

=== Aldermanic Election 30 July 1913 ===
Caused by the resignation of Alderman William Watson Rutherford MP (Conservative, elected 9 November 1907) was reported to the Council on 2 July 1913 In his place Councillor John Utting (Conservative, Kirkdale, elected 1 November 1912) was elected as an alderman by the Council on 30 July 1913.

Party	Alderman	Ward	Term expires
Conservative	John Utting		1913

=== Aldermanic Election ===
Caused by the death of Alderman William Oulton (Conservative, elected 9 November 1907) on 27 September 1913 which was reported to the Council on 1 October 1913

In his place

== By-Elections ==
=== No. 22 Granby, 27 November 1912 ===
Caused by the election to alderman of Councillor John Lea (Liberal, Granby, elected unopposed 1 November 1911) on 9 November 1912

No. 22 Granby
Party	Candidate	Votes	%	±%
Conservative	James Waterworth	978	44%	
	John Parry Edwards	664	30%	
	Arthur Kilpin Bulley	577	26%	
Majority		314	14%	N/A
Registered electors				
Turnout		2,219		
Conservative gain from Liberal		Swing		

=== No. 6 Breckfield, 29 January 1913 ===
Caused by Councillor Frank John Leslie (Conservative, Breckfield, elected 1 November 1911) being elected as an alderman by the Council on 8 January 1913.

No. 6 Breckfield
Party	Candidate	Votes	%	±%
Conservative	Edward Powell	966	53%	
	William Charles Clothier	495	27%	
Labour	Robert Donaldson	372	20%	
Majority		471		
Registered electors		4,176		
Turnout		1,833	44%	
Conservative hold		Swing		

=== No. 3A Walton, 17 March 1913 ===
Caused by the death of Councillor Sampson Gannon (Conservative, Walton, elected 1 November 1911) on 19 January 1913.

No. 3a Walton
Party	Candidate	Votes	%	±%
Conservative	James Conrad Cross	1,106	%	
	James Hughes	763	%	
Majority		343		
Registered electors		5,181		
Turnout		1,869	%	
Conservative hold		Swing		

=== No. 21 Abercromby, 18 March 1913 ===
Caused by the death of Councillor Thomas James Smith junr. (Conservative, Abercromby, elected 1 November 1910)

No. 21 Abercromby
Party	Candidate	Votes	%	±%
	Francis James Strong Heaney	unopposed		
Registered electors				
	gain from	Swing		

=== No. 29 Aigburth, 18 March 1913 ===
Caused by Councillor Hartley Wilson (Conservative, Aigburth, elected 1 November 1911) being elected as an alderman by the Council on 5 March 1913.

No. 29 Aigburth
Party	Candidate	Votes	%	±%
Conservative	William James Burgess	unopposed		
Registered electors				
Conservative hold		Swing		

The Term of Office to expire on 1 November 1914.

=== No. 31 Fazakerley, 19 March 1913 ===
Caused by the resignation of Councillor Dr. Henry Herbert Clarke (Conservative, Fazakerley, elected 1 November 1911) .

No. 31 Fazakerley
Party	Candidate	Votes	%	±%
Conservative	George Brodrick Smith-Brodrick	unopposed		
Registered electors		752		
Conservative hold		Swing		

=== No. 5A Wavertree West, 8 April 1913 ===
Caused by the resignation of Councillor Edmund Gerson Jackson (Conservative, Wavertree West, elected 1 November 1911)

No. 5A Wavertree West
Party	Candidate	Votes	%	±%
Conservative	Dennis Benjamin Seaman	901	%	
	Clement Freeman	604	%	
Majority		297		
Registered electors		3,673		
Turnout		1,505	%	
Conservative hold		Swing		

=== No. 13 North Scotland, 15 July 1913 ===
Caused by Councillor George Jeremy Lynskey (Irish Nationalist, North Scotland, elected 1 November 1910) being elected as an alderman by the Council on 2 July 1913.

No. 13 North Scotland
Party	Candidate	Votes	%	±%
Irish Nationalist	William John Loughrey	unopposed		
Registered electors				
Irish Nationalist hold		Swing		

The Term of Office to expire on 1 November 1913

=== No. 2 Kirkdale, 14 October 1913 ===
Caused by the election as an alderman of Councillor John Utting (Conservative, Kirkdale, elected 1 November 1912) on 30 July 1913.

No. 2 Kirkdale
Party	Candidate	Votes	%	±%
Conservative	John Lucas Rankin	1,304	61%	
Labour	James Clayton	846	39%	
Majority		458		
Registered electors		6,401		
Turnout		2,150	34%	
Conservative hold		Swing		

=== No. 4 Fairfield, 14 October 1913 ===
Caused by Councillor Francis L'Estrange Joseph (Liberal, Fairfield, elected 1 November 1912) ceasing to be a councillor.

No. 4 Fairfield
Party	Candidate	Votes	%	±%
Liberal	Joseph Lucas	956	%	
	John Waterworth	861	%	
Majority		509		
Registered electors		3,991		
Turnout		1,817	46%	
Liberal hold		Swing		

== See also ==
- Liverpool City Council
- Liverpool Town Council elections 1835 - 1879
- Liverpool City Council elections 1880–present
- Mayors and Lord Mayors of Liverpool 1207 to present
- History of local government in England
