= 1903 Liverpool City Council election =

English local election

← 1902	2 November 1903	1904 →
	Conservative	Liberal	Irish
Party	Conservative	Liberal	Irish Nationalist
	Liberal Unionist	Protestant
Party	Liberal Unionist	Protestant Party
Council Leader before election
Conservative
Council Leader after election
Conservative

Elections to Liverpool City Council were held on Monday 2 November 1903.

Wavertree West was a new ward with 1 seat elected.

All three seats in each of the Wavertree and West Derby wards were contested.

This was the first Liverpool City Council election that the Liverpool Protestant Party took part. Protestant candidates stood in four wards, Breckfield, Garston, Kirkdale and St. Domingo. Three of these wards, Garston, Kirkdale and St. Domingo returned Protestant councillors.

Of the 38 seats up for election, 14 were not contested.

After the election, the composition of the council was:

Party	Councillors	±	Aldermen	Total
Conservative	??	-4	??	??
Liberal	??	+2	??	??
Irish Nationalist	??	+2	??	??
Protestant	3	+3	0	3
Irish Nationalist & Liberal	1	+1	0	1
Independent	??	??	??	??

== Election result ==
Liverpool local election result 1903
Party	Seats	Gains	Losses	Net gain/loss	Seats %	Votes %	Votes	+/−
Conservative	20	2	6	-4	53%			
Liberal	10	3	1	+2	26%			
Irish Nationalist	4	2	0	+2	11%			
Protestant	3	3	0	+3	7.9%			
Irish Nationalist and Liberal	1	1	0	+1	2.6%			
Labour Repr. Cmte.								
Independent								

In view of the significant number of uncontested seats (14 of 38), these statistics should be taken in that context.

== Ward results ==
* - Retiring Councillor seeking re-election

Comparisons are made with the 1900 election results, as the retiring councillors were elected in that year.

=== Abercromby ===
No. 21 Abercromby
Party	Candidate	Votes	%	±%
Conservative	Dr. Charles Alexander Hill	737	50.1%	
Liberal	Richard George Hough	734	49.9%	
Majority		3		
Registered electors		2,796		
Turnout		1,471	53%	
Conservative hold		Swing		

=== Aigburth ===
No. 29 Aigburth
Party	Candidate	Votes	%	±%
Conservative	John Salmon *	unopposed		
Registered electors				
Conservative hold		Swing		

=== Anfield ===
No. 3 Anfield
Party	Candidate	Votes	%	±%
Liberal	Henry Jones	unopposed		
Registered electors				
Liberal gain from Conservative		Swing		

=== Breckfield ===
No. 6 Breckfield
Party	Candidate	Votes	%	±%
Conservative	John Duncan *	1,200	50.02%	
Protestant	Dr. John Percy Waddy	1,199	49.98%	
Majority		1		
Registered electors		4,196		
Turnout		2,399	57%	
Conservative hold		Swing		

=== Brunswick ===
No. 25 Brunswick
Party	Candidate	Votes	%	±%
Irish Nationalist and Liberal	John Alfred Kelly	994	55%	
Conservative	James Maddrell	804	45%	
Majority		190		
Registered electors		2,961		
Turnout		1,798	61%	
Irish Nationalist and Liberal Party (UK) gain from Liberal				

=== Castle Street ===
No. 18 Castle Street
Party	Candidate	Votes	%	±%
Conservative	John Thomas Wood *	586	59%	
Liberal	Henry Baker Wyatt	409	41%	
Majority		177		
Registered electors		2,130		
Turnout		995	47%	
Conservative hold		Swing		

=== Dingle ===
No. 26 Dingle
Party	Candidate	Votes	%	±%
Conservative	Alfred Stephen Collard *	1,159	72%	
Liberal	Cæsar Alfred Mudie	446	28%	
Majority		713		
Registered electors		5,249		
Turnout		1,605	31%	
Conservative hold		Swing		

=== Edge Hill ===
No. 12 Edge Hill
Party	Candidate	Votes	%	±%
Conservative	William Edward Parry	1,417	50%	
Independent	Arthur Grove Wragg	749	26%	
Labour	Samuel Reeves	676	24%	
Majority		668		
Registered electors		4,999		
Turnout		2,842	57%	
Conservative hold		Swing		

=== Everton ===
No. 9 Everton
Party	Candidate	Votes	%	±%
Conservative	Edward Lewis Lloyd *	1,424	56%	
Liberal	Robert Roberts	974	38%	
Ind. Conservative	Edward Forrester	156	6%	
Majority		450		
Registered electors		4,672		
Turnout		2,554	55%	
Conservative hold		Swing		

=== Exchange ===
No. 16 Exchange
Party	Candidate	Votes	%	±%
Conservative	John Sutherland Harmood-Banner *	424	80%	
Independent	Edward Phillips	101	19%	
Independent	John Hughes	7	1%	
Majority		323		
Registered electors		1,643		
Turnout		532	32%	
Conservative hold		Swing		

=== Fairfield ===
No. 4 Fairfield
Party	Candidate	Votes	%	±%
Liberal	Francis L'Estrange Joseph	1,323	71%	
Conservative	George Harold Jäger	550	29%	
Majority		773		
Registered electors		3,384		
Turnout		1,873		
Liberal gain from Conservative		Swing		

=== Garston ===
No. 30 Garston
Party	Candidate	Votes	%	±%
Protestant	Frederick Maddocks	631	39%	
Liberal	James Pickthall *	510	32%	
Conservative	Joseph Matthews	458	35%	
Majority		121		
Registered electors		1,913		
Turnout		1,599	84%	
Protestant gain from Liberal		Swing		

=== Granby ===
No. 22 Granby
Party	Candidate	Votes	%	±%
Liberal	Joseph Harrison Jones *	1,188	54%	
Conservative	Alexander Henderson	1,016	46%	
Majority		172		
Registered electors		3,899		
Turnout		2,204	57%	
Liberal hold		Swing		

=== Great George ===
No. 20 Great George
Party	Candidate	Votes	%	±%
Conservative	William Muirhead *	800	59%	
Liberal	John Henderson	551	41%	
Majority		249		
Registered electors		1,833		
Turnout		1,351	74%	
Conservative hold		Swing		

=== Kensington ===
No. 11 Kensington
Party	Candidate	Votes	%	±%
Conservative	Edward Burns *	unopposed		
Registered electors				
Conservative hold		Swing		

=== Kirkdale ===
No. 2 Kirkdale
Party	Candidate	Votes	%	±%
Protestant	David Henry Grant	2,424	61%	
Conservative	Edward Russell Taylor *	1,526	39%	
Majority		898		
Registered electors		6,302		
Turnout		3,950	63%	
Protestant gain from Conservative		Swing		

=== Low Hill ===
No. 10 Low Hill
Party	Candidate	Votes	%	±%
Conservative	David Alexander McNeight *	unopposed		
Registered electors				
Conservative hold		Swing		

=== Netherfield ===
No. 8 Netherfield
Party	Candidate	Votes	%	±%
Conservative	Simon Jude *	1,648	69%	
Liberal	William Harrop	731	31%	
Majority		917		
Registered electors		4,200		
Turnout		2,379	57%	
Conservative hold		Swing		

=== North Scotland ===
No. 13 North Scotland
Party	Candidate	Votes	%	±%
Irish Nationalist	Thomas Kelly	unopposed		
Registered electors				
Irish Nationalist hold		Swing		

=== Old Swan ===
No. 28A Old Swan
Party	Candidate	Votes	%	±%
Conservative	James Wilson Walker	723	56%	
Liberal	William Ramsden	577	44%	
Majority		146		
Registered electors		2,168		
Turnout		1,300	60%	
Conservative win (new seat)				

=== Prince's Park ===
No. 23 Prince's Park
Party	Candidate	Votes	%	±%
Conservative	Harold Chaloner Dowdall *	1,206	53%	
Liberal	Max Muspratt	1,090	47%	
Majority		116		
Registered electors		3,723		
Turnout		2,296	62%	
Conservative hold		Swing		

=== Sandhills ===
No. 1 Sandhills
Party	Candidate	Votes	%	±%
Irish Nationalist	Michael Edward Kearney	1,081	54%	
Conservative	David Henry Grant *	911	46%	
Majority		170		
Registered electors		3,339		
Turnout		1,992	60%	
Irish Nationalist gain from Conservative		Swing		

=== St. Anne's ===
No. 17 St. Anne's
Party	Candidate	Votes	%	±%
Liberal	George King *	unopposed		
Registered electors				
Liberal hold		Swing		

=== St. Domingo ===
No. 7 St. Domingo
Party	Candidate	Votes	%	±%
Protestant	William Gilbert	1,627	59%	
Conservative	Robert Alfred Hampson *	1,102	40%	
Independent	Patrick Arthur Loftus	9	0.33%	
Majority		525		
Registered electors		4,582		
Turnout		2,738	60%	
Protestant gain from Conservative		Swing		

=== St. Peter's ===
No. 19 St. Peter's
Party	Candidate	Votes	%	±%
Liberal	William Crossfield *	unopposed		
Registered electors				
Liberal hold		Swing		

=== Sefton Park East ===
No. 24A Sefton Park East
Party	Candidate	Votes	%	±%
Liberal	John Japp *	unopposed		
Registered electors				
Liberal hold		Swing		

=== Sefton Park West ===
No. 24 Sefton Park West
Party	Candidate	Votes	%	±%
Liberal	Herbert Reynolds Rathbone *	unopposed		
Registered electors				
Liberal hold		Swing		

=== South Scotland ===
No. 14 South Scotland
Party	Candidate	Votes	%	±%
Irish Nationalist	John O'Shea *	unopposed		
Registered electors				
Irish Nationalist gain from Independent Irish Nationalist		Swing		

=== Vauxhall ===
No. 15 Vauxhall
Party	Candidate	Votes	%	±%
Irish Nationalist	Thomas Burke *	unopposed		
Registered electors				
Irish Nationalist hold		Swing		

=== Walton ===
No. 3A Walton
Party	Candidate	Votes	%	±%
Conservative	John Brunskill	1,257	62%	
Liberal	Alfred Thomas Davies	775	38%	
Majority		482		
Registered electors		3,859		
Turnout		2,032	53%	
Conservative hold		Swing		

=== Warbreck ===
No. 27 Warbreck
Party	Candidate	Votes	%	±%
Conservative	John Harvey Farmer *	262	95%	
Independent	Patrick Cullen	15	5%	
Majority		247		
Registered electors		2,722		
Turnout		277	10%	
Conservative hold		Swing		

=== Wavertree ===
No. 5 Wavertree - 3 seats
Party	Candidate	Votes	%	±%
Conservative	Arthur Crosthwaite	unopposed		
Liberal	Charles Clarke Morrison	unopposed		
Conservative	Robert Stephen Porter	unopposed		
Registered electors				
Conservative hold		Swing		
Conservative hold		Swing		
Liberal gain from Conservative		Swing		

=== Wavertree West ===
No. 5A Wavertree West
Party	Candidate	Votes	%	±%
Conservative	Charles Henry Rutherford	1,091	54%	
Liberal	Charles Allcot Whitney	947	46%	
Majority		144		
Registered electors		3,315		
Turnout		2,038	61%	
Conservative win (new seat)				

=== West Derby ===
No. 28 West Derby - 3 seats
Party	Candidate	Votes	%	±%
Liberal	Thomas Shaw	831	52%	
Liberal	Samuel Skelton	827	51%	
Conservative	Robert Edward Walkington Stephenson	780	48%	
Liberal	John Lyon Langford	769	48%	
Conservative	David Scott	616	38%	
Conservative	George James Smith	584	36%	
Majority		51		
Registered electors		2,619		
Turnout		1,611	62%	
Liberal hold		Swing		
Liberal hold		Swing		
Conservative hold		Swing		

== Aldermanic Elections ==
The Council (Councillors and Aldermen) elected Councillor William Edward Willink (Conservative, Prince's Park, elected 1 November 1901) as an Alderman for the new ward of Wavertree West on 9 November 1903

Councillor Jacob Reuben Grant (Conservative, Walton, elected 1 November 1901) was elected by the Council as an alderman for the new ward of Old Swan on 9 November 1903.

Party	Alderman	Ward	Term expires
Conservative	Jacob Reuben Grant	No. 28A Old Swan	1904
Conservative	William Edward Willink	No. 5A Wavertree West	1907

- The death of Alderman Herbert Campbell (Conservative) on 7 December 1903 was reported to the Council on 9 December 1903. His position was filled when Councillor Robert Alfred Hampson (Conservative, Aigburth, elected 19 November 1903) was elected as an alderman by the Council on 3 February 1904.

Party	Alderman	Ward	Term expires
Conservative	Robert Alfred Hampson	No. 20 Great George	1907

- The resignation of Alderman Dr. Thomas Clarke was reported to the Council on 9 November 1903. Councillor Edward Burns (Conservative, Kensington, elected 2 November 1903) was elected as an alderman by the Council on 2 December 1903.

Party	Alderman	Ward	Term expires
Conservative	Edward Burns	No. 9 Everton	1907

- The resignation of Alderman Alexander Murray Bligh (Irish Nationalist, elected 28 May 1902) was reported to the Council on 9 November 1903. Councillor John Lawrence (Conservative, Castle Street, elected 1 November 1902) was elected as an alderman on 2 December 1903.

Party	Alderman	Ward	Term expires
Conservative	John Lawrence	No. 8 Netherfield	1907

- Councillor John Duncan (Conservative, Breckfield. elected 2 November 1903) was elected as an alderman

Party	Alderman	Ward	Term expires
Conservative	John Duncan	No.	

.

- Following the death of Alderman John Lawrence, Councillor William Oulton (Liberal Unionist, Everton, elected 1 November 1901) was elected as an alderman on 1 June 1904.

Party	Alderman	Ward	Term expires
Conservative	William Oulton	No. 8 Netherfield	1907

- Alderman John Ellison died on 17 October 1904

== By-elections ==
=== No. 3A Walton, 19 November 1903 ===
Caused by the election by the Council of Councillor Jacob Reuben Grant (Conservative, Walton, elected 1 November 1901) as an alderman for the new ward of Old Swan on 9 November 1903.

No. 3A Walton
Party	Candidate	Votes	%	±%
Conservative	Dr. John George Moyles	1,548	67%	
	David John Williams	754	33%	
Majority		794		
Registered electors				
Turnout		2,302		
Conservative hold		Swing		

=== No. 29 Aigburth, 19 November 1903 ===
Caused by the resignation of Councillor Arthur Twiss Kemble (Conservative, Aigburth, elected unopposed 1 November 1902) which was reported to the Council on 9 November 1903.

No. 29 Aigburth
Party	Candidate	Votes	%	±%
Conservative	Robert Albert Hampson	unopposed		
Registered electors				
Conservative hold		Swing		

=== No. 23 Prince's Park, 24 November 1903 ===
Caused by the election by the Council of Councillor William Edward Willink (Conservative, Prince's Park, elected 1 November 1901) as an Alderman on 9 November 1903.

No. 23 Prince's Park
Party	Candidate	Votes	%	±%
Liberal	Max Muspratt	1,101	41%	
	John Lockhart Bailey	857	32%	
	Robert Griffiths	728	27%	
Majority		244		
Registered electors				
Turnout		2,686		
Liberal gain from Conservative		Swing		

=== No. 11 Kensington, 16 December 1903 ===
Caused by the election to Alderman of Councillor Edward Burns (Conservative, Kensington, elected 2 November 1903).

No. 11 Kensington
Party	Candidate	Votes	%	±%
Conservative	Thomas Bland Royden	1,383		
	John Lyon Langford	1,063		
Registered electors				
Conservative hold		Swing		

=== No. 18 Castle Street, 16 December 1903 ===
Caused by the election as alderman of Councillor John Lawrence (Conservative, Castle Street, elected 1 November 1902)

No. 18 Castle Street
Party	Candidate	Votes	%	±%
Liberal	Thomas Augustus Patterson	758	53%	
	Frederick Moreton Radcliffe	685	47%	
Majority		73		
Registered electors		2,130		
Turnout		1,443	68%	
Liberal gain from Conservative		Swing		

=== No. 21 Abercomby, 19 January 1904 ===
Caused by the resignation of Councillor Dr. Charles Alexander Hill (Conservative, Abercromby, elected 2 November 1903) was reported to the Council on 6 January 1904

No. 21 Abercromby
Party	Candidate	Votes	%	±%
Liberal	Charles Allcot Whitney	809	53%	
Conservative	Dr. Charles Alexander Hill *	725	47%	
Majority		84		
Registered electors				
Turnout		1,534		
Liberal gain from Conservative		Swing		

=== No. 3A Walton, 26 February 1904 ===
Caused by the resignation of Councillor John Brunswick (Conservative, Walton, elected 2 November 1903) which was reported to the Council on 10 February 1904.

No. 3A Walton
Party	Candidate	Votes	%	±%
Conservative	Richard Pritchard	unopposed		
Registered electors				
Conservative hold		Swing		

=== No. 29 Aigburth, 26 February 1904 ===
Caused by the election as an alderman of Councillor Robert Alfred Hampson (Conservative, Aigburth, elected 19 November 1903)

No. 29 Aigburth
Party	Candidate	Votes	%	±%
Conservative	Hartley Wilson	unopposed		
Registered electors				
Conservative hold		Swing		

The Term of Office to expire 1 November 1905

=== No. 17 St. Anne's, 17 May 1904 ===
Caused by the resignation of Councillor Julius Jacobs (Conservative, St. Anne's, elected 1 November 1902).

No. 17 St. Anne's
Party	Candidate	Votes	%	±%
Liberal	John Clancy	1,082	58%	
	Edwatd Russel Taylor	677	37%	
	Samuel Maddock	82	4%	
Majority		415		
Registered electors				
Turnout		1,841		
Liberal hold		Swing		

The term of office to expire on 1 November 1905 .

=== No. 6 Breckfield, 26 May 1904 ===
Caused by Councillor John Duncan (Conservative, Breckfield. elected 2 November 1903) being elected as an alderman.

No. 6 Breckfield
Party	Candidate	Votes	%	±%
Conservative	William Herbert Priest	1,123		
	Robert Roberts	999		
Majority		124		
Registered electors				
Turnout		2,122		
Conservative hold		Swing		

The term of office to expire on 1 November 1906 .

=== No. 9 Everton, 15 June 1904 ===
Following the death of Alderman John Lawrence, Councillor William Oulton (Liberal Unionist, Everton, elected 1 November 1901) was elected as an alderman.

No. 9 Everton
Party	Candidate	Votes	%	±%
Conservative	Gerald Kyffin-Taylor	unopposed		
Registered electors		4,672		
Conservative gain from Liberal Unionist		Swing		

=== No. 16 Exchange, 6 October 1904 ===
Councillor Alexander Allan Paton (Liberal, Exchange, elected 15 June 1903) died 8 September 1903

No. 16 Exchange
Party	Candidate	Votes	%	±%
Liberal	Joseph Bibby	510	57%	
	George Broadbridge	386	43%	
Majority		124		
Registered electors		1,643		
Turnout		896	55%	
Liberal hold		Swing		

=== No. 28A Old Swan, 18 October 1904 ===
Caused by the resignation of Councillor Thomas Utley (Liberal, West Derby, elected 1 November 1902), which was reported to the Council on 5 October 1904.

No. 28A Old Swan
Party	Candidate	Votes	%	±%
	John Ellis	612	52%	
	William Ramsden	555	48%	
Majority		57		
Registered electors		2,168		
Turnout		1,167	54%	
	gain from	Swing		

== See also ==
- Liverpool City Council
- Liverpool Town Council elections 1835 – 1879
- Liverpool City Council elections 1880–present
- Mayors and Lord Mayors of Liverpool 1207 to present
- History of local government in England
