= 1922 Liverpool City Council election =

1922 English local government election

- 1 November 1922

36 councillors' seats were up for election

Elections to Liverpool City Council were held on Wednesday 1 November 1922.

One third of the council seats were up for election. The term of office for each councillor being three years.

Thirteen of the thirty-six seats up for election were uncontested.

After the election, the composition of the council was:

| Party | Councillors | ± | Aldermen | Total |
|---|---|---|---|---|
| Conservative | 67 | +9 | 23 | 90 |
| Liberal | 6 | 0 | 3 | 9 |
| Coalition Liberal | 10 | -1 | 4 | 14 |
| Irish Nationalist | 21 | 0 | 3 | 24 |
| Labour | 6 | -6 | 2 | 8 |
| Independent | 4 | +1 | 0 | 4 |

== Election result ==
Liverpool local election result 1922
| Party | Seats | Gains | Losses | Net gain/loss | Seats % | Votes % | Votes | +/− |
|---|---|---|---|---|---|---|---|---|
| Conservative | 23 | 8 | 0 | +8 | 64% | 43% | 50,270 | |
| Irish Nationalist | 7 | 0 | 0 | 0 | 19% | 10% | 9,068 | |
| Liberal | 3 | 1 | 1 | 0 | 8% | 10% | 11,463 | |
| Labour | 1 | 0 | 8 | -8 | | 29% | 33,142 | |
| Patriotic Labour | 1 | 1 | 0 | +1 | 2.8% | 2.6% | 2,999 | |
| Independent Labour | 1 | 1 | 0 | +1 | 2.8% | 1.9% | 2,184 | |
| Ind. Conservative | 0 | 0 | 0 | 0 | 0% | 1.9% | 2,219 | |
| Independent | 0 | 0 | 1 | -1 | 0% | 1.4% | 1,638 | |

== Ward results ==
* - Retiring Councillor seeking re-election

Comparisons are made with the 1919 election results, as the retiring councillors were elected then.

=== Abercromby ===
No. 9 Abercromby
| Party | Candidate | Votes | % | ±% |
|---|---|---|---|---|
| Conservative | Edwin Thompson * | unopposed | | |
| Registered electors | | | | |
| Conservative hold | | Swing | | |

=== Aigburth ===
No. 17 Aigburth
| Party | Candidate | Votes | % | ±% |
|---|---|---|---|---|
| Conservative | Henry Morley Miller * | unopposed | | |
| Registered electors | | | | |
| Conservative hold | | Swing | | |

=== Anfield ===
No. 29 Anfield
| Party | Candidate | Votes | % | ±% |
|---|---|---|---|---|
| Conservative | George Young Williamson | 2,602 | 50% | |
| Liberal | Alfred Gates | 1,510 | 29% | |
| Labour | Fred Robinson | 1,124 | 21% | |
| Majority | | 1,092 | | |
| Registered electors | | 9,243 | | |
| Turnout | | 5,236 | 57% | |
| Conservative gain from Labour | | Swing | | |

=== Breckfield ===
No. 30 Breckfield
| Party | Candidate | Votes | % | ±% |
|---|---|---|---|---|
| Conservative | Edward James Jones | 3,594 | 67% | |
| Labour | Henry Alfred Booth * | 1,611 | 30% | |
| Irish Nationalist | John Gaffney | 121 | 2% | |
| Majority | | 1,983 | | |
| Registered electors | | 9,557 | | |
| Turnout | | 5,326 | 56% | |
| Conservative gain from Labour | | Swing | | |

=== Brunswick ===
No. 11 Brunswick
| Party | Candidate | Votes | % | ±% |
|---|---|---|---|---|
| Irish Nationalist | John Alfred Kelly * | unopposed | | |
| Registered electors | | | | |
| Irish Nationalist hold | | Swing | | |

=== Castle Street ===
No. 7 Castle Street
| Party | Candidate | Votes | % | ±% |
|---|---|---|---|---|
| Conservative | John Sandeman Allen | Unopposed | N/A | N/A |
| Registered electors | | | | |
| Conservative hold | | | | |

=== Dingle ===
No. 12 Dingle
| Party | Candidate | Votes | % | ±% |
|---|---|---|---|---|
| Conservative | William Wallace Kelly * | 4,741 | 53% | |
| Labour | Horace Godden Cole | 4,243 | 47% | |
| Majority | | 498 | | |
| Registered electors | | 13,765 | | |
| Turnout | | 8,984 | 65% | |
| Conservative hold | | Swing | | |

=== Edge Hill ===
No. 18 Edge Hill
| Party | Candidate | Votes | % | ±% |
|---|---|---|---|---|
| Conservative | Robert John Hall | 3,206 | 49% | |
| Labour | Charles Burden * | 2,438 | 38% | |
| Irish Nationalist | William Henry McGuiness | 502 | 8% | |
| Patriotic Labour | Charles Stamper | 345 | 5.3% | |
| Majority | | 768 | | |
| Registered electors | | 13,765 | | |
| Turnout | | 8,984 | 65% | |
| Conservative gain from Labour | | Swing | | |

=== Everton ===
No. 21 Everton
| Party | Candidate | Votes | % | ±% |
|---|---|---|---|---|
| Labour | Henry Walker * | 4,663 | 57% | |
| Conservative | Alfred Michael Urding | 3,542 | 43% | |
| Irish Nationalist | Matthew Grogan | 26 | 0.3% | |
| Independent | James Linge | 11 | 0.1% | |
| Majority | | 1,121 | | |
| Registered electors | | 12,025 | | |
| Turnout | | 8,242 | 69% | |
| Labour hold | | Swing | | |

=== Exchange ===
No. 5 Exchange
| Party | Candidate | Votes | % | ±% |
|---|---|---|---|---|
| Irish Nationalist | Peter Kavanagh * | unopposed | | |
| Registered electors | | | | |
| Irish Nationalist hold | | Swing | | |

=== Fairfield ===
No. 31 Fairfield
| Party | Candidate | Votes | % | ±% |
|---|---|---|---|---|
| Liberal | George Edmund Travis | 2,809 | 61% | |
| National Liberal | Joseph Lucas * | 1,821 | 39% | |
| Majority | | 988 | | |
| Registered electors | | 9,061 | | |
| Turnout | | 4,630 | 51% | |
| Liberal gain from National Liberal | | Swing | | |

=== Fazakerley ===
No. 27 Fazakerley
| Party | Candidate | Votes | % | ±% |
|---|---|---|---|---|
| Conservative | Frank Quayle * | unopposed | | |
| Registered electors | | | | |
| Conservative hold | | Swing | | |

=== Garston ===
No. 37 Garston
| Party | Candidate | Votes | % | ±% |
|---|---|---|---|---|
| Conservative | Edmund Robert Thompson | 1,988 | 57% | |
| Labour | James Henry Dutton * | 1,496 | 43% | |
| Majority | | 492 | | |
| Registered electors | | 5,802 | | |
| Turnout | | 3,484 | 60% | |
| Conservative gain from Labour | | Swing | | |

=== Granby ===
No. 14 Granby
| Party | Candidate | Votes | % | ±% |
|---|---|---|---|---|
| Liberal | Frederick Charles Bowring | 2,283 | 65% | |
| Independent | Robert Tissyman | 1,225 | 35% | |
| Majority | | 1,058 | | |
| Registered electors | | 8,847 | | |
| Turnout | | 3,508 | 40% | |
| Liberal hold | | Swing | | |

=== Great George ===
No. 10 Great George
| Party | Candidate | Votes | % | ±% |
|---|---|---|---|---|
| Irish Nationalist | Thomas Owen Ruddin * | unopposed | | |
| Registered electors | | | | |
| Irish Nationalist hold | | Swing | | |

=== Kensington ===
No. 19 Kensington
| Party | Candidate | Votes | % | ±% |
|---|---|---|---|---|
| Conservative | John Hughes Rutherford | 3,755 | 67% | |
| Labour | Charles Wilson | 1,703 | 31% | |
| Irish Nationalist | Edward John Delaney | 121 | 2% | |
| Majority | | 2,052 | | |
| Registered electors | | 10,548 | | |
| Turnout | | 5,579 | 53% | |
| Conservative gain from Labour | | Swing | | |

=== Kirkdale ===
No. 24 Kirkdale
| Party | Candidate | Votes | % | ±% |
|---|---|---|---|---|
| Conservative | Dr. Robert Garnett Sheldon * | 4,629 | 70% | |
| Labour | Frederick Jones, Senior | 1,903 | 29% | |
| Patriotic Labour | Abraham Slater | 117 | 2% | |
| Majority | | 2,726 | | |
| Registered electors | | 14,890 | | |
| Turnout | | 6,649 | 45% | |
| Conservative hold | | Swing | | |

=== Little Woolton ===
No. 39 Little Woolton
| Party | Candidate | Votes | % | ±% |
|---|---|---|---|---|
| Conservative | Rupert Henry Bremner | unopposed | | |
| Registered electors | | | | |
| Conservative win (new seat) | | | | |

=== Low Hill ===
No. 20 Low Hill
| Party | Candidate | Votes | % | ±% |
|---|---|---|---|---|
| Conservative | Ellis Keyser Yates | 2,978 | 53% | |
| Labour | Thomas Joseph Rowan | 1,530 | 27% | |
| Irish Nationalist | Joseph Loughran | 1,112 | 20% | |
| Majority | | 1,448 | | |
| Registered electors | | 9,851 | | |
| Turnout | | 5,620 | 57% | |
| Conservative gain from Labour | | Swing | | |

=== Netherfield ===
No. 22 Netherfield
| Party | Candidate | Votes | % | ±% |
|---|---|---|---|---|
| Patriotic Labour | John Walker * | 2,654 | 42% | |
| Ind. Conservative | William Edward McLachlan | 2,219 | 35% | |
| Labour | George Chadwick | 1,350 | 22% | |
| Irish Nationalist | Patrick Charles Roche | 55 | 1% | |
| Majority | | 435 | | |
| Registered electors | | 10,745 | | |
| Turnout | | 6,278 | 58% | |
| Patriotic Labour gain from Independent | | | | |

=== North Scotland ===
No. 2 North Scotland
| Party | Candidate | Votes | % | ±% |
|---|---|---|---|---|
| Irish Nationalist | John Clancy * | 2,499 | 55% | |
| Labour | Edward Campbell | 2,011 | 45% | |
| Majority | | 488 | | |
| Registered electors | | 7,549 | | |
| Turnout | | 4,510 | 60% | |
| Irish Nationalist hold | | Swing | | |

=== Old Swan ===
No. 32 Old Swan
| Party | Candidate | Votes | % | ±% |
|---|---|---|---|---|
| Conservative | John Waterworth | 3,485 | 56% | |
| Labour | Herbert Edward Rose * | 1,893 | 31% | |
| Irish Nationalist | James Farrell jun. | 813 | 13% | |
| Majority | | 1,592 | | |
| Registered electors | | 11,263 | | |
| Turnout | | 6,191 | 55% | |
| Conservative gain from Labour | | Swing | | |

=== Prince's Park ===
No. 13 Prince's Park
| Party | Candidate | Votes | % | ±% |
|---|---|---|---|---|
| Conservative | David Jackson * | unopposed | | |
| Registered electors | | | | |
| Conservative hold | | Swing | | |

=== Sandhills ===
No. 1 Sandhills
| Party | Candidate | Votes | % | ±% |
|---|---|---|---|---|
| Irish Nationalist | Thomas Wafer Byrne * | unopposed | | |
| Registered electors | | | | |
| Irish Nationalist hold | | Swing | | |

=== St. Anne's ===
No. 6 St. Anne's
| Party | Candidate | Votes | % | ±% |
|---|---|---|---|---|
| Independent Labour | John Nield | 2,181 | 57% | |
| Liberal | Philip Durning Holt * | 1,642 | 43% | |
| Majority | | 539 | | |
| Registered electors | | 7,745 | | |
| Turnout | | 3,823 | 49% | |
| Independent Labour gain from Liberal | | Swing | | |

=== St. Domingo ===
No. 23 St. Domingo
| Party | Candidate | Votes | % | ±% |
|---|---|---|---|---|
| Conservative | Thomas White * | 3,917 | 84% | |
| Patriotic Labour | Charles Henry Allam | 721 | 16% | |
| Majority | | 3,196 | | |
| Registered electors | | 10,545 | | |
| Turnout | | 4,638 | 44% | |
| Conservative hold | | Swing | | |

=== St. Peter's ===
No. 8 St. Peter's
| Party | Candidate | Votes | % | ±% |
|---|---|---|---|---|
| Conservative | Henry Alexander Cole * | 732 | 65% | |
| Independent | Frederick Bowman | 402 | 35% | |
| Majority | | 330 | | |
| Registered electors | | 2,564 | | |
| Turnout | | 1,134 | 44% | |
| Conservative hold | | Swing | | |

=== Sefton Park East ===
No. 15 Sefton Park East
| Party | Candidate | Votes | % | ±% |
|---|---|---|---|---|
| Conservative | Arnold Rushton * | unopposed | | |
| Registered electors | | | | |
| Conservative hold | | Swing | | |

=== Sefton Park West ===
No. 16 Sefton Park West
| Party | Candidate | Votes | % | ±% |
|---|---|---|---|---|
| Liberal | Herbert Reynolds Rathbone * | unopposed | | |
| Registered electors | | | | |
| Liberal hold | | Swing | | |

=== South Scotland ===
The death of Councillor John O'Shea (Irish Nationalist, elected 1 November 1919) occurred on 28 October 1922, three days before his term of office was due to expire.

No. 3 South Scotland
| Party | Candidate | Votes | % | ±% |
|---|---|---|---|---|
| Irish Nationalist | Michael O'Mahony | 2,540 | 50.4% | |
| Labour | Henry Gaskin | 2,499 | 49.6% | |
| Majority | | 41 | | |
| Registered electors | | | | |
| Turnout | | | | |
| Irish Nationalist hold | | Swing | | |

=== Vauxhall ===
No. 4 Vauxhall
| Party | Candidate | Votes | % | ±% |
|---|---|---|---|---|
| Irish Nationalist | Thomas Arthur Murphy | 1,068 | 73% | |
| Labour | Michael James Mulvihill | 389 | 27% | |
| Majority | | 679 | | |
| Registered electors | | 3,572 | | |
| Turnout | | 1,457 | 41% | |
| Irish Nationalist hold | | Swing | | |

=== Walton ===
No. 25 Walton
| Party | Candidate | Votes | % | ±% |
|---|---|---|---|---|
| Conservative | Charles Roland Clare | unopposed | | |
| Registered electors | | | | |
| Conservative hold | | Swing | | |

=== Warbreck ===
No. 26 Warbreck
| Party | Candidate | Votes | % | ±% |
|---|---|---|---|---|
| Conservative | John Bartholomew Herman * | 2,856 | 79% | |
| Labour | Francis Fitzpatrick | 745 | 21% | |
| Majority | | 2,111 | | |
| Registered electors | | 10,902 | | |
| Turnout | | 3,601 | 33% | |
| Conservative hold | | Swing | | |

=== Wavertree ===
No. 34 Wavertree
| Party | Candidate | Votes | % | ±% |
|---|---|---|---|---|
| Conservative | Arthur Angers * | 2,228 | 43% | |
| Liberal | Charles Sydney Jones | 2,070 | 40% | |
| Labour | George Boothman | 885 | 17% | |
| Majority | | 158 | 3% | |
| Registered electors | | 9,707 | | |
| Turnout | | 5,183 | 53% | |
| Conservative hold | | Swing | | |

=== Wavertree West ===
No. 33 Wavertree West
| Party | Candidate | Votes | % | ±% |
|---|---|---|---|---|
| Conservative | James Granville Legge | 2,067 | 46% | |
| Labour | William Augustus Colcutt * | 1,170 | 26% | |
| Liberal | John Richard Hobhouse | 1,149 | 25% | |
| Irish Nationalist | Benjamin McGinnty | 134 | 3% | |
| Majority | | 897 | | |
| Registered electors | | 9,239 | | |
| Turnout | | 4,520 | 49% | |
| Conservative gain from Labour | | Swing | | |

=== West Derby ===
No. 28 West Derby
| Party | Candidate | Votes | % | ±% |
|---|---|---|---|---|
| Conservative | Robert Duncan French | 3,950 | 72% | |
| Labour | Walter Percy Helm * | 1,489 | 27% | |
| Irish Nationalist | John Patrick Farrelly | 77 | 1.4% | |
| Majority | | 2,461 | | |
| Registered electors | | 10,754 | | |
| Turnout | | 5,516 | 51% | |
| Conservative hold | | Swing | | |

== Aldermanic Elections ==
=== Aldermanic Election 7 February 1923 ===
Caused by the death of Alderman Richard Dart (Conservative, last elected as an alderman 9 November 1913) Councillor John Edwards (Conservative, Old Swan, elected 1 November 1921) was elected by the councillors as an alderman on 7 February 1923.

| Party | Alderman | Ward | Term expires |
|---|---|---|---|
| Conservative | John Edwards | No. 31 Fairfield | 1923 |

=== Aldermanic Election 7 March 1923 ===
Caused by the death of Alderman Louis Samuel Cohen (Conservative, last elected as an alderman 9 November 1913). In his place Councillor Thomas Dowd (Conservative Fairfield, elected 1 November 1921), Fruit Merchant of "Meadowside", Mount Road, Upton, Wirral was elected by the councillors as an alderman on 7 March 1923.

| Party | Alderman | Ward | Term expires |
|---|---|---|---|
| Conservative | Thomas Dowd | No. 26 Warbreck | 1923 |

== By-elections ==
=== No. 29 Anfield, 17 January 1923 ===
Caused by the resignation of Councillor William Owen Thomas (Liberal, Anfield, elected 1 November 1920) which was reported to the council on 3 January 1923

No. 29 Anfield 17 January 1923
| Party | Candidate | Votes | % | ±% |
|---|---|---|---|---|
| Liberal | Alfred Gates | 1,524 | | |
| | Arthur Venmore | 1,336 | | |
| Majority | | 188 | | |
| Registered electors | | 9,243 | | |
| Turnout | | | | |
| Liberal hold | | Swing | | |

=== No. 32 Old Swan, Tuesday 20 February 1923 ===
Following the death of Alderman Richard Dart (Conservative, last elected as an alderman 9 November 1913) Councillor John Edwards (Conservative, Old Swan, elected 1 November 1921) was elected by the councillors as an alderman on 7 February 1923 .

No. 32 Old Swan 20 February 1923
| Party | Candidate | Votes | % | ±% |
|---|---|---|---|---|
| Conservative | George Whittle | 2,060 | 55% | |
| Labour | Herbert Edward Rose | 1,661 | 45% | |
| Majority | | 399 | | |
| Registered electors | | 11,263 | | |
| Turnout | | 3,721 | | |
| Conservative hold | | Swing | | |

=== No. 31 Fairfield, 21 March 1923 ===
Caused by the election by the Council of Councillor Thomas Dowd (Conservative, Fairfield, elected 1 November 1921) as an alderman on 7 March 1922.

No. 31 Fairfield 21 March 1923
| Party | Candidate | Votes | % | ±% |
|---|---|---|---|---|
| Liberal | Charles Sydney Jones | Unopposed | N/A | N/A |
| Registered electors | | 9,061 | | |
| Liberal gain from Conservative | | | | |

=== No. 33 Wavertree West, Tuesday 15 May 1923 ===
Caused by the resignation of Councillor Sidney Stanley Dawson (Conservative, Wavertree West, elected 1 November 1921) was reported to the council on 2 May 1923.

No. 33 Wavertree West 15 May 1923
| Party | Candidate | Votes | % | ±% |
|---|---|---|---|---|
| Liberal | John Richard Hobhouse | 1,490 | 40% | |
| | Edward Percival Parker | 1,274 | 34% | |
| Labour | William Augustus Colcutt | 934 | 25% | |
| Majority | | 216 | | |
| Registered electors | | 9,239 | | |
| Turnout | | 3,698 | 40% | |
| Liberal gain from Conservative | | Swing | | |

=== No. 7 Castle Street, 21 June 1923 ===
Caused by the death of Councillor Benjamin Cookson (Party?, Castle Street, elected 1 November 1920) on 7 May 1923.

No. 7 Castle Street 21 June 1923
| Party | Candidate | Votes | % | ±% |
|---|---|---|---|---|
| Conservative | Frederick William Frodsham | unopposed | | |
| Registered electors | | | | |
| Conservative hold | | Swing | | |

=== No. 31 Fazakerley, ===
Caused by the death of Councillor Matthew Leitch (Conservative, Fazakerley, elected 1 November 1920) on 9 May 1923.

No. 27 Fazakerley
| Party | Candidate | Votes | % | ±% |
|---|---|---|---|---|
| Majority | | | | |
| Registered electors | | | | |
| Turnout | | | | |
| | gain from | Swing | | |

=== No. 22 Netherfield, Tuesday 31 July 1923 ===
Caused by the death of Councillor William Ball (Conservative, Netherfield, elected 1 November 1920) on 3 July 1923.

No. 22 Netherfield 31 July 1923
| Party | Candidate | Votes | % | ±% |
|---|---|---|---|---|
| Ind. Conservative | William Edward McLachlan | 2,437 | 68% | |
| | Charles Stamper | 717 | 20% | |
| Labour | George Chadwick | 406 | 11% | |
| Majority | | 1,720 | | |
| Registered electors | | 10,745 | | |
| Turnout | | 3,560 | 33% | |
| Ind. Conservative gain from | | | | |

== See also ==
- Liverpool City Council
- Liverpool Town Council elections 1835 - 1879
- Liverpool City Council elections 1880–present
- Mayors and Lord Mayors of Liverpool 1207 to present
- History of local government in England
