= 1908 Liverpool City Council election =

Liverpool City Council elections 1908

| ← 1907 | November 2, 1908 | 1909 → |

34 seats were up for election (one third): one seat for each of the 34 wards 69 (incl. Aldermen) seats needed for a majority

Elections to Liverpool City Council were held on Monday 2 November 1908.

After the election, the composition of the council was:

| Party | Councillors | ± | Aldermen | Total |
|---|---|---|---|---|
| Conservative | 62 | +6 | 24 | 86 |
| Liberal | 28 | -5 | 6 | 34 |
| Irish Nationalist | 11 | 0 | 3 | 14 |
| Labour | 1 | 0 | 0 | 1 |
| Protestant | ? | -1 | ? | ? |

== Election result ==
Liverpool local election result 1908
| Party | Seats | Gains | Losses | Net gain/loss | Seats % | Votes % | Votes | +/− |
|---|---|---|---|---|---|---|---|---|
| Conservative | 18 | 6 | 0 | +6 | 53% | 55% | 14,708 | |
| Liberal | 13 | 0 | 5 | -5 | 38% | 29% | 7,771 | |
| Irish Nationalist | 3 | 0 | 0 | 0 | 9% | 3.5% | 928 | |
| Labour | 1 | 0 | 0 | 0 | 3% | 0% | 0 | |
| Socialist | 0 | 0 | 1 | -1 | 0% | 4.5% | 1,203 | |
| Protestant | 0 | 0 | 1 | -1 | 0% | 3.7% | 972 | |
| Independent | 0 | 0 | 0 | 0 | 0% | 2.23% | 593 | |

Note that due to the large number of uncontested seats, these statistics should be taken in context.

== Ward results ==
* - Retiring councillor seeking re-election

Comparisons are made with the 1905 election results, as the retiring councillors were elected in that year.

=== Abercromby ===
No. 21 Abercromby
| Party | Candidate | Votes | % | ±% |
|---|---|---|---|---|
| Conservative | Dr. Henry Herbert Clarke | 873 | 56% | |
| Liberal | Arthur Black * | 677 | 44% | |
| Majority | | 196 | | |
| Registered electors | | 2,417 | | |
| Turnout | | 1,550 | 64% | |
| Conservative gain from Liberal | | Swing | | |

=== Aigburth ===
No. 36 Aigburth
| Party | Candidate | Votes | % | ±% |
|---|---|---|---|---|
| Conservative | Hartley Wilson * | unopposed | | |
| Registered electors | | | | |
| Conservative hold | | Swing | | |

=== Anfield ===
No. 3 Anfield
| Party | Candidate | Votes | % | ±% |
|---|---|---|---|---|
| Liberal | William Evans * | unopposed | | |
| Registered electors | | | | |
| Liberal hold | | Swing | | |

=== Breckfield ===
No. 6 Breckfield
| Party | Candidate | Votes | % | ±% |
|---|---|---|---|---|
| Conservative | Frank John Leslie * | unopposed | | |
| Registered electors | | | | |
| Conservative hold | | Swing | | |

=== Brunswick ===
No. 25 Brunswick
| Party | Candidate | Votes | % | ±% |
|---|---|---|---|---|
| Liberal | Thomas Roberts * | unopposed | | |
| Registered electors | | | | |
| Liberal hold | | Swing | | |

=== Castle Street ===
No. 15 Castle Street
| Party | Candidate | Votes | % | ±% |
|---|---|---|---|---|
| Liberal | Richard George Hough | unopposed | | |
| Registered electors | | | | |
| Liberal hold | | Swing | | |

=== Dingle ===
No. 12 Dingle
| Party | Candidate | Votes | % | ±% |
|---|---|---|---|---|
| Conservative | Dr. Richard Caton * | unopposed | | |
| Registered electors | | | | |
| Conservative hold | | Swing | | |

=== Edge Hill ===
No. 12 Edge Hill
| Party | Candidate | Votes | % | ±% |
|---|---|---|---|---|
| Conservative | William Wilson Walker | 1,605 | 70% | |
| Liberal | Clement Freeman * | 701 | 30% | |
| Majority | | 904 | | |
| Registered electors | | 4,643 | | |
| Turnout | | 2,306 | 50% | |
| Conservative gain from Liberal | | Swing | | |

=== Everton ===
No. 9 Everton
| Party | Candidate | Votes | % | ±% |
|---|---|---|---|---|
| Liberal | William Denton * | unopposed | | |
| Registered electors | | | | |
| Liberal hold | | Swing | | |

=== Exchange ===
No. 13 Exchange
| Party | Candidate | Votes | % | ±% |
|---|---|---|---|---|
| Liberal | Joseph Bibby * | unopposed | | |
| Registered electors | | | | |
| Liberal hold | | Swing | | |

=== Fairfield ===
No. 25 Fairfield
| Party | Candidate | Votes | % | ±% |
|---|---|---|---|---|
| Conservative | Thomas Dowd | 1,477 | 56% | |
| Liberal | A. Gates | 1,156 | 44% | |
| Majority | | 321 | | |
| Registered electors | | 3,818 | | |
| Turnout | | 2,633 | 69% | |
| Conservative hold | | Swing | | |

=== Fazakerley ===
No. 31 Fazakerley
| Party | Candidate | Votes | % | ±% |
|---|---|---|---|---|
| Conservative | Henry Sharrock Higginbottom * | unopposed | | |
| Registered electors | | | | |
| Conservative hold | | Swing | | |

=== Garston ===
No. 30 Garston
| Party | Candidate | Votes | % | ±% |
|---|---|---|---|---|
| Liberal | James Picthall * | unopposed | | |
| Registered electors | | | | |
| Liberal hold | | Swing | | |

=== Granby ===
No. 22 Granby
| Party | Candidate | Votes | % | ±% |
|---|---|---|---|---|
| Liberal | John Lea * | unopposed | | |
| Registered electors | | | | |
| Liberal hold | | Swing | | |

=== Great George ===
No. 20 Great George
| Party | Candidate | Votes | % | ±% |
|---|---|---|---|---|
| Liberal | John Lamport Ellis * | unopposed | | |
| Registered electors | | | | |
| Liberal hold | | Swing | | |

=== Kensington ===
No. 11 Kensington
| Party | Candidate | Votes | % | ±% |
|---|---|---|---|---|
| Conservative | John Gordon | 1,641 | 58% | |
| Socialist | John Wolfe Tone Morrissey * | 1,203 | 42% | |
| Majority | | 438 | | |
| Registered electors | | 4,639 | | |
| Turnout | | 2,844 | 61% | |
| Conservative gain from Socialist | | Swing | | |

=== Kirkdale ===
No. 2 Kirkdale
| Party | Candidate | Votes | % | ±% |
|---|---|---|---|---|
| Conservative | Dr. John Utting * | unopposed | | |
| Registered electors | | | | |
| Conservative hold | | Swing | | |

=== Low Hill ===
No. 10 Low Hill
| Party | Candidate | Votes | % | ±% |
|---|---|---|---|---|
| Conservative | David Pearson * | unopposed | | |
| Registered electors | | | | |
| Conservative hold | | Swing | | |

=== Netherfield ===
No. 8 Netherfield
| Party | Candidate | Votes | % | ±% |
|---|---|---|---|---|
| Conservative | William Waugh * | 996 | 57% | |
| Protestant | John Walker | 740 | 43% | |
| Majority | | 256 | | |
| Registered electors | | 4,007 | | |
| Turnout | | 1,736 | 43% | |
| Conservative hold | | Swing | | |

=== North Scotland ===
No. 13 North Scotland
| Party | Candidate | Votes | % | ±% |
|---|---|---|---|---|
| Irish Nationalist | James Bolger | unopposed | | |
| Registered electors | | | | |
| Irish Nationalist hold | | Swing | | |

=== Old Swan ===
No. 28A Old Swan
| Party | Candidate | Votes | % | ±% |
|---|---|---|---|---|
| Conservative | John Edwards | 1,265 | 75% | |
| Socialist | Alan John Tracy | 431 | 25% | |
| Majority | | 834 | | |
| Registered electors | | 3,173 | | |
| Turnout | | 1,696 | 53% | |
| Conservative gain from Irish Nationalist | | Swing | | |

=== Prince's Park ===
No. 23 Prince's Park
| Party | Candidate | Votes | % | ±% |
|---|---|---|---|---|
| Liberal | Acheson Lyle Rupert Rathbone * | unopposed | | |
| Registered electors | | | | |
| Liberal hold | | Swing | | |

=== Sandhills ===
No. 1 Sandhills
| Party | Candidate | Votes | % | ±% |
|---|---|---|---|---|
| Irish Nationalist | Patrick Joseph Deery * | 928 | 61% | |
| Ind. Conservative | John Carr | 459 | 30% | |
| Independent | James Maher | 134 | 9% | |
| Majority | | 469 | | |
| Registered electors | | 3,303 | | |
| Turnout | | 1,521 | 46% | |
| Irish Nationalist hold | | Swing | | |

=== St. Anne's ===
No. 6 St. Anne's
| Party | Candidate | Votes | % | ±% |
|---|---|---|---|---|
| Labour | James Sexton * | unopposed | | |
| Registered electors | | | | |
| Labour hold | | Swing | | |

=== St. Domingo ===
No. 23 St. Domingo
| Party | Candidate | Votes | % | ±% |
|---|---|---|---|---|
| Conservative | George William Whittaker * | 1,345 | 85% | |
| Protestant | Isaac Adams | 232 | 15% | |
| Majority | | 1,113 | | |
| Registered electors | | 4,447 | | |
| Turnout | | 1,577 | 35% | |
| Conservative hold | | Swing | | |

=== St. Peter's ===
No. 19 St. Peter's
| Party | Candidate | Votes | % | ±% |
|---|---|---|---|---|
| Liberal | Burton William Ellis * | 617 | 54% | |
| Conservative | Henry Lyons | 516 | 46% | |
| Majority | | 101 | | |
| Registered electors | | 1,744 | | |
| Turnout | | 1,133 | 65% | |
| Liberal hold | | Swing | | |

=== Sefton Park East ===
No. 24A Sefton Park East
| Party | Candidate | Votes | % | ±% |
|---|---|---|---|---|
| Conservative | Reginald George Layton | 1,318 | 53% | |
| Liberal | Wilfrid Bowring Stoddart | 1,156 | 47% | |
| Majority | | 162 | | |
| Registered electors | | 3,534 | | |
| Turnout | | 2,474 | 70% | |
| Conservative gain from Liberal | | Swing | | |

=== Sefton Park West ===
No. 24 Sefton Park West
| Party | Candidate | Votes | % | ±% |
|---|---|---|---|---|
| Conservative | F. Pritchard | unopposed | | |
| Registered electors | | | | |
| Conservative hold | | Swing | | |

=== South Scotland ===
No. 14 South Scotland
| Party | Candidate | Votes | % | ±% |
|---|---|---|---|---|
| Irish Nationalist | Austin Harford * | unopposed | | |
| Registered electors | | | | |
| Irish Nationalist hold | | Swing | | |

=== Vauxhall ===
No. 4 Vauxhall
| Party | Candidate | Votes | % | ±% |
|---|---|---|---|---|
| Liberal | Max Muspratt | 651 | 55% | |
| Conservative | George Marks Davey | 530 | 45% | |
| Majority | | 121 | | |
| Registered electors | | 1,779 | | |
| Turnout | | 1,181 | 66% | |
| Liberal hold | | Swing | | |

=== Walton ===
No. 3A Walton
| Party | Candidate | Votes | % | ±% |
|---|---|---|---|---|
| Conservative | J. McDermott | unopposed | | |
| Registered electors | | | | |
| Conservative hold | | Swing | | |

=== Warbreck ===
No. 26 Warbreck
| Party | Candidate | Votes | % | ±% |
|---|---|---|---|---|
| Liberal | Edward West * | unopposed | | |
| Registered electors | | | | |
| Liberal hold | | Swing | | |

=== Wavertree ===
No. 34 Wavertree
| Party | Candidate | Votes | % | ±% |
|---|---|---|---|---|
| Liberal | Charles Clarke Morrison * | 960 | 53% | |
| Conservative | George Brodrick Smith-Brodrick | 864 | 47% | |
| Majority | | 96 | | |
| Registered electors | | 2,938 | | |
| Turnout | | 1,824 | 62% | |
| Liberal hold | | Swing | | |

=== Wavertree West ===
No. 5A Wavertree West
| Party | Candidate | Votes | % | ±% |
|---|---|---|---|---|
| Conservative | Edmund Gerson Jackson | 1,175 | 55% | |
| Liberal | William Berrington Jones * | 971 | 45% | |
| Majority | | 204 | | |
| Registered electors | | 3,475 | | |
| Turnout | | 2,146 | 62% | |
| Conservative gain from Liberal | | Swing | | |

=== West Derby ===
No. 28 West Derby
| Party | Candidate | Votes | % | ±% |
|---|---|---|---|---|
| Conservative | William James Bailes | 1,103 | 56% | |
| Liberal | Samuel Skelton * | 882 | 44% | |
| Majority | | 221 | | |
| Registered electors | | 3,029 | | |
| Turnout | | 1,985 | 66% | |
| Conservative gain from Liberal | | Swing | | |

== Aldermanic elections ==
=== Aldermanic election, 9 November 1908 ===
Following the death of Alderman William Hall Jowett (Conservative, elected as an alderman on 9 November 1907), Councillor James Lister (Conservative, Old Swan, elected 1 November 1907) was elected as an alderman on 9 November 1908.

| Party | Alderman | Ward | Term expires |
|---|---|---|---|
| Conservative | James Lister | | 1913 |

=== Aldermanic election, 27 October 1909 ===
The resignation of Alderman William James Burgess (Conservative, elected as an alderman 9 November 1904) was reported to the Council on 6 October 1909.

In his place, Councillor Arthur Crosthwaite (Conservative, Wavertree, elected 1 November 1906) was elected as an alderman by the Council on 27 October 1909.

| Party | Alderman | Ward | Term expires |
|---|---|---|---|
| Conservative | Arthur Crosthwaite | No.3 Anfield | 1910 |

== By-elections ==
=== No. 8 Netherfield, 26 November 1908 ===
Caused by the resignation of Councillor George Sturla (Conservative, Netherfield, elected 1 November 1907) which was reported to the Council on 9 November 1908

No. 8 Netherfield
| Party | Candidate | Votes | % | ±% |
|---|---|---|---|---|
| | John Alfred Irving | 1,008 | 58% | |
| Protestant | John Walker | 721 | 42% | |
| Majority | | 287 | | |
| Registered electors | | 4,007 | | |
| Turnout | | 1,729 | 43% | |
| gain from | | Swing | | |

=== No. 28A Old Swan, 26 November 1908 ===
Caused by the election of Councillor James Lister (Conservative, Old Swan, elected 1 November 1907) was elected as an alderman on 9 November 1908.

No. 28A Old Swan
| Party | Candidate | Votes | % | ±% |
|---|---|---|---|---|
| Conservative | Charles Burchall | unopposed | | |
| Registered electors | | 3,173 | | |
| Conservative hold | | Swing | | |

=== No.16 Exchange ward, 29 January 1909 ===
Caused by the death of Robert Durning Holt (Liberal, Exchange, elected 1 November 1907) on 10 December 1908.

No. 13 Exchange
| Party | Candidate | Votes | % | ±% |
|---|---|---|---|---|
| Liberal | Frederick Charles Bowring | unopposed | | |
| Registered electors | | | | |
| Liberal hold | | Swing | | |

=== No.19 St. Peter's, 15 June 1909 ===
The resignation of Councillor Horace Muspratt (Party?, St. Peter's, elected 15 April 1908) was reported to the Council on 2 June 1909.

No. 19 St. Peter's
| Party | Candidate | Votes | % | ±% |
|---|---|---|---|---|
| Liberal | John Byrne | unopposed | | |
| Registered electors | | | | |
| Liberal hold | | Swing | | |

=== No. 22 Granby, 7 October 1909 ===
Caused by the death of Councillor Robert Henry Bullen (Liberal, Granby, elected 1 November 1907).

No. 22 Granby
| Party | Candidate | Votes | % | ±% |
|---|---|---|---|---|
| Independent | Eleanor Florence Rathbone | 1,066 | 67% | |
| | Francis James Welland | 516 | 33% | |
| Majority | | 550 | | |
| Registered electors | | | | |
| Turnout | | 1,582 | | |
| Independent gain from Liberal | | Swing | | |

This by-election was notable in that Eleanor Rathbone was the first woman elected to Liverpool City Council.

== See also ==
- Liverpool City Council
- Liverpool Town Council elections 1835–1879
- Liverpool City Council elections 1880–present
- Mayors and Lord Mayors of Liverpool 1207–present
- History of local government in England
