= 1907 Liverpool City Council election =

Liverpool City Council elections 1907

← 1906	November 1, 1907	1908 →

34 seats were up for election (one third): one seat for each of the 34 wards 69 (incl. Aldermen) seats needed for a majority

Elections to Liverpool City Council were held on 1 November 1907.

This was the first Liverpool City Council election in which women stood as candidates : Miss Harriet Mary Johnson stood as an independent in the Dingle ward and Miss Ellen Robinson stood as a Liberal in the West Derby ward.

Nine of the thirty-four seats were uncontested.

After the election, the composition of the council was:

Party	Councillors	±	Aldermen	Total
Conservative	54	+7	26	80
Liberal	35	-6	6	41
Irish Nationalist	11	0	2	13
Labour	2	0	0	2
Protestant	1	-1	0	1

== Election result ==
Liverpool local election result 1907
Party	Seats	Gains	Losses	Net gain/loss	Seats %	Votes %	Votes	+/−
Conservative	22	8	1	+7	65%	57%	27,877	
Liberal	8	1	7	-6	24%	26%	12,880	
Irish Nationalist	3	0	0	0	9%	0%	0	
Protestant	1	0	1	-1	3%	6.7%	3,294	
Independent	0	0	0	0	0%	3.4%	1,685	
Labour	0	0	0	0	0%	3.1%	1,533	
Socialist	0	0	0	0	0%	2.3%	1,141	
Ind. Labour Party	0	0	0	0	0%	1.6%	767	

The significant number of uncontested seats means that these statistics should be taken in context.

== Ward results ==
* - Retiring Councillor seeking re-election

Comparisons are made with the 1905 election results, as the retiring councillors were elected in that year.

=== Abercromby ===
No. 21 Abercromby
Party	Candidate	Votes	%	±%
Conservative	Thomas James Smith jnr	973	59%	
Liberal	Dr. William Permewan *	676	41%	
Majority		297		
Registered electors		2,513		
Turnout		1,649	66%	
Conservative gain from Liberal		Swing		

=== Aigburth ===
No. 29 Aigburth
Party	Candidate	Votes	%	±%
Conservative	William Parkfield Wethered	696	64%	
Liberal	Archibald Bathgate *	389	36%	
Majority		307		
Registered electors		1,450		
Turnout		1,085	75%	
Conservative gain from Liberal		Swing		

=== Anfield ===
No. 3 Anfield
Party	Candidate	Votes	%	±%
Conservative	Edward Russell Taylor *	930	83%	
Independent	William Robert Roberts	190	17%	
Majority		740		
Registered electors		2,830		
Turnout		1,120	40%	
Conservative hold		Swing		

=== Breckfield ===
No. 6 Breckfield
Party	Candidate	Votes	%	±%
Conservative	Louis Samuel Cohen	1,421	62%	
Liberal	John Meek	881	38%	
Majority		540		
Registered electors		4,133		
Turnout		2,320	56%	
Conservative hold		Swing		

=== Brunswick ===
No. 25 Brunswick
Party	Candidate	Votes	%	±%
Liberal	Patrick Charles Kelly *	unopposed		
Registered electors				
Liberal hold		Swing		

=== Castle Street ===
No. 18 Castle Street
Party	Candidate	Votes	%	±%
Conservative	Charles Frederick Garner *	774	59%	
Liberal	Frederick Charles Bowring	533	41%	
Majority		241		
Registered electors		2,099		
Turnout		1,307	62%	
Conservative hold		Swing		

=== Dingle ===
No. 26 Dingle
Party	Candidate	Votes	%	±%
Conservative	Edward James Chevalier *	1,487	66%	
Independent	Miss Harriet Mary Johnson	765	34%	
Majority		722		
Registered electors		5,268		
Turnout		2,252	43%	
Conservative hold		Swing		

=== Edge Hill ===
No. 12 Edge Hill
Party	Candidate	Votes	%	±%
Conservative	Joseph Henry Harrison	1,461	62%	
Independent	Thomas Byrne	589	25%	
Socialist	Charles Wilson	314	13%	
Majority		872		
Registered electors		4,791		
Turnout		2,364	49%	
Conservative hold		Swing		

=== Everton ===
No. 9 Everton
Party	Candidate	Votes	%	±%
Conservative	Gerald Kyffin-Taylor *	1,392	65%	
Liberal	Charles Phillips	764	35%	
Majority		628		
Registered electors		4,437		
Turnout		2,156	49%	
Conservative hold		Swing		

=== Exchange ===
No. 16 Exchange
Party	Candidate	Votes	%	±%
Liberal	Robert Durning Holt *	unopposed		
Registered electors				
Liberal hold		Swing		

=== Fairfield ===
No. 25 Fairfield
Party	Candidate	Votes	%	±%
Liberal	James Hughes *	1,141	50%	
Conservative	Harry Shakespeare Badger	1,124	50%	
Majority		17		
Registered electors		3,845		
Turnout		2,265	59%	
Liberal hold		Swing		

=== Garston ===
No. 37 Garston
Party	Candidate	Votes	%	±%
Conservative	Frederick James Rawlinson *	unopposed		
Registered electors				
Conservative hold		Swing		

=== Granby ===
No. 24 Granby
Party	Candidate	Votes	%	±%
Liberal	Robert Henry Bullen *	941	40%	
Conservative	Herbert John Davis	928	40%	
Socialist	Francis James Welland	643	20%	
Majority		13		
Registered electors		3,683		
Turnout		2,332	63%	
Liberal hold		Swing		

=== Great George ===
No. 20 Great George
Party	Candidate	Votes	%	±%
Conservative	Dr. Albert Edward Davis	641	52%	
Liberal	Burton William Eills *	601	48%	
Majority		40		
Registered electors		1,761		
Turnout		1,242	71%	
Conservative gain from Liberal		Swing		

=== Kensington ===
No. 11 Kensington
Party	Candidate	Votes	%	±%
Conservative	Samuel Mason Hutchinson *	1,677	69%	
Ind. Labour Party	Nelson Taylor	767	31%	
Majority		910		
Registered electors		4,754		
Turnout		2,444	51%	
Conservative hold		Swing		

=== Kirkdale ===
No. 2 Kirkdale
Party	Candidate	Votes	%	±%
Protestant	John George Paris *	unopposed		
Registered electors				
Protestant hold		Swing		

=== Low Hill ===
No. 10 Low Hill
Party	Candidate	Votes	%	±%
Conservative	William Boote *	1,265	65%	
Labour	David Little	686	35%	
Majority		579		
Registered electors				
Turnout		1,951	50%	
Conservative hold		Swing		

=== Netherfield ===
No. 8 Netherfield
Party	Candidate	Votes	%	±%
Conservative	George Sturla *	1,400	65%	
Protestant	John Walker	764	35%	
Majority		636		
Registered electors		4,093		
Turnout		2,164	53%	
Conservative gain from Liberal		Swing		

=== North Scotland ===
No. 13 North Scotland
Party	Candidate	Votes	%	±%
Irish Nationalist	George Jeremy Lynskey *	unopposed		
Registered electors				
Irish Nationalist hold		Swing		

=== Old Swan ===
No. 28A Old Swan
Party	Candidate	Votes	%	±%
Conservative	James Lister *	1,042	74%	
Socialist	Alan John Tracy	364	26%	
Majority		678		
Registered electors		2,984		
Turnout		1,406	47%	
Conservative hold		Swing		

=== Prince's Park ===
No. 23 Prince's Park
Party	Candidate	Votes	%	±%
Conservative	Frederick William Frodsham	1,331	59%	
Liberal	Max Muspratt *	927	41%	
Majority		404		
Registered electors		3,600		
Turnout		2,258	63%	
Conservative gain from Liberal		Swing		

=== Sandhills ===
No. 1 Sandhills
Party	Candidate	Votes	%	±%
Liberal	James Arthur Appleton *	938	50%	
Conservative	John Lucas Rankin	932	50%	
Majority		6		
Registered electors		3,383		
Turnout		1,870	55%	
Liberal hold		Swing		

=== St. Anne's ===
No. 17 St. Anne's
Party	Candidate	Votes	%	±%
Liberal	Dr. James Clement Baxter	994	58%	
Conservative	David Pearson	729	42%	
Majority		265		
Registered electors		2,806		
Turnout		1,723	61%	
Liberal gain from Conservative		Swing		

=== St. Domingo ===
No. 7 St. Domingo
Party	Candidate	Votes	%	±%
Conservative	Dr. Charles Alexander Hill	1,214	56%	
Protestant	Henry Porter *	946	44%	
Majority		268		
Registered electors		4,522		
Turnout		2,160	48%	
Conservative gain from Protestant		Swing		

=== St. Peter's ===
No. 19 St. Peter's
Party	Candidate	Votes	%	±%
Liberal	Henry Miles *	unopposed		
Registered electors				
Liberal hold		Swing		

=== Sefton Park East ===
No. 24A Sefton Park East
Party	Candidate	Votes	%	±%
Liberal	John Morris *	1,122	50%	
Conservative	Reginald George Layton	1,100	50%	
Majority		22		
Registered electors		3,643		
Turnout		2,222	67%	
Liberal hold		Swing		

=== Sefton Park West ===
No. 24 Sefton Park West
Party	Candidate	Votes	%	±%
Conservative	Fred Pritchard	949	60%	
Liberal	Joseph Wilson	630	40%	
Majority		319		
Registered electors		2,467		
Turnout		1,579	64%	
Conservative gain from Liberal		Swing		

=== South Scotland ===
No. 14 South Scotland
Party	Candidate	Votes	%	±%
Irish Nationalist	Francis Joseph Harford *	unopposed		
Registered electors				
Irish Nationalist hold		Swing		

=== Vauxhall ===
No. 15 Vauxhall
Party	Candidate	Votes	%	±%
Irish Nationalist	John Gregory Taggart *	unopposed		
Registered electors				
Irish Nationalist hold		Swing		

=== Walton ===
No. 3A Walton
Party	Candidate	Votes	%	±%
Conservative	Dr. John George Moyles *	unopposed		
Registered electors				
Conservative hold		Swing		

=== Warbreck ===
No. 27 Warbreck
Party	Candidate	Votes	%	±%
Conservative	Richard Kelly *	1,157	89%	
Independent	John Sidney Smith	141	11%	
Majority		1,016		
Registered electors		3,190		
Turnout		1,298	41%	
Conservative hold		Swing		

=== Wavertree ===
No. 5 Wavertree
Party	Candidate	Votes	%	±%
Conservative	Colonel Robert Stephen Porter *	884	54%	
Liberal	John Kellitt	752	46%	
Majority		132		
Registered electors		2,629		
Turnout		1,636	62%	
Conservative hold		Swing		

=== Wavertree West ===
No. 5A Wavertree West
Party	Candidate	Votes	%	±%
Conservative	Josiah Mason Hargreaves	1,188	55%	
Liberal	Cecil Haywood Brunner *	971	45%	
Majority		217		
Registered electors		3,552		
Turnout		2,159	61%	
Conservative gain from Liberal		Swing		

=== West Derby ===
No. 28 West Derby
Party	Candidate	Votes	%	±%
Conservative	Robert Edward Walkington Stephenson *	1,182	66%	
Liberal	Miss Ellen Robinson	620	34%	
Majority		562		
Registered electors		2,917		
Turnout		1,802	62%	
Conservative hold		Swing		

== Aldermanic Election, 9 November 1907 ==
At the meeting of the Council on 9 November 1907, the terms of office of fifteen alderman expired.

The following seventeen were elected as Aldermen by the Council (Aldermen and Councillors) on 9 November 1907 for a term of six years.

* - re-elected aldermen.

Party	Alderman
Conservative	Edward Hatton Cookson JP *
Conservative	John Duncan JP *
Conservative	Sir William Bower Forwood JP *
Conservative	Edward Grindley JP *
Conservative	Sir Robert Alfred Hampson JP *
Conservative	William Hall Jowett JP *
Conservative	Simon Jude *
Conservative	Richard Kelly JP
Conservative	Edward Lewis Lloyd JP
Conservative	Maxwell Hyslop Maxwell JP *
Conservative	Thomas William Oakshott JP *
Conservative	William Oulton JP *
Conservative	William Radcliffe JP *
Conservative	William Roberts *
Conservative	Sir Thomas Bland Royden, Bart. *
Conservative	William Watson Rutherford MP JP
Conservative	Joachim Nicolas Stolterfoht *

=== Aldermanic Election, 2 September 1908 ===
Caused by the resignation of alderman Sir Robert Alfred Hampson (Conservative, elected as an alderman on 9 November 1907) was reported to the Council on 1 July 1908.

In his place Councillor John Gregory Taggart (Irish Nationalist, Vauxhall, elected 1 November 1907) was elected as an alderman by the Council on 2 September 1908

Party	Alderman	Ward	Term expires
Irish Nationalist	John Gregory Taggart	No.20 Great George	1910

=== Aldermanic Election, 21 October 1908 ===
Following the death of Alderman Edward Paull (Liberal, elected as an alderman by the Council on 9 November 1904) on 25 September 1908, his place was taken by Councillor Richard Robert Meade-King (Liberal, Vauxhall, elected 1 November 1905) when he was elected as an alderman by the Council on 21 October 1908.

Party	Alderman	Ward	Term expires
Liberal	Richard Robert Meade-King	No.1 Sandhills	1910

== By-Elections ==
=== No.8 Netherfield, 26 November 1907 ===
Caused by the election as an alderman of Councillor William Watson Rutherford MP (Conservative, Netherfield, elected 1 November 1905) on 9 November 1907

No. 8 Netherfield
Party	Candidate	Votes	%	±%
Conservative	William Waugh			
Majority				
Registered electors				
Turnout				
Conservative hold		Swing		

=== No.9 Everton, 26 November 1907 ===
Caused by the election as an alderman of Councillor Edward Lewis Lloyd JP (Conservative, Everton, elected unopposed 1 November 1906) on 9 November 1907.

No. 9 Everton
Party	Candidate	Votes	%	±%
	Richard Rutherford	unopposed		
Registered electors		4,437		
	gain from	Swing		

=== No.27 Warbreck, 26 November 1907 ===
Caused by the election as an alderman of Councillor Richard Kelly JP (Conservative, Warbreck, elected 1 November 1907) on 9 November 1907.

No. 27 Warbreck
Party	Candidate	Votes	%	±%
Conservative	Sydney Edward Davies	1,103	67%	
	William Holgate	553	33%	
Majority		550		
Registered electors				
Turnout		1,656		
Conservative hold		Swing		

=== No.19 St. Peter's, 19 December 1907 ===
Caused by the resignation of Councillor Alexander Armour (Liberal, St. Peter's, elected 1 November 1905) on 6 November 1907, which was reported to the Council on 4 December 1907.

No. 19 St. Peter's
Party	Candidate	Votes	%	±%
Liberal	Burton William Eills	unopposed		
Registered electors				
Liberal hold		Swing		

=== No.19 St. Peter's, 15 April 1908 ===
Caused by the death of Councillor Henry Miles (Liberal, St. Peter's, elected 1 November 1907) on 21 March 1908.

No. 19 St. Peter's
Party	Candidate	Votes	%	±%
	Horace Muspratt	unopposed		
Registered electors				
	gain from	Swing		

=== No.10 Low Hill, 15 April 1907 ===
Caused by the resignation of Councillor John McEvoy (Liberal, Low Hill, elected 1 November 1905) which was reported to the Council on 1 April 1907,

No. 10 Low Hill
Party	Candidate	Votes	%	±%
Conservative	David Pearson	1,013	60%	
	William Nash	689	40%	
Majority		324		
Registered electors		3,874		
Turnout		1,702	44%	
Conservative gain from Liberal		Swing		

=== No.15 Vauxhall, 16 September 1908 ===
Caused by Councillor John Gregory Taggart (Irish Nationalist, Vauxhall, elected 1 November 1907) being elected as an alderman by the Council on 2 September 1908 .

No. 15 Vauxhall
Party	Candidate	Votes	%	±%
Irish Nationalist	Joseph Hughes	574	58%	
	George Marks Davey	413	42%	
Majority		161		
Registered electors				
Turnout		987		
Irish Nationalist hold		Swing		

== See also ==
- Liverpool City Council
- Liverpool Town Council elections 1835 - 1879
- Liverpool City Council elections 1880–present
- Mayors and Lord Mayors of Liverpool 1207 to present
- History of local government in England
