= 1901 Liverpool City Council election =

English local election

- 1 November 1901
	Conservative	Liberal	Irish Nationalist
Party	Conservative	Liberal	Irish Nationalist
Popular vote	18,212	6,547	4,501
Percentage	55%	20%	14%
	Liberal Unionist
Party	Liberal Unionist
Popular vote	2,584
Percentage	7.8%
Council Leader before election
Conservative
Council Leader after election
Conservative

Elections for one third of the Councillors' seats for Liverpool City Council were held on Friday 1 November 1901.

There were elections for each of the 32 wards, with the second councillors being elected for the Anfield and Warbreck wards for the first time.

Eight of the thirty two seats were uncontested.

After the election, the composition of the council was:

Party	Councillors	±	Aldermen	Total
Conservative	??	+1	21	??
Liberal	??	+1	6	??
Irish Nationalist	??	0	2	??
Liberal Unionist	??	+1	1	??
Independent	??	0	0	??

== Election result ==
Liverpool local election result 1901
Party	Seats	Gains	Losses	Net gain/loss	Seats %	Votes %	Votes	+/−
Conservative	17	4	3	+1	57%	55%	18,212	
Liberal	8	2	1	+1	27%	20%	6,547	
Irish Nationalist	3	0	0	0	10%	14%	4,501	
Liberal Unionist	2	1	0	+1	7%	7.8%	2,584	
Lib-Lab	0					1.7%	557	
Labour Repr. Cmte.	0					1.6%	520	
Independent	0					1%	321	

== Ward results ==
* - Retiring Councillor seeking re-election

Comparisons are made with the 1898 election results, as the retiring councillors were elected in that year.

=== Abercromby ===
No. 21 Abercromby
Party	Candidate	Votes	%	±%
Conservative	William Phillips	553	87%	
Independent	Edward Phillips	85	13%	
Majority		468		
Registered electors		2,887		
Turnout		638	22%	
Conservative hold		Swing		

=== Anfield ===
No. 3 Anfield
Party	Candidate	Votes	%	±%
Conservative	William Houlding	unopposed		
Registered electors				
Conservative win (new seat)				

=== Breckfield ===
No. 6 Breckfield
Party	Candidate	Votes	%	±%
Conservative	Edwin Berry *	unopposed		
Registered electors				
Conservative hold		Swing		

=== Brunswick ===
No. 25 Brunswick
Party	Candidate	Votes	%	±%
Liberal	Charles Henry Beloe *	992	71%	
Conservative	Joseph Titley	374	29%	
Majority		548		
Registered electors		3,073		
Turnout		1,296	42%	
Liberal hold		Swing		

=== Castle Street ===
No. 18 Castle Street
Party	Candidate	Votes	%	±%
Conservative	Thomas Binley Neale *	575	71%	
Independent	Edward Hood	236	29%	
Majority		339		
Registered electors		2,126		
Turnout		811	38%	
Conservative hold		Swing		

=== Dingle ===
No. 26 Dingle
Party	Candidate	Votes	%	±%
Conservative	Edward James Chevalier *	1,608	58%	
Irish Nationalist	Patrick J. Higgins	145	10%	
Majority		1,191		
Registered electors		5,304		
Turnout		1,481	28%	
Conservative hold		Swing		

=== Edge Hill ===
No. 12 Edge Hill
Party	Candidate	Votes	%	±%
Conservative	William Wilson Walker *	1,336	89%	
Irish Nationalist	John McGrath	160	11%	
Majority		1,176		
Registered electors		5,125		
Turnout		1,496	29%	
Conservative hold		Swing		

=== Everton ===
No. 9 Everton
Party	Candidate	Votes	%	±%
Liberal Unionist	William Oulton *	1,010	89%	
Irish Nationalist	John Hughes	125	11%	
Majority		885		
Registered electors		4,701		
Turnout		1,135	24%	
Liberal Unionist hold		Swing		

=== Exchange ===
No. 16 Exchange
Party	Candidate	Votes	%	±%
Liberal	Robert Durning Holt *	unopposed		
Registered electors				
Liberal hold		Swing		

=== Fairfield ===
No. 4 Fairfield
Party	Candidate	Votes	%	±%
Conservative	Joseph Hunter *	1,203	61%	
Liberal	Samuel Skelton	776	39%	
Majority		427		
Registered electors		3,959		
Turnout		1,979	50%	
Conservative hold		Swing		

=== Granby ===
No. 22 Granby
Party	Candidate	Votes	%	±%
Liberal	Robert Henry Bullen *	unopposed		
Registered electors				
Liberal hold		Swing		

=== Great George ===
No. 20 Great George
Party	Candidate	Votes	%	±%
Liberal	Burton William Eills	unopposed		
Registered electors				
Liberal hold		Swing		

=== Kensington ===
No. 11 Kensington
Party	Candidate	Votes	%	±%
Liberal Unionist	Samuel Mason Hutchinson	1,180	90%	
Irish Nationalist	Hugh O'Donnell	134	10%	
Majority		1,046		
Registered electors		4,590		
Turnout		1,314	29%	
Liberal Unionist gain from Conservative		Swing		

=== Kirkdale ===
No. 2 Kirkdale
Party	Candidate	Votes	%	±%
Conservative	John Edward Rayner	1,592	84%	
Irish Nationalist	Patrick Cullen	297	16%	
Majority		1,295		
Registered electors		6,479		
Turnout		1,889	29%	
Conservative hold		Swing		

=== Low Hill ===
No. 10 Low Hill
Party	Candidate	Votes	%	±%
Conservative	William Boote	1,031	66%	
Labour	Isaac Newton	520	34%	
Majority		511		
Registered electors		4,141		
Turnout		1,551	37%	
Conservative hold		Swing		

=== Netherfield ===
No. 8 Netherfield
Party	Candidate	Votes	%	±%
Liberal	George Sturla	1,307	53%	
Conservative	David Scott	1,163	47%	
Majority		144		
Registered electors		4,418		
Turnout		2,470	56%	
Liberal gain from Conservative		Swing		

=== North Scotland ===
No. 13 North Scotland
Party	Candidate	Votes	%	±%
Irish Nationalist	George Jeremy Lynskey	1,355	75%	
Conservative	David John Williams	452	25%	
Majority		903		
Registered electors		3,239		
Turnout		1,807	56%	
Irish Nationalist hold		Swing		

=== Prince's Park ===
No. 23 Prince's Park
Party	Candidate	Votes	%	±%
Conservative	William Edward Willink *	778	90%	
Irish Nationalist	William Donnelly	90	10%	
Majority		688		
Registered electors		3,734		
Turnout		868	23%	
Conservative hold		Swing		

=== Sandhills ===
No. 1 Sandhills
Party	Candidate	Votes	%	±%
Liberal	Thomas Salter *	1,017	55%	
Conservative	Frederick Hilditch	844	45%	
Majority		173		
Registered electors		3,463		
Turnout		1,861	54%	
Liberal hold		Swing		

=== St. Anne's ===
No. 17 St. Anne's
Party	Candidate	Votes	%	±%
Conservative	Isaac Caton Glover	1,126	51%	
Liberal	Harold Goad Crosfield	1,086	49%	
Majority		40		
Registered electors		3,383		
Turnout		2,212	65%	
Conservative gain from Liberal		Swing		

=== St. Domingo ===
No. 7 St. Domingo
Party	Candidate	Votes	%	±%
Conservative	Anthony Shelmerdine *	1,355	63%	
Liberal	Dr. Charles Ritchie Niven	792	37%	
Majority		563		
Registered electors		4,598		
Turnout		2,147	47%	
Conservative hold		Swing		

=== St. Peter's ===
No. 19 St. Peter's
Party	Candidate	Votes	%	±%
Liberal	Henry Miles *	647	62%	
Liberal Unionist	William Harold Stowe Oulton	394	38%	
Majority		253		
Registered electors		1,924		
Turnout		1,041	54%	
Liberal gain from Conservative		Swing		

=== Sefton Park East ===
No. 24A Sefton Park East
Party	Candidate	Votes	%	±%
Liberal	John Morris	unopposed		
Registered electors				
Liberal hold		Swing		

=== Sefton Park West ===
No. 24 Sefton Park West
Party	Candidate	Votes	%	±%
Conservative	Thomas Stanley Rogerson *	unopposed		
Registered electors				
Conservative hold		Swing		

=== South Scotland ===
No. 14 South Scotland
Party	Candidate	Votes	%	±%
Irish Nationalist	Francis Joseph Harford	1,242	69%	
Conservative	James Marsh	559	31%	
Majority		683		
Registered electors		3,484		
Turnout		1,801	52%	
Irish Nationalist hold		Swing		

=== Vauxhall ===
No. 15 Vauxhall
Party	Candidate	Votes	%	±%
Irish Nationalist	John Gregory Taggart	730	51%	
Conservative	Julius Jacobs	698	49%	
Majority		32		
Registered electors		2,032		
Turnout		1,428	70%	
Irish Nationalist hold		Swing		

=== Walton ===
No. 3A Walton
Party	Candidate	Votes	%	±%
Conservative	Jacob Reuben Grant	1,277	70%	
Lib-Lab	Alexander McLaren	557	30%	
Majority		720		
Registered electors		3,672		
Turnout		1,834	50%	
Conservative win (new seat)				

=== Warbreck ===
No. 27 Warbreck
Party	Candidate	Votes	%	±%
Conservative	Richard Kelly	823	90%	
Irish Nationalist	Thomas Kelly	94	10%	
Majority		729		
Registered electors		2,579		
Turnout		917	36%	
Conservative win (new seat)				

=== Wavertree ===
No. 5 Wavertree
Party	Candidate	Votes	%	±%
Conservative	Isaac Turner *	unopposed		
Registered electors				
Conservative hold		Swing		

=== West Derby ===
No. 28 West Derby
Party	Candidate	Votes	%	±%
Conservative	James Lister *	1,137	90%	
Irish Nationalist	Peter Murphy	129	10%	
Majority		1,008		
Registered electors		3,359		
Turnout		1,266	38%	
Conservative hold		Swing		

== Aldermanic elections ==
At the meeting of the Council on 9 November 1901, the terms of office of fifteen alderman expired.

The following fifteen were elected as Aldermen by the Council (Aldermen and Councillors) on 9 November 1901 for a term of six years.

* - re-elected aldermen.

Party	Alderman	Ward
Conservative	Joseph Ball JP *	
Conservative	Herbert Campbell JP *	
Conservative	Dr. Thomas Clarke *	
Conservative	Edward Hatton Cookson JP *	
Conservative	John Ellison *	
Conservative	Thomas Evans *	
Conservative	Sir William Bower Forwood JP *	
Conservative	Edward Grindley *	
Conservative	John Houlding *	
Conservative	Maxwell Hyslop Maxwell (the younger) JP *	
Conservative	Hugh McCubbin *	
Conservative	Thomas William Oakshott JP *	
Conservative	William Radcliffe JP *	
Conservative	William Roberts *	Walton
Conservative	Joachim Nicolas Stolterfoht *	

== By-elections ==
=== No. 13 North Scotland, 28 May 1902 ===
Following the death of Alderman John Houlding (Conservative), Councillor Dr. Alexander Murray Bligh (Irish Nationalist, North Scotland ward, elected 1 November 1899) was elected by the Council (Aldermen and Councillors) as an Alderman on 7 May 1902 .

No. 13 North Scotland
Party	Candidate	Votes	%	±%
Irish Nationalist	Patrick Joseph Daly	unopposed		
Registered electors				
Irish Nationalist hold		Swing		

The term of office to expire on 1 November 1902.

=== No.16 Exchange, 17 June 1902 ===
Caused by the resignation of Councillor Edmond Brownbill (Liberal, Exchange, elected 1 November 1899), which was reported to the Council on 4 June 1902.

No. 16 Exchange
Party	Candidate	Votes	%	±%
Liberal	Edmond Brownbill *	unopposed		
Registered electors				
Liberal hold		Swing		

The term of office to expire on 1 November 1902.

=== No.25 Brunswick, 15 July 1902 ===
Caused by the resignation of Councillor Charles Henry Beloe (Liberal, Brunswick, elected 1 November 1901), which was reported to the Council on 2 July 1902.

No. 25 Brunswick
Party	Candidate	Votes	%	±%
Liberal	Thomas Byrne	670		
	Knowles Stretch	515		
	James Sexton	214		
Majority		155		
Registered electors		3,305		
Turnout				
Liberal hold		Swing		

=== No. 15 Vauxhall, 21 August 1902 ===
Caused by the resignation of Councillor Thomas Burke (Irish Nationalist, elected 1 November 1900), which was reported to the Council on 6 August 1902.

No. 15 Vauxhall
Party	Candidate	Votes	%	±%
Irish Nationalist	Thomas Burke *	unopposed		
Registered electors				
Irish Nationalist hold		Swing		

The term of office to expire on 1 November 1903.

=== No. 19. St Peter's, August 1902 ===
Caused by the death of Councillor Samuel Hough (Liberal, St. Peter's, elected 1 November 1899) on 12 August 1902.

No. 19 St. Peter's
Party	Candidate	Votes	%	±%
Majority				
Registered electors				
Turnout				
	gain from	Swing		

== See also ==
- Liverpool City Council
- Liverpool Town Council elections 1835 - 1879
- Liverpool City Council elections 1880–present
- Mayors and Lord Mayors of Liverpool 1207 to present
- History of local government in England
