= 1911 Liverpool City Council election =

Liverpool City Council elections 1911

- November 1, 1911

35 seats were up for election (one third): one seat for each of the 35 wards 69 (incl. Aldermen) seats needed for a majority

Elections to Liverpool City Council were held on 1 November 1911.

Sixteen of the thirty-five wards were uncontested.

After the election, the composition of the council was:

Party	Councillors	±	Aldermen	Total
Conservative	??	-3	??	??
Liberal	??	-3	??	??
Irish Nationalist	??	0	3	??
Labour	??	+6	0	??
Independent	??	0	??	??

== Election result ==
Liverpool local election result 1911
Party	Seats	Gains	Losses	Net gain/loss	Seats %	Votes %	Votes	+/−
Conservative	15	0	3	-3	43%	46%	16,767	
Liberal	10	0	3	-3	29%	5%	2,009	
Labour	7	6	0	+6	20%	41%	14,966	
Irish Nationalist	3	0	0	0	9%	2.2%	806	
Independents	0	0	0	0	0%	6.1%	2,235	

Given the significant number of uncontested wards, these statistics should be taken in context.

== Ward results ==
* - Retiring Councillor seeking re-election

Comparisons are made with the 1908 election results, as the retiring councillors were elected in that year.

=== Abercromby ===
No. 21 Abercromby
Party	Candidate	Votes	%	±%
Conservative	Charles Henry Hayhurst	unopposed		
Registered electors				
Conservative hold		Swing		

=== Aigburth ===
No. 29 Aigburth
Party	Candidate	Votes	%	±%
Conservative	Hartley Wilson *	unopposed		
Registered electors				
Conservative hold		Swing		

=== Anfield ===
No. 3 Anfield
Party	Candidate	Votes	%	±%
Liberal	William Evans *	unopposed		
Registered electors				
Liberal hold		Swing		

=== Breckfield ===
No. 6 Breckfield
Party	Candidate	Votes	%	±%
Conservative	Frank John Leslie *	966	53%	
Labour	Robert Donaldson	867	47%	
Majority		99		
Registered electors		4,225		
Turnout		1,833	43%	
Conservative hold		Swing		

=== Brunswick ===
No. 19 Brunswick
Party	Candidate	Votes	%	±%
Labour	Thomas James Hickling	781	54%	
Liberal	Thomas Roberts *	667	46%	
Majority		114		
Registered electors		2,661		
Turnout		1,448	54%	
Labour gain from Liberal		Swing		

=== Castle Street ===
No. 18 Castle Street
Party	Candidate	Votes	%	±%
Liberal	Richard George Hough *	unopposed		
Registered electors				
Liberal hold		Swing		

=== Dingle ===
No. 26 Dingle
Party	Candidate	Votes	%	±%
Conservative	Dr. Richard Caton *	1,686	55%	
Labour	John Frederick Bower	1,360	45%	
Majority		326		
Registered electors		5,785		
Turnout		3,046	53%	
Conservative hold		Swing		

=== Edge Hill ===
No. 12 Edge Hill
Party	Candidate	Votes	%	±%
Labour	William Richard Blair	1,544	57%	
Conservative	Alfred James Branwood	1,159	43%	
Majority		385		
Registered electors		4,848		
Turnout		2,703	56%	
Labour gain from Conservative		Swing		

=== Everton ===
No. 21 Everton
Party	Candidate	Votes	%	±%
Labour	John Henry Naylor	983	58%	
Liberal	William Denton *	718	42%	
Majority		265		
Registered electors		4,484		
Turnout		1,701	38%	
Labour gain from Liberal		Swing		

=== Exchange ===
No. 16 Exchange
Party	Candidate	Votes	%	±%
Liberal	Joseph Bibby *	unopposed		
Registered electors				
Liberal hold		Swing		

=== Fairfield ===
No. 4 Fairfield
Party	Candidate	Votes	%	±%
Conservative	Thomas Dowd *	861	71%	
Independent	Arthur Evans Kennedy	352	29%	
Majority		509		
Registered electors		3,991		
Turnout		1,213	30%	
Conservative hold		Swing		

=== Fazakerley ===
No. 31 Fazakerley
Party	Candidate	Votes	%	±%
Conservative	Dr. Henry Herbert Clarke	252	67%	
Independent	George Lovely	123	33%	
Majority		129		
Registered electors		752		
Turnout		375	50%	
Conservative hold		Swing		

=== Garston ===
No. 37 Garston
Party	Candidate	Votes	%	±%
Labour	William Albert Robinson	1,035	62%	
Liberal	James Pickthall *	624	38%	
Majority		411		
Registered electors		2,258		
Turnout		1,659		
Labour gain from Liberal		Swing		

=== Granby ===
No. 22 Granby
Party	Candidate	Votes	%	±%
Liberal	John Lea *	unopposed		
Registered electors				
Liberal hold		Swing		

=== Great George ===
No. 17 Great George
Party	Candidate	Votes	%	±%
Liberal	John Lamport Ellis *	unopposed		
Registered electors				
Liberal hold		Swing		

=== Kensington ===
No. 9 Kensington
Party	Candidate	Votes	%	±%
Conservative	John Gordon *	1,260	51%	
Labour	Arthur Kilpin Bulley	1,234	49%	
Majority		26	2%	
Registered electors		4,718		
Turnout		2,494	53%	
Conservative hold		Swing		

=== Kirkdale ===
No. 2 Kirkdale
Party	Candidate	Votes	%	±%
Conservative	Dr. John Utting *	1,625	53%	
Labour	William McLean	1,456	47%	
Majority		169		
Registered electors		6,476		
Turnout		3,081	48%	
Conservative hold		Swing		

=== Low Hill ===
No. 10 Low Hill
Party	Candidate	Votes	%	±%
Labour	George Nelson	993	51%	
Conservative	David Pearson *	955	49%	
Majority		38	2%	N/A
Registered electors		3,909		
Turnout		1,948	50%	
Labour gain from Conservative		Swing		

=== Netherfield ===
No. 8 Netherfield
Party	Candidate	Votes	%	±%
Conservative	Harold Edward Davies	855	46%	
Labour	Joseph Chaloner	722	39%	
Independent	John Carr	268	15%	
Majority		133		
Registered electors		4,015		
Turnout		1,845	46%	
Conservative hold		Swing		

=== North Scotland ===
No. 13 North Scotland
Party	Candidate	Votes	%	±%
Irish Nationalist	James Bolger *	unopposed		
Registered electors				
Irish Nationalist hold		Swing		

=== Old Swan ===
No. 28A Old Swan
Party	Candidate	Votes	%	±%
Conservative	John Edwards *	unopposed		
Registered electors				
Conservative hold		Swing		

=== Prince's Park ===
No. 23 Prince's Park
Party	Candidate	Votes	%	±%
Liberal	Acheson Lyle Rupert Rathbone *	unopposed		
Registered electors				
Liberal hold		Swing		

=== Sandhills ===
No. 1 Sandhills
Party	Candidate	Votes	%	±%
Irish Nationalist	John Cunningham	806	63%	
Independent Irish Nationalist	Patrick Joseph Deery *	465	37%	
Majority		341		
Registered electors		3,539		
Turnout		1,271	36%	
Irish Nationalist hold		Swing		

=== St. Anne's ===
No. 17 St. Anne's
Party	Candidate	Votes	%	±%
Labour	James Sexton *	913	51%	
Conservative	Richard Joseph Ward	870	49%	
Majority		43	2%	
Registered electors		2,735		
Turnout		1,783	65%	
Labour hold		Swing		

=== St. Domingo ===
No. 7 St. Domingo
Party	Candidate	Votes	%	±%
Labour	James Stephenson	939	38%	
Conservative	David John Willams	798	33%	
Ind. Conservative	George William Whittaker *	715	29%	
Majority		141		
Registered electors		4,547		
Turnout		2,452	54%	
Labour gain from Conservative		Swing		

=== St. Peter's ===
No. 19 St. Peter's
Party	Candidate	Votes	%	±%
Liberal	Burton William Ellis *	unopposed		
Registered electors				
Liberal hold		Swing		

=== Sefton Park East ===
No. 24A Sefton Park East
Party	Candidate	Votes	%	±%
Conservative	Reginald George Layton *	1,465	82%	
Independent	George Porter	312	18%	
Majority		1,153		
Registered electors		3,846		
Turnout		1,777	46%	
Conservative hold		Swing		

=== Sefton Park West ===
No. 24 Sefton Park West
Party	Candidate	Votes	%	±%
Conservative	Ernest Cranstoun Given	unopposed		
Registered electors				
Conservative hold		Swing		

=== South Scotland ===
No. 14 South Scotland
Party	Candidate	Votes	%	±%
Irish Nationalist	Austin Harford *	unopposed		
Registered electors				
Irish Nationalist hold		Swing		

=== Vauxhall ===
No. 15 Vauxhall
Party	Candidate	Votes	%	±%
Liberal	Max Muspratt *	unopposed		
Registered electors				
Liberal hold		Swing		

=== Walton ===
No. 3A Walton
Party	Candidate	Votes	%	±%
Conservative	Sampson Gannon	1,687	67%	
Labour	Harry Dawson Large	840	33%	
Majority		847		
Registered electors		5,079		
Turnout		2,527	50%	
Conservative hold		Swing		

=== Warbreck ===
No. 27 Warbreck
Party	Candidate	Votes	%	±%
Liberal	Edward West *	unopposed		
Registered electors				
Liberal hold		Swing		

=== Wavertree ===
No. 5 Wavertree
Party	Candidate	Votes	%	±%
Liberal	Charles Clarke Morrison *	unopposed		
Registered electors				
Liberal hold		Swing		

=== Wavertree West ===
No. 5A Wavertree West
Party	Candidate	Votes	%	±%
Conservative	Edmund Gerson Jackson *	1,214	56%	
Labour	William Augustus Colcutt	972	44%	
Majority		242		
Registered electors		3,671		
Turnout		2,186	60%	
Conservative hold		Swing		

=== West Derby ===
No. 28 West Derby
Party	Candidate	Votes	%	±%
Conservative	William James Bailes *	1,114	77%	
Labour	James Murphy	327	23%	
Majority		787		
Registered electors		3,512		
Turnout		1,441	41%	
Conservative hold		Swing		

== Aldermanic Election ==
Caused by the death of Alderman William Humphrey Williams (Conservative elected 9 November 1910)

== By-Elections ==
=== No. 26 Dingle, 16 May 1912 ===
Caused by the resignation of Councillor Algernon Charles Francis Henderson (Conservative, Dingle, elected 1 November 1910), which was reported to the Council on 1 May 1912.

No. 26 Dingle
Party	Candidate	Votes	%	±%
Conservative	Alfred James Branwood	1,625	63%	
Labour	John Frederick Bower	971	37%	
Majority		326		
Registered electors		5,785		
Turnout		2,596	45%	
Conservative hold		Swing		

The Term of Office to expire on 1 November 1913

=== No. 1 Sandhills, 16 May 1912 ===
Caused by the death of Councillor Michael Edward Kearney (Irish Nationalist, Sandhills, elected unopposed 1 November 1909)

No. 1 Sandhills
Party	Candidate	Votes	%	±%
Irish Nationalist	Thomas Wafer Byrne	unopposed		
Registered electors				
Irish Nationalist hold		Swing		

The Term of Office to end on 1 November 1912.

=== No. 23 St. Domingo ===
Caused by the death of Councillor Joseph Roby (Conservative, St. Domingo, last elected 1 November 1909) on 23 July 1912.

== See also ==
- Liverpool City Council
- Liverpool Town Council elections 1835 - 1879
- Liverpool City Council elections 1880–present
- Mayors and Lord Mayors of Liverpool 1207 to present
- History of local government in England
