= Granby (Liverpool ward) =

Former metropolitan borough council ward in England

- Granby ward within Liverpool
- Metropolitan borough: City of Liverpool
- Metropolitan county: Merseyside
- Region: North West
- Country: England
- Sovereign state: United Kingdom
- UK Parliament: Liverpool East Toxteth (1895-1950); Liverpool Exchange (1950-1973); Liverpool Riverside (1983-2002)

Granby ward was an electoral district of Liverpool City Council. The ward was centred on the Princes Park district of Liverpool.

== Background ==
The ward was created in 1895 to accommodate the expanding city. It was reformed in 1953 and was merged with Princes Park ward in 1973. Granby ward was reinstated in 1980 before being finally dissolved in 2003.

=== 1895 boundaries ===
The ward was part of the Liverpool East Toxteth Parliamentary constituency.

=== 1953 boundaries ===
1953 boundaries

Liverpool City Council ward boundaries were changed prior to the 1953 election; the boundaries of Granby ward were unchanged.

=== 1973 election ===
Following the Local Government Act 1972 the ward boundaries of the council were altered. The number of wards was reduced from 40 to 33 and the aldermanic system was abolished. Granby ward was merged with Princes Park ward to form Granby, Princes Park ward.

=== 1980 boundaries ===
A report of the Local Government Boundary Commission for England published in November 1978 set out proposals for changes to the wards of Liverpool City Council, maintaining the number of councillors at 99 representing 33 wards. Granby ward was re-established to be represented by three councillors.

The boundaries were unchanged from those of Granby, Princes Park ward. The report describes the boundaries of Granby ward as "Commencing at a point where Ullet Road meets Park Road, thence northwestwards along said Park Road to the southern boundary of Abercromby Ward, thence northeastwards, northwestwards and northeastwards along said boundary to the southern boundary of Smithdown Ward, thence continuing northeastwards along said boundary to the western boundary of Arundel Ward, thence southwards along said boundary to Ullet Road, thence southwestwards along said road to the point of commencement".

Until 1983 the ward was part of the Liverpool Scotland Exchange Parliamentary constituency and from 1983 was part of the Liverpool Riverside Parliamentary constituency.

=== 2004 election ===
A review by the Boundary Committee for England recommended that the council was formed of a reduced number of 90 members elected from 30 wards. Granby ward was dissolved and distributed into the new Princes Park ward.

== Councillors ==
Election	Councillor	Councillor	Councillor
1895	John Lea (Lib)	Albert Samuel (Con)	Herbert Campbell (Con)
1896	John Lea (Lib)	Albert Samuel (Con)	Herbert Campbell (Con)
1897	John Lea (Lib)	Albert Samuel (Con)	Herbert Campbell (Con)
1898	John Lea (Lib)	Albert Samuel (Con)	Robert Bullen (Lib)
1899	John Lea (Lib)	Albert Samuel (Con)	Robert Bullen (Lib)
1900	John Lea (Lib)	Joseph Jones (Lib)	Robert Bullen (Lib)
1901	John Lea (Lib)	Joseph Jones (Lib)	Robert Bullen (Lib)
1902	John Lea (Lib)	Joseph Jones (Lib)	Robert Bullen (Lib)
1903	John Lea (Lib)	Joseph Jones (Lib)	Robert Bullen (Lib)
1904	John Lea (Lib)	Joseph Jones (Lib)	Robert Bullen (Lib)
1905	John Lea (Lib)	Joseph Jones (Lib)	Robert Bullen (Lib)
1906	John Lea (Lib)	Joseph Jones (Lib)	Robert Bullen (Lib)
1907	John Lea (Lib)	Joseph Jones (Lib)	Robert Bullen (Lib)
1908	John Lea (Lib)	Joseph Jones (Lib)	Robert Bullen (Lib)
1909	John Lea (Lib)	Joseph Jones (Lib)	Eleanor Rathbone (Ind)^{[a]}
1910	John Lea (Lib)	Joseph Jones (Lib)	Eleanor Rathbone (Ind)
1911	John Lea (Lib)	Joseph Jones (Lib)	Eleanor Rathbone (Ind)
1912	James Waterworth (Con)^{[b]}	Joseph Jones (Lib)	Eleanor Rathbone (Ind)
1913	James Waterworth (Con)	Joseph Jones (Lib)	Eleanor Rathbone (Ind)
1914	James Waterworth (Con)	Joseph Jones (Lib)	Eleanor Rathbone (Ind)
No elections were held between 1915 and 1919 due to the First World War
1919	James Waterworth (Con)	Joseph Jones (Lib)	Eleanor Rathbone (Ind)
1920	James Waterworth (Con)	Frederick Bowring (Lib)^{[c]}	Eleanor Rathbone (Ind)
1921	James Waterworth (Con)	Frederick Bowring (Lib)	Eleanor Rathbone (Ind)
1922	James Waterworth (Con)	Frederick Bowring (Lib)	Eleanor Rathbone (Ind)
1923	James Waterworth (Con)	Frederick Bowring (Lib)	Eleanor Rathbone (Ind)
1924	Rosa Hoch (Con)	Frederick Bowring (Lib)	Eleanor Rathbone (Ind)
1925	Rosa Hoch (Con)	Frederick Bowring (Lib)	Eleanor Rathbone (Ind)
1926	Rosa Hoch (Con)	Frederick Bowring (Lib)	Eleanor Rathbone (Ind)
1927	James Johnstone (Lab)	Frederick Bowring (Lib)	Eleanor Rathbone (Ind)
1928	James Johnstone (Lab)	Frederick Bowring (Lib)	Eleanor Rathbone (Ind)
1929	James Johnstone (Lab)	Frederick Bowring (Lib)	Eleanor Rathbone (Ind)
1930	William Edwards (Con)	Frederick Bowring (Lib)	Eleanor Rathbone (Ind)
1931	William Edwards (Con)	Frederick Bowring (Lib)	Eleanor Rathbone (Ind)
1932	William Edwards (Con)	Frederick Bowring (Lib)	Eleanor Rathbone (Ind)
1933	William Edwards (Con)	Frederick Bowring (Lib)	Eleanor Rathbone (Ind)
1934	William Edwards (Con)	Mary Cumella (Lab)	Eleanor Rathbone (Ind)
1935	William Edwards (Con)	Mary Cumella (Lab)	Charles Burke (Lab)
1936	William Edwards (Con)	Mary Cumella (Lab)	Charles Burke (Lab)
1937	Walter Clark (Con)^{[d]}	Ernest Tyrer (Con)	Charles Burke (Lab)
1938	Walter Clark (Con)	Ernest Tyrer (Con)	James Thompson (Con)
No elections were held between 1939 and 1944 due to the Second World War
1945	Elizabeth Trainor (Lab)	Ernest Tyrer (Con)	James Thompson (Con)
1946	Elizabeth Trainor (Lab)	Walter Clarke (Con)	James Thompson (Con)
1947	Elizabeth Trainor (Lab)	Walter Clarke (Con)	James Thompson (Con)
1949	William Heald (Con)	Walter Clarke (Con)	James Thompson (Con)
1950	William Heald (Con)	Walter Clarke (Con)	James Thompson (Con)
1951	William Heald (Con)	Walter Clarke (Con)	James Thompson (Con)
1952	William Brodie (Lab)	Walter Clarke (Con)	James Thompson (Con)
WARD REFORMED
1953	J. Guinan (Lab)	William Brodie (Lab)	Elizabeth Trainor (Lab)

indicates seat up for re-election after boundary changes.

indicates seat up for re-election.

indicates change in affiliation.

indicates seat up for re-election after casual vacancy.

=== Notes ===
a. Cllr Robert Henry Bullen (Liberal, 1907) died in 1909; a by-election was held on 7 October 1909.

b. Cllr John Lea (Liberal, 1911) was elected as an alderman on 9 November 1912 and vacated his seat as a councillor, a by-election was held on 27 November 1912.

c. Cllr Joseph Harrison Jones (Liberal, 1918) was elected as an alderman on 9 November 1920 and vacated his seat as a councillor, a by-election was held on 23 November 1920.

d. Cllr Walter Clark (Conservative, 1936) died on 28 April 1937. A by-election was held on 17 June 1937.
