= Walton (Liverpool ward) =

Electoral division in England

Walton ward is an electoral division of Liverpool City Council centred on the Walton area of the city. It was created in 1900 when three councillors were elected and dissolved in 1953.

The ward was recreated in 2023 following a review by the Local Government Boundary Commission for England which decided that the existing 30 wards each represented by three Councillors should be replaced by 64 wards represented by 85 councillors with varying representation by one, two or three councillors per ward. The Walton ward was reinstated as a two-member ward, taking the majority of the former Warbreck ward with small sections of the former County, Fazakerley and Norris Green wards.

== Councillors ==
Election	Councillor	Councillor	Councillor
1953 - 2022 WARD DISESTABLISHED
2023	Sam East (Lab)	Bev Kenyon (Lab)	

indicates seat up for re-election after boundary changes.

indicates seat up for re-election.

indicates change in affiliation.

indicates seat up for re-election after casual vacancy.

== Election results ==
=== Elections of the 2020s ===
4th May 2023
Party	Candidate	Votes	%	±%
Labour	Sam East^{§}	1,355	35.24	
Labour	Beverley Ann Kenyon	1,067	27.75	
Liberal Democrats	Karen Elisabeth Afford	459	11.94	
Independent	John Paul Hanlon	444	11.55	
Liberal Democrats	Graham Hulme	200	5.20	
Independent	John Anthony Leather	174	4.53	
Green	Jack Joseph Hughes	146	3.80	
Majority		896		
Registered electors		9,045		
Turnout				
Rejected ballots		8		
Total ballots				
Labour win (new seat)				
Labour win (new seat)				

^{§}Sam East was a re-standing councillor for the former Warbreck ward.
