= Dingle (Liverpool ward) =

Electoral division in England

- Dingle ward within Liverpool
- Population: 7,842 (2023 electorate)
- Metropolitan borough: City of Liverpool
- Metropolitan county: Merseyside
- Region: North West
- Country: England
- Sovereign state: United Kingdom
- UK Parliament: Liverpool Riverside
- Councillors: Sarah Doyle (Labour Party); Steve Munby (Labour Party)

Dingle ward is an electoral division of Liverpool City Council centred on the Dingle area of the city. It was created in 1895 from part of the previous Toxteth Park ward where three councillors were elected. Its boundaries were changed in 1953, 1973, 1980 before being dissolved in 2004 where it was split into the new Riverside and St Michael's wards.

The ward was recreated in 2023 following a review by the Local Government Boundary Commission for England which decided that the existing 30 wards each represented by three Councillors should be replaced by 64 wards represented by 85 councillors with varying representation by one, two or three councillors per ward. The Dingle ward was reinstated as a two-member ward from the southern portions of the former Riverside ward and a small part of the former Princes Park ward. The new ward is represented by two councillors. The ward contains the Florence Institute and High Park Reservoir

== Councillors ==
Election	Councillor	Councillor	Councillor
2004 - 2022 WARD DISESTABLISHED
2023	Sarah Doyle (Lab)	Steve Munby (Lab)	

indicates seat up for re-election after boundary changes.

indicates seat up for re-election.

indicates change in affiliation.

indicates seat up for re-election after casual vacancy.

== Election results ==
=== Elections of the 2020s ===
4th May 2023
Party	Candidate	Votes	%	±%
Labour	Sarah Doyle^{§}	1,317	38.79	
Labour	Steve Munby^{§}	1,298	38.23	
Green	Anna Corkill	376	11.08	
Green	Kevin Alan Hill	207	6.10	
Liberal Democrats	Peter Joseph Rainford	122	3.59	
Conservative	Margaret Shepherd Crichton	75	2.21	
Majority		941		
Turnout				
Rejected ballots		20		
Total ballots				
Registered electors		7,842		
Labour win (new seat)				
Labour win (new seat)				

^{§}Sarah Doyle and Steve Munby were re-standing councillors for the former Riverside ward.
