= 1945 Liverpool City Council election =

1945 UK local election

← 1938	1 November 1945	1946 →
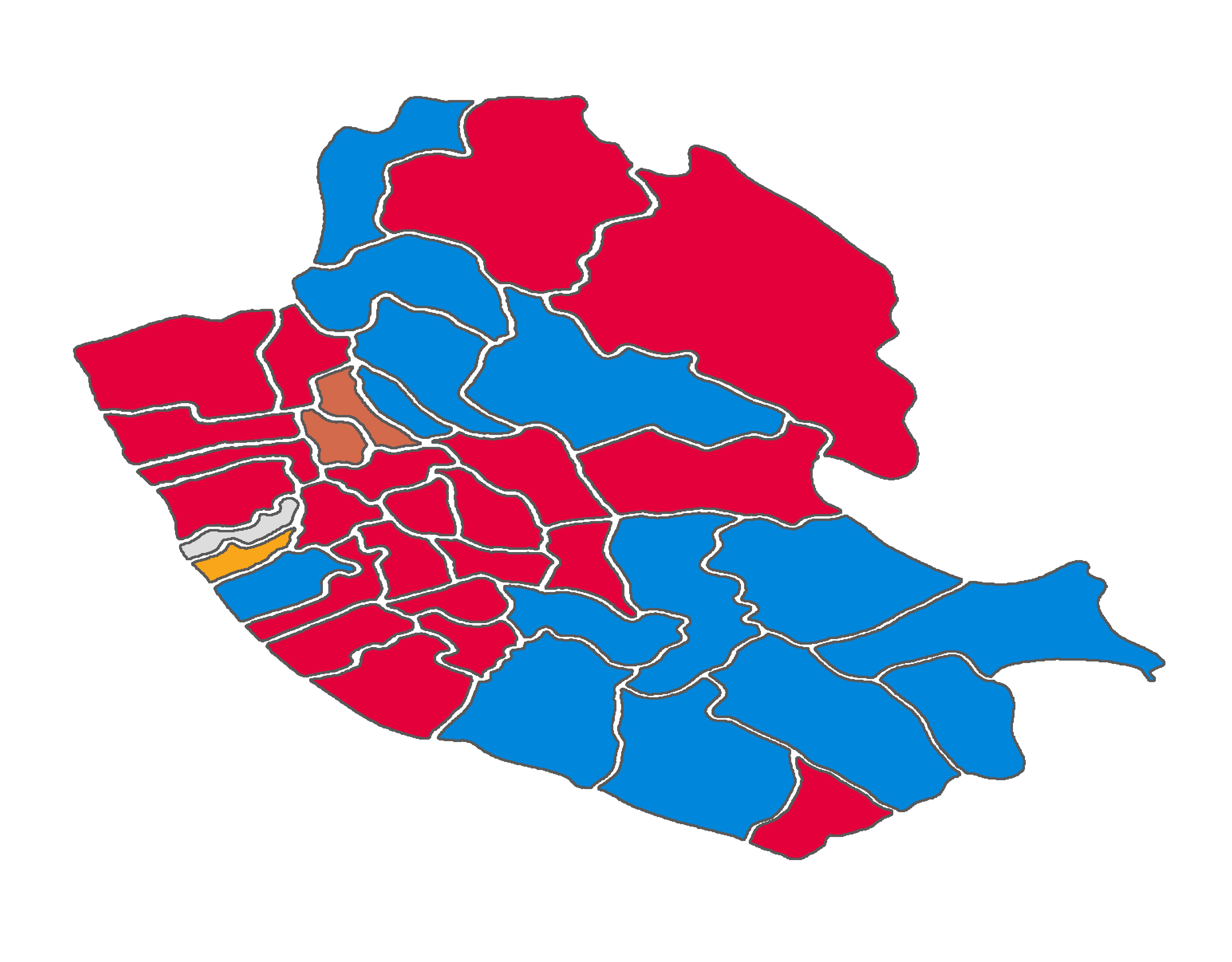
- Map of Liverpool showing wards won (first placed party)

Elections to Liverpool City Council were held on Thursday 1 November 1945. It was the first local election in which all those who qualified for a parliamentary vote could vote.

After the election, the composition of the council was:

Party	Councillors	±	Aldermen
Conservative	66	-6	24
Labour	44	+11	8
Liberal	2	-4	4
Protestant	4	+1	1
Independent	3	-1	2

== Election result ==
Liverpool local election result 1945
Party	Seats	Gains	Losses	Net gain/loss	Seats %	Votes %	Votes	+/−
Conservative	21					45%	81,337	
Labour	35					47%	86,200	
Liberal	1					3.6%	6,550	
Protestant	2					2.2%	4,067	
Independent	2					1.4%	2,576	
Communist	0				0%	0.54%	981	

== Ward results ==
* - Councillor seeking re-election

^{(PARTY)} - Party of former Councillor

As this was the first election since the disruption caused by the Second World War no comparisons are made.

=== Abercromby ===
Abercromby - 2 seats
Party	Candidate	Votes	%	±%
Labour	Francis Lavery	2,466	56%	
Labour	Harry Livermore	2,439	55%	
Conservative	Joseph James E. Sloan	1,963	44%	
Conservative	George Bowman	1,961	44%	
Majority		503		
Registered electors		12,663		
Turnout		4,429	35%	

=== Aigburth ===
Aigburth
Party	Candidate	Votes	%	±%
Conservative	Herbert Mylrea Allen	4,468	60%	
Labour	John Francis Carr	1,505	20%	
Liberal	Vera Catherine Davie	827	11%	
Independent	Arthur Jas. Holland	673	9%	
Majority		2,963		
Registered electors		16,061		
Turnout		7,473	47%	

=== Allerton ===
Allerton
Party	Candidate	Votes	%	±%
Conservative	Charles Haswell	2,369	52%	
Labour	William Dean-Jones	1,392	31%	
Liberal	Herbert Griffith Edwards	761	17%	
Majority		977		
Registered electors		9,784		
Turnout		4,522	46%	

=== Anfield ===
Anfield
Party	Candidate	Votes	%	±%
Conservative	Aled Owen Roberts	3,818	56%	
Labour	Eric Barnes	3,031	44%	
Majority		787		
Registered electors		16,905		
Turnout		6,849	41%	

=== Breckfield ===
Breckfield
Party	Candidate	Votes	%	±%
Conservative	David John Lewis	2,554	51%	
Labour	William Tipping	2,499	49%	
Majority		55		
Registered electors		12,201		
Turnout		5,053	41%	

=== Brunswick ===
Brunswick - 2 seats
Party	Candidate	Votes	%	±%
Labour	Andrew Basnett	unopposed		
Labour	Frank Hampton Cain	unopposed		
Majority				
Registered electors		6,410		
Turnout				

=== Castle Street ===
Castle Street
Party	Candidate	Votes	%	±%
Liberal	William S.S. Hannay	525	96%	
Labour	A. Kay	24	4%	
Majority		501		
Registered electors		910		
Turnout		549	60%	

=== Childwall ===
Childwall - 2 seats
Party	Candidate	Votes	%	±%
Conservative	William J. Matthew Clark	3,281	53%	
Conservative	Alexander Young	3,105	50%	
Labour	Albert Clegg	1,857	30%	
Labour	Alice Elliott	1,733	28%	
Liberal	John Richard Jones	1,070	17%	
Liberal	Lilian Howorth	909	15%	
Majority		1,424		
Registered electors		12,988		
Turnout		6,208	48%	

=== Croxteth ===
Croxteth - 2 seats
Party	Candidate	Votes	%	±%
Labour	James Cullen	5,205	82%	
Labour	William Henry Barton	5,091	80%	
Independent	James Charles Pollard	1,164	18%	
Majority		4,041		
Registered electors		29,224		
Turnout		6,369	22%	

=== Dingle ===
Dingle
Party	Candidate	Votes	%	±%
Labour	Edward Daniel Whittle	3,919	53%	
Conservative	George Horrace Duckett	3,523	47%	
Majority		396		
Registered electors		17,363		
Turnout		7,442	43%	

=== Edge Hill ===
Edge Hill - 2 seats
Party	Candidate	Votes	%	±%
Labour	James Johnstone	3,113	64%	
Labour	John Bagot	3,082	64%	
Conservative	Joseph Parry	1,733	36%	
Conservative	Charles Stamper	1,676	35%	
Majority		1,380		
Registered electors		12,736		
Turnout		4,846	38%	

=== Everton ===
Everton
Party	Candidate	Votes	%	±%
Labour	John Leslie Hughes	unopposed		
Registered electors		12,593		

=== Exchange ===
Exchange - 2 seats
Party	Candidate	Votes	%	±%
Independent	Leo Henry Wright	728	74%	
Independent	Walter McGrath	721	73%	
Labour	Sarah Ann McArd	252	26%	
Labour	Herbert F. Granby	257	26%	
Majority		471		
Registered electors		1,619		
Turnout		985	61%	

=== Fairfield ===
Fairfield - 3 seats
Party	Candidate	Votes	%	±%
Labour	Henry V. Cove	3,159	46%	
Labour	Isadore Levin	3,088	45%	
Conservative	Robert Meadows	3,022	44%	
Conservative	Charles Tillson	2,992	43%	
Labour	Edward William Harby	2,984	43%	
Conservative	James C. Cotdon	2,932	42%	
Liberal	William Henry Ledsom	755	11%	
Liberal	Charles Frederick Elias	553	8%	
Liberal	Leonard Baines	467	7%	
Majority		137		
Registered electors		14,457		
Turnout		6,936	48%	

=== Fazakerley ===
Fazakerley
Party	Candidate	Votes	%	±%
Labour	Joseph L. Morgan	4,393	63%	
Conservative	Robert A. Smith	2,576	37%	
Majority		1,817		
Registered electors		19,248		
Turnout		6,969	36%	

=== Garston ===
Garston
Party	Candidate	Votes	%	±%
Labour	Alfred Demain	3,950	66%	
Conservative	William Fletcher	2,008	34%	
Majority		1,942		
Registered electors		14,994		
Turnout		5,958	40%	

=== Granby ===
Granby
Party	Candidate	Votes	%	±%
Labour	Elizabeth Trainor	2,344	53%	
Conservative	Walter Clarke	2,065	47%	
Majority		279		
Registered electors		12,424		
Turnout		4,409	35%	

=== Great George ===
Great George - 2 seats
Party	Candidate	Votes	%	±%
Labour	Robert Edward Cottier	unopposed		
Labour	John David Towers	unopposed		
Registered electors		3,720		

=== Kensington ===
Kensington - 2 seats
Party	Candidate	Votes	%	±%
Labour	John Matthew Taylor	2,827	51%	
Labour	Joseph Brogan	2,812	51%	
Conservative	Jack Creswell	2,663	49%	
Conservative	Stephen Minion	2,616	48%	
Majority		162		
Registered electors		13,466		
Turnout		5,492	41%	

=== Kirkdale ===
Kirkdale
Party	Candidate	Votes	%	±%
Labour	Peter McKernan	4,340	60%	
Conservative	William E. McLachlan	2,863	40%	
Majority		1,477		
Registered electors		18,333		
Turnout		7,203	39%	

=== Little Woolton ===
Little Woolton - 2 seats
Party	Candidate	Votes	%	±%
Conservative	James Forster Brakell	715	68%	
Conservative	Gordon Frederick Catlin	671	64%	
Liberal	Marshal Fraser McGregor	196	19%	
Labour	Margaret Ella Doughty	137	13%	
Majority		519		
Registered electors		1,456		
Turnout		1,048	72%	

=== Low Hill ===
Low Hill - 2 seats
Party	Candidate	Votes	%	±%
Labour	Fred Robinson	2,963	55%	
Labour	David Horan	2,880	54%	
Conservative	Samuel Cecil Saltmarsh	2,420	45%	
Conservative	George Moore	2,315	43%	
Majority		543		
Registered electors		11,568		
Turnout		5,383	47%	

=== Much Woolton ===
Much Woolton
Party	Candidate	Votes	%	±%
Conservative	Reginald Wm. Stewart	1,541	59%	
Labour	Griffith D. Ellis	1,084	41%	
Majority		457		
Registered electors		5,180		
Turnout		2,625	51%	

=== Netherfield ===
Netherfield
Party	Candidate	Votes	%	±%
Protestant	George E. Lewis	1,611	51%	
Labour	William J. Riddick	1,562	49%	
Majority		48		
Registered electors		10,653		
Turnout		3,174	30%	

=== North Scotland ===
North Scotland - 2 seats
Party	Candidate	Votes	%	±%
Labour	Thomas Fay	1,690	63%	
Labour	Frederick W. Tucker	1,546	58%	
Communist	Leo McGree	981	37%	
Majority		709		
Registered electors		6,778		
Turnout		2,671	39%	

=== Old Swan ===
Old Swan
Party	Candidate	Votes	%	±%
Labour	Samuel Cantor	5,497	53%	
Conservative	Ernest Walker	4,874	47%	
Majority		623		
Registered electors		26,860		
Turnout		10,371	39%	

=== Prince's Park ===
Prince's Park - 2 seats
Party	Candidate	Votes	%	±%
Labour	Sarah Ann Demain	2,476	54%	
Labour	Henry Evans	2,407	54%	
Conservative	Charles Cowlin	2,082	46%	
Conservative	Thomas Thompson	2,044	45%	
Majority		394		
Registered electors		11,593		
Turnout		4,558	39%	

=== Sandhills ===
Sandhills
Party	Candidate	Votes	%	±%
Labour	Henry Aldritt	unopposed		
Registered electors		7,277		

=== St. Anne's ===
St. Anne's - 2 seats
Party	Candidate	Votes	%	±%
Labour	Elizabeth M. Braddock M.P.	unopposed		
Labour	Abraham Louis Caplan	unopposed		
Registered electors		5,996		

=== St. Domingo ===
St. Domingo
Party	Candidate	Votes	%	±%
Protestant	Albert Victor Harris	2,456	55%	
Labour	Charles Gallacher	1,970	45%	
Majority		486		
Registered electors		12,399		
Turnout		4,426	36%	

=== St. Peter's ===
St. Peter's
Party	Candidate	Votes	%	±%
Conservative	John D.R.T. Tilney	423	72%	
Labour	Peter James O'Hare	154	26%	
Independent and anti war	F.Bowman	11	2%	
Majority		269		
Registered electors		1,108		
Turnout		588	53%	

=== Sefton Park East ===
Sefton Park East - 2 seats
Party	Candidate	Votes	%	±%
Conservative	John Frank N. Holland	3,352	66%	
Conservative	Arthur Maiden	3,268	65%	
Labour	Margaret Roberts	1,700	34%	
Labour	Louie Viner	1,517	30%	
Majority		1,652		
Registered electors		13,664		
Turnout		5,052	37%	

=== Sefton Park West ===
Sefton Park West - 2 seats
Party	Candidate	Votes	%	±%
Conservative	Arthur Brierley Collins	3,104	66%	
Conservative	Frederick Bidston	3,043	64%	
Labour	Cecil Ronffignac	1,618	34%	
Labour	John Eric Yeadon	1,565	33%	
Majority		1,486		
Registered electors		10,398		
Turnout		4,722	45%	

=== South Scotland ===
South Scotland
Party	Candidate	Votes	%	±%
Labour	Michael John Reppion	unopposed		
Registered electors		5,971		

=== Vauxhall ===
Vauxhall - 2 seats
Party	Candidate	Votes	%	±%
Labour	Joseph Cyril Brady	unopposed		
Labour	Thomas Hogan	unopposed		
Registered electors		2,526		

=== Walton ===
Walton
Party	Candidate	Votes	%	±%
Conservative	Richard Edward Searle	4,681	48%	
Labour	Arthur Jas. Brownlow	4,508	46%	
Liberal	Evan Llewellyn Lloyd	594	6%	
Majority		173		
Registered electors		22,454		
Turnout		9,783	44%	

=== Warbreck ===
Warbreck - 2 seats
Party	Candidate	Votes	%	±%
Conservative	Herbert W. Metcalfe	3,648	49%	
Conservative	John Green	3,637	49%	
Labour	Frederick J. Hughes	2,354	32%	
Labour	William H. Pugh	2,325	31%	
Liberal	Walter Howarth	1,450	19%	
Liberal	Marv. G. Ruddy	1,371	18%	
Majority		1,294		
Registered electors		19,161		
Turnout		7,452	39%	

=== Wavertree ===
Wavertree
Party	Candidate	Votes	%	±%
Conservative	Harold Threlfall Wilson	6,100	58%	
Labour	Joseph Brian Alexander	4,447	42%	
Majority		1,653		
Registered electors		22,419		
Turnout		10,547	47%	

=== Wavertree West ===
Wavertree West
Party	Candidate	Votes	%	±%
Labour	Charles James Minton	2,517	51%	
Conservative	Florence Blume Levy	2,011	41%	
Liberal	Douglas Kilgour Mitchell	372	8%	
Majority		506		
Registered electors		10,994		
Turnout		4,900	45%	

=== West Derby ===
West Derby - 2 seats
Party	Candidate	Votes	%	±%
Conservative	Robert C. Beattie	7,478	59%	
Conservative	Hedley A. Williams	7,477	59.5%	
Labour	John C. Carroll	5,241	41.5%	
Labour	Thomas W. Jolley	5,313	42.5%	
Majority		2,237		
Registered electors		30,484		
Turnout		12,719	425	

== Aldermanic elections ==
At the meeting of the City Council on 9 November 1945 the terms of office of twenty of the forty Aldermen expired and the councilors (but not the sitting aldermen) elected twenty Aldermen to fill the vacant positions for a term of six years.

- Alderman re-elected

Party	Alderman
Conservative	Thomas Henry Burton *
Conservative	John Case *
Labour	Joseph Jackson Cleary *
Conservative	Alexander Critchley *
Conservative	Harold Edward Davies *
Conservative	Thomas Dowd *
Labour	Patrick Fay *
Conservative	Mabel Fletcher *
Conservative	Robert Duncan French *
Labour	Alexander Griffin *
Labour	Bertie Victor Kirby M.P.
Conservative	Walter Thomas Lancashire *
Conservative	Alfred Levy *
Labour	David Gilbert Logan M.P.
Protestant	Rev. Harry Dixon Longbottom *
Conservative	George Miller Platt *
Conservative	James Graham Reece *
Labour	William Albert Robinson *
Conservative	George Alfred Srong *
Conservative	Gertrude Elizabeth Wilson *

== By-elections ==
=== Netherfield, 29 January 1946 ===
Caused by the resignation of Councillor William Matthew Clark (Labour, Netherfield, elected 1 November 1938).

Netherfield
Party	Candidate	Votes	%	±%
Protestant	William George Jones	1,302	53%	
Labour	William James Riddick	1,144	47%	
Majority		158		
Registered electors		10,653		
Turnout		2,446	23%	
Protestant hold		Swing		

=== Dingle 19 February 1946 ===
Caused by the death of Councillor George William Gillespie (Conservative, Dingle, elected 1 November 1937).

Dingle
Party	Candidate	Votes	%	±%
Conservative	George Horrace Duckett	3,546	54%	
Labour	William Basil Cashin	3,004	46%	
Majority		542		
Registered electors		17,363		
Turnout		6,550	38%	
Conservative gain from Labour		Swing		

=== Breckfield, 9 May 1946 ===
Alderman Thomas Dowd died on 19 March 1946.

Councillor Ada Martha Burton (Conservative, elected for the Breckfield ward 1 November 1938) was elected by the councillors as an alderman on 3 April 1946 to fill this vacancy.

Breckfield
Party	Candidate	Votes	%	±%
	Thomas Henry Thompson	2,539	61%	
	George Henry Dunbar	1,630	39%	
Majority		909		
Registered electors		12,201		
Turnout		4,169	34%	

=== Aigburth, 16 May 1946 ===
Caused by the resignation of Councillor William Edward Stirling Napier (Conservative, Aigburth, elected 1 November 1937).

Aigburth
Party	Candidate	Votes	%	±%
	Richard Martin Bingham	5,036	73%	
	Victor Harold Edgar Baker	1,255	18%	
	Edmund Booth	619	9%	
Majority		3,781		
Registered electors		16,061		
Turnout		6,910	43%	

=== South Scotland ===
Alderman Patrick Fay died on 16 April 1946.

Councilor Joseph Harrington (Labour, South Scotland, elected 1 November 1937) was elected by the councillors as an alderman to fill this vacancy.

=== Childwall ===
Councillor Stanley Foster (Conservative, Childwall, elected 1 November 1937) died on 18 May 1946.
