= 1949 Liverpool City Council election =

1949 UK local election

← 1947	12 May 1949	1950 →
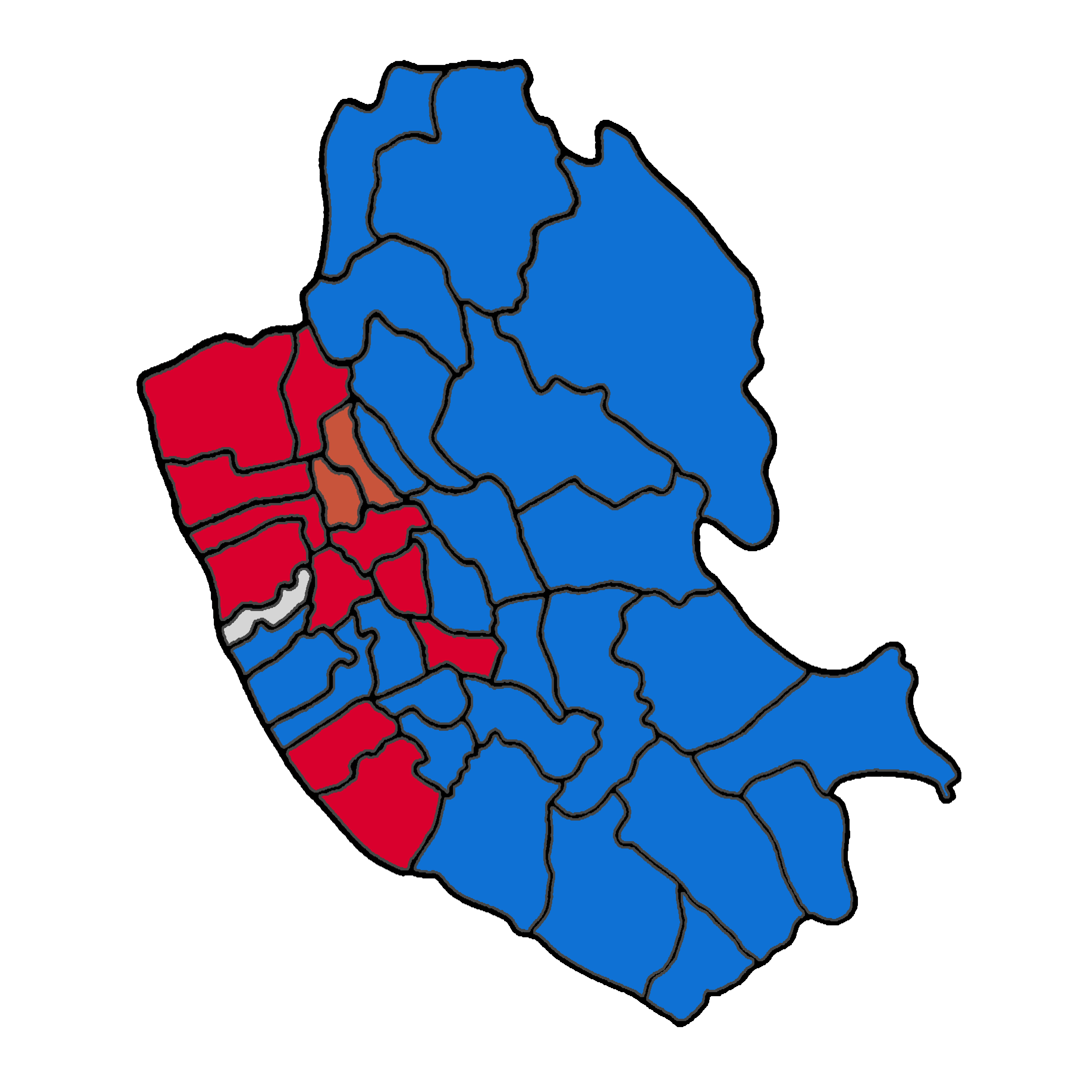
- Map of Liverpool showing wards won (first placed party)

Elections to Liverpool City Council were held on Thursday 12 May 1949.

After the election, the composition of the council was:

Party	Councillors	±	Aldermen	Total
Conservative	77	+14	26	103
Labour	34	-10	8	42
Protestant	5	0	1	6
Liberal	1	0	2	3
Independent	3	-1	2	5

== Election result ==
Liverpool local election result 1949
Party	Seats	Gains	Losses	Net gain/loss	Seats %	Votes %	Votes	+/−
Conservative	28					54%	131,161	
Labour	12					46%	111,233	
Protestant	2					2.3%	5,549	
Liberal	0	0	0	0	0%	0.68%	1,654	
Independent	1	0	0	1		0.33%	795	
Communist	0	0	0	0	0%	0.31%	748	

== Ward results ==
* - Councillor seeking re-election

This was the first May local election following the move from November. Councillors standing for re-election at this election were previously elected in 1945. Therefore, comparisons are made with the 1945 election results.

=== Abercromby ===
Abercromby
Party	Candidate	Votes	%	±%
Conservative	John Kenneth Hart	2,954	54%	+10%
Labour	Francis Lavery *	2,299	42%	−14%
Communist	Mrs. Olwyn White	210	4%	
Majority		655		
Registered electors		14,366		
Turnout		5,463	38%	+3%
Conservative gain from Labour		Swing	+10%	

=== Aigburth ===
Aigburth
Party	Candidate	Votes	%	±%
Conservative	William Alexander Kinnear ^{(PARTY)}	6,867	76%	+16%
Liberal	William Edward Oates	1,117	12%	+1%
Labour	Terence Roberts	1,013	11%	−9%
Majority		5,750		
Registered electors		16,154		
Turnout		8,997	56%	+9%
Conservative hold		Swing	+16%	

=== Allerton ===
Allerton
Party	Candidate	Votes	%	±%
Conservative	Charles Haswell *	3,454	70%	+18%
Labour	Mrs. Edith Evans	916	19%	−11%
Liberal	Herbert Griffith Edwards	537	11%	−6%
Majority		2,538		
Registered electors		9,784		
Turnout		4,907	50%	+4%
Conservative hold		Swing	+18%	

=== Anfield ===
Anfield
Party	Candidate	Votes	%	±%
Conservative	Aled Owen Roberts *	5,543	65%	+9%
Labour	Mrs. Ethel May Wormald	3,011	35%	−9%
Majority		2,532		
Registered electors		17,169		
Turnout		8,554	50%	+9%
Conservative hold		Swing	+9%	

=== Breckfield ===
Breckfield
Party	Candidate	Votes	%	±%
Conservative	Thomas Henry Thompson ^{(PARTY)}	3,433	58%	+7%
Labour	John Hamilton	2,454	42%	−7%
Majority		979		
Registered electors		13,164		
Turnout		5,887	45%	+4%
Conservative hold		Swing	-7%	

=== Brunswick ===
Brunswick
Party	Candidate	Votes	%	±%
Labour	Hugh Carr ^{(PARTY)}	2,938	80%	
Conservative	Mrs. Marion Browne	717	19%	
Communist	John James Downey	39	1.1%	
Majority		2,221		
Registered electors		7,468		
Turnout		3,694	49%	
Labour hold		Swing		

=== Castle Street ===
Castle Street
Party	Candidate	Votes	%	±%
Conservative	William Sinclair Scott ^{(PARTY)}	unopposed		
Conservative gain from Liberal		Swing		

=== Childwall ===
Childwall
Party	Candidate	Votes	%	±%
Conservative	William John Matthew Clark *	unopposed		
Conservative hold		Swing		

=== Croxteth ===
Croxteth
Party	Candidate	Votes	%	±%
Conservative	Francis Henry Wilson	6,993	49%	
Labour	James Cullen *	6,945	49%	−33%
Communist	Dennis Ellwand	183	1.3%	
Ind. Conservative	James Charles Pollard	112	0.79%	−17%
Majority		48		
Registered electors		33,908		
Turnout		14,233	42%	+20%
Conservative gain from Labour		Swing		

=== Dingle ===
Dingle
Party	Candidate	Votes	%	±%
Labour	William Firman Aldis ^{(PARTY)}	4,931	50%	−3%
Conservative	George Horace Duckett	4,844	50%	+3%
Majority		87		
Registered electors		18,076		
Turnout		9,775	54%	+11%
Labour hold		Swing	-1%	

=== Edge Hill ===
Edge Hill
Party	Candidate	Votes	%	±%
Labour	James Johnstone *	3,261	56%	−8%
Conservative	Hugh Maule Jones	2,574	44%	+8%
Majority		687		
Registered electors		13,537		
Turnout		5,835	43%	+5%
Labour hold		Swing	-8%	

=== Everton ===
Everton
Party	Candidate	Votes	%	±%
Labour	John Leslie Hughes *	3,453	62%	
Conservative	William Richard Doherty	2,088	38%	
Majority		1,365		
Registered electors		13,678		
Turnout		5,541	41%	
Labour hold		Swing		

=== Exchange ===
Exchange
Party	Candidate	Votes	%	±%
Independent	Leo Henry Wright *	795	81%	+7%
Labour	Joseph Mooney	190	19%	−7%
Majority		605		
Registered electors		1,625		
Turnout		985	61%	0%
Independent hold		Swing	+7%	

=== Fairfield ===
Fairfield
Party	Candidate	Votes	%	±%
Conservative	Aubrey Brendon Moore ^{(PARTY)}	4,784	58%	+14%
Labour	Victor Henry Cove	3,435	42%	−4%
Majority		1,349		
Registered electors		15,860		
Turnout		8,219	52%	+4%
Conservative hold		Swing	+14%	

=== Fazakerley ===
Fazakerley
Party	Candidate	Votes	%	±%
Conservative	Ralph Rattray	5,213	50%	+3%
Labour	Joseph Morgan *	5,206	50%	−13%
Majority		7		
Registered electors		20,099		
Turnout		10,419	52%	+16%
Conservative gain from Labour		Swing	+3%	

=== Garston ===
Garston
Party	Candidate	Votes	%	±%
Conservative	Kenneth Alexander McCulloch	4,222	51%	+18%
Labour	Alfred Demain *	3,900	47%	−19%
Communist	Isaac Brickwood Pick	144	1.7%	
Majority		322		
Registered electors		17,317		
Turnout		8,266	48%	+8%
Conservative gain from Labour		Swing	+18%	

=== Granby ===
Granby
Party	Candidate	Votes	%	±%
Conservative	William Granville Heald	2,893	52%	+5%
Labour	Mrs. Elizabeth Trainor *	2,657	48%	−5%
Majority		236		
Registered electors		13,347		
Turnout		5,550	42%	−7%
Conservative hold		Swing	+5%	

=== Great George ===
Great George
Party	Candidate	Votes	%	±%
Conservative	Walter John Smith ^{(PARTY)}	823	52%	
Labour	William Tipping	761	48%	
Majority		62		
Registered electors		3,717		
Turnout		1,584	43%	
Conservative gain from Labour		Swing		

=== Kensington ===
Kensington
Party	Candidate	Votes	%	±%
Conservative	Leslie John Henry Rumsey	3,898	54%	+5%
Labour	John Matthew Taylor *	3,352	46%	−5%
Majority		546		
Registered electors		14,425		
Turnout		7,250	50%	+9%
Conservative hold		Swing	+5%	

=== Kirkdale ===
Kirkdale
Party	Candidate	Votes	%	±%
Labour	Peter James O'Hare ^{(PARTY)}	4,883	53%	−7%
Conservative	John Shaw Brown	4,334	47%	+7%
Majority		549		
Registered electors		19,470		
Turnout		9,217	47%	+8%
Labour hold		Swing	-7%	

=== Little Woolton ===
Little Woolton - 2 seats
Party	Candidate	Votes	%	±%
Conservative	Eric Cuthbert Arden ^{(PARTY)}	1,268	63%	−5%
Conservative	Mrs. Phyllis Josephine Cundy	1,267	63%	−5%
Labour	Roy Stoddart	730	37%	+24%
Labour	Howell James	691	35%	+22%
Majority		538		
Registered electors		2,983		
Turnout		1,998	67%	−5%
Conservative hold		Swing	-5%	
Conservative hold		Swing	-5%	

=== Low Hill ===
Low Hill
Party	Candidate	Votes	%	±%
Labour	Fred Robinson *	2,733	51%	−4%
Conservative	William Henry Brook	2,636	49%	+4%
Majority		97		
Registered electors		12,289		
Turnout		5,369	44%	−3%
Labour hold		Swing	-4%	

=== Much Woolton ===
Much Woolton
Party	Candidate	Votes	%	±%
Conservative	Reginald William Stewart *	2,261	78%	+19%
Labour	Noel Arthur Pinches	646	22%	−19%
Majority		1,615		
Registered electors		5,547		
Turnout		2,907	52%	−1%
Conservative hold		Swing	+19%	

=== Netherfield ===
Netherfield
Party	Candidate	Votes	%	±%
Protestant	William George Jones ^{(PARTY)}	2,394	59%	+8%
Labour	Thomas Robinson	1,627	40%	−9%
Communist	Sidney Foster	49	1%	+1%
Majority		767		
Registered electors		10,341		
Turnout		4,070	39%	+9%
Protestant hold		Swing	+8%	

=== North Scotland ===
North Scotland
Party	Candidate	Votes	%	±%
Labour	Herbert Francis Granby *	2,714	98%	+35%
Communist	John William Coward	43	2%	−35%
Majority		2,671		
Registered electors		7,276		
Turnout		2,757	38%	−1%
Labour hold		Swing	+35%	

=== Old Swan ===
Old Swan
Party	Candidate	Votes	%	±%
Conservative	Leslie Hebron Sanders	8,459	65%	+18%
Labour	Frederick Walker ^{(PARTY)}	4,369	34%	−19%
Communist	Miss Winifred May George	187	1.4%	
Majority		4,090		
Registered electors		27,970		
Turnout		13,015	47%	+8%
Conservative gain from Labour		Swing	+18%	

=== Prince's Park ===
Prince's Park
Party	Candidate	Votes	%	±%
Conservative	James Burrows Noble	2,962	55%	+9%
Labour	Mrs. Sarah Ann Demain *	2,429	45%	−9%
Majority		533		
Registered electors		12,276		
Turnout		5,391	44%	+5%
Conservative gain from Labour		Swing	+9%	

=== Sandhills ===
Sandhills - 2 seats
Party	Candidate	Votes	%	±%
Labour	Peter McKernan	3,110	75%	
Labour	Henry Alldritt *	2,873	70%	
Conservative	Joseph Norton	1,011	25%	
Conservative	Frederick Charles Hitches	949	23%	
Majority		2,099		
Registered electors		8,024		
Turnout		4,121	51%	
Labour hold		Swing		
Labour hold		Swing		

=== St. Anne's ===
St. Anne's
Party	Candidate	Votes	%	±%
Labour	Mrs Margaret Elizabeth Braddock *	1,652	57%	
Conservative	Mrs. Catherine Frances Wright	1,238	43%	
Majority		414		
Registered electors		6,205		
Turnout		2,890	47%	
Labour hold		Swing		

=== St. Domingo ===
St. Domingo
Party	Candidate	Votes	%	±%
Protestant	Albert Victor Harris *	3,155	58%	+3%
Labour	Walter Richard Maylor	2,256	42%	−3%
Majority		899		
Registered electors		13,401		
Turnout		5,411	40%	+4%
Protestant hold		Swing	+3%	

=== St. Peter's ===
St. Peter's
Party	Candidate	Votes	%	±%
Conservative	Leo Joseph Gerard Wilkinson ^{(PARTY)}	398	60%	−12%
Labour	Harry Livermore	265	40%	+14%
Majority		133		
Registered electors		1,306		
Turnout		663	51%	−2%
Conservative hold		Swing	-12%	

=== Sefton Park East ===
Sefton Park East
Party	Candidate	Votes	%	±%
Conservative	Charles Enfield Booth ^{(PARTY)}	4,536	73%	+7%
Labour	Thomas Nicholas Moran	1,636	27%	−7%
Majority		2,900		
Registered electors		14,672		
Turnout		6,172	42%	+5%
Conservative hold		Swing	+7%	

=== Sefton Park West ===
Sefton Park West
Party	Candidate	Votes	%	±%
Conservative	Arthur Brierley Collins *	4,364	73%	+7%
Labour	Richard John Alcock	1,611	27%	−7%
Majority		2,753		
Registered electors		11,138		
Turnout		5,975	54%	+9%
Conservative hold		Swing	+7%	

=== South Scotland ===
South Scotland
Party	Candidate	Votes	%	±%
Labour	Michael John Reppion *	2,940	97%	
Communist	Dr. Cyril Taylor	103	3.4%	
Majority		2,940		
Registered electors		6,183		
Turnout		3,043	49%	
Labour hold		Swing		

=== Vauxhall ===
Vauxhall
Party	Candidate	Votes	%	±%
Labour	Thomas Hogan *	823	67%	
Conservative	Mrs. Edna Frances Mary Felton	399	33%	
Majority		424		
Registered electors				
Turnout		1,222		
Labour hold		Swing		

=== Walton ===
Walton
Party	Candidate	Votes	%	±%
Conservative	Richard Edward Searle *	6,157	55%	+7%
Labour	William Smith Wright	5,946	45%	−1%
Majority		1,111		
Registered electors				
Turnout		11,203		
Conservative hold		Swing	+7%	

=== Warbreck ===
Warbreck
Party	Candidate	Votes	%	±%
Conservative	Frank Woolfenden ^{(PARTY)}	5,982	67%	+18%
Labour	Isidore Levin	2,919	33%	+1%
Majority		3,063		
Registered electors				
Turnout		8,901		
Conservative hold		Swing		

=== Wavertree ===
Wavertree - 2 seats
Party	Candidate	Votes	%	±%
Conservative	Miss Eleanor Bingham Harrison	8,068	71%	+13%
Conservative	Harold Threlfall Wilson	7,559	66%	+8%
Labour	Francis Burke	3,346	29%	−13%
Labour	John Stuart Keys	3,137	27%	−15%
Majority		4,722		
Registered electors				
Turnout		11,414		
Conservative hold		Swing		
Conservative hold		Swing		

=== Wavertree West ===
Wavertree West
Party	Candidate	Votes	%	±%
Conservative	Samuel Curtis	3,420	53%	
Labour	Charles James Minton *	3,045	47%	
Majority		375		
Registered electors				
Turnout		6,465		
Conservative gain from Labour		Swing		

=== West Derby ===
West Derby
Party	Candidate	Votes	%	±%
Conservative	Robert Cyril Beattie *	10,152	67%	+8%
Labour	Edward William Harby	5,030	33%	−9%
Majority		5,122		
Registered electors				
Turnout		15,182		
Conservative hold		Swing		

== Aldermanic elections ==
=== Aldermanic elections 23 May 1949 ===
At the meeting of the City Council on 23 May 1949 the terms of office of twenty of the forty Aldermen expired and the Council elected twenty Aldermen to fill the vacant positions for a term of six years.

Party	Alderman
Conservative	William John Matthew Clark
Conservative	Ernest Ash Cookson*
Conservative	Vere Egerton Cotton*
Conservative	James Conrad Cross*
Conservative	Michael Cory Dixon*
Liberal	Mary Mabel Eills*
Independent	James Farrell*
Conservative	Charles Gordon Snowden Gordon*
Conservative	Moss Greenberg*
Conservative	William Greenough Gregson*
Conservative	Robert John Hall*
Labour	Luke Hogan*
Independent	Peter Kavanagh*
Labour	Lawrence King*
Conservative	Albert Morrow*
Conservative	William Thomas Roberts*
Conservative	Alfred Ernest Shennan*
Conservative	Edwin Thompson*
Liberal	William John Tristram*
Conservative	Joseph Williams*

- * Reelected Aldermen

== By-elections ==
=== Childwall, 15 September 1949 ===
Caused by the election of Cllr. William John Matthew Clark as an Alderman on 23 May 1949

Anfield
Party	Candidate	Votes	%	±%
	John Shaw Brown	4,204		
	Roy Stoddart	1,046		
	Herbert Ashley Ruddlesden	809		
Majority				
Registered electors				
Turnout				
		Swing		

=== Anfield 10 November 1949 ===
Caused by the death of Cllr. Aled Owen Roberts

Anfield
Party	Candidate	Votes	%	±%
	Peter Marcus Edis	4,542		
	John Richard Jones			
	Walter Richard Maylor			
Majority				
Registered electors				
Turnout				
	Conservative hold	Swing		

Alderman William Albert Robinson died on 31 December 1949 His position was filled by Cllr. Michael John Reppion (Labour, elected for the South Scotland ward in May 1949), who was elected as an Alderman by the Council on 1 February 1950 and was assigned as the Returning Officer for the Everton ward.

Alderman Peter Kavanagh died on 19 February 1950 His position was filled by Cllr. Stanley Robert Williams (Conservative, elected for the Wavertree ward on 1 November 1947), who was elected as an Alderman by the City Council on 5 April 1950 and assigned as Returning Officer for the Vauxhall ward.

Alderman Gertrude Elizabeth Wilson died on 23 February 1950.

Her position was filled by Cllr. George Webster Green Armour (Conservative, elected for the Sefton Park East ward in November 1946) was elected as an Alderman by the City Council on 5 April 1950 and assigned as Returning Officer for the Dingle ward.
