= 1932 Liverpool City Council election =

1932 English local government election

- 1 November 1932

39 councillors' seats were up for election

Elections to Liverpool City Council were held on 1 November 1932. One third of the council seats were up for election, the term of office of each councillor being three years.

Six of the forty seats up for election were uncontested.

After the election, the composition of the council was:

Party	Councillors	±	Aldermen	Total
Conservative	??	+1	??	??
Labour	??	-3	??	??
Liberal	??	0	??	??
Independent	??	+1	??	??
Centre	??	0	??	??
Protestant	??	+1	??	??

== Election result ==
Liverpool local election result 1932
Party	Seats	Gains	Losses	Net gain/loss	Seats %	Votes %	Votes	+/−
Conservative	16	4	3	-1	41%			
Labour	16	1	4	-3	41%			
Liberal	2	0	0	0	5%			
Independent	2	1	0	+1	5%			
Centre	1	0	0	9	3%			
Protestant	1	1	0	+1	3%			
Communist	0	0	0	0	0%			

== Ward results ==
* - Councillor seeking re-election

Comparisons are made with the 1929 election results.

=== Abercromby ===
No. 9 Abercromby
Party	Candidate	Votes	%	±%
Conservative	Charles William Bailey	1,821	57%	
Labour	Mrs. Agnes Mitton	1,231	39%	
Youth	Lawrence Joseph Patrick McAdam	139	4%	
Majority		590		
Registered electors		9,444		
Turnout		3,191	34%	
Conservative hold		Swing		

=== Aigburth ===
No. 17 Aigburth
Party	Candidate	Votes	%	±%
Conservative	Vere Egerton Cotton O.B.E.	1,974	60%	
Liberal	Arthur Donald Dennis	1,293	40%	
Majority		681		
Registered electors		8,819		
Turnout		3,267	37%	
Conservative hold		Swing		

=== Allerton ===
No. 35 Allerton
Party	Candidate	Votes	%	±%
Conservative	John William Jones	unopposed		
Registered electors				
Conservative hold		Swing		

=== Anfield ===
No. 29 Anfield
Party	Candidate	Votes	%	±%
Liberal	Alfred Gates *	2,989	74%	
	Frederick Jones	1,024	26%	
Majority		1,965		
Registered electors				
Turnout				
Liberal hold		Swing		

=== Breckfield ===
No. 30 Breckfield
Party	Candidate	Votes	%	±%
Conservative	Mrs. Ada Martha Burton	2,134	53%	
Labour	Alfred Hargreaves	1,910	47%	
Majority		224		
Registered electors		10,450		
Turnout		4,044	39%	
Conservative gain from Labour		Swing		

=== Brunswick ===
No. 11 Brunswick
Party	Candidate	Votes	%	±%
Labour	Lawrence King *	3,912	95%	
Communist	Frederick William Gibson	212	5%	
Majority		3,700		
Registered electors		8,843		
Turnout		4,124	47%	
Labour hold		Swing		

=== Castle Street ===
No. 7 Castle Street
Party	Candidate	Votes	%	±%
Conservative	Robert Garnett Sheldon *	unopposed		
Registered electors				
Conservative hold		Swing		

=== Childwall ===
No. 38 Childwall
Party	Candidate	Votes	%	±%
Conservative	Lady Helena Agnes Dalrymple Muspratt *	978	48%	
Liberal	William John Tristram	849	42%	
Labour	Alfred Donohue	195	10%	
Majority		129		
Registered electors		3,299		
Turnout		2,022	61%	
Conservative hold		Swing		

=== Croxteth ===
No. 40 Croxteth
Party	Candidate	Votes	%	±%
Labour	George Henry Boothman *	3,397	55%	
Conservative	John Moores	2,442	39%	
Democratic Labour	Peter Joseph Haines	221	4%	
Communist	Charles William Heaton	118	2%	
Majority		975		
Registered electors		12,936		
Turnout		6,158	48%	
Labour hold		Swing		

=== Dingle ===
No. 12 Dingle
Party	Candidate	Votes	%	±%
Labour	William Jones *	4,478	50%	
Conservative	James Bennett O.B.E.	3,084	35%	
Protestant	Richard Bradley	1,362	15%	
Majority		1,394		
Registered electors		15,518		
Turnout		8,924	58%	
Labour hold		Swing		

=== Edge Hill ===
No. 18 Edge Hill
Party	Candidate	Votes	%	±%
Labour	Alexander Griffin *	3,402	60%	
Conservative	William Murphy	2,018	36%	
Ind. Labour Party	John Fitzpatrick Hughes	246	4%	
Majority		1,384		
Registered electors		13,318		
Turnout		5,666	43%	
Labour hold		Swing		

=== Everton ===
No. 21 Everton
Party	Candidate	Votes	%	±%
Labour	John Braddock	4,408	65%	
Conservative	John Harold Irwin	2,383	35%	
Majority		2,025		
Registered electors		13,436		
Turnout		6,791	51%	
Labour hold		Swing		

=== Exchange ===
No. 5 Exchange
Party	Candidate	Votes	%	±%
Centre	Miss Alice McCormick *	717	68%	
Labour	Albert Smitton	258	25%	
Youth	Arthur James Gerard Smyth	69	6.6%	
Ind. Labour Party	Mark Edward Boggin	7	0.67%	
Majority		459		
Registered electors				
Turnout		1,051		
Centre hold		Swing		

=== Fairfield ===
No. 31 Fairfield
Party	Candidate	Votes	%	±%
Conservative	John Barry *	2,557	65%	
Labour	Richard Thomas Hughes	1,350	35%	
Majority		1,207		
Registered electors		10,309		
Turnout		3,907	38%	
Conservative hold		Swing		

=== Fazakerley ===
No. 27 Fazakerley
Party	Candidate	Votes	%	±%
Conservative	Richard Disley	2,413	52%	
Labour	Francis Lavery	1,261	27%	
Ind. Labour Party	Robert Edwards *	943	20%	
Majority		1,152		
Registered electors		11,026		
Turnout		4,617	42%	
Conservative gain from Labour		Swing		

=== Garston ===
No. 37 Garston
Party	Candidate	Votes	%	±%
Labour	William Sydney Dytor	2,558	59%	
Conservative	John Case *	1,808	41%	
Majority		750		
Registered electors		7,695		
Turnout		4,366	57%	
Labour gain from Conservative		Swing		

=== Granby ===
No. 14 Granby
Party	Candidate	Votes	%	±%
Independent	Miss Eleanor Florence Rathbone MP *	Unopposed	N/A	N/A
Registered electors				
Independent hold				

=== Great George ===
No. 10 Great George
Party	Candidate	Votes	%	±%
Labour	Percy Ernest Sherwin	951	49%	
Democratic Labour	Matthew Grogan *	933	48%	
Youth	Leo Patrick Taylor	64	3%	
Majority		18		
Registered electors		5,048		
Turnout		1,948	39%	
Labour hold		Swing		

=== Kensington ===
No. 19 Kensington
Party	Candidate	Votes	%	±%
Conservative	Edward Clouston Ralph Litler-Jones	2,479	52%	
Labour	Bernard Louis Meyer	1,944	41%	
Liberal	William Henry Ledsom	323	7%	
Majority		535		
Registered electors		11,270		
Turnout		4,746	42%	
Conservative gain from Labour		Swing		

=== Kirkdale ===
No. 24 Kirkdale
Party	Candidate	Votes	%	±%
Labour	William Henry Barton *	2,546	35%	
Conservative	Ernest Tyrer	2,471	34%	
Protestant	William Reuben Price	1,771	24%	
Ind. Labour Party	Charles Henry Cund junr.	536	7.2%	
Communist	Albert Edward Cole	125	1.7%	
Majority		75		
Registered electors		17,097		
Turnout		7,449	44%	
Labour hold		Swing		

=== Little Woolton ===
No election.

=== Low Hill ===
No. 20 Low Hill
Party	Candidate	Votes	%	±%
Labour	Fred Robinson	2,520	54%	
Conservative	Gwilym Eiriol Mills	2,053	44%	
Communist	John Frederick Hedley	103	2.2%	
Majority		467		
Registered electors		11,316		
Turnout		4,676	41%	
Labour hold		Swing		

=== Much Woolton ===
No. 36 Much Woolton
Party	Candidate	Votes	%	±%
Independent	Mrs. Caroline Whiteley	850	52%	
Conservative	Edwin Phillips Thompson	740	45%	
Labour	Arthur Lumb	52	3.2%	
Independent Democratic Labour	Patrick O'Brien Hendley	7	3.2%	
Majority		110		
Registered electors		2,371		
Turnout		1,649	70%	
Independent gain from Conservative		Swing		

=== Netherfield ===
No. 22 Netherfield
Party	Candidate	Votes	%	±%
Labour	George Chadwick *	3,079	47%	
Conservative	Arnold Barkby	1,980	30%	
Protestant	Albert Clayton	1,490	23%	
Majority		1,090		
Registered electors		12,078		
Turnout		6,549	54%	
Labour hold		Swing		

=== North Scotland ===
No. 2 North Scotland
Party	Candidate	Votes	%	±%
Labour	Mrs. Margaret Macfarlane	2,429	92%	
Communist	Leo Joseph McGree	206	7.8%	
Majority		2,223		
Registered electors				
Turnout		2,635		
Labour hold		Swing		

=== Old Swan ===
No. 32 Old Swan
Party	Candidate	Votes	%	±%
Labour	Thomas Williamson *	3,659	52%	
Conservative	George Charles Edward Simpson O.B.E.	3,440	48%	
Majority		219		
Registered electors		16,191		
Turnout		7,099	44%	
Labour hold		Swing		

=== Prince's Park ===
No. 13 Prince's Park
Party	Candidate	Votes	%	±%
Conservative	Charles Roland Clare	2,448	55%	
Labour	Alfred Demain	2,029	45%	
Majority		419		
Registered electors		16,191		
Turnout		4,477	28%	
Conservative hold		Swing		

=== Sandhills ===
No. 1 Sandhills
Party	Candidate	Votes	%	±%
Labour	James William Baker *	2,903	94%	
Communist	Ieuan Peters Hughes	198	6%	
Majority		2,705		
Registered electors		9,369		
Turnout		3,101	33%	
Labour hold		Swing		

=== St. Anne's ===
No. 6 St. Anne's
Party	Candidate	Votes	%	±%
Labour	Samuel Sydney Silverman	3,227	86%	
Democratic Labour	Thomas Conifer	505	13%	
Majority		2,722		
Registered electors		9,108		
Turnout		3,732	41%	
Labour hold		Swing		

=== St. Domingo ===
No. 23 St. Domingo
Party	Candidate	Votes	%	±%
Protestant	Mrs. Mary Jane Longbottom	1,784	35%	
Conservative	William Edward Backhouse *	1,566	30%	
Labour	Robert Joseph McDonnell	1,370	27%	
Ind. Labour Party	George Edward Humphreys	432	8%	
Majority		218		
Registered electors		11,712		
Turnout		5,152	44%	
Protestant gain from Conservative		Swing		

=== St. Peter's ===
No. 8 St. Peter's
Party	Candidate	Votes	%	±%
Liberal	Arthur Robinson	671	52%	
Labour	Robert Edward Cottier	488	38%	
Independent	William Edward McLachlan	130	10%	
Majority		183		
Registered electors		2,853		
Turnout		1,289	45%	
Liberal hold		Swing		

=== Sefton Park East ===
No. 15 Sefton Park East
Party	Candidate	Votes	%	±%
Conservative	Michael Cory Dixon *	unopposed		
Registered electors				
Conservative hold		Swing		

=== Sefton Park West ===
No. 16 Sefton Park West
Party	Candidate	Votes	%	±%
Conservative	Ronald Percy Clayton *	unopposed		
Registered electors				
Conservative hold		Swing		

=== South Scotland ===
No. 3 South Scotland
Party	Candidate	Votes	%	±%
Labour	John Sheehan	unopposed		
Registered electors				
Labour hold		Swing		

=== Vauxhall ===
No. 4 Vauxhall
Party	Candidate	Votes	%	±%
Labour	Arthur Brian Hoer	953	55%	
Democratic Labour	Stephen McBride	779	45%	
Majority		174		
Registered electors		3,704		
Turnout		1,732	47%	
Labour hold		Swing		

=== Walton ===
No. 25 Walton
Party	Candidate	Votes	%	±%
Conservative	George Miller Platt *	3,581	58%	
Labour	William James Riddick	2,614	42%	
Majority		967		
Registered electors		16,370		
Turnout		6,195	38%	
Conservative hold		Swing		

=== Warbreck ===
No. 26 Warbreck
Party	Candidate	Votes	%	±%
Conservative	James Jude *	2,847	66%	
Labour	William Bent	1,460	34%	
Majority		1,387		
Registered electors		12,459		
Turnout		4,307	35%	
Conservative hold		Swing		

=== Wavertree ===
No. 34 Wavertree
Party	Candidate	Votes	%	±%
Conservative	Frederick Redmond	3,583	68%	
Labour	John Reginald Bevins	1,701	32%	
Majority		1,882	36%	
Registered electors		14,857		
Turnout		5,284	36%	
Conservative hold		Swing		

=== Wavertree West ===
No. 33 Wavertree West
Party	Candidate	Votes	%	±%
Conservative	Charlton Thomson	2,141	53%	
Labour	Charles Matthew Belk	1,000	25%	
Independent	Mrs. Caroline Whiteley	929	23%	
Majority		1,141		
Registered electors		13,898		
Turnout		4,070	29%	
Conservative gain from Labour		Swing		

=== West Derby ===
No. 28 West Derby
Party	Candidate	Votes	%	±%
Conservative	Albert Morrow *	4,176	64%	
Labour	John Hamilton	2,322	36%	
Majority		1,854		
Registered electors		18,628		
Turnout		6,498	35%	
Conservative hold		Swing		

== Aldermanic elections ==
=== Aldermanic Election 9 November 1932 ===
19 Aldermen were elected by the councillors on 9 November 1932 for a term of six years.

* - re-elected alderman.

Party	Name	Votes	
Conservative	Robert Lowry Burns J.P. *	77	
Conservative	Henry Alexander Cole J.P. *	77	
Conservative	Sir Max Muspratt Bart. *	77	
Conservative	Edward Russell-Taylor J.P. *	77	
Conservative	Councillor Robert Garnett Sheldon	77	
Conservative	Edwin Thompson J.P. *	77	
Conservative	Sir Thomas White *	77	
Conservative	James Conrad Cross J.P. *	76	
Liberal	Burton William Eills J.P.	76	
Liberal	John Lamport Eills J.P. *	76	
Conservative	William Wallace Kelly J.P. *	76	
Liberal	Richard Robert Meade-King J.P. *	76	
Conservative	Anthony Shelmerdine J.P. *	76	
Liberal	Frederick Smith J.P. *	76	
Independent	Austin Harford J.P. *	75	
Independent	James Bolger *	74	
Labour	Thomas Burke J.P. *	74	
Labour	Luke Hogan M.B.E. J.P. *	24	
Independent	Patrick Jeremiah Kelly *	24	
Conservative	Councillor Wilfrid Bowring Stoddart	1	not elected

=== Aldermanic Election ===
Alderman Joseph Dalton Flood died on 29 October 1932

=== Aldermanic Election 1 February 1933 ===
Caused by the death on 22 November 1932 of Alderman Joseph Ashworth (Conservative, last elected as an alderman on 9 November 1929), Councillor George Miller Platt (Conservative, Walton elected 1 November 1932), Builder and Contractor of "The Gables", Moss Delph Lane, Aughton, was elected as an alderman by the council on 1 February 1933

Aldermanic Election 6 July 1932
Party	Candidate	Votes	%	Allocated ward
Conservative	Councillor George Miller Platt	57	100%	No. 31 Fairfield

The term of office to expire on 9 November 1935.

== By-elections ==
=== No. 40 Croxteth, Thursday, 3 November 1932 ===
Caused by the disqualification of Councillor Oswald Wade (Conservative, elected to the Croxteth ward on 1 November 1930), due to him being declared bankrupt, which was reported to the council on 5 October 1932 .

No. 40 Croxteth
Party	Candidate	Votes	%	±%
Labour	Mary Lilian Hamilton	3,574	70%	
Conservative	Dinsdale Walker junior	1,556	30%	
Majority		2,018		
Registered electors		12,936		
Turnout		5,130	40%	
Labour hold		Swing		

=== No. 25 Walton, 16 February 1933 ===
Following the death on 22 November 1932 of Alderman Joseph Ashworth (Conservative, last elected as an alderman on 9 November 1929), Councillor George Miller Platt (Conservative, Walton elected 1 November 1932), was elected as an alderman by the council on 1 February 1933.

No. 25 Walton
Party	Candidate	Votes	%	±%
Conservative	John Harold Irwin	2,668	62%	
Labour	William James Riddick	1,564	38%	
Majority		994		
Registered electors		16,370		
Turnout		4,122	25%	
Conservative hold		Swing		

=== No. 7 Castle Street, 29 November 1932 ===
Caused by Councillor Robert Garnett Sheldon (Conservative, last elected as a Councillor on 1 November 1932) being elected as an alderman by the council on 9 November 1932.

No. 7 Castle Street
Party	Candidate	Votes	%	±%
Conservative	James Bennett	unopposed		
Registered electors				
Conservative hold		Swing		

=== No. 19 Kensington, 23 May 1933 ===
Caused by the death on 25 April 1933 of Councillor Joseph Gardner (Conservative, elected 1 November 1931.

No. 19 Kensington
Party	Candidate	Votes	%	±%
Conservative	John Case	1,850	51%	
	George Porter	1,324	36%	
	Alfred David Adams	299	8%	
Liberal	William Henry Ledsom	183	5%	
Majority		526		
Registered electors		11,270		
Turnout		3,656	32%	
Conservative hold		Swing		

=== No. 8 St. Peters, 30 May 1933 ===
Caused by the resignation of Councillor Herbert Wolfe Levy (Conservative, elected 1 November 1931) which was reported to the council on 17 May 1933

No. 8 St. Peter's
Party	Candidate	Votes	%	±%
Conservative	Sydney James Hill	458	53%	
	Joseph Whitehead	340	39%	
	Frederick Bowman	72	8%	
Majority		118		
Registered electors		2,853		
Turnout		870	30%	
		Swing		

=== No.10 Great George, 22 August 1933 ===
Caused by the resignation of Councillor Harry Leo Gaffeney (Democratic Labour, Great George elected 1 November 1931) which was reported to the council on 26 July 1933.

No. 10 Great George
Party	Candidate	Votes	%	±%
Labour	John Hamilton	unopposed		
Registered electors		5,048		
Labour gain from Democratic Labour				

== See also ==
- Liverpool City Council
- Liverpool Town Council elections 1835 - 1879
- Liverpool City Council elections 1880–present
- Mayors and Lord Mayors of Liverpool 1207 to present
- History of local government in England
