= 1920 Liverpool City Council election =

1920 English local government election

- 1 November 1920

38 councillors' seats were up for election (one third): one seat for each of the 40 wards 77 of 114 Councillors and 38 Aldermen seats needed for a majority

Elections to Liverpool City Council were held on 1 November 1920.

One third of the council seats were up for election. The term of office for each councillor being three years.

Nine of the 38 seats were uncontested.

After the election, the composition of the council was:

Party	Councillors	±	Aldermen	Total
Conservative	54	+1	26	80
Liberal	19	-3	6	25
Irish Nationalist	17	+4	3	20
Labour	18	-2	2	20
Independent	3	+1	0	3
Co-operative	??	??	??	??

== Election result ==
Liverpool local election result 1920
Party	Seats	Gains	Losses	Net gain/loss	Seats %	Votes %	Votes	+/−
Conservative								
Liberal								
Irish Nationalist								
Labour								
Independent								
Co-operative Party								

== Ward results ==
* - Retiring Councillor seeking re-election

Comparisons are made with the 19?? election results, as the retiring councillors were elected in 19??.

=== Abercromby ===
No. 9 Abercromby
Party	Candidate	Votes	%	±%
	Francis William Bailey	unopposed		
Registered electors				
		Swing		

=== Aigburth ===
No. 17 Aigburth
Party	Candidate	Votes	%	±%
Liberal	Albert Edward Jacob	Unopposed	N/A	N/A
Registered electors				
Liberal hold				

=== Allerton ===
No. 35 Allerton
Party	Candidate	Votes	%	±%
	Philip Nelson	unopposed		
Registered electors				
	win (new seat)			

=== Anfield ===
No. 29 Anfield
Party	Candidate	Votes	%	±%
Liberal	William Owen Thomas	3,445	75%	
Labour	James Peter Redish	1,149	25%	
Majority		2,296		
Registered electors		8,707		
Turnout		4,594	53%	
Liberal hold		Swing		

=== Breckfield ===
No. 30 Breckfield
Party	Candidate	Votes	%	±%
Conservative	Alfred Griffiths *	3,859	73%	
Labour	Albert Nicholas Denaro	1,398	27%	
Majority		2,461		
Registered electors		9,427		
Turnout		5,257	56%	
Conservative hold		Swing		

=== Brunswick ===
No. 11 Brunswick
Party	Candidate	Votes	%	±%
Irish Nationalist	Lawrence King	unopposed		
Registered electors				
Irish Nationalist hold		Swing		

=== Castle Street ===
No. 7 Castle Street
Party	Candidate	Votes	%	±%
Conservative	Benjamin Cookson	unopposed		
Registered electors				
Conservative hold		Swing		

=== Childwall ===
No. 38 Childwall
Party	Candidate	Votes	%	±%
Liberal	Mrs. Helena Agnes Dalrymple Muspratt	491	66%	
Labour	John Mouat Robertson	250	34%	
Majority		241		
Registered electors		2,207		
Turnout		741	34%	
Liberal win (new seat)				

=== Dingle ===
No. 12 Dingle
Party	Candidate	Votes	%	±%
Conservative	Joseph Dalton Flood *	5,214	75%	
Labour	William McIntosh Wright	1,751	25%	
Majority		3,463		
Registered electors		13,212		
Turnout		6,965	53%	
Conservative hold		Swing		

=== Edge Hill ===
No. 18 Edge Hill
Party	Candidate	Votes	%	±%
Conservative	Daniel Charles Williams	4,333	67%	
Labour	Bernard Louis Myer	2,153	33%	
Majority		2,180		
Registered electors		11,416		
Turnout		6,486	57%	
Conservative hold		Swing		

=== Everton ===
No. 21 Everton
Party	Candidate	Votes	%	±%
Conservative	John Ellis	3,736	56%	
Labour	James Whittaker	2,931	44%	
Majority		805		
Registered electors		11,672		
Turnout		6,667	57%	
Conservative hold		Swing		

=== Exchange ===
No. 5 Exchange
Party	Candidate	Votes	%	±%
Irish Nationalist	Henry Granby	907	52%	
Liberal	Frederick Charles Bowring *	829	48%	
Majority		78		
Registered electors		2,672		
Turnout		1,736	65%	
Irish Nationalist gain from Liberal		Swing		

=== Fairfield ===
No. 31 Fairfield
Party	Candidate	Votes	%	±%
Liberal	James Hughes *	3,455	75%	
Co-operative Party	Edmund Rose	1,154	25%	
Majority		2,301		
Registered electors		8,949		
Turnout		4,609	52%	
Labour hold		Swing		

=== Fazakerley ===
No. 27 Fazakerley
Party	Candidate	Votes	%	±%
Conservative	Matthew Leitch sen.	870	66%	
Labour	John Williams	452	34%	
Majority		418		
Registered electors		2,577		
Turnout		1,322	51%	
Conservative win (new seat)				

=== Garston ===
No. 37 Garston
Party	Candidate	Votes	%	±%
Conservative	Joshua Burrows	2,287	61%	
Labour	William Henry Paulson &	1,468	39%	
Majority		819		
Registered electors		5,187		
Turnout		3,755	72%	
Conservative gain from Labour		Swing		

=== Granby ===
No. 14 Granby
Party	Candidate	Votes	%	±%
Independent	Miss Eleanor Florence Rathbone *	Unopposed	N/A	N/A
Registered electors				
Independent hold				

=== Great George ===
No. 10 Great George
Party	Candidate	Votes	%	±%
Irish Nationalist	William Grogan	1,766	65%	
Liberal	Samuel Skelton *	955	35%	
Majority		811		
Registered electors		3,875		
Turnout		2,721	70%	
Irish Nationalist gain from Liberal		Swing		

=== Kensington ===
No. 19 Kensington
Party	Candidate	Votes	%	±%
Conservative	Joseph Ashworth *	4,174	65%	
Labour	William Burnett Smithwick	2,280	35%	
Majority		1,894		
Registered electors		10,212		
Turnout		6,454	63%	
Conservative hold		Swing		

=== Kirkdale ===
No. 24 Kirkdale
Party	Candidate	Votes	%	±%
Conservative	John George Paris *	5,486	70%	
Labour	Frederick Jones	2,396	30%	
Majority		3,090	40%	
Registered electors		14,288		
Turnout		7,882	55%	
Conservative hold		Swing		

=== Low Hill ===
No. 20 Low Hill
Party	Candidate	Votes	%	±%
Conservative	Richard Henry Mitchell	3,309	61%	
Labour	James Hamblett Johnstone	2,086	39%	
Majority		1,223		
Registered electors		9,454		
Turnout		5,395	57%	
Conservative hold		Swing		

=== Much Woolton ===
No. 36 Much Woolton
Party	Candidate	Votes	%	±%
Conservative	Thomas Harrison	756	63%	
Labour	Charles Jabez Edwards	438	37%	
Majority		318		
Registered electors		1,585		
Turnout		1,194	75%	
Conservative hold		Swing		

=== Netherfield ===
No. 22 Netherfield
Party	Candidate	Votes	%	±%
Conservative	William Ball *	4,042	73%	
Labour	John Archibald Metcalfe	1,481	27%	
Majority		2,561		
Registered electors		10,349		
Turnout		5,523	53%	
Conservative hold		Swing		

=== North Scotland ===
No. 2 North Scotland
Party	Candidate	Votes	%	±%
Irish Nationalist	William John Loughrey	unopposed		
Registered electors				
Irish Nationalist hold		Swing		

=== Old Swan ===
No. 32 Old Swan
Party	Candidate	Votes	%	±%
Conservative	Alfred Ernest Shennan	3,617	69%	
Labour	John Edward Sunners	1,599	31%	
Majority		2,018		
Registered electors		9,945		
Turnout		5,216	52%	
Conservative hold		Swing		

=== Prince's Park ===
No. 13 Prince's Park
Party	Candidate	Votes	%	±%
Conservative	Charles Henry Rutherford *	3,461	76%	
Labour	Thomas Griffiths	1,116	24%	
Majority		2,345		
Registered electors		8,211		
Turnout		4,577	56%	
Conservative hold		Swing		

=== Sandhills ===
No. 1 Sandhills
Party	Candidate	Votes	%	±%
Irish Nationalist	James William Baker	2,780	55%	
Liberal	Alfred Gates *	2,243	45%	
Majority		537		
Registered electors		8,321		
Turnout		1,092	60%	
Irish Nationalist gain from Liberal		Swing		

=== St. Anne's ===
No. 6 St. Anne's
Party	Candidate	Votes	%	±%
Irish Nationalist	Patrick Alfred Durkin	2,563	74%	
Liberal	Dr. James Clement Baxter *	918	26%	
Majority		1,645		
Registered electors		6,977		
Turnout		3,481	50%	
Irish Nationalist gain from Liberal		Swing		

=== St. Domingo ===
No. 23 St. Domingo
Party	Candidate	Votes	%	±%
Conservative	William Edward Backhouse	unopposed		
Registered electors				
Conservative hold		Swing		

=== St. Peter's ===
No. 8 St. Peter's
Party	Candidate	Votes	%	±%
Liberal	Lawrence Durning Holt *	991	91%	
Irish Nationalist	James Friery	101	9%	
Majority		890		
Registered electors		2,607		
Turnout		1,092	42%	
Liberal hold		Swing		

=== Sefton Park East ===
No. 15 Sefton Park East
Party	Candidate	Votes	%	±%
Conservative	Michael Cory Dixon	unopposed		
Registered electors				
Conservative hold		Swing		

=== Sefton Park West ===
No. 16 Sefton Park West
Party	Candidate	Votes	%	±%
Liberal	Frank Campbell Wilson *	2,944	86%	
Labour	Mrs. Julia Gertrude Taylor	460	14%	
Majority		2,484		
Registered electors		5,607		
Turnout		3,404	61%	
Liberal hold		Swing		

=== South Scotland ===
No. 3 South Scotland
Party	Candidate	Votes	%	±%
Irish Nationalist	David Gilbert Logan	2,611	54%	
Labour	Henry Gaskin	2,252	46%	
Majority		359		
Registered electors		8,036		
Turnout		4,863	61%	
Irish Nationalist hold		Swing		

=== Vauxhall ===
No. 4 Vauxhall
Party	Candidate	Votes	%	±%
Irish Nationalist	James O'Hare *	1,234	69%	
Liberal	John Bennion	542	31%	
Majority		692		
Registered electors		3,494		
Turnout		1,776	51%	
Irish Nationalist hold		Swing		

=== Walton ===
No. 25 Walton
Party	Candidate	Votes	%	±%
Conservative	George Miller Platt *	4,296	74%	
Labour	Robert Joseph McDonnell	1,502	26%	
Majority		2,794		
Registered electors		11,661		
Turnout		5,798	50%	
Conservative hold		Swing		

=== Warbreck ===
No. 26 Warbreck
Party	Candidate	Votes	%	±%
Conservative	John Albert Thompson *	3,540	78%	
Co-operative Party	Mrs. Jessie Ann Daniels	982	22%	
Majority		2,558		
Registered electors		10,521		
Turnout		4,552	43%	
Conservative hold		Swing		

=== Wavertree ===
No. 34 Wavertree
Party	Candidate	Votes	%	±%
Conservative	Henry Langton Beckwith *	3,793	68%	
Labour	Robert Tissyman	1,795	32%	
Majority		1,998		
Registered electors		9,456		
Turnout		5,588	59%	
Conservative hold		Swing		

=== Wavertree West ===
No. 33 Wavertree West
Party	Candidate	Votes	%	±%
Conservative	Edwin Haig *	3,303	67%	
Labour	Albert Edward Johns	1,612	33%	
Majority		1,691		
Registered electors		8,040		
Turnout		4,915	61%	
Conservative hold		Swing		

=== West Derby ===
No. 28 West Derby
Party	Candidate	Votes	%	±%
Conservative	Frederick William Riley	3,755	71%	
Labour	Joseph Smith	1,550	29%	
Majority		2,205	42%	
Registered electors		8,923		
Turnout		5,305	59%	
Conservative hold		Swing		

== Aldermanic Elections ==
=== Aldermanic Election 9 November 1920 ===
At the meeting of the council on 9 November 1920, the terms of office of eighteen alderman expired.

The following eighteen were elected as Aldermen by the councillors on 9 November 1920 for a term of six years.

* - re-elected aldermen.

Party	Alderman	Ward
Conservative	Sir John Sutherland Harmood Banner MP *	Breckfield
Conservative	William Boote *	Princes Park
Conservative	Edward James Chevalier JP *	Old Swan
Conservative	Arthur Crosthwaite JP *	Anfield
Liberal	John Lamport Eills JP *	South Scotland
Liberal	Jacob Reuben Grant JP *	Warbreck
Irish Nationalist	Austin Harford *	North Scotland
Conservative	James Heald JP *	Much Woolton
Liberal	Joseph Harrison Jones	Exchange
Liberal	John Lea JP *	St. Domingo
Irish Nationalist	George Jeremy Lynskey *	Vauxhall
Liberal	Richard Robert Meade-King JP *	Sandhills
Conservative	Frederick James Rawlinson JP *	Aigburth
Conservative	Esward Russell-Taylor JP *	Brunswick
Conservative	Sir Archibald Tutton Salvidge KBE *	Abercromby
Conservative	Anthony Shelmerdine JP *	Sefton Park West
Liberal	Frederick Smith JP *	Castle Street
Liberal	William Henry Watts *	St. Anne's

=== Aldermanic Election 2 March 1921 ===
Caused by the death of Alderman William Roberts (Conservative, last elected as an Alderman by the council on 9 November 1913 on 17 January 1921, which was reported to the council on 19 January 1921.

In his place, Councillor Charles Henry Rutherford JP (Conservative, Princes Park, last elected 1 November 1920) was elected as an alderman by the council on 2 March 1921.

Party	Alderman	Ward	Term expires
Conservative	Charles Henry Rutherford JP	No. 25 Walton	1923

=== Aldermanic Election 6 April 1921 ===
Caused by the death of Alderman James Heald (Conservative last elected as an alderman by the council on 9 November 1920), in whose place Councillor Max Muspratt (Liberal, Vauxhall, last elected unopposed on 1 November 1914) was elected by the council as an alderman on 6 April 1921.

Party	Alderman	Ward	Term expires
Liberal	Max Muspratt JP	No. 36 Much Woolton	1926

=== Aldermanic Election 27 July 1921 ===
Caused by the death of Alderman James Willcox Alsop OBE (Conservative, elected as an alderman by the council on 9 November 1914) on 19 May 1921, in whose place Councillor John George Paris (Conservative, Kirkdale, last elected 1 November 1920), Fine Art Dealer of 40 Falkner Square, Liverpool, was elected by the council as an alderman on 27 July 1921.

Party	Alderman	Ward	Term expires
Conservative	John George Paris	No. 15 Sefton Park East	1923

== By-elections ==
=== No. 14 Granby, 23 November 1920 ===
Caused by the election as an alderman of Councillor Joseph Harrison Jones (Liberal, Granby, elected 1 November 1918) by the council on 9 November 1920

No. 14 Granby
Party	Candidate	Votes	%	±%
Liberal	Frederick Charles Bowring	unopposed		
Registered electors				
Liberal hold		Swing		

=== No. 13 Princes Park, 13 December 1920 ===
Caused by the resignation of Councillor Acheson Lyle Rupert Rathbone (Liberal, Princes Park, elected 1 November 1911( which was reported to the council on 1 December 1920.

No. 13 Prince's Park
Party	Candidate	Votes	%	±%
Conservative	Margaret Beavan JP	1,883	79%	
	Thomas Griffith	489	21%	
Majority		1,035		
Registered electors				
Turnout		2,372		
Conservative gain from Liberal		Swing		

=== No. 13 Princes Park, 14 March 1921 ===
Caused by the election by the councillors of Councillor Charles Henry Rutherford JP (Conservative, Princes Park, last elected 1 November 1920) as an alderman on 2 March 1921, following the death of Alderman William Roberts (Conservative, last elected as an Alderman by the councillors on 9 November 1913) on 17 January 1921

No. 13 Prince's Park
Party	Candidate	Votes	%	±%
	Robert Lowry Burns	unopposed		
Registered electors				
	gain from	Swing		

=== No. 4 Vauxhall ===
Caused by the election by the council as an alderman of Councillor Max Muspratt (Liberal, Vauxhall, last elected unopposed on 1 November 1914) on 6 April 1921, following the death of Alderman James Heald (Conservative last elected as an alderman by the council on 9 November 1920).

=== No. 24 Kirkdale 8 August 1921 ===
Caused by the election as an alderman by the Council of Councillor John George Paris (Conservative, Kirkdale, last elected 1 November 1920) on 27 July 1921, following the death of Alderman James Willcox Alsop OBE (Conservative, elected as an alderman by the council on 9 November 1914) on 19 May 1921

No. 24 Kirkdale
Party	Candidate	Votes	%	±%
	Archibald Gordon Gullan	3,839	%	
	Frederick Jones	1,450	%	
Majority				
Registered electors				
Turnout			%	
	gain from	Swing		

=== No. 7 Castle Street 28 September 1921 ===
Caused by the death of Councillor Frank Ambrose Goodwin (Conservative, Castle Street, last elected as a councillor on 1 November 1919) on 14 July 1921

No. 7 Castle Street
Party	Candidate	Votes	%	±%
Conservative	John Sandeman Allen	Unopposed	N/A	N/A
Registered electors				
Conservative hold				

== See also ==
- Liverpool City Council
- Liverpool Town Council elections 1835 - 1879
- Liverpool City Council elections 1880–present
- Mayors and Lord Mayors of Liverpool 1207 to present
- History of local government in England
