= 1904 Liverpool City Council election =

Liverpool City Council elections 1904

← 1903	November 1, 1904	1905 →

34 seats were up for election (one third): one seat for each of the 34 wards 69 (incl. Aldermen) seats needed for a majority

Elections to Liverpool City Council were held on 1 November 1904.

The first seat for the new ward of Old Swan, and the second seat for Wavertree West were up for election for the first time.

18 of the 34 seats were uncontested.

After the election, the composition of the council was:

Party	Councillors	±	Aldermen	Total
Conservative	??	-3	??	??
Liberal	??	+4	??	??
Irish Nationalist	??	0	??	??
Protestant	5	+2	0	5
Liberal Unionist	??	-1	??	??
Irish Nationalist and Liberal	1	0	0	1
Labour	??	??	0	??
Independent	??	??	??	??

== Election result ==
Liverpool local election result 1904
Party	Seats	Gains	Losses	Net gain/loss	Seats %	Votes %	Votes	+/−
Conservative	15	2	5	-3	39%			
Liberal	14	4	0	+4	37%			
Irish Nationalist	3	0	0	0	9%			
Protestant	2	2	0	+2	6%			
Liberal Unionist	0	0	1	-1	0%			
Labour Repr. Cmte.	0	0	0	0	0%			
Independent	0	0	0	0	0%			

== Ward results ==
* - Retiring Councillor seeking re-election

Comparisons are made with the 1901 election results, as the retiring councillors were elected in that year.

=== Abercromby ===
No. 21 Abercromby
Party	Candidate	Votes	%	±%
Liberal	Dr. William Permewan	837	51%	
Conservative	William Phillips *	813	49%	
Majority		24		
Registered electors		2,699		
Turnout		1,650	61%	
Liberal gain from Conservative		Swing		

=== Aigburth ===
No. 29 Aigburth
Party	Candidate	Votes	%	±%
Liberal	Archibald Bathgate *	unopposed		
Registered electors				
Liberal hold		Swing		

=== Anfield ===
No. 3 Anfield
Party	Candidate	Votes	%	±%
Conservative	Edward Russell Taylor	unopposed		
Registered electors				
Conservative hold		Swing		

=== Breckfield ===
No. 6 Breckfield
Party	Candidate	Votes	%	±%
Conservative	Edwin Berry *	1,458	57%	
Protestant	William Ellis Jones	1,119	43%	
Majority		339		
Registered electors		4,258		
Turnout		2,577	61%	
Conservative hold		Swing		

=== Brunswick ===
No. 25 Brunswick
Party	Candidate	Votes	%	±%
Liberal	Thomas Byrne *	unopposed		
Registered electors				
Liberal hold		Swing		

=== Castle Street ===
No. 18 Castle Street
Party	Candidate	Votes	%	±%
Conservative	Charles Frederick Garner	748	53%	
Liberal	Thomas James McGeorge	668	47%	
Majority		80		
Registered electors		2,104		
Turnout		1,416	67%	
Conservative hold		Swing		

=== Dingle ===
No. 26 Dingle
Party	Candidate	Votes	%	±%
Conservative	Edward James Chevalier *	unopposed		
Registered electors				
Conservative hold		Swing		

=== Edge Hill ===
No. 12 Edge Hill
Party	Candidate	Votes	%	±%
Conservative	William Wilson Walker *	1,232	50.3%	
Liberal	Clement Freeman	1,219	49.7%	
Majority		13		
Registered electors		4,901		
Turnout		2,451	50%	
Conservative hold		Swing		

=== Everton ===
No. 9 Everton
Party	Candidate	Votes	%	±%
Conservative	Gerald Kyffin-Taylor*	Unopposed	N/A	N/A
Registered electors				
Conservative hold				

=== Exchange ===
No. 16 Exchange
Party	Candidate	Votes	%	±%
Liberal	Robert Durning Holt *	unopposed		
Registered electors				
Liberal hold		Swing		

=== Fairfield ===
No. 4 Fairfield
Party	Candidate	Votes	%	±%
Liberal	James Hughes jnr	1,217	55%	
Conservative	Joseph Hunter *	1,005	45%	
Majority		212		
Registered electors		3,497		
Turnout		2,222	64%	
Liberal gain from Conservative		Swing		

=== Garston ===
No. 30 Garston
Party	Candidate	Votes	%	±%
Conservative	Frederick James Rawlinson *	unopposed		
Registered electors				
Conservative hold		Swing		

=== Granby ===
No. 22 Granby
Party	Candidate	Votes	%	±%
Liberal	Robert Henry Bullen *	unopposed		
Registered electors				
Liberal hold		Swing		

=== Great George ===
No. 20 Great George
Party	Candidate	Votes	%	±%
Liberal	Burton William Eills *	738	58%	
Conservative	Edmund Roberts Latham	527	42%	
Majority		211		
Registered electors		1,796		
Turnout		1,265	70%	
Liberal hold		Swing		

=== Kensington ===
No. 11 Kensington
Party	Candidate	Votes	%	±%
Conservative	Samuel Mason Hutchinson *	1,424	68%	
Protestant	Joseph Bowers	685	32%	
Majority		739		
Registered electors		4,638		
Turnout		2,109	45%	
Conservative gain from Liberal Unionist		Swing		

=== Kirkdale ===
No. 2 Kirkdale
Party	Candidate	Votes	%	±%
Protestant	John George Paris	unopposed		
Registered electors				
Protestant gain from Conservative		Swing		

=== Low Hill ===
No. 10 Low Hill
Party	Candidate	Votes	%	±%
Conservative	William Boote *	unopposed		
Registered electors				
Conservative hold		Swing		

=== Netherfield ===
No. 8 Netherfield
Party	Candidate	Votes	%	±%
Liberal	George Sturla *	1,472	60%	
Protestant	John Carr	976	40%	
Majority		496		
Registered electors		4,144		
Turnout		2,448	59%	
Liberal hold		Swing		

=== North Scotland ===
No. 13 North Scotland
Party	Candidate	Votes	%	±%
Irish Nationalist	George Jeremy Lynskey *	unopposed		
Registered electors				
Irish Nationalist hold		Swing		

=== Old Swan ===
No. 28A Old Swan
Party	Candidate	Votes	%	±%
Conservative	James Lister	unopposed		
Registered electors				
Conservative win (new seat)				

=== Prince's Park ===
No. 23 Prince's Park
Party	Candidate	Votes	%	±%
Liberal	Max Muspratt *	1,234	58%	
Protestant	Robert Griffiths	900	42%	
Majority		334		
Registered electors		3,625		
Turnout		2,134	59%	
Liberal hold		Swing		

=== Sandhills ===
No. 1 Sandhills
Party	Candidate	Votes	%	±%
Liberal	James Arthur Appleton	1,075	55%	
Conservative	Harris Fineberg	889	45%	
Majority		186		
Registered electors		3,364		
Turnout		1,964	58%	
Liberal hold		Swing		

=== St. Anne's ===
No. 17 St. Anne's
Party	Candidate	Votes	%	±%
Conservative	Isaac Caton Glover *	1,028	78%	
Independent	Edward Joseph Gearing	294	22%	
Majority		734		
Registered electors		3,025		
Turnout		1,322	44%	
Conservative hold		Swing		

=== St. Domingo ===
No. 7 St. Domingo
Party	Candidate	Votes	%	±%
Protestant	Henry Porter	1,518	53%	
Conservative	Anthony Shelmerdine *	1,323	47%	
Majority		195		
Registered electors		4,530		
Turnout		2,841	63%	
Protestant gain from Conservative		Swing		

=== St. Peter's ===
No. 19 St. Peter's
Party	Candidate	Votes	%	±%
Liberal	Henry Miles *	629	70%	
Labour	Walter Russell	269	30%	
Majority		360		
Registered electors		1,806		
Turnout		898	50%	
Liberal hold		Swing		

=== Sefton Park East ===
No. 24A Sefton Park East
Party	Candidate	Votes	%	±%
Liberal	John Morris *	unopposed		
Registered electors				
Liberal hold		Swing		

=== Sefton Park West ===
No. 24 Sefton Park West
Party	Candidate	Votes	%	±%
Liberal	Joseph Wilson	768	62%	
Conservative	Thomas Stanley Rogerson *	478	38%	
Majority		290		
Registered electors		3,001		
Turnout		1,246	42%	
Liberal gain from Conservative		Swing		

=== South Scotland ===
No. 14 South Scotland
Party	Candidate	Votes	%	±%
Irish Nationalist	Francis Joseph Harford *	unopposed		
Registered electors				
Irish Nationalist hold		Swing		

=== Vauxhall ===
No. 15 Vauxhall
Party	Candidate	Votes	%	±%
Irish Nationalist	John Gregory Taggart *	unopposed		
Registered electors				
Irish Nationalist hold		Swing		

=== Walton ===
No. 3A Walton
Party	Candidate	Votes	%	±%
Conservative	Dr. John George Moyles *	unopposed		
Registered electors				
Conservative hold		Swing		

=== Warbreck ===
No. 27 Warbreck
Party	Candidate	Votes	%	±%
Conservative	Richard Kelly *	unopposed		
Registered electors				
Conservative hold		Swing		

=== Wavertree ===
No. 5 Wavertree
Party	Candidate	Votes	%	±%
Conservative	Robert Stephen Porter	unopposed		
Registered electors				
Conservative hold		Swing		

=== Wavertree West ===
No. 5A Wavertree West
Party	Candidate	Votes	%	±%
Liberal	Cecil Heywood Brunner	1,110	54%	
Conservative	Isaac Turner *	948	46%	
Majority		162		
Registered electors		3,417		
Turnout		2,058	60%	
Liberal win (new seat)				

=== West Derby ===
No. 28 West Derby
Party	Candidate	Votes	%	±%
Conservative	Robert Edward Walkington Stephenson	986	55%	
Liberal	Thomas Utley	809	45%	
Majority		177		
Registered electors		2,468		
Turnout		1,795	73%	
Conservative hold		Swing		

== Aldermanic Elections ==
At the meeting of the Council on 9 November 1904, the terms of office of seventeen alderman expired.

The following seventeen were elected as Aldermen by the Council (Aldermen and Councillors) on 9 November 1904 for a term of six years.

* - re-elected aldermen.

Party	Alderman	Ward
Conservative	William Bartlett *	Brunswick
Liberal	William Benjamin Bowring JP *	Exchange
Liberal	Edmond Brownbill *	South Scotland
Conservative	William James Burgess *	Anfield
Irish Nationalist	Dr. Andrew Commins MP *	Vauxhall
Conservative	Charles Herbert Giles *	Prince's Park
Liberal	Jacob Reuben Grant *	Old Swan
Conservative	Thomas Menlove JP *	Breckfield
Liberal	Edward Paull JP *	Sandhills
Conservative	Sir Charles Petrie	Warbreck
Irish Nationalist	Edward Purcell *	North Scotland
Conservative	Archibald Tutton Salvidge the younger JP	Abercromby
Liberal	Frederick Smith *	Castle Street
Conservative	Edward Wrake Turner *	Aigburth
Conservative	Ephraim Walker JP *	Sefton Park West
Liberal	William Henry Watts *	St. Anne's
Conservative	William Humphrey Williams *	St. Domingo

- Alderman John Ellison (Conservative, elected 9 November 1901) died on 17 October 1904

In his place, Councillor Thomas Bland Royden (Conservative, Kensington, elected 16 December 1903) was elected as an alderman for the Sefton Park East ward.

Party	Alderman	Ward	Term expires
Conservative	Councillor Thomas Bland Royden	No.24A Sefton Park East	1907

== By-elections ==
=== No.11 Kensington, 23 November 1904 ===
Caused by the election of Councillor Thomas Bland Royden (Conservative, Kensington, elected 16 December 1903) as an alderman on 9 November 1904

No. 11 Kensington
Party	Candidate	Votes	%	±%
Conservative	Robert Lowry Burns	1,321		
	Benjamin Loft Wilson	1,280		
Majority		41		
Registered electors				
Turnout		2,501		
Conservative gain from Liberal Unionist		Swing		

=== No. 7 St. Domingo, 17 January 1905 ===
The resignation of Councillor Joseph Bennett Colton (Conservative, St. Domingo, elected 1 November 1902) was reported to the Council on 4 January 1905

No. 7 St. Domingo
Party	Candidate	Votes	%	±%
Protestant	William Ellis Jones	943	53%	
Conservative	Charles Alexander Hill	821	46%	
	John Henry Newcomb	22	1.2%	
Majority		122		
Registered electors				
Turnout		1,786		
Protestant gain from Conservative		Swing		

== See also ==
- Liverpool City Council
- Liverpool Town Council elections 1835 - 1879
- Liverpool City Council elections 1880–present
- Mayors and Lord Mayors of Liverpool 1207 to present
- History of local government in England
