= 1914 Liverpool City Council election =

1914 English local government election

Elections to Liverpool City Council were due to be held on 2 November 1914.

Due to the First World War none of the seats were contested.

Annual local elections were suspended from 1915 to 1919. Under the Elections and Registration Act 1915 the term of office of all members of the Council was extended by one year and casual vacancies among the members of the Council were filled by the choice of the Council, rather than by election. Subsequently, the Parliament and Local Elections Acts of 1916, 1917 and 1918 each further extended the term of office of all members of the Council by a year.

After the election, the composition of the council was:

Party	Councillors	±	Aldermen	Total
Conservative	??	??	??	??
Liberal	??	??	??	??
Irish Nationalist	??	??	??	??
Labour	??	??	0	??
Independent	??	0	0	??

== Election result ==
Liverpool local election result 1914
Party	Seats	Gains	Losses	Net gain/loss	Seats %	Votes %	Votes	+/−
Conservative		0	0					
Liberal		0	0	0				
Labour		0	0	0			14,966	
Irish Nationalist		0	0	0				
Independents		0	0	0				

== Ward results ==
* - Retiring Councillor seeking re-election

Comparisons are made with the 1911 election results, as the retiring councillors were elected in that year.

=== Abercromby ===
No. 18 Abercromby
Party	Candidate	Votes	%	±%
Conservative	Charles Henry Hayhurst	unopposed		
Registered electors				
Conservative hold		Swing		

=== Aigburth ===
No. 36 Aigburth
Party	Candidate	Votes	%	±%
Conservative	William James Burgess *	unopposed		
Registered electors				
Conservative hold		Swing		

=== Anfield ===
No. 3 Anfield
Party	Candidate	Votes	%	±%
Liberal	William Evans *	unopposed		
Registered electors				
Liberal hold		Swing		

=== Breckfield ===
No. 5 Breckfield
Party	Candidate	Votes	%	±%
Conservative	Edward Powell *	unopposed		
Registered electors				
Conservative hold		Swing		

=== Brunswick ===
No. 19 Brunswick
Party	Candidate	Votes	%	±%
Labour	Patrick Kean	unopposed		
Registered electors				
Labour hold		Swing		

=== Castle Street ===
No. 15 Castle Street
Party	Candidate	Votes	%	±%
Liberal	Richard George Hough *	unopposed		
Registered electors				
Liberal hold		Swing		

=== Dingle ===
No. 20 Dingle
Party	Candidate	Votes	%	±%
Conservative	James Caughey Walker	unopposed		
Registered electors				
Conservative hold		Swing		

=== Edge Hill ===
No. 10 Edge Hill
Party	Candidate	Votes	%	±%
Labour	Frederick Thomas Richardson	unopposed		
Registered electors				
Labour hold		Swing		

=== Everton ===
No. 4 Everton
Party	Candidate	Votes	%	±%
Labour	John Henry Naylor *	unopposed		
Registered electors				
Labour hold		Swing		

=== Exchange ===
No. 13 Exchange
Party	Candidate	Votes	%	±%
Liberal	Charles Sydney Jones	unopposed		
Registered electors				
Liberal hold		Swing		

=== Fairfield ===
No. 25 Fairfield
Party	Candidate	Votes	%	±%
Conservative	Thomas Dowd *	unopposed		
Registered electors				
Conservative hold		Swing		

=== Fazakerley ===
No. 33 Fazakerley
Party	Candidate	Votes	%	±%
Conservative	George Brodrick Smith-Brodrick *	unopposed		
Registered electors				
Conservative hold		Swing		

=== Garston ===
No. 37 Garston
Party	Candidate	Votes	%	±%
Labour	William Albert Robinson *	unopposed		
Registered electors				
Labour hold		Swing		

=== Granby ===
No. 24 Granby
Party	Candidate	Votes	%	±%
Conservative	James Waterworth *	unopposed		
Registered electors				
Conservative hold		Swing		

=== Great George ===
No. 17 Great George
Party	Candidate	Votes	%	±%
Liberal	John Lamport Eills *	unopposed		
Registered electors				
Liberal hold		Swing		

=== Kensington ===
No. 9 Kensington
Party	Candidate	Votes	%	±%
Conservative	John Gordon *	unopposed		
Registered electors				
Conservative hold		Swing		

=== Kirkdale ===
No. 2 Kirkdale
Party	Candidate	Votes	%	±%
Conservative	John Lucas Rankin *	unopposed		
Registered electors				
Conservative hold		Swing		

=== Low Hill ===
No. 11 Low Hill
Party	Candidate	Votes	%	±%
Labour	George Nelson *	Unopposed	N/A	N/A
Registered electors				
Labour hold				

=== Netherfield ===
No. 8 Netherfield
Party	Candidate	Votes	%	±%
Conservative	Harold Edward Davies *	unopposed		
Registered electors				
Conservative hold		Swing		

=== North Scotland ===
No. 7 North Scotland
Party	Candidate	Votes	%	±%
Irish Nationalist	James Bolger *	unopposed		
Registered electors				
Irish Nationalist hold		Swing		

=== Old Swan ===
No. 32 Old Swan
Party	Candidate	Votes	%	±%
Conservative	John Edwards *	unopposed		
Registered electors				
Conservative hold		Swing		

=== Prince's Park ===
No. 23 Prince's Park
Party	Candidate	Votes	%	±%
Liberal	Acheson Lyle Rupert Rathbone *	unopposed		
Registered electors				
Liberal hold		Swing		

=== Sandhills ===
No. 1 Sandhills
Party	Candidate	Votes	%	±%
Irish Nationalist	John Cunningham	unopposed		
Registered electors				
Irish Nationalist hold		Swing		

=== St. Anne's ===
No. 17 St. Anne's
Party	Candidate	Votes	%	±%
Labour	James Sexton *	Unopposed	N/A	N/A
Registered electors				
Labour hold				

=== St. Domingo ===
No. 6 St. Domingo
Party	Candidate	Votes	%	±%
Labour	Charles Wilson	unopposed		
Registered electors				
Labour hold		Swing		

=== St. Peter's ===
No. 19 St. Peter's
Party	Candidate	Votes	%	±%
Liberal	Burton William Ellis *	unopposed		
Registered electors				
Liberal hold		Swing		

=== Sefton Park East ===
No. 22 Sefton Park East
Party	Candidate	Votes	%	±%
	Arthur Bromley Holmes*	unopposed		
Registered electors				
		Swing		

=== Sefton Park West ===
No. 21 Sefton Park West
Party	Candidate	Votes	%	±%
Conservative	Ernest Cranstoun Given *	unopposed		
Registered electors				
Conservative hold		Swing		

=== South Scotland ===
No. 8 South Scotland
Party	Candidate	Votes	%	±%
Irish Nationalist	Patrick Jeremiah Kelly *	unopposed		
Registered electors				
Irish Nationalist hold		Swing		

=== Vauxhall ===
No. 15 Vauxhall
Party	Candidate	Votes	%	±%
Liberal	Max Muspratt *	unopposed		
Registered electors				
Liberal hold		Swing		

=== Walton ===
No. 27 Walton
Party	Candidate	Votes	%	±%
Conservative	James Conrad Cross *	1,687	67%	
Registered electors				
Conservative hold		Swing		

=== Warbreck ===
No. 28 Warbreck
Party	Candidate	Votes	%	±%
Liberal	Edward West *	unopposed		
Registered electors				
Liberal hold		Swing		

=== Wavertree ===
No. 30 Wavertree
Party	Candidate	Votes	%	±%
Liberal	Charles Clarke Morrison *	unopposed		
Registered electors				
Liberal hold		Swing		

=== Wavertree West ===
No. 29 Wavertree West
Party	Candidate	Votes	%	±%
Conservative	Dennis Benjamin Seaman *	unopposed		
Registered electors				
Conservative hold		Swing		

=== West Derby ===
No. 28 West Derby
Party	Candidate	Votes	%	±%
Conservative	William James Bailes *	unopposed		
Registered electors				
Conservative hold		Swing		

== Aldermanic Elections ==
=== Aldermanic Election 9 November 1914 ===
The resignation of Alderman Sir Thomas Bland Royden Bart. (Conservative, elected as an alderman by the Council on 9 November 1913) was reported to the Council on 28 October 1914.

In his place, Councillor James Willcox Alsop (Conservative, Castle Street, elected 1 November 1912) was elected by the Council as an alderman on 9 November 1914

Party	Alderman	Ward	Term expires
Conservative	James Willcox Alsop	No. 22 Sefton Park East	1919

=== Aldermanic Elections 3 February 1915 ===
Caused by the death of Alderman Edmond Brownbill (Liberal), elected by the Council as an alderman on 9 November 1910) on 12 December 1914

In his place, Councillor John Lamport Eills (Liberal, Great George, elected 2 November 1914) was elected by the Council as an alderman on 3 February 1915.

Party	Alderman	Ward	Term expires
Liberal	John Lamport Eills	No. 8 South Scotland	1916

Caused by the death of Alderman William Radcliffe JP (Conservative), elected by the Council as an alderman on 9 November 1913) on 15 December 1914

In his place, Councillor William James Burgess (Conservative, Aigburth, elected 18 March 1913) was elected as an alderman by the Council on 3 February 1915.

Party	Alderman	Ward	Term expires
Conservative	William James Burgess	No. 37 Garston	1919

== Aldermanic Appointments ==
=== Aldermanic Appointments 9 November 1916 ===
Caused by the death of Alderman Sir William Benjamin Bowring, Baronet (Liberal, elected by the Council as an alderman on 9 November 1910) on 20 October 1916, which was reported to the Council on 25 October 1916

In his place Councillor William Evans JP (Liberal, Anfield, elected 1 November 1911) was appointed by the Council as an alderman on 9 November 1916

Party	Former Alderman	Appointed Replacement	Term expires
Liberal	Sir William Benjamin Bowring, Baronet	Councillor William Evans JP	1919

Following the resignation of Alderman Robert Edward Walkington Stephenson (Conservative, elected by the Council as an alderman on 9 November 1913) which was reported to the Council on 9 November 1916, Councillor Robert Stephen Porter (Conservative, Wavertree, elected 1 November 1913) was appointed by the Council as an alderman on 3 January 1917 in his place

Party	Former Alderman	Appointed Replacement	Term expires
Conservative	Robert Edward Walkington Stephenson	Councillor Robert Stephen Porter	1919

=== Aldermanic Appointment 6 June 1917 ===
Caused by the resignation of Alderman Frank John Leslie (Conservative, elected by the Council as an alderman on 8 January 1913) was reported to the Council on 2 May 1917. In his place Councillor Samuel Mason Hutchinson JP (Conservative, Kensington, elected by the Council as an alderman on 1 November 1913) was appointed as an alderman by the Council on 6 June 1917

Party	Former Alderman	Appointed Replacement	Term expires
Conservative	Frank John Leslie	Councillor Samuel Mason Hutchinson JP	1919

=== Aldermanic Appointment, 5 September 1917 ===
The death, on 6 June 1917, of Alderman William Bartlett (Conservative, elected as an Alderman by the Council on 9 November 1910).

In his place Councillor Edward Russell-Taylor (Conservative, Anfield, elected 1 November 1913) was appointed by the Council as an alderman on 5 September 1917 .

Party	Former Alderman	Appointed Replacement	Term expires
Conservative	William Bartlett	Councillor Edward Russell-Taylor	1919

=== Aldermanic Appointments 9 November 1917 ===
The Resignation of Alderman Charles Herbert Giles (Conservative, elected as an alderman by the Council on 9 November 1910) was reported to the Council on 31 October 1916. In his place Councillor William Boote (Conservative, Low Hill, elected 1 November 1913) was appointed by the Council as an alderman on 9 November 1917 .

Party	Former Alderman	Appointed Replacement	Term expires
Conservative	Charles Herbert Giles	Councillor William Boote	1919

The Resignation of Alderman Richard Kelly (Conservative, elected as an alderman by the Council on 9 November 1913) was reported to the Council on 31 October 1916.

In his place Councillor George Brodrick Smith-Brodrick (Conservative, Fazakerley, elected 19 March 1913) was appointed by the Council as an alderman on 9 November 1917.

Party	Former Alderman	Appointed Replacement	Term expires
Conservative	Richard Kelly	George Brodrick Smith-Brodrick	1919

== By-Elections ==
=== No. 6 St. Domingo, 4 November 1914 ===
Caused by the death of Councillor Dr. Charles Alexander Hill (Conservative, St. Domingo, elected 1 November 1913) on 24 August 1914.

No. 6 St. Domingo
Party	Candidate	Votes	%	±%
Conservative	William May	unopposed		
Registered electors				
Conservative hold		Swing		

=== No. 15 Castle Street, November? 1914 ===
Caused by the election as an alderman by the Council of Councillor James Willcox Alsop (Conservative, Castle Street, elected 1 November 1912) on 9 November 1914, following the resignation of Alderman Sir Thomas Bland Royden Bart. (Conservative, elected as an alderman by the Council on 9 November 1913) which was reported to the Council on 28 October 1914

=== No. 17 Great George, 25 February 1915 ===
Caused by the election by the Council of Councillor John Lamport Eills (Liberal, Great George, elected 2 November 1914) as an alderman on 3 February 1915, following the death of Alderman Edmond Brownbill (Liberal, elected by the Council as an alderman on 9 November 1910) on 12 December 1914 .

No. 17 Great George
Party	Candidate	Votes	%	±%
Liberal	Dr. William Henry Broad	unopposed		
Registered electors				
Liberal hold		Swing		

=== No. 36 Aigburth, 2 March 1915 ===
Caused by Councillor William James Burgess (Conservative, Aigburth, elected 18 March 1913) being elected as an alderman by the Council on 3 February 1915, following the death of Alderman William Radcliffe JP (Conservative), elected by the Council as an alderman on 9 November 1913) on 15 December 1914

No. 36 Aigburth
Party	Candidate	Votes	%	±%
Conservative	John Ritchie	unopposed		
Registered electors				
Conservative hold		Swing		

== Appointment of Councillors ==
=== No. 18 Abercromby, 9 November 1915 ===
Following the resignation of Councillor Edward Lawrence (Conservative, Abercromby, elected 1 November 1912), which was reported to the Council on 27 October 1915, his position was filled by Edwin Thompson, Manufacturing Chemist of 25 Sefton Drive, Liverpool, was appointed by the Council on 9 November 1915.

Ward	Party	Resigning Councillor	Appointed Replacement	Term expires
No.18 Abercromby	Conservative	Edward Lawrence	Edwin Thompson	1916

=== No. 37 Garston, 9 November 1915 ===
Following the resignation of Councillor Joshua Burrow (Conservative, Garston, elected 1 November 1912), which was reported to the Council on 27 October 1915, Thomas Tushingham, Licensed Victualler of 31 Window Lane, Garston was appointed by the Council in his place on 8 November 1915.

Ward	Party	Resigning Councillor	Appointed Replacement	Term expires
No. 37, Garston	Conservative	Joshua Burrow	Thomas Tushingham	1916

=== No. 20 Dingle, 3 February 1916 ===
Following the resignation of Councillor Thomas Charles Huxley (Conservative, Dingle, elected 1 November 1912), William Wallace Kelly, Theatre Proprietor of 3 Holly Bank Road, Birkenhead, was appointed in his place by the Council on 3 February 1915 .

Ward	Party	Resigning Councillor	Appointed Replacement	Term expires
No. 20 Dingle	Conservative	Thomas Charles Huxley	William Wallace Kelly	1916

=== No. 18 Abercromby, 5 April 1916 ===
Following the resignation of Councillor Charles Henry Hayhurst (Conservative, Abercromby, elected 1 November 1911) , which was reported to the Council on 1 March 1916 , Colonel Robert Montgomery, Corn Broker of 8 Brunswick Street, Liverpool, was appointed in his place by the Council on 5 April 1916 .

Ward	Party	Resigning Councillor	Appointed Replacement	Term expires
No.18 Abercromby	Conservative	Charles Henry Hayhurst	Col. Robert Montgomery	1916

=== No. 20 Dingle, 5 April 1916 ===
Following the resignation of Councillor Alfred James Branwood (Conservative, Dingle, elected 1 November 1913), Joseph Dalton Wood, Coal Contractor of 8 Drury Buildings, 21 Water Street, Liverpool, was appointed in his place by the Council on 5 April 1916

Ward	Party	Resigning Councillor	Appointed Replacement	Term expires
No. 20 Dingle	Conservative	Alfred James Branwood	Joseph Dalton Wood	1916

=== No. 17 Great George, 4 October 1916 ===
Following the resignation of Councillor Thomas Philip Maguire (Conservative, Great George, elected 27 November 1913), his place was taken by Thomas Owen Ruddin JP of Stapely House, Grassendale Park North, Aigburth .

Ward	Party	Resigning Councillor	Appointed Replacement	Term expires
No. 17 Great George	Conservative	Thomas Philip Maguire	Thomas Owen Ruddin JP	1916

=== No. 34 Allerton, Childwall and Little Woolton, 4 October 1916 ===
Following the resignation of Councillor Henry Glover (Conservative, Allerton, Childwall and Little Woolton, elected 1 November 1913) which was reported to the Council on 6 September 1916, Herbert Plant Harrison was appointed by the Council in his place on 4 October 1916 .

Ward	Party	Resigning Councillor	Appointed Replacement	Term expires
No. 34 Allerton, Childwall and Little Woolton	Conservative	Henry Glover	Herbert Plant Harrison	1917

=== No. 29 Wavertree West ===
Caused by the death of Councillor Alfred Parsons (Conservative, Wavertree West, elected 1 November 1912) on 11 November 1916 .

John Glyn was appointed by the Council as a councillor, in his place, to represent the Wavertree West ward.

No. 26 Anfield, 6 December 1916
Party	Former Councillor	Appointed Replacement	Term expires
Conservative	Alfred Parsons	John Glyn	1919

=== No. 26 Anfield, 6 December 1916 ===
Caused by the appointment of Councillor William Evans JP (Liberal, Anfield, elected 1 November 1911) by the Council as an alderman on 9 November 1916 in order to fill the position vacated when Alderman Sir William Benjamin Bowring, Baronet (Liberal, elected by the Council as an alderman on 9 November 1910) died on 20 October 1916, which was reported to the Council on 25 October 1916.

Wilfred Bowring Stoddart JP of "Birkgate" Grassendale Park South, Aigburth was appointed by the Council as a Councillor to represent the Anfield ward

No. 26 Anfield, 6 December 1916
Party	Former Councillor	Appointed Replacement	Term expires
Conservative	William Evans JP	Wilfred Bowring Stoddart JP	1919

=== No. 30 Wavertree, 7 February 1917 ===
Following the appointment by the Council of Councillor Robert Stephen Porter (Conservative, Wavertree, elected 1 November 1913) as an alderman on 3 January 1917 following the resignation of Alderman Robert Edward Walkington Stephenson (Conservative, elected by the Council as an alderman on 9 November 1913) which was reported to the Council on 9 November 1916, Alfred Henry Bramley was appointed by the Council as a Councillor for the Wavertree ward on 7 February 1917

No. 30 Wavertree, 7 February 1917
Party	Former Councillor	Appointed Replacement	Term expires
Conservative	Robert Stephen Porter	Alfred Henry Bramley	1919

=== No. 12 Vauxhall, 2 May 1917 ===
Following the death of Councillor Joseph Hughes (Irish Nationalist, Vauxhall, elected 1 November 1913) on 11 February 1917, which was reported to the Council on 7 March 1917, James O'Hare, Fancy Goods Merchant of 101 Richmond Row, Liverpool was appointed as a Councillor by the Council on 2 May 1917 .

No. 12 Vauxhall, 2 May 1917
Party	Former Councillor	Appointed Replacement	Term expires
Irish Nationalist	Joseph Hughes	James O'Hare	1919

=== No. 8 South Scotland, 2 May 1917 ===
Following the death of Councillor Francis Joseph Harford JP (Irish Nationalist, South Scotland, elected 1 November 1913) on 17 February 1917, which was reported to the Council on 7 March 1917 , in his place John Morley, Cashier and Book Keeper of 74 Dunluce Street, Walton, Liverpool was appointed by the Council as a Councillor for the South Scotland ward on 2 May 2017 .

No. 8 South Scotland, 2 May 1917
Party	Former Councillor	Appointed Replacement	Term expires
Irish Nationalist	Francis Joseph Harford JP	John Morley	1919

=== No. 30 Wavertree, 2 May 1917 ===
Following the death of Councillor Charles Clarke Morrison (Liberal, Wavertree, elected 1 November 1911) on 20 March 1917, which was reported to the Council on 4 April 1917 . His position was taken by Robert Henry Morgan, Forwarding Agent of 3 Green Lane, Mossley Hill, who was appointed by the Council as a Councillor for the Wavertree ward on 2 May 1917 .

No. 30 Wavertree, 2 May 1917
Party	Former Councillor	Appointed Replacement	Term expires
Conservative	Charles Clarke Morrison	Robert Henry Morgan	1919

=== No. 9 Kensington, 4 July 1917 ===
Caused by the resignation of Alderman Frank John Leslie (Conservative, elected by the Council as an alderman on 8 January 1913) which was reported to the Council on 2 May 1917 and the subsequent election by the Council of Councillor Samuel Mason Hutchinson JP (Conservative, Kensington, elected on 1 November 1913) as an alderman by the Council on 6 June 1917.

On 4 July 1917, Joseph Ashworth, Builder and Contractor of 30 Holt Road, Liverpool was appointed by the Council as a Councillor for the Kensington ward

No. 9 Kensington, 4 July 1917
Party	Former Councillor	Appointed Replacement	Term expires
Conservative	Samuel Mason Hutchinson JP	Joseph Ashworth	1919

=== No. 26 Anfield, 3 October 1917 ===
Caused by Councillor Edward Russell-Taylor (Conservative, Anfield, elected 1 November 1913) being elected by the Council as an alderman on 5 September 1917 following the death, on 6 June 1917, of Alderman William Bartlett (Conservative, elected as an Alderman by the Council on 9 November 1910).

John Greville Earle JP of 63 Upper Parliament Street, Liverpool was appointed as a Councillor for the Anfield ward on 3 October 1917.

No. 26 Anfield, 3 October 1917
Party	Former Councillor	Appointed Replacement	Term expires
Conservative	Edward Russell-Taylor	John Greville Earle JP	1919

=== No. 36 Aigburth, 9 November 1917 ===
Caused by the death of Councillor William Parkfield Wethered (Conservative, Aigburth, elected 1 November 1913) on 17 October 1917 . In whose place, Commander John Howard Temple RNVR was appointed by the Council as a Councillor for the Aigburth ward on 9 November 1917.

No. 36 Aigburth, 9 November 1917
Party	Former Councillor	Appointed Replacement	Term expires
Conservative	Councillor William Parkfield Wethered	Commander John Howard Temple RNVR	1919

=== No. 11 Low Hill, 5 December 1917 ===
Caused by Councillor William Boote (Conservative, Low Hill, elected 1 November 1913) being appointed by the Council as an alderman on 9 November 1917, following the Resignation of Alderman Charles Herbert Giles (Conservative, elected as an alderman by the Council on 9 November 1910) was reported to the Council on 31 October 1916.

George Anthony Metcalfe, Billiard Table Manufacturer of 9 Holly Road, Fairfield, Liverpool, was appointed by the Council as a Councillor on 5 December 1917.

No. 11 Low Hill, 5 December 1917
Party	Former Councillor	Appointed Replacement	Term expires
Conservative	Councillor William Boote	George Anthony Metcalfe	1919

=== No. 11 Fazakerley, 2 January 1918 ===
Caused by the Council appointing Councillor George Brodrick Smith-Brodrick (Conservative, Fazakerley, elected 19 March 1913) as an alderman on 9 November 1917, following the resignation of Alderman Richard Kelly (Conservative, elected as an alderman by the Council on 9 November 1913) which was reported to the Council on 31 October 1916.

In his place Albert Edward Jacob JP was appointed by the Council as a Councillor on 2 January 1918

No. 11 Low Hill, 5 December 1917
Party	Former Councillor	Appointed Replacement	Term expires
Conservative	George Brodrick Smith-Brodrick	Albert Edward Jacob JP	1920

=== No. 27 Walton, 4 April 1918 ===
Caused by the death of Councillor Richard Pritchard (Conservative, Walton, elected 1 November 1912) on 7 December 1915.

In his place Arthur Lloyd, Builder and Contractor of 46 Mandeville Street, was appointed by the Council as a Councillor on 4 April 1918

No. 27 Walton, 4 April 1918
Party	Former Councillor	Appointed Replacement	Term expires
Conservative	Richard Pritchard	Arthur Lloyd	1920

=== No. 28 West Derby, 4 April 1918 ===
Caused by the death of Councillor William Henry Parkinson JP (Conservative, West Derby, elected 1 November 1912) on 12 February 1918

In his place John Ellis, Butcher of Town Row, West Derby, was appointed by the Council as a Councillor on 4 April 1918

No. 28 West Derby, 4 April 1918
Party	Former Councillor	Appointed Replacement	Term expires
Conservative	William Henry Parkinson JP	John Ellis	1918

=== No. 34 Allerton, Childwall and Little Woolton, 5 June 1918 ===
Caused by the death of Councillor Herbert Plant Harrison (Conservative, Allerton, Childwall and Little Woolton, elected 4 October 1916), on 27 March 1917

In his place Frederick Harrison, Major in the Liverpool Scottish Regiment of Eton Bank, Hornby Lane, Wavertree was appointed by the Council as a Councillor on 5 June 1918

No. 34 Allerton, Childwall and Little Woolton, 5 June 1918
Party	Former Councillor	Appointed Replacement	Term expires
Conservative	Herbert Plant Harrison	Major Frederick Harrison	1918

=== No. 15 Castle Street, 24 July 1918 ===
Caused by the death of Councillor John Edward Rayner (Conservative, Allerton, Childwall and Little Woolton, elected 1 November 1913).

In his place Frederick William Frodsham JP, of Cross Mount, Aughton, Ormskirk was appointed by the Council as a Councillor on 24 July 1918

No. 15 Castle Street, 24 July 1918
Party	Former Councillor	Appointed Replacement	Term expires
Conservative	John Edward Rayner	Frederick William Frodsham JP	1919

== See also ==
- Liverpool City Council
- Liverpool Town Council elections 1835 - 1879
- Liverpool City Council elections 1880–present
- Mayors and Lord Mayors of Liverpool 1207 to present
- History of local government in England
