= 1946 Liverpool City Council election =

1946 UK local election

- 1 November 1946
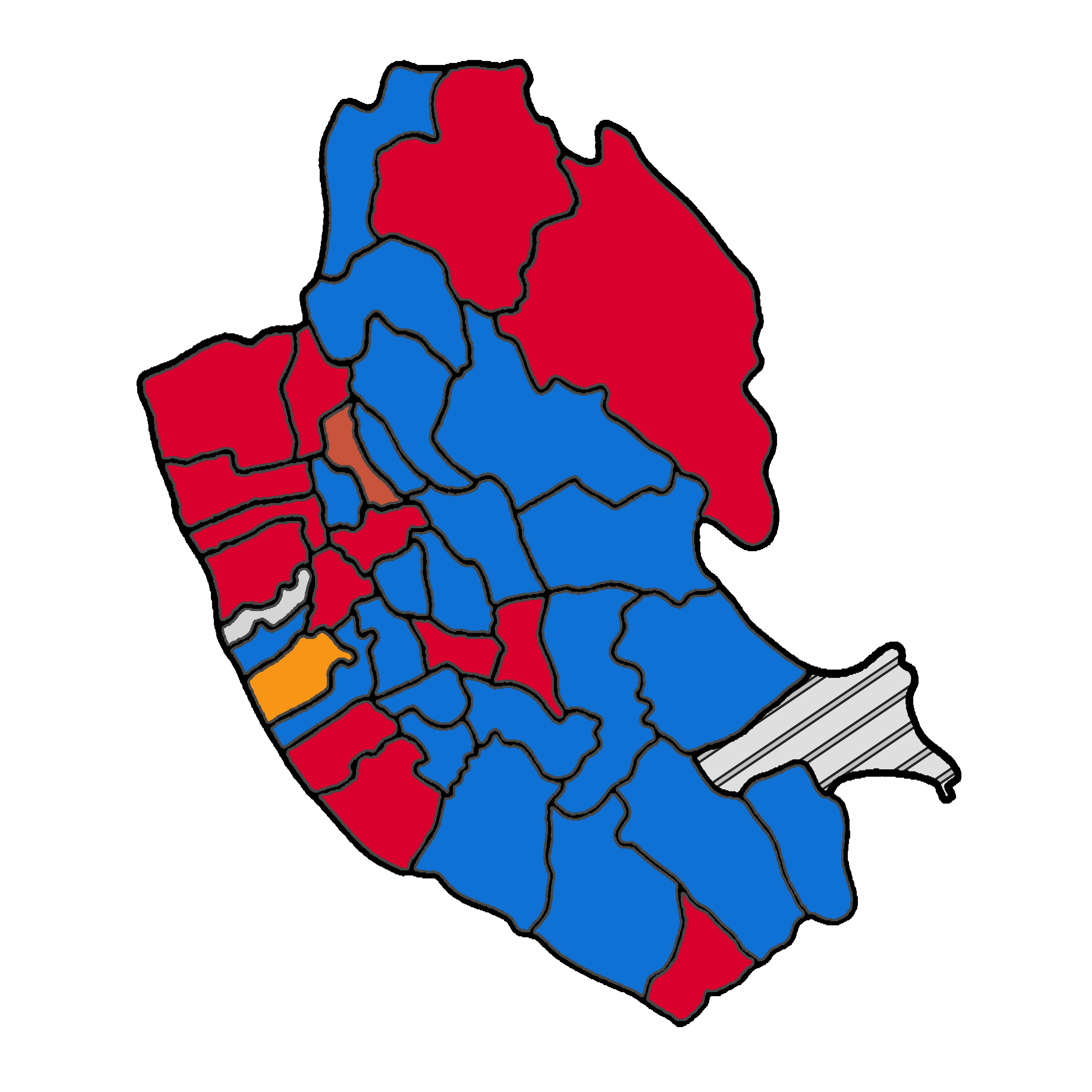
- Map of Liverpool showing wards won (first placed party)

Elections to Liverpool City Council were held on 1 November 1946.

After the election, the composition of the council was:

Party	Councillors	±	Aldermen	Total
Conservative	59	-4	24	83
Labour	50	+4	8	58
Protestant	5	--	1	6
Liberal	2	--	4	6
Independent	3	--	2	5

== Election result ==
Liverpool local election result 1946
Party	Seats	Gains	Losses	Net gain/loss	Seats %	Votes %	Votes	+/−
Conservative	22					51%	106,206	
Labour	14					45%	96,623	
Protestant	2					2.3%	4,890	
Independent	1					0.83%	1,729	
Liberal	1					0.91%	1,911	
Communist	0	0	0	0	0%	0.64%	1,342	

== Ward results ==
* - Councillor seeking re-election

^{(PARTY)} - Party of former Councillor

Due to the disruptions caused by the Second World War, no comparisons are made.

=== Abercromby ===
Abercromby
Party	Candidate	Votes	%	±%
Conservative	John Reginald Bevins	2,435	52%	
Labour	Richard Clitherow	2,279	48%	
Majority		156		
Registered electors		13,858		
Turnout		4,714	34%	

=== Aigburth ===
Aigburth
Party	Candidate	Votes	%	±%
Conservative	Vere Egerton Cotton	5,778	82%	
Labour	Eric Barnes	1,249	18%	
Majority		4,529		
Registered electors		16,530		
Turnout		7,027	43%	

=== Allerton ===
Allerton
Party	Candidate	Votes	%	±%
Conservative	John McMillan	3,211	64%	
Labour	Charles Chesworth	1,325	27%	
Liberal	William Henry Ledsom	459	9%	
Majority		1,886		
Registered electors		10,076		
Turnout		4,995	50%	

=== Anfield ===
Anfield
Party	Candidate	Votes	%	±%
Conservative	William John Harrop	4,672	60%	
Labour	John Christopher Caroll	3,151	40%	
Majority		1,521		
Registered electors		17,660		
Turnout		7,823	44%	

=== Breckfield ===
Breckfield
Party	Candidate	Votes	%	±%
Conservative	George William Prout	3,308	59%	
Labour	Peter Joseph Haines	2,306	41%	
Majority		1,002		
Registered electors		13,166		
Turnout		5,614	43%	

=== Brunswick ===
Brunswick
Party	Candidate	Votes	%	±%
Labour	Joseph Whitehead	2,377	81%	
Conservative	William Henry Bevan	411	14%	
Communist	Albert Southern	131	4.5%	
Majority		1,966		
Registered electors		7,593		
Turnout		2,919	38%	

=== Castle Street ===
Castle Street
Party	Candidate	Votes	%	±%
Conservative	Herbert Neville Bewley	unopposed		
Registered electors		892		

=== Childwall ===
Childwall
Party	Candidate	Votes	%	±%
Conservative	Jack Creswell	4,860	76%	
Labour	Thomas McConnell	1,535	24%	
Majority		3,325		
Registered electors		13,294		
Turnout		6,395	43%	

=== Croxteth ===
Croxteth
Party	Candidate	Votes	%	±%
Labour	Alfred Hargreaves	5,514	54%	
Conservative	John G. Morgan	4,238	41%	
Communist	John Coward	478	4.7%	
Majority		1,276		
Registered electors		30,938		
Turnout		10,230	33%	

=== Dingle ===
Dingle
Party	Candidate	Votes	%	±%
Labour	William Basil Cashin	4,035	51%	
Conservative	Edward Thomas White	3,877	49%	
Majority		158		
Registered electors		18,244		
Turnout		7,912	43%	

=== Edge Hill ===
Edge Hill
Party	Candidate	Votes	%	±%
Labour	Arthur Leadbetter	2,973	56%	
Conservative	Bertram Saul Morgan	2,125	40%	
Communist	Sidney Foster	172	3.2%	
Independent	Charles Henry Parry	23	0.43%	
Majority		848		
Registered electors		18,244		
Turnout		5,293	29%	

=== Everton ===
Everton
Party	Candidate	Votes	%	±%
Labour	David Nickson	3,165	66%	
Conservative	Joseph George Hatton	1,620	34%	
Majority		1,545		
Registered electors		13,629		
Turnout		4,785	35%	

=== Exchange ===
Exchange
Party	Candidate	Votes	%	±%
Independent	John Gerard Granby	648	73%	
Labour	Alfred Strange	228	26%	
Independent	Frederick Bowman	9	1%	
Majority		420		
Registered electors		1,589		
Turnout		885	56%	

=== Fairfield ===
Fairfield
Party	Candidate	Votes	%	±%
Conservative	Robert Meadows	3,912	57%	
Labour	Dorothy C. Keeling	2,973	43%	
Majority		939		
Registered electors		15,828		
Turnout		6,885	43%	

=== Fazakerley ===
Fazakerley
Party	Candidate	Votes	%	±%
Labour	Arthur J. Brownlow	4,404	53%	
Conservative	George Moore	3,929	47%	
Majority		475		
Registered electors		20,478		
Turnout		8,333	41%	

=== Garston ===
Garston
Party	Candidate	Votes	%	±%
Labour	Alex Hardman	3,584	57%	
Conservative	Victor C. Sutton	2,355	38%	
Independent	Arthur J.Holland	301	5%	
Majority		1,229		
Registered electors		16,027		
Turnout		6,240	39%	

=== Granby ===
Granby
Party	Candidate	Votes	%	±%
Conservative	Walter Clarke	2,457	50%	
Labour	William Tipping	2,435	50%	
Majority		22		
Registered electors		13,302		
Turnout		4,892	37%	

=== Great George ===
Great George - 2 seats
Party	Candidate	Votes	%	±%
Conservative	William George Ingham	827	56%	
Conservative	John Gwilyn Hughes	805	55%	
Labour	Alexander Kay	644	44%	
Labour	John Hamilton	632	43%	
Majority		183		
Registered electors		3,953		
Turnout		1,471	37%	

=== Kensington ===
Kensington
Party	Candidate	Votes	%	±%
Conservative	Frederick H. Bailey	3,117	52%	
Labour	Walter Gibbs	2,838	48%	
Majority		279		
Registered electors		14,505		
Turnout		5,955	41%	

=== Kirkdale ===
Kirkdale
Party	Candidate	Votes	%	±%
Labour	Isaac Richmond	3,986	56%	
Conservative	Joseph Trevor Booth	3,182	44%	
Majority		804		
Registered electors		19,580		
Turnout		7,168	37%	

=== Little Woolton ===
No election.

=== Low Hill ===
Low Hill
Party	Candidate	Votes	%	±%
Conservative	John Nuttall Maxwell Entwistle	2,502	51%	
Labour	William Dean-Jones	2,364	49%	
Majority		138		
Registered electors		12,372		
Turnout		4,866	39%	

=== Much Woolton ===
Much Woolton
Party	Candidate	Votes	%	±%
Conservative	Vivian Forsyth Crosthwaite	1,886	63%	
Labour	Griffith Daniel Ellis	1,128	37%	
Majority		758		
Registered electors		5,387		
Turnout		3,014	56%	

=== Netherfield ===
Netherfield
Party	Candidate	Votes	%	±%
Conservative and Protestant	Harry Victor Shaw	2,161	57%	
Labour	George Carmichael	1,634	43%	
Majority		527		
Registered electors		10,300		
Turnout		3,795	37%	

=== North Scotland ===
North Scotland
Party	Candidate	Votes	%	±%
Labour	Joseph O'Neill	2,140	83%	
Communist	Leo Joseph McGree	424	17%	
Majority		1,716		
Registered electors		7,187		
Turnout		2,564	36%	

=== Old Swan ===
Old Swan
Party	Candidate	Votes	%	±%
Conservative	Leslie Thomas Rogers	6,834	56%	
Labour	Clifford Selly	5,290	44%	
Majority		1,553		
Registered electors		28,456		
Turnout		12,133	43%	

=== Prince's Park ===
Prince's Park
Party	Candidate	Votes	%	±%
Conservative	William Browne	2,627	52%	
Labour	Mrs. Ethel May Wormald	2,416	48%	
Majority		211		
Registered electors		12,421		
Turnout		5,043	41%	

=== Sandhills ===
Sandhills
Party	Candidate	Votes	%	±%
Labour	Thomas Henry Dunford	2,076	74%	
Conservative	John Edward Molloy	715	26%	
Majority		1,361		
Registered electors		7,904		
Turnout		2,791	35%	

=== St. Anne's ===
St. Anne's
Party	Candidate	Votes	%	±%
Labour	Mrs. Sarah Anne McArd	1,138	59%	
Independent	John Larkin	780	41%	
Majority		358		
Registered electors		6,420		
Turnout		1,918	30%	

=== St. Domingo ===
St. Domingo
Party	Candidate	Votes	%	±%
Protestant	James Wareing	2,729	58%	
Labour	Walter Louis Cleaver	2,006	42%	
Majority		723		
Registered electors		13,428		
Turnout		4,735	35%	

=== St. Peter's ===
St. Peter's
Party	Candidate	Votes	%	±%
Liberal	Mrs Evaline Ida Bligh	370	69%	
Labour	Peter James O'Hare	166	31%	
Majority		204		
Registered electors		1,260		
Turnout		536	43%	

=== Sefton Park East ===
Sefton Park East
Party	Candidate	Votes	%	±%
Conservative	George Webster Armour	3,600	72%	
Labour	Robert Craig Smart	1,409	28%	
Majority		2,191		
Registered electors		14,664		
Turnout		5,009	34%	

=== Sefton Park West ===
Sefton Park West
Party	Candidate	Votes	%	±%
Conservative	George Walter Pickles	3,733	68%	
Labour	Thomas Scott	1,732	32%	
Majority		2,001		
Registered electors		11,104		
Turnout		5,465	49%	

=== South Scotland ===
South Scotland
Party	Candidate	Votes	%	±%
Labour	Frederick Ernest Granby	unopposed		
Registered electors		6,375		

=== Vauxhall ===
Vauxhall
Party	Candidate	Votes	%	±%
Labour	Patrick J. O'Brien	656	72%	
Conservative	Ernest Watkinson	258	28%	
Communist				
Majority		398		
Registered electors		2,637		
Turnout		914	35%	

=== Walton ===
Walton
Party	Candidate	Votes	%	±%
Conservative	Reginald Richard Bailey	5,490	54%	
Labour	Charles McDonald	4,689	46%	
Majority		801		
Registered electors		23,677		
Turnout		10,179	43%	

=== Warbreck ===
Warbreck
Party	Candidate	Votes	%	±%
Conservative	Arthur Whitaker Lowe	4,535	62%	
Labour	John Metcalf	2,795	38%	
Majority		1,740		
Registered electors		20,101		
Turnout		7,330	36%	

=== Wavertree ===
Wavertree
Party	Candidate	Votes	%	±%
Conservative	John Village	6,267	57%	
Labour	John F. Hughes	3,720	34%	
Liberal	Francis F.C. Moulton	1,082	10%	
Majority		2,547		
Registered electors		23,442		
Turnout		11,069	47%	

=== Wavertree West ===
Wavertree West
Party	Candidate	Votes	%	±%
Labour	Thomas Wallace	2,966	53%	
Conservative	Maurice Voss	2,545	45%	
Communist	Thomas McCann	137	2%	
Majority		421		
Registered electors		11,779		
Turnout		5,648	48%	

=== West Derby ===
West Derby
Party	Candidate	Votes	%	±%
Conservative	Charles William Wingrove	8,086	63%	
Labour	Edward William Harby	4,665	37%	
Majority		3,421		
Registered electors		32,400		
Turnout		12,751	39%	

== By-elections ==
=== Aigburth 28 November 1946 ===
On 9 November 1946 the aldermanic vacancy caused by the death of Alderman William Denton (???), Vere Egerton Cotton C.B.E. (Conservative, elected to the Aigburth ward on 1 November 1946) was elected as an Alderman.

Aigburth
Party	Candidate	Votes	%	±%
Conservative	William Latham Bateson	unopposed		
Registered electors		16,530		

=== Castle Street 4 February 1947 ===
Alderman John Case died on 1 December 1946.

On 8 January 1947 the Council elected Councillor Herbert Neville Bewley (Conservative ) as an Alderman.

Castle Street
Party	Candidate	Votes	%	±%
Conservative	Thomas Winlock Harley	411		
Liberal	Herbert Griffith Edwards	47		
Labour	Clifford Selly	15		
Majority		364		
Registered electors		892		
Turnout				

=== Garston 2 April 1947 ===
Alderman Sir Sydney Jones died on 16 February 1947.

The Councillor for Garston ward Councillor Joseph Williams (Conservative, last elected 1 November 1938) was elected by the Council as an Alderman on 5 March 1947 to fill the vacant post left by the death of Alderman Sir Sydney Jones (Liberal).

Garston
Party	Candidate	Votes	%	±%
Conservative	Henry Clarke	3,588	52.2%	
Labour	William Henry Sefton	3,279	47.7%	
Majority		309		
Registered electors		16,027		
Turnout		6,867	42.8%	
Conservative hold		Swing		

=== North Scotland 29 May 1947 ===
Caused by the resignation of Councillor Thomas Fay (Labour, elected 1 November 1945 ).

North Scotland
Party	Candidate	Votes	%	±%
Labour	Herbert Francis Granby	2,167		
	Richard Haddow Forrest	507		
Majority		1,660		
Registered electors		7,187		
Turnout		2,674	37.2	
Labour hold		Swing		
