= St. Domingo (Liverpool ward) =

Former ward of Liverpool City Council (UK)

- St. Domingo ward (1953) within Liverpool
- Registered Electors: 4,806 (1972 election)
- Metropolitan borough: City of Liverpool
- Metropolitan county: Merseyside
- Region: North West
- Country: England
- Sovereign state: United Kingdom
- UK Parliament: Liverpool Kirkdale

St. Domingo ward was an electoral division of Liverpool City Council between 1895 and 1972. It was within the Everton district of Liverpool.

== Background ==
The ward was first formed in 1895 and was merged with Breckfield ward in 1973.

=== 1895 boundaries ===
Liverpool City Council ward boundaries, which extended the area of the city and increased the number of wards from 16 to 28 were made prior to the 1895 election. St. Domingo was one of the newly created wards and was numbered as ward 23.

The Ward was within the Liverpool Kirkdale constituency from 1918 to 1950, and from 1950 to 1973 was within Liverpool Scotland.

=== 1953 boundaries ===
Liverpool City Council ward boundaries were changed prior to the 1953 election; St. Domingo ward was largely unchanged.

=== 1973 election ===
Following the Local Government Act 1972 the ward boundaries of the council were altered. The number of wards was reduced from 40 to 33 and the aldermanic system was abolished. St. Domingo ward was merged with Breckfield ward to form Breckfield St. Domingo ward.

== Councillors ==
Election	Councillor	Councillor	Councillor
1895	Joseph Colton (Con)	Robert Hampson (Con)	John Houlding (Con)
1895	Joseph Colton (Con)	Robert Hampson (Con)	Anthony Shelmerdine (Con)^{[a]}
1896	Joseph Colton (Con)	Robert Hampson (Con)	Anthony Shelmerdine (Con)
1897	Joseph Colton (Con)	Robert Hampson (Con)	Anthony Shelmerdine (Con)
1898	Joseph Colton (Con)	Robert Hampson (Con)	Anthony Shelmerdine (Con)
1899	Joseph Colton (Con)	Robert Hampson (Con)	Anthony Shelmerdine (Con)
1900	Joseph Colton (Con)	Robert Hampson (Con)	Anthony Shelmerdine (Con)
1901	Joseph Colton (Con)	Robert Hampson (Con)	Anthony Shelmerdine (Con)
1902	Joseph Colton (Con)	Robert Hampson (Con)	Anthony Shelmerdine (Con)
1903	Joseph Colton (Con)	William Gilbert (Protestant)	Anthony Shelmerdine (Con)
1904	Joseph Colton (Con)	William Gilbert (Protestant)	Henry Porter (Protestant)
1905	William Jones (Protestant)	William Gilbert (Protestant)	Henry Porter (Protestant)
1905	George Whittaker (Con)	William Gilbert (Protestant)	Henry Porter (Protestant)
1906	George Whittaker (Con)	Joseph Roby (Con)	Henry Porter (Protestant)
1907	George Whittaker (Con)	Joseph Roby (Con)	Charles Hill (Con)
1908	George Whittaker (Con)	Joseph Roby (Con)	Charles Hill (Con)
1909	George Whittaker (Con)	Joseph Roby (Con)	Charles Hill (Con)
1910	George Whittaker (Con)	Joseph Roby (Con)	Charles Hill (Con)
1911	James Stephenson (Lab)	Joseph Roby (Con)^{[b]}	Charles Hill (Con)
1912	James Stephenson (Lab)	William Moore (Con)	Charles Hill (Con)
1913	James Stephenson (Lab)	William Moore (Con)	Charles Hill (Con)
1914	Charles Wilson (Lab)	William Moore (Con)	William May (Con)^{[c]}
1919	Charles Wilson (Lab)	Thomas White (Con)	William May (Con)
1920	Charles Wilson (Lab)	Thomas White (Con)	William Backhouse (Con)
1921	Albert Clayton (Protestant)	Thomas White (Con)	William Backhouse (Con)
1922	Albert Clayton (Protestant)	Thomas White (Con)	William Backhouse (Con)
1923	Albert Clayton (Protestant)	Thomas White (Con)	William Backhouse (Con)
1924	Albert Clayton (Protestant)	Thomas White (Con)	William Backhouse (Con)
1925	Albert Clayton (Protestant)	Thomas White (Con)	William Backhouse (Con)
1926	Albert Clayton (Protestant)	Thomas White (Con)	William Backhouse (Con)
1927	John Hamilton (Lab)	Thomas White (Con)	William Backhouse (Con)
1928	John Hamilton (Lab)	Thomas White (Con)	William Backhouse (Con)
1929	John Hamilton (Lab)	Thomas White (Con)	William Backhouse (Con)
1930	Harry Longbottom (Protestant)	Thomas White (Con)	William Backhouse (Con)
1931	Harry Longbottom (Protestant)	vacant^{[d]}	William Backhouse (Con)
1931	Harry Longbottom (Protestant)	Charles Leftwich (Con)	William Backhouse (Con)
1932	Harry Longbottom (Protestant)	Charles Leftwich (Con)	Mary Jane Longbottom (Protestant)
1933	Harry Longbottom (Protestant)	Charles Leftwich (Con)	Mary Jane Longbottom (Protestant)
1934	Harry Longbottom (Protestant)	William Price (Protestant)	Mary Jane Longbottom (Protestant)
1935	Harry Longbottom (Protestant)^{[e]}	William Price (Protestant)	Mary Jane Longbottom (Protestant)
1935	George Henry Dunbar (Protestant)	William Price (Protestant)	Mary Jane Longbottom (Protestant)
1936	George Henry Dunbar (Protestant)	William Price (Protestant)	Mary Jane Longbottom (Protestant)
1937	George Henry Dunbar (Protestant)	William Price (Protestant)	Mary Jane Longbottom (Protestant)
1938	George Henry Dunbar (Protestant)	William Price (Protestant)	Mary Jane Longbottom (Protestant)
1945	Albert Harris (Protestant)	William Price (Protestant)	Mary Jane Longbottom (Protestant)
1946	Albert Harris (Protestant)	James Wareing (Protestant)	Mary Jane Longbottom (Protestant)
1947	Albert Harris (Protestant)	James Wareing (Protestant)	Mary Jane Longbottom (Protestant)
1949	Albert Harris (Protestant)	James Wareing (Protestant)	Mary Jane Longbottom (Protestant)
1950	Albert Harris (Protestant)	George Phipps (Protestant)	Mary Jane Longbottom (Protestant)
1951	Albert Harris (Protestant)	George Phipps (Protestant)	Mary Jane Longbottom (Protestant)
1952	Albert Harris (Protestant)	George Phipps (Protestant)	Mary Jane Longbottom (Protestant)
WARD REFORMED
1953	W.R. Maylor (Lab)	James Gardner (Lab)	F. Keating (Lab)
1954	W.R. Maylor (Lab)	James Gardner (Lab)	F. Keating (Lab)
1955	W.R. Maylor (Lab)	James Gardner (Lab)	F. Keating (Lab)
1956	W.R. Maylor (Lab)	James Gardner (Lab)	F. Keating (Lab)
1957	W.R. Maylor (Lab)	James Gardner (Lab)	F. Keating (Lab)
1958	W.R. Maylor (Lab)	James Gardner (Lab)	F. Keating (Lab)
1959	W.R. Maylor (Lab)	James Gardner (Lab)	F. Keating (Lab)
1960	Harry Longbottom (Protestant)	James Gardner (Lab)	F. Keating (Lab)
1961	Harry Longbottom (Protestant)	Ronald Henderson (Protestant)	F. Keating (Lab)
1962	F. Keating (Lab)^{[f]}	Ronald Henderson (Protestant)	J. Gardner (Lab)
1963	F. Keating (Lab)	Ronald Henderson (Protestant)	J. Gardner (Lab)
1964	F. Keating (Lab)	Frank Marsden (Lab)	J. Gardner (Lab)
1965	F. Keating (Lab)	Frank Marsden (Lab)	Ronald Henderson (Protestant)
1966	Harold Blower (Protestant)	Frank Marsden (Lab)	Ronald Henderson (Protestant)
1967	Harold Blower (Protestant)	Roy Hughes (Protestant)	Ronald Henderson (Protestant)
1968	Harold Blower (Protestant)	Roy Hughes (Protestant)	Ronald Henderson (Protestant)
1969	Harold Blower (Protestant)	Roy Hughes (Protestant)	Ronald Henderson (Protestant)
1970	Harold Blower (Protestant)	Roy Hughes (Protestant)	Ronald Henderson (Protestant)
1971	Harold Blower (Protestant)	Roy Hughes (Protestant)	C. McDonald (Lab)
1972	K. Jones (Lab)	Roy Hughes (Protestant)	C. McDonald (Lab)

indicates seat up for re-election after boundary changes.

indicates seat up for re-election.

indicates change in affiliation.

indicates seat up for re-election after casual vacancy.

=== Notes ===
a. Cllr John Houlding (Conservative, 1895) was elected as an alderman on 9 November 1895 and vacated his seat as a councillor.

b. Cllr Joseph Roby (Conservative, 1909) died on 23 July 1912.

c. Cllr Charles Hill (Conservative, 1913) died on 24 August 1914.

d. Cllr Sir Thomas White (Conservative, 1928) was elected as an alderman on 7 October 1931 thereby causing a vacancy to be filled at the ordinary election to be held on Sunday 1 November 1931.

e. Cllr Rev. Harry Dixon Longbottom was elected as an alderman on 9 November 1935 and vacated his seat as a councillor. A by-election was held on 12 December 1935.

f. Cllr Rev Harry Dixon Longbottom died in 1962. A double election was held on 10 May 1962, the incumbent F. Keating received the second highest number of votes and was returned for the vacant seat, facing re-election the following year.

== See also ==
- Liverpool City Council
- Liverpool City Council elections 1880–present
- Liverpool Town Council elections 1835 - 1879
