= North Scotland (Liverpool ward) =

Former ward in Liverpool

Coordinates: 53.4187°N 2.9825°W

North Scotland Ward
- Former ward
- Location within Merseyside
- OS grid reference: SJ352918
  - London: 178 mi (286 km) South
- Metropolitan borough: City of Liverpool
- Metropolitan county: Merseyside
- Region: North West
- Country: England
- Sovereign state: United Kingdom
- Post town: LIVERPOOL
- Postcode district: L5
- Dialling code: 0151
- Police: Merseyside
- Fire: Merseyside
- Ambulance: North West
- UK Parliament: Liverpool Scotland

North Scotland ward is a former electoral division in the City of Liverpool, England.

== History ==
North Scotland ward was established in 1895 as part of Liverpool’s evolving local government structure. It derived its name from the area surrounding Scotland Road, which was historically a densely populated and predominantly Irish district in north Liverpool.

The ward formed part of the Liverpool Scotland (UK Parliament constituency), which gained prominence for being represented by T. P. O'Connor, an Irish Nationalist MP, from 1885 until his death in 1929. This made it the only British constituency outside Ireland to consistently elect an Irish Nationalist.

The North Scotland ward ceased to exist following boundary changes in the mid-20th century, as Liverpool reorganised its electoral map to reflect population shifts and urban redevelopment.

== Geography ==
The ward covered parts of the Vauxhall area in north Liverpool, centered on Scotland Road and its adjoining streets. It was bordered by wards such as Vauxhall, Exchange, and other Scotland-related divisions. Historically, it was a working-class area with a strong Irish Catholic community and proximity to Liverpool’s docks.

== Legacy ==
Although the ward was dissolved, its history remains significant in Liverpool’s political and cultural narrative. The legacy of Irish influence and working-class activism in the area is still remembered, particularly in connection with Scotland Road and the constituency’s unique political history.

== Elections ==
=== 1919 ===
No. 2 North Scotland
Party	Candidate	Votes	%	±%
Irish Nationalist	John Clancy	unopposed		
Registered electors				
Irish Nationalist hold		Swing		

=== 1920 ===
No. 2 North Scotland
Party	Candidate	Votes	%	±%
Irish Nationalist	William John Loughrey	unopposed		
Registered electors				
Irish Nationalist hold		Swing		

=== 1921 ===
No. 2 North Scotland
Party	Candidate	Votes	%	±%
Irish Nationalist	James Bolger *	3,634	98%	
Liberal	Walter Henry Davies	85	2%	
Majority		3,549		
Registered electors		7,379		
Turnout		3,719	50%	
Irish Nationalist hold		Swing		

=== 1922 ===
No. 2 North Scotland
Party	Candidate	Votes	%	±%
Irish Nationalist	John Clancy *	2,499	55%	
Labour	Edward Campbell	2,011	45%	
Majority		488		
Registered electors		7,549		
Turnout		4,510	60%	
Irish Nationalist hold		Swing		

=== 1923 ===
No. 2 North Scotland
Party	Candidate	Votes	%	±%
Irish Nationalist	John Patrick Farrelly	2,412	51%	
Labour	Edward Campbell	2,283	49%	
Majority		129		
Registered electors		8,075		
Turnout		4,695	58%	
Irish Nationalist hold		Swing		

=== 1924 ===
No. 2 North Scotland
Party	Candidate	Votes	%	±%
Labour	David Gilbert Logan *	3,403	82%	
Irish Nationalist	Mrs. Elizabeth Geraghty	734	18%	
Majority		2,669		
Registered electors		8,178		
Turnout		4,137	51%	
Labour gain from Irish Nationalist		Swing		

=== 1925 ===
No. 2 North Scotland
Party	Candidate	Votes	%	±%
Catholic	Mgr. Thomas George	3,465	85%	
Labour	Richard McCann *	617	15%	
Independent	John Kearney	255	6%	
Majority		2,848		
Registered electors		8,121		
Turnout		4,082	50%	
Catholic gain from Labour		Swing		

=== 1926 ===
No. 2 North Scotland
Party	Candidate	Votes	%	±%
Labour	William Albert Robinson	2,328	57%	
Catholic	Rev. Thomas Joseph Rigby	1,780	43%	
Majority		548		
Registered electors		8,182		
Turnout		4,108	50%	
Labour gain from Irish Nationalist		Swing		

=== 1927 ===
No. 2 North Scotland
Party	Candidate	Votes	%	±%
Labour	David Gilbert Logan *	3,059	59%	
Catholic	James O'Hare	2,098	40%	
Independent Labour	Edward Campbell	30	1%	
Majority		961		
Registered electors		8,214		
Turnout		5,187	63%	
Labour hold		Swing		

=== 1928 ===
No. 2 North Scotland
Party	Candidate	Votes	%	±%
Labour	Patrick Fay	unopposed		
Registered electors				
Labour gain from Catholic		Swing		

=== 1929 ===
No. 2 North Scotland
Party	Candidate	Votes	%	±%
Labour	William Albert Robinson *	3,055	88%	
Conservative	William Hallett Hill	427	12%	
Majority		2,628		
Registered electors		8,931		
Turnout		3,482	39%	
Labour hold		Swing		

=== 1930 ===
No. 2 North Scotland
Party	Candidate	Votes	%	±%
Labour	Frederick William Tucker	1,985	82%	
Communist	Leo Joseph McGree	428	18%	
Majority		1,557		
Registered electors		8,605		
Turnout		2,413	28%	
Labour hold		Swing		

=== 1931 ===
No. 2 North Scotland
Party	Candidate	Votes	%	±%
Labour	Patrick Fay *	2,966	88%	
Communist	Leo Joseph McGree	412	12%	
Majority		2,554		
Registered electors		8,758		
Turnout		3,378	39%	
Labour hold		Swing		

=== 1932 ===
No. 2 North Scotland
Party	Candidate	Votes	%	±%
Labour	Mrs. Margaret Macfarlane	2,429	92%	
Communist	Leo Joseph McGree	206	7.8%	
Majority		2,223		
Registered electors				
Turnout		2,635		
Labour hold		Swing		

=== 1933 ===
No. 2 North Scotland
Party	Candidate	Votes	%	±%
Labour	Frederick William Tucker *	2,715	97%	
Communist	Wilfred Frederick Fielding	88	3%	
Majority		2,627		
Registered electors				
Turnout		2,803		
Labour hold		Swing		

=== 1934 ===
No. 2 North Scotland
Party	Candidate	Votes	%	±%
Labour	Patrick Fay	unopposed		
Registered electors		8,561		
Labour hold		Swing		

=== 1935 ===
No. 2 North Scotland
Party	Candidate	Votes	%	±%
Labour	Henry Gaskin	2,870	86%	
Independent	Mrs. Margaret Macfarlane *	465	14%	
Majority		2,405		
Registered electors		8,360		
Turnout		3,335	40%	
Labour hold		Swing		

=== 1936 ===
No. 2 North Scotland
Party	Candidate	Votes	%	±%
Labour	Frederick William Tucker *	unopposed		
Registered electors				
Labour hold		Swing		

=== 1937 ===
No. 2 North Scotland
Party	Candidate	Votes	%	±%
Labour	Patrick Fay *	unopposed		
Registered electors				
Labour hold		Swing		

=== 1938 ===
No. 2 North Scotland
Party	Candidate	Votes	%	±%
Labour	Patrick O'Brien *	unopposed		
Registered electors				
Labour hold		Swing		

=== 1945 ===
North Scotland - 2 seats
Party	Candidate	Votes	%	±%
Labour	Thomas Fay	1,690	63%	
Labour	Frederick W. Tucker	1,546	58%	
Communist	Leo McGree	981	37%	
Majority		709		
Registered electors		6,778		
Turnout		2,671	39%	

=== 1946 ===
North Scotland
Party	Candidate	Votes	%	±%
Labour	Joseph O'Neill	2,140	83%	
Communist	Leo Joseph McGree	424	17%	
Majority		1,716		
Registered electors		7,187		
Turnout		2,564	36%	

=== 1947 ===
North Scotland
Party	Candidate	Votes	%	±%
Labour	Frederick William Tucker	1,781	75%	
Conservative	John Kenneth Hart	416	18%	
Communist	John Coward	172	7%	
Majority		1,365		
Registered electors		7,237		
Turnout		2,369	33%	
Labour hold		Swing		

=== 1949 ===
North Scotland
Party	Candidate	Votes	%	±%
Labour	Herbert Francis Granby *	2,714	98%	+35%
Communist	John William Coward	43	2%	−35%
Majority		2,671		
Registered electors		7,276		
Turnout		2,757	38%	−1%
Labour hold		Swing	+35%	

=== 1950 ===
North Scotland
Party	Candidate	Votes	%	±%
Labour	Joseph O'Neil	1,585	98%	+23%
Communist	John William Coward	30	2%	−5%
Majority		1,585		
Registered electors		7,154		
Turnout		1,615	23%	−10%
Labour hold		Swing	+23%	

=== 1951 ===
North Scotland
Party	Candidate	Votes	%	±%
Labour	Frederick William Tucker *	1,634	63%	−12%
Independent	John Joseph Fay	930	36%	
Communist	John William Coward	18	1%	−6%
Majority		1,634		
Registered electors		7,185		
Turnout		2,582	36%	+3%
Labour hold		Swing	-12%	

=== 1952 ===
North Scotland
Party	Candidate	Votes	%	±%
Labour	Thomas Robinson ^{(PARTY)}			
Majority				
Registered electors		7,160		
Turnout				
Labour hold		Swing		

Boundaries were readjusted and North Scotland was deleted after 1952.
