= Much Woolton & Hunts Cross (Liverpool ward) =

Metropolitan borough council ward in England

Much Woolton & Hunts Cross Much Woolton (1918–1952)
- Much Woolton & Hunts Cross ward within Liverpool
- Population: 9,592 (2023 electorate)
- Metropolitan borough: City of Liverpool
- Metropolitan county: Merseyside
- Region: North West
- Country: England
- Sovereign state: United Kingdom
- UK Parliament: Liverpool Garston
- Councillors: Mirna Juarez (Lib Dem); Dave Aizlewood (Lib Dem)

Much Woolton and Hunts Cross ward is an electoral district of Liverpool City Council within the Liverpool Garston constituency.

== Background ==
=== 2023 ward ===
The ward was created for the elections held on 4 May 2023 following a 2022 review by the Local Government Boundary Commission for England, which decided that the previous 30 wards each represented by three Councillors should be replaced by 64 wards represented by 85 councillors with varying representation by one, two or three councillors per ward. The Much Woolton and Hunts Cross ward was created as a two-member ward from the south and eastern part of the former Allerton and Hunts Cross ward with portions of the former Woolton ward. The ward boundaries follow Allerton Road, High Street, Woolton Street, Acrefield Road, Hollytree Road, and to the North Liverpool Extension Line to Out Lane, Halewood Road, Macket's Lane, and thence in a straight line to the West Coast Mainline to its Junction with the Northern Line then along Hillfoot Road. The ward contains Woolton Village, Hunt's Cross, Camp Hill, and Hunts Cross railway station.

=== 1918 ward ===
The Much Woolton ward was created in 1918 covering the area of Woolton Village. This ward was removed in the 1953 rearrangement becoming part of the expanded Woolton ward.

== Councillors ==
Election	Councillor	Councillor	Councillor
AS MUCH WOOLTON
1918	John Hinshaw (Con)		
1919	John Hinshaw (Con)		
1920	John Hinshaw (Con)	Thomas Harrison (Con)	
1921	Robert Gladstone (NatLib)	Thomas Harrison (Con)	
1922	Robert Gladstone (NatLib)	Thomas Harrison (Con)	
1923	Robert Gladstone (NatLib)	John Reynolds (Con)	
1924	Robert Gladstone (Ind)	John Reynolds (Con)	
1925	Robert Gladstone (Ind)	John Reynolds (Con)	
1926	Robert Gladstone (Ind)	John Reynolds (Con)	
1927	William Napier (Con)	John Reynolds (Con)	
1928	William Napier (Con)	John Reynolds (Con)	
1929	William Napier (Con)	John Reynolds (Con)	Charles Pethick (Con)
1930	William Napier (Con)	John Reynolds (Con)	Charles Pethick (Con)
1931	William Napier (Con)	Herbert Bewley (Con)	Charles Pethick (Con)
1932	William Napier (Con)	Herbert Bewley (Con)	Caroline Whiteley (Ind)
1933	Joseph Butterfield (Con)	Herbert Bewley (Con)	Caroline Whiteley (Ind)
1934	Joseph Butterfield (Con)	Ernest Whiteley (Ind)	Caroline Whiteley (Ind)
1935	Joseph Butterfield (Con)	Ernest Whiteley (Ind)	Isaac Robinson (Con)
1935	Joseph Butterfield (Con)	Vivian Crosthwaite (Con)	Isaac Robinson (Con)
1936	Joseph Butterfield (Con)	Vivian Crosthwaite (Con)	Isaac Robinson (Con)
1937	Joseph Butterfield (Con)	Vivian Crosthwaite (Con)	Isaac Robinson (Con)
1938	Joseph Butterfield (Con)	Vivian Crosthwaite (Con)	Isaac Robinson (Con)
1939-1944: ELECTIONS WERE NOT HELD DUE TO THE SECOND WORLD WAR
1945	Reginald Stewart (Con)	Vivian Crosthwaite (Con)	Isaac Robinson (Con)
1946	Reginald Stewart (Con)	Vivian Crosthwaite (Con)	Isaac Robinson (Con)
1947	Reginald Stewart (Con)	Vivian Crosthwaite (Con)	Isaac Robinson (Con)
1949	Reginald Stewart (Con)	Vivian Crosthwaite (Con)	Isaac Robinson (Con)
1950	Reginald Stewart (Con)	Vivian Crosthwaite (Con)	Isaac Robinson (Con)
1951	Reginald Stewart (Con)	Vivian Crosthwaite (Con)	Joseph Norton (Con)
1952	Reginald Stewart (Con)	Vivian Crosthwaite (Con)	Joseph Norton (Con)
1953-2023 WARD DISESTABLISHED
2023	Mirna Juarez (LD)	Dave Aizlewood (LD)	

indicates seat up for re-election after boundary changes.

indicates seat up for re-election.

indicates change in affiliation.

indicates seat up for re-election after casual vacancy.

== Election results ==
=== Elections of the 2020s ===
2025 byelection

=== Much Woolton & Hunts Cross ===
Much Woolton & Hunts Cross (2 seats)
Party	Candidate	Votes	%	±%
Liberal Democrats	Mirna Juarez *	1,933	59.51	N/A
Liberal Democrats	Dave Aizlewood	1,562	48.09	N/A
Labour	Elizabeth Smith	1,132	34.85	N/A
Labour	Carol Sung *	843	25.95	N/A
Green	Maggi Williams	383	11.79	N/A
Conservative	Denise Mary Nuttall	161	4.96	N/A
Majority		430		N/A
Registered electors		9,592		
Turnout		3,258	33.97	N/A
Rejected ballots		10		N/A
Liberal Democrats win (new seat)				
Liberal Democrats win (new seat)				

Much Woolton & Hunts Cross voter photo ID data
Voters initially refused a ballot paper	11
Voters who returned with accepted ID	5
Voters who did not return to vote	6

Mirna Juarez was an outgoing councillor for the pre-2023 Allerton and Hunts Cross ward.

Carol Sung (Labour) was an outgoing councillor for the pre-2023 Croxteth ward, serving between 2021 and 2023, and prior to that a councillor for Tuebrook and Stoneycroft between 2015 and 2019.
