= 1951 Liverpool City Council election =

1951 UK local election

← 1950	11 May 1951	1952 →
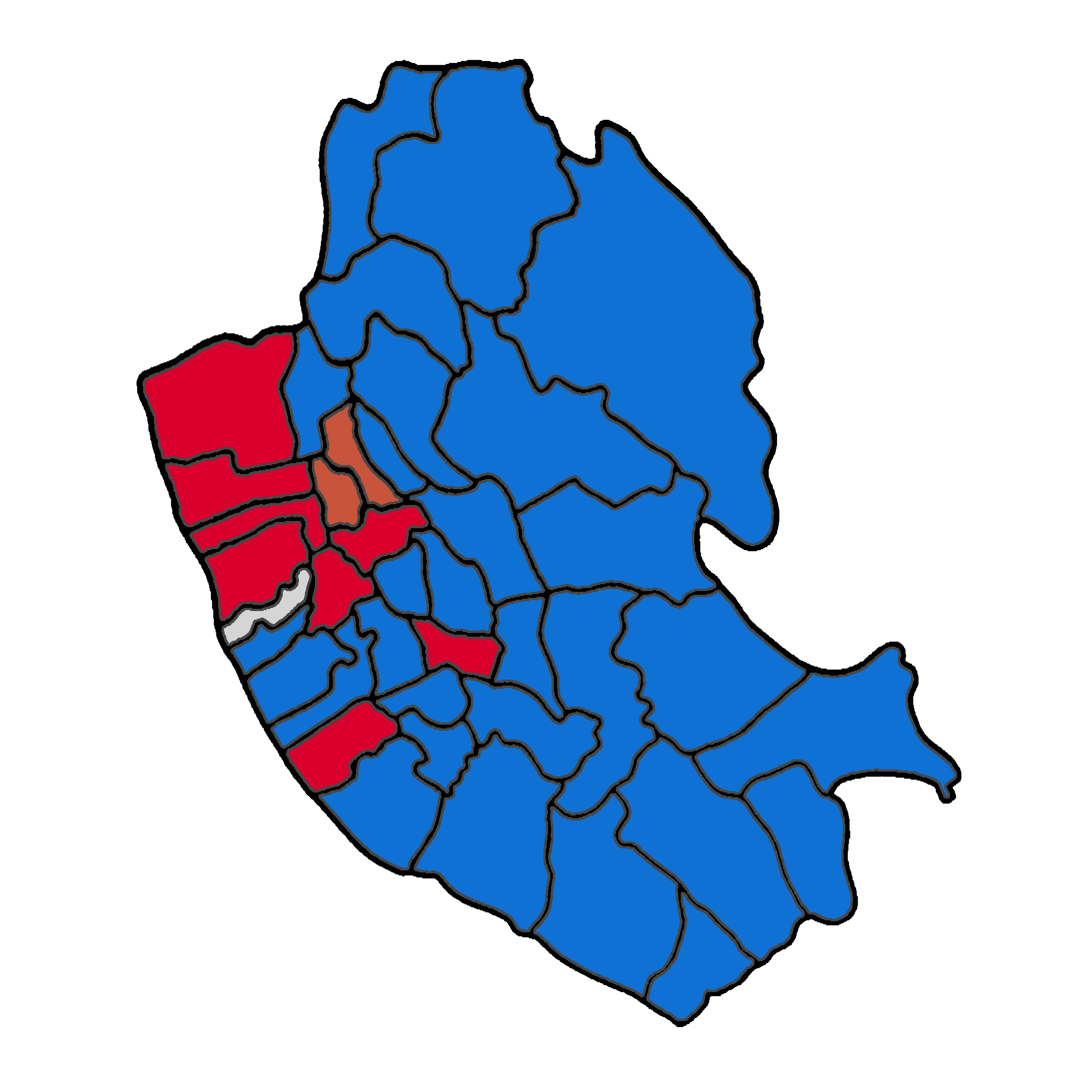
- Map of Liverpool showing wards won (first placed party)

Elections to Liverpool City Council were held on Thursday 11 May 1951.

After the election, the composition of the council was:

Party	Councillors	±	Aldermen
Conservative	??	??	??
Labour	??	??	??
Protestant	??	??	??
Liberal	??	??	??

== Election result ==
Liverpool local election result 1951
Party	Seats	Gains	Losses	Net gain/loss	Seats %	Votes %	Votes	+/−
Conservative	28				68%	58%	120,053	
Labour	10				24%	38%	79,531	
Protestant	2				5%	2%	4,230	
Independent	1				2.4%	0.31%	646	
Liberal	0	0	0	0	0%	0.47%	964	
Communist	0	0	0	0	0%	0.065%	134	

== Ward results ==
* - Councillor seeking re-election

^{(PARTY)} - Party of former Councillor

The terms of office expired in 1951 for those councillors who were elected in November 1947. Therefore comparisons are made with the 1947 election results.

=== Abercromby ===
Abercromby
Party	Candidate	Votes	%	±%
Conservative	Francis Joseph Bullen *	2,740	53%	−1%
Labour	William Smyth	2,391	47%	+1%
Majority		349		
Registered electors		13,488		
Turnout		5,131	38%	−3%
Conservative hold		Swing		

=== Aigburth ===
Aigburth
Party	Candidate	Votes	%	±%
Conservative	Herbert Mylrea Allen *	5,842	83%	0%
Liberal	William Edward Oates	600	9%	
Labour	Roy Stoddart	565	8%	−9%
Majority		5,267		
Registered electors		15,607		
Turnout		6,997	45%	−13%
Conservative hold		Swing		

=== Allerton ===
Allerton
Party	Candidate	Votes	%	±%
Conservative	Mrs. Margaret Jane Strong *	3,068	76%	+8%
Labour	William Rice-Jones	615	15%	−8%
Liberal	Mrs. Helena France	364	9%	
Majority		2,453		
Registered electors		9,583		
Turnout		4,047	42%	−15%
Conservative hold		Swing		

=== Anfield ===
Anfield
Party	Candidate	Votes	%	±%
Conservative	Albert James White *	4,698	68%	−4%
Labour	Walter Richard Maylor	2,181	32%	−4%
Majority		2,517		
Registered electors		16,560		
Turnout		6,879	42%	53%
Conservative hold		Swing		

=== Breckfield ===
Breckfield
Party	Candidate	Votes	%	±%
Conservative	David John Lewis *	3,100	66%	+6%
Labour	Terence Roberts	1,621	34%	−6%
Majority		1,479		
Registered electors		12,893		
Turnout		4,721	37%	−14%
Conservative hold		Swing		

=== Brunswick ===
Brunswick
Party	Candidate	Votes	%	±%
Labour	Frank Hampton Cain *	1,982	77%	−2%
Conservative	Mrs. Marrion Browne	582	23%	−1%
Majority		1,400		
Registered electors		7,546		
Turnout		2,564	34%	+10%
Labour hold		Swing		

=== Castle Street ===
Castle Street
Party	Candidate	Votes	%	±%
Conservative	Reginald Poole ^{(PARTY)}	499	98%	
Labour	Thomas McNerney	11	2%	
Majority		488		
Registered electors		922		
Turnout		510	55%	
Conservative hold		Swing		

=== Childwall ===
Childwall
Party	Candidate	Votes	%	±%
Conservative	Alexander Young *	4,748	86%	−4%
Labour	Mrs. Eleanor Elizabeth Wright	766	14%	−4%
Majority		3,982		
Registered electors		13,476		
Turnout		5,514	41%	−14%
Conservative hold		Swing		

=== Croxteth ===
Croxteth
Party	Candidate	Votes	%	±%
Labour	Sydney Smart *	6,595	51%	0%
Conservative	Charles McDonald	6,346	49%	−2%
Majority		249		
Registered electors		34,017		
Turnout		12,941	38%	−1%
Conservative hold		Swing		

=== Dingle ===
Dingle
Party	Candidate	Votes	%	±%
Conservative	Stanley Airey ^{(PARTY)}	4,470	51%	+3%
Labour	Lewis Charles Edwards	4,344	49%	−3%
Majority		126		
Registered electors		17,840		
Turnout		8,814	49%	−1%
Conservative hold		Swing		

=== Edge Hill ===
Edge Hill
Party	Candidate	Votes	%	±%
Labour	John Bagot *	2,283	52%	−2%
Conservative	William Thomas	2,129	48%	+2%
Majority		154		
Registered electors		13,599		
Turnout		4,412	32%	−7%
Labour hold		Swing		

=== Everton ===
Everton
Party	Candidate	Votes	%	±%
Labour	John Braddock *	2,670	58%	0%
Conservative	Ernest Johnson	1,970	42%	0%
Majority		700		
Registered electors		13,213		
Turnout		4,640	35%	−4%
Labour hold		Swing	0%	

=== Exchange ===
Exchange
Party	Candidate	Votes	%	±%
Independent	Walter McGrath *	646	74%	−5%
Labour	John Cullen	226	26%	+5%
Majority		420		
Registered electors		1,656		
Turnout		872	53%	−2%
Independent hold		Swing	-5%	

=== Fairfield ===
Fairfield
Party	Candidate	Votes	%	±%
Conservative	Robert Nash *	4,071	67%	−1%
Labour	William Indcox Davies	2,028	33%	+1%
Majority		2,043		
Registered electors		15,494		
Turnout		6,099	39%	−12%
Conservative hold		Swing	-1%	

=== Fazakerley ===
Fazakerley
Party	Candidate	Votes	%	±%
Conservative	Kenneth Pugh Thompson M.P. *	5,288	54%	0%
Labour	James Gardner	4,523	46%	0%
Majority		765		
Registered electors		19,900		
Turnout		9,811	49%	−2%
Conservative hold		Swing	0%	

=== Garston ===
Garston
Party	Candidate	Votes	%	±%
Conservative	Henry Clarke *	4,958	55%	+1%
Labour	William Henry Sefton	4,038	45%	−1%
Majority		920		
Registered electors		19,796		
Turnout		8,996	45%	−12%
Conservative hold		Swing	+1%	

=== Granby ===
Granby
Party	Candidate	Votes	%	±%
Conservative	James Edward Thompson *	2,742	55%	0%
Labour	Mrs. Elizabeth Trainor	2,225	45%	0%
Majority		517		
Registered electors		12,869		
Turnout		4,967	39%	−4%
Conservative hold		Swing		

=== Great George ===
Great George
Party	Candidate	Votes	%	±%
Conservative	John James Coupland ^{(PARTY)}	920	57%	+2%
Labour	Thomas George Dominic Maguire	686	43%	−2%
Majority		234		
Registered electors		3,360		
Turnout		1,606	48%	+1%
Conservative hold		Swing		

=== Kensington ===
Kensington
Party	Candidate	Votes	%	±%
Conservative	Harold William Hughes *	3,235	57%	+1%
Labour	Frederick Walker	2,476	43%	−1%
Majority		759		
Registered electors		14,074		
Turnout		5,711	41%	−9%
Conservative hold		Swing		

=== Kirkdale ===
Kirkdale
Party	Candidate	Votes	%	±%
Conservative	Edward Shaw	3,666	51%	+3%
Labour	John Francis Carr *	3,564	49%	−3%
Majority		102		
Registered electors		19,710		
Turnout		7,230	37%	−9%
Conservative gain from Labour		Swing	+3%	

=== Little Woolton ===
Little Woolton
Party	Candidate	Votes	%	±%
Conservative	Gordon Frederick Catlin *	1,257	68%	−16%
Labour	Francis Burke	603	32%	+18%
Majority		654		
Registered electors		3,047		
Turnout		1,860	61%	−7%
Conservative hold		Swing	-16%	

=== Low Hill ===
Low Hill
Party	Candidate	Votes	%	±%
Conservative	Samuel Cecil Saltmarsh *	3,005	55%	0%
Labour	Charles Morris	2,465	45%	0%
Majority		540		
Registered electors		12,003		
Turnout		5,470	46%	−3%
Conservative hold		Swing		

=== Much Woolton ===
Much Woolton
Party	Candidate	Votes	%	±%
Conservative	Joseph Norton ^{(PARTY)}	2,399	82%	+8%
Labour	Alan Frank Skinner	523	18%	−8%
Majority		1,876		
Registered electors		6,367		
Turnout		2,922	46%	−8%
Conservative hold		Swing	+8%	

=== Netherfield ===
Netherfield
Party	Candidate	Votes	%	±%
Protestant	George Edward Lewis *	1,878	67%	+4%
Labour	Thomas Robinson	926	33%	−4%
Majority		952		
Registered electors		10,134		
Turnout		2,804	28%	+9%
Protestant hold		Swing	+4%	

=== North Scotland ===
North Scotland
Party	Candidate	Votes	%	±%
Labour	Frederick William Tucker *	1,634	63%	−12%
Independent	John Joseph Fay	930	36%	
Communist	John William Coward	18	1%	−6%
Majority		1,634		
Registered electors		7,185		
Turnout		2,582	36%	+3%
Labour hold		Swing	-12%	

=== Old Swan ===
Old Swan
Party	Candidate	Votes	%	±%
Conservative	Alfred Nathaniel Bates *	7,279	71%	+5%
Labour	Joseph Mooney	3,028	29%	−5%
Majority		4,251		
Registered electors		27,217		
Turnout		10,307	38%	−11%
Conservative hold		Swing	+5%	

=== Prince's Park ===
Prince's Park
Party	Candidate	Votes	%	±%
Conservative	Charles Cowlin *	2,690	56%	+1%
Labour	Thomas McManus	2,118	44%	−1%
Majority		572		
Registered electors		11,977		
Turnout		4,808	40%	−10%
Conservative hold		Swing	+1%	

=== Sandhills ===
Sandhills
Party	Candidate	Votes	%	±%
Labour	Stanley Part *	2,332	75%	+2%
Conservative	Leonard James Carr	790	25%	−2%
Majority		1,542		
Registered electors		8,160		
Turnout		3,122	38%	−3%
Labour hold		Swing	+2%	

=== St. Anne's ===
St. Anne's
Party	Candidate	Votes	%	±%
Labour	Abraham Louis Caplan *	1,242	73%	+11%
Conservative	Frank Scott	467	27%	+6%
Majority		775		
Registered electors		5,537		
Turnout		1,709	31%	−12%
Labour hold		Swing	+11%	

=== St. Domingo ===
St. Domingo
Party	Candidate	Votes	%	±%
Protestant	Mrs. Mary Jane Longbottom *	2,352	65%	+5%
Labour	Frank Keating	1,281	35%	−5%
Majority		1,281		
Registered electors		13,257		
Turnout		3,633	27%	−15%
Protestant hold		Swing	+5%	

=== St. Peter's ===
St. Peter's
Party	Candidate	Votes	%	±%
Conservative	James William Brown *	457	59%	−11%
Labour	Mrs. Elsie Ellen Gough	323	41%	+11%
Majority		134		
Registered electors		1,437		
Turnout		780	54%	+8%
Conservative hold		Swing	-11%	

=== Sefton Park East ===
Sefton Park East
Party	Candidate	Votes	%	±%
Conservative	Walter Isaac Throssell *	3,877	74%	0%
Labour	Matthew John Grimes	1,337	26%	0%
Majority		2,540		
Registered electors		14,249		
Turnout		5,214	37%	−5%
Conservative hold		Swing	0%	

=== Sefton Park West ===
Sefton Park West
Party	Candidate	Votes	%	±%
Conservative	Frederick Bidston *	3,744	75%	−3%
Labour	Keith Samuel Williams	1,265	25%	+3%
Majority		2,479		
Registered electors		10,825		
Turnout		5,009	46%	−5%
Conservative hold		Swing	-3%	

=== South Scotland ===
South Scotland - 2 seats
Party	Candidate	Votes	%	±%
Labour	John Sheehan *	1,471	92%	
Labour	David Cowley	1,465	91%	
Communist	Richard Cuerdon	134	8%	
Majority		1,471		
Registered electors		6,670		
Turnout		1,605	24%	
Labour hold		Swing		
Labour hold		Swing		

=== Vauxhall ===
Vauxhall
Party	Candidate	Votes	%	±%
Labour	Joseph Cyril Brady *	666	69%	0%
Conservative	William Alfred Manley Crawford	306	31%	0%
Majority		360		
Registered electors		2,827		
Turnout		972	34%	−16%
Labour hold		Swing	0%	

=== Walton ===
Walton
Party	Candidate	Votes	%	±%
Conservative	Mrs Mary Elizabeth Jones *	5,584	65%	+5%
Labour	William Dean-Jones	2,984	35%	−5%
Majority		2,600		
Registered electors		23,104		
Turnout		8,568	37%	−15%
Conservative hold		Swing	+5%	

=== Warbreck ===
Warbreck
Party	Candidate	Votes	%	±%
Conservative	Donald Francis Brady ^{(PARTY)}	5,161	70%	−1%
Labour	William Delgarno	2,234	30%	+1%
Majority		2,927		
Registered electors		18,861		
Turnout		7,395	39%	−8%
Conservative hold		Swing	-1%	

=== Wavertree ===
Wavertree
Party	Candidate	Votes	%	±%
Conservative	Edward Jennings ^{(PARTY)}	6,321	74%	+1%
Labour	Thomas Henry Maloney	1,507	18%	−9%
Liberal	Albert Edward Jones	729	9%	
Majority		4,814		
Registered electors		21,976		
Turnout		8,557	39%	−12%
Conservative hold		Swing	+1%	

=== Wavertree West ===
Wavertree West
Party	Candidate	Votes	%	±%
Conservative	John Keenan ^{(PARTY)}	2,993	55%	0%
Labour	Charles James Minton	2,418	45%	0%
Majority		575		
Registered electors		11,506		
Turnout		5,411	47%	−7%
Conservative hold		Swing	0%	

=== West Derby ===
West Derby
Party	Candidate	Votes	%	±%
Conservative	Hedley Arthur Williams *	8,661	72%	+3%
Labour	George Henry Dunbar	3,384	28%	−3%
Majority		5,277		
Registered electors		31,415		
Turnout		12,045	38%	−13%
Conservative hold		Swing	+3%	

== By-elections ==
=== North Scotland 22 November 1951 ===
Following the disqualification of Herbert Francis Granby (elected 12 May 1949) there was a By-election for the North Scotland ward on 22 November 1951.

North Scotland
Party	Candidate	Votes	%	±%
Labour	Leonard James Carr	1,527	87%	
Conservative	Thomas Robinson	234	13%	
Majority		1,293		
Registered electors		7,185		
Turnout		1,761	25%	
Labour hold		Swing		
