= Sefton Park (Liverpool ward) =

Metropolitan borough council ward in England

Sefton Park Sefton Park West (1899–1952)
- Sefton Park ward within Liverpool
- Population: 4,188 (2023 electorate)
- Metropolitan borough: City of Liverpool
- Metropolitan county: Merseyside
- Region: North West
- Country: England
- Sovereign state: United Kingdom
- UK Parliament: Liverpool Wavertree
- Councillors: John Howard (Green)

Sefton Park ward is an electoral district of Liverpool City Council within the Liverpool Wavertree constituency. The ward includes, and is named for, Sefton Park, and part of the district of the same name.

== Background ==
=== 1895 boundaries ===
The ward was created in 1895 to accommodate the expanding city. In 1899 the ward was renamed as Sefton Park West with the Sefton Park East ward created at the same time.

=== 2023 boundaries ===
The ward was re-created for the elections held on 4 May 2023 following a 2022 review by the Local Government Boundary Commission for England, which decided that the previous 30 wards each represented by three Councillors should be replaced by 64 wards represented by 85 councillors with varying representation by one, two or three councillors per ward. The Sefton Park ward was re-created as a single-member ward from the northern half of the former St Michael's ward, with small sections of the former Princes Park and Mossley Hill wards. The ward boundaries follow Croxteth Gate, Mossley Hill Drive, Elmswood Road, Aigburth Vale, Aigburth Road, and Ullet Road.

== Councillors ==
Election	Councillor	Councillor	Councillor
1895	Richard Dart (Con)	Augustus Frederick Warr (Con)	Francis Henderson (Con)
1896	Richard Dart (Con)	Augustus Frederick Warr (Con)	Francis Henderson (Con)
1897	Richard Dart (Con)	Augustus Frederick Warr (Con)	Francis Henderson (Con)
1898	Richard Dart (Con)	Radcliffe William Smith (Con)	Francis Henderson (Con)
RENAMED SEFTON PARK WEST
1899	Richard Dart (Con)	Radcliffe William Smith (Con)	Thomas Stanley Rogerson (Con)
1900	Richard Dart (Con)	Herbert Reynolds Rathbone (Lib)	Thomas Stanley Rogerson (Con)
1901	Richard Dart (Con)	Herbert Reynolds Rathbone (Lib)	Thomas Stanley Rogerson (Con)
1902	Richard Dart (Con)	Herbert Reynolds Rathbone (Lib)	Thomas Stanley Rogerson (Con)
1903	Richard Dart (Con)	Herbert Reynolds Rathbone (Lib)	Thomas Stanley Rogerson (Con)
1904	Richard Dart (Con)	Herbert Reynolds Rathbone (Lib)	Joseph Wilson (Lib)
1905	Richard Dart (Con)	Herbert Reynolds Rathbone (Lib)	Joseph Wilson (Lib)
1906	Richard Dart (Con)	Herbert Reynolds Rathbone (Lib)	Joseph Wilson (Lib)
1907	Richard Dart (Con)	Herbert Reynolds Rathbone (Lib)	Fred Pritchard (Con)
1908	Richard Dart (Con)	Herbert Reynolds Rathbone (Lib)	Fred Pritchard (Con)
1909	Richard Dart (Con)	Herbert Reynolds Rathbone (Lib)	Fred Pritchard (Con)
1910	Richard Dart (Con)	Herbert Reynolds Rathbone (Lib)	Frank Campbell Wilson (Lib)
1911	Ernest Cranstoun Given (Con)	Herbert Reynolds Rathbone (Lib)	Frank Campbell Wilson (Lib)
1912	Ernest Cranstoun Given (Con)	Herbert Reynolds Rathbone (Lib)	Frank Campbell Wilson (Lib)
1913	Ernest Cranstoun Given (Con)	Herbert Reynolds Rathbone (Lib)	Frank Campbell Wilson (Lib)
1914	Ernest Cranstoun Given (Con)	Herbert Reynolds Rathbone (Lib)	Frank Campbell Wilson (Lib)
1918	Mabel Fletcher (Con)	Herbert Reynolds Rathbone (Lib)	Frank Campbell Wilson (Lib)
1919	Mabel Fletcher (Con)	Herbert Reynolds Rathbone (Lib)	Frank Campbell Wilson (Lib)
1919	Mabel Fletcher (Con)	? (Lib)	Frank Campbell Wilson (Lib)
1920	Mabel Fletcher (Con)	? (Lib)	Frank Campbell Wilson (Lib)
1921	Mabel Fletcher (Con)	? (Lib)	Frank Campbell Wilson (Lib)
1922	Mabel Fletcher (Con)	Herbert Reynolds Rathbone (Lib)	Frank Campbell Wilson (Lib)
1923	Mabel Fletcher (Con)	Herbert Reynolds Rathbone (Lib)	Frank Campbell Wilson (Lib)
1924	Mabel Fletcher (Con)	Herbert Reynolds Rathbone (Lib)	Frank Campbell Wilson (Lib)
1925	Mabel Fletcher (Con)	James Graham Reece (Con)	Frank Campbell Wilson (Lib)
1926	Mabel Fletcher (Con)	James Graham Reece (Con)	Frank Campbell Wilson (Lib)
1927	Mabel Fletcher (Con)	James Graham Reece (Con)	Frank Campbell Wilson (Lib)
1927	Mabel Fletcher (Con)	James Graham Reece (Con)	Ronald Percy Clayton (Con)
1928	Mabel Fletcher (Con)	James Graham Reece (Con)	Ronald Percy Clayton (Con)
1929	Mabel Fletcher (Con)	James Graham Reece (Con)	Ronald Percy Clayton (Con)
1930	Walter Thomas Lancashire (Con)	James Graham Reece (Con)	Ronald Percy Clayton (Con)
1931	Walter Thomas Lancashire (Con)	James Graham Reece (Con)	Ronald Percy Clayton (Con)
1932	Walter Thomas Lancashire (Con)	James Graham Reece (Con)	Ronald Percy Clayton (Con)
1933	Walter Thomas Lancashire (Con)	James Graham Reece (Con)	Ronald Percy Clayton (Con)
1934	Walter Thomas Lancashire (Con)	James Graham Reece (Con)	Ronald Percy Clayton (Con)
1935	Walter Thomas Lancashire (Con)	James Graham Reece (Con)	William James Austin (Con)
1936	Walter Thomas Lancashire (Con)	James Graham Reece (Con)	William James Austin (Con)
1937	Walter Thomas Lancashire (Con)	James Graham Reece (Con)	William James Austin (Con)
1938	Walter Thomas Lancashire (Con)	James Graham Reece (Con)	Alexander Maver Finlayson (Con)
1940	Walter Thomas Lancashire (Con)	? (Con)	Alexander Maver Finlayson (Con)
1944	Arthur Brierley Collins (Con)	? (Con)	Alexander Maver Finlayson (Con)
1945	Arthur Brierley Collins (Con)	? (Con)	Frederick Bidston (Con)
1946	Arthur Brierley Collins (Con)	George Walter Pickles (Con)	Frederick Bidston (Con)
1947	Arthur Brierley Collins (Con)	George Walter Pickles (Con)	Frederick Bidston (Con)
1949	Arthur Brierley Collins (Con)	George Walter Pickles (Con)	Frederick Bidston (Con)
1950	Arthur Brierley Collins (Con)	George Walter Pickles (Con)	Frederick Bidston (Con)
1951	Arthur Brierley Collins (Con)	George Walter Pickles (Con)	Frederick Bidston (Con)
1952	Arthur Brierley Collins (Con)	George Walter Pickles (Con)	Frederick Bidston (Con)
1953-2022 WARD DISESTABLISHED
2023	John Howard (Green)		
2025	Katie Joanna Jarman (Green)		

indicates seat up for re-election after boundary changes.

indicates seat up for re-election.

indicates change in affiliation.

indicates seat up for re-election after casual vacancy.

== Election results ==
=== Elections of the 2020s ===
4th May 2023
Party	Candidate	Votes	%	±%
Green	John David Howard	760	56.80	
Labour	Jim Davies	449	33.56	
Liberal Democrats	Jane Francesca Westcott	69	5.16	
Conservative	Pauline Dougherty	60	4.48	
Majority		311	23.24	
Turnout		1,338	31.95	
Rejected ballots		7	0.52	
Total ballots		1,345	32.12	
Registered electors		4,188		
Green win (new seat)				

17th July 2025
Party	Candidate	Votes	%	±%
Green	Katie Joanna Jarman	468	49.79	− 7
Labour	Connor William Campbell	211	22.45	− 11.1
Liberal Democrats	Tristan Mark Paul	193	20.53	+ 15.4
Reform	Harry Glen Gallimore-King	54	5.74	N/A
Conservative	Marc Francois d'Abbadie	14	1.49	− 3
Majority		257	27.34	+ 4.1
Turnout		940	22.75	− 9.2
Rejected ballots		7	0.73	+ 0.2
Total ballots		947	22.75	
Registered electors		4,162		
Green hold		Swing	7.01	

=== Elections of the 1890s ===
Thursday 1 November 1898
Party	Candidate	Votes	%	±%
Conservative	Francis Henderson	unopposed		
Registered electors				
Conservative hold		Swing		

By-election: Tuesday 18 October 1898
Party	Candidate	Votes	%	±%
Conservative	Radcliffe William Smith	unopposed		
Registered electors		4,366		
Conservative hold		Swing		

The by-election was held on 18 October 1898 and was caused by the resignation of Councillor Augustus Frederick Warr MP, which was reported to the council on 5 October 1898.

Thursday 1 November 1897
Party	Candidate	Votes	%	±%
Conservative	Augustus Frederick Warr MP	1,413	56%	
Liberal	John Morris	1,094	44%	
Majority		319		
Registered electors		4,366		
Turnout		2,507	57%	
Conservative hold		Swing		

Monday 2 November 1896
Party	Candidate	Votes	%	±%
Conservative	Richard Dart	unopposed		
Registered electors				
Conservative hold		Swing		

Thursday 1 November 1895
Party	Candidate	Votes	%	±%
Conservative	Francis Henderson	1,287	54%	N/A
Conservative	Augustus Frederick Warr	1,243	52%	N/A
Conservative	Richard Dart	1,221	51%	N/A
Liberal	Robert Kirkland	1,092	46%	N/A
Liberal	Edward Paull	1,036	44%	N/A
Liberal	Robert McDuff	905	38%	N/A
Majority				N/A
Registered electors		3,718		
Turnout				N/A
Conservative win (new seat)				
Conservative win (new seat)				
Conservative win (new seat)				
