= 1918 Liverpool City Council election =

Liverpool City Council elections 1918

← 1914	November 1, 1918	1919 →

3 new seats were up for election 69 (incl. Aldermen) seats needed for a majority

Because the First World War was still underway at the date of the election, under the terms of the Parliament and Local Elections Act, 1918, the term of office of the members of the Council were extended by one year.

However, there were three new seats for which elections were held. These were new second seats for Allerton, Childwall and Little Woolton; Fazakerley and Much Woolton wards that up until this date had each been represented by a single councillor. Two of these three elections were uncontested,

After the election, the composition of the council was:

Party	Councillors	±	Aldermen	Total
Conservative	??	??	??	??
Liberal	??	??	??	??
Irish Nationalist	??	??	??	??
Labour	??	??	0	??
Independent	??	0	0	??

== Election result ==
Liverpool local election result 1918
Party	Seats	Gains	Losses	Net gain/loss	Seats %	Votes %	Votes	+/−
Conservative		2	0	2				
Liberal		0	0	0				
Labour		1	0	1			14,966	
Irish Nationalist		0	0	0				
Independents		0	0	0				

== Ward results ==
=== Allerton, Childwall and Little Woolton ===
No. 34 Allerton, Childwall and Little Woolton
Party	Candidate	Votes	%	±%
Conservative	Herbert John Davis	unopposed		
Registered electors				
Conservative win (new seat)				

=== Fazakerley ===
No. 31 Fazakerley
Party	Candidate	Votes	%	±%
Labour	Robert Watson	705	67%	
Liberal	Helena Agnes Dalrymple Muspratt	341	33%	
Majority		264		
Registered electors				
Turnout		1,046		
Labour win (new seat)				

=== Much Woolton ===
No. 35 Much Woolton
Party	Candidate	Votes	%	±%
Conservative	John Buchanan Hinshaw	unopposed		
Registered electors				
Conservative win (new seat)				

== Aldermanic Elections ==
=== Aldermanic Election 22 January 1919 ===
Caused by the resignation of Alderman Sir Charles Petrie, Bart (Conservative, last elected as an Alderman on 9 November 1910) which was reported to the Council on 9 November 1918

In his place, Councillor Frederick James Rawlinson (Conservative, Garston, elected 1 November 1913) was elected by the Council as an Alderman on 22 January 1919

Party	Alderman	Ward	Term expires
Conservative	Frederick James Rawlinson	No. 26 Warbreck	1920

=== Aldermanic Election 7 May 1919 ===
Caused by the death of Alderman George Brodrick Smith-Brodrick (Conservative, appointed by the Council as an Alderman on 9 November 1917) on 12 February 1919

In his place Councillor James Wilson Walker (Conservative, Old Swan, elected 1 November 1912) , Tobacco Manufacturer of 37 Westmorland Road, Huyton was elected as an alderman by the councillors on 7 May 1919.

Party	Alderman	Ward	Term expires
Conservative	James Wilson Walker	No. 18 Edge Hill	1923

== Appointment of Councillors ==
During the World War I elections were not held. When vacancies arose, replacement councillors were appointed by the Council rather than being elected in by-elections.

=== No. 30 Wavertree, 9 November 1918 ===
Caused by the resignation of Councillor Alfred Henry Bramley (Conservative, Wavertree, appointed 7 February 1917), which was reported to the Council on 4 September 1918.

In his place Lieutenant-Colonel Henry Langton Beckwith, Architect and Surveyor of Sunnyside, Sandown Park, Wavertree, was appointed by the Council as a Councillor on 9 November 1918

No. 30 Wavertree, 9 November 1918
Party	Former Councillor	Appointed Replacement	Term expires
Conservative	Alfred Henry Bramley	Henry Langton Beckwith	

== By Elections ==
=== No. 15 Sefton Park East, 28 January 1919 ===
Caused by the resignation of Councillor Arthur Bromley Holmes (Party?, elected unopposed on 1 November 1914) which was reported to the Council on 4 December 1918

No. 15 Sefton Park East
Party	Candidate	Votes	%	±%
Liberal	Nessie Stewart-Brown	1,458	53%	
	William Sinclair Crichton	1,273	47%	
Majority		185		
Registered electors				
Turnout		2,731		
Liberal gain from		Swing		

=== No. 37 Garston, 5 February 1919 ===
Caused by the election as an alderman of Councillor Frederick James Rawlinson (Conservative, Garston, elected 1 November 1913) on 22 January 1919

No. 37 Garston
Party	Candidate	Votes	%	±%
Labour	William Henry Paulson	1,801	67%	
	George Atkin	873	33%	
Majority		928		
Registered electors				
Turnout		2,674		
Labour gain from Conservative		Swing		

=== No. 32 Old Swan, 20 May 1919 ===
Caused by Councillor James Wilson Walker (Conservative, Old Swan, elected 1 November 1912) , being elected as an alderman on 7 May 1919 , following the death of Alderman George Brodrick Smith-Brodrick (Conservative, appointed by the Council as an Alderman on 9 November 1917) on 12 February 1919.

No. 32 Old Swan
Party	Candidate	Votes	%	±%
Conservative	Thomas Henry Burton *	1,386	54%	
Labour	Herbert Edward Rose	1,179	44%	
Majority		207		
Registered electors				
Turnout		2,565		
Conservative hold		Swing		

=== No. 21 Everton, 21 May 1919 ===
Caused by the resignation of Councillor Brigadier General Gerald Kyffin-Taylor (Conservative, Everton, elected 1 November 1913) , which was reported to the Council on 7 May 1919

No. 21 Everton
Party	Candidate	Votes	%	±%
Labour	Mary Bamber	1,427	50.04%	
	Joseph Arthur Mawson	1,407	49.65%	
Majority		20		
Registered electors				
Turnout		2,834		
Labour gain from Conservative		Swing		

=== No. 16 Sefton Park West, 22 May 1919 ===
Caused by the resignation of Councillor Ernest Cranstoun Given (Conservative, Sefton Park West, elected 1 November 1911) , which was reported to the Council on 7 May 1919

No. 16 Sefton Park West
Party	Candidate	Votes	%	±%
Conservative	Mabel Fletcher	Unopposed	N/A	N/A
Registered electors				
Conservative hold				

== See also ==
- Liverpool City Council
- Liverpool Town Council elections 1835 - 1879
- Liverpool City Council elections 1880–present
- Mayors and Lord Mayors of Liverpool 1207 to present
- History of local government in England
