= 1947 Liverpool City Council election =

1947 UK local election

← 1946	1 November 1947	1949 →
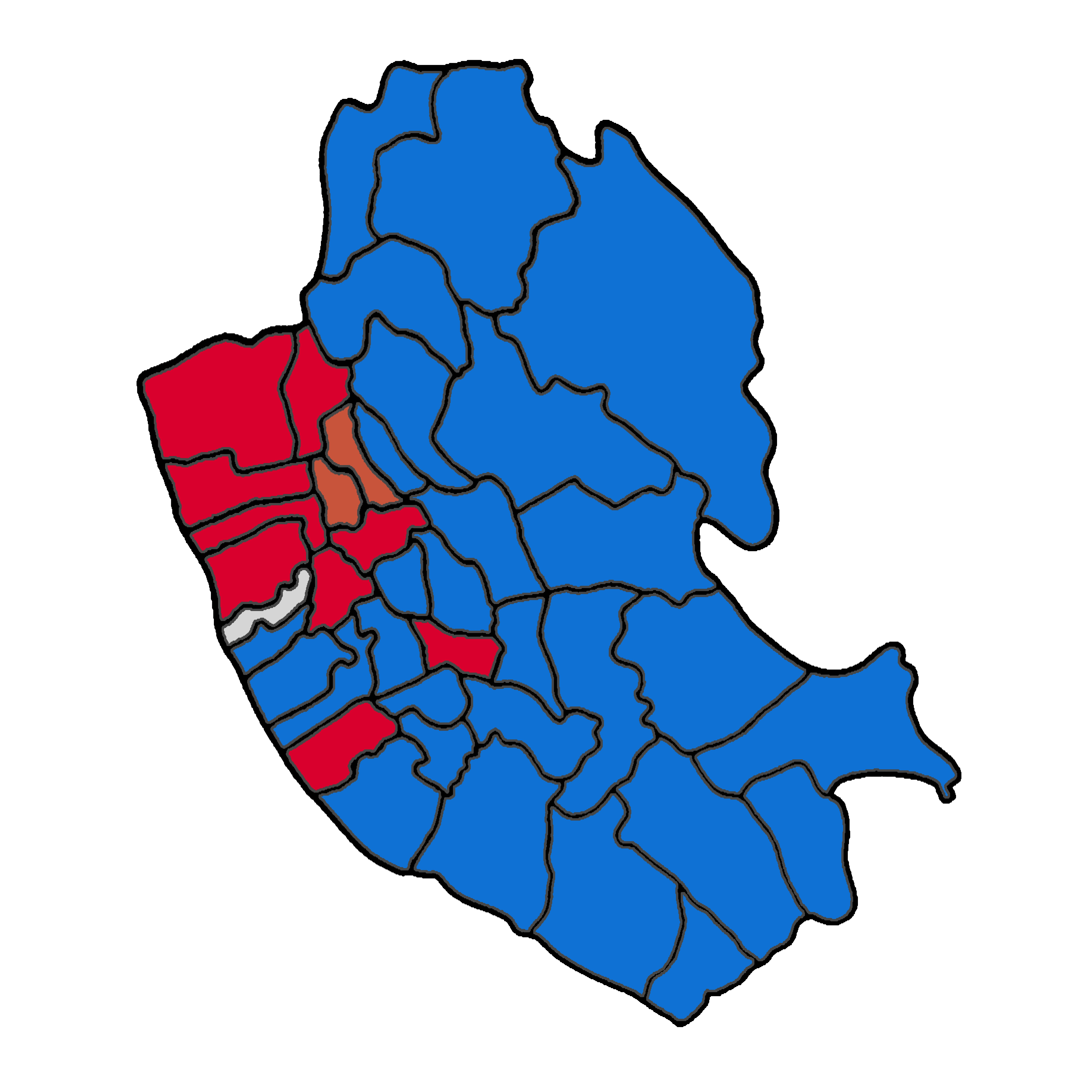
- Map of Liverpool showing wards won (first placed party)

Elections to Liverpool City Council were held on 1 November 1947. This was the last local election held at the beginning of November.

After the election, the composition of the council was:

Party	Councillors	±	Aldermen	Total
Conservative	??	??	??	??
Labour	??	??	??	??
Protestant	??	??	??	??
Liberal	??	??	??	??

== Election result ==
Liverpool local election result 1947
Party	Seats	Gains	Losses	Net gain/loss	Seats %	Votes %	Votes	+/−
Conservative	28					58%	144,371	
Labour	9					39%	98,200	
Protestant	2					2%	5,782	
Independent	1					0.49%	1,216	
Liberal	0				0%	0.21%	527	
Communist	0				0%	0.20%	499	

== Ward results ==
* - Councillor seeking re-election

^{(PARTY)} - Party of former Councillor

Due to the disruption in elections caused by The Second World War no comparisons are made with other elections.

=== Abercromby ===
Abercromby
Party	Candidate	Votes	%	±%
Conservative	Francis Joseph Bullen	3,160	54%	
Labour	Harry Livermore	2,689	46%	
Majority		471		
Registered electors		14,189		
Turnout		5,849	41%	

=== Aigburth ===
Aigburth
Party	Candidate	Votes	%	±%
Conservative	Herbert M. Allen	7,871	83%	
Labour	William Firman Aldis	1,604	17%	
Majority		6,267		
Registered electors		16,307		
Turnout		9,475	58%	

=== Allerton ===
Allerton
Party	Candidate	Votes	%	±%
Conservative	Mrs Margaret J. Strong	3,817	68%	
Labour	Mrs. Edith Evans	1,306	23%	
Liberal	Herbert Griffith Edwards	527	9%	
Majority		2,511		
Registered electors		9,853		
Turnout		5,650	57%	

=== Anfield ===
Anfield
Party	Candidate	Votes	%	±%
Conservative	Albert Joseph White	5,964	64%	
Labour	Richard Clitherow	3,288	36%	
Majority		2,676		
Registered electors		17,429		
Turnout		9,252	53%	

=== Breckfield ===
Breckfield
Party	Candidate	Votes	%	±%
Conservative	David Jean Lewis	4,086	60%	
Labour	John Hamilton	2,681	40%	
Majority		1,405		
Registered electors		13,209		
Turnout		6,767	51%	

=== Brunswick ===
Brunswick
Party	Candidate	Votes	%	±%
Labour	Frank Hampton Cain	2,360	75%	
Conservative	William Henry Beavan	695	22%	
Communist	Albert Southern	83	3%	
Majority		1,665		
Registered electors		13,209		
Turnout		3,138	24%	

=== Castle Street ===
Castle Street
Party	Candidate	Votes	%	±%
Conservative	James Bennett	unopposed		

=== Childwall ===
Childwall
Party	Candidate	Votes	%	±%
Conservative	Alexander Young	5,914	82%	
Labour	William Hamling	1,341	18%	
Majority		4,573		
Registered electors		13,198		
Turnout		7,255	55%	

=== Croxteth ===
Croxteth
Party	Candidate	Votes	%	±%
Conservative	Sydney Smart	6,478	51%	
Labour	William Henry Barton	5,874	47%	
Communist	Miss Winifred May George	244	2%	
Majority		604		
Registered electors		32,352		
Turnout		12,596	39%	
Conservative hold		Swing		

=== Dingle ===
Dingle
Party	Candidate	Votes	%	±%
Conservative	Edward Thomas White	4,951	54%	
Labour	Edward Daniel Whittle	4,194	46%	
Majority		757		
Registered electors		18,941		
Turnout		9,145	48%	
Conservative hold		Swing		

=== Edge Hill ===
Edge Hill
Party	Candidate	Votes	%	±%
Labour	John Bagot	2,822	54%	
Conservative	Stanley Alexander Hughes	2,411	46%	
Independent	Charles Henry Parry	39	1%	
Majority		411		
Registered electors		13,606		
Turnout		5,272	39%	
Labour hold		Swing		

=== Everton ===
Everton
Party	Candidate	Votes	%	±%
Labour	John Braddock	3,138	58%	
Conservative	Charles C. Carter	2,246	42%	
Majority		892		
Registered electors		13,792		
Turnout		5,384	39%	
Labour hold		Swing		

=== Exchange ===
Exchange
Party	Candidate	Votes	%	±%
Independent	Walter McGrath	704	79%	
Labour	Francis Edward Campbell	188	21%	
Majority		516		
Registered electors		1,620		
Turnout		892	55%	
Independent hold		Swing		

=== Fairfield ===
Fairfield
Party	Candidate	Votes	%	±%
Conservative	Robert Nash	5,368	66%	
Labour	Isidore Levin	2,818	34%	
Majority		2,550		
Registered electors		15,930		
Turnout		8,186	51%	
Conservative hold		Swing		

=== Fazakerley ===
Fazakerley
Party	Candidate	Votes	%	±%
Conservative	Kenneth Pugh Thompson	5,571	54%	
Labour	John F. Hughes	4,779	46%	
Majority		792		
Registered electors		20,381		
Turnout		10,350	51%	
Conservative hold		Swing		

=== Garston ===
Garston
Party	Candidate	Votes	%	±%
Conservative	Henry Clarke	5,106	54%	
Labour	William H. Sefton	4,306	46%	
Majority		800		
Registered electors		16,631		
Turnout		9,412	57%	
Conservative hold		Swing		

=== Granby ===
Granby
Party	Candidate	Votes	%	±%
Conservative	James Edward Thompson	3,123	55%	
Labour	Victor Harold E. Baker	2,605	45%	
Majority		518		
Registered electors		13,351		
Turnout		5,728	43%	
Conservative hold		Swing		

=== Great George ===
Great George
Party	Candidate	Votes	%	±%
Conservative	John Gwilym Hughes	1,016	55%	
Labour	Clifford Selly	815	45%	
Majority		201		
Registered electors		3,894		
Turnout		1,831	47%	
Conservative hold		Swing		

=== Kensington ===
Kensington
Party	Candidate	Votes	%	±%
Conservative	Harold W. Hughes	4,033	56%	
Labour	Joseph Brogan	3,221	44%	
Majority		812		
Registered electors		14,481		
Turnout		7,254	50%	
Conservative hold		Swing		

=== Kirkdale ===
Kirkdale
Party	Candidate	Votes	%	±%
Labour	John Francis Carr	4,680	52%	
Conservative	Joseph Trevor Booth	4,328	48%	
Majority		352		
Registered electors		19,759		
Turnout		9,008	46%	
Labour hold		Swing		

=== Little Woolton ===
Little Woolton
Party	Candidate	Votes	%	±%
Conservative	Gordon Frederick Catlin	1,134	84%	
Labour	William Thomas Benn	189	14%	
Independent	Frederick Bowman	21	2%	
Majority		945		
Registered electors		1,974		
Turnout		1,344	68%	
Conservative hold		Swing		

=== Low Hill ===
Low Hill
Party	Candidate	Votes	%	±%
Conservative	Samuel Cecil Saltmarsh	3,319	55%	
Labour	David Horan	2,716	45%	
Majority		603		
Registered electors		12,346		
Turnout		6,035	49%	
Conservative hold		Swing		

=== Much Woolton ===
Much Woolton
Party	Candidate	Votes	%	±%
Conservative	Isaac Robinson	2,331	74%	
Labour	Noel Arthur Pinches	838	26%	
Majority		1,493		
Registered electors		5,463		
Turnout		3,169	58%	
Conservative hold		Swing		

=== Netherfield ===
Netherfield
Party	Candidate	Votes	%	±%
Protestant	George Edward Lewis	2,446	63%	
Labour	George Carmichael	1,427	37%	
Majority		1,019		
Registered electors		10,375		
Turnout		3,873	37%	
Protestant hold		Swing		

=== North Scotland ===
North Scotland
Party	Candidate	Votes	%	±%
Labour	Frederick William Tucker	1,781	75%	
Conservative	John Kenneth Hart	416	18%	
Communist	John Coward	172	7%	
Majority		1,365		
Registered electors		7,237		
Turnout		2,369	33%	
Labour hold		Swing		

=== Old Swan ===
Old Swan
Party	Candidate	Votes	%	±%
Conservative	Alfred Nathaniel Bates	9,000	66%	
Labour	William Williams	4,669	34%	
Majority		4,331		
Registered electors		28,181		
Turnout		13,669	49%	
Conservative hold		Swing		

=== Prince's Park ===
Prince's Park
Party	Candidate	Votes	%	±%
Conservative	Charles Cowlin	3,456	55%	
Labour	Henry Evans	2,838	45%	
Majority		618		
Registered electors		12,488		
Turnout		6,294	50%	
Conservative hold		Swing		

=== Sandhills ===
Sandhills
Party	Candidate	Votes	%	±%
Labour	Stanley Part	2,421	73%	
Conservative	Frederick Charles Hitches	891	27%	
Majority		1,530		
Registered electors		8,047		
Turnout		3,312	41%	
Labour hold		Swing		

=== St. Anne's ===
St. Anne's
Party	Candidate	Votes	%	±%
Labour	Abram Louis Caplan	1,679	62%	
Conservative	Joseph Edward Gallagher	574	21%	
Independent	Thomas Patrick Healy	452	17%	
Majority		1,105		
Registered electors		6,242		
Turnout		2,705	43%	
Labour hold		Swing		

=== St. Domingo ===
St. Domingo
Party	Candidate	Votes	%	±%
Protestant	Mrs. Mary Jane Longbottom	3,336	60%	
Labour	Walter Richard Maylor	2,222	40%	
Majority		1,114		
Registered electors		13,378		
Turnout		5,558	42%	
Protestant hold		Swing		

=== St. Peter's ===
St. Peter's
Party	Candidate	Votes	%	±%
Conservative	James William Brown	411	70%	
Labour	Peter James O'Hare	178	30%	
Majority		233		
Registered electors		1,281		
Turnout		589	46%	
Conservative hold		Swing		

=== Sefton Park East ===
Sefton Park East
Party	Candidate	Votes	%	±%
Conservative	Walter Isaac Throssell	4,555	74%	
Labour	Norman Bates	1,622	26%	
Majority		2,933		
Registered electors		14,687		
Turnout		6,177	42%	
Conservative hold		Swing		

=== Sefton Park West ===
Sefton Park West
Party	Candidate	Votes	%	±%
Conservative	Frederick Bidston	4,454	78%	
Labour	Mrs. Anne Caine	1,292	22%	
Majority		3,162		
Registered electors		11,243		
Turnout		5,746	51%	
Conservative hold		Swing		

=== South Scotland ===
South Scotland
Party	Candidate	Votes	%	±%
Labour	John Sheehan	unopposed		
Registered electors		6,302		
Labour hold		Swing		

=== Vauxhall ===
Vauxhall
Party	Candidate	Votes	%	±%
Labour	Joseph Cyril Brady	918	69%	
Conservative	Mrs. Freda James	421	31%	
Majority		497		
Registered electors		2,705		
Turnout		1,339	50%	
Labour hold		Swing		

=== Walton ===
Walton
Party	Candidate	Votes	%	±%
Conservative	Mrs. Mary Elizabeth Jones	7,331	60%	
Labour	William Richard Gerrard	4,921	40%	
Majority		2,410		
Registered electors		23,678		
Turnout		12,252	52%	
Conservative hold		Swing		

=== Warbreck ===
Warbreck
Party	Candidate	Votes	%	±%
Conservative	William Rickard	6,661	71%	
Labour	Francis David Heron	2,690	29%	
Majority		3,971		
Registered electors		19,774		
Turnout		9,351	47%	
Conservative hold		Swing		

=== Wavertree ===
Wavertree
Party	Candidate	Votes	%	±%
Conservative	Stanley Ronald Williams	8,590	73%	
Labour	Francis Burke	3,225	27%	
Majority		5,365		
Registered electors		23,200		
Turnout		11,815	51%	
Conservative hold		Swing		

=== Wavertree West ===
Wavertree West
Party	Candidate	Votes	%	±%
Conservative	Harold Lees	3,487	55%	
Labour	Thomas Warburton Jolley	2,857	45%	
Majority		630		
Registered electors		11,729		
Turnout		6,344	54%	
Conservative hold		Swing		

=== West Derby ===
West Derby
Party	Candidate	Votes	%	±%
Conservative	Hedley Arthur Williams	11,202	69%	
Labour	Edward William Harby	5,008	31%	
Majority		6,194		
Registered electors		31,782		
Turnout		16,210	51%	
Conservative hold		Swing		

== By-elections ==
=== Great George 20 January 1948 ===
Caused by the resignation of Mr. Robert Edward Cottier (Labour, elected November 1945).

Great George
Party	Candidate	Votes	%	±%
Labour	Clifford Skelly	719	50%	
Conservative	Charlotte Emma Turner	716	50%	
Majority		3		
Registered electors		3,894		
Turnout		1,435		
Conservative gain from Labour		Swing		

=== Kensington 15 April 1948 ===
Caused by the death of Councillor Frederick Harold Bailey (Conservative, elected November 1946) on 24 February 1948

Kensington
Party	Candidate	Votes	%	±%
Conservative	Stephen Minion	3,199		
Labour	Joseph Brogan	2,267		
Majority				
Registered electors		14,481		
Turnout		5,466		
Conservative hold		Swing		

=== Walton 10 June 1948 ===
Alderman James Graham Reece JP died on 24 March 1948'

Councillor Reginald Richard Bailey was elected as an Alderman by the Council on 5 May 1948.

Walton
Party	Candidate	Votes	%	±%
Conservative	George Moore	5,145		
Labour	William Richard Gerrard	3,056		
Majority		2,109		
Registered electors		23,678		
Turnout		8,205		
Conservative hold		Swing		

=== Edge Hill 22 July 1948 ===
Caused by the resignation of Arthur Leadbetter (Labour, elected November 1946)

Edge Hill
Party	Candidate	Votes	%	±%
Labour	David Horan	2,217		
	Samuel Curtis	1,876		
	Sidney Foster	85		
Independent	Charles Henry Parry	18		
Majority		341		
Registered electors		13,606		
Turnout				
Labour hold		Swing		

Councillor James Bennett O.B.E. died on 24 September 1948.

Councillor James Forster Brakell died on 4 October 1948.
