= 1896 Liverpool City Council election =

English local election

← 1895	November 1, 1896	1897 →

28 seats were up for election: one seat for each of the 28 wards 57 (incl. Aldermen) seats needed for a majority

Elections to Liverpool City Council were held on Monday 2 November 1896. One third of the council seats were up for election, the term of office of each councillor being three years.

After the election, the composition of the council was:

Party	Councillors	±	Aldermen	Total
Conservative	57	-3	??	??
Liberal	17	-3	6	23
Irish Nationalists	9	0	2	11
Liberal Unionist	1	0	1	2

== Election result ==
Liverpool local election result 1896
Party	Seats	Gains	Losses	Net gain/loss	Seats %	Votes %	Votes	+/−
Conservative	17	0	3	-3		28%	9,559	
Liberal	7	3	0	+3		35%	12,031	
Irish Nationalist	3	0	0	0		8.7%	3,010	
Labour	0	0	0	0	0%	3.8%	1,318	
Independent Irish Nationalist	0	0	0	0	0%	0.6%	208	
Independent	0	0	0	0	0%	0.08%	28	

== Ward results ==
* - Retiring Councillor seeking re-election

Comparisons are made with the 1895 election results, as the retiring councillors were elected in that year.

=== Abercromby ===
No. 21 Abercromby
Party	Candidate	Votes	%	±%
Conservative	Morris Paterson Jones *	976	58%	
Liberal	William Boyle	688	41%	
Labour	John O'Brien	17	1%	
Majority		288		
Registered electors		3,049		
Turnout		1,681	55%	
Conservative hold		Swing		

=== Breckfield ===
No. 6 Breckfield
Party	Candidate	Votes	%	±%
Conservative	Louis Samuel Cohen *	1,240	88%	
Labour	Robert Clement Faulkener	175	12%	
Majority		1,065		
Registered electors		3,978		
Turnout		1,415	36%	
Conservative hold		Swing		

=== Brunswick ===
No. 25 Brunswick
Party	Candidate	Votes	%	±%
Conservative	Charles Arden *	1,073	52%	
Liberal	John Alphonse Doughan	981	48%	
Majority		92		
Registered electors		3,110		
Turnout		2,054	66%	
Conservative hold		Swing		

=== Castle Street ===
No. 18 Castle Street
Party	Candidate	Votes	%	±%
Conservative	John Lawrence	unopposed		
Registered electors				
Conservative hold		Swing		

=== Dingle ===
No. 26 Dingle
Party	Candidate	Votes	%	±%
Conservative	William Robets *	unopposed		
Registered electors				
Conservative hold		Swing		

=== Edge Hill ===
No. 12 Edge Hill
Party	Candidate	Votes	%	±%
Conservative	Samuel Wasse Higginbottom *	1,446	67%	
Labour	Samuel Reeves	725	33%	
Majority		721		
Registered electors		4,770		
Turnout		2,171	46%	
Conservative hold		Swing		

=== Everton ===
No. 9 Everton
Party	Candidate	Votes	%	±%
Liberal	Captain William Denton	1,342	51%	
Conservative	John Richard Pritchard *	1,209	46%	
Labour	James Brinton	71	3%	
Majority		133		
Registered electors		4,826		
Turnout		2,622	65%	
Liberal gain from Conservative		Swing		

=== Exchange ===
No. 16 Exchange
Party	Candidate	Votes	%	±%
Liberal	Edmond Brownbill *	unopposed		
Registered electors				
Liberal hold		Swing		

=== Fairfield ===
No. 4 Fairfield
Party	Candidate	Votes	%	±%
Conservative	Frank John Leslie *	unopposed		
Registered electors				
Conservative hold		Swing		

=== Granby ===
No. 22 Granby
Party	Candidate	Votes	%	±%
Liberal	John Lea *	1,404	56%	
Conservative	Arthur Noel Newling	1,085	44%	
Majority		319		
Registered electors		3,978		
Turnout		2,489	63%	
Liberal hold		Swing		

=== Great George ===
No. 20 Great George
Party	Candidate	Votes	%	±%
Liberal	John Lamport Ellis *	767	57%	
Conservative	George Brodrick Smith Brodrick	581	43%	
Majority		186		
Registered electors		2,216		
Turnout		1,348	61%	
Liberal hold		Swing		

=== Kensington ===
No. 11 Kensington
Party	Candidate	Votes	%	±%
Conservative	Captain William Henry Edwards *	1,348	59%	
Liberal	William Henry Watts the younger	681	30%	
Labour	Isaac Newton	250	11%	
Majority		667		
Registered electors		4,175		
Turnout		2,279	55%	
Conservative hold		Swing		

=== Kirkdale ===
No. 2 Kirkdale
Party	Candidate	Votes	%	±%
Conservative	Robert Thompson *	unopposed		
Registered electors				
Conservative hold		Swing		

=== Low Hill ===
No. 10 Low Hill
Party	Candidate	Votes	%	±%
Conservative	Col. Charles Stewart Dean *	1,304	50.02%	
Liberal	Dr. Joseph George McCann	1,303	49.98%	
Majority		1		
Registered electors		4,151		
Turnout		2,607	63%	
Conservative hold		Swing		

=== Netherfield ===
No. 8 Netherfield
Party	Candidate	Votes	%	±%
Conservative	William Watson Rutherford *	1,203	89%	
Independent Irish Nationalist	Thomas Burke	146	11%	
Majority		1,057		
Registered electors		4,327		
Turnout		1,349	31%	
Conservative hold		Swing		

=== North Scotland ===
No. 13 North Scotland
Party	Candidate	Votes	%	±%
Irish Nationalist	Edward Purcell *	unopposed		
Registered electors				
Irish Nationalist hold		Swing		

=== North Walton ===
No. 27 North Walton
Party	Candidate	Votes	%	±%
Conservative	Peter McGuffie	1,069	70%	
Liberal	Thomas Macreavey	448	30%	
Majority		621		
Registered electors		3,263		
Turnout		1,517	46%	
Conservative gain from Liberal		Swing		

=== Prince's Park ===
No. 23 Prince's Park
Party	Candidate	Votes	%	±%
Conservative	Walter William Thomas *	unopposed		
Registered electors				
Conservative hold		Swing		

=== Sandhills ===
No. 1 Sandhills
Party	Candidate	Votes	%	±%
Irish Nationalist	Patrick Joseph Deery *	1,062	53%	
Conservative	George Louis Meade	932	47%	
Majority		130		
Registered electors		3,196		
Turnout		1,994	62%	
Irish Nationalist hold		Swing		

=== St. Anne's ===
No. 17 St. Anne's
Party	Candidate	Votes	%	±%
Liberal	George King	1,110	52%	
Conservative	Ellis Brammall junior	944	44%	
Independent Irish Nationalist	John McKiernan	62	2.9%	
Independent	George John Trgilgas	28	1.3%	
Majority		166		
Registered electors		3,485		
Turnout		2,144	62%	
Liberal gain from Conservative		Swing		

=== St. Domingo ===
No. 7 St. Domingo
Party	Candidate	Votes	%	±%
Conservative	Joseph Bennett Colton *	1,107	66%	
Liberal	Thomas Pritchard	481	29%	
Labour	Clement William George	80	4.8%	
Majority		626		
Registered electors		4,479		
Turnout		1,668	37%	
Conservative hold		Swing		

=== St. Peter's ===
No. 19 St. Peter's
Party	Candidate	Votes	%	±%
Liberal	Samuel Hough *	unopposed		
Registered electors				
Liberal hold		Swing		

=== Sefton Park ===
No. 24 Sefton Park
Party	Candidate	Votes	%	±%
Conservative	Richard Dart *	unopposed		
Registered electors				
Conservative hold		Swing		

=== South Scotland ===
No. 14 South Scotland
Party	Candidate	Votes	%	±%
Irish Nationalist	Owen O'Hara *	1,072	71%	
Irish Nationalist	Patrick Jeremiah Kelly	438	29%	
Majority		634		
Registered electors		3,537		
Turnout		1,510	43%	
Irish Nationalist hold		Swing		

=== South Walton ===
No. 3 South Walton
Party	Candidate	Votes	%	±%
Conservative	Dr. Henry Richard Powell *	1,044	50.3%	
Liberal	Arthur Henry Bunney	1,032	49.7%	
Majority		12		
Registered electors		3,728		
Turnout		2,076	56%	
Conservative hold		Swing		

=== Vauxhall ===
No. 15 Vauxhall
Party	Candidate	Votes	%	±%
Liberal	Richard Robert Meade-King *	unopposed		
Registered electors				
Liberal hold		Swing		

=== Wavertree ===
No. 5 Wavertree
Party	Candidate	Votes	%	±%
Liberal	John Kellitt	919	51%	
Conservative	Henry Arthur Watson *	899	49%	
Majority		20		
Registered electors		2,494		
Turnout		1,818	73%	
Liberal gain from Conservative		Swing		

=== West Derby ===
No. 28 West Derby
Party	Candidate	Votes	%	±%
Conservative	William Craigie Williams *	1,057	55%	
Liberal	Thomas Utley	875	45%	
Majority		182		
Registered electors		3,085		
Turnout		1,932	63%	
Conservative hold		Swing		

== By-elections ==
=== No.20 Great George, 20 November 1896 ===
Caused by the death of Councillor Simeon Smith (Liberal, Great George elected 1 November 1895) on 28 October 1896.

No. 20 Great George
Party	Candidate	Votes	%	±%
Liberal	Edward Paull JP	unopposed		
Registered electors		2,216		
Liberal hold		Swing		

=== No. 4, Fairfield, 16 March 1897 ===
Caused by the death of Councillor Thomas Hewitson (Conservative, Fairfield, elected 1 November 1895) on 6 February 1897.

No. 4 Fairfield
Party	Candidate	Votes	%	±%
Conservative	Joseph Hunter	unopposed		
Registered electors				
Conservative hold		Swing		

=== No.10, Low Hill, 16 March 1897 ===
Following a petition causing the election of Col. Charles Stewart Dean (Conservative) on 2 November 1896 to be declared void.

No. 10 Low Hill
Party	Candidate	Votes	%	±%
Conservative	Col. Charles Stewart Dean *	1,636	53%	
Liberal	Dr. Joseph George McCann	1,427	47%	
Majority		209		
Registered electors		4,151		
Turnout		3,063	74%	
Conservative hold		Swing		

== See also ==
- Liverpool City Council
- Liverpool Town Council elections 1835 - 1879
- Liverpool City Council elections 1880–present
- Mayors and Lord Mayors of Liverpool 1207 to present
- History of local government in England
