= 1897 Liverpool City Council election =

English local election

← 1896	November 1, 1897	1898 →

28 seats were up for election: one seat for each of the 28 wards 57 (incl. Aldermen) seats needed for a majority

Elections to Liverpool City Council were held on Thursday 1 November 1897. One third of the council seats were up for election, the term of office of each councillor being three years.

After the election, the composition of the council was:

Party	Councillors	±	Aldermen	Total
Conservative	??	-1	??	??
Liberal	??	+1	??	??
Irish Nationalists	??	0	??	??

== Election result ==
Liverpool local election result 1897
Party	Seats	Gains	Losses	Net gain/loss	Seats %	Votes %	Votes	+/−
Conservative	21	0	1	-1	75%	55%	24,293	
Liberal	4	1	0	+1	14%	40%	17,888	
Irish Nationalist	3	0	0	0	11%			
Labour	0	0	0	0	0%	2.8%	1,243	
Independent	0	0	0	0	0%	1.8%	787	
Ind. Conservative	0	0	0	0	0%	0.043%	19	

== Ward results ==
* - Retiring Councillor seeking re-election

Comparisons are made with the 1895 election results, as the retiring councillors were elected in that year.

=== Abercromby ===
No. 21 Abercromby
Party	Candidate	Votes	%	±%
Conservative	Lorents Braun Haddock	1,076	56%	
Liberal	Louis Bartlett Phillips	854	44%	
Majority		222		
Registered electors		3,089		
Turnout		1,930	62%	
Conservative hold		Swing		

=== Breckfield ===
No. 6 Breckfield
Party	Candidate	Votes	%	±%
Conservative	William Hall Walker *	1,434	60%	
Liberal	Jonathan Hargrove	973	40%	
Majority		461		
Registered electors		4,038		
Turnout		2,407	60%	
Conservative hold		Swing		

=== Brunswick ===
No. 25 Brunswick
Party	Candidate	Votes	%	±%
Conservative	Hartley Wilson *	1,016	51%	
Liberal	Samuel McMillin	961	49%	
Majority		55		
Registered electors		3,116		
Turnout		1,977	63%	
Conservative hold		Swing		

=== Castle Street ===
No. 18 Castle Street
Party	Candidate	Votes	%	±%
Conservative	John Thomas Wood	unopposed		
Registered electors				
Conservative hold		Swing		

=== Dingle ===
No. 26 Dingle
Party	Candidate	Votes	%	±%
Conservative	Thomas Evans *	1,914	64%	
Liberal	Harold Coventry	1,062	36%	
Majority		852		
Registered electors		5,276		
Turnout		2,976	56%	
Conservative hold		Swing		

=== Edge Hill ===
No. 12 Edge Hill
Party	Candidate	Votes	%	±%
Conservative	James Barclay Light	1,566	66%	
Labour	Samuel Reeves	816	34%	
Majority		750		
Registered electors		4,966		
Turnout		2,382	48%	
Conservative hold		Swing		

=== Everton ===
No. 9 Everton
Party	Candidate	Votes	%	±%
Conservative	Edward Lewis Lloyd *	1,763	55%	
Liberal	Joseph Thompson	1,448	45%	
Ind. Conservative	William Forshaw	19	0.59%	
Majority		315		
Registered electors		4,764		
Turnout		3,230	68%	
Conservative hold		Swing		

=== Exchange ===
No. 16 Exchange
Party	Candidate	Votes	%	±%
Conservative	John Sutherland Harmood-Banner *	unopposed		
Registered electors				
Conservative hold		Swing		

=== Fairfield ===
No. 4 Fairfield
Party	Candidate	Votes	%	±%
Conservative	Thomas May Smith *	853	61%	
Liberal	John Henry Evans	539	39%	
Majority		314		
Registered electors		3,385		
Turnout		1,392	41%	
Conservative hold		Swing		

=== Granby ===
No. 22 Granby
Party	Candidate	Votes	%	±%
Conservative	Albert Henry Samuel *	1,253	51%	
Liberal	Joseph Harrison Jones	1,201	49%	
Majority		52		
Registered electors		3,962		
Turnout		2,454	62%	
Conservative hold		Swing		

=== Great George ===
No. 20 Great George
Party	Candidate	Votes	%	±%
Liberal	Thomas Donnelly	853	54%	
Conservative	George Dalton	736	46%	
Majority		117		
Registered electors		2,338		
Turnout		1,589	68%	
Liberal gain from Conservative		Swing		

=== Kensington ===
No. 11 Kensington
Party	Candidate	Votes	%	±%
Conservative	Edward Barns *	1,404	66%	
Liberal	Joseph Faraday	708	34%	
Majority		696		
Registered electors		4,218		
Turnout		2,112	50%	
Conservative hold		Swing		

=== Kirkdale ===
No. 2 Kirkdale
Party	Candidate	Votes	%	±%
Protestant	John Wilson *	1,939	58%	
Liberal	John Lyon Langford	1,398	42%	
Majority		541		
Registered electors		6,265		
Turnout		3,337	53%	
Conservative hold		Swing		

=== Low Hill ===
No. 10 Low Hill
Party	Candidate	Votes	%	±%
Conservative	Charles Petrie *	1,656	61%	
Liberal	William Boote	1,006	37%	
Independent	Edward Stott	37	1.4%	
Majority		650		
Registered electors		4,215		
Turnout		2,699	64%	
Conservative hold		Swing		

=== Netherfield ===
No. 8 Netherfield
Party	Candidate	Votes	%	±%
Conservative	Simon Jude *	1,389	82%	
Labour	John Shannon	313	18%	
Majority		1,076		
Registered electors		4.342		
Turnout		1,702	39%	
Conservative hold		Swing		

=== North Scotland ===
No. 13 North Scotland
Party	Candidate	Votes	%	±%
Irish Nationalist	James Daly *	unopposed		
Registered electors				
Irish Nationalist hold		Swing		

=== North Walton ===
No. 27 North Walton
Party	Candidate	Votes	%	±%
Conservative	John Harvey Farmer *	unopposed		
Registered electors				
Conservative hold		Swing		

=== Prince's Park ===
No. 23 Prince's Park
Party	Candidate	Votes	%	±%
Conservative	William James Burgess *	unopposed		
Registered electors				
Conservative hold		Swing		

=== Sandhills ===
No. 1 Sandhills
Party	Candidate	Votes	%	±%
Liberal	William Nelson *	998	62%	
Independent	William Hopson	623	38%	
Majority		375		
Registered electors		3,334		
Turnout		1,621	49%	
Liberal hold		Swing		

=== St. Anne's ===
No. 17 St. Anne's
Party	Candidate	Votes	%	±%
Liberal	Jacob Reuben Grant *	721	89%	
Independent	Hanst Hargreaves	50	6%	
Independent	Edward Phillips	42	5%	
Majority		671		
Registered electors		3,473		
Turnout		813	23%	
Liberal hold		Swing		

=== St. Domingo ===
No. 7 St. Domingo
Party	Candidate	Votes	%	±%
Conservative	Robert Alfred Hampson *	1,541	68%	
Liberal	Charles Albert Slater	611	27%	
Labour	Clement William George	114	5%	
Majority		930		
Registered electors		4,603		
Turnout		2,266	49%	
Conservative hold		Swing		

=== St. Peter's ===
No. 19 St. Peter's
Party	Candidate	Votes	%	±%
Liberal	William Henry Watts *	416	92%	
Independent	Alfred Allsop	35	7.8%	
Majority		381		
Registered electors		2,078		
Turnout		451	22%	
Liberal hold		Swing		

=== Sefton Park ===
No. 24 Sefton Park
Party	Candidate	Votes	%	±%
Conservative	Augustus Frederick Warr MP *	1,413	56%	
Liberal	John Morris	1,094	44%	
Majority		319		
Registered electors		4,366		
Turnout		2,507	57%	
Conservative hold		Swing		

=== South Scotland ===
No. 14 South Scotland
Party	Candidate	Votes	%	±%
Irish Nationalist	Patrick Kearney *	unopposed		
Registered electors				
Irish Nationalist hold		Swing		

=== South Walton ===
No. 3 South Walton
Party	Candidate	Votes	%	±%
Conservative	Robert Atwood Beaver	1,218	51%	
Liberal	Arthur Henry Bunney	1,162	49%	
Majority		56		
Registered electors		3,703		
Turnout		2,380	54%	
Conservative hold		Swing		

=== Vauxhall ===
No. 15 Vauxhall
Party	Candidate	Votes	%	±%
Irish Nationalist	Thomas John Flynn *	unopposed		
Registered electors				
Irish Nationalist hold		Swing		

=== Wavertree ===
No. 5 Wavertree
Party	Candidate	Votes	%	±%
Conservative	Arthur Crosthwaite *	1,053	54%	
Liberal	Charles William Jones	900	46%	
Majority		153		
Registered electors		2,598		
Turnout		1,953	75%	
Conservative hold		Swing		

=== West Derby ===
No. 28 West Derby
Party	Candidate	Votes	%	±%
Conservative	Robert Edward Walkington Stephenson *	1,069	52%	
Liberal	Thomas Utley	983	48%	
Majority		86		
Registered electors		3,132		
Turnout		2,052	66%	
Conservative hold		Swing		

== By-elections ==
=== No.25, Brunswick ===
Caused by the death of Councillor Charles Arden (Conservative, Brunswick, elected 1 November 1896) on 29 November 1897.

No. 25 Brunswick
Party	Candidate	Votes	%	±%
Conservative	George Dalton	1,053	51%	
Liberal	John Clancy	1,015	49%	
	Edward Phillips	8	0.39%	
Majority		38		
Registered electors		3,116		
Turnout		2,076	67%	
Conservative hold		Swing		

=== No.3, South Walton, 25 January 1898 ===
Caused by the death of Councillor Dr. Henry Richard Powell (Conservative, South Walton, elected 1 November 1896) .

No. 3 South Walton
Party	Candidate	Votes	%	±%
Conservative	George Brodrick Smith-Brodrick	unopposed		
Registered electors		3,703		
Conservative hold		Swing		

=== No.12, Edge Hill, 26 April 1898 ===
Caused by the death of Councillor Jonathan Parry (Conservative, Edge Hill, elected 1 November 1895) on 5 March 1898.

No. 12 Edge Hill
Party	Candidate	Votes	%	±%
Conservative	William Wilson Walker	1,066	75%	
Labour	Samuel Reeves	354	25%	
Majority		712		
Registered electors		4,966		
Turnout		1,420	29%	
Conservative hold		Swing		

=== No. 3 South Walton, 20 July 1898 ===
Alderman Joseph Glover died on 21 April 1898.

The Right Honourable Sir Arthur Bower Forwood, Bart. MP was elected as an Alderman by the Council on 1 June 1898 .

The Right Honourable Sir Arthur Bower Forwood, Bart.MP resigned as an Alderman on 1 June 1898.

Councillor John Ellison (Conservative, South Walton, elected 1 November 1895) was elected as an Alderman by the city Council

No. 3 South Walton
Party	Candidate	Votes	%	±%
Conservative	William Houlding B.Sc.	unopposed		
Registered electors		3,703		
Conservative hold		Swing		

=== No.24, Sefton Park, 18 October 1898 ===
Caused by the resignation of Councillor Augustus Frederick Warr MP (Conservative, Sefton Park, elected 1 November 1895 which was reported to the Council on 5 October 1898.

No. 24 Sefton Park
Party	Candidate	Votes	%	±%
Conservative	Radcliffe William Smith	unopposed		
Registered electors		4,366		
Conservative hold		Swing		

== See also ==
- Liverpool City Council
- Liverpool Town Council elections 1835 - 1879
- Liverpool City Council elections 1880–present
- Mayors and Lord Mayors of Liverpool 1207 to present
- History of local government in England
