= 1950 Liverpool City Council election =

1950 UK local election

- 11 May 1950
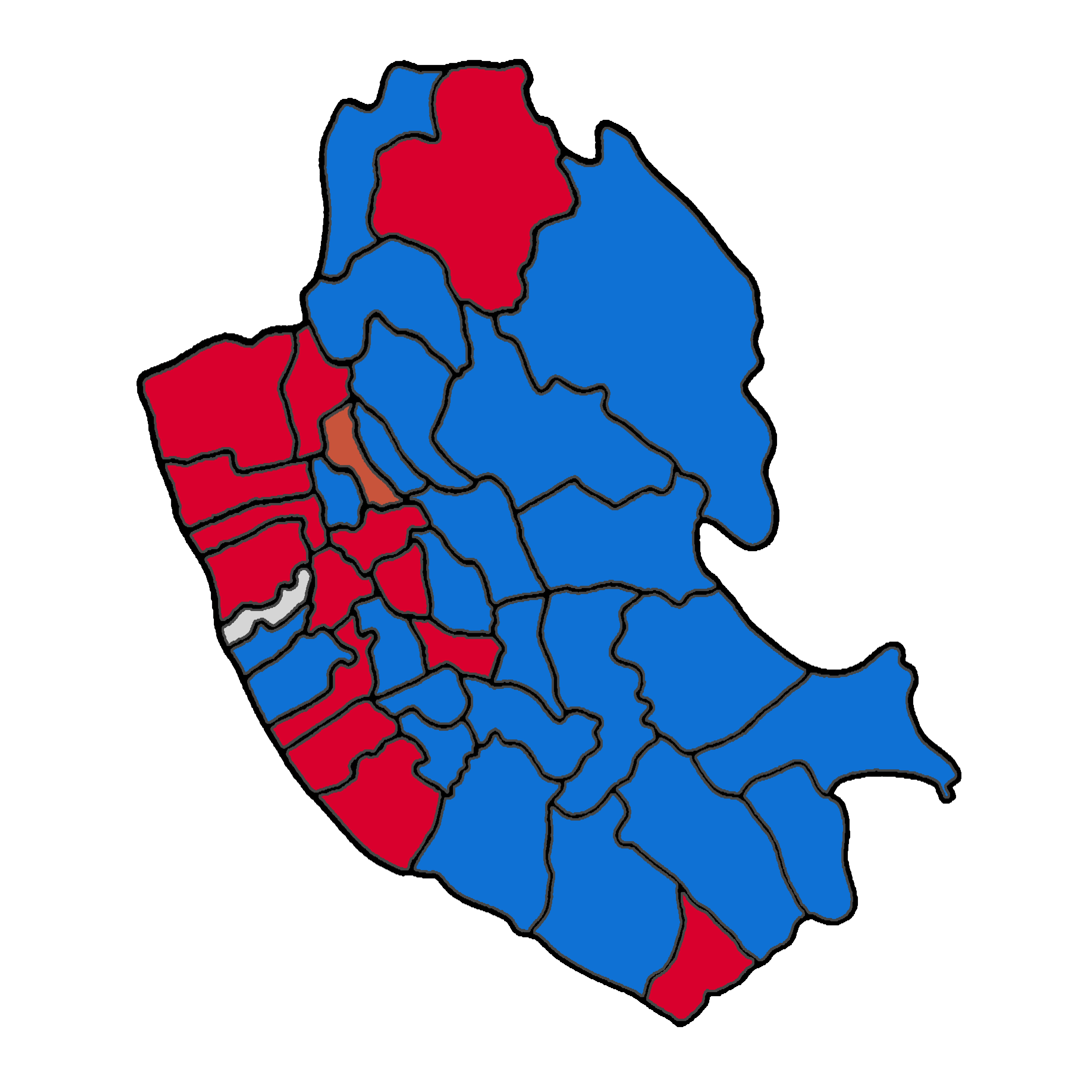
- Map of Liverpool showing wards won (first placed party)

Elections to Liverpool City Council were held on Thursday 11 May 1950.

After the election, the composition of the council was:

Party	Councillors	±	Aldermen	Total
Conservative	78	+1	28	106
Labour	34	-1	7	40
Protestant	5	0	1	6
Liberal	0	0	2	2

== Election result ==
Liverpool local election result 1950
Party	Seats	Gains	Losses	Net gain/loss	Seats %	Votes %	Votes	+/−
Conservative						54.11	110,333	
Labour						41.53	84,674	
Liberal						0.73	1,485	
Protestant						2.40	4,898	
Communist						0.51	1,043	

== Ward results ==
* - Councillor seeking re-election

^{(PARTY)} - Party of former Councillor

Comparisons are made with the 1947 election results.

=== Abercromby ===
Abercromby
Party	Candidate	Votes	%	±%
Conservative	John Cheshire ^{(PARTY)}	2,747	51%	
Labour	William Smyth	2,482	46%	
Communist	Colin Cameron	179	3%	
Majority		265		
Registered electors		13,210		
Turnout		5,408	41%	
Conservative hold		Swing		

=== Aigburth ===
Aigburth
Party	Candidate	Votes	%	±%
Conservative	Richard Meredith Alcock	5,881	81%	−2%
Liberal	William Edward Oates	697	10%	
Labour	Thomas George White	668	9%	−8%
Majority		5,184		
Registered electors		15,667		
Turnout		7,246	46%	−12%
Conservative hold		Swing		

=== Allerton ===
Allerton
Party	Candidate	Votes	%	±%
Conservative	John McMillan ^{(PARTY)}	unopposed		
Registered electors		9,477		
Conservative hold		Swing		

=== Anfield ===
Anfield
Party	Candidate	Votes	%	±%
Conservative	William John Harrop ^{(PARTY)}	4,899	69%	+5%
Labour	Walter Richard Maylor	2,252	31%	−5%
Majority		2,647		
Registered electors		16,612		
Turnout		7,151	43%	−10%
Conservative hold		Swing		

=== Breckfield ===
Breckfield
Party	Candidate	Votes	%	±%
Conservative	George William Prout *	3,329	64%	+4%
Labour	Terence Roberts	1,907	36%	−4%
Majority		1,422		
Registered electors		12,890		
Turnout		5,236	41%	−10%
Conservative hold		Swing		

=== Brunswick ===
Brunswick
Party	Candidate	Votes	%	±%
Labour	James Henry Flyn ^{(PARTY)}	2,421	82%	+7%
Independent	Walter McGrath	520	18%	
Majority		1,901		
Registered electors		7,470		
Turnout		2,941	39%	+15%
Labour hold		Swing		

=== Castle Street ===
Castle Street
Party	Candidate	Votes	%	±%
Conservative	Thomas Winlack Harley ^{(PARTY)}	559	98%	
Labour	Harry Livermore	9	2%	
Majority		550		
Registered electors		860		
Turnout		568	66%	
Conservative hold		Swing		

=== Childwall ===
Childwall
Party	Candidate	Votes	%	±%
Conservative	Jack Creswell ^{(PARTY)}	5,004	84%	+2%
Labour	William Dean Jones	952	16%	−2%
Majority		4,052		
Registered electors		13,286		
Turnout		5,956	45%	−10%
Conservative hold		Swing		

=== Croxteth ===
Croxteth
Party	Candidate	Votes	%	±%
Conservative	Norman Arthur Williams ^{(PARTY)}	6,178	50%	−1%
Labour	James Cullen	6,051	49%	+2%
Communist	John Thomas Whewell	166	-1%	
Majority		127		
Registered electors		33,509		
Turnout		12,395	37%	−2%
Conservative hold		Swing		

=== Dingle ===
Dingle
Party	Candidate	Votes	%	±%
Labour	William Basil Cashin	4,232	50%	+4%
Conservative	Stanley Airey ^{(PARTY)}	4,176	50%	−4%
Majority		56		
Registered electors		17,793		
Turnout		8,408	47%	−1%
Labour gain from Conservative		Swing		

=== Edge Hill ===
Edge Hill
Party	Candidate	Votes	%	±%
Labour	David Horan ^{(PARTY)}	2,712	57%	+3%
Conservative	Hugh Maule Jones	1,937	41%	−5%
Communist	Thomas McCann	85	2%	
Majority		775		
Registered electors		13,489		
Turnout		4,734	35%	−4%
Labour hold		Swing		

=== Everton ===
Everton
Party	Candidate	Votes	%	±%
Labour	David Nickson ^{(PARTY)}	2,941	64%	+6%
Conservative	William Thomas	1,570	34%	−8%
Communist	John William Clarke	97	2%	
Majority		1,371		
Registered electors		13,021		
Turnout		4,608	35%	−4%
Labour hold		Swing		

=== Exchange ===
Exchange
Party	Candidate	Votes	%	±%
Independent	John Gerard Granby	666	85%	+6%
Labour	Alexander Kay	121	15%	−6%
Majority		545		
Registered electors		1,575		
Turnout		787	50%	−5%
Independent hold		Swing	+6%	

=== Fairfield ===
Fairfield
Party	Candidate	Votes	%	±%
Conservative	Robert Meadows ^{(PARTY)}	4,491	65%	−1%
Labour	Edward William Harby	2,406	35%	+1%
Majority		2,085		
Registered electors		15,572		
Turnout		6,897	44%	−7%
Conservative hold		Swing		

=== Fazakerley ===
Fazakerley
Party	Candidate	Votes	%	±%
Labour	Joseph Morgan	5,100	52%	+6%
Conservative	Robert Charles Andrews ^{(PARTY)}	4,793	48%	−6%
Majority		307		
Registered electors		19,933		
Turnout		9,893	50%	−1%
Labour gain from Conservative		Swing	6%	

=== Garston ===
Garston
Party	Candidate	Votes	%	±%
Labour	Alexander Hardman	3,580	49%	+3%
Conservative	William Leslie McClelland ^{(PARTY)}	3,566	49%	−5%
Communist	Isaac Brickwood Pick	93	1%	
Majority		14		
Registered electors		18,575		
Turnout		7,239	39%	−18%
Labour gain from Conservative		Swing		

=== Granby ===
Granby
Party	Candidate	Votes	%	±%
Conservative	Walter Clarke ^{(PARTY)}	2,576	52%	−3%
Labour	Mrs Elizabeth Trainor	2,385	48%	+3%
Majority		191		
Registered electors		12,475		
Turnout		4,961	40%	−3%
Conservative hold		Swing		

=== Great George ===
Great George
Party	Candidate	Votes	%	±%
Labour	William G ingham	783	51%	+6%
Conservative	John Coupland	760	49%	−6%
Majority		23		
Registered electors				
Turnout		1,543		
Labour gain from Conservative		Swing		

=== Kensington ===
Kensington
Party	Candidate	Votes	%	±%
Conservative	Stephen Minion ^{(PARTY)}	3,199	54%	−2%
Labour	John Hamilton	2,402	41%	−3%
Liberal	Edward Kelly	295	5%	
Majority		797		
Registered electors		14,109		
Turnout		5,896	42%	−8%
Conservative hold		Swing	-2%	

=== Kirkdale ===
Kirkdale
Party	Candidate	Votes	%	±%
Labour	Howell James ^{(PARTY)}	4,134	53%	+1%
Conservative	Edward Shaw	3,670	47%	−1%
Majority		464		
Registered electors		19,840		
Turnout		7,804	39%	
Labour hold		Swing	+1%	

=== Little Woolton ===
Little Woolton
Party	Candidate	Votes	%	±%
Conservative	Eric Cuthbert Arden ^{(PARTY)}	1,173	62%	−22%
Labour	Roy Stoddart	704	38%	+24%
Majority		469		
Registered electors		3,018		
Turnout		1,877	62%	−6%
Conservative hold		Swing		

=== Low Hill ===
Low Hill
Party	Candidate	Votes	%	±%
Labour	John Mathew Taylor	2,685	52%	+7%
Conservative	John Keenan	2,478	48%	−7%
Majority		207		
Registered electors		11,944		
Turnout		5,163	43%	−6%
Labour gain from Conservative		Swing	7%	

=== Much Woolton ===
Much Woolton
Party	Candidate	Votes	%	±%
Conservative	Vivian Forsyth Crosthwaite	2,054	80%	+6%
Labour	William H. Sefton	509	20%	−6%
Majority		1,545		
Registered electors		5,790		
Turnout		2,563	43%	−15%
Conservative hold		Swing		

=== Netherfield ===
Netherfield
Party	Candidate	Votes	%	±%
Conservative & Protestant	Harry Victor Shaw	2,030	62%	−1%
Labour	Thomas Robinson	1,216	37%	
Communist	Sidney Foster	52	2%	
Majority		814		
Registered electors		10,012		
Turnout		3,298	33%	−4%
Conservative and Protestant hold		Swing		

=== North Scotland ===
North Scotland
Party	Candidate	Votes	%	±%
Labour	Joseph O'Neil	1,585	98%	+23%
Communist	John William Coward	30	2%	−5%
Majority		1,585		
Registered electors		7,154		
Turnout		1,615	23%	−10%
Labour hold		Swing	+23%	

=== Old Swan ===
Old Swan
Party	Candidate	Votes	%	±%
Conservative	Leslie Thomas Rogers	7,609	65%	−1%
Labour	Walter Duffy	3,994	34%	0%
Communist	Miss Winifred May George	164	1%	
Majority		3,615		
Registered electors		27,201		
Turnout		11,767	43%	−6%
Conservative hold		Swing		

=== Prince's Park ===
Prince's Park
Party	Candidate	Votes	%	±%
Conservative	William Browne ^{(PARTY)}	2,616	54%	−1%
Labour	Mrs Ethel May Wormald	2,156	44%	−1%
Communist	Mrs Evelyn Cohen	111	2%	
Majority		460		
Registered electors		12,012		
Turnout		4,883	41%	−9%
Conservative hold		Swing		

=== Sandhills ===
Sandhills
Party	Candidate	Votes	%	±%
Labour	Henry Alldritt	2,408	79%	+6%
Conservative	Frederick C. Hitches	645	21%	−6%
Majority		1,763		
Registered electors		7,961		
Turnout		3,053	38%	−3%
Labour hold		Swing		

=== St. Anne's ===
St. Anne's
Party	Candidate	Votes	%	±%
Labour	Mrs. Sarah Anne McArd	1,324	65%	+3%
Conservative	Miss Joan Ailsa Blackie	440	22%	−1%
Independent	Joseph Francis Fusco	270	13%	
Majority		884		
Registered electors		5,527		
Turnout		2,034	37%	−6%
Labour hold		Swing	+3%	

=== St. Domingo ===
St. Domingo
Party	Candidate	Votes	%	±%
Protestant	George Phipps ^{(PARTY)}	2,868	64%	+4%
Labour	Stanley Michael McGorian	1,608	36%	−4%
Majority		1,260		
Registered electors		13,070		
Turnout		4,476	34%	−8%
Protestant hold		Swing		

=== St. Peter's ===
St. Peter's
Party	Candidate	Votes	%	±%
Conservative	Mrs. Evaline Ida Bligh	414	58%	−12%
Labour	Thomas George Dominic McGuire	306	43%	+13%
Majority		108		
Registered electors		1,369		
Turnout		720	53%	+7%
Conservative hold		Swing		

=== Sefton Park East ===
Sefton Park East
Party	Candidate	Votes	%	±%
Conservative	John Nuttall Maxwell Entwistle ^{(PARTY)}	unopposed		
Conservative hold		Swing		

=== Sefton Park West ===
Sefton Park West
Party	Candidate	Votes	%	±%
Conservative	George Walter Pickles	4,037	76%	−2%
Labour	Richard John Alcock	1,310	24%	+2%
Majority		2,727		
Registered electors		10,913		
Turnout		5,347	49%	−2%
Conservative hold		Swing	-2%	

=== South Scotland ===
South Scotland - 2 seats
Party	Candidate	Votes	%	±%
Labour	Frederick Ernest Granby ^{(PARTY)}	2,053	97%	
Labour	Edward Corrigan ^{(PARTY)}	1,988	94%	
Communist	Dr. Cyril Taylor	66	3%	
Majority		1,987		
Registered electors		6,355		
Turnout		2,119	33%	
Labour gain from Conservative		Swing		

=== Vauxhall ===
Vauxhall
Party	Candidate	Votes	%	±%
Labour	Patrick O'Brien ^{(PARTY)}	598	69%	
Conservative	Sydney Charles Freeman	274	31%	0%
Majority		324		
Registered electors		2,736		
Turnout		872	32%	
Labour hold		Swing		

=== Walton ===
Walton
Party	Candidate	Votes	%	±%
Conservative	George Moore ^{(PARTY)}	5,767	58%	−2%
Labour	Walter Gibbs	4,131	42%	+2%
Majority		1,636		
Registered electors		23,033		
Turnout		9,898	43%	
Conservative hold		Swing	-2%	

=== Warbreck ===
Warbreck
Party	Candidate	Votes	%	±%
Conservative	Arthur Whitaker Lowe ^{(PARTY)}	5,220	69%	−2%
Labour	Ian Isidore Levin	2,319	31%	+2%
Majority		2,901		
Registered electors		19,085		
Turnout		7,539	40%	−7%
Conservative hold		Swing		

=== Wavertree ===
Wavertree - 2 seats
Party	Candidate	Votes	%	±%
Conservative	??????? Wilson	6,911	75%	
Conservative	Edward Jennings	6,863	75%	
Labour	Francis Burke	2,334	25%	
Labour	Mrs. ????? Wright	2,278	25%	
Majority		4,567		
Registered electors				
Turnout		9,255		
Conservative hold		Swing		
Conservative hold		Swing		

=== Wavertree West ===
Wavertree West
Party	Candidate	Votes	%	±%
Conservative	John James Merrigan ^{(PARTY)}	2,705	51%	−4%
Labour	Charles James Minton	2,609	49%	+4%
Majority		96		
Registered electors		11,539		
Turnout		5,314	46%	−8%
Conservative hold		Swing	-4%	

=== West Derby ===
West Derby
Party	Candidate	Votes	%	±%
Conservative	Alec James Garnock-Jones	8,679	69%	0%
Labour	William Indcox Jones	3,347	27%	−4%
Liberal	Cameron Melville	493	4%	
Majority		5,332		
Registered electors		31,444		
Turnout		12,519	40%	−11%
Conservative hold		Swing		

== By-elections ==
=== North Scotland, Thursday 22 November 1950 ===
Vacancy left by Cllr. Herbert F. Granby.

North Scotland
Party	Candidate	Votes	%	±%
Labour	Thomas Robinson	1,527	87%	−11%
Conservative	Leonard James Carr	234	13%	
Majority		1,293		
Registered electors		7,154		
Turnout		1,761	25%	+2%
Labour hold		Swing	-11%	
