= 1919 Liverpool City Council election =

Liverpool City Council elections 1919

- November 1, 1919

36 seats were up for election (one third): one seat for each of the 36 wards 73 (incl. Aldermen) seats needed for a majority

Elections to Liverpool City Council were held on 1 November 1919.

One third of the council seats were up for election. The term of office for each councillor being three years.

Ten of the thirty-six seats were uncontested.

After the election, the composition of the council was:

Party	Councillors	±	Aldermen	Total
Conservative	54	-9	26	80
Liberal	22	-2	6	28
Labour	20	+10	0	20
Irish Nationalist	13	+1	3	16
Independent	1	-1	0	1

== Election result ==
Liverpool local election result 1919
Party	Seats	Gains	Losses	Net gain/loss	Seats %	Votes %	Votes	+/−
Conservative	14	1	10	-9	38%	46%	43,994	
Labour	10	10	0	+10	29%	34%	32,751	
Liberal	4	0	1	-1	8.8%	8.5%	8,232	
Irish Nationalist	7	1	0	1		3.5%	3,538	
Independent	1	0	0	0				

Note there was one new seat.

== Ward results ==
* - Retiring Councillor seeking re-election

=== Abercromby ===
No. 9 Abercromby
Party	Candidate	Votes	%	±%
Conservative	Edwin Thompson *	1,439	58%	
S. & S.	John Bennie Baillie	1,038	42%	
Majority		401		
Registered electors		6,521		
Turnout		2,477	38%	
Conservative hold		Swing		

=== Aigburth ===
No. 17 Aigburth
Party	Candidate	Votes	%	±%
Conservative	Henry Morley Miller	unopposed		
Registered electors				
Conservative hold		Swing		

=== Allerton, Childwall & Little Woolton ===
No. 35 Allerton
Party	Candidate	Votes	%	±%
Conservative	Stanley Rimmer	572	42%	
Liberal	Charles James Williamson	463	34%	
Labour	William Richard Blair	315	23%	
Majority		109		
Registered electors		2,202		
Turnout		1,350	61%	
Conservative hold		Swing		

=== Anfield ===
No. 29 Anfield
Party	Candidate	Votes	%	±%
Labour	George Thompson Holliday	1,294	36%	
Conservative	Jane Ellen Richardson	1,276	35%	
Liberal	William Owen Thomas *	1,030	29%	
Majority		18		
Registered electors		8,706		
Turnout		3,600	41%	
Labour gain from Liberal		Swing		

=== Breckfield ===
No. 30 Breckfield
Party	Candidate	Votes	%	±%
Labour	Henry Alfred Booth	2,296	55%	
Conservative	Alfred Griffiths *	1,873	45%	
Majority		423		
Registered electors		9,269		
Turnout		4,169	45%	
Labour gain from Conservative		Swing		

=== Brunswick ===
No. 11 Brunswick
Party	Candidate	Votes	%	±%
Irish Nationalist	John Alfred Kelly *	2,403	74%	
Conservative	Margaret Mason	857	26%	
Majority		1,546		
Registered electors		7,261		
Turnout		3,260	45%	
Irish Nationalist hold		Swing		

=== Castle Street ===
No. 7 Castle Street
Party	Candidate	Votes	%	±%
Conservative	Frank Ambrose Goodwin	unopposed		
Registered electors				
Conservative hold		Swing		

=== Dingle ===
No. 12 Dingle
Party	Candidate	Votes	%	±%
Conservative	William Wallace Kelly *	3,594	66%	
Labour	William John Daniel	1,869	34%	
Majority		1,725		
Registered electors		12,830		
Turnout		5,463	43%	
Conservative hold		Swing		

=== Edge Hill ===
No. 18 Edge Hill
Party	Candidate	Votes	%	±%
Labour	Charles Burden	2,527	53%	
Conservative	Daniel Charles Williams *	2,240	47%	
Majority		287		
Registered electors		11,058		
Turnout		4,767	43%	
Labour gain from Conservative		Swing		

=== Everton ===
No. 21 Everton
Party	Candidate	Votes	%	±%
Labour	Henry Walker	2,974	63%	
Conservative	Charles Edward Pugh *	1,784	37%	
Majority		1,190		
Registered electors		11,010		
Turnout		4,758	43%	
Labour gain from Conservative		Swing		

=== Exchange ===
No. 5 Exchange
Party	Candidate	Votes	%	±%
Irish Nationalist	Peter Kavanagh	955	66%	
Conservative	Perring Thomas Stolterfoht *	486	34%	
Majority		469		
Registered electors		2,549		
Turnout		1,441	57%	
Irish Nationalist gain from Conservative		Swing		

=== Fairfield ===
No. 31 Fairfield
Party	Candidate	Votes	%	±%
Liberal	Joseph Lucas	unopposed		
Registered electors				
Liberal hold		Swing		

=== Fazakerley ===
No. 27 Fazakerley
Party	Candidate	Votes	%	±%
Conservative	Frank Quayle	701	58%	
Labour	Albert Nicholas Denaro	506	42%	
Majority		195		
Registered electors		2,421		
Turnout		1,207	50%	
Conservative win (new seat)				

=== Garston ===
No. 37 Garston
Party	Candidate	Votes	%	±%
Labour	James Henry Dutton	1,458	45%	
Conservative	Thomas Tushingham *	1,419	44%	
S & S	John George Baker	378	12%	
Majority		39		
Registered electors		5,114		
Turnout		3,255	64%	
Labour gain from Conservative		Swing		

=== Granby ===
No. 14 Granby
Party	Candidate	Votes	%	±%
Liberal	Joseph Harrison Jones *	1,922	59%	
Co-operative Party	Frederick James Norris	1,353	41%	
Majority		569		
Registered electors		8,293		
Turnout		3,275	39%	
Liberal hold		Swing		

=== Great George ===
No. 10 Great George
Party	Candidate	Votes	%	±%
Irish Nationalist	Thomas Owen Ruddin	unopposed		
Registered electors				
Irish Nationalist hold		Swing		

=== Kensington ===
No. 19 Kensington
Party	Candidate	Votes	%	±%
Labour	John Badlay	2,889	55%	
Conservative	Robert Lowry Burns *	2,366	45%	
Majority		523	10%	N/A
Registered electors		9,936		
Turnout		5,255	53%	
Labour gain from Conservative		Swing		

=== Kirkdale ===
No. 24 Kirkdale
Party	Candidate	Votes	%	±%
Conservative	Robert Garnett Sheldon *	2,971	49%	
Labour	Samuel Mason	2,813	46%	
Liberal	Joseph Edward Freeman	340	6%	
Majority		158		
Registered electors		14,107		
Turnout		6,124	43%	
Conservative hold		Swing		

=== Low Hill ===
No. 20 Low Hill
Party	Candidate	Votes	%	±%
Labour	Thomas Joseph Rowan	1,872	44%	
Conservative	Francis William Bailey *	1,729	40%	
Liberal	Joseph Masterson	672	16%	
Majority		143		
Registered electors		8,947		
Turnout		4,273	48%	
Labour gain from Conservative		Swing		

=== Netherfield ===
No. 22 Netherfield
Party	Candidate	Votes	%	±%
Independent	John Walker *	2,109	76%	
Coalition Labour	William Edward McLachlan	649	24%	
Majority		1,460		
Registered electors		10,152		
Turnout		2,758	27%	
Independent hold		Swing		

=== North Scotland ===
No. 2 North Scotland
Party	Candidate	Votes	%	±%
Irish Nationalist	John Clancy	unopposed		
Registered electors				
Irish Nationalist hold		Swing		

=== Old Swan ===
No. 32 Old Swan
Party	Candidate	Votes	%	±%
Labour	Herbert Edward Rose	2,162	50.4%	
Conservative	Thomas Henry Burton *	2,126	49.6%	
Majority		36		
Registered electors		9,548		
Turnout		4,288	45%	
Labour gain from Conservative		Swing		

=== Prince's Park ===
No. 13 Prince's Park
Party	Candidate	Votes	%	±%
Conservative	David Jackson *	2,365	64%	
Labour	John Hayes	1,330	36%	
Majority		1,035		
Registered electors		7,765		
Turnout		3,695	48%	
Conservative hold		Swing		

=== Sandhills ===
No. 1 Sandhills
Party	Candidate	Votes	%	±%
Irish Nationalist	Thomas Wafer Byrne	unopposed		
Registered electors				
Irish Nationalist hold		Swing		

=== St. Anne's ===
No. 6 St. Anne's
Party	Candidate	Votes	%	±%
Liberal	Philip Durning Holt	unopposed		
Registered electors				
Liberal hold		Swing		

=== St. Domingo ===
No. 23 St. Domingo
Party	Candidate	Votes	%	±%
Conservative	Thomas White *	1,991	52%	
Liberal	William Sydney Shaw	1,831	48%	
Majority		160		
Registered electors		9,920		
Turnout		3,822	39%	
Conservative hold		Swing		

=== St. Peter's ===
No. 8 St. Peter's
Party	Candidate	Votes	%	±%
Conservative	Henry Alexander Cole *	743	62%	
Labour	Edward Fergus	451	38%	
Majority		292		
Registered electors		2,549		
Turnout		1,194	47%	
Conservative hold		Swing		

=== Sefton Park East ===
No. 15 Sefton Park East
Party	Candidate	Votes	%	±%
Conservative	Arnold Rushton	2,261	53%	
Liberal	John Parry Edwards *	1,302	31%	
Co-operative Party	Annie Billinge	695	16%	
Majority		959		
Registered electors		8,104		
Turnout		4,258	53%	
Conservative hold		Swing		

=== Sefton Park West ===
No. 16 Sefton Park West
Party	Candidate	Votes	%	±%
Liberal	Herbert Reynolds Rathbone *	unopposed		
Registered electors				
Liberal hold		Swing		

=== South Scotland ===
No. 3 South Scotland
Party	Candidate	Votes	%	±%
Irish Nationalist	John O'Shea	unopposed		
Registered electors				
Irish Nationalist hold		Swing		

=== Vauxhall ===
No. 4 Vauxhall
Party	Candidate	Votes	%	±%
Irish Nationalist	Thomas Burke	unopposed		
Registered electors				
Irish Nationalist hold		Swing		

=== Walton ===
No. 25 Walton
Party	Candidate	Votes	%	±%
Conservative	Sydney Appleton Kelly *	3,177	55%	
Labour	Mercer Curtis	2,642	45%	
Majority		535		
Registered electors		11,292		
Turnout		5,819	52%	
Conservative hold		Swing		

=== Warbreck ===
No. 26 Warbreck
Party	Candidate	Votes	%	±%
Conservative	Robert Charles Herman *	2,588	61%	
Co-operative Party	Anna Blair	1,674	39%	
Majority		914		
Registered electors		10,391		
Turnout		4,262	41%	
Conservative hold		Swing		

=== Wavertree ===
No. 34 Wavertree
Party	Candidate	Votes	%	±%
Conservative	Peter Gill *	2,305	54%	
Labour	Albert Edward Johns	1,955	46%	
Majority		350		
Registered electors		9.065		
Turnout		4,260	47%	
Conservative hold		Swing		

=== Wavertree West ===
No. 33 Wavertree West
Party	Candidate	Votes	%	±%
Labour	William Augustus Colcutt	1,856	50.3%	
Conservative	John Glynn *	1,837	49.7%	
Majority		19		
Registered electors		7,653		
Turnout		3,693	48%	
Labour gain from Conservative		Swing		

=== West Derby ===
No. 28 West Derby
Party	Candidate	Votes	%	±%
Labour	Walter Percy Helm	1,542	41%	
Conservative	Albert James Muskett	1,294	34%	
Independent	Thomas Utley	957	25%	
Majority		248		
Registered electors		8,376		
Turnout		3,793	45%	
Labour gain from Conservative		Swing		

== Aldermanic Elections 10 November 1919 ==
Caused by the death on 9 September 1919 of Alderman John Duncan JP (Conservative, last elected as an alderman by the council on 9 November 1913)

In his place, Councillor Frederick Thomas Richardson (Labour, Edge Hill, elected unopposed 1 November 1914) Postal Official of 10 Fairfield Street, Liverpool was elected by the council as an alderman on 10 November 1919.

Party	Alderman	Ward	Term expires
Labour	Frederick Thomas Richardson	No. 21 Everton	1923

On 10 November 1919, Councillor William Albert Robinson (Labour, Garston, elected unopposed 1 November 1914) Trades Union Official of 13 St. Andrew Road, was elected by the council as the first alderman for the Fazakerley ward .

Party	Alderman	Ward	Term expires
Labour	William Albert Robinson	No. 27 Fazakerley	1923

=== Aldermanic Election 7 July 1920 ===
Caused by the resignation of Alderman Robert Stephen Porter (Conservative, appointed by the council as an alderman on 9 November 1916), which was reported to the council on 5 May 1920

In his place, Councillor John George Moyles JP (Party?, ward?, elected?) of 2 Bedford Road, Walton was elected, by the council as an alderman on 7 July 1920

Party	Alderman	Ward	Term expires
	John George Moyles JP	No. 34 Wavertree	1923

== By-elections ==
=== No. 18 Edge Hill, 26 November 1919 ===
Caused by the election as an alderman, by the council of Councillor Frederick Thomas Richardson (Labour, Edge Hill, elected unopposed 1 November 1914) on 10 November 1919, following the death on 9 September 1919 of Alderman John Duncan JP (Conservative, last elected as an alderman by the council on 9 November 1913)

No. 18 Edge Hill
Party	Candidate	Votes	%	±%
	Samuel Mason	2,759	52%	
	Daniel Charles Williams	2,516	48%	
Majority		243		
Registered electors				
Turnout		5,275		
		Swing		

=== No. 37 Garston, 26 November 1919 ===
Caused by the election, by the council, as an alderman on 10 November 1919 of Councillor William Albert Robinson (Labour, Garston, elected unopposed 1 November 1914).

No. 37 Garston
Party	Candidate	Votes	%	±%
	Albert Elijah Beavan	1,977	51%	
	Thomas Tushingham	1,879	49%	
Majority				
Registered electors				
Turnout		3,856		
		Swing		

=== No. 24 Sefton Park West ===
Caused by the resignation of Councillor Herbert Reynolds Rathbone (Liberal, elected unopposed 1 November 1919) which was reported to the council on 7 July 1920.

== See also ==
- Liverpool City Council
- Liverpool Town Council elections 1835 - 1879
- Liverpool City Council elections 1880–present
- Mayors and Lord Mayors of Liverpool 1207 to present
- History of local government in England
