= 1952 Liverpool City Council election =

1952 UK local election

- 8 May 1952
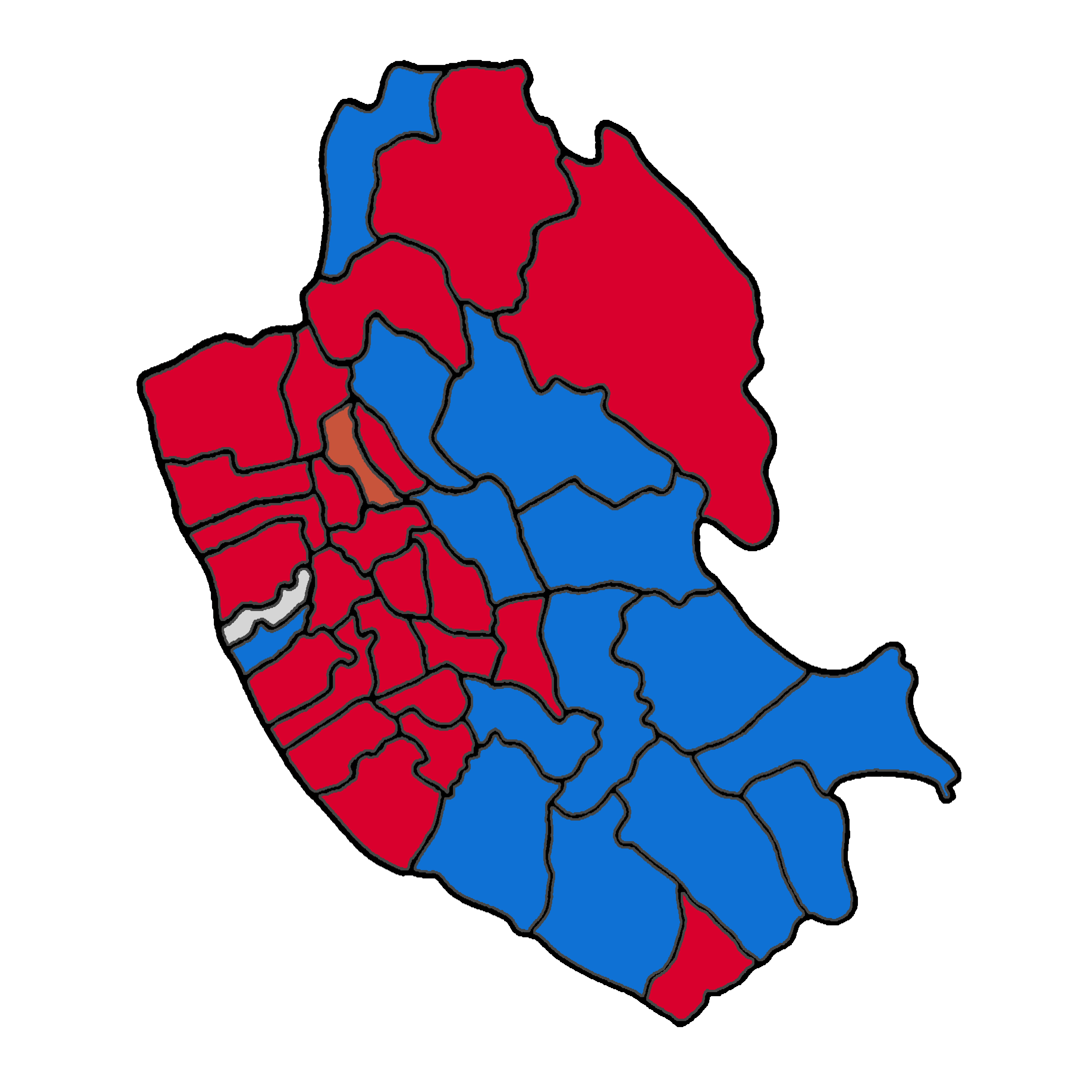
- Map of Liverpool showing wards won (first placed party)

Elections to Liverpool City Council were held on 8 May 1952.

After the election, the composition of the council was:

| Party | Councillors | ± | Aldermen | Total |
|---|---|---|---|---|
| Conservative | 67 | -12 | 28 | 95 |
| Labour | 46 | +13 | 7 | 53 |
| Protestant | 4 | -1 | 1 | 5 |
| Independent | 3 | 0 | 2 | 5 |
| Liberal | 0 | 0 | 2 | 2 |

== Election result ==
Liverpool local election result 1952
| Party | Seats | Gains | Losses | Net gain/loss | Seats % | Votes % | Votes | +/− |
|---|---|---|---|---|---|---|---|---|
| Labour | 26 | | | | 62% | 55% | 124,368 | |
| Conservative | 14 | | | | 33% | 45% | 102,558 | |
| Protestant | 1 | | | | 2.4% | 1.7% | 3,954 | |
| Liberal | 0 | 0 | 0 | 0 | 0% | 0.67% | 1,523 | |
| Communist | 0 | 0 | 0 | 0 | 0% | 0.032% | 72 | |

== Ward results ==
* - Councillor seeking re-election

^{(PARTY)} - Party of former Councillor

Comparisons are made with the 1949 election results.

=== Abercromby ===
Abercromby
| Party | Candidate | Votes | % | ±% |
|---|---|---|---|---|
| Labour | Harry Livermore | 3,564 | 62% | +20% |
| Conservative | John Kenneth Hart * | 2,159 | 38% | −16% |
| Majority | | 1,405 | | |
| Registered electors | | 13,256 | | |
| Turnout | | 5,723 | 43% | +5% |
| Labour gain from Conservative | | Swing | | |

=== Aigburth ===
Aigburth
| Party | Candidate | Votes | % | ±% |
|---|---|---|---|---|
| Conservative | William Alexander Kinnear * | 5,268 | 76% | 0% |
| Labour | Thomas George White | 935 | 14% | +3% |
| Liberal | John Bowen | 713 | 10% | −2% |
| Majority | | 4,333 | | |
| Registered electors | | 15,523 | | |
| Turnout | | 6,916 | 45% | −11% |
| Conservative hold | | Swing | | |

=== Allerton ===
Allerton
| Party | Candidate | Votes | % | ±% |
|---|---|---|---|---|
| Conservative | Charles Haswell * | 2,855 | 74% | +4% |
| Labour | Harold Lee | 995 | 26% | +7% |
| Majority | | 1,860 | | |
| Registered electors | | 9,739 | | |
| Turnout | | 3,850 | 40% | −10% |
| Conservative hold | | Swing | | |

=== Anfield ===
Anfield
| Party | Candidate | Votes | % | ±% |
|---|---|---|---|---|
| Conservative | Norman Alfred Pannell ^{(PARTY)} | 4,019 | 53% | −12% |
| Labour | James Augustus Bargrave Deane | 3,546 | 47% | +12% |
| Majority | | 473 | | |
| Registered electors | | 16,287 | | |
| Turnout | | 7,565 | 46% | −4% |
| Conservative hold | | Swing | | |

=== Breckfield ===
Breckfield
| Party | Candidate | Votes | % | ±% |
|---|---|---|---|---|
| Labour | William Ralph Snell | 3,094 | 55% | +13% |
| Conservative | Miss Joan Ailsa Blackie ^{(PARTY)} | 2,489 | 45% | −13% |
| Majority | | 605 | | |
| Registered electors | | 12,826 | | |
| Turnout | | 5,583 | 44% | −1% |
| Conservative hold | | Swing | | |

=== Brunswick ===
Brunswick
| Party | Candidate | Votes | % | ±% |
|---|---|---|---|---|
| Labour | Hugh Carr | 3,084 | 88% | +8% |
| Conservative | Mrs. Marrion Browne | 405 | 12% | −7% |
| Majority | | 2,679 | | |
| Registered electors | | 7,334 | | |
| Turnout | | 3,489 | 48% | −1% |
| Conservative gain from Labour | | Swing | | |

=== Castle Street ===
Castle Street
| Party | Candidate | Votes | % | ±% |
|---|---|---|---|---|
| Labour | Thomas Henry Thompson | 440 | 97% | |
| Independent | James Elias | 13 | 3% | |
| Majority | | 427 | | |
| Registered electors | | 956 | | |
| Turnout | | 453 | 47% | |
| Labour gain from Conservative | | Swing | | |

=== Childwall ===
Childwall - 2 seats
| Party | Candidate | Votes | % | ±% |
|---|---|---|---|---|
| Conservative | William James Sergent | 4,639 | 79% | |
| Conservative | John Shaw Brown | 4,419 | 75% | |
| Labour | William Delgarno | 1,246 | 21% | |
| Labour | Mrs. Elsie Ellen Gough | 1,232 | 21% | |
| Majority | | 3,393 | | |
| Registered electors | | 13,885 | | |
| Turnout | | 5,885 | 42% | |
| Conservative hold | | Swing | | |
| Conservative hold | | Swing | | |

=== Croxteth ===
Croxteth
| Party | Candidate | Votes | % | ±% |
|---|---|---|---|---|
| Labour | Charles McDonald | 9,692 | 63% | +13% |
| Conservative | Francis Henry Wilson * | 5,756 | 37% | −13% |
| Majority | | 3,933 | | |
| Registered electors | | 34,388 | | |
| Turnout | | 15,451 | 45% | +3% |
| Labour gain from Conservative | | Swing | | |

=== Dingle ===
Dingle
| Party | Candidate | Votes | % | ±% |
|---|---|---|---|---|
| Labour | William Firman Aldis * | 6,138 | 65% | |
| Conservative | Ernest Johnson | 3,238 | 35% | |
| Majority | | 2,900 | | |
| Registered electors | | 17,708 | | |
| Turnout | | 9,376 | 53% | −1% |
| Labour hold | | Swing | | |

=== Edge Hill ===
Edge Hill - 2 seats
| Party | Candidate | Votes | % | ±% |
|---|---|---|---|---|
| Labour | James Johnstone * | 3,699 | 67% | +11% |
| Labour | Leonard Holden | 3,587 | 65% | |
| Conservative | Edgar William Holland | 1,786 | 33% | −11% |
| Conservative | James Stanislaus Ross | 1,588 | 29% | −15% |
| Majority | | 1,913 | | |
| Registered electors | | 13,620 | | |
| Turnout | | 5,485 | 40% | −3% |
| Labour hold | | Swing | | |

=== Everton ===
Everton
| Party | Candidate | Votes | % | ±% |
|---|---|---|---|---|
| Labour | John Leslie Hughes * | 3,907 | 77% | +15% |
| Conservative | William Martin | 1,138 | 23% | −15% |
| Majority | | 2,769 | | |
| Registered electors | | 13,271 | | |
| Turnout | | 5,045 | 38% | −3% |
| Labour hold | | Swing | | |

=== Exchange ===
Exchange
| Party | Candidate | Votes | % | ±% |
|---|---|---|---|---|
| Independent | John Larkin | 598 | 62% | −19% |
| Labour | William McKeown | 368 | 38% | +19% |
| Majority | | 230 | | |
| Registered electors | | 15,505 | | |
| Turnout | | 966 | 6% | |
| Independent hold | | Swing | | |

=== Fairfield ===
Fairfield
| Party | Candidate | Votes | % | ±% |
|---|---|---|---|---|
| Conservative | William Thomas | 3,387 | 55% | −3% |
| Labour | Norman Bates | 2,799 | 45% | +3% |
| Majority | | 588 | | |
| Registered electors | | 15,505 | | |
| Turnout | | 6,186 | 40% | −2% |
| Conservative hold | | Swing | | |

=== Fazakerley ===
Fazakerley
| Party | Candidate | Votes | % | ±% |
|---|---|---|---|---|
| Labour | Hugh Dalton | 6,319 | 59% | +9% |
| Conservative | Ralph Rattray * | 4,432 | 41% | −9% |
| Majority | | 1,887 | | |
| Registered electors | | 19,797 | | |
| Turnout | | 10,751 | 54% | +2% |
| Labour gain from Conservative | | Swing | | |

=== Garston ===
Garston
| Party | Candidate | Votes | % | ±% |
|---|---|---|---|---|
| Labour | Brian Crookes | 7,650 | 66% | +19% |
| Conservative | William Leslie McClelland ^{(PARTY)} | 3,857 | 34% | −17% |
| Majority | | 3,793 | | |
| Registered electors | | 22,384 | | |
| Turnout | | 11,507 | 51% | +8% |
| Labour gain from Conservative | | Swing | | |

=== Granby ===
Granby
| Party | Candidate | Votes | % | ±% |
|---|---|---|---|---|
| Labour | William Thomas Brodie | 3,432 | 61% | +13% |
| Conservative | William Granville Heald * | 2,210 | 39% | −13% |
| Majority | | 1,222 | | |
| Registered electors | | 12,804 | | |
| Turnout | | 5,642 | 44% | +2% |
| Labour gain from Conservative | | Swing | | |

=== Great George ===
Great George
| Party | Candidate | Votes | % | ±% |
|---|---|---|---|---|
| Labour | Mrs. Elizabeth Trainor | 796 | 52% | +4% |
| Conservative | Walter John Smith | 747 | 48% | −4% |
| Majority | | 49 | | |
| Registered electors | | 3,376 | | |
| Turnout | | 1,543 | 46% | +3% |
| Labour gain from Conservative | | Swing | | |

=== Kensington ===
Kensington
| Party | Candidate | Votes | % | ±% |
|---|---|---|---|---|
| Labour | Frederick Walker | 3,683 | 59% | +13% |
| Conservative | Leslie John Henry Rumsey | 2,533 | 41% | −13% |
| Majority | | 1,150 | | |
| Registered electors | | 13,976 | | |
| Turnout | | 6,216 | 44% | −6% |
| Labour gain from Conservative | | Swing | | |

=== Kirkdale ===
Kirkdale
| Party | Candidate | Votes | % | ±% |
|---|---|---|---|---|
| Labour | Peter James O'Hare * | 5,699 | 71% | +18% |
| Conservative | George Parkinson Tyson | 2,381 | 29% | −18% |
| Majority | | 3,318 | | |
| Registered electors | | 19,721 | | |
| Turnout | | 8,080 | 41% | −6% |
| Labour hold | | Swing | | |

=== Little Woolton ===
Little Woolton
| Party | Candidate | Votes | % | ±% |
|---|---|---|---|---|
| Conservative | John Basil Smart ^{(PARTY)} | 1,153 | 57% | −6% |
| Labour | James Gardner | 866 | 43% | +6% |
| Majority | | 287 | | |
| Registered electors | | 3,048 | | |
| Turnout | | 2,019 | 66% | −1% |
| Conservative hold | | Swing | | |

=== Low Hill ===
Low Hill
| Party | Candidate | Votes | % | ±% |
|---|---|---|---|---|
| Labour | Fred Robinson * | 3,381 | 65% | +14% |
| Conservative | Abram Maxwell Caplin | 1,842 | 35% | −14% |
| Majority | | 1,539 | | |
| Registered electors | | 11,840 | | |
| Turnout | | 5,223 | 44% | 0% |
| Labour hold | | Swing | | |

=== Much Woolton ===
Much Woolton
| Party | Candidate | Votes | % | ±% |
|---|---|---|---|---|
| Conservative | Reginald William Stewart | 2,224 | 72% | −6% |
| Labour | Thomas Keith Williams | 846 | 28% | +6% |
| Majority | | 1,378 | | |
| Registered electors | | 6,525 | | |
| Turnout | | 3,070 | 47% | −5% |
| Labour hold | | Swing | | |

=== Netherfield ===
Netherfield
| Party | Candidate | Votes | % | ±% |
|---|---|---|---|---|
| Labour | Richard Clitherow | 1,925 | 55% | +15% |
| Protestant | William George Jones * | 1,555 | 45% | −14% |
| Majority | | 370 | | |
| Registered electors | | 10,107 | | |
| Turnout | | 3,480 | 34% | −5% |
| Labour gain from Protestant | | Swing | | |

=== North Scotland ===
North Scotland
| Party | Candidate | Votes | % | ±% |
|---|---|---|---|---|
| Labour | Thomas Robinson ^{(PARTY)} | | | |
| Majority | | | | |
| Registered electors | | 7,160 | | |
| Turnout | | | | |
| Labour hold | | Swing | | |

=== Old Swan ===
Old Swan
| Party | Candidate | Votes | % | ±% |
|---|---|---|---|---|
| Conservative | Leslie Hebron Sanders * | 5,926 | 54% | −11% |
| Labour | Terence Roberts | 4,989 | 46% | +12% |
| Majority | | 937 | | |
| Registered electors | | 27,025 | | |
| Turnout | | 10,915 | 40% | −7% |
| Conservative hold | | Swing | | |

=== Prince's Park ===
Prince's Park
| Party | Candidate | Votes | % | ±% |
|---|---|---|---|---|
| Labour | Henry Rimmer | 3,299 | 59% | +14% |
| Conservative | Charles Alfred Lever ^{(PARTY)} | 2,293 | 41% | −14% |
| Majority | | 1,006 | | |
| Registered electors | | 12,152 | | |
| Turnout | | 5,592 | 46% | +2% |
| Labour gain from Conservative | | Swing | | |

=== Sandhills ===
Sandhills
| Party | Candidate | Votes | % | ±% |
|---|---|---|---|---|
| Labour | Peter McKernan * - unopposed | | | |
| Majority | | | | |
| Registered electors | | | | |
| Turnout | | | | |
| Labour hold | | Swing | | |

=== St. Anne's ===
St. Anne's
| Party | Candidate | Votes | % | ±% |
|---|---|---|---|---|
| Labour | Mrs. Elizabeth Margaret Braddock * | 1,756 | 80% | +23% |
| Conservative | John Oswald Tiernan | 436 | 20% | −23% |
| Majority | | 1,320 | | |
| Registered electors | | 5,406 | | |
| Turnout | | 2,192 | 41% | −6% |
| Labour hold | | Swing | | |

=== St. Domingo ===
St. Domingo
| Party | Candidate | Votes | % | ±% |
|---|---|---|---|---|
| Protestant | Albert Victor Harris * | 2,399 | 51% | −7% |
| Labour | Frank Keating | 2,347 | 49% | +7% |
| Majority | | 52 | | |
| Registered electors | | 13,283 | | |
| Turnout | | 4,746 | 36% | −4% |
| Protestant hold | | Swing | | |

=== St. Peter's ===
St. Peter's
| Party | Candidate | Votes | % | ±% |
|---|---|---|---|---|
| Labour | William Smyth | 387 | 52% | +10% |
| Conservative | Leo Joseph G. Wilkinson * | 355 | 48% | −12% |
| Majority | | 32 | | |
| Registered electors | | 1,458 | | |
| Turnout | | 742 | 51% | 0% |
| Labour gain from Conservative | | Swing | | |

=== Sefton Park East ===
Sefton Park East
| Party | Candidate | Votes | % | ±% |
|---|---|---|---|---|
| Conservative | Harold Lees ^{(PARTY)} | 3,521 | 58% | −15% |
| Labour | Richard John Alcock | 2,596 | 42% | +15% |
| Majority | | 925 | | |
| Registered electors | | 14,049 | | |
| Turnout | | 6,117 | 44% | +2% |
| Conservative hold | | Swing | | |

=== Sefton Park West ===
Sefton Park West
| Party | Candidate | Votes | % | ±% |
|---|---|---|---|---|
| Conservative | Arthur Brierley Collins * | 3,668 | 64% | −9% |
| Labour | William Jones | 2,029 | 36% | +9% |
| Majority | | 1,639 | | |
| Registered electors | | 10,880 | | |
| Turnout | | 5,697 | 52% | −2% |
| Conservative hold | | Swing | | |

=== South Scotland ===
South Scotland
| Party | Candidate | Votes | % | ±% |
|---|---|---|---|---|
| Labour | Richard Corrigan ^{(PARTY)} | 2,295 | 97% | 0% |
| Communist | Richard Cuerdon | 72 | 3% | 0% |
| Majority | | 2,295 | | |
| Registered electors | | 6,781 | | |
| Turnout | | 2,367 | 35% | −14% |
| Labour hold | | Swing | | |

=== Vauxhall ===
Vauxhall
| Party | Candidate | Votes | % | ±% |
|---|---|---|---|---|
| Labour | Thomas Hogan | 785 | 72% | |
| Conservative | Alan Arthur Horsford | 303 | 28% | |
| Majority | | 482 | | |
| Registered electors | | 2,785 | | |
| Turnout | | 1,088 | 39% | |
| Labour hold | | Swing | | |

=== Walton ===
Walton
| Party | Candidate | Votes | % | ±% |
|---|---|---|---|---|
| Labour | John Francis Carr | 5,832 | 55% | |
| Conservative | Robert Charles Andrews | 4,820 | 45% | |
| Majority | | 1,012 | | |
| Registered electors | | 22,918 | | |
| Turnout | | 10,652 | 46% | |
| Labour hold | | Swing | | |

=== Warbreck ===
Warbreck
| Party | Candidate | Votes | % | ±% |
|---|---|---|---|---|
| Conservative | Frank Woolfenden | 4,793 | 55% | |
| Labour | Harold Dailey | 3,924 | 45% | |
| Majority | | 869 | | |
| Registered electors | | 18,812 | | |
| Turnout | | 8,717 | 46% | |
| Conservative hold | | Swing | | |

=== Wavertree ===
Wavertree
| Party | Candidate | Votes | % | ±% |
|---|---|---|---|---|
| Conservative | Mrs. Eleanor Bingham Glazebrook | 5,983 | 61% | |
| Labour | Emmanuel Milton Mannheim | 2,986 | 31% | |
| Liberal | Albert Edward Jones | 810 | 8% | |
| Majority | | 2,997 | | |
| Registered electors | | 21,744 | | |
| Turnout | | 9,779 | 45% | |
| Conservative hold | | Swing | | |

=== Wavertree West ===
Wavertree West
| Party | Candidate | Votes | % | ±% |
|---|---|---|---|---|
| Labour | Charles Minton | 3,545 | 58% | |
| Conservative | Samuel Curtis | 2,619 | 42% | |
| Majority | | 926 | | |
| Registered electors | | 11,342 | | |
| Turnout | | 6,164 | 54% | |
| Labour hold | | Swing | | |

=== West Derby ===
West Derby
| Party | Candidate | Votes | % | ±% |
|---|---|---|---|---|
| Conservative | John Gwilym Hughes | 7,762 | 57% | |
| Labour | Alexander Coveney McLeod | 5,907 | 43% | |
| Majority | | 1,855 | | |
| Registered electors | | 31,320 | | |
| Turnout | | 13,669 | 44% | |
| Conservative hold | | Swing | | |

== Aldermanic Elections ==
Twenty of the forty Aldermen were elected by the city council on 19 May 1952.

* - re-elected aldermen.

| Party | Alderman |
|---|---|
| Conservative | George Webster Green Armour * |
| Conservative | Reginald Richard Bailey * |
| Conservative | Herbert Neville Bewley * |
| Conservative | Mrs. Ada Martha Burton * |
| Conservative | Thomas Henry Burton * |
| Labour | Joseph Jackson Cleary * |
| Conservative | Alexander Critchley * |
| Conservative | Mabel Fletcher * |
| Conservative | Robert Duncan French * |
| Labour | Alexander Griffin * |
| Liberal | William Sinclair Scott Hannay * |
| Labour | Joseph Harrington * |
| Labour | Bertie Victor Kirby C.B.E. * |
| Conservative | Walter Thomas Lancashire * |
| Conservative | Alfred Levy * |
| Labour | David Gilbert Logan C.B, E. M.P. * |
| Protestant | Rev. Harry Dixon Longbottom * |
| Conservative | George Miller Platt * |
| Labour | Michael John Reppion * |
| Conservative | John Village * |

All Aldermen and the wards they were allocated to as Returning Officer are shown in the table below:

| Party | Alderman | Ward |
|---|---|---|
| | Edwin Thompson | Abercromby |
| | Ernest Ash Cookson | Aigburth |
| Conservative | Alexander Critchley | Allerton |
| | James Conrad Cross | Anfield |
| Protestant | Rev. Harry Dixon Longbottom | Breckfield |
| | William John Mathew Clark | Brunswick |
| | William John Tristram | Castle Street |
| Labour | Alexander Griffin | Childwall |
| Labour | David Gilbert Logan C.B.E. M.P. | Croxteth |
| Conservative | George Webster Green Armour | Dingle |
| Conservative | Alfred Levy | Edge Hill |
| Labour | Michael John Reppion | Everton |
| | William Greenough Gregson | Exchange |
| Conservative | George Miller Platt | Fairfield |
| | Lawrence King | Fazakerley |
| Conservative | Thomas Henry Burton | Garston |
| Labour | Bertie Victor Kirby C.B.E. | Granby |
| | Sir Alfred Shennan | Great George |
| Liberal | William Sinclair Scott Hannay | Kensington |
| Labour | Joseph Harrington | Kirkdale |
| | Isaac Robinson | Little Woolton |
| | William Thomas Roberts | Low Hill |
| | Joseph Williams | Much Woolton |
| Conservative | Walter Thomas Lancashire | Netherfield |
| | James Farrell | North Scotland |
| | Charles Gordon Snowden Gordon | Old Swan |
| | Albert Morrow | Prince's Park |
| | Robert John Hall | St. Anne's |
| | Luke Hogan M.B.E. | St. Domingo |
| Conservative | Robert Duncan French | St. Peter's |
| | Miss Mary Mabel Eills | Sandhills |
| Conservative | Reginald Richard Bailey | Sefton Park East |
| | Michael Corey Dixon | Sefton Park West |
| | Mr. Vere Egerton Cotton C.B.E. T.D. | South Scotland |
| | Stanley Ronald Williams | Vauxhall |
| Conservative | Miss Mabel Fletcher | Walton |
| Conservative | Mrs. Ada Martha Burton | Warbreck |
| Conservative | John Village | Wavertree |
| Labour | Joseph Jackson Cleary | Wavertree West |
| Conservative | Herbert Neville Bewley | Weat Derby |

== By-elections ==
=== Breckfield by-election 13 November 1952 ===
Following the death of Alderman Walter Thomas Lancashire on 18 August 1952, Cllr. David John Lewis was elected as Alderman by the City Council on 3 September 1952 and assigned as returning officer for the Netherfield ward.

Following the death of Alderman James Conrad Cross on 18 August 1952, Cllr. George William Prout was elected as Alderman by the City Council on 3 September 1952 and assigned as returning officer to the Anfield ward.

Following the election of Cllr. David John Lewis and Cllr. George William Prout as Aldermen, there was a by-election for 2 seats for the Breckfield ward on 13 November 1952.

Breckfield
| Party | Candidate | Votes | % | ±% |
|---|---|---|---|---|
| Conservative | Samuel Curtis | 2,511 | 52% | |
| Conservative | William Bell Pickett | 2,474 | 52% | |
| Labour | Ian Isidore Levin | 2,275 | 48% | |
| Labour | Andrew Thomas Francis Williams | 2,272 | 47% | |
| Majority | | 236 | | |
| Registered electors | | 12,826 | | |
| Turnout | | 4,786 | 37% | |
| Conservative hold | | Swing | | |
| Conservative hold | | Swing | | |
