= Mabel Fletcher =

Mabel Fletcher (died 1955) was an English local politician, the first woman alderman.

A "keen Tory", Fletcher was a member of the Ladies Branch of the Liverpool Civic Service League (CSL). She was elected to Liverpool City Council in 1919. She died in hospital at Fazakerley, Liverpool on 2 December 1955.

She has sometimes been confused with Muriel E. Fletcher, author of the 1930 'Fletcher report' on racial mixing in Liverpool.
