= Much Woolton (Liverpool ward) =

Ward in Liverpool

Coordinates: 53.3967°N 2.8888°W

- Suburban Area
- Location within Merseyside
- OS grid reference: SJ412889
  - London: 179 mi (288 km) South
- Metropolitan borough: City of Liverpool
- Metropolitan county: Merseyside
- Region: North West
- Country: England
- Sovereign state: United Kingdom
- Post town: LIVERPOOL
- Postcode district: L25
- Dialling code: 0151
- Police: Merseyside
- Fire: Merseyside
- Ambulance: North West
- UK Parliament: Liverpool Wavertree

Much Woolton is a historic area in Liverpool, located in Merseyside, England, and part of the Liverpool Wavertree parliamentary constituency. Much Woolton is bordered by the suburbs of Allerton to the south, Hunt's Cross to the southeast, and Childwall to the north. It was historically part of Lancashire before the creation of Merseyside. The area is known for its parks and landmarks such as the Church of St Peter and St Paul.

== Overview ==
Much Woolton ward was an electoral division of Liverpool City Council covering the Woolton Village area, created in 1918 and abolished in the 1953 boundary review to merge into the expanded Woolton ward. Initially represented by a single councillor, its representation grew to two seats by 1920 and three seats by 1929, reflecting local population growth. Elections were suspended during World War II from 1939 to 1944 due to the conflict . Notable councillors included John Hinshaw, Robert Gladstone and Caroline Whiteley—the first woman to represent the ward . After abolition, Much Woolton’s territory formed part of Woolton ward (1953–2023) and, since 2023, falls within the new Much Woolton & Hunts Cross ward.

== Elections ==
=== 1919 ===
No. 35 Much Woolton
Party	Candidate	Votes	%	±%
Conservative	John Buchanan Hinshaw	unopposed		
Registered electors				
Conservative win (new seat)				

=== 1920 ===
No. 36 Much Woolton
Party	Candidate	Votes	%	±%
Conservative	Thomas Harrison	756	63%	
Labour	Charles Jabez Edwards	438	37%	
Majority		318		
Registered electors		1,585		
Turnout		1,194	75%	
Conservative hold		Swing		

=== 1921 ===
No. 36 Much Woolton
Party	Candidate	Votes	%	±%
National Liberal	Robert Gladstone	776	62%	
Labour	Charles Jabez Edwards	475	38%	
Majority		301		
Registered electors		1,600		
Turnout		1,251	78%	
National Liberal hold		Swing		

=== 1923 ===
No. 36 Much Woolton
Party	Candidate	Votes	%	±%
Conservative	John Francis Roskell Reynolds	unopposed		
Registered electors				
Conservative hold		Swing		

=== 1924 ===
No. 36 Much Woolton
Party	Candidate	Votes	%	±%
Independent	Robert Gladstone *	785	69%	
Labour	Charles Jabez Edwards	346	31%	
Majority		439		
Registered electors		1,691		
Turnout		1,131	67%	
Independent gain from National Liberal		Swing		

=== 1926 ===
No. 36 Much Woolton
Party	Candidate	Votes	%	±%
Conservative	John Francis Roskell Reynolds *	600	69%	
Labour	William Henry Paulson	271	31%	
Majority		329		
Registered electors		1,735		
Turnout		871	50%	
Conservative hold		Swing		

=== 1927 ===
No. 36 Much Woolton
Party	Candidate	Votes	%	±%
Conservative	William Edward Stirling Napier	683	72%	
Labour	Frederick Stapleton	262	28%	
Majority		421		
Registered electors		1,801		
Turnout		945	52%	
Conservative gain from Independent		Swing		

=== 1929 ===
No. 36 Much Woolton
Party	Candidate	Votes	%	±%
Conservative	Charles Stuart Pethick *	773	55%	
Conservative	John Francis Roskell Reynolds *	736	53%	
Labour	John Reginald Bevins	513	37%	
Labour	Robert Edward Cottier	495	36%	
Liberal	Edward Alexander Ferguson	108	8%	
Majority		260		
Registered electors		2,046		
Turnout		1,394	68%	
Conservative hold		Swing		
Conservative hold		Swing		

=== 1930 ===
No. 36 Much Woolton
Party	Candidate	Votes	%	±%
Conservative	William Edward Stirling Napier *	753	74%	
Labour	William Robert Snell	258	26%	
Majority		495		
Registered electors		2,136		
Turnout		1,011	47%	
Conservative hold		Swing		

=== 1931 ===
No. 36 Much Woolton
Party	Candidate	Votes	%	±%
Conservative	Herbert Neville Bewley	885	52%	
Independent	Ernest Whiteley	821	48%	
Majority		64	4%	
Registered electors		2,299		
Turnout		1,706	74%	
Conservative hold		Swing		

=== 1932 ===
No. 36 Much Woolton
Party	Candidate	Votes	%	±%
Independent	Mrs. Caroline Whiteley	850	52%	
Conservative	Edwin Phillips Thompson	740	45%	
Labour	Arthur Lumb	52	3.2%	
Independent Democratic Labour	Patrick O'Brien Hendley	7	3.2%	
Majority		110		
Registered electors		2,371		
Turnout		1,649	70%	
Independent gain from Conservative		Swing		

=== 1933 ===
No. 36 Much Woolton
Party	Candidate	Votes	%	±%
Conservative	Joseph Butterfield	759	46%	
Independent	Ernest Whiteley	745	45%	
Labour	John Reginald Bevins	163	10%	
Majority		14		
Registered electors		2,558		
Turnout		1,667	65%	
Conservative hold		Swing		

=== 1934 ===
No. 36 Much Woolton
Party	Candidate	Votes	%	±%
Independent	Ernest Whitley	731	40%	
Conservative	Isaac Robinson	724	40%	
Ratepayers	Charles Frederick Hind	227	12%	
Labour	Andre John Holman	140	8%	
Majority		7		
Registered electors		2,591		
Turnout		1,822	70%	
Independent gain from Conservative		Swing		

=== 1935 ===
No. 36 Much Woolton
Party	Candidate	Votes	%	±%
Conservative	Isaac Robinson	1,013	51%	
Independent	Mrs. Caroline Whiteley *	853	43%	
Liberal	John Richard Jones	123	6%	
Majority		160		
Registered electors		2,747		
Turnout		1,989	72%	
Conservative gain from Independent		Swing		

=== 1936 ===
No. 36 Much Woolton
Party	Candidate	Votes	%	±%
Conservative	Joseph Butterfield *	1,104	77%	
Labour	William Smith Fraser	331	23%	
Majority		773		
Registered electors		2,828		
Turnout		1,435	51%	
Conservative hold		Swing		

=== 1937 ===
No. 36 Much Woolton
Party	Candidate	Votes	%	±%
Conservative	Vivian Forsyth Crosthwaite *	1,453	71%	
Labour	Andrew Campbell	586	29%	
Majority		867		
Registered electors		2,911		
Turnout		2,039	70%	
Conservative hold		Swing		

=== 1938 ===
No. 36 Much Woolton
Party	Candidate	Votes	%	±%
Conservative	Isaac Robinson *	1,144	76%	
Labour	Daniel Whelan	359	24%	
Majority		785		
Registered electors		2,975		
Turnout		1,503	51%	
Conservative hold		Swing		

=== 1945 ===
Much Woolton
Party	Candidate	Votes	%	±%
Conservative	Reginald Wm. Stewart	1,541	59%	
Labour	Griffith D. Ellis	1,084	41%	
Majority		457		
Registered electors		5,180		
Turnout		2,625	51%	

=== 1946 ===
Much Woolton
Party	Candidate	Votes	%	±%
Conservative	Vivian Forsyth Crosthwaite	1,886	63%	
Labour	Griffith Daniel Ellis	1,128	37%	
Majority		758		
Registered electors		5,387		
Turnout		3,014	56%	

=== 1947 ===
Much Woolton
Party	Candidate	Votes	%	±%
Conservative	Isaac Robinson	2,331	74%	
Labour	Noel Arthur Pinches	838	26%	
Majority		1,493		
Registered electors		5,463		
Turnout		3,169	58%	
Conservative hold		Swing		

=== 1949 ===
Much Woolton
Party	Candidate	Votes	%	±%
Conservative	Reginald William Stewart *	2,261	78%	+19%
Labour	Noel Arthur Pinches	646	22%	−19%
Majority		1,615		
Registered electors		5,547		
Turnout		2,907	52%	−1%
Conservative hold		Swing	+19%	

=== 1950 ===
Much Woolton
Party	Candidate	Votes	%	±%
Conservative	Vivian Forsyth Crosthwaite	2,054	80%	+6%
Labour	William H. Sefton	509	20%	−6%
Majority		1,545		
Registered electors		5,790		
Turnout		2,563	43%	−15%
Conservative hold		Swing		

=== 1951 ===
Much Woolton
Party	Candidate	Votes	%	±%
Conservative	Joseph Norton ^{(PARTY)}	2,399	82%	+8%
Labour	Alan Frank Skinner	523	18%	−8%
Majority		1,876		
Registered electors		6,367		
Turnout		2,922	46%	−8%
Conservative hold		Swing	+8%	

=== 1952 ===
Much Woolton
Party	Candidate	Votes	%	±%
Conservative	Reginald William Stewart	2,224	72%	−6%
Labour	Thomas Keith Williams	846	28%	+6%
Majority		1,378		
Registered electors		6,525		
Turnout		3,070	47%	−5%
Labour hold		Swing		

1918–1919 (1 seat): John Hinshaw (Conservative) served as the inaugural councillor, elected unopposed in both the 1918 and 1919 elections .

1920–1928 (2 seats): A second seat was added for the 1920 election, with Thomas Harrison (Conservative) joining John Hinshaw. Thereafter, representations included Robert Gladstone (National Liberal/Independent) alongside Harrison or John Reynolds (Conservative) in successive years .

1929 onwards (3 seats): A third councillor position was introduced in 1929; early holders included Charles Pethick (Conservative) alongside William Napier and John Reynolds. By 1932, Caroline Whiteley became the first woman to represent the ward, serving as an Independent councillor.

No elections were held between 1939 and 1944 as a result of the Second World War, with sitting councillors’ terms extended under wartime legislation.

Post‑war representation: After wartime suspension, Reginald Stewart (Conservative) held one of the three seats from 1945 until the ward’s abolition in 1952.

Woolton ward (1953–2023): Covered an expanded area including former Much and Little Woolton, remaining a three‑member ward until 2023.

== Historical and geography ==
The ward was officially established in 1918 to represent the Woolton Village area in the south‑east of Liverpool . Woolton Village itself stands approximately 2 miles north‑north‑east of Garston railway station and about 5 miles south‑east of Liverpool city centre, historically part of the Much Woolton township in the parish of Childwall, Lancashire.

In its early years, Much Woolton ward covered the main thoroughfares and residential streets of the village, reflecting its role as a suburban district within the County Borough of Liverpool. The ward fell within the Liverpool Garston parliamentary constituency throughout its existence. The 1953 Liverpool City Council election implemented widespread boundary changes under the Local Government Act 1952, resulting in the deletion of several wards, including Much Woolton. In its place, Little Woolton and Much Woolton wards were combined to form the new Woolton ward, which elected three councillors from 7 May 1953.
