= 1878 Liverpool Town Council election =

English local election

| ← 1877 | November 1, 1878 | 1879 → |

16 seats were up for election: one seat for each of the 16 wards 33 (incl. Aldermen) seats needed for a majority

Elections to Liverpool Town Council were held on Saturday 1 November 1878. One third of the council seats were up for election, the term of office of each councillor being three years.

Seven of the sixteen wards were uncontested.

After the election, the composition of the council was:

| Party | Councillors | ± | Aldermen | Total |
|---|---|---|---|---|
| Conservative | ?? | ?? | ?? | ?? |
| Liberal | ?? | ?? | ?? | ?? |
| Irish Home Rule | 5 | +1 | 0 | 5 |

== Election result ==
Liverpool local election result 1878
| Party | Seats | Gains | Losses | Net gain/loss | Seats % | Votes % | Votes | +/− |
|---|---|---|---|---|---|---|---|---|
| Conservative | 8 | 2 | 2 | 0 | 50% | 51% | 9.956 | |
| Liberal | 6 | 2 | 3 | -1 | 38% | 49% | 9,575 | |
| Home Rule | 2 | 1 | 0 | +1 | 12% | 0% | 0 | |

Given the significant number of uncontested wards, these statistics should be read in that context.

== Ward results ==
* - Retiring Councillor seeking re-election

=== Abercromby ===
No. 11 Abercromby
| Party | Candidate | Votes | % | ±% |
|---|---|---|---|---|
| Conservative | Anthony Bower * | unopposed | | |
| Registered electors | | 2,612 | | |
| Conservative hold | | Swing | | |

=== Castle Street ===
No. 6 Castle Street
| Party | Candidate | Votes | % | ±% |
|---|---|---|---|---|
| Liberal | William Crosfield * | 656 | 52% | |
| Conservative | Lawrence Hodson Parr | 609 | 48% | |
| Majority | | 47 | 4% | |
| Registered electors | | 1,802 | | |
| Turnout | | 1,265 | 70% | |
| Liberal hold | | Swing | | |

=== Everton ===
No. 1 Everton
| Party | Candidate | Votes | % | ±% |
|---|---|---|---|---|
| Conservative | James Barkeley Smith | unopposed | | |
| Registered electors | | 19,910 | | |
| Conservative hold | | Swing | | |

=== Exchange ===
No. 5 Exchange
| Party | Candidate | Votes | % | ±% |
|---|---|---|---|---|
| Liberal | Thomas Holder * | unopposed | | |
| Registered electors | | 2,067 | | |
| Liberal hold | | Swing | | |

=== Great George ===
No. 9 Great George
| Party | Candidate | Votes | % | ±% |
|---|---|---|---|---|
| Liberal | John Hampden Jackson | 575 | 54% | |
| Conservative | John Hughes * | 495 | 46% | |
| Majority | | 80 | 8% | N/A |
| Registered electors | | 1,329 | | |
| Turnout | | 1,070 | 81% | |
| Liberal gain from Conservative | | Swing | | |

=== Lime Street ===
No. 12 Lime Street
| Party | Candidate | Votes | % | ±% |
|---|---|---|---|---|
| Conservative | Edward Grindley | 746 | 51% | |
| Liberal | Charles James Crosfield | 706 | 49% | |
| Majority | | 40 | 2% | |
| Registered electors | | 1,955 | | |
| Turnout | | 1,452 | 74% | |
| Conservative hold | | Swing | | |

=== North Toxteth ===
No. 16 North Toxteth
| Party | Candidate | Votes | % | ±% |
|---|---|---|---|---|
| Conservative | Richard Fell Steble * | unopposed | | |
| Registered electors | | 7,444 | | |
| Conservative hold | | Swing | | |

=== Pitt Street ===
No. 8 Pitt Street
| Party | Candidate | Votes | % | ±% |
|---|---|---|---|---|
| Liberal | James Steel | 378 | 55% | |
| Conservative | Horatio Syred | 304 | 45% | |
| Majority | | 74 | 10% | N/A |
| Registered electors | | 847 | | |
| Turnout | | 682 | 81% | |
| Liberal gain from Conservative | | Swing | | |

=== Rodney Street ===
No. 10 Rodney Street
| Party | Candidate | Votes | % | ±% |
|---|---|---|---|---|
| Liberal | Thomas Brocklebank the younger * | 937 | 51% | |
| Conservative | Edmund Buckley | 905 | 49% | |
| Majority | | 32 | 2% | |
| Registered electors | | 2,572 | | |
| Turnout | | 1,842 | 72% | |
| Liberal hold | | Swing | | |

=== St. Anne Street ===
No. 13 St. Anne Street
| Party | Candidate | Votes | % | ±% |
|---|---|---|---|---|
| Conservative | Thomas Hayes Sheen | 1,165 | 51% | |
| Liberal | Ronald McDougall * | 1,109 | 49% | |
| Majority | | 56 | 2% | N/A |
| Registered electors | | 2,944 | | |
| Turnout | | 2,274 | 77% | |
| Conservative gain from Liberal | | Swing | | |

=== St. Paul's ===
No. 4 St. Paul's
| Party | Candidate | Votes | % | ±% |
|---|---|---|---|---|
| Conservative | Owen Hugh Williams * | 739 | 53% | |
| Liberal | David Hughes | 647 | 47% | |
| Majority | | 92 | 6% | |
| Registered electors | | 1,770 | | |
| Turnout | | 1,386 | 78% | |
| Conservative hold | | Swing | | |

=== St. Peter's ===
No. 7 St. Peter's
| Party | Candidate | Votes | % | ±% |
|---|---|---|---|---|
| Liberal | Charles Tricks Bowring * | unopposed | | |
| Registered electors | | 1,494 | | |
| Liberal hold | | Swing | | |

=== Scotland ===
No. 2 Scotland
| Party | Candidate | Votes | % | ±% |
|---|---|---|---|---|
| Home Rule | Laurence Connolly * | unopposed | | |
| Registered electors | | 9,671 | | |
| Home Rule hold | | Swing | | |

=== South Toxteth ===
No. 15 South Toxteth
| Party | Candidate | Votes | % | ±% |
|---|---|---|---|---|
| Conservative | Joseph Ball | 1,870 | 51% | |
| Liberal | John Evans | 1,783 | 49% | |
| Majority | | 87 | 2% | |
| Registered electors | | 5,862 | | |
| Turnout | | 3,653 | 62% | |
| Conservative hold | | Swing | | |

=== Vauxhall ===
No. 3 Vauxhall
| Party | Candidate | Votes | % | ±% |
|---|---|---|---|---|
| Home Rule | Charles McArdle | unopposed | | |
| Registered electors | | 2,146 | | |
| Home Rule gain from Liberal | | Swing | | |

=== West Derby ===
No. 14 West Derby
| Party | Candidate | Votes | % | ±% |
|---|---|---|---|---|
| Conservative | William John Lunt | 3,123 | 53% | |
| Liberal | William Durning Holt * | 2,784 | 47% | |
| Majority | | 339 | 6% | N/A |
| Registered electors | | 9,008 | | |
| Turnout | | 5,907 | 66% | |
| Conservative gain from Liberal | | Swing | | |

== By-elections ==
=== No. 9, Great George ===
Caused by John Hampden Jackson (Liberal, Great George, elected 1 November 1878) ceasing to be a Councillor.

No. 9 Great George
| Party | Candidate | Votes | % | ±% |
|---|---|---|---|---|
| Liberal | Samuel Bennett Jackson | 580 | 54% | |
| Conservative | John Hughes | 493 | 46% | |
| Majority | | 87 | 8% | |
| Registered electors | | 1,329 | | |
| Turnout | | 1,073 | 81% | |
| Liberal hold | | Swing | | |

=== No. 13, St. Anne Street ===
Caused by Thomas Hayes Sheen (Conservative, St. Anne Street, elected 1 November 1878) ceasing to be a Councillor.

No. 13 St. Anne Street
| Party | Candidate | Votes | % | ±% |
|---|---|---|---|---|
| Liberal | Ronald McDougall | 1,087 | 50.3% | |
| Conservative | Thomas Patrick Holden | 1,072 | 49.7% | |
| Majority | | 15 | 0.6% | N/A |
| Registered electors | | 2,944 | | |
| Turnout | | 2,159 | 73% | |
| Liberal gain from Conservative | | Swing | | |

== See also ==
- Liverpool City Council
- Liverpool Town Council elections 1835 - 1879
- Liverpool City Council elections 1880–present
- Mayors and Lord Mayors of Liverpool 1207 to present
- History of local government in England
