= 1876 Liverpool Town Council election =

English local election

← 1875	November 1, 1876	1877 →

16 seats were up for election: one seat for each of the 16 wards 33 (incl. Aldermen) seats needed for a majority

Elections to Liverpool Town Council were held on Wednesday 1 November 1876. One third of the council seats were up for election, the term of office of each councillor being three years.

Ten of the sixteen wards were uncontested.

After the election, the composition of the council was:

Party	Councillors	±	Aldermen	Total
Conservative	28	0	16	44
Liberal	15	-3	0	15
Irish Home Rule	3	+2	0	3

== Election result ==
Liverpool local election result 1879
Party	Seats	Gains	Losses	Net gain/loss	Seats %	Votes %	Votes	+/−
Conservative	9 ?					19%	1,755	
Liberal	4 ?	0	2	-2	25%	47%	4,265	
Home Rule	2	2	0	+2	12%	33%	2,986	

Because of the large number of contested seats, these statistics should be read in that context.

== Ward results ==
* - Retiring Councillor seeking re-election

=== Abercromby ===
No. 11 Abercromby
Party	Candidate	Votes	%	±%
	Arthur Hornby Lewis	unopposed		
Registered electors				
		Swing		

=== Castle Street ===
No. 6 Castle Street
Party	Candidate	Votes	%	±%
Conservative	David MacIver MP *	Unopposed	N/A	N/A
Registered electors				
Conservative hold				

=== Everton ===
No. 1 Everton
Party	Candidate	Votes	%	±%
Conservative	Robert Vining *	unopposed		
Registered electors				
Conservative hold		Swing		

=== Exchange ===
No. 5 Exchange
Party	Candidate	Votes	%	±%
Liberal	Stephen Barker Guion *	unopposed		
Registered electors				
Conservative hold		Swing		

=== Great George ===
No. 9 Great George
Party	Candidate	Votes	%	±%
Conservative	George Peet *	unopposed		
Registered electors				
Conservative hold		Swing		

=== Lime Street ===
No. 12 Lime Street
Party	Candidate	Votes	%	±%
Liberal	James Allanson Picton *	unopposed		
Registered electors				
Liberal hold		Swing		

=== North Toxteth ===
No. 16 North Toxteth
Party	Candidate	Votes	%	±%
Conservative	William Leyland	unopposed		
Registered electors				
Conservative hold		Swing		

=== Pitt Street ===
No. 8 Pitt Street
Party	Candidate	Votes	%	±%
Conservative	Col. Charles Edward Hamilton *	332	54%	
Liberal	Garrett Michael Byrne	287	46%	
Majority		45	8%	
Registered electors		764		
Turnout		619	81%	
Conservative hold		Swing		

=== Rodney Street ===
No. 10 Rodney Street
Party	Candidate	Votes	%	±%
Conservative	Philip Henry Rathbone *	unopposed		
Registered electors				
Liberal hold		Swing		

=== St. Anne Street ===
No. 13 St. Anne Street
Party	Candidate	Votes	%	±%
Conservative	George Fowler	955	55%	
Home Rule	Dr. Daniel Walter Parsons	792	45%	
Majority		163	10%	
Registered electors		2,305		
Turnout		1,747	76%	
Conservative hold		Swing		

=== St. Paul's ===
No. 4 St. Paul's
Party	Candidate	Votes	%	±%
Conservative	Thomas Huntington *	unopposed		
Registered electors				
Conservative hold		Swing		

=== St. Peter's ===
No. 7 St. Peter's
Party	Candidate	Votes	%	±%
Liberal	Alexander Balfour *	603	56%	
Conservative	Edward Lewis Wigan	468	44%	
Majority		135	12%	
Registered electors		1,467		
Turnout		1,071	73%	
Liberal hold		Swing		

=== Scotland ===
No. 2 Scotland
Party	Candidate	Votes	%	±%
Home Rule	Dr. Alexander Murray Bligh	2,228	52%	
Liberal	John McArdle *	2,016	48%	
Majority		212	4%	N/A
Registered electors		9,876		
Turnout		4,244	43%	
Home Rule gain from Liberal		Swing		

=== South Toxteth ===
No. 15 South Toxteth
Party	Candidate	Votes	%	±%
Conservative	William Radcliffe	unopposed		
Registered electors				
Conservative hold		Swing		

=== Vauxhall ===
No. 3 Vauxhall
Party	Candidate	Votes	%	±%
Home Rule	Dr. Andrew Commins	758	57%	
Liberal	Lt. Col. Peter Silvester Bidwell *	567	43%	
Majority		191	14%	N/A
Registered electors		2,337		
Turnout		1,325	57%	
Home Rule gain from Liberal		Swing		

=== West Derby ===
No. 14 West Derby
Party	Candidate	Votes	%	±%
Conservative	John Nichol	unopposed		
Registered electors				
Conservative hold		Swing		

== By-elections ==
=== No. 8, Pitt Street, 23 April 1877 ===
The death of Alderman William Barton was reported to the Council on 4 April 1877.

Councillor Henry Jennings (Conservative, Pitt Street, elected 1 November 1875) was elected by the Council as an Alderman on 9 April 1877.

No. 8 Pitt Street
Party	Candidate	Votes	%	±%
Conservative	Charles Courtenay Deane	311	50.1%	
Liberal	James Steel	310	49.9%	
Majority		1	0.2%	
Registered electors		764		
Turnout		621	81%	
Conservative hold		Swing		

This election was declared void on 27 June 1877 under the Corrupt Practices (Municipal Elections) Act 1872 and reported to the Council on 4 July 1877. The election was re-run on 23rd Mar 1878

== See also ==
- Liverpool City Council
- Liverpool Town Council elections 1835 - 1879
- Liverpool City Council elections 1880–present
- Mayors and Lord Mayors of Liverpool 1207 to present
- History of local government in England
