= 1874 Liverpool Town Council election =

English local election

← 1873	November 1, 1874	1875 →

16 seats were up for election: one seat for each of the 16 wards 33 (incl. Aldermen) seats needed for a majority

Elections to Liverpool Town Council were held on Monday 2 November 1874. One third of the council seats were up for election, the term of office of each councillor being three years.

All of the sixteen wards were uncontested.

After the election, the composition of the council was:

Party	Councillors	±	Aldermen	Total
Conservative	??	??	??	??
Liberal	??	??	??	??

== Election result ==
Liverpool local election result 1874
Party	Seats	Gains	Losses	Net gain/loss	Seats %	Votes %	Votes	+/−
Conservative	10							
Liberal	5							

== Ward results ==
* - Retiring Councillor seeking re-election

=== Abercromby ===
No. 11 Abercromby
Party	Candidate	Votes	%	±%
Conservative	Dr. George Gill *	unopposed		
Registered electors				
Conservative hold		Swing		

=== Castle Street ===
No. 6 Castle Street
Party	Candidate	Votes	%	±%
	Thomas Avison *	unopposed		
Registered electors				
		Swing		

=== Everton ===
No. 1 Everton
Party	Candidate	Votes	%	±%
Conservative	Edward Whitley *	unopposed		
Registered electors				
Conservative hold		Swing		

=== Exchange ===
No. 5 Exchange
Party	Candidate	Votes	%	±%
Conservative	Joseph Armstrong *	unopposed		
Registered electors				
Conservative hold		Swing		

=== Great George ===
No. 9 Great George
Party	Candidate	Votes	%	±%
Liberal	John Hays Wilson *	unopposed		
Registered electors				
Liberal hold		Swing		

=== Lime Street ===
No. 12 Lime Street
Party	Candidate	Votes	%	±%
Conservative	James Alexander Forrest	unopposed		
Registered electors				
Conservative hold		Swing		

=== North Toxteth ===
No. 16 North Toxteth
Party	Candidate	Votes	%	±%
Conservative	Arthur Bower Forwood *	unopposed		
Registered electors				
Conservative hold		Swing		

=== Pitt Street ===
No. 8 Pitt Street
Party	Candidate	Votes	%	±%
Conservative	William Bower Forwood *	unopposed		
Registered electors				
Conservative hold		Swing		

=== Rodney Street ===
No. 10 Rodney Street
Party	Candidate	Votes	%	±%
Liberal	David Campbell *	unopposed		
Registered electors				
Liberal hold		Swing		

=== St. Anne Street ===
No. 13 St. Anne Street
Party	Candidate	Votes	%	±%
Conservative	Dr. William Cross	unopposed		
Registered electors				
Conservative hold		Swing		

=== St. Paul's ===
No. 4 St. Paul's
Party	Candidate	Votes	%	±%
Conservative	Robert Wheeler Preston *	unopposed		
Registered electors				
Conservative hold		Swing		

=== St. Peter's ===
No. 7 St. Peter's
Party	Candidate	Votes	%	±%
Liberal	Henry Christie Beloe *	unopposed		
Registered electors				
Liberal hold		Swing		

=== Scotland ===
No. 2 Scotland
Party	Candidate	Votes	%	±%
Liberal	James Faihurst *	unopposed		
Registered electors				
Liberal hold		Swing		

=== South Toxteth ===
No. 15 South Toxteth
Party	Candidate	Votes	%	±%
Conservative	Thomas Bland Royden	unopposed		
Registered electors				
Conservative hold		Swing		

=== Vauxhall ===
No. 3 Vauxhall
Party	Candidate	Votes	%	±%
Liberal	John Yates *	unopposed		
Registered electors				
Liberal hold		Swing		

=== West Derby ===
No. 14 West Derby
Party	Candidate	Votes	%	±%
Liberal	Francis Anderson Clint *	unopposed		
Registered electors				
Liberal hold		Swing		

== Aldermanic Election ==
At the meeting of the Council on 9 November 1874, the terms of office of eight alderman expired.

The following eight were elected as Aldermen by the Council (Aldermen and Councillors) on 9 November 1874 for a term of six years.

* - re-elected aldermen.

Party	Alderman
Conservative	William Barton *
Conservative	Thomas Carey *
Conservative	William Chambres
Conservative	Joseph Hubback *
Conservative	James Jack *
Conservative	Joseph Gibbons Livingston *
Conservative	Thomas Rigby *
Conservative	Andrew Barclay Walker *

== By-elections ==
=== Aldermanic By Election, 19 March 1875 ===
The death of Alderman Thomas Cary (Conservative) was reported to the Council on 19 March 1875. William Bennett was elected as an alderman by the Council on 19 March 1875.

=== No. 13, St. Anne Street, 9 July 1875 ===
The death of Alderman James Tyrer (Conservative) was reported to the Council on 29 June 1875. Dr. John Stepford Taylor (Conservative, St. Anne Street, elected unopposed 1 November 1873) was elected as an alderman by the Council (Councillors and Aldermen) on 29 June 1875.

No. 1 Everton
Party	Candidate	Votes	%	±%
Conservative	George Fowler	617	64%	
	Henry Ashby	336	35%	
	Edmund Fowler	14	1.4%	
	Richard Fowler	2	0.21%	
Majority		281	29%	
Registered electors				
Turnout		969		
Conservative hold		Swing		

=== No. 10, Rodney Street, 24 September 1875 ===
Caused by the death of Councillor James Houghton (Conservative, Rodney Street, elected 1 November 1872).

No. 10 Rodney Street
Party	Candidate	Votes	%	±%
Conservative	Andrew Boyd	721	54%	
Liberal	William Oulton	616	46%	
Majority		105	8%	
Registered electors				
Turnout		1,337		
Conservative hold		Swing		

=== No. 11, Abercromby, 14 October 1875 ===
The Death of Councillor Robertson Gladstone (Liberal, Abercromby, elected 1 November 1873) was reported to the Council on 6 October 1875.

No. 11 Abercromby
Party	Candidate	Votes	%	±%
	Arthur Hornby Lewis	790	51%	
	Thomas Brocklebank jnr.	753	49%	
Majority		37		
Registered electors				
Turnout		1,543		
		Swing		

=== No. 14, West Derby, 21 October 1875 ===
The Death of Councillor Francis Anderson Clint (Liberal, West Derby, elected 2 November 1874) was reported to the Council on 6 October 1875.

No. 14 West Derby
Party	Candidate	Votes	%	±%
Conservative	William Samuel Graves	unopposed		
Registered electors				
Conservative gain from Liberal		Swing		

== See also ==
- Liverpool City Council
- Liverpool Town Council elections 1835 - 1879
- Liverpool City Council elections 1880–present
- Mayors and Lord Mayors of Liverpool 1207 to present
- History of local government in England
