= 1857 Liverpool Town Council election =

English local election

← 1856	November 2, 1857	1858 →

16 seats were up for election: one seat for each of the 16 wards 33 (incl. Aldermen) seats needed for a majority

Elections to Liverpool Town Council were held on Monday 2 November 1857. One third of the council seats were up for election, the term of office of each councillor being three years.

Nine of the sixteen wards were uncontested.

After the election, the composition of the council was:

Party	Councillors	±	Aldermen	Total
Conservative	??	??	??	??
Whig	??	??	??	??

== Election result ==
Liverpool local election result 1857
Party	Seats	Gains	Losses	Net gain/loss	Seats %	Votes %	Votes	+/−
Conservative								
Whig								

Because of the large number of uncontested seats, these statistics should be taken in that context.

== Ward results ==
* - Retiring Councillor seeking re-election

=== Abercromby ===
No. 11 Abercromby
Party	Candidate	Votes	%	±%
Conservative	Robert Hutchinson	361	52%	
Whig	Dr. Joseph Anderson	335	48%	
Majority		26	4%	N/A
Registered electors				
Turnout		696		
Whig gain from Conservative		Swing		

=== Castle Street ===
No. 6 Castle Street
Party	Candidate	Votes	%	±%
Conservative	James Ryley	unopposed		
Registered electors				
Conservative hold		Swing		

=== Everton ===
No. 1 Everton
Party	Candidate	Votes	%	±%
Conservative	Daniel Crosthwaite *	564	57%	
Whig	George Melly	417	43%	
Majority		147	14%	
Registered electors				
Turnout		981		
Conservative hold		Swing		

=== Exchange ===
No. 5 Exchange
Party	Candidate	Votes	%	±%
	Thomas Littledale *	unopposed		
Registered electors				
		Swing		

=== Great George ===
No. 9 Great George
Party	Candidate	Votes	%	±%
	Thomas Wagstaff *	unopposed		
Registered electors				
		Swing		

=== Lime Street ===
No. 12 Lime Street
Party	Candidate	Votes	%	±%
	James Johnson *	unopposed		
Registered electors				
		Swing		

=== North Toxteth ===
No. 16 North Toxteth
Party	Candidate	Votes	%	±%
Conservative	Thomas Vernon	405	64%	
Whig	Thomas Avison	231	36%	
Majority		174	28%	
Registered electors				
Turnout		636		
Conservative hold		Swing		

=== Pitt Street ===
No. 8 Pitt Street
Party	Candidate	Votes	%	±%
	Samuel Robert Graves	unopposed		
Registered electors				
		Swing		

=== Rodney Street ===
No. 10 Rodney Street
Party	Candidate	Votes	%	±%
Whig	Charles Mozley *	Unopposed	N/A	N/A
Registered electors				
Whig hold				

=== St. Anne Street ===
No. 13 St. Anne Street
Party	Candidate	Votes	%	±%
Whig	Joseph Kitchen *	209	54%	
Conservative	James Clegg	177	46%	
Majority		32	8%	
Registered electors				
Turnout		386		
Whig hold		Swing		

=== St. Paul's ===
No. 4 St. Paul's
Party	Candidate	Votes	%	±%
Conservative	William Barton	201	51%	
Whig	John Rowland McGuffie *	195	49%	
Majority		6	2%	N/A
Registered electors				
Turnout		396		
Conservative gain from Whig		Swing		

=== St. Peter's ===
No. 7 St. Peter's
Party	Candidate	Votes	%	±%
Whig	Charles Tricks Bowring	322	52%	
Conservative	Harmood Banner *	301	48%	
Majority		21	4%	N/A
Registered electors				
Turnout		623		
Whig gain from Conservative		Swing		

=== Scotland ===
No. 2 Scotland
Party	Candidate	Votes	%	±%
	James Crellin	362	50.3%	
	William Liversidge	357	49.7%	
Majority		5		
Registered electors				
Turnout		719		
	gain from	Swing		

=== South Toxteth ===
No. 15 South Toxteth
Party	Candidate	Votes	%	±%
Conservative	John Stewart *	164	92%	
Whig	Mr. Alpass	14	8%	
Majority		150	84%	
Registered electors				
Turnout		178		
Conservative hold		Swing		

=== Vauxhall ===
No. 3 Vauxhall
Party	Candidate	Votes	%	±%
Whig	Christopher James Corbally	121	64%	
Conservative	Mr. Savage	69	36%	
Majority		52	28%	
Registered electors				
Turnout		190		
Whig hold		Swing		

=== West Derby ===
No. 14 West Derby
Party	Candidate	Votes	%	±%
Conservative	Richard Mitchell Beckwith *	unopposed		
Registered electors				
Conservative hold		Swing		

== See also ==
Liverpool City Council

Liverpool Town Council elections 1835 - 1879

Liverpool City Council elections 1880–present

Mayors and Lord Mayors of Liverpool 1207 to present

History of local government in England
