= 1851 Liverpool Town Council election =

English local election

← 1850	November 1, 1851	1852 →

16 seats were up for election: one seat for each of the 16 wards 33 (incl. Aldermen) seats needed for a majority

Elections to Liverpool Town Council were held on Saturday 1 November 1851. One-third of the council seats were up for election, the term of office of each councillor being three years.

Nine of the sixteen wards were uncontested.

After the election, the composition of the council was:

Party	Councillors	±	Aldermen	Total
Conservative	??	??	??	??
Reformers	??	??	??	??

== Election result ==
Liverpool local election result 1851
Party	Seats	Gains	Losses	Net gain/loss	Seats %	Votes %	Votes	+/−
Conservative								
Whig								

== Ward results ==
* - Retiring Councillor seeking re-election

=== Abercromby ===
No. 11 Abercromby
Party	Candidate	Votes	%	±%
Conservative	Hugh Neill *	Unopposed	N/A	N/A
Registered electors				
Conservative hold				

=== Castle Street ===
No. 6 Castle Street
Party	Candidate	Votes	%	±%
Whig	Hugh Hornby *	Unopposed	N/A	N/A
Registered electors				
Whig hold				

=== Everton ===
No. 1 Everton
Party	Candidate	Votes	%	±%
Conservative	Robert Aked *	171	72%	
Whig	John Johnson	65	28%	
Majority		106	44%	
Registered electors				
Turnout		236		
Conservative hold		Swing		

=== Exchange ===
No. 5 Exchange
Party	Candidate	Votes	%	±%
Conservative	Thomas Littledale *	Unopposed	N/A	N/A
Registered electors				
Conservative hold				

=== Great George ===
No. 9 Great George
Party	Candidate	Votes	%	±%
Conservative	Thomas Wagstaff *	Unopposed	N/A	N/A
Registered electors				
Conservative hold				

=== Lime Street ===
No. 12 Lime Street
Party	Candidate	Votes	%	±%
Whig	James Johnson *	Unopposed	N/A	N/A
Registered electors				
Whig hold				

=== North Toxteth ===
No. 16 North Toxteth
Party	Candidate	Votes	%	±%
Conservative	Thomas Royden	253	61%	
Whig	William Fisher	161	39%	
Majority		92	22%	
Registered electors				
Turnout		414		
Conservative hold		Swing		

=== Pitt Street ===
No. 8 Pitt Street
Party	Candidate	Votes	%	±%
Conservative	John Gladstone jun.	Unopposed	N/A	N/A
Registered electors				
gain from		Swing		

=== Rodney Street ===
No. 10 Rodney Street
Party	Candidate	Votes	%	±%
Conservative	Thomas Flemming	Unopposed	N/A	N/A
Registered electors				
Conservative hold				

=== St. Anne Street ===
No. 13 St. Anne Street
Party	Candidate	Votes	%	±%
Conservative	Raymond William Houghton	207	59%	
Whig	William Purser Freme *	141	41%	
Majority		66	18%	N/A
Registered electors				
Turnout		348		
Conservative gain from Whig		Swing		

=== St. Paul's ===
No. 4 St. Paul's
Party	Candidate	Votes	%	±%
Whig	John Rowland McGuffie	Unopposed	N/A	N/A
Registered electors				
Whig gain from Conservative				

=== St. Peter's ===
No. 7 St. Peter's
Party	Candidate	Votes	%	±%
Conservative	Harmood Banner	285	61%	
Whig	Thomas Clarke *	182	39%	
Majority		103	22%	N/A
Registered electors				
Turnout		467		
Conservative gain from Whig		Swing		

=== Scotland ===
No. 2 Scotland
Party	Candidate	Votes	%	±%
Whig	James Thomson *	Unopposed	N/A	N/A
Registered electors				
Whig hold				

=== South Toxteth ===
No. 15 South Toxteth
Party	Candidate	Votes	%	±%
Conservative	John Stewart	272	80%	
Whig	Edward Cannon Hindley *	66	20%	
Majority		206	60%	N/A
Registered electors				
Turnout		338		
Conservative gain from Whig		Swing		

=== Vauxhall ===
No. 3 Vauxhall
Party	Candidate	Votes	%	±%
Whig	Edward Bradley	147	65%	
Conservative	Thomas Llewelyn Hodson *	78	35%	
Majority		69	30%	N/A
Registered electors				
Turnout		225		
Whig gain from Conservative		Swing		

=== West Derby ===
No. 14 West Derby
Party	Candidate	Votes	%	±%
Conservative	Richard Mitchell Beckwith *	233	62%	
Whig	William Earle	140	38%	
Majority		93	24%	N/A
Registered electors				
Turnout		373		
Conservative gain from Whig		Swing		

== See also ==
- Liverpool Town Council elections 1835 - 1879
- Liverpool City Council elections 1880–present
- Mayors and Lord Mayors of Liverpool 1207 to present
- History of local government in England
