= 1882 Liverpool City Council election =

1882 English local government election

- November 1, 1882

16 seats were up for election (one third): one seat for each of the 16 wards 33 seats needed for a majority

Elections to Liverpool City Council were held on Wednesday 1 November 1882. One third of the council seats were up for election, the term of office of each councillor being three years.

Ten of the sixteen seats were uncontested.

After the election, the composition of the council was:

Party	Councillors	±	Aldermen	Total
Conservative	??	??	??	??
Liberal	??	??	??	??
Irish Home Rule	5	0	0	5

== Election result ==
Liverpool local election result 1882
Party	Seats	Gains	Losses	Net gain/loss	Seats %	Votes %	Votes	+/−
Conservative	6	0	0	0	37.5%	43%	4,926	
Liberal	8	0	0	0	50%	48%	5,540	
Home Rule	2	0	0	0	12.5%			
Ratepayers' Association	0	0	0	0	0%	5.8%	663	
Labour	0	0	0	0	0%	2.7%	304	
Labour League	0	0	0	0	0%	0.24%	28	

== Ward results ==
* - Retiring Councillor seeking re-election

=== Abercromby ===
No. 11 Abercromby
Party	Candidate	Votes	%	±%
Conservative	Dr. Nicholas Kenrick Marsh *	unopposed		
Registered electors				
Conservative hold		Swing		

=== Castle Street ===
No. 6 Castle Street
Party	Candidate	Votes	%	±%
Liberal	Samuel Smith *	788	52%	
Conservative	Edmund Taylor	730	48%	
Majority		58	4%	
Registered electors				
Turnout		1,518		
Liberal hold		Swing		

=== Everton ===
No. 1 Everton
Party	Candidate	Votes	%	±%
Conservative	Robert Galloway	unopposed		
Registered electors				
Conservative hold		Swing		

=== Exchange ===
No. 5 Exchange
Party	Candidate	Votes	%	±%
Liberal	Stephen Barker Guion *	842	73%	
Labour	Patrick Murphy	304	27%	
Majority		538	46%	
Registered electors				
Turnout		1,146		
Liberal hold		Swing		

=== Great George ===
No. 9 Great George
Party	Candidate	Votes	%	±%
Liberal	Benjamin Lewis *	563	61%	
Conservative	Thomas McCracken	356	39%	
Majority		207	22%	
Registered electors				
Turnout		919		
Liberal hold		Swing		

=== Lime Street ===
No. 12 Lime Street
Party	Candidate	Votes	%	±%
Liberal	Sir James Allanson Picton *	690	78%	
Ratepayers' Association	Archibald Beatty	195	22%	
Majority		495	56%	
Registered electors				
Turnout		885		
Liberal hold		Swing		

=== North Toxteth ===
No. 16 North Toxteth
Party	Candidate	Votes	%	±%
Conservative	Thomas Hughes *	unopposed		
Registered electors				
Conservative hold		Swing		

=== Pitt Street ===
No. 8 Pitt Street
Party	Candidate	Votes	%	±%
Liberal	Jeremiah Miles *	unopposed		
Registered electors				
Liberal hold		Swing		

=== Rodney Street ===
No. 10 Rodney Street
Party	Candidate	Votes	%	±%
Liberal	Philip Henry Rathbone *	unopposed		
Registered electors				
Liberal hold		Swing		

=== St. Anne Street ===
No. 13 St. Anne Street
Party	Candidate	Votes	%	±%
Conservative	Joseph Woodcock	815	48%	
Ratepayers' Association	Patrick Byrne	468	27%	
Liberal	Henry Vaughan	391	23%	
Labour League	John O'Brien	28	1.6%	
Majority		424	21%	
Registered electors				
Turnout		1,702		
Conservative hold		Swing		

=== St. Paul's ===
No. 4 St. Paul's
Party	Candidate	Votes	%	±%
Liberal	John Davies *	unopposed		
Registered electors				
Liberal hold		Swing		

=== St. Peter's ===
No. 7 St. Peter's
Party	Candidate	Votes	%	±%
Liberal	John Stevenson	unopposed		
Registered electors				
Liberal hold		Swing		

=== Scotland ===
No. 2 Scotland
Party	Candidate	Votes	%	±%
Home Rule	Dr. Alexander Murray Bligh *	unopposed		
Registered electors				
Home Rule hold		Swing		

=== South Toxteth ===
No. 15 South Toxteth
Party	Candidate	Votes	%	±%
Conservative	William Radcliffe *	unopposed		
Registered electors				
Conservative hold		Swing		

=== Vauxhall ===
No. 3 Vauxhall
Party	Candidate	Votes	%	±%
Home Rule	Andrew Commins MP *	unopposed		
Registered electors				
Home Rule hold		Swing		

=== West Derby ===
No. 14 West Derby
Party	Candidate	Votes	%	±%
Conservative	Samuel Leigh Gregson	3,025	57%	
Liberal	William Simpson	2,266	43%	
Majority		759	14%	
Registered electors				
Turnout		5,291		
Conservative hold		Swing		

== By-elections ==
=== No.2, Scotland, 7 August 1883 ===
Caused by the death of Councillor Patrick de Lacy Garton (Irish Home Rule, Scotland, elected 1 November 1880 – 1881)

No. 2 Scotland
Party	Candidate	Votes	%	±%
Home Rule	Patrick Byrne	1,690	58%	
	Joseph Thomas	1,153	39%	
	John O'Brien	78	2.7%	
Majority		537		
Registered electors				
Turnout		2,921		
Home Rule hold		Swing		

=== Aldermanic By Election, 18 September 1883 ===
Alderman John Weightman died on 5 August 1883. Former Councillor Robert Vining (Conservative, Everton, elected 1 November 1876) was elected as an alderman by the Council (Councillors and Aldermen) on 18 September 1883.

== See also ==
- Liverpool City Council
- Liverpool Town Council elections 1835 - 1879
- Liverpool City Council elections 1880–present
- Mayors and Lord Mayors of Liverpool 1207 to present
- History of local government in England
