= 1881 Liverpool City Council election =

Liverpool Town Council elections 1881

- November 1, 1881

16 seats were up for election (one third): one seat for each of the 16 wards 33 (including Aldermen) seats needed for a majority seats needed for a majority

Elections to Liverpool City Council were held on Tuesday 1 November 1881. One third of the council seats were up for election, the term of office of each councillor being three years.

Ten of the sixteen wards were uncontested.

After the election, the composition of the council was:

Party	Councillors	±	Aldermen	Total
Conservative	??	??	??	??
Liberal	??	??	??	??
Irish Home Rule	5	0	0	5

== Election result ==
Liverpool local election result 1881
Party	Seats	Gains	Losses	Net gain/loss	Seats %	Votes %	Votes	+/−
Conservative	11	2	0	+2	69%	55%	4,169	
Liberal	3	0	2	-2	19%	45%	3,439	
Home Rule	2				12.5%			

== Ward results ==
* - Retiring Councillor seeking re-election

=== Abercromby ===
No. 11 Abercromby
Party	Candidate	Votes	%	±%
Conservative	Anthony Bower *	954	58%	
Liberal	Astrup Cariss	697	42%	
Majority		257	16%	
Registered electors		2,426		
Turnout		1,551	68%	
Conservative hold		Swing		

=== Castle Street ===
No. 6 Castle Street
Party	Candidate	Votes	%	±%
Conservative	Joseph Bond Morgan	752	52%	
Liberal	William Crosfield *	702	48%	
Majority		50	4%	N/A
Registered electors		1,911		
Turnout		1,454	76%	
Conservative gain from Liberal		Swing		

=== Everton ===
No. 1 Everton
Party	Candidate	Votes	%	±%
Conservative	James Barkeley Smith *	unopposed		
Registered electors				
Conservative hold		Swing		

=== Exchange ===
No. 5 Exchange
Party	Candidate	Votes	%	±%
Liberal	Thomas Holder *	unopposed		
Registered electors				
Liberal hold		Swing		

=== Great George ===
No. 9 Great George
Party	Candidate	Votes	%	±%
Conservative	George Peet	455	54%	
Liberal	Samuel Bennett Jackson	387	46%	
Majority		68	8%	
Registered electors		1,168		
Turnout		842	72%	
Conservative hold		Swing		

=== Lime Street ===
No. 12 Lime Street
Party	Candidate	Votes	%	±%
Conservative	Edward Grindley *	unopposed		
Registered electors				
Conservative hold		Swing		

=== North Toxteth ===
No. 16 North Toxteth
Party	Candidate	Votes	%	±%
Conservative	Dr. Robert Hamilton	unopposed		
Registered electors				
Conservative hold		Swing		

=== Pitt Street ===
No. 8 Pitt Street
Party	Candidate	Votes	%	±%
Liberal	Francis Joseph McAdam	326	58%	
Conservative	Horatio Syred	235	42%	
Majority		91	16%	
Registered electors		811		
Turnout		561	69%	
Liberal hold		Swing		

=== Rodney Street ===
No. 10 Rodney Street
Party	Candidate	Votes	%	±%
Conservative	William John Stewart	796	57%	
Liberal	William Oulton	611	43%	
Majority		185	14%	N/A
Registered electors		2,332		
Turnout		1,407	60%	
Conservative gain from Liberal		Swing		

=== St. Anne Street ===
No. 13 St. Anne Street
Party	Candidate	Votes	%	±%
Conservative	Thomas Hayes Sheen *	977	58%	
Liberal	Ronald McDougall	716	42%	
Majority		261	16%	
Registered electors		2,417		
Turnout		1,693	70%	
Conservative hold		Swing		

=== St. Paul's ===
No. 4 St. Paul's
Party	Candidate	Votes	%	±%
Conservative	Owen Hugh Williams *	unopposed		
Registered electors				
Conservative hold		Swing		

=== St. Peter's ===
No. 7 St. Peter's
Party	Candidate	Votes	%	±%
Liberal	Charles Tricks Bowring *	unopposed		
Registered electors				
Liberal hold		Swing		

=== Scotland ===
No. 2 Scotland
Party	Candidate	Votes	%	±%
Home Rule	Laurence Connolly *	unopposed		
Registered electors				
Home Rule hold		Swing		

=== South Toxteth ===
No. 15 South Toxteth
Party	Candidate	Votes	%	±%
Conservative	Joseph Ball *	unopposed		
Registered electors				
Conservative hold		Swing		

=== Vauxhall ===
No. 3 Vauxhall
Party	Candidate	Votes	%	±%
Home Rule	Charles McArdle *	unopposed		
Registered electors				
Home Rule hold		Swing		

=== West Derby ===
No. 14 West Derby
Party	Candidate	Votes	%	±%
Conservative	William John Lunt *	unopposed		
Registered electors				
Conservative hold		Swing		

== By-elections ==
=== No. 12, Lime Street, 25 November 1881 ===
Caused by the death of Councillor John Henstock (Party? Lime Street, elected 4 April 1881) which was reported to the Council on 9 November 1881.

No. 12 Lime Street
Party	Candidate	Votes	%	±%
Conservative	Thomas Patrick Holden	609	55%	
	Thomas Davy Laurence	491	45%	
Majority		118		
Registered electors				
Turnout		1,100		
Conservative gain from		Swing		

=== No. 7, St. Peter's, 25 November 1881 ===
Caused by the resignation of Councillor Alexander Balfour (Liberal, St. Peter's, elected 1 November 1879).

No. 7 St. Peter's
Party	Candidate	Votes	%	±%
Liberal	John Stevenson	577	50%	
	Robert Wilson	533	46%	
	Patrick Byrne	50	4%	
Majority		44		
Registered electors				
Turnout		1,160		
Liberal hold		Swing		

== See also ==
- Liverpool City Council
- Liverpool Town Council elections 1835 - 1879
- Liverpool City Council elections 1880–present
- Mayors and Lord Mayors of Liverpool 1207 to present
- History of local government in England
