= 1863 Liverpool Town Council election =

1863 UK local government election

- November 1, 1863

16 seats were up for election: one seat for each of the 16 wards 33 (incl. Aldermen) seats needed for a majority

Elections to Liverpool Town Council were held on Monday 2 November 1863. One third of the council seats were up for election, the term of office of each councillor being three years.

Seven of the sixteen wards were uncontested.

After the election, the composition of the council was:

Party	Councillors	±	Aldermen	Total
Conservative	??	??	16	??
Liberal	??	??	0	??

== Election result ==
Liverpool local election result 1863
Party	Seats	Gains	Losses	Net gain/loss	Seats %	Votes %	Votes	+/−
Conservative	6	0	8	-8	37%	49%	2,403	
Liberal	10	8	0	+8	63%	51%	2,493	

Because seven of the sixteen seats were uncontested seats, these statistics should be taken in that context.

== Ward results ==
* - Retiring Councillor seeking re-election

=== Abercromby ===
No. 11 Abercromby
Party	Candidate	Votes	%	±%
Conservative	Robert Hutchison *	unopposed		
Registered electors				
Conservative hold		Swing		

=== Castle Street ===
No. 6 Castle Street
Party	Candidate	Votes	%	±%
Liberal	Samuel Greg Rathbone	unopposed		
Registered electors				
Liberal gain from Conservative		Swing		

=== Everton ===
No. 1 Everton
Party	Candidate	Votes	%	±%
Liberal	James Reddecliff Jeffery	205		
Conservative	Daniel Crosthwaite *	0		
Majority				
Registered electors				
Turnout				
Liberal gain from Conservative		Swing		

=== Exchange ===
No. 5 Exchange
Party	Candidate	Votes	%	±%
Liberal	William Barry	unopposed		
Registered electors				
Liberal gain from Conservative		Swing		

=== Great George ===
No. 9 Great George
Party	Candidate	Votes	%	±%
Conservative	Thomas Wagstaff *	240	56%	
Liberal	Joseph Robinson	190	44%	
Majority		50	12%	
Registered electors				
Turnout		430		
Conservative hold		Swing		

=== Lime Street ===
No. 12 Lime Street
Party	Candidate	Votes	%	±%
Liberal	Henry Tate	Unopposed	N/A	N/A
Registered electors				
Liberal gain from Conservative				

=== North Toxteth ===
No. 16 North Toxteth
Party	Candidate	Votes	%	±%
Conservative	Edward Lawrence	447	58%	
Liberal	Henry Pooley	330	42%	
Majority		117	16%	
Registered electors				
Turnout		777		
Conservative hold		Swing		

=== Pitt Street ===
No. 8 Pitt Street
Party	Candidate	Votes	%	±%
Conservative	Samuel Robert Graves *	20	100%	
Liberal	James Levington	0	0%	
Majority		20	100%	
Registered electors				
Turnout		20		
Conservative hold		Swing		

=== Rodney Street ===
No. 10 Rodney Street
Party	Candidate	Votes	%	±%
Liberal	Charles Mozley *	unopposed		
Registered electors				
Liberal hold		Swing		

=== St. Anne Street ===
No. 13 St. Anne Street
Party	Candidate	Votes	%	±%
Liberal	Joseph Kitchen	233	55%	
Conservative	Samuel Goodacre	190	45%	
Majority		43	10%	N/A
Registered electors				
Turnout		423		
Liberal gain from Conservative		Swing		

=== St. Paul's ===
No. 4 St. Paul's
Party	Candidate	Votes	%	±%
Conservative	William Barton *	unopposed		
Registered electors				
Conservative hold		Swing		

=== St. Peter's ===
No. 7 St. Peter's
Party	Candidate	Votes	%	±%
Liberal	Charles Tricks Bowring *	unopposed		
Registered electors				
Liberal hold		Swing		

=== Scotland ===
No. 2 Scotland
Party	Candidate	Votes	%	±%
Liberal	William Williams	497	55%	
Conservative	James Crellin *	405	45%	
Majority		92	10%	N/A
Registered electors				
Turnout		902		
Liberal gain from Conservative		Swing		

=== South Toxteth ===
No. 15 South Toxteth
Party	Candidate	Votes	%	±%
Liberal	William Cowley Miller	488	60%	
Conservative	Joseph Steel *	324	40%	
Majority		164	20%	N/A
Registered electors				
Turnout		812		
Liberal gain from Conservative		Swing		

=== Vauxhall ===
No. 3 Vauxhall
Party	Candidate	Votes	%	±%
Liberal	James Whilty	139	54%	
Conservative	Thomas Rigby	120	46%	
Majority		246	8%	N/A
Registered electors				
Turnout		1,068		
Liberal gain from Conservative		Swing		

=== West Derby ===
No. 14 West Derby
Party	Candidate	Votes	%	±%
Conservative	John Birch Melladew	657	62%	
Liberal	Arnold Baruchson	411	38%	
Majority		246	24%	
Registered electors				
Turnout		1,068		
Conservative hold		Swing		

== By-elections ==
=== No. 2, Scotland, ===
Following the resignation of Alderman Sanuel Holme, Councillor Richard Sheil (Merchant, of Bankfield Road, West Derby, elected to Scotland ward on 1 November 1861) was elected as an alderman on Wednesday 11 May 1864.

No. 2 Scotland
Party	Candidate	Votes	%	±%
Majority				
Registered electors				
Turnout				
	gain from	Swing		

== See also ==
- Liverpool City Council
- Liverpool Town Council elections 1835 - 1879
- Liverpool City Council elections 1880–present
- Mayors and Lord Mayors of Liverpool 1207 to present
- History of local government in England
