= 1861 Liverpool Town Council election =

1861 UK local government election

- November 1, 1861

16 seats were up for election: one seat for each of the 16 wards 33 (incl. Aldermen) seats needed for a majority

Elections to Liverpool Town Council were held on Friday 1 November 1861. One third of the council seats were up for election, the term of office of each councillor being three years, and nine of the 16 wards were uncontested. After the election, the composition of the council was:

Party	Councillors	±	Aldermen	Total
Conservative	??	??	??	??
Liberal	??	??	??	??

== Election result ==
Liverpool local election result 1861
Party	Seats	Gains	Losses	Net gain/loss	Seats %	Votes %	Votes	+/−
Conservative	4							
Liberal	12							

Because of the large number of uncontested seats, these statistics should be taken in that context.

== Ward results ==
* - Retiring Councillor seeking re-election

=== Abercromby ===
No. 11 Abercromby
Party	Candidate	Votes	%	±%
Liberal	Robertson Gladstone *	Unopposed	N/A	N/A
Registered electors				
Liberal hold				

=== Castle Street ===
No. 6 Castle Street
Party	Candidate	Votes	%	±%
Liberal	Thomas Avison *	unopposed		
Registered electors				
Liberal hold		Swing		

=== Everton ===
No. 1 Everton
Party	Candidate	Votes	%	±%
Conservative	Thomas Darnley Anderson *	unopposed		
Registered electors				
Conservative hold		Swing		

=== Exchange ===
No. 5 Exchange
Party	Candidate	Votes	%	±%
Conservative	James Tyrer *	343	54%	
Liberal	John Ravenscroft	292	46%	
Majority		51	8%	
Registered electors				
Turnout		635		
Conservative hold		Swing		

Until the Ballot Act 1872 polling at elections was in public and the state of the polls were reported on an hour by hour basis in the newspapers.

Time	James Tyrer		John Ravenscroft	
Time	Votes	%	Votes	%
10:00	91	48%	98	52%
11:00	163	49%	168	51%
12:00	253	54%	218	46%
13:00	289	53%	253	47%
14:00	303	53%	270	47%
15:00	324	53%	287	47%
16:00	343	54%	292	46%

=== Great George ===
No. 9 Great George
Party	Candidate	Votes	%	±%
	John Rogers *	unopposed		
Registered electors				
		Swing		

=== Lime Street ===
No. 12 Lime Street
Party	Candidate	Votes	%	±%
Liberal	James Allanson Picton *	Unopposed	N/A	N/A
Registered electors				
Liberal hold				

=== North Toxteth ===
No. 16 North Toxteth
Party	Candidate	Votes	%	±%
Conservative	Joseph Harrison	395	68%	
Liberal	William Digby Smith	188	32%	
Majority		207	36%	
Registered electors				
Turnout		583		
Conservative gain from Liberal		Swing		

Time	Joseph Harrison		William Digby Smith	
Time	Votes	%	Votes	%
10:00	98	68%	46	32%
11:00	152	66%	79	34%
12:00	202	63%	118	37%
13:00	273	66%	141	34%
14:00	336	67%	167	33%
15:00	370	67%	180	33%
16:00	396	67%	195	33%

The discrepancy between the final results given in the Council Minute Book and the 4 o'clock final figures as reported in the Liverpool Mercury should perhaps be attributed to errors in the newspaper report.

=== Pitt Street ===
No. 8 Pitt Street
Party	Candidate	Votes	%	±%
	Thomas Ridley *	unopposed		
Registered electors				
		Swing		

=== Rodney Street ===
No. 10 Rodney Street
Party	Candidate	Votes	%	±%
Liberal	Thomas Bulley Job *	unopposed		
Registered electors				
Liberal hold		Swing		

=== St. Anne Street ===
No. 13 St. Anne Street
Party	Candidate	Votes	%	±%
Liberal	William Bottomley Bairstow	226	53%	
Conservative	Arthur Piggot Fletcher	200	47%	
Majority		26	6%	
Registered electors				
Turnout		426		
Liberal hold		Swing		

Time	William Bottomley Bairstow		Arthur Piggot Fletcher	
Time	Votes	%	Votes	%
11:00	178	52%	167	48%
12:00	186	52%	170	48%
13:00	187	52%	176	48%
14:00	193	52%	177	48%
15:00	208	53%	183	47%
16:00	226	53%	200	47%

=== St. Paul's ===
No. 4 St. Paul's
Party	Candidate	Votes	%	±%
Liberal	John Buck Spence	192	54%	
Conservative	Thomas Rigby	162	46%	
Majority		30	8%	
Registered electors				
Turnout		354		
Liberal hold		Swing		

Time	John Buck Spence		Thomas Rigby	
Time	Votes	%	Votes	%
10:00	55	49%	57	51%
11:00	109	60%	73	40%
12:00	137	59%	94	41%
13:00	155	59%	106	41%
14:00	170	59%	118	41%
15:00	180	58%	132	42%
16:00	187	57%	141	43%

=== St. Peter's ===
No. 7 St. Peter's
Party	Candidate	Votes	%	±%
Liberal	David Rae *	unopposed		
Registered electors				
Liberal hold		Swing		

=== Scotland ===
No. 2 Scotland
Party	Candidate	Votes	%	±%
	Richard Sheil *	unopposed		
Registered electors				
		Swing		

=== South Toxteth ===
No. 15 South Toxteth
Party	Candidate	Votes	%	±%
Liberal	Horace Seymour Alpass	298	54%	
Conservative	John Farnworth	249	46%	
Majority		49	8%	
Registered electors				
Turnout		547		
Liberal hold		Swing		

Time	Horace Seymour Alpass		John Farnworth	
Time	Votes	%	Votes	%
10:00	100	59%	69	41%
11:00	111	58%	79	42%
12:00	164	61%	105	39%
13:00	205	56%	160	44%
14:00	233	56%	185	44%
15:00	259	51%	247	49%
16:00	298	54%	249	46%

=== Vauxhall ===
No. 3 Vauxhall
Party	Candidate	Votes	%	±%
Liberal	Roger Haydock *	118	75%	
Conservative	James Denton	39	25%	
Majority		79	50%	
Registered electors				
Turnout		157		
Liberal hold		Swing		

Time	Roger Haydock		James Denton	
Time	Votes	%	Votes	%
10:00	29	74%	10	26%
11:00	51	78%	14	22%
12:00	76	79%	20	21%
13:00	85	73%	32	27%
14:00	112	75%	38	25%
16:00	118	75%	39	25%

=== West Derby ===
No. 14 West Derby
Party	Candidate	Votes	%	±%
Liberal	Peter George Heyworth	507	52%	
Conservative	Edward Samuelson	471	48%	
Majority		36	4%	
Registered electors				
Turnout		978		
Liberal hold		Swing		

Time	Peter George Heyworth		Edward Samuelson	
Time	Votes	%	Votes	%
9:30	27	69%	12	31%
10:00	66	53%	58	47%
11:00	147	53%	129	47%
12:00	195	43%	260	57%
13:00	275	50%	277	50%
13:35	334	51%	318	49%
14:30	394	51%	377	49%
15:00	451	52%	419	48%
16:00	507	52%	471	48%

== See also ==
- Liverpool Town Council elections 1835 - 1879
- Liverpool City Council elections 1880–present
- Mayors and Lord Mayors of Liverpool 1207 to present
- History of local government in England
