= 1864 Liverpool Town Council election =

1864 UK local government election

- 1 November 1864

16 seats were up for election: one seat for each of the 16 wards 33 (incl. Aldermen) seats needed for a majority

Elections to Liverpool Town Council were held on Wednesday 1 November 1864. One third of the council seats were up for election, the term of office of each councillor being three years.

Five of the sixteen wards were uncontested.

After the election, the composition of the council was:

Party	Councillors	±	Aldermen	Total
Conservative	??	??	16	??
Liberal	??	??	0	??

== Election result ==
Liverpool local election result 1864
Party	Seats	Gains	Losses	Net gain/loss	Seats %	Votes %	Votes	+/−
Conservative								
Liberal								

Because of the large number of uncontested seats, these statistics should be taken in that context.

== Ward results ==
* - Retiring Councillor seeking re-election

=== Abercromby ===
No. 11 Abercromby
Party	Candidate	Votes	%	±%
Liberal	Robertson Gladstone *	unopposed		
Registered electors				
Turnout				
Liberal hold		Swing		

=== Castle Street ===
No. 6 Castle Street
Party	Candidate	Votes	%	±%
Conservative	John Chesshyre Blythe	418	51%	
Liberal	Thomas Avison *	409	49%	
Majority		9	2%	N/A
Registered electors				
Turnout		827		
Conservative gain from Liberal		Swing		

Time	John Chesshyre Blythe		Thomas Avison	
Time	Votes	%	Votes	%
11:00	183	50%	180	50%
11:30	220	50%	223	50%
12:00	254	50%	249	50%
12:30	273	50%	274	50%
13:00	294	51%	288	49%
13:30	309	50%	313	50%
14:00	325	50%	328	50%
15:00	353	49%	363	51%
15:30	382	50%	384	50%
16:00	418	51%	409	49%

=== Everton ===
No. 1 Everton
Party	Candidate	Votes	%	±%
	Archibald Charles Stewart	unopposed		
Registered electors				
	gain from	Swing		

=== Exchange ===
No. 5 Exchange
Party	Candidate	Votes	%	±%
Conservative	James Tyrer *	348	51%	
Liberal	Charles Pierre Melly	330	49%	
Majority		18	2%	
Registered electors				
Turnout		678		
Conservative hold		Swing		

Time	James Tyrer		Charles Pierre Melly	
Time	Votes	%	Votes	%
11:00	163	49%	167	51%
11:30	205	50%	204	50%
12:00	231	52%	217	48%
12:30	257	52%	241	48%
13:00	272	52%	249	48%
13:30	281	51%	266	49%
14:00	287	51%	277	49%
15:00	318	51%	304	49%
15:30	328	51%	313	49%
16:00	348	51%	330	49%

=== Great George ===
No. 9 Great George
Party	Candidate	Votes	%	±%
Conservative	Isaac Jackson	235	51%	
Liberal	John Rogers *	222	49%	
Majority		13	2%	N/A
Registered electors				
Turnout		457		
Conservative gain from Liberal		Swing		

Time	Isaac Jackson		John Rogers	
Time	Votes	%	Votes	%
11:00	157	51%	151	49%
11:30	166	51%	157	49%
12:00	174	51%	164	49%
12:30	181	51%	171	49%
13:00	197	52%	182	48%
13:30	205	52%	187	48%
14:00	217	52%	201	48%
15:00	223	52%	209	48%
15:30	231	52%	214	48%
16:00	235	51%	222	49%

=== Lime Street ===
No. 12 Lime Street
Party	Candidate	Votes	%	±%
Liberal	James Allanson Picton *	unopposed		
Registered electors				
Liberal hold		Swing		

=== North Toxteth ===
No. 16 North Toxteth
Party	Candidate	Votes	%	±%
Conservative	Joseph Harrison *	497	58%	
Liberal	Ewing Whittle	365	42%	
Majority		132	16%	
Registered electors				
Turnout		862		
Conservative hold		Swing		

Time	Joseph Harrison		Ewing Whittle	
Time	Votes	%	Votes	%
11:00	158	57%	120	43%
11:30	199	55%	160	45%
12:00	251	56%	196	44%
12:30	285	57%	217	43%
13:00	345	57%	265	43%
13:30	378	57%	283	43%
14:00	419	57%	312	43%
15:00	473	58%	344	42%
15:30	485	58%	349	42%
16:00	497	58%	365	42%

=== Pitt Street ===
No. 8 Pitt Street
Party	Candidate	Votes	%	±%
Conservative	John Rimmer	216	52%	
Liberal	William McMillen	197	48%	
Majority		19	4%	
Registered electors				
Turnout		413		
Conservative gain from Liberal		Swing		

Time	John Rimmer		William McMillen	
Time	Votes	%	Votes	%
11:00	107	49%	111	51%
11:30	135	52%	123	48%
12:00	154	52%	141	48%
12:30	166	53%	147	47%
13:00	183	53%	165	47%
13:30	183	53%	165	47%
14:00	192	53%	171	47%
15:00	210	52%	192	48%
15:30	214	52%	195	48%
16:00	216	52%	197	48%

=== Rodney Street ===
No. 10 Rodney Street
Party	Candidate	Votes	%	±%
Conservative	James Jack	424	52%	
Liberal	Thomas Bulley Job *	388	48%	
Majority		36	4%	N/A
Registered electors				
Turnout		812		
Conservative gain from Liberal		Swing		

=== St. Anne Street ===
No. 13 St. Anne Street
Party	Candidate	Votes	%	±%
Conservative	Dr. John Stopford Taylor	244	56%	
Liberal	William Bottomly Bairstow *	191	44%	
Majority		53	12%	N/A
Registered electors				
Turnout		435		
Conservative gain from Liberal		Swing		

=== St. Paul's ===
No. 4 St. Paul's
Party	Candidate	Votes	%	±%
Liberal	Maurice Williams	252	75%	
Conservative	Lewis Hornblower	85	25%	
Majority		167	50%	
Registered electors				
Turnout		337		
Liberal hold		Swing		

Time	Maurice Williams		Lewis Hornblower	
Time	Votes	%	Votes	%
11:00	156	74%	55	26%
11:30	166	75%	55	25%
12:00	191	75%	64	25%
12:30	208	75%	70	25%
13:00	222	74%	76	26%
13:30	227	74%	78	26%
14:00	231	75%	79	25%
15:00	244	74%	84	26%
15:30	245	74%	85	26%
16:00	252	75%	85	25%

=== St. Peter's ===
No. 7 St. Peter's
Party	Candidate	Votes	%	±%
	David Rae *	unopposed		
Registered electors				
	gain from	Swing		

=== Scotland ===
No. 2 Scotland
Party	Candidate	Votes	%	±%
Liberal	Joseph Robinson	unopposed		
Registered electors				
Liberal hold		Swing		

=== South Toxteth ===
No. 15 South Toxteth
Party	Candidate	Votes	%	±%
Conservative	John Brandreth Hughes	490	55%	
Liberal	Horace Seymour Alpass *	407	45%	
Majority		83	10%	N/A
Registered electors				
Turnout		897		
Conservative gain from Liberal		Swing		

=== Vauxhall ===
No. 3 Vauxhall
Party	Candidate	Votes	%	±%
Conservative	Thomas Rigby	159	67%	
Liberal	Robert Bradbury	77	33%	
Majority		82	34%	N/A
Registered electors				
Turnout		236		
Conservative gain from Liberal		Swing		

Time	Thomas Rigby		Robert Bradbury	
Time	Votes	%	Votes	%
11:00	104	65%	55	35%
11:30	114	66%	59	34%
12:00	125	67%	62	33%
12:30	134	67%	66	33%
13:00	147	68%	68	32%
13:30	149	68%	71	32%
14:00	153	68%	73	32%
15:00	157	68%	75	32%
15:30	157	68%	75	32%
16:00	159	67%	77	33%

=== West Derby ===
No. 14 West Derby
Party	Candidate	Votes	%	±%
Conservative	Edward Samuelson *	700	51%	
Liberal	Peter George Heyworth	667	49%	
Majority		33	2%	
Registered electors				
Turnout		1,367		
Conservative hold		Swing		

== By-elections ==
The death of Councillor James Crellin was reported to the Council meeting on 14 December 1864.

== See also ==
- Liverpool City Council
- Liverpool Town Council elections 1835 - 1879
- Liverpool City Council elections 1880–present
- Mayors and Lord Mayors of Liverpool 1207 to present
- History of local government in England
