= 1890 Liverpool City Council election =

Liverpool Town Council elections 1890

← 1889	November 1, 1890	1891 →

16 seats were up for election (one third): one seat for each of the 16 wards 33 (incl. Aldermen) seats needed for a majority

Elections to Liverpool City Council were held on Saturday 1 November 1890. One third of the council seats were up for election, the term of office of each councillor being three years.

After the election, the composition of the council was:

Party	Councillors	±	Aldermen	Total
Conservative	??	-5	16	??
Liberal	??	+5	0	??
Irish Nationalists	6	+1	0	6
Independent	1	+1	0	1

== Election result ==
Liverpool local election result 1890
Party	Seats	Gains	Losses	Net gain/loss	Seats %	Votes %	Votes	+/−
Conservative	4	0	6	-6	25%	49%	18,864	
Liberal	9	5	0	+5	56%	28%	10,868	
Irish Nationalist	2	0	0	0	13%	7.9%	3,076	
Independent	1	1	0	+1	6.3%	8.6%	3,320	
Labour	0	0	0	0	0%	6.9%	2,684	

== Ward results ==
* - Retiring Councillor seeking re-election

=== Abercromby ===
No. 11 Abercromby
Party	Candidate	Votes	%	±%
Liberal	John Lea	836	53%	
Conservative	William James Burgess	734	47%	
Majority		102	6%	N/A
Registered electors		2,223		
Turnout		1,570	71%	
Liberal gain from Conservative		Swing		

=== Castle Street ===
No. 6 Castle Street
Party	Candidate	Votes	%	±%
Conservative	Joseph Bond Morgan *	776	55%	
Liberal	William Crosfield	642	45%	
Majority		134	10%	
Registered electors		2,166		
Turnout		1,418	65%	
Conservative hold		Swing		

=== Everton ===
No. 1 Everton
Party	Candidate	Votes	%	±%
Conservative	James Barklay Smith *	5,566	63%	
Liberal	Eli Brooks	3,045	34%	
Labour	Thomas Murphy	169	1.8%	
Independent	William Saxton	74	0.84%	
Majority		2,521	31%	
Registered electors		23,145		
Turnout		8,844	38%	
Conservative hold		Swing		

=== Exchange ===
No. 5 Exchange
Party	Candidate	Votes	%	±%
Liberal	Edmond Brownbill	872	57%	
Conservative	William Charles Green	659	43%	
Majority		213	14%	N/A
Registered electors		2,154		
Turnout		1,531	71%	
Liberal gain from Conservative		Swing		

=== Great George ===
No. 9 Great George
Party	Candidate	Votes	%	±%
Liberal	Edward Paull *	451	60%	
Conservative	William Roberts	299	40%	
Majority		152	20%	
Registered electors		1,059		
Turnout		750	71%	
Liberal hold		Swing		

=== Lime Street ===
No. 12 Lime Street
Party	Candidate	Votes	%	±%
Liberal	Thomas Davy Laurence	604	54%	
Conservative	Henry Fitzwilliam Neale	512	46%	
Majority		92	8%	N/A
Registered electors		1,492		
Turnout		1,116	75%	
Liberal gain from Conservative		Swing		

=== North Toxteth ===
No. 16 North Toxteth
Party	Candidate	Votes	%	±%
Independent	William Edward Willink	3,246	59%	
Conservative	Thomas Henry William Walker	2,274	41%	
Majority		972	18%	N/A
Registered electors		9,618		
Turnout		5,520	57%	
Independent gain from Conservative		Swing		

=== Pitt Street ===
No. 8 Pitt Street
Party	Candidate	Votes	%	±%
Liberal	Francis Joseph McAdam *	308	66%	
Conservative	William King	161	34%	
Majority		147	32%	
Registered electors		710		
Turnout		469	66%	
Liberal hold		Swing		

=== Rodney Street ===
No. 10 Rodney Street
Party	Candidate	Votes	%	±%
Liberal	Frederick Smith *	801	51%	
Conservative	Major Matthew Henry Larmor	773	49%	
Majority		28	2%	
Registered electors		2,329		
Turnout		1,574	68%	
Liberal hold		Swing		

=== St. Anne Street ===
No. 13 St. Anne Street
Party	Candidate	Votes	%	±%
Liberal	Jacob Reuben Grant	939	56%	
Conservative	William Clarkson *	732	44%	
Majority		207	12%	N/A
Registered electors		2,172		
Turnout		1,671	77%	
Liberal gain from Conservative		Swing		

=== St. Paul's ===
No. 4 St. Paul's
Party	Candidate	Votes	%	±%
Liberal	Nathaniel Topp	525	56%	
Conservative	Frank John Leslie	405	44%	
Majority		120	12%	N/A
Registered electors		1,342		
Turnout		930	69%	
Liberal gain from Conservative		Swing		

=== St. Peter's ===
No. 7 St. Peter's
Party	Candidate	Votes	%	±%
Liberal	William Benjamin Bowring *	Unopposed	N/A	N/A
Registered electors				
Liberal hold				

=== Scotland ===
No. 2 Scotland
Party	Candidate	Votes	%	±%
Irish Nationalist	Edward Purcell *	2,534	70%	
Conservative	Richard Beckett	1,097	30%	
Majority		1,446	40%	
Registered electors		6,824		
Turnout		3,640	53%	
Irish Nationalist hold		Swing		

=== South Toxteth ===
No. 15 South Toxteth
Party	Candidate	Votes	%	±%
Conservative	Joseph Ball *	1,939	51%	
Liberal	Joseph Paul Brunner	1,845	49%	
Majority		94	2%	
Registered electors		5,968		
Turnout		3,784	63%	
Conservative hold		Swing		

=== Vauxhall ===
No. 3 Vauxhall
Party	Candidate	Votes	%	±%
Irish Nationalist	Thomas Kelly	533	79%	
Conservative	Major John McCabe	139	21%	
Majority		394	58%	
Registered electors		1,002		
Turnout		672	67%	
Irish Nationalist hold		Swing		

=== West Derby ===
No. 14 West Derby
Party	Candidate	Votes	%	±%
Conservative	George Barrell Rodway	2,798	53%	
Labour	William Mafkin	2.525	47%	
Majority		273	6%	
Registered electors		10,700		
Turnout		5,323	50%	
Conservative hold		Swing		

== By-elections ==
=== No. 16, North Toxteth, 19 March 1891 ===
Caused by the death of Alderman Anthony Bower on 31 January 1891. Following this Councillor Thomas Hughes (Conservative, North Toxteth, elected 1 November 1888) was elected as an Alderman by the Council on 4 March 1891 resulting in a vacancy in the North Toxteth ward.

No. 16 North Toxteth
Party	Candidate	Votes	%	±%
Conservative	William James Burgess	2,326	51%	
Liberal	John Lamport Eills	2,212	49%	
Majority		114	2%	
Registered electors		9,618		
Turnout		4,538	47%	
Conservative hold		Swing		

== See also ==
- Liverpool City Council
- Liverpool Town Council elections 1835 - 1879
- Liverpool City Council elections 1880–present
- Mayors and Lord Mayors of Liverpool 1207 to present
- History of local government in England
