= 1893 Liverpool City Council election =

Liverpool City Council elections 1893

- November 1, 1893

16 seats were up for election (one third): one seat for each of the 16 wards 33 (incl. Aldermen) seats needed for a majority

Elections to Liverpool City Council were held on Wednesday 1 November 1893. One third of the council seats were up for election, the term of office of each councillor being three years.

Four of the sixteen seats were uncontested.

After the election, the composition of the council was:

Party	Councillors	±	Aldermen	Total
Conservative	??	??	8	??
Liberal	??	??	6	??
Irish Nationalists	5	0	2	7
Independent Irish Nationalist	1	0	0	1
Liberal Unionist	1	0	0	1

== Election result ==
Liverpool local election result 1893
Party	Seats	Gains	Losses	Net gain/loss	Seats %	Votes %	Votes	+/−
Conservative	8	3	0	+3	50%	58%	21,136	
Liberal	6	0	3	-3	38%	33%	12,086	
Irish Nationalist	2	0	0	0	12.5%	6.4%	2,321	
Labour	0	0	0	0	0%	2.2%	818	

== Ward results ==
* - Retiring Councillor seeking re-election

=== Abercromby ===
No. 11 Abercromby
Party	Candidate	Votes	%	±%
Conservative	Morris Paterson Jones	781	50.2%	
Liberal	John Lea *	774	49.8%	
Majority		7	0.4%	N/A
Registered electors				
Turnout		1,555		
Conservative gain from Liberal		Swing		

=== Castle Street ===
No. 6 Castle Street
Party	Candidate	Votes	%	±%
Conservative	Joseph Bond Morgan *	836	59%	
Liberal	George Jager the younger	580	41%	
Majority		256	18%	
Registered electors		2,157		
Turnout		1,416		
Conservative hold		Swing		

=== Everton ===
No. 1 Everton
Party	Candidate	Votes	%	±%
Conservative	Joseph Hoult	7,912	66%	
Labour & Liberal	Charles McLeod	4,145	34%	
Majority				
Registered electors				
Turnout		12,057		
Conservative hold		Swing		

=== Exchange ===
No. 5 Exchange
Party	Candidate	Votes	%	±%
Liberal	Edmond Brownbill *	unopposed		
Registered electors				
Liberal hold		Swing		

=== Great George ===
No. 9 Great George
Party	Candidate	Votes	%	±%
Liberal	Edward Paull *	unopposed		
Registered electors				
Liberal hold		Swing		

=== Lime Street ===
No. 12 Lime Street
Party	Candidate	Votes	%	±%
Conservative	Richard Ripley	642	54%	
Liberal	Thomas Davy Laurence *	558	47%	
Majority		84		
Registered electors				
Turnout		1,200		
Conservative gain from Liberal		Swing		

=== North Toxteth ===
No. 16 North Toxteth
Party	Candidate	Votes	%	±%
	William Edward Willink *	1,823	83%	
Labour	Patrick Flynn	385	17%	
Majority		1,438		
Registered electors				
Turnout		2,208		
		Swing		

=== Pitt Street ===
No. 8 Pitt Street
Party	Candidate	Votes	%	±%
Liberal	Dr. Joseph George McCann	306	62%	
Conservative	Isaac Ashton	187	38%	
Majority		119	24%	
Registered electors		728		
Turnout		493	68%	
Liberal hold		Swing		

=== Rodney Street ===
No. 10 Rodney Street
Party	Candidate	Votes	%	±%
Conservative	Maxwell Hyslop Maxwell jun.	926	57%	
Liberal	Charles Lancaster	696	43%	
Majority		926	14%	N/A
Registered electors				
Turnout		1,622		
Conservative gain from Liberal		Swing		

=== St. Anne Street ===
No. 13 St. Anne Street
Party	Candidate	Votes	%	±%
Liberal	Jacob Reuben Grant *	unopposed		
Registered electors				
Liberal hold		Swing		

=== St. Paul's ===
No. 4 St. Paul's
Party	Candidate	Votes	%	±%
Liberal	Nathaniel Topp *	484	52%	
Conservative	Robert Atwood Beaver	442	47%	
Labour	Edward Kaney	8	0.86%	
Majority		42		
Registered electors		1,232		
Turnout		934	76%	
Liberal hold		Swing		

=== St. Peter's ===
No. 7 St. Peter's
Party	Candidate	Votes	%	±%
Liberal	Samuel Hough	515	52%	
Conservative	John Wannop	480	48%	
Majority		35	4%	
Registered electors		1,430		
Turnout		995	70%	
Liberal hold		Swing		

=== Scotland ===
No. 1 Scotland
Party	Candidate	Votes	%	±%
Irish Nationalist	Edward Purcell *	2,321	70%	
Conservative	George Turner	977	30%	
Majority		1,344	40%	
Registered electors				
Turnout		3,298		
Irish Nationalist hold		Swing		

=== South Toxteth ===
No. 15 South Toxteth
Party	Candidate	Votes	%	±%
Conservative	Joseph Ball *	2,157	56%	
Liberal	John Thomas Warrington	1,693	44%	
Majority		464	12%	
Registered electors		3,850		
Turnout				
Conservative hold		Swing		

=== Vauxhall ===
No. 3 Vauxhall
Party	Candidate	Votes	%	±%
Irish Nationalist	Thomas Kelly	unopposed		
Registered electors				
Irish Nationalist hold		Swing		

=== West Derby ===
No. 14 West Derby
Party	Candidate	Votes	%	±%
Conservative	Dr. Thomas Clarke	3,973	59%	
Liberal	John Henderson	2,335	35%	
Labour	Samuel Reeves	425	6%	
Majority		1,638	24%	
Registered electors				
Turnout		6,733		
Conservative hold		Swing		

== By-elections ==
=== No. 15, South Toxteth, 20 February 1894 ===
Caused by the resignation of Councillor James De Bels Adam (Conservative, South Toxteth, elected 1 November 1891), which was reported to the Council on 7 February 1894.

No. 15 South Toxteth
Party	Candidate	Votes	%	±%
Conservative	Thomas Evans	unopposed		
Registered electors		3,850		
Conservative hold		Swing		

=== No. 6 Castle Street, 19 June 1894 ===
Caused by the resignation of Councillor Henry Hugh Hornby (Liberal Unionist, Castle Street, elected 1 November 1892), which was reported to the Council on 6 June 1894.

No. 6 Castle Street
Party	Candidate	Votes	%	±%
Liberal Unionist	Henry Hugh Hornby JP *	unopposed		
Registered electors		2,157		
Liberal Unionist hold		Swing		

== See also ==
- Liverpool City Council
- Liverpool Town Council elections 1835 - 1879
- Liverpool City Council elections 1880–present
- Mayors and Lord Mayors of Liverpool 1207 to present
- History of local government in England
