= 1856 Liverpool Town Council election =

English local election

← 1855	November 1, 1856	1857 →

16 seats were up for election: one seat for each of the 16 wards 33 (incl. Aldermen) seats needed for a majority

Elections to Liverpool Town Council were held on Monday 2 November 1856. One third of the council seats were up for election, the term of office of each councillor being three years.

Eleven of the sixteen wards were uncontested.

After the election, the composition of the council was:

Party	Councillors	±	Aldermen	Total
Conservative	??	??	??	??
Liberal	??	??	??	??

== Election result ==
Liverpool local election result 1856
Party	Seats	Gains	Losses	Net gain/loss	Seats %	Votes %	Votes	+/−
Conservative								
Whig								

Because of the large number of uncontested seats, these statistics should be taken in that context.

== Ward results ==
* - Retiring Councillor seeking re-election

=== Abercromby ===
No. 11 Abercromby
Party	Candidate	Votes	%	±%
Whig	William Earle	unopposed		
Registered electors				
Whig hold		Swing		

=== Castle Street ===
No. 6 Castle Street
Party	Candidate	Votes	%	±%
Whig	James Steains	unopposed		
Registered electors				
Whig gain from Conservative		Swing		

=== Everton ===
No. 1 Everton
Party	Candidate	Votes	%	±%
Whig	John Johnson Stitt	573	51%	
Conservative	John Longton	559	49%	
Majority		7	2%	N/A
Registered electors				
Turnout		1,132		
Whig gain from Conservative		Swing		

=== Exchange ===
No. 5 Exchange
Party	Candidate	Votes	%	±%
Conservative	Charles Turner *	unopposed		
Registered electors				
Conservative hold		Swing		

=== Great George ===
No. 9 Great George
Party	Candidate	Votes	%	±%
Conservative	Alexander Shand *	107	93%	
Whig	William Gibson	8	7%	
Majority		99	86%	
Registered electors				
Turnout		115		
Conservative hold		Swing		

=== Lime Street ===
No. 12 Lime Street
Party	Candidate	Votes	%	±%
Whig	James Reddecliffe Jeffrey	430	54%	
Conservative	John Buck Lloyd *	359	46%	
Majority		71	8%	N/A
Registered electors		957		
Turnout		789	82%	
Whig gain from Conservative		Swing		

=== North Toxteth ===
No. 16 North Toxteth
Party	Candidate	Votes	%	±%
	William Hollis Anthony	unopposed		
Registered electors				
	gain from	Swing		

=== Pitt Street ===
No. 8 Pitt Street
Party	Candidate	Votes	%	±%
Conservative	Walter Powell Jeffreys *	unopposed		
Registered electors				
Conservative hold		Swing		

=== Rodney Street ===
No. 10 Rodney Street
Party	Candidate	Votes	%	±%
Conservative	James Aspinall Tobin *	236	81%	
Whig	George Holt	54	19%	
Majority		182	62%	
Registered electors				
Turnout		290		
Conservative hold		Swing		

=== St. Anne Street ===
No. 13 St. Anne Street
Party	Candidate	Votes	%	±%
Whig	James Mellor	204	83%	
Conservative	Hugh Molyneux	123	38%	
Majority		81	45%	N/A
Registered electors				
Turnout		246		
Whig gain from Conservative		Swing		

=== St. Paul's ===
No. 4 St. Paul's
Party	Candidate	Votes	%	±%
Whig	Oliver Holden *	unopposed		
Registered electors				
Whig hold		Swing		

=== St. Peter's ===
No. 7 St. Peter's
Party	Candidate	Votes	%	±%
Conservative	James Holme *	unopposed		
Registered electors				
Conservative hold		Swing		

=== Scotland ===
No. 2 Scotland
Party	Candidate	Votes	%	±%
Conservative	John Woodruff *	unopposed		
Registered electors				
Conservative hold		Swing		

=== South Toxteth ===
No. 15 South Toxteth
Party	Candidate	Votes	%	±%
	James Robertson	unopposed		
Registered electors				
	gain from	Swing		

=== Vauxhall ===
No. 3 Vauxhall
Party	Candidate	Votes	%	±%
	William Nicholson *	unopposed		
Registered electors				
		Swing		

=== West Derby ===
No. 14 West Derby
Party	Candidate	Votes	%	±%
Whig	Francis Anderson Clint *	unopposed		
Registered electors				
Whig hold		Swing		

== Aldermanic Elections ==
On 10 November 1856, the term of office of eight aldermen who were elected on 9 November 1850 expired.

The following were elected as Aldermen by the Council on 10 November 1856 for a term of office of six years.

* - re-elected Alderman.

Party	Alderman
Conservative	William Bennett *
Reformer	William Preston *
Conservative	Thomas Dover *
Conservative	Thomas Robinson *
Conservative	John Haywood Turner *
Conservative	George Henry Horsfall
Reformer	Thomas Chilton
Conservative	Raymond William Houghton

== See also ==
- Liverpool Town Council elections 1835 - 1879
- Liverpool City Council elections 1880–present
- Mayors and Lord Mayors of Liverpool 1207 to present
- History of local government in England
