= 1894 Liverpool City Council election =

Liverpool City Council elections 1894

- November 1, 1894

16 seats were up for election (one third): one seat for each of the 16 wards 33 (incl. Aldermen) seats needed for a majority

Elections to Liverpool City Council were held on Thursday 1 November 1894. One third of the council seats were up for election, the term of office of each councillor being three years.

Eleven of the sixteen seats were uncontested.

After the election, the composition of the council was:

Party	Councillors	±	Aldermen	Total
Conservative	20	0	8	28
Liberal	21	-2	6	27
Irish Nationalists	5	+2	2	7
Independent Irish Nationalist	1	0	0	1
Liberal Unionist	1	0	0	1

== Election result ==
Liverpool local election result 1894
Party	Seats	Gains	Losses	Net gain/loss	Seats %	Votes %	Votes	+/−
Conservative	7	0	0	0	44%	69%	8,537	
Liberal	7	0	2	-2	44%	10%	1,208	
Irish Nationalist	2	2	0	+2	12.5%			
Labour	0	0	0	0	0%	15%	1,902	

Because of the large number of uncontested seats, these statistics should be taken in that context.

== Ward results ==
* - Retiring Councillor seeking re-election

=== Abercromby ===
No. 11 Abercromby
Party	Candidate	Votes	%	±%
Conservative	Thomas Menlove	691	94%	
Labour	John O'Brien	41	5.6%	
Majority		650		
Registered electors				
Turnout		732		
Conservative hold		Swing		

=== Castle Street ===
No. 6 Castle Street
Party	Candidate	Votes	%	±%
Conservative	William Bartlett *	unopposed		
Registered electors				
Conservative hold		Swing		

=== Everton ===
No. 1 Everton
Party	Candidate	Votes	%	±%
Conservative	John Houlding *	4,737	89%	
Labour	John Naylor	568	11%	
Majority		4,169	78%	
Registered electors				
Turnout		5,305		
Conservative hold		Swing		

=== Exchange ===
No. 5 Exchange
Party	Candidate	Votes	%	±%
Liberal	James Alphonse Doughan *	unopposed		
Registered electors				
Liberal hold		Swing		

=== Great George ===
No. 9 Great George
Party	Candidate	Votes	%	±%
Liberal	John Lamport Eills	unopposed		
Registered electors				
Liberal hold		Swing		

=== Lime Street ===
No. 12 Lime Street
Party	Candidate	Votes	%	±%
Conservative	Charles Petrie *	unopposed		
Registered electors				
Conservative hold		Swing		

=== North Toxteth ===
No. 16 North Toxteth
Party	Candidate	Votes	%	±%
Conservative	William James Burgess *	unopposed		
Registered electors				
Conservative hold		Swing		

=== Pitt Street ===
No. 8 Pitt Street
Party	Candidate	Votes	%	±%
Liberal	John Scott *	unopposed		
Registered electors				
Liberal hold		Swing		

=== Rodney Street ===
No. 10 Rodney Street
Party	Candidate	Votes	%	±%
Liberal	William Henry Picton *	555	93%	
Labour	William Gibson	43	7.2%	
Registered electors				
Liberal hold		Swing		

=== St. Anne Street ===
No. 13 St. Anne Street
Party	Candidate	Votes	%	±%
Liberal	Samuel McMillin *	653	66%	
Labour	John Callow	337	34%	
Labour	Aaron John Fowler	28	2.8%	
Majority		316	32%	
Registered electors				
Turnout		990		
Liberal hold		Swing		

=== St. Paul's ===
No. 4 St. Paul's
Party	Candidate	Votes	%	±%
Liberal	Richard Robert Meade-King *	unopposed		
Registered electors				
Liberal hold		Swing		

=== St. Peter's ===
No. 7 St. Peter's
Party	Candidate	Votes	%	±%
Liberal	George Grierson *	unopposed		
Registered electors				
Liberal hold		Swing		

=== Scotland ===
No. 1 Scotland
Party	Candidate	Votes	%	±%
Irish Nationalist	Patrick Kearney	unopposed		
Registered electors				
Irish Nationalist gain from Liberal		Swing		

=== South Toxteth ===
No. 15 South Toxteth
Party	Candidate	Votes	%	±%
Conservative	Thomas Evans	unopposed		
Registered electors				
Conservative hold		Swing		

=== Vauxhall ===
No. 3 Vauxhall
Party	Candidate	Votes	%	±%
Irish Nationalist	Thomas John Flynn	unopposed		
Registered electors				
Irish Nationalist gain from Liberal		Swing		

=== West Derby ===
No. 14 West Derby
Party	Candidate	Votes	%	±%
Conservative	Edward Hatton Cookson *	3,800	81%	
Labour	Samuel Reeves	885	19%	
Majority		2,915	62%	
Registered electors		11,825		
Turnout		4,685	40%	
Conservative hold		Swing		

== By-elections ==
Councillor Thomas Kelly (Irish Nationalist, Vauxhall, elected 1 November 1893) died on 17 October 1895.

As the November 1895 election was near and an all-up election, there was no by-election.

== See also ==
- Liverpool City Council
- Liverpool Town Council elections 1835 - 1879
- Liverpool City Council elections 1880–present
- Mayors and Lord Mayors of Liverpool 1207 to present
- History of local government in England
