= 1866 Liverpool Town Council election =

English local election

- November 1, 1866

16 seats were up for election: one seat for each of the 16 wards 33 (incl. Aldermen) seats needed for a majority

Elections to Liverpool Town Council were held on Thursday 1 November 1866. One third of the council seats were up for election, the term of office of each councillor being three years.

Twelve of the sixteen wards were uncontested.

After the election, the composition of the council was:

Party	Councillors	±	Aldermen	Total
Conservative	??	??	16	??
Liberal	??	??	0	??

== Election result ==
Liverpool local election result 1866
Party	Seats	Gains	Losses	Net gain/loss	Seats %	Votes %	Votes	+/−
Conservative	7	2	3	-1	44%			
Liberal	9	3	2	+1	56%			

Because twelve of the sixteen seats were uncontested seats, these statistics should be taken in that context.

== Ward results ==
* - Retiring Councillor seeking re-election

=== Abercromby ===
No. 11 Abercromby
Party	Candidate	Votes	%	±%
Liberal	Charles Pierre Melly	unopposed		
Registered electors				
Turnout				
Liberal gain from Conservative		Swing		

=== Castle Street ===
No. 6 Castle Street
Party	Candidate	Votes	%	±%
Liberal	Samuel Greg Rathbone *	unopposed		
Registered electors				
Liberal hold		Swing		

=== Everton ===
No. 1 Everton
Party	Candidate	Votes	%	±%
Conservative	John Pearson	unopposed		
Registered electors				
Conservative hold		Swing		

=== Exchange ===
No. 5 Exchange
Party	Candidate	Votes	%	±%
Liberal	William Barry *	unopposed		
Registered electors				
Liberal hold		Swing		

=== Great George ===
No. 9 Great George
Party	Candidate	Votes	%	±%
Liberal	John Rogers	233	50.2%	
Conservative	James Sykes	231	49.8%	
Majority		2	0.4%	N/A
Registered electors				
Turnout		464		
Liberal gain from Conservative		Swing		

=== Lime Street ===
No. 12 Lime Street
Party	Candidate	Votes	%	±%
Conservative	Richard Rowlands Minton	357	54%	
Liberal	H. S. Alpass	309	46%	
Majority		48	8%	N/A
Registered electors				
Turnout		666		
Conservative gain from Liberal		Swing		

=== North Toxteth ===
No. 16 North Toxteth
Party	Candidate	Votes	%	±%
Conservative	Edward Lawrence *	unopposed		
Registered electors				
Conservative hold		Swing		

=== Pitt Street ===
No. 8 Pitt Street
Party	Candidate	Votes	%	±%
Conservative	Henry Jennings	202	52%	
Liberal	James Steel	187	48%	
Majority		15	4%	
Registered electors				
Turnout		389		
Conservative hold		Swing		

=== Rodney Street ===
No. 10 Rodney Street
Party	Candidate	Votes	%	±%
Liberal	Thomas Gair	unopposed		
Registered electors				
Liberal hold		Swing		

=== St. Anne Street ===
No. 13 St. Anne Street
Party	Candidate	Votes	%	±%
Conservative	Arthur P. Fletcher	238	60%	
Liberal	Dr. Edward Watts	158	40%	
Majority		80	20%	N/A
Registered electors				
Turnout		396		
Conservative gain from Liberal		Swing		

=== St. Paul's ===
No. 4 St. Paul's
Party	Candidate	Votes	%	±%
Conservative	William Barton *	unopposed		
Registered electors				
Conservative hold		Swing		

=== St. Peter's ===
No. 7 St. Peter's
Party	Candidate	Votes	%	±%
Liberal	Charles Tricks Bowring *	unopposed		
Registered electors				
Liberal hold		Swing		

=== Scotland ===
No. 2 Scotland
Party	Candidate	Votes	%	±%
Liberal	William Williams *	unopposed		
Registered electors				
Liberal hold		Swing		

=== South Toxteth ===
No. 15 South Toxteth
Party	Candidate	Votes	%	±%
Liberal	William Cowley Miller	unopposed		
Registered electors				
Liberal gain from Conservative		Swing		

=== Vauxhall ===
No. 3 Vauxhall
Party	Candidate	Votes	%	±%
Liberal	James Whitty *	unopposed		
Registered electors				
Liberal hold		Swing		

=== West Derby ===
No. 14 West Derby
Party	Candidate	Votes	%	±%
Conservative	John Birch Melladew *	unopposed		
Registered electors				
Conservative hold		Swing		

== By-elections ==
=== No. 6, Castle Street, 1 November 1866 - 2 seats ===
Caused by the retirements of Councillors John Cheshyre Blythe (Conservative, elected for the Castle Street ward on 1 November 1864) and Thomas Chilton (Liberal, elected 1 November 1865).

No. 6 Castle Street
Party	Candidate	Votes	%	±%
Conservative	Thomas Woodburn			
Liberal	Thomas Avison			
Majority				
Registered electors				
Turnout				
Conservative hold		Swing		
Liberal hold		Swing		

=== No. 10, Rodney Street, 1 November 1866 ===
Caused by the retirement of Councillor C. J. English (Liberal, Rodney Street, elected 1 November 1865)

No. 10 Rodney Street
Party	Candidate	Votes	%	±%
	Thomas Dawson			
Majority				
Registered electors				
Turnout				
		Swing		

=== No. 13, St. Anne Street, 1 January 1867 ===
Caused by the resignation of Councillor Joseph Bennion (Conservative, elected 1 November 1865)

No. 13 St. Anne Street
Party	Candidate	Votes	%	±%
Liberal	William Dawbarn			
Majority				
Registered electors				
Turnout				
Liberal hold		Swing		

== See also ==
- Liverpool City Council
- Liverpool Town Council elections 1835 - 1879
- Liverpool City Council elections 1880–present
- Mayors and Lord Mayors of Liverpool 1207 to present
- History of local government in England
