= 1879 Liverpool Town Council election =

Liverpool Town Council elections 1879

- November 1, 1879

16 seats were up for election: one seat for each of the 16 wards 33 (incl. Aldermen) seats needed for a majority

Elections to Liverpool Town Council were held on Saturday 1 November 1879. One third of the council seats were up for election, the term of office of each councillor being three years.

Four of the sixteen wards were uncontested.

After the election, the composition of the council was:

Party	Councillors	±	Aldermen	Total
Conservative	??	??	??	??
Liberal	??	??	??	??
Irish Home Rule	5	0	0	5
Independent	1	0	0	1

== Election result ==
Liverpool local election result 1879
Party	Seats	Gains	Losses	Net gain/loss	Seats %	Votes %	Votes	+/−
Conservative	2	0	6	-6	12.5%	48%	17,519	
Liberal	11	6	0	+6	70%	37%	13,572	
Home Rule	2	0	0	0	12.5%	7.7%	2,938	
Independent	1	1	0	+1	6%	7.5%	2,736	

== Ward results ==
* - Retiring Councillor seeking re-election

=== Abercromby ===
No. 11 Abercromby
Party	Candidate	Votes	%	±%
Liberal	Thomas English Stephens	881	50%	
Conservative	Dr. Nicholas Kendrick Marsh	872	50%	
Majority		9	0%	
Registered electors		2,540		
Turnout		1,753	69%	
Liberal hold		Swing		

=== Castle Street ===
No. 6 Castle Street
Party	Candidate	Votes	%	±%
Liberal	Samuel Smith	695	51%	
Conservative	David MacIver *	656	49%	
Majority		39	2%	N/A
Registered electors		1,900		
Turnout		1,351	71%	
Liberal gain from Conservative		Swing		

=== Everton ===
No. 1 Everton
Party	Candidate	Votes	%	±%
Liberal	David Hughes	6,301	50%	
Conservative	Robert Vining *	6,286	50%	
Majority		15	0%	N/A
Registered electors		21,625		
Turnout		12,587	58%	
Liberal gain from Conservative		Swing		

=== Exchange ===
No. 5 Exchange
Party	Candidate	Votes	%	±%
Liberal	Stephen Barker Guion *	unopposed		
Registered electors				
Liberal hold		Swing		

=== Great George ===
No. 9 Great George
Party	Candidate	Votes	%	±%
Liberal	Benjamin Lewis	530	52%	
Conservative	George Peet *	498	48%	
Majority		32	4%	N/A
Registered electors		1,283		
Turnout		1,028	80%	
Liberal gain from Conservative		Swing		

=== Lime Street ===
No. 12 Lime Street
Party	Candidate	Votes	%	±%
Liberal	James Allanson Picton *	unopposed		
Registered electors				
Liberal hold		Swing		

=== North Toxteth ===
No. 16 North Toxteth
Party	Candidate	Votes	%	±%
Conservative	Thomas Hughes	unopposed		
Registered electors				
Conservative hold		Swing		

=== Pitt Street ===
No. 8 Pitt Street
Party	Candidate	Votes	%	±%
Liberal	Jeremiah Miles	371	59%	
Conservative	Robert Andrew Thomas	249	39%	
Conservative	William de Silva	11	2%	
Majority		122	20%	N/A
Registered electors		880		
Turnout		631	72%	
Liberal gain from Conservative		Swing		

=== Rodney Street ===
No. 10 Rodney Street
Party	Candidate	Votes	%	±%
Liberal	Philip Henry Rathbone *	970	56%	
Conservative	John Henstock	751	44%	
Majority		219	12%	
Registered electors		2,542		
Turnout		1,721	68%	
Liberal hold		Swing		

=== St. Anne Street ===
No. 13 St. Anne Street
Party	Candidate	Votes	%	±%
Liberal	Henry Vaughan	1,135	53%	
Conservative	George Fowler *	1,010	47%	
Majority		125	6%	N/A
Registered electors		2,792		
Turnout		2,145	77%	
Liberal gain from Conservative		Swing		

=== St. Paul's ===
No. 4 St. Paul's
Party	Candidate	Votes	%	±%
Liberal	John Davies	697	54%	
Conservative	Thomas Huntington *	602	46%	
Majority		95	8%	N/A
Registered electors		1,803		
Turnout		1,299	72%	
Liberal gain from Conservative		Swing		

=== St. Peter's ===
No. 7 St. Peter's
Party	Candidate	Votes	%	±%
Liberal	Alexander Balfour *	590	53%	
Conservative	John Hughes	531	47%	
Majority		59	6%	
Registered electors		1,602		
Turnout		1,121	70%	
Liberal hold		Swing		

=== Scotland ===
No. 2 Scotland
Party	Candidate	Votes	%	±%
Home Rule	Dr. Alexander Murray Bligh *	2,838	56%	
Conservative	Joshua Siddeley	2,191	44%	
Majority		647	12%	
Registered electors		8,300		
Turnout		5,029	61%	
Home Rule hold		Swing		

=== South Toxteth ===
No. 15 South Toxteth
Party	Candidate	Votes	%	±%
Conservative	William Radcliffe *	1,729	55%	
Liberal	Edward Paull	1,402	45%	
Majority		327	10%	
Registered electors		4,772		
Turnout		3,131	66%	
Conservative hold		Swing		

=== Vauxhall ===
No. 3 Vauxhall
Party	Candidate	Votes	%	±%
Home Rule	Andrew Commins *	unopposed		
Registered electors				
Home Rule hold		Swing		

=== West Derby ===
No. 14 West Derby
Party	Candidate	Votes	%	±%
Independent	William Simpson	2,736	56%	
Conservative	John Nicol *	2,144	44%	
Majority		592	12%	N/A
Registered electors		8,845		
Turnout		4,880	55%	
Independent gain from Conservative		Swing		

== By-elections ==
=== Aldermanic By-Election, 4 February 1880 ===
Caused by the resignation of Alderman Richard Cardwell Gardner.

Former councillor John Nicol (Conservative, West Derby, elected 1 November 1876) was elected as an Alderman by the Council on 4 February 1880.

=== No.16, North Toxteth, 18 February 1880 ===
Caused by the resignation of Alderman John Woodruff.

Councillor Arthur Bower Forwood (Conservative, North Toxteth, elected 1 November 1877) was elected as an Alderman by the Council on 4 February 1880.

No. 16 North Toxteth
Party	Candidate	Votes	%	±%
Conservative	John Hughes	2,595	54%	
	Mr. Matheson	2,223	46%	
Majority		372		
Registered electors				
Turnout				
Conservative hold		Swing		

=== No. 11, Abercromby, 18 February 1880 ===
Caused by Thomas English Stephens (Liberal, Abercromby, elected 1 November 1879) ceasing to be a councillor.

No. 11 Abercromby
Party	Candidate	Votes	%	±%
Conservative	Dr. Nicholas Kendrick Marsh	1,026	51%	
	Mr. Stephens	988	49%	
Majority		38		
Registered electors		2,540		
Turnout		2,014	79%	
Conservative hold		Swing		

=== No. 1 Everton, 18 February 1880 ===
Caused by William Simpson (Independent, West Derby, elected 1 November 1879) ceasing to be a councillor.

No. 1 Everton
Party	Candidate	Votes	%	±%
Conservative	Robert Galloway	8,038	55%	
Liberal	Mr. Hughes	6,590	45%	
Majority		1,448	10%	N/A
Registered electors		21,625		
Turnout		14,628	68%	
Conservative gain from Liberal		Swing		

=== No. 14, West Derby, 23 March 1880 ===
Caused by William Simpson (Independent, West Derby, elected 1 November 1879) ceasing to be a councillor.

No. 14 West Derby
Party	Candidate	Votes	%	±%
Conservative	Samuel Leigh Gregson	3,171	55%	
	Mr. Little	2,640	45%	
Majority		531		
Registered electors		8,845		
Turnout		5,811	66%	
Conservative gain from Independent		Swing		

=== Aldermanic By-Election 5 May 1880 ===
The death of Alderman James Jack was reported to the Council on 5 May 1880. His position was filled when former Councillor David MacIver MP was elected as an Alderman by the Council on 5 May 1880.

=== Aldermanic By-Election, 28 October 1880 ===
The resignation of Alderman Henry Jennings on 21 October 1880, was reported to the Council on 28 October 1880. Hugh Hawthorne Nicholson was elected as an alderman by the Council on 28 October 1880.

== See also ==
- Liverpool City Council
- Liverpool Town Council elections 1835 - 1879
- Liverpool City Council elections 1880–present
- Mayors and Lord Mayors of Liverpool 1207 to present
- History of local government in England
