= 1858 Liverpool Town Council election =

English local election

- 1 November 1858

16 seats were up for election: one seat for each of the 16 wards 33 (incl. Aldermen) seats needed for a majority

Elections to Liverpool Town Council were held on Monday 1 November 1858. One third of the council seats were up for election, the term of office of each councillor being three years.

Eleven of the 16 wards were uncontested.

After the election, the composition of the council was:

Party	Councillors	±	Aldermen	Total
Conservative	??	??	??	37
Whig	??	??	??	27

== Election result ==
Liverpool local election result 1858
Party	Seats	Gains	Losses	Net gain/loss	Seats %	Votes %	Votes	+/−
Conservative	3	0	5	-5	19%	34%	898	
Whig	10	5	0	+5	63%	61%	1,582	

Because of the large number of uncontested seats, these statistics should be taken in that context.

== Ward results ==
* - Retiring Councillor seeking re-election

=== Abercromby ===
No. 11 Abercromby
Party	Candidate	Votes	%	±%
Whig	Robertson Gladstone *	445	65%	
Conservative	Hugh Neil	238	35%	
Majority		207	30%	
Registered electors				
Turnout		683		
Whig hold		Swing		

Time	Robertson Gladstone		Hugh Neil	
Time	Votes	%	Votes	%
11:00	243	69%	110	31%
12:00	292	68%	139	32%
13:00	363	66%	191	34%
14:00	405	65%	215	35%
15:00	426	65%	226	35%
16:00	445	65%	238	35%

Polling Place : The Phoenix Inn, on the east side of Mount Pleasant, occupied by Edward Robinson.

=== Castle Street ===
No. 6 Castle Street
Party	Candidate	Votes	%	±%
Whig	Thomas Avison	432	57%	
Conservative	Joseph Gibbons Livingston	323	43%	
Majority		109	14%	N/A
Registered electors				
Turnout		755		
Whig gain from Conservative		Swing		

Time	Thomas Avison		Joseph Gibbons Livingston	
Time	Votes	%	Votes	%
10:00	128	70%	54	30%
11:00	217	62%	132	38%
12:00	292	57%	223	43%
13:00	359	58%	260	42%
14:00	407	58%	289	42%
15:00	409	58%	297	42%
16:00	428	58%	304	42%

Polling Place : The Commercial Hotel, Dale Street, occupied by Mr. Deakin

=== Everton ===
No. 1 Everton
Party	Candidate	Votes	%	±%
Conservative	Thomas Darnley Anderson *	unopposed		
Registered electors				
Conservative hold		Swing		

The polling place was Halliday's Coffee House, south west corner of Rupert Lane.

=== Exchange ===
No. 5 Exchange
Party	Candidate	Votes	%	±%
Conservative	James Tyrer *	unopposed		
Registered electors				
Conservative hold		Swing		

Polling Place : The north end of the Sessions house in Chapel Street.

=== Great George ===
No. 9 Great George
Party	Candidate	Votes	%	±%
Whig	John Rogers	222	55%	
Conservative	Samuel Abbott	183	45%	
Majority		39	10%	N/A
Registered electors				
Turnout		405		
Whig gain from Conservative		Swing		

Time	John Rogers		Samuel Abbott	
Time	Votes	%	Votes	%
10:00	73	50%	74	50%
11:00	116	52%	105	48%
12:00	143	54%	121	46%
13:00	173	55%	140	45%
14:00	205	56%	161	44%
15:00	216	55%	175	45%
16:00	221	55%	182	45%

Polling Place : The Shop, No. 70, on the north side of Nelson Street, occupied by Edwin Thomas.

=== Lime Street ===
No. 12 Lime Street
Party	Candidate	Votes	%	±%
Whig	James Allanson Picton *	Unopposed	N/A	N/A
Registered electors				
Whig hold				

Polling Place : The House, No. 88, on the south side of London Road, occupied by Edward Ford.

=== North Toxteth ===
No. 16 North Toxteth
Party	Candidate	Votes	%	±%
Whig	John Wakefield Cropper	Unopposed	N/A	N/A
Registered electors				
Whig gain from Conservative				

Polling Place : The house, No. 60, Saint Jame's Place, occupied by William Jones.

=== Pitt Street ===
No. 8 Pitt Street
Party	Candidate	Votes	%	±%
Conservative	Thomas Ridley	unopposed		
Registered electors				
Conservative hold		Swing		

Polling Place : The Committee room of the South Corporation School, in Park Lane.

=== Rodney Street ===
No. 10 Rodney Street
Party	Candidate	Votes	%	±%
Whig	Thomas Bulley Job	Unopposed	N/A	N/A
Registered electors				
Whig gain from Conservative				

Polling Place : The Coffee House, No. 71, near the entrance to the new arcade, on the east side of Renshaw Street, occupied by Mr. Mitchells.

=== St. Anne Street ===
No. 13 St. Anne Street
Party	Candidate	Votes	%	±%
Whig	Thomas Llewelyn Hodson *	Unopposed	N/A	N/A
Registered electors				
Whig hold				

Polling Place : The House of Mrs. Hindle, No. 55 on the west side of Christian Street.

=== St. Paul's ===
No. 4 St. Paul's
Party	Candidate	Votes	%	±%
Whig	John Clerk	186	61%	
Conservative	Thomas Rigby	119	39%	
Majority		67	22%	N/A
Registered electors				
Turnout		305		
Whig gain from Conservative		Swing		

Time	John Clerk		Thomas Rigby	
Time	Votes	%	Votes	%
10:00	40	63%	23	37%
11:00	80	63%	46	37%
12:00	119	68%	57	32%
13:00	140	66%	71	34%
14:00	160	66%	84	34%
15:00	174	65%	92	35%
16:00	185	63%	110	37%

Polling Place : The House of Mr. John Mather, at the north-west corner of St. Paul's Square.

=== St. Peter's ===
No. 7 St. Peter's
Party	Candidate	Votes	%	±%
Whig	David Rae	266	57%	
Whig	John Charles Fernihough *	198	43%	
Majority		68	14%	
Registered electors				
Turnout		464		
Whig gain from Whig		Swing		

Time	David Rae		John Charles Fernihough	
Time	Votes	%	Votes	%
10:00	60	55%	50	45%
11:00	111	55%	91	45%
12:00	166	54%	140	46%
13:00	199	55%	165	45%
14:00	226	56%	176	44%
15:00	252	58%	186	42%
16:00	269	58%	191	42%

Polling Place : The Public House, sign of "The Ring of Bells" in School Lane, occupied by Mr. John Bennion.

=== Scotland ===
No. 2 Scotland
Party	Candidate	Votes	%	±%
Whig	Richard Sheil *	Unopposed	N/A	N/A
Registered electors				
Whig hold				

Polling place : The House, No. 237, on the north side of Burlington Street, occupied by Mr. Des?er.

Richard Sheil was the first Catholic elected to Liverpool Town Council.

=== South Toxteth ===
No. 15 South Toxteth
Party	Candidate	Votes	%	±%
Conservative	John Farnworth *	unopposed		
Registered electors				
Conservative hold		Swing		

Polling Place : The shop on the west side of Park Road, occupied by Eliza Gould, near the church of St. John the Baptist.

=== Vauxhall ===
No. 3 Vauxhall
Party	Candidate	Votes	%	±%
Whig	Roger Haydock *	Unopposed	N/A	N/A
Registered electors				
Whig hold				

Polling Place : The House occupied by Mr. George Gurden, No. 167, on the west side of Vauxhall Road nearly opposite the end of Paul Street.

=== West Derby ===
No. 14 West Derby
Party	Candidate	Votes	%	±%
Whig	John Aikin *	Unopposed	N/A	N/A
Registered electors				
Whig hold				

Polling Place : The House on the south side of Edge Hill, in the occupation of John Jackson, and opposite St. Mary's Church.

== See also ==
Liverpool City Council

Liverpool Town Council elections 1835 - 1879

Liverpool City Council elections 1880–present

Mayors and Lord Mayors of Liverpool 1207 to present

History of local government in England
