= 1873 Liverpool Town Council election =

English local election

- 1 November 1873

16 seats were up for election: one seat for each of the 16 wards 33 (incl. Aldermen) seats needed for a majority

Elections to Liverpool Town Council were held on Monday 1 November 1873. One third of the council seats were up for election, the term of office of each councillor being three years.

Ten of the sixteen wards were uncontested.

After the election, the composition of the council was:

Party	Councillors	±	Aldermen	Total
Conservative	??	??	??	??
Liberal	??	??	??	??

== Election result ==
Liverpool local election result 1873
Party	Seats	Gains	Losses	Net gain/loss	Seats %	Votes %	Votes	+/−
Conservative	9				56%	56%	11,297	
Liberal	7				44%	44%	8,745	

Because of the large number of uncontested seats, these statistics should be taken in that context.

== Ward results ==
* - Retiring Councillor seeking re-election

=== Abercromby ===
No. 11 Abercromby
Party	Candidate	Votes	%	±%
Liberal	Robertson Gladstone *	unopposed		
Registered electors		2,689		
Liberal hold		Swing		

=== Castle Street ===
No. 6 Castle Street
Party	Candidate	Votes	%	±%
Conservative	David MacIver	Unopposed	N/A	N/A
Registered electors		1,897		
Conservative hold				

=== Everton ===
No. 1 Everton
Party	Candidate	Votes	%	±%
Conservative	Robert Vining *	4,929	59%	
Liberal	David Hughes	3,436	41%	
Majority		1,493	18%	
Registered electors		17,742		
Turnout		8,365	47%	
Conservative hold		Swing		

=== Exchange ===
No. 5 Exchange
Party	Candidate	Votes	%	±%
Liberal	Stephen Barker Guion *	unopposed		
Registered electors		2,445		
Liberal hold		Swing		

=== Great George ===
No. 9 Great George
Party	Candidate	Votes	%	±%
Conservative	George Peet	486	50.4%	
Liberal	Edward Lewis	479	49.6%	
Majority		7	0.8%	
Registered electors		1,511		
Turnout		965		
Conservative hold		Swing		

=== Lime Street ===
No. 12 Lime Street
Party	Candidate	Votes	%	±%
Liberal	James Allanson Picton *	unopposed		
Registered electors		2,068		
Liberal hold		Swing		

=== North Toxteth ===
No. 16 North Toxteth
Party	Candidate	Votes	%	±%
Conservative	Joseph Harrison *	1,709	58%	
Liberal	William Pirrie Sinclair	1,236	42%	
Majority		474	16%	
Registered electors		6,000		
Turnout		2,944	49%	
Conservative hold		Swing		

=== Pitt Street ===
No. 8 Pitt Street
Party	Candidate	Votes	%	±%
Conservative	Charles Edward Hamilton *	305	50%	
Liberal	James Steel	303	50%	
Majority		2		
Registered electors		774		
Turnout		608	79%	
Conservative hold		Swing		

=== Rodney Street ===
No. 10 Rodney Street
Party	Candidate	Votes	%	±%
Liberal	Philip Henry Rathbone *	736	58%	
Conservative	Dr. Arthur Brown Steele	533	42%	
Majority		203	16%	
Registered electors		2,689		
Turnout		1,269	47%	
Liberal hold		Swing		

=== St. Anne Street ===
No. 13 St. Anne Street
Party	Candidate	Votes	%	±%
Conservative	Dr. John Stopford Taylor *	unopposed		
Registered electors		2,647		
Conservative hold		Swing		

=== St. Paul's ===
No. 4 St. Paul's
Party	Candidate	Votes	%	±%
Conservative	Thomas Huntington *	unopposed		
Registered electors		2,029		
Conservative hold		Swing		

=== St. Peter's ===
No. 7 St. Peter's
Party	Candidate	Votes	%	±%
Liberal	Alexander Balfour	576	52%	
Conservative	Edward Lewis Wigan	537	48%	
Majority		39		
Registered electors		1,753		
Turnout		1,113	63%	
gain from Liberal		Swing		

=== Scotland ===
No. 2 Scotland
Party	Candidate	Votes	%	±%
Liberal	John McArdle *	unopposed		
Registered electors		9,851		
Liberal hold		Swing		

=== South Toxteth ===
No. 15 South Toxteth
Party	Candidate	Votes	%	±%
Conservative	Isaac Jackson	unopposed		
Registered electors		5,084		
Conservative hold		Swing		

=== Vauxhall ===
No. 3 Vauxhall
Party	Candidate	Votes	%	±%
Liberal	Peter Silvester Bidwell *	unopposed		
Registered electors		2,087		
Liberal hold		Swing		

=== West Derby ===
No. 14 West Derby
Party	Candidate	Votes	%	±%
Conservative	Edward Samuelson *	2,798	59%	
Liberal	Daniel Rowlinson Ratcliff	1,980	41%	
Majority		818	18%	
Registered electors		7,601		
Turnout		4,778	63%	
Conservative hold		Swing		

== By-elections ==
=== No. 13, St. Anne Street, 27 March 1874 ===
Caused by the death of Councillor James Denton (Conservative, St. Anne Street, elected 1 November 1871)

No. 13 St. Anne Street
Party	Candidate	Votes	%	±%
Conservative	Dr. William Cross	514	54%	
	Henry Ashby	323	34%	
	W. N. S. Cope	106	11%	
	John Morrell	16	1.7%	
Majority		191	20%	
Registered electors		2,647		
Turnout		959	36%	
Conservative hold		Swing		

== See also ==
- Liverpool City Council
- Liverpool Town Council elections 1835 - 1879
- Liverpool City Council elections 1880–present
- Mayors and Lord Mayors of Liverpool 1207 to present
- History of local government in England
