= 1850 Liverpool Town Council election =

English local election

- November 1, 1850

16 seats were up for election: one seat for each of the 16 wards 33 (incl. Aldermen) seats needed for a majority

Elections to Liverpool Town Council were held on Friday 1 November 1850. One third of the council seats were up for election, the term of office of each councillor being three years.

Eight of the sixteen wards were uncontested.

After the election, the composition of the council was:

Party	Councillors	±	Aldermen	Total
Conservative	??	+1	??	??
Reformers	??	−1	??	??

== Election result ==
Liverpool local election result 1850
Party	Seats	Gains	Losses	Net gain/loss	Seats %	Votes %	Votes	+/−
Conservative	14	2	1	+1	87.5%			
Whig	2	1	2	-1	12.5%			

== Ward results ==
* – Retiring Councillor seeking re-election

=== Abercromby ===
No. 11 Abercromby
Party	Candidate	Votes	%	±%
Conservative	Richard Cardwell Gardner	Unopposed	N/A	N/A
Registered electors				
Conservative hold				

=== Castle Street ===
No. 6 Castle Street
Party	Candidate	Votes	%	±%
Conservative	George Holt	277	69%	
Whig	John Smith	122	31%	
Majority		155	38%	N/A
Registered electors				
Turnout		399		
Conservative gain from Whig		Swing		

=== Everton ===
No. 1 Everton
Party	Candidate	Votes	%	±%
Conservative	Samuel Moulsdale Mellor	311	51%	
Whig	William Walthew *	294	49%	
Majority		17	2%	N/A
Registered electors				
Turnout		605		
Conservative gain from Whig		Swing		

=== Exchange ===
No. 5 Exchange
Party	Candidate	Votes	%	±%
Conservative	Charles Turner	Unopposed	N/A	N/A
Registered electors				
Conservative hold				

=== Great George ===
No. 9 Great George
Party	Candidate	Votes	%	±%
Conservative	William Ashley Clayton	Unopposed	N/A	N/A
Registered electors				
Conservative hold				

=== Lime Street ===
No. 12 Lime Street
Party	Candidate	Votes	%	±%
Conservative	John Buck Lloyd *	300	64%	
Whig	K. Leversedge	167	36%	
Majority		133	28%	
Registered electors				
Turnout		467		
Conservative hold		Swing		

=== North Toxteth ===
No. 16 North Toxteth
Party	Candidate	Votes	%	±%
Conservative	Matthew Gregson	Unopposed	N/A	N/A
Registered electors				
Conservative hold				

=== Pitt Street ===
No. 8 Pitt Street
Party	Candidate	Votes	%	±%
Conservative	Walter Powell Jeffreys *	Unopposed	N/A	N/A
Registered electors				
Conservative hold				

=== Rodney Street ===
No. 10 Rodney Street
Party	Candidate	Votes	%	±%
Conservative	James Aspinall Tobin *	Unopposed	N/A	N/A
Registered electors				
Conservative hold				

=== St. Anne Street ===
No. 13 St. Anne Street
Party	Candidate	Votes	%	±%
Conservative	John Nicholson	172	54%	
Whig	W. K. Tyrer	144	46%	
Majority		28	8%	
Registered electors				
Turnout		316		
Conservative hold		Swing		

=== St. Paul's ===
No. 4 St. Paul's
Party	Candidate	Votes	%	±%
Whig	Oliver Holden	192	65%	
Conservative	John James	104	35%	
Majority		88	30%	N/A
Registered electors				
Turnout		296		
Whig gain from Conservative		Swing		

=== St. Peter's ===
No. 7 St. Peter's
Party	Candidate	Votes	%	±%
Conservative	James Holme	282	53%	
Whig	William Henderson	248	47%	
Majority		34	6%	
Registered electors		784		
Turnout		530	68%	
Conservative hold		Swing		

=== Scotland ===
No. 2 Scotland
Party	Candidate	Votes	%	±%
Whig	John Woodruff *	327	66%	
Conservative	Raymond William Houghton	172	34%	
Majority		155	32%	
Registered electors				
Turnout		499		
Whig hold		Swing		

=== South Toxteth ===
No. 15 South Toxteth
Party	Candidate	Votes	%	±%
Conservative	Samuel Holme	Unopposed	N/A	N/A
Registered electors				
Conservative hold				

=== Vauxhall ===
No. 3 Vauxhall
Party	Candidate	Votes	%	±%
Whig	William Preston *	Unopposed	N/A	N/A
Registered electors				
Whig hold				

=== West Derby ===
No. 14 West Derby
Party	Candidate	Votes	%	±%
Conservative	James Marks Wood	260	67%	
Whig	Eyre Evans	127	33%	
Majority		133	34%	
Registered electors				
Turnout		387		
Conservative hold		Swing		

== Aldermanic Elections ==
On 9 November 1850, the term of office of eight aldermen who were elected on 9 November 1844 expired.

The following were elected as Aldermen by the council on 9 November 1850 for a term of office of six years.

* – re-elected Alderman.

Party	Alderman
Conservative	William Bennett
Conservative	John Bent *
Conservative	Thomas Dover *
Reformer	Edward Langsdale
Conservative	James Lawrence *
Reformer	William Preston
Conservative	Thomas Robinson
Conservative	John Haywood Turner *

== By-elections ==
=== No. 10, Rodney Street, 1 November 1950 ===
A signed declaration, dated 27 October 1850, from Councillors Bernard Hall, Thomas Wagstaff and John Charles Fernihough was submitted to the council on 29 October 1850 stating that Councillor George Booker (Conservative, Rodney Street, elected 1 November 1848) had been absent from the borough for more than six months. This disqualified Councillor Booker and initiated the by election.

No. 10 Rodney Street
Party	Candidate	Votes	%	±%
Conservative	Thomas Fleming	Unopposed	N/A	N/A
Registered electors				
Conservative hold				

=== No. 1, Everton, 15 November 1850 ===
Caused by the election of Councillor Edward Langsdale (Reformer, Everton, elected 1 November 1848) as an alderman by the council on 9 November 1850.

No. 1 Everton
Party	Candidate	Votes	%	±%
Conservative	Robert Aked			
Whig				
Majority				
Registered electors				
Turnout				
Conservative gain from Whig		Swing		

=== No. 3, Vauxhall, 15 November 1850 ===
Caused by the election of Councillor William Preston (Reformer, Vauxhall, elected 1 November 1850) as an alderman by the council on 9 November 1850.

No. 3 Vauxhall
Party	Candidate	Votes	%	±%
	William Nicholson			
Majority				
Registered electors				
Turnout				
	gain from	Swing		

=== No. 8, Pitt Street, 15 November 1850 ===
Caused by the election of Councillor Thomas Robinson (Conservative, Pitt Street, elected 1 November 1848) as an alderman by the council on 9 November 1850.

No. 8 Pitt Street
Party	Candidate	Votes	%	±%
	John Gladstone jun.			
Majority				
Registered electors				
Turnout				
	gain from	Swing		

=== No. 13, St. Anne Street, 15 November 1850 ===
Caused by the election of Cllr. William Bennett (Conservative, St. Anne Street, elected 1 November 1849) as an alderman by the council on 9 November 1849.

No. 13 St. Anne Street
Party	Candidate	Votes	%	±%
Whig	William Kenney Tyrer			
Conservative				
Majority				
Registered electors				
Turnout				
Whig gain from Conservative		Swing		

=== No. 7, St. Peter's, 4 August 1851 ===
Caused by the death of Councillor John Ferguson (Conservative, elected 1 November 1848).

No. 7 St. Peter's
Party	Candidate	Votes	%	±%
	Thomas Clarke			
Majority				
Registered electors				
Turnout				
	gain from	Swing		

== See also ==
- Liverpool Town Council elections 1835 – 1879
- Liverpool City Council elections 1880–present
- Mayors and Lord Mayors of Liverpool 1207 to present
- History of local government in England
