= St. Anne Street (Liverpool ward) =

Former electoral ward in Liverpool, England

St. Anne Street was one of the original sixteen wards established as a result of the Municipal Corporations Act 1835.

The ward ceased to exist in 1952

== St. Anne's Street ward Boundary 1835–1894 ==
"All such portions of the said borough as are included within a line drawn from the point at which Shaw's-brow meets Byrom-street, northwards along the centre of Byrom-street, to the point where the same joins Scotland-place, thence along the centre of Scotland-place, to the point at which the same joins Scotland-road, thence along the centre of Scotland-road, to the point at which the same is met by Rose-place, thence eastward along the centre of Rose-place, to the point at which the same meets the boundary line of the township of Everton, thence south-ward along the boundary of the Lime-street Ward, to the point first described."

== Councillors 1835–1952 ==
| Year | Party | Councillor elected |
|---|---|---|
| 1835 | Reformer | Richard Alison |
| | Reformer | Thomas Coglan |
| | Reformer | Edward Cropper |
| 1836 | Reformer | Joseph Mason |
| 1837 | Reformer | Edward Segar |
| 1838 | Reformer | Thomas Coglan |
| 1839 | Conservative | Robert Jones jun. |
| 1840 | Reformer | William Slater |
| 1841 | Conservative | James Parker |
| 1842 | Conservative | Robert Jones jun. |
| 1843 | Reformer | Joseph Hornby |
| 1844 | Conservative | James Parker |
| 1845 | Reformer | William Earle |
| 1846 | Conservative | William Bennett |
| 1847 | Conservative | James Parker |
| 1848 | Conservative | Thomas Poole |
| 1849 | Conservative | William Bennett - elected Alderman 9 Nov 1850 |
| 1850 | | John Nicholson |
| 15 Nov 1850 | Reformer | William Kenney Tyrer |
| 1851 | | Raymond William Houghton |
| 1852 | Reformer | Thomas Llewelyn Hodson |
| 1853 | | John Nicholson |
| 1854 | Reformer | Joseph Kitchen |
| 1855 | Reformer | Thomas Llewelyn Hodson |
| 1856 | Reformer | James Mellor |
| 1857 | Reformer | Joseph Kitchen |
| 1858 | Reformer | Thomas Llewelyn Hodson |
| 1859 | Conservative | George Nickson |
| 1860 | Liberal | Joseph Kitchen |
| 1861 | Liberal | William Bottomley Bairstow |
| 1862 | Conservative | George Nickson |
| 1863 | Liberal | Joseph Kitchen |
| 1864 | Conservative | Dr. John Stopford Taylor |
| 1865 | Conservative | Joseph Bennion= |
| 1866 | Conservative | Arthur P. Fletcher |
| 1867 | Conservative | Dr. John Stopford Taylor |
| 1868 | Conservative | James Denton |
| 1869 | Conservative | James Tarbuck |
| 1870 | Conservative | Dr. John Stopford Taylor |
| 1871 | Conservative | James Denton |
| 1872 | Conservative | James Tarbuck |
| 1873 | Conservative | Dr. John Stopford Taylor |
| 1874 | Conservative | Dr. William Cross |
| 1875 | Liberal | Ronald McDougall |
| 1876 | Conservative | George Fowler |
| 1877 | Conservative | Dr. William Cross |
| 1878 | Conservative | Thomas Hayes Sheen |
| 1879 | Liberal | Henry Vaughan |
| 1880 | Conservative | Dr. William Cross |
| 1881 | Conservative | Thomas Hayes Sheen |
| 1882 | Conservative | Joseph Woodcock |
| 1883 | Conservative | William Cross M.D. |
| 1884 | Conservative | Thomas Hayes Sheen |
| 1885 | Conservative | Joseph Woodcock |
| 1886 | Conservative | Dr. William Cross |
| 1887 | Conservative | William Clarkson |
| 1888 | Liberal | Samuel McMillin |
| 1889 | Conservative | Arthur John Jones Bamford |
| 1890 | Conservative | Jacob Reuben Grant |
| 1891 | Liberal | Samuel McMillin |
| 1892 | Liberal | Eli Brooks |
| 1893 | Liberal | Jacob Reuben Grant |
| 1894 | Liberal | Samuel McMillin |
| 1895 | Liberal | Jeremiah Miles |
| 1895 | Liberal | Jacob Reuben Grant |
| 1895 | Conservative | Richard Ripley |
| 1896 | Liberal | George King |
| 1897 | Liberal | Jacob Reuben Grant |
| 1898 | Liberal | James Crean |
| 1899 | Conservative | Frederick Saunby |
| 1900 | Liberal | George King |
| 1901 | Conservative | Isaac Caton Glover |
| 1902 | Conservative | Julius Jacobs |
| 1903 | Liberal | George King |
| 1904 | Conservative | Isaac Caton Glover |
| 1905 | Labour | James Sexton |
| 1906 | Liberal | George King |
| 1907 | Liberal | Dr. James Clement Baxter |
| 1908 | Labour | James Sexton |
| 1909 | Liberal | George King |
| 1910 | Liberal | Dr. James Clement Baxter |
| 1911 | Labour | James Sexton |
| 1912 | Liberal | Philip Durning Holt |
| 1913 | Liberal | Dr. James Clement Baxter |
| 1914 | | |
| 1919 | Liberal | Philip Durning Holt |
| 1920 | Irish Nationalist | Patrick Alfred Durkin |
| 1921 | Labour | James Sexton |
| 1922 | Independent Labour | John Nield |
| 1923 | Irish Nationalist | Patrick Alfred Durkin |
| 1924 | Labour | James Sexton MP |
| 1925 | Catholic Party | James Farrell Jnr. |
| 1926 | Labour | Maurice Eschwege |
| 1927 | Labour | James Sexton C.B.E. MP |
| 1928 | Labour | John David Mack |
| 1929 | Labour | Maurice Eschwege |
| 1930 | Labour | Mrs.Elizabeth Margaret Braddock |
| 1931 | Labour | John David Mack |
| 1932 | Labour | Samuel Sydney Silverman |
| 1933 | Labour | Mrs.Elizabeth Margaret Braddock |
| 1934 | Labour | John David Mack |
| 1935 | Labour | Samuel Sydney Silverman |
| 1936 | Labour | Mrs.Elizabeth Margaret Braddock MP |
| 1937 | Labour | John David Mack |
| 1938 | | Harry Livermore |
| 1945 | Labour | Mrs.Elizabeth Margaret Braddock |
| 1945 | Labour | Abraham Louis Caplan |
| 1946 | Labour | Mrs Sarah Anne McArd |
| 1947 | Labour | Abraham Louis Caplan |
| 1949 | Labour | Mrs.Elizabeth Margaret Braddock |
| 1950 | Labour | Mrs Sarah Anne McArd |
| 1951 | Labour | Abraham Louis Caplan |
| 1952 | Labour | Mrs.Elizabeth Margaret Braddock |

== See also ==
- Liverpool City Council
- Liverpool Town Council elections 1835–1879
- Liverpool City Council elections 1880–present
- List of electoral wards in Merseyside
- Mayors and Lord Mayors of Liverpool 1207 to present
- West Derby Hundred
- History of local government in England
- Timeline of Liverpool
