= 1877 Liverpool Town Council election =

English local election

- 1 November 1877

16 seats were up for election: one seat for each of the 16 wards 33 (incl. Aldermen) seats needed for a majority

Elections to Liverpool Town Council were held on Thursday 1 November 1877. One third of the council seats were up for election, the term of office of each councillor being three years.

Six of the sixteen wards were uncontested.

After the election, the composition of the council was:

| Party | Councillors | ± | Aldermen | Total |
|---|---|---|---|---|
| Conservative | ?? | ?? | 16 | ?? |
| Liberal | ?? | ?? | 0 | ?? |
| Irish Home Rule | 4 | +1 | 0 | 4 |

== Election result ==
Liverpool local election result 1879
| Party | Seats | Gains | Losses | Net gain/loss | Seats % | Votes % | Votes | +/− |
|---|---|---|---|---|---|---|---|---|
| Conservative | 9 | 1 | 4 | -3 | 56% | 49% | 9,103 | |
| Liberal | 6 | 4 | 2 | +2 | 44% | 51% | 9,354 | |
| Home Rule | 1 | 1 | 1 | +1 | | | | |

== Ward results ==
* - Retiring Councillor seeking re-election

=== Abercromby ===
No. 11 Abercromby
| Party | Candidate | Votes | % | ±% |
|---|---|---|---|---|
| Conservative | Dr. George Gill * | 974 | 56% | |
| Liberal | Thomas Shepherd Little | 770 | 44% | |
| Majority | | 204 | 12% | |
| Registered electors | | 2,572 | | |
| Turnout | | 1,744 | 68% | |
| Conservative hold | | Swing | | |

=== Castle Street ===
No. 6 Castle Street
| Party | Candidate | Votes | % | ±% |
|---|---|---|---|---|
| Conservative | Alexander Garnett | 634 | 54% | |
| Liberal | James Thornley | 539 | 46% | |
| Majority | | 95 | 8% | |
| Registered electors | | 1,763 | | |
| Turnout | | 1,173 | 67% | |
| Conservative hold | | Swing | | |

=== Everton ===
No. 1 Everton
| Party | Candidate | Votes | % | ±% |
|---|---|---|---|---|
| Conservative | Edward Whitley * | unopposed | | |
| Registered electors | | | | |
| Conservative hold | | Swing | | |

=== Exchange ===
No. 5 Exchange
| Party | Candidate | Votes | % | ±% |
|---|---|---|---|---|
| Liberal | Robert Durning Holt | 912 | 62% | |
| Conservative | Joseph Armstrong * | 549 | 38% | |
| Majority | | 363 | 24% | N/A |
| Registered electors | | 2,224 | | |
| Turnout | | 1,461 | 66% | |
| Liberal gain from Conservative | | Swing | | |

=== Great George ===
No. 9 Great George
| Party | Candidate | Votes | % | ±% |
|---|---|---|---|---|
| Liberal | John Hays Wilson | 547 | 60% | |
| Conservative | Dr. Robert Thomas Lodge * | 369 | 40% | |
| Majority | | 178 | 20% | N/A |
| Registered electors | | 1,299 | | |
| Turnout | | 916 | 71% | |
| Liberal gain from Conservative | | Swing | | |

=== Lime Street ===
No. 12 Lime Street
| Party | Candidate | Votes | % | ±% |
|---|---|---|---|---|
| Conservative | James Alexander Forrest * | 685 | 53% | |
| Liberal | Charles James Crosfield | 607 | 47% | |
| Majority | | 78 | 6% | |
| Registered electors | | 1,749 | | |
| Turnout | | 1,292 | 74% | |
| Conservative hold | | Swing | | |

=== North Toxteth ===
No. 16 North Toxteth
| Party | Candidate | Votes | % | ±% |
|---|---|---|---|---|
| Conservative | Arthur Bower Forwood * | 2,253 | 58% | |
| Liberal | John Phillips | 1,630 | 42% | |
| Majority | | 623 | 16% | |
| Registered electors | | 6,368 | | |
| Turnout | | 3,883 | 61% | |
| Conservative hold | | Swing | | |

=== Pitt Street ===
No. 8 Pitt Street
| Party | Candidate | Votes | % | ±% |
|---|---|---|---|---|
| Liberal | Henry Charles Hawley | 424 | 52% | |
| Conservative | William Bower Forwood * | 385 | 48% | |
| Majority | | 39 | 4% | N/A |
| Registered electors | | 943 | | |
| Turnout | | 809 | 86% | |
| Liberal gain from Conservative | | Swing | | |

=== Rodney Street ===
No. 10 Rodney Street
| Party | Candidate | Votes | % | ±% |
|---|---|---|---|---|
| Conservative | David Radcliffe | 1,006 | 56% | |
| Liberal | Henry Sylvester Samuel | 780 | 44% | |
| Majority | | 226 | 12% | |
| Registered electors | | 2,543 | | |
| Turnout | | 1,786 | 70% | |
| Conservative hold | | Swing | | |

=== St. Anne Street ===
No. 13 St. Anne Street
| Party | Candidate | Votes | % | ±% |
|---|---|---|---|---|
| Conservative | Dr. William Cross | unopposed | | |
| Registered electors | | | | |
| Conservative hold | | Swing | | |

=== St. Paul's ===
No. 4 St. Paul's
| Party | Candidate | Votes | % | ±% |
|---|---|---|---|---|
| Liberal | William Williams | 648 | 52% | |
| Conservative | Robert Wheeler Preston * | 597 | 48% | |
| Majority | | 51 | 4% | N/A |
| Registered electors | | 1,749 | | |
| Turnout | | 1,245 | 71% | |
| Liberal gain from Conservative | | Swing | | |

=== St. Peter's ===
No. 7 St. Peter's
| Party | Candidate | Votes | % | ±% |
|---|---|---|---|---|
| Liberal | Edmund Knowles Muspratt | unopposed | | |
| Registered electors | | | | |
| Liberal hold | | Swing | | |

=== Scotland ===
No. 2 Scotland
| Party | Candidate | Votes | % | ±% |
|---|---|---|---|---|
| Liberal and Irish Home Rule | Patrick de Lacy Garton | 2,497 | 60% | |
| Conservative | Joseph Thomas | 1,651 | 40% | |
| Majority | | 846 | 20% | N/A |
| Registered electors | | 9,453 | | |
| Turnout | | 4,148 | 44% | |
| Liberal Party (UK) and Home Rule League gain from Liberal | | | | |

=== South Toxteth ===
No. 15 South Toxteth
| Party | Candidate | Votes | % | ±% |
|---|---|---|---|---|
| Conservative | Thomas Bland Royden * | unopposed | | |
| Registered electors | | | | |
| Conservative hold | | Swing | | |

=== Vauxhall ===
No. 3 Vauxhall
| Party | Candidate | Votes | % | ±% |
|---|---|---|---|---|
| Liberal | John Yates * | unopposed | | |
| Registered electors | | | | |
| Liberal hold | | Swing | | |

=== West Derby ===
No. 14 West Derby
| Party | Candidate | Votes | % | ±% |
|---|---|---|---|---|
| Conservative | William Samuel Graves | unopposed | | |
| Registered electors | | | | |
| Conservative gain from Liberal | | Swing | | |

== Aldermanic Election ==
At the meeting of the Council on 9 November 1877, the terms of office of eight alderman expired. The following eight were elected as Aldermen by the Council (Aldermen and Councillors) on 9 November 1877 for a term of six years.

* - re-elected aldermen.

| Party | Alderman |
|---|---|
| Conservative | Andrew Boyd * |
| Conservative | William Bower Forwood |
| Conservative | Richard Cardwell Gardner * |
| Conservative | Bernard Hall * |
| Conservative | Joseph Harrison * |
| Conservative | Edward Samuelson * |
| Conservative | John Weightman * |
| Conservative | John Woodruff * |

== By-elections ==
=== No. 1, Everton, 2 March 1878 ===
The death of Alderman Joseph Harrison was reported to the Council on 16 February 1878.

His place was taken by Councillor John Pearson (Conservative, Everton, elected 1 November 1875) was elected as an Alderman by the Council on 16 February 1878.

No. 1 Everton
| Party | Candidate | Votes | % | ±% |
|---|---|---|---|---|
| Conservative | James Barkeley Smith | 7,752 | 61% | |
| Liberal | William Oulton | 4,913 | 39% | |
| Majority | | 2,839 | 22% | |
| Registered electors | | | | |
| Turnout | | 12,665 | | |
| Conservative hold | | Swing | | |

=== No. 16, North Toxteth, 23 May 1878 ===
Caused by the death of Councillor William Leyland (Conservative, North Toxteth, elected 1 November 1876), which was reported to the Council on 5 June 1878.

No. 16 North Toxteth
| Party | Candidate | Votes | % | ±% |
|---|---|---|---|---|
| Conservative | Thomas Hughes | 1,753 | 55% | |
| Liberal | Ewing Whittle | 1,411 | 45% | |
| Majority | | 342 | 10% | |
| Registered electors | | 6,368 | | |
| Turnout | | 3,164 | 50% | |
| Conservative hold | | Swing | | |

=== No. 8, Pitt Street, 23 May 1878 ===
Caused by the election of Charles Courtenay Deane (Conservative, Pitt Street, elected 23 April 1877) being declared void on 27 June 1877 under the Corrupt Practices (Municipal Elections) Act 1872 and reported to the Council on 4 July 1877.

No. 8 Pitt Street
| Party | Candidate | Votes | % | ±% |
|---|---|---|---|---|
| Liberal | James Steel | 359 | 54% | |
| Conservative | Charles Courtenay Deane | 306 | 46% | |
| Majority | | 53 | 8% | N/A |
| Registered electors | | 943 | | |
| Turnout | | 665 | 71% | |
| Liberal gain from Conservative | | Swing | | |

== See also ==
- Liverpool City Council
- Liverpool Town Council elections 1835 - 1879
- Liverpool City Council elections 1880–present
- Mayors and Lord Mayors of Liverpool 1207 to present
- History of local government in England
