= 1875 Liverpool Town Council election =

English local election

- 1 November 1875

16 seats were up for election: one seat for each of the 16 wards 33 (incl. Aldermen) seats needed for a majority

Elections to Liverpool Town Council were held on Monday 1 November 1875. One third of the council seats were up for election, the term of office of each councillor being three years. Eleven of the sixteen wards were uncontested.

After the election, the composition of the council was:

Party	Councillors	±	Aldermen	Total
Conservative	28	??	16	44
Liberal	18	??	0	18
Irish Home Rule	1	+1	0	1

== Election result ==
Liverpool local election result 1875
Party	Seats	Gains	Losses	Net gain/loss	Seats %	Votes %	Votes	+/−
Conservative	8	0	2	-2	50%	29%	3,039	
Liberal	7	2	1	+1	43%	45%	4,770	
Home Rule	1	1	0	+1	7%	26%	2,815	

Because of the large number of uncontested seats, these statistics should be taken in that context.

== Ward results ==
* - Retiring Councillor seeking re-election

=== Abercromby ===
No. 11 Abercromby
Party	Candidate	Votes	%	±%
Conservative	Anthony Bower *	Unopposed	N/A	N/A
Registered electors				
Conservative hold				

=== Castle Street ===
No. 6 Castle Street
Party	Candidate	Votes	%	±%
Liberal	William Crosfield	Unopposed	N/A	N/A
Registered electors				
Liberal hold				

=== Everton ===
No. 1 Everton
Party	Candidate	Votes	%	±%
Conservative	John Pearson *	Unopposed	N/A	N/A
Registered electors				
Conservative hold				

=== Exchange ===
No. 5 Exchange
Party	Candidate	Votes	%	±%
Liberal	Thomas Holder *	Unopposed	N/A	N/A
Registered electors				
Liberal hold				

=== Great George ===
No. 9 Great George
Party	Candidate	Votes	%	±%
Conservative	John Hughes *	Unopposed	N/A	N/A
Registered electors				
Conservative hold				

=== Lime Street ===
No. 12 Lime Street
Party	Candidate	Votes	%	±%
Conservative	Richard Rowland Minton *	764	60%	
Liberal	Samuel Bennett Jackson	520	40%	
Majority		244	20%	
Registered electors		2,004		
Turnout		1,284	64%	
Conservative hold		Swing		

=== North Toxteth ===
No. 16 North Toxteth
Party	Candidate	Votes	%	±%
Conservative	Richard Fell Steble *	Unopposed	N/A	N/A
Registered electors				
Conservative hold				

=== Pitt Street ===
No. 8 Pitt Street
Party	Candidate	Votes	%	±%
Conservative	Henry Jennings *	383	51%	
Liberal	Edward Browne	373	49%	
Majority		10	2%	
Registered electors		1,027		
Turnout		756	74%	
Conservative hold		Swing		

=== Rodney Street ===
No. 10 Rodney Street
Party	Candidate	Votes	%	±%
Liberal	Thomas Brocklebank jun	978	52%	
Conservative	Andrew Boyd	919	48%	
Majority		59	4%	N/A
Registered electors		2,741		
Turnout		1,897	69%	
Liberal gain from Conservative		Swing		

=== St. Anne Street ===
No. 13 St. Anne Street
Party	Candidate	Votes	%	±%
Liberal	Ronald McDougall	1,012	51%	
Conservative	James Tarbuck *	973	49%	
Majority		39	2%	N/A
Registered electors		3,070		
Turnout		1,985	65%	
Liberal gain from Conservative		Swing		

=== St. Paul's ===
No. 4 St. Paul's
Party	Candidate	Votes	%	±%
Conservative	Owen Hugh Williams *	Unopposed	N/A	N/A
Registered electors				
Conservative hold				

=== St. Peter's ===
No. 7 St. Peter's
Party	Candidate	Votes	%	±%
Liberal	Charles. Tricks Bowring *	Unopposed	N/A	N/A
Registered electors				
Liberal hold				

=== Scotland ===
No. 2 Scotland
Party	Candidate	Votes	%	±%
Home Rule	Laurence Connolly	2,815	60%	New
Liberal	William Williams *	1,887	40%	
Majority		928	20%	N/A
Registered electors		9,622		
Turnout		4,702	49%	
Home Rule gain from Liberal		Swing		

=== South Toxteth ===
No. 15 South Toxteth
Party	Candidate	Votes	%	±%
Conservative	Richard Allison Watson *	Unopposed	N/A	N/A
Registered electors				
Conservative hold				

=== Vauxhall ===
No. 3 Vauxhall
Party	Candidate	Votes	%	±%
Liberal	James Whitty *	Unopposed	N/A	N/A
Registered electors				
Liberal hold				

=== West Derby ===
No. 14 West Derby
Party	Candidate	Votes	%	±%
Liberal	William Durning Holt *	Unopposed	N/A	N/A
Registered electors				
Liberal hold				

== By-elections ==
=== No. 16, North Toxteth, 6 November 1875 ===
Caused by the death of Alderman Charles Turner MP which was reported to the Council on 25 October 1875. This position was filled by the election of Councillor Joseph Harrison (Conservative, North Toxteth, elected 1 November 1873) as an alderman.

No. 16 North Toxteth
Party	Candidate	Votes	%	±%
Conservative	William Leyland	Unopposed	N/A	N/A
Registered electors				
Conservative hold				

=== Aldermanic Election, 22 May 1876 ===
The death of the Mayor, Alderman Peter Thompson was reported to the Council on 22 May 1876.

Former Councillor Andrew Boyd (Conservative, Rodney Street, last elected 24 September 1875 to 1 November 1875) was elected as an alderman by the Council (Councillors and Aldermen) on 22 May 1876.

=== No. 14, West Derby, 3 August 1876 ===
Caused by the resignation of Alderman John Stopford Taylor.

Councillor Edward Samuelson (Conservative, West Derby, elected 1 November 1874) was elected as an alderman by the Council (Councillors and Aldermen) on 19 July 1876.

No. 14 West Derby
Party	Candidate	Votes	%	±%
Conservative	John Nicol	Unopposed	N/A	N/A
Registered electors				
Conservative hold				

=== No. 3, Vauxhall, 6 September 1876 ===
Caused by the death of Councillor James Whitty which was reported to the Council on 4 October 1876.

No. 3 Vauxhall
Party	Candidate	Votes	%	±%
	Charles McArdle	unopposed		
Registered electors				
		Swing		

== See also ==
- Liverpool City Council
- Liverpool Town Council elections 1835 - 1879
- Liverpool City Council elections 1880–present
- Mayors and Lord Mayors of Liverpool 1207 to present
- History of local government in England
