= Home Rule League =

- The Irish harp, along with the coat of arms of the provinces of Ireland, played a prominent role in Home Rule League literature.
- Founded: 1873; 153 years ago
- Dissolved: 1882; 144 years ago
- Preceded by: Home Government Association
- Succeeded by: Irish Parliamentary Party
- Ideology: Irish nationalism; Liberalism
- Political position: Centre to centre-left
- Colours: Green

The Home Rule League (1873–1882), sometimes called the Home Rule Party, was an Irish political party which campaigned for home rule for Ireland within the United Kingdom of Great Britain and Ireland, until it was replaced by the Irish Parliamentary Party. The Home Rule Confederation of Great Britain was a sister organisation in Great Britain.

== Origins ==
Following the failure of the Fenian Rising of 1867 less revolutionary tactics were considered. The Home Rule League grew out of the Home Government Association, a pressure group formed in 1870 and led by Isaac Butt, a Dublin-based barrister who had once been a leading Irish Tory before becoming a convert to Irish nationalism. On 18–21 November 1873, the loose association re-constituted itself as a full political party, the Home Rule League, and in the 1874 general election, many of whom were from an Irish aristocratic or gentry Church of Ireland background, some newly dedicated former Irish Liberal Party members, such as Sir John Gray MP, and other more radical members who gathered around County Cavan MP Joseph Biggar and County Meath MP Charles Stewart Parnell. This radical wing of the party launched parliamentary filibusters to obstruct the passage of Parliamentary business, to the embarrassment of Butt and frustration of successive British governments.

== Changes under Parnell ==
On 28 August 1877 Parnell was elected leader of the Home Rule Confederation of Great Britain in place of Butt. In January 1878, Butt retained control of the Home Rule League in Ireland, which had a more middle-class and less Fenian membership and structure. The division affected the disciple of the parliamentary party at Westminster.

Following Butt's death in 1879, William Shaw served as chairman (leader) for one parliamentary session. In 1880, Parnell was elected chairman of the party, and in the 1880 general election, the party increased its number of seats. In 1882, as part of a wholesale move from being an informal alliance to a cohesive unified, political movement Parnell renamed it the Irish Parliamentary Party to pursue Irish Home Rule. The party under Parnell, himself a Protestant, became more radical, middle class, and Catholic. It largely, though not completely, squeezed out other political rivals, notably the Irish Liberal Party and the Irish Conservative Party.

== Chairmen (leaders) of the Party, 1873–1882 ==
- Isaac Butt 1873–1879.
- William Shaw 1879–1880.
- Charles Stewart Parnell 1880–1882.

== See also ==
- Independent Irish Party
