= Castle Street (Liverpool ward) =

Ward in Liverpool

Coordinates: 53.4050°N 2.9900°W

Castle Street Ward
- Defunct Ward
- Location within Merseyside
- OS grid reference: SJ340900
  - London: 179 mi (288 km) South
- Metropolitan borough: Liverpool City Council
- Metropolitan county: Merseyside
- Region: North West
- Country: England
- Sovereign state: United Kingdom
- Post town: Liverpool
- Postcode district: L2
- Dialling code: 0151
- Police: Merseyside
- Fire: Merseyside
- Ambulance: North West
- UK Parliament: Liverpool Riverside

Castle Street is a defunct electoral ward in Liverpool, in Merseyside, England, and part of the Liverpool Riverside parliamentary. Castle street was bordered to the north by the Exchange ward, to the south by the Port of Liverpool, the Lord Street and Church Street to the east and River Mersey to the west. Historically, it was part of Lancashire before the establishment of Merseyside.

== History ==
Castle Street ward covered the area around Castle Street, one of Liverpool's original seven streets, in Liverpool's central business district. It connected Liverpool's town hall with the waterfront. It was primarily a commercial area, and had a commercial and business population.

== Ward elections ==
=== 1914 ===
No. 15 Castle Street
Party	Candidate	Votes	%	±%
Liberal	Richard George Hough *	unopposed		
Registered electors				
Liberal hold		Swing		

=== 1919 ===
No. 7 Castle Street
Party	Candidate	Votes	%	±%
Conservative	Frank Ambrose Goodwin	unopposed		
Registered electors				
Conservative hold		Swing		

=== 1920 ===
No. 7 Castle Street
Party	Candidate	Votes	%	±%
Conservative	Benjamin Cookson	unopposed		
Registered electors				
Conservative hold		Swing		

=== 1921 ===
No. 7 Castle Street
Party	Candidate	Votes	%	±%
Liberal	Richard George Hough	unopposed		
Registered electors				
Liberal hold		Swing		

=== 1922 ===
No. 7 Castle Street
Party	Candidate	Votes	%	±%
Conservative	John Sandeman Allen	Unopposed	N/A	N/A
Registered electors				
Conservative hold				

=== 1923 ===
No. 7 Castle Street
Party	Candidate	Votes	%	±%
Conservative	Frederick William Frodsham	793	65%	
Liberal	Thomas Royal Little	418	35%	
Majority		375		
Registered electors		2,668		
Turnout		1,211	45%	
Conservative hold		Swing		

=== 1924 ===
No. 7 Castle Street
Party	Candidate	Votes	%	±%
Conservative	William Denton	unopposed		
Registered electors				
Conservative gain from Liberal		Swing		

=== 1925 ===
No. 7 Castle Street
Party	Candidate	Votes	%	±%
Conservative	John Sandeman Allen MP *	Unopposed	N/A	N/A
Registered electors		2,586		
Conservative hold				

=== 1926 ===
No. 7 Castle Street
Party	Candidate	Votes	%	±%
	Richard Rutherford	unopposed		
Registered electors		12,593		
		Swing		

=== 1927 ===
No. 7 Castle Street
Party	Candidate	Votes	%	±%
Conservative	William Denton *	unopposed		
Registered electors				
Conservative hold		Swing		

=== 1928 ===
No. 7 Castle Street
Party	Candidate	Votes	%	±%
Conservative	Sir John Sandeman Allen MP *	Unopposed	N/A	N/A
Registered electors				
Conservative hold				

=== 1929 ===
No. 7 Castle Street
Party	Candidate	Votes	%	±%
Conservative	Robert Garnett Sheldon *	unopposed		
Registered electors				
Conservative hold		Swing		

=== 1930 ===
No. 7 Castle Street
Party	Candidate	Votes	%	±%
Conservative	William Denton *	unopposed		
Registered electors				
Conservative hold		Swing		

=== 1931 ===
No. 7 Castle Street
Party	Candidate	Votes	%	±%
Conservative	Alfred Ernest Shennan	unopposed		
Registered electors				
Conservative hold		Swing		

=== 1932 ===
No. 7 Castle Street
Party	Candidate	Votes	%	±%
Conservative	Robert Garnett Sheldon *	unopposed		
Registered electors				
Conservative hold		Swing		

=== 1933 ===
No. 7 Castle Street
Party	Candidate	Votes	%	±%
Liberal	William Denton	unopposed		
Registered electors				
Liberal hold		Swing		

=== 1934 ===
No. 7 Castle Street
Party	Candidate	Votes	%	±%
Conservative	Herbert Neville Bewley	565	66%	
Ind. Conservative	William Edward MacLachlan	295	34%	
Majority		270		
Registered electors		2,203		
Turnout		860	39%	
Conservative hold		Swing		

=== 1935 ===
No. 7 Castle Street
Party	Candidate	Votes	%	±%
Conservative	James Bennett O.B.E.	unopposed		
Registered electors				
Conservative hold		Swing		

=== 1936 ===
No. 7 Castle Street
Party	Candidate	Votes	%	±%
Liberal	William Sinclair Scott Hannay	unopposed		
Registered electors				
Liberal hold		Swing		

=== 1937 ===
No. 7 Castle Street
Party	Candidate	Votes	%	±%
Conservative	Herbert Neville Bewley *	unopposed		
Registered electors				
Conservative hold		Swing		

=== 1938 ===
No. 7 Castle Street
Party	Candidate	Votes	%	±%
Conservative	James Bennett O.B.E. *	unopposed		
Registered electors				
Conservative hold		Swing		

=== 1945 ===
Castle Street
Party	Candidate	Votes	%	±%
Liberal	William S.S. Hannay	525	96%	
Labour	A. Kay	24	4%	
Majority		501		
Registered electors		910		
Turnout		549	60%	

=== 1946 ===
Castle Street
Party	Candidate	Votes	%	±%
Conservative	Herbert Neville Bewley	unopposed		
Registered electors		892		

=== 1947 ===
Castle Street
Party	Candidate	Votes	%	±%
Conservative	James Bennett	unopposed		

=== 1949 ===
Castle Street
Party	Candidate	Votes	%	±%
Conservative	William Sinclair Scott ^{(PARTY)}	unopposed		
Conservative gain from Liberal		Swing		

=== 1950 ===
Castle Street
Party	Candidate	Votes	%	±%
Conservative	Thomas Winlack Harley ^{(PARTY)}	559	98%	
Labour	Harry Livermore	9	2%	
Majority		550		
Registered electors		860		
Turnout		568	66%	
Conservative hold		Swing		

=== 1951 ===
Castle Street
Party	Candidate	Votes	%	±%
Conservative	Reginald Poole ^{(PARTY)}	499	98%	
Labour	Thomas McNerney	11	2%	
Majority		488		
Registered electors		922		
Turnout		510	55%	
Conservative hold		Swing		

=== 1952 ===
Castle Street
Party	Candidate	Votes	%	±%
Labour	Thomas Henry Thompson	440	97%	
Independent	James Elias	13	3%	
Majority		427		
Registered electors		956		
Turnout		453	47%	
Labour gain from Conservative		Swing		
