= 1909 Liverpool City Council election =

Liverpool City Council elections 1909

← 1908	November 1, 1909	1910 →

34 seats were up for election (one third): one seat for each of the 34 wards 69 (incl. Aldermen) seats needed for a majority

Elections to Liverpool City Council were held on 1 November 1909.

After the election, the composition of the council was:

Party	Councillors	±	Aldermen	Total
Conservative	??	-2	??	86
Liberal	??	+1	??	34
Irish Nationalist	??	??	??	14
Labour	1	0	0	1
Independent	??	??	??	1
Protestant	2	+1	0	2

== Election result ==
Liverpool local election result 1909
Party	Seats	Gains	Losses	Net gain/loss	Seats %	Votes %	Votes	+/−
Conservative	20	0	2	-2		51%	9,908	
Liberal	8	1	0	+1		29%	5,661	
Irish Nationalist	5	0	0	0		0%	0	
Protestant	1	1	0	+1		5.4%	1,064	
Labour	0	0	0	0	0%	8%	1,558	
Socialist	0	0	0	0	0%	7%	1,362	
Independent	0	0	0	0	0%	0.17%	34	

== Ward results ==
* - Retiring Councillor seeking re-election

Comparisons are made with the 1906 election results, as the retiring councillors were elected in that year.

=== Abercromby ===
No. 21 Abercromby
Party	Candidate	Votes	%	±%
Conservative	Edward Lawrence *	882	56%	
Liberal	Philip Durning Holt	700	44%	
Majority		182		
Registered electors		2,369		
Turnout		1,582	67%	
Conservative hold		Swing		

=== Aigburth ===
No. 29 Aigburth
Party	Candidate	Votes	%	±%
Liberal	Albert Edward Jacob *	760	58%	
Conservative	David Jackson	542	42%	
Majority		218		
Registered electors		1,691		
Turnout		1,302	77%	
Liberal hold		Swing		

=== Anfield ===
No. 3 Anfield
Party	Candidate	Votes	%	±%
Liberal	Henry Jones *	unopposed		
Registered electors				
Liberal hold		Swing		

=== Breckfield ===
No. 6 Breckfield
Party	Candidate	Votes	%	±%
Conservative	William Herbert Priest *	unopposed		
Registered electors				
Conservative hold		Swing		

=== Brunswick ===
No. 25 Brunswick
Party	Candidate	Votes	%	±%
Irish Nationalist	John Alfred Kelly *	unopposed		
Registered electors				
Irish Nationalist hold		Swing		

=== Castle Street ===
No. 18 Castle Street
Party	Candidate	Votes	%	±%
Conservative	James Willcox Alsop *	unopposed		
Registered electors				
Conservative hold		Swing		

=== Dingle ===
No. 26 Dingle
Party	Candidate	Votes	%	±%
Conservative	Owen Harrison Williams *	unopposed		
Registered electors				
Conservative hold		Swing		

=== Edge Hill ===
No. 12 Edge Hill
Party	Candidate	Votes	%	±%
Conservative	Reginald Jaeger Clarke	unopposed		
Registered electors				
Conservative hold		Swing		

=== Everton ===
No. 9 Everton
Party	Candidate	Votes	%	±%
Conservative	Richard Rutherford	unopposed		
Registered electors				
Conservative hold		Swing		

=== Exchange ===
No. 16 Exchange
Party	Candidate	Votes	%	±%
Conservative	John Sutherland Harmood-Banner *	683	55%	
Liberal	Alfred Gates	549	45%	
Majority		134		
Registered electors		1,705		
Turnout		1,232	72%	
Conservative hold		Swing		

=== Fairfield ===
No. 4 Fairfield
Party	Candidate	Votes	%	±%
Liberal	Francis L'Estrange Joseph *	unopposed		
Registered electors				
Liberal hold		Swing		

=== Garston ===
No. 30 Garston
Party	Candidate	Votes	%	±%
Conservative	Joshua Burrow *	unopposed		
Registered electors				
Conservative hold		Swing		

=== Granby ===
No. 22 Granby
Party	Candidate	Votes	%	±%
Liberal	Joseph Harrison Jones *	962	66%	
Socialist	Francis J. Welland	497	34%	
Majority		1,459		
Registered electors		3,600		
Turnout		1,459	41%	
Liberal hold		Swing		

=== Great George ===
No. 20 Great George
Party	Candidate	Votes	%	±%
Conservative	William Muirhead *	unopposed		
Registered electors				
Conservative hold		Swing		

=== Kensington ===
No. 11 Kensington
Party	Candidate	Votes	%	±%
Conservative	Robert Lowry Burns *	1,434	62%	
Socialist	John Wolfe Tone Morrissey	865	38%	
Majority		569		
Registered electors		4,606		
Turnout		2,299	50%	
Conservative hold		Swing		

=== Kirkdale ===
No. 2 Kirkdale
Party	Candidate	Votes	%	±%
Conservative	Theodore Lowey *	1,937	67%	
Labour	William White	967	33%	
Majority		970		
Registered electors		6,236		
Turnout		2,904	47%	
Conservative hold		Swing		

=== Low Hill ===
No. 10 Low Hill
Party	Candidate	Votes	%	±%
Conservative	Anthony Shelerdine *	1,039	64%	
Labour	Griffith J. Jones	591	36%	
Majority		448		
Registered electors		3,803		
Turnout		1,630	43%	
Conservative hold		Swing		

=== Netherfield ===
No. 8 Netherfield
Party	Candidate	Votes	%	±%
Protestant	John Walker	1,064	56%	
Conservative	Charles Henry Rutherford *	831	44%	
Majority		233		
Registered electors		3,711		
Turnout		1,895	51%	
Protestant gain from Conservative		Swing		

=== North Scotland ===
No. 13 North Scotland
Party	Candidate	Votes	%	±%
Irish Nationalist	Dr. Joseph Maguire	unopposed		
Registered electors				
Irish Nationalist hold		Swing		

=== Old Swan ===
No. 28A Old Swan
Party	Candidate	Votes	%	±%
Conservative	James Wilson Walker *	unopposed		
Registered electors				
Conservative hold		Swing		

=== Prince's Park ===
No. 23 Prince's Park
Party	Candidate	Votes	%	±%
Conservative	Harold Chaloner Dowdall *	unopposed		
Registered electors				
Conservative hold		Swing		

=== Sandhills ===
No. 1 Sandhills
Party	Candidate	Votes	%	±%
Irish Nationalist	Michael Edward Kearney *	unopposed		
Registered electors				
Irish Nationalist hold		Swing		

=== St. Anne's ===
No. 17 St. Anne's
Party	Candidate	Votes	%	±%
Liberal	George King *	209	86%	
Independent	George Gretton	34	14%	
Majority		175		
Registered electors				
Turnout		243		
Liberal hold		Swing		

=== St. Domingo ===
No. 23 St. Domingo
Party	Candidate	Votes	%	±%
Conservative	Joseph Roby *	unopposed		
Registered electors				
Conservative hold		Swing		

=== St. Peter's ===
No. 19 St. Peter's
Party	Candidate	Votes	%	±%
Liberal	Thomas Shaw	562	55%	
Conservative	Hugh Toner	456	45%	
Majority		106		
Registered electors		1,715		
Turnout		1,018	59%	
Liberal gain from Conservative		Swing		

=== Sefton Park East ===
No. 24A Sefton Park East
Party	Candidate	Votes	%	±%
Liberal	John Japp *	unopposed		
Registered electors				
Liberal hold		Swing		

=== Sefton Park West ===
No. 16 Sefton Park West
Party	Candidate	Votes	%	±%
Liberal	Herbert Reynolds Rathbone *	unopposed		
Registered electors				
Liberal hold		Swing		

=== South Scotland ===
No. 14 South Scotland
Party	Candidate	Votes	%	±%
Irish Nationalist	John O'Shea *	unopposed		
Registered electors				
Irish Nationalist hold		Swing		

=== Vauxhall ===
No. 15 Vauxhall
Party	Candidate	Votes	%	±%
Irish Nationalist	Thomas Burke *	unopposed		
Registered electors				
Irish Nationalist hold		Swing		

=== Walton ===
No. 3A Walton
Party	Candidate	Votes	%	±%
Conservative	Richard Pritchard *	unopposed		
Registered electors				
Conservative hold		Swing		

=== Warbreck ===
No. 27 Warbreck
Party	Candidate	Votes	%	±%
Conservative	Robert Charles Herman *	unopposed		
Registered electors				
Conservative hold		Swing		

=== Wavertree ===
No. 5 Wavertree
Party	Candidate	Votes	%	±%
Conservative	George Bowler	1,117	54%	
Liberal	Wilfrid B. Stoddart	959	46%	
Majority		158		
Registered electors		3,313		
Turnout		2,076	63%	
Conservative hold		Swing		

=== Wavertree West ===
No. 5A Wavertree West
Party	Candidate	Votes	%	±%
Conservative	Herbert Preston Reynolds *	987	51%	
Liberal	Cecil H. Brunner	960	49%	
Majority		27		
Registered electors		3,465		
Turnout		1,947	56%	
Conservative hold		Swing		

=== West Derby ===
No. 28 West Derby
Party	Candidate	Votes	%	±%
Conservative	William Henry Parkinson *	unopposed		
Registered electors				
Conservative hold		Swing		

== See also ==
- Liverpool City Council
- Liverpool Town Council elections 1835 - 1879
- Liverpool City Council elections 1880–present
- Mayors and Lord Mayors of Liverpool 1207 to present
- History of local government in England
