= 1900 Liverpool City Council election =

English local election

- 1 November 1900

34 seats, being 29 for existing wards plus the new wards of Anfield (1 seat), Walton (3 seats) and Warbreck (1 seat): one seat for each of the 32 wards with the exception of Walton, which was a new ward with 3 councillors to be elected. Making a new total of 92 Councillors. An additional aldermanic position was created for the new ward of Walton at the Council meeting on 9 November, but not for Anfield nor Warbreck. making a total of 30 Aldermanic posts. 62 (incl. Aldermen) seats needed for a majority

Elections to Liverpool City Council were held on Thursday 1 November 1900.

Following the creation of new wards: Anfield (1 seat), Walton (3 seats) and Warbreck (1 seat), there were a total of 32 wards with elections, each with one seat up for election, with the exception of Walton, which was a new ward with 3 councillors elected at this election.

There were 5 new seats at this election : Anfield (1 seat); Walton (3 seats) and Wavertree (1 seat). Of the 32 wards with elections 17 were contested and 15 uncontested. There were a total of 92 Councillors after the election on 1 November 1900. At the Council meeting on 9 November a new Alderman was elected for the new Walton ward, making a total of 30 Aldermen.

After the election, the composition of the council was:

Party	Councillors	±	Aldermen	Total
Conservative	56	+4	21	77
Liberal	23	+2	6	29
Irish Nationalist	6	-1	2	8
Independent Irish Nationalist	3	+1	0	3
Liberal Unionist	2	0	1	3

== Election result ==
Liverpool local election result 1900
Party	Seats	Gains	Losses	Net gain/loss	Seats %	Votes %	Votes	+/−
Conservative	22	7	3	+4	71%	47.6	13,849	
Liberal	6	4	2	+2	19%	35.7	10,371	
Irish Nationalist	2	0	1	-1	6%	11.7	3,415	
Independent Irish Nationalist	1	1	0	+1	3.2%	3.0	871	
Independent	0	0	0	0	0%	2.0	577	

== Ward results ==
* - Retiring Councillor seeking re-election

Comparisons are made with the 1897 election results, as the retiring councillors were elected in that year.

=== Abercromby ===
No. 21 Abercromby
Party	Candidate	Votes	%	±%
Conservative	Lorents Braun Haddock *	unopposed		
Registered electors				
Conservative hold		Swing		

=== Anfield ===
No. 3 Anfield
Party	Candidate	Votes	%	±%
Conservative	Robert Arwood Beaver	712	52%	
Liberal	Henry Jones	669	48%	
Majority		43		
Registered electors		2,108		
Turnout		1,381	66%	
Conservative win (new seat)				

=== Breckfield ===
No. 6 Breckfield
Party	Candidate	Votes	%	±%
Conservative	John Duncan	unopposed		
Registered electors				
Conservative hold		Swing		

=== Brunswick ===
No. 25 Brunswick
Party	Candidate	Votes	%	±%
Liberal	Dr. William Permewan	1,009	53%	
Conservative	Hartley Wilson *	884	47%	
Majority		125		
Registered electors		3,113		
Turnout		1,893	61%	
Liberal gain from Conservative		Swing		

=== Castle Street ===
No. 18 Castle Street
Party	Candidate	Votes	%	±%
Conservative	John Thomas Wood *	unopposed		
Registered electors				
Conservative hold		Swing		

=== Dingle ===
No. 26 Dingle
Party	Candidate	Votes	%	±%
Conservative	Alfred Stephen Collard	1,746	80%	
Liberal	David Jones	446	20%	
Majority		1,300		
Registered electors		5,312		
Turnout		2,192	41%	
Conservative hold		Swing		

=== Edge Hill ===
No. 12 Edge Hill
Party	Candidate	Votes	%	±%
Conservative	James Barclay Light *	Unopposed	N/A	N/A
Registered electors				
Conservative hold				

=== Everton ===
No. 9 Everton
Party	Candidate	Votes	%	±%
Conservative	Edward Lewis Lloyd *	unopposed		
Registered electors				
Conservative hold		Swing		

=== Exchange ===
No. 16 Exchange
Party	Candidate	Votes	%	±%
Conservative	John Sutherland Harmood-Banner *	559	86%	
Independent	Joseph Hughes	88	14%	
Majority		471		
Registered electors		1,780		
Turnout		647	36%	
Conservative hold		Swing		

=== Fairfield ===
No. 4 Fairfield
Party	Candidate	Votes	%	±%
Conservative	Thomas May Smith *	unopposed		
Registered electors				
Conservative hold		Swing		

=== Granby ===
No. 22 Granby
Party	Candidate	Votes	%	±%
Liberal	Joseph Harrison Jones	1,218	53%	
Conservative	Frederick John Miners	1,065	47%	
Majority		153		
Registered electors		4,000		
Turnout		2,263	57%	
Liberal gain from Conservative		Swing		

=== Great George ===
No. 20 Great George
Party	Candidate	Votes	%	±%
Conservative	William Muirhead	721	53%	
Liberal	Thomas Dowdall	640	47%	
Majority		81		
Registered electors		2,054		
Turnout		1,361	66%	
Conservative gain from Liberal		Swing		

=== Kensington ===
No. 11 Kensington
Party	Candidate	Votes	%	±%
Conservative	Edward Burns	unopposed		
Registered electors				
Conservative hold		Swing		

=== Kirkdale ===
No. 2 Kirkdale
Party	Candidate	Votes	%	±%
Conservative	Edward Russell Taylor	unopposed		
Registered electors				
Conservative hold		Swing		

=== Low Hill ===
No. 10 Low Hill
Party	Candidate	Votes	%	±%
Conservative	David Alexander McNeight	unopposed		
Registered electors				
Conservative hold		Swing		

=== Netherfield ===
No. 8 Netherfield
Party	Candidate	Votes	%	±%
Conservative	Simon Jude *	unopposed		
Registered electors				
Conservative hold		Swing		

=== North Scotland ===
No. 13 North Scotland
Party	Candidate	Votes	%	±%
Irish Nationalist	James Daly *	1,050	85%	
Independent	James Flynn	190	15%	
Majority		860		
Registered electors		3,305		
Turnout		1,240	38%	
Irish Nationalist hold		Swing		

=== Prince's Park ===
No. 23 Prince's Park
Party	Candidate	Votes	%	±%
Conservative	Harold Chaloner Dowdall *	unopposed		
Registered electors				
Conservative hold		Swing		

=== Sandhills ===
No. 1 Sandhills
Party	Candidate	Votes	%	±%
Conservative	David Henry Grant	931	55%	
Irish Nationalist	Bernard Conlon	750	45%	
Majority		181		
Registered electors		4,383		
Turnout		1,681	48%	
Conservative gain from Liberal		Swing		

=== St. Anne's ===
No. 17 St. Anne's
Party	Candidate	Votes	%	±%
Liberal	George King *	1,038	50.2%	
Conservative	Alfred John Fishlock	1,029	49.8%	
Majority		9		
Registered electors		3,411		
Turnout		2,067	61%	
Liberal hold		Swing		

=== St. Domingo ===
No. 7 St. Domingo
Party	Candidate	Votes	%	±%
Conservative	Robert Alfred Hampson *	unopposed		
Registered electors				
Conservative hold		Swing		

=== St. Peter's ===
No. 19 St. Peter's
Party	Candidate	Votes	%	±%
Liberal	William Crossfield *	unopposed		
Registered electors				
Liberal hold		Swing		

=== Sefton Park East ===
No. 24A Sefton Park East
Party	Candidate	Votes	%	±%
Liberal	John Japp *	1,047	57%	
Conservative	Rupert Stanley Bremner	806	43%	
Majority		241		
Registered electors		3,170		
Turnout		1,853	58%	
Liberal hold		Swing		

=== Sefton Park West ===
No. 24 Sefton Park West
Party	Candidate	Votes	%	±%
Liberal	Herbert Reynolds Rathbone	666	60%	
Conservative	Radcliffe William Radcliffe-Smith	446	40%	
Majority		220		
Registered electors		1,843		
Turnout		1,112	60%	
Liberal win (new seat)				

=== South Scotland ===
No. 14 South Scotland
Party	Candidate	Votes	%	±%
Independent Irish Nationalist	John O'Shea	871	56%	
Irish Nationalist	Michael Heron	673	44%	
Majority		198		
Registered electors		3,472		
Turnout		1,544	44%	
Independent Irish Nationalist gain from Irish Nationalist				

=== Vauxhall ===
No. 15 Vauxhall
Party	Candidate	Votes	%	±%
Irish Nationalist	Thomas Burke	643	53%	
Conservative	Julius Jacobs	578	47%	
Majority		65		
Registered electors		2,090		
Turnout		1,221	58%	
Irish Nationalist hold		Swing		

=== Walton ===
No. 3A Walton - 3 seats
Party	Candidate	Votes	%	±%
Conservative	John Brunskill	1,218	49%	
Conservative	George Brodrick Smith-Brodrick *	1,180	47%	
Conservative	Jacob Reuben Grant	1,019	41%	
Liberal	Alfred Thomas Davies	993	40%	
Liberal	Alexander McLaren	800	32%	
Liberal	Robert Alfred Bellwood	702	28%	
Independent	William Henry Quilliam	299	12%	
Majority		225		
Registered electors		3,559		
Turnout		2,510	71%	
Conservative win (new seat)				
Conservative win (new seat)				
Conservative win (new seat)				

=== Warbreck ===
No. 27 Warbreck
Party	Candidate	Votes	%	±%
Conservative	John Harvey Farmer	unopposed		
Registered electors				
Conservative hold		Swing		

=== Wavertree ===
No. 5 Wavertree
Party	Candidate	Votes	%	±%
Conservative	Arthur Croathwaite *	unopposed		
Registered electors				
Conservative win (new seat)				

=== West Derby ===
No. 28 West Derby
Party	Candidate	Votes	%	±%
Liberal	William Ramsden	1,143	54%	
Conservative	George Layton	955	46%	
Majority		188		
Registered electors		3,259		
Turnout		2,098	64%	
Liberal gain from Conservative		Swing		

== Aldermanic election ==
On 9 November 1900, Councillor William Roberts (Conservative, Dingle, elected 1 November 1899) was elected by the Council (Councillors and Aldermen) as an Alderman and assigned to the newly created ward of Walton.

== By-elections ==
=== No. 21 Abercromby, 29 January 1901 ===
The resignation of Alderman Alexander Garnett (Conservative, elected as an alderman in 1883 1889 and 1895) was reported to the council on 5 December 1900.

Councillor Maxwell Hyslop Maxwell the younger (Conservative, Abercromby, elected 1 November 1898) was elected by the council as an alderman on 2 January 1901.

No. 21 Abercromby
Party	Candidate	Votes	%	±%
Conservative	William Phillips	538		
Independent	Edward Phillips	57		
Majority		481		
Registered electors		3,113		
Turnout		595		
Conservative hold		Swing		

=== No. 26 Dingle, 27 November 1900 ===
Caused by the election of Councillor William Roberts (Conservative, Dingle, elected 1 November 1899) was elected by the Council (Councillors and Aldermen) as an Alderman and assigned to the newly created ward of Walton.

No. 26 Dingle
Party	Candidate	Votes	%	±%
Conservative	Austin Taylor	unopposed		
Registered electors				
Conservative hold		Swing		

=== No. 11 Kensington, 28 February 1901 ===
The resignation of Alderman Sir Thomas Hughes (Conservative, elected as an alderman on 19 March 1891 and 9 November 1895) was reported to the council on 2 January 1901.

Councillor Dr. Thomas Clarke (Conservative, Kensington, elected 2 November 1898) was elected as an alderman by the council on 6 February 1901.

No. 11 Kensington
Party	Candidate	Votes	%	±%
Liberal Unionist	Samuel Mason Hutchinson	1,067		
Liberal	Alexander Armour	886		
Majority				
Registered electors		5,312		
Turnout				
Liberal Unionist hold		Swing		

=== No. 10 Low Hill, 28 February 1901 ===
The resignation of Councillor Charles Stewart Dean (Conservative, Low Hill, elected 1 November 1899) was reported to the Council on 6 February 1901.

No. 10 Low Hill
Party	Candidate	Votes	%	±%
Conservative	Joseph Quillam Roby	1,054		
Liberal	Samuel McMillin	800		
Majority		254		
Registered electors		5,312		
Turnout		1,854		
Conservative hold		Swing		

=== No. 20 Great George ===
The resignation of Councillor John Henderson (Great George, elected 25 November 1898) was reported to the council on 6 March 1901.

No. 20 Great George
Party	Candidate	Votes	%	±%
Conservative	William Muirhead			
Majority				
Registered electors				
Turnout				
Conservative gain from		Swing		

=== No. 3 Anfield, 10 May 1901 ===
Caused by the death of Councillor Robert Atwood Beaver (Conservative, Anfield, elected 1 November 1900) on 12 April 1901.

No. 20 Anfield
Party	Candidate	Votes	%	±%
Conservative	John Valentine Smith	unopposed		
Registered electors				
Conservative hold		Swing		

== See also ==
- Liverpool City Council
- Liverpool Town Council elections 1835–1879
- Liverpool City Council elections 1880–present
- Mayors and Lord Mayors of Liverpool 1207–present
- History of local government in England
