= 1938 Liverpool City Council election =

1938 UK local election

← 1937	1 November 1938	1945 →

Elections to Liverpool City Council were held on 1 November 1938. One third of the council seats were up for election, the term of office of each councillor being three years.

Twelve of the forty seats up for election were uncontested.

After the election, the composition of the council was:

Party	Councillors	±	Aldermen	Total
Conservative	73	??	23	96
Labour	31	??	8	39
Liberal	6	??	4	10
Protestant	3	??	1	4
Independent	5	??	3	8

== Election result ==
Liverpool local election result 1938
Party	Seats	Gains	Losses	Net gain/loss	Seats %	Votes %	Votes	+/−
Conservative	25					58%	65,689	
Labour	6					36%	40,957	
Protestant	1					2.5%	2,828	
Liberal	2					2.3%	2,828	
Independent	1					1.3%	1,455	

== Ward results ==
* - Councillor seeking re-election

Comparisons are made with the 1935 election results.

=== Abercromby ===
No. 9 Abercromby
Party	Candidate	Votes	%	±%
Conservative	Charles William Bailey *	2,239	51%	
Labour	Joseph Henry Sayle	2,154	49%	
Majority		85		
Registered electors		9,676		
Turnout		4,393	45%	
Conservative hold		Swing		

=== Aigburth ===
No. 17 Aigburth
Party	Candidate	Votes	%	±%
Conservative	Vere Egerton Cotton O.B.E *	unopposed		
Registered electors				
Conservative hold		Swing		

=== Allerton ===
No. 35 Allerton
Party	Candidate	Votes	%	±%
Conservative	John McMillan	2,061	79%	
Labour	Cedric E. Hargreaves	537	21%	
Majority		1,524		
Registered electors		6,459		
Turnout		2,598	40%	
Conservative hold		Swing		

=== Anfield ===
No. 29 Anfield
Party	Candidate	Votes	%	±%
Conservative	Albert Joseph White	unopposed		
Registered electors				
Conservative gain from Liberal		Swing		

=== Breckfield ===
No. 30 Breckfield
Party	Candidate	Votes	%	±%
Conservative	Ada Martha Burton *	2,642	70%	
Labour	William Tipping	1,139	30%	
Majority		1,503		
Registered electors		9,948		
Turnout		3,781	38%	
Conservative hold		Swing		

=== Brunswick ===
No. 11 Brunswick
Party	Candidate	Votes	%	±%
	Annie Cain	unopposed		
Registered electors				
	hold	Swing		

=== Castle Street ===
No. 7 Castle Street
Party	Candidate	Votes	%	±%
Conservative	James Bennett O.B.E. *	unopposed		
Registered electors				
Conservative hold		Swing		

=== Childwall ===
No. 38 Childwall
Party	Candidate	Votes	%	±%
Liberal	William John Tristram *	2,107	83%	
Labour	Arthur Andrew Arnot	417	17%	
Majority		1,690		
Registered electors		8,252		
Turnout		2,524	31%	
Liberal hold		Swing		

=== Croxteth ===
No. 40 Croxteth
Party	Candidate	Votes	%	±%
Labour	George Henry Boothman *	unopposed		
Registered electors				
Labour hold		Swing		

=== Dingle ===
No. 12 Dingle
Party	Candidate	Votes	%	±%
Conservative	Edward Thomas White	4,645	58%	
Labour	Charles Matthew Belk *	3,306	42%	
Majority		1,339		
Registered electors		14,990		
Turnout		7,951	53%	
Conservative gain from Labour		Swing		

=== Edge Hill ===
No. 18 Edge Hill
Party	Candidate	Votes	%	±%
Labour	Alexander Griffin *	3,230	51%	
Conservative	Stephen Minion	3,082	49%	
Majority		148		
Registered electors		11,129		
Turnout		6,312	57%	
Labour hold		Swing		

=== Everton ===
No. 21 Everton
Party	Candidate	Votes	%	±%
Labour	John Braddock *	unopposed		
Registered electors				
Labour hold		Swing		

=== Exchange ===
No. 5 Exchange
Party	Candidate	Votes	%	±%
Independent	John Granby	765	72%	
Labour	John George Morgan	300	28%	
Majority		465		
Registered electors		2,122		
Turnout		1,065	50%	
Independent hold		Swing		

=== Fairfield ===
No. 31 Fairfield
Party	Candidate	Votes	%	±%
Conservative	Richard Clitherow *	2,665	70%	
Labour	Isadore Levin	1,121	30%	
Majority		1,544		
Registered electors		10,421		
Turnout		3,786	36%	
Conservative hold		Swing		

=== Fazakerley ===
No. 27 Fazakerley
Party	Candidate	Votes	%	±%
Conservative	Kenneth Pugh Thompson	3,477	62%	
Labour	Sarah Anne McArd	2,100	38%	
Majority		1,377		
Registered electors		13,039		
Turnout		5,577	43%	
Conservative hold		Swing		

=== Garston ===
No. 37 Garston
Party	Candidate	Votes	%	±%
Conservative	Joseph Williams	2,299	53%	
Labour	William Sydney Dytor *	2,044	47%	
Majority		255		
Registered electors		8,467		
Turnout		4,343	51%	
Conservative gain from Labour		Swing		

=== Granby ===
No. 14 Granby
Party	Candidate	Votes	%	±%
Conservative	James Edward Thompson	2,203	54%	
Labour	Charles Edward Burke *	1,888	46%	
Majority		315		
Registered electors		9,442		
Turnout		4,091	43%	
Conservative gain from Labour		Swing		

=== Great George ===
No. 10 Great George
Party	Candidate	Votes	%	±%
Labour	Percy Ernest Sherwin *	866	56%	
Independent	John Michael Fanning	690	44%	
Majority		196		
Registered electors		4,144		
Turnout		1,576	38%	
Labour hold		Swing		

=== Kensington ===
No. 19 Kensington
Party	Candidate	Votes	%	±%
Conservative	Frederick Harold Bailey *	2,961	67%	
Labour	John Marshall Campbell	1,443	33%	
Majority		1,518		
Registered electors		10,824		
Turnout		4,404	41%	
Conservative hold		Swing		

=== Kirkdale ===
No. 24 Kirkdale
Party	Candidate	Votes	%	±%
Conservative	Herbert Henry Nuttall	4,376	54%	
Labour	William H. Barton *	3,699	46%	
Majority		677		
Registered electors		16.007		
Turnout		8.075	50%	
Conservative hold		Swing		

=== Low Hill ===
No. 20 Low Hill
Party	Candidate	Votes	%	±%
Conservative	John Nuttall Maxwell Entwistle	2,840	51%	
Labour	Fred Robinson *	2,686	49%	
Majority		154		
Registered electors				
Turnout		5,526		
Conservative gain from Labour		Swing		

=== Much Woolton ===
No. 36 Much Woolton
Party	Candidate	Votes	%	±%
Conservative	Isaac Robinson *	1,144	76%	
Labour	Daniel Whelan	359	24%	
Majority		785		
Registered electors		2,975		
Turnout		1,503	51%	
Conservative hold		Swing		

=== Netherfield ===
No. 22 Netherfield
Party	Candidate	Votes	%	±%
Conservative	William John Matthew Clark *	3,571	72%	
Labour	William James Riddick	1,379	28%	
Majority		2,192		
Registered electors		10,299		
Turnout		1,503	48%	
Conservative hold		Swing		

=== North Scotland ===
No. 2 North Scotland
Party	Candidate	Votes	%	±%
Labour	Patrick O'Brien *	unopposed		
Registered electors				
Labour hold		Swing		

=== Old Swan ===
No. 32 Old Swan
Party	Candidate	Votes	%	±%
Conservative	Jennet Waterworth	3,573	63%	
Labour	Jane Riddell	2,070	37%	
Majority		1,503		
Registered electors		18,159		
Turnout		5,643	31%	
Conservative hold		Swing		

=== Prince's Park ===
No. 13 Prince's Park
Party	Candidate	Votes	%	±%
Conservative	Charles Rowland Clare *	2,849	64%	
Labour	Alfred Demain	1,607	36%	
Majority		1,242		
Registered electors		9,349		
Turnout		4,456	48%	
Conservative hold		Swing		

=== Sandhills ===
No. 1 Sandhills
Party	Candidate	Votes	%	±%
Labour	Stanley Part *	unopposed		
Registered electors				
Labour hold		Swing		

=== St. Anne's ===
No. 6 St. Anne's
Party	Candidate	Votes	%	±%
Labour	Harry Livermore	unopposed		
Registered electors				
Labour hold		Swing		

=== St. Domingo ===
No. 23 St. Domingo
Party	Candidate	Votes	%	±%
Protestant	Mary Jane Longbottom *	2,828	70%	
Labour	James Cullen	1,189	30%	
Majority		1,639		
Registered electors		10,957		
Turnout		4,017	37%	
Protestant hold		Swing		

=== St. Peter's ===
No. 8 St. Peter's
Party	Candidate	Votes	%	±%
Liberal	John Bennion *	545	59%	
Labour	Robert Edward Cottier	374	41%	
Majority		171		
Registered electors		2,214		
Turnout		919	42%	
Liberal hold		Swing		

=== Sefton Park East ===
No. 15 Sefton Park East
Party	Candidate	Votes	%	±%
Conservative	John Moores *	2,249	75%	
Labour	Arthur Leadbetter	761	25%	
Majority		1,488		
Registered electors		8,809		
Turnout		3,010	34%	
Conservative hold		Swing		

=== Sefton Park West ===
No. 16 Sefton Park West
Party	Candidate	Votes	%	±%
Conservative	Alexander Maver Finlayson	2,255	77%	
Labour	Muriel Edith Mee	684	23%	
Majority		1,571		
Registered electors		6,839		
Turnout		2,939	43%	
Conservative hold		Swing		

=== South Scotland ===
No. 3 South Scotland
Party	Candidate	Votes	%	±%
Labour	John Sheehan *	unopposed		
Registered electors				
Labour hold		Swing		

=== Vauxhall ===
No. 4 Vauxhall
Party	Candidate	Votes	%	±%
Labour	Arthur Brian Hoer *	unopposed		
Registered electors				
Labour hold		Swing		

=== Walton ===
No. 25 Walton
Party	Candidate	Votes	%	±%
Conservative	John Harold Irwin *	4,844	73%	
Labour	Charles W. Baker	1,786	27%	
Majority		3,058		
Registered electors		16,501		
Turnout		6,630	40%	
Conservative hold		Swing		

=== Warbreck ===
No. 26 Warbreck
Party	Candidate	Votes	%	±%
Conservative	James Jude *	2,986	73%	
Labour	Charles McDonald	1,128	27%	
Majority		1,858		
Registered electors		13,363		
Turnout		4,114	31%	
Conservative hold		Swing		

=== Wavertree ===
No. 34 Wavertree
Party	Candidate	Votes	%	±%
Conservative	Stanley Ronald Williams *	4,243	74%	
Labour	Duncan Mackay	1,475	26%	
Majority		2,768		
Registered electors		15,491		
Turnout		5,718	37%	
Conservative hold		Swing		

=== Wavertree West ===
No. 33 Wavertree West
Party	Candidate	Votes	%	±%
Conservative	Harold Lees	2,485	68%	
Labour	Frederick Stapleton	1,195	32%	
Majority		1,290		
Registered electors		8,620		
Turnout		3,680	43%	
Conservative hold		Swing		

=== West Derby ===
No. 28 West Derby
Party	Candidate	Votes	%	±%
Conservative	Albert Morrow *	unopposed		
Registered electors				
Conservative hold		Swing		

== Aldermanic elections ==
=== Aldermanic Election 9 November 1938 ===
At the meeting of the council on 9 November 1938, the terms of office of nineteen of the aldermen expired and the councillors (but not including the sitting aldermen) elected the following aldermen for a term of six years.

* - re-elected aldermen.

Party	Name	Votes
Conservative	Robert Lowry Burns J.P. *	79
Conservative	Henry Alexander Cole J.P. *	79
Conservative	James Conrad Cross J.P. *	79
Liberal	William Denton J.P.	79
Conservative	Michael Cory Dixon J.P. *	79
Liberal	Sir Charles Sydney Jones *	79
Conservative	Lady Helena Agnes Dalrymple Muspratt J.P. *	79
Conservative	William Thomas Roberts J.P.	79
Conservative	Edward Russell-Taylor J.P. *	79
Conservative	Robert Garnett Sheldon *	79
Conservative	Alfred Ernest Shennan J.P. *	79
Conservative	Edwin Thompson J.P. *	79
Conservative	Councillor George Young Williamson	79
Liberal	Alfred Gates J.P. *	78
Liberal	Arthur Richard Price *	76
Labour	Thomas Burke J.P. *	55
Independent	Austin Harford J.P. *	55
Labour	Lawrence King J.P. *	29
Labour	Luke Hogan M.B.E. J.P. *	28

=== Aldermanic Election 1 February 1939 ===
Following the death on 27 December 1938 of Alderman Sir James Sexton C.B.E., (Labour, last elected as an alderman on 9 November 1935), in whose place Councillor Bertie Victor Kirby M.P. J.P. (Labour, elected for Edge Hill on 1 November 1936) was elected by the councillors as an alderman on 1 February 1939.

Aldermanic Election 1 February 1939
Party	Candidate	Votes	%	Allocated ward
Labour	Councillor Bertie Victor Kirby M.P. J.P.	60	100%	No. 14 Granby

The term of office to expire on 9 November 1941.

=== Aldermanic Election 3 May 1939 ===
Caused by the death on 10 April 1939 of Alderman George Young Williamson (Conservative, last elected as an alderman on 9 November 1938), in whose place Councillor Robert John Hall (Conservative, elected for Walton on 1 November 1936) was elected by the councillors as an alderman on 3 May 1939.

Aldermanic Election 3 May 1939
Party	Candidate	Votes	%	Allocated ward
Conservative	Councillor Robert John Hall	62	100%	No. 6 St. Anne's

The term of office to expire on 9 November 1945.

=== Aldermanic Election 6 September 1939 ===
Following the death on 24 July 1939 of Alderman Frank Campbell Wilson (Conservative, last elected as an alderman on 9 November 1935), Councillor Gertrude Elizabeth Wilson (Conservative, elected for the Allerton ward on 1 November 1937) was elected by the councillors as an Alderman on 6 September 1939.

Aldermanic Election 6 September 1939
Party	Candidate	Votes	%	Allocated ward
Conservative	Councillor Gertrude Elizabeth Wilson	62	100%	No. 12 Dingle

The term of office to expire on 9 November 1941.

=== Aldermanic Election 9 November 1939 ===
Following the death of Alderman Edward Russell-Taylor (Conservative, last elected as an alderman on 9 November 1938), Councillor Edward James Deane (Conservative, elected to the Aigburth ward on 1 November 1936) was elected by the councillors as an alderman on 9 November 1939.

Aldermanic Election 6 December 1939
Party	Candidate	Votes	%	Allocated ward
Conservative	Councillor Edward James Deane	70	100%	No. 11 Brunswick

The term of office to expire on 9 November 1944.

=== Aldermanic Elections 3 April 1940 ===
Following the death, on 19 March 1940, of Alderman John Morris Griffith (Conservative, elected as an alderman on 1 December 1937) Councillor John Case J.P. of "Eversley" Island Road, Harston (Conservative, elected to the Kensington ward on 1 November 1937) was elected as an alderman on 3 April 1940 to fill this vacancy.

Aldermanic Election 3 April 1940
Party	Candidate	Votes	%	Allocated ward
Conservative	Councillor John Case	59	100%	No. 28 West Derby

The term of office to expire on 9 November 1941.

Following the resignation of Alderman Richard Rutherford, Councillor George Alfred Strong J.P. of "Palmyra" Harthill Road, Liverpool 18 (Conservative, elected to the Allerton ward on 1 November 1936) was elected by the councillors as an alderman on 3 April 1940.

Aldermanic Election 3 April 1940
Party	Candidate	Votes	%	Allocated ward
Conservative	Councillor George Alfred Strong	59	100%	No. 34 Wavertree

The term of office to expire on 9 November 1941.

=== Aldermanic Election 3 July 1940 ===
Following the death, on 28 May 1940 of Alderman John George Paris (Conservative, last elected as an alderman on 9 November 1935), Councillor James Graham Reece J.P. of 15 Aigburth Drive (Conservative, elected to the Sefton Park West ward in 1937) was elected by the councillors as an alderman on 3 July 1940

Aldermanic Election 3 July 1940
Party	Candidate	Votes	%	Allocated ward
Conservative	Councillor James Graham Reece	56	100%	No. 15 Sefton Park East

The term of office to expire on 9 November 1941.

=== Aldermanic Elections 5 February 1941 ===
Following the death, on 18 January 1941, of Alderman Robert Lowry Burns (Conservative, last elected as an alderman on 9 November 1938), Councillor Charles Gordon Snowden Gordon J.P. of 34 Princes Avenue, Liverpool 8 (Conservative, elected to the Fairfield ward on 1 November 1937) was elected by the councillors as an alderman on 5 February 1941 .

Aldermanic Election 5 February 1941
Party	Candidate	Votes	%	Allocated ward
Conservative	Councillor Charles Gordon Snowden Gordon	56	100%	No. 32 Old Swan

The term of office to expire on 9 November 1941.

Following the resignation of Alderman Henry Morley Miller (Conservative, last elected as an alderman on 9 November 1935), Councillor Alexander Critchley, Incorporated Accountant of 454 Aigburth Road, Liverpool 19 (Conservative, elected for the Warbreck ward on 1 November 1937) was elected as an alderman by the councillors on 5 February 1941.

Aldermanic Election 5 February 1941
Party	Candidate	Votes	%	Allocated ward
Conservative	Councillor Alexander Critchley	59	100%	No. 35 Allerton

The term of office to expire on 9 November 1941.

=== Aldermanic Election 7 May 1941 ===
Following the death on 18 April 1941, of Alderman John Wolfe Tone Morrissey (Labour, last elected as an alderman on 6 October 1937), Councillor Joseph Jackson Cleary of 45 Kremlin Drive, Liverpool 13 (Labour, elected for the Garston ward on 1 November 1936) was elected as an alderman by the councillors on 7 May 1941

Aldermanic Election 7 May 1941
Party	Candidate	Votes	%	Allocated ward
Labour	Councillor Joseph Jackson Cleary	23	100%	No. 33 Wavertree West

The term of office to expire on 9 November 1941.

=== Aldermanic Election 1 September 1943 ===
Following the death, on 30 July 1943, of Alderman Dr. Robert Garnett Sheldon (Conservative, last elected as an alderman on 9 November 1938), Councillor William Greenough Gregson J.P. (Conservative, elected to represent the Fazakerley ward on 1 November 1936) was elected by the councillors as an alderman to fill the vacancy on 1 September 1943

Aldermanic Election 1 September 1943
Party	Candidate	Votes	%	Allocated ward
Conservative	Councillor William Greenough Gregson	45	100%	Exchange

=== Aldermanic Election 6 October 1943 ===
Following the death, on 13 September 1943, of Alderman Lady Helena Agnes Daltymple Muspratt (Conservative, last elected as an alderman on 9 November 1938), Councillor Ernest Ash Cookson (Conservative, elected to represent the West Derby ward on 1 November 1936) was elected by the councillors as an alderman on 6 October 1943.

Aldermanic Election 6 October 1943
Party	Candidate	Votes	%	Allocated ward
Conservative	Councillor Ernest Ash Cookson	54	100%	Aigburth

=== Aldermanic Election 27 October 1943 ===
Following the death, on 28 September 1943, of Alderman Edward James Deane (Conservative, elected as an alderman on 6 December 1939), Councillor Moss Greenberg (Conservative, last elected to the Old Swan ward on 1 November 1936) was elected by the councillors as an alderman on 27 October 1943

Aldermanic Election 27 October 1943
Party	Candidate	Votes	%	Allocated ward
Conservative	Councillor Moss Greenberg			

=== Aldermanic Elections 9 November 1943 ===
Following the death, on 19 October 1943, of Alderman Herbert Edward Rose (Labour, last elected as an alderman on 9 November 1935), Councillor Patrick Fay (Labour, last elected to represent the North Scotland ward on 1 November 1937) was elected by the councillors as an alderman on 9 November 1943.

Aldermanic Election 9 November 1943
Party	Candidate	Votes	%	Allocated ward
Conservative	Patrick Fay	32	100%	Kirkdale

Following the resignation of Alderman William Muirhead (Conservative, last elected on 9 November 1935), Councillor Walter Thomas Lancashire J.P. (Conservative, elected to represent the Sefton Park West ward on 1 November 1936) was elected by the councillors as an alderman on 9 November 1943.

Aldermanic Election 9 November 1943
Party	Candidate	Votes	%	Allocated ward
Conservative	Walter Thomas Lancashire	55	100%	Netherfield

=== Aldermanic Election 5 January 1944 ===
Following the death, on 10 December 1943 of Alderman Thomas Burke (Labour, last elected as an alderman on 9 November 1938), Councillor Peter Kavanagh (Independent, elected unopposed for the Exchange ward on 1 November 1937) was elected by the councillors as an alderman on 5 January 1944.

Aldermanic Election 5 January 1944
Party	Candidate	Votes	%	Allocated ward
Independent	Peter Kavanagh	51	100%	Vauxhall

=== Aldermanic Election 1 March 1944 ===
Following the resignation of Alderman Arthur Richard Price (Liberal, last elected as an alderman on 9 November 1938), Councillor William John Tristram J.P. (Liberal, elected to represent the Childwall ward on 1 November 1938) was elected by the councillors as an alderman on 1 March 1944

Aldermanic Election 1 March 1944
Party	Candidate	Votes	%	Allocated ward
Liberal	William John Tristram	55	100%	Castle Street

=== Aldermanic Election 9 November 1944 ===
Following the death on 3 October 1944 of the Lord Mayor, Alderman Austin Harford (Independent last elected as an alderman on 9 November 1938), Councillor James Farrell (Independent, elected for the Exchange ward on 1 November 1936) was elected by the councillors as an alderman on 9 November 1944.

Aldermanic Election 9 November 1944
Party	Candidate	Votes	%	Allocated ward
Independent	Councillor James Farrell	57	100%	North Scotland

== By-elections ==
=== No. 18 Edge Hill, ===
Following the death on 27 December 1938 of Alderman Sir James Sexton C.B.E. (Labour, last elected as an alderman on 9 November 1935), in whose place Councillor Bertie Victor Kirby M.P. J.P. (Labour, elected for Edge Hill on 1 November 1935), was elected by the councillors as an alderman on 1 February 1939, causing a vacancy for the Edge Hill ward.

No. 18 Edge Hill
Party	Candidate	Votes	%	±%
Majority				
Registered electors		11,129		
Turnout				
		Swing		

=== No. 8 St. Peter's, 7 February 1939 ===
Caused by the resignation of Councillor Hugh Carr (Labour, elected 1 November 1937).

No. 8 St. Peter's 7 February 1939
Party	Candidate	Votes	%	±%
Conservative	Herbert Wilson Stacey	406	46%	
Labour	John David Towers	261	36%	
Independent	David Robin Adair	62	8.5%	
Majority		145		
Registered electors		2,214		
Turnout		729	33%	
Labour hold		Swing		

The term of office to expire on 1 November 1940.

== Wartime arrangements ==
Under the Local Elections and Register of Electors (Temporary Provisions) Acts, 1939, 1940 and 1941 local elections were not held during the Second World War, terms of office of councillors were extended whilst the Acts were in force, and vacancies for councillors were filled by the Council appointing replacements. The Council continued to hold Aldermanic elections as normal.

=== No.35 Allerton, 29 September 1939 ===
Caused by Councillor Gertrude Elizabeth Wilson (Conservative, elected for the Allerton ward on 1 November 1937) being elected by the councillors as an alderman on 6 September 1939, following the death on 24 July 1939 of Alderman Frank Campbell Wilson (Conservative, last elected as an alderman on 9 November 1935)

No. 35 Allerton 29 September 1939
Party	Candidate	Votes	%	±%
	Margaret Jane Strong	unopposed		
		Swing		

The term of office to expire on 1 November 1941.

=== No.25 Walton, 9 November 1939 ===
Caused by Councillor Robert John Hall (Conservative, elected for Walton on 1 November 1936) being elected by the councillors as an alderman on 3 May 1939, following the death on 10 April 1939 of Alderman George Young Williamson (Conservative, last elected as an alderman on 9 November 1939).

Richard Edward Searle (Conservative) was appointed by the Council as a councillor for the Walton ward on 9 November 1939.

No. 25 Walton, Appointment of Councillor 9 November 1939
Party	Former councillor	Appointed replacement	Term expires
Conservative	Robert John Hall	Richard Edward Searle	1942

=== No. 26 Warbreck, 9 November 1939 ===
Following the death on 1 November 1939 of Councillor Hugh Wagstaff (Conservative, elected for Warbreck on 25 July 1939.

Herbert William Metcalf (Conservative) was appointed by the Council as Councillor for the Warbreck ward on 9 November 1939.

No. 26 Warbreck, Appointment of Councillor 9 November 1939
Party	Former councillor	Appointed replacement	Term expires
Conservative	Councillor Hugh Wagstaff	Herbert William Metcalf	19

=== No. 40 Croxteth, 9 November 1939 ===
William Henry Barton (Labour) was appointed by the Council as Councillor for the Croxteth ward on 9 November 1939.

No. 40 Croxteth, Appointment of Councillor 9 November 1939
Party	Former councillor	Appointed replacement	Term expires
Labour		William Henry Barton	19

=== No. 17 Aigburth, 6 December 1939 ===
Following the death of Alderman Edward Russell-Taylor (Conservative, last elected as an alderman on 9 November 1938), Councillor Edward James Deane (Conservative, elected to the Aigburth ward on 1 November 1936) was elected by the councillors as an alderman on 9 November 1939.

Herbert Mylrea Allen was appointed by the Council as Councillor for the Aigburth ward on 6 December 1939.

No. 17 Aigburth, Appointment of Councillor 6 December 1939
Party	Former councillor	Appointed replacement	Term expires
Conservative	Councillor Edward James Deane	Herbert Mylrea Allen	19

=== No. 19 Kensington 1 May 1940 ===
Alderman John Morris Griffith (Conservative, elected as an alderman on 1 December 1937) died on 19 March 1940. In his place, Councillor John Case (Conservative, elected to the Kensington ward on 1 November 1937) was elected as an alderman on 3 April 1940 to fill this vacancy.

Stephen Minion was appointed by the Council as Councillor for the Kensington ward on 1 May 1940.

No. 19 Kensington, Appointment of Councillor 1 May 1940
Party	Former councillor	Appointed replacement	Term expires
Conservative	Councillor John Case	Stephen Minion	19

=== No. 35 Allerton, 1 May 1940 ===
Following the resignation of Alderman Richard Rutherford, Councillor George Alfred Strong (Conservative, elected to the Allerton ward on 1 November 1936) was elected by the councillors as an alderman on 3 April 1940.

Robert Henry Gregory was appointed by the Council as Councillor for the Allerton ward on 1 May 1940.

No. 35 Allerton, Appointment of Councillor 1 May 1940
Party	Former councillor	Appointed replacement	Term expires
Conservative	Councillor George Alfred Strong	Robert Henry Gregory	19

=== No. 16 Sefton Park West, 4 September 1940 ===
Following the death, on 28 May 1940 of Alderman John George Paris (Conservative, last elected as an alderman on 9 November 1935), Councillor James Graham Reece (Conservative, elected to the Sefton Park West ward in 1937) was elected by the councillors as an alderman on 4 September 1940.

No. 16 Sefton Park West, Appointment of Councillor 4 September 1940
Party	Former councillor	Appointed replacement	Term expires
Conservative	Councillor James Graham Reece		

=== No. 22 Netherfield, 9 November 1940 ===
George Edward Lewis was appointed by the Council as Councillor for the Netherfield ward on 9 November 1940.

No. 22 Netherfield, Appointment of Councillor 9 November 1940
Party	Former councillor	Appointed replacement	Term expires
Conservative		George Edward Lewis	19

=== No. 15 Sefton Park East, 4 December 1940 ===
Arthur Maiden (Conservative) was appointed by the Council as Councillor for the Sefton Park East ward on 4 December 1940.

No. 15 Sefton Park East, Appointment of Councillor 4 December 1940
Party	Former councillor	Appointed replacement	Term expires
Conservative		Arthur Maiden	

=== No. 10 Great George, 4 December 1940 ===
Councillor Joseph Campbell (Labour, elected for the Great George ward on 1 November 1936) having not attended any meetings of the City Council was disqualified as councillor under sections 63 and 64 of the Local Government Act 1933 on 9 November 1940.

Robert Edward Cottier (Labour) was appointed by the Council as Councillor for the Great George ward on 4 December 1940.

No. 10 Great George, Appointment of Councillor 4 December 1940
Party	Former councillor	Appointed replacement	Term expires
Labour	Councillor Joseph Campbell	Robert Edward Cottier	19

=== No. 31 Fairfield, 5 March 1941 ===
Following the death, in January 1941, of Alderman Robert Lowry Burns (Conservative, last elected as an alderman on 9 November 1938), Councillor Charles Gordon Snowden Gordon (Conservative, elected to the Fairfield ward on 1 November 1937) was elected by the councillors as an alderman on 5 February 1941.

Charles Tillston was appointed by the Council as Councillor for the Fairfield ward on 5 March 1941.

No. 31 Fairfield, Appointment of Councillor 5 March 1941
Party	Former councillor	Appointed replacement	Term expires
Conservative	Councillor Charles Gordon Snowden Gordon	Charles Tillston	19

=== No. 26 Warbreck, 5 March 1941 ===
Following the resignation of Alderman Henry Morley Miller (Conservative, last elected as an alderman on 9 November 1935), Councillor Alexander Critchley (Conservative, elected for the Warbreck ward on 1 November 1937) was elected as an alderman by the councillors on 5 February 1941.

John Green was appointed by the Council as Councillor for the Warbreck ward on 5 March 1941.

No. 26 Warbreck, Appointment of Councillor 5 March 1941
Party	Former councillor	Appointed replacement	Term expires
Conservative	Councillor Alexander Critchley	John Green	19

=== No. 14 Brunswick, 7 May 1941 ===
Andrew Bennett was appointed by the Council as Councillor for the Brunswick ward on 7 May 1941.

No. 14 Brunswick, Appointment of Councillor 7 May 1941
Party	Former councillor	Appointed replacement	Term expires
		Andrew Bennett	

=== No. 37 Garston, 4 June 1941 ===
Following the death of Alderman John Wolfe Tone Morrissey (Labour, last elected as an alderman on 6 October 1937), Councillor Joseph Jackson Cleary (Labour, elected for the Garston ward on 1 November 1936) was elected as an alderman by the councillors on 7 May 1941.

Alfred Demain was appointed by the Council as Councillor for the Garston ward on 7 May 1941.

No. 37 Garston, Appointment of Councillor 4 June 1941
Party	Former councillor	Appointed replacement	Term expires
Labour	Councillor Joseph Jackson Cleary	Alfred Demain	19

=== No. 11 Brunswick, 2 July 1941 ===
Caused by the death on 28 May 1941 of Councillor Thomas Hanley (Labour, last elected for the Brunswick ward on 1 November 1936).

Frank H. Cain was appointed by the Council as Councillor for the Brunswick ward on 2 July 1941.

No. 11 Brunswick, Appointment of Councillor 2 July 1941
Party	Former councillor	Appointed replacement	Term expires
Labour	Councillor Thomas Hanley	Frank H. Cain	

=== No. 10 Great George, 3 February 1942 ===
John David Towers was appointed by the Council as Councillor for the Great George ward on 3 February 1942.

No. 10 Great George, Appointment of Councillor 3 February 1942
Party	Former councillor	Appointed replacement	Term expires
		John David Towers	

=== No. 13 Prince's Park, 3 March 1942 ===
Charles Cowlin was appointed by the Council as Councillor for the Prince's Park ward on 3 March 1942.

No. 13 Prince's Park, Appointment of Councillor 3 March 1942
Party	Former councillor	Appointed replacement	Term expires
Conservative		Charles Cowlin	

=== No. 32 Old Swan ===
Following the death, on 28 September 1943, of Alderman Edward James Deane (Conservative, elected as an alderman on 6 December 1939), Councillor Moss Greenberg (Conservative, last elected to the Old Swan ward on 1 November 1936) was elected by the councillors as an alderman on 27 October 1943.

No. 32 Old Swan, Appointment of Councillor 27 October 1943
Party	Former councillor	Appointed replacement	Term expires
Conservative	Councillor Moss Greenberg		

=== No. 27 Fazakerley, 6 October 1943 ===
Following the death, on 30 July 1943, of Alderman Dr.Robert Garnett Sheldon (Conservative, last elected as an alderman on 9 November 1938), Councillor William Greenough Gregson J.P. (Conservative, elected to represent the Fazakerley ward on 1 November 1936) was elected by the councillors as an alderman to fill the vacancy on 1 September 1943

Robert Alexander Smith was appointed by the Council as Councillor for the Fazakerley ward on 6 October 1943.

No. 27 Fazakerley, Appointment of Councillor 6 October 1943
Party	Former councillor	Appointed replacement	Term expires
Conservative	Councillor William Greenough Gregson J.P.	Robert Alexander Smith	19

=== No. 28 West Derby, 27 October 1943 ===
Following the death, on 13 September 1943, of Alderman Lady Helena Agnes Daltymple Muspratt (Conservative, last elected as an alderman on 9 November 1938), Councillor Ernest Ash Cookson (Conservative, elected to represent the West Derby ward on 1 November 1936) was elected by the councillors as an alderman on 6 October 1943.

Robert Cyril Beattie was appointed by the Council as Councillor for the West Derby ward on 27 October 1943.

No. 28 West Derby, Appointment of Councillor 27 October 1943
Party	Former councillor	Appointed replacement	Term expires
Conservative	Councillor Ernest Ash Cookson	Robert Cyril Beattie	19

=== No. 32 Old Swan, 9 November 1943 ===
Ernest Walker was appointed by the Council as Councillor for the Old Swan ward on 9 November 1943.

No. 32 Old Swan, Appointment of Councillor 9 November 1943
Party	Former councillor	Appointed replacement	Term expires
		Ernest Walker	

=== No. 2 North Scotland, 1 December 1943 ===
Following the death, on 19 October 1943, of Alderman Herbert Edward Rose (Labour, last elected as an alderman on 9 November 1935), Councillor Patrick Fay (Labour, last elected to represent the North Scotland ward on 1 November 1937) was elected by the councillors as an alderman on 9 November 1943.

Thomas Fay was appointed by the Council as Councillor for the North Scotland ward on 9 November 1943.

No. 2 North Scotland, Appointment of Councillor 1 December 1943
Party	Former councillor	Appointed replacement	Term expires
Labour	Councillor Patrick Fay	Thomas Fay	19

=== No. 16 Sefton Park West, 2 February 1944 ===
Following the resignation of Alderman William Muirhead (Conservative, last elected on 9 November 1935), Councillor Walter Thomas Lancashire J.P. (Conservative, elected to represent the Sefton Park West ward on 1 November 1936) was elected by the councillors as an alderman on 9 November 1943.

Arthur Brierley Collins was appointed by the Council as Councillor for the Sefton Park West ward on 2 February 1944.

No. 16 Sefton Park West, Appointment of Councillor 2 February 1944
Party	Former councillor	Appointed replacement	Term expires
Conservative	Councillor Walter Thomas Lancashire J.P.	Arthur Brierley Collins	19

=== No. 5 Exchange, 2 February 1944 ===
Following the death, on 10 December 1943 of Alderman Thomas Burke (Labour, last elected as an alderman on 9 November 1938), Councillor Peter Kavanagh (Independent, elected unopposed for the Exchange ward on 1 November 1937) was elected by the councillors as an alderman on 5 January 1944.

Herbert Francis Granby was appointed by the Council as Councillor for the Exchange ward on 2 February 1944.

No. 5 Exchange, Appointment of Councillor 2 February 1944
Party	Former councillor	Appointed replacement	Term expires
Independent	Councillor Peter Kavanagh	Herbert Francis Granby	19

=== No. 38 Childwall, 5 April 1944 ===
Following the resignation of Alderman Arthur Richard Price (Liberal, last elected as an alderman on 9 November 1938), Councillor William John Tristram J.P. (Liberal, elected to represent the Childwall ward on 1 November 1938) was elected by the councillors as an alderman on 1 March 1944.

John Richard Jones J.P. was appointed by the Council as Councillor for the Childwall ward on 5 April 1944.

No. 38 Childwall, Appointment of Councillor 5 April 1944
Party	Former councillor	Appointed replacement	Term expires
Liberal	Councillor William John Tristram J.P.	John Richard Jones J.P.	19

=== No. 8 St. Peter's, 3 May 1944 ===
William Henry Ledsom was appointed by the Council as Councillor for the St. Peter's ward on 3 May 1944.

No. 8 St. Peter's, Appointment of Councillor 3 May 1944
Party	Former councillor	Appointed replacement	Term expires
		William Henry Ledsom	

=== No. 4 Vauxhall, 5 July 1944 ===
Following the death of Councillor Joseph Leo Jones (??) on 9 May 1944 (Labour, elected unopposed for the Vauxhall ward on 1 November 1938), Joseph Cyril Brady was appointed by the Council as Councillor for the Vauxhall ward on 5 July 1944.

No. 4 Vauxhall, Appointment of Councillor 5 July 1944
Party	Former councillor	Appointed replacement	Term expires
Labour		Joseph Cyril Brady	

=== No. 20 Low Hill, 5 July 1944 ===
William John Acheson was appointed by the Council as Councillor for the Low Hill ward on 5 July 1944.

No. 20 Low Hill, Appointment of Councillor 5 July 1944
Party	Former councillor	Appointed replacement	Term expires
Conservative		William John Acheson	

=== No. 31 Fairfield, 26 July 1944 ===
Charles Frederick Elias was appointed by the Council as Councillor for the Fairfield ward on 26 July 1944.

No. 31 Fairfield, Appointment of Councillor 26 July 1944
Party	Former councillor	Appointed replacement	Term expires
Conservative		Charles Frederick Elias	

=== No. 5 Exchange, 6 December 1944 ===
Following the death on 3 October 1944 of the Lord Mayor, Alderman Austin Harford (Independent last elected as an alderman on 9 November 1938), Councillor James Farrell (Independent, elected for the Exchange ward on 1 November 1936) was elected by the councillors as an alderman on 9 November 1944.

Leo Henry Wright J.P. was appointed by the Council as Councillor for the Exchange ward on 6 December 1944.

No. 5 Exchange, Appointment of Councillor 6 December 1944
Party	Former councillor	Appointed replacement	Term expires
Independent	Councillor James Farrell	Leo Henry Wright J.P.	

=== No. 20 Low Hill, 2 May 1945 ===
Following the death of Councillor William John Acheson (appointed 5 July 1944) on 15 March 1945, George Moore was appointed by the Council as Councillor for the Low Hill ward on 2 May 1945.

No. 20 Low Hill, Appointment of Councillor 2 May 1945
Party	Former councillor	Appointed replacement	Term expires
Conservative	Councillor William John Acheson	George Moore	

=== No. 34 Wavertree, ===
Following the death on 25 August 1945 of Alderman Joseph Belger (Independent, last elected as an alderman on 9 November 1935), Councillor Alfred Levy (Conservative, Wavertree West 1936) was elected by the councillors as an alderman on 3 October 1945.

No. 26 Warbreck, Appointment of Councillor 3 October 1945
Party	Former councillor	Appointed replacement	Term expires
Conservative	Councillor Alfred Levy		

== See also ==
- Liverpool City Council
- Liverpool Town Council elections 1835 - 1879
- Liverpool City Council elections 1880–present
- Mayors and Lord Mayors of Liverpool 1207 to present
- History of local government in England
