= 1936 Liverpool City Council election =

1936 UK local government election

← 1935	1 November 1936	1937 →

39 councillors' seats were up for election

Elections to Liverpool City Council were held on 1 November 1936. One third of the council seats were up for election, the term of office of each councillor being three years.

Six of the thirty nine seats up for election were uncontested.

After the election for the councillors and the aldermanic election (held on 9 November 1936), the composition of the council was:

Party	Councillors	±	Aldermen	Total
Conservative	??	+3	??	??
Labour	??	-3	??	??
Liberal	??	0	??	??
Protestant	??	+1	??	??
Independent	??	-1	??	??

== Election result ==
Liverpool local election result 1936
Party	Seats	Gains	Losses	Net gain/loss	Seats %	Votes %	Votes	+/−
Conservative	20	3	0	+3	51%	50%	73,608	
Labour	11	1	4	-3	28%	39%	57,089	
Liberal	5	0	0	0	13%	4.8%	6,996	
Protestant	2	1	0	+1	5%	4.3%	6,329	
Independent	1	0	1	-1	2.6%	0.77%	1,120	
Democratic Conservative	0	0	0	0	0%	0.59%	860	

== Ward results ==
* - Councillor seeking re-election

Comparisons are made with the 1933 election results.

=== Abercromby ===
No. 9 Abercromby
Party	Candidate	Votes	%	±%
Conservative	William Thomas Roberts *	2,383	51%	
Labour	Alice Elliott	2,245	49%	
Majority		138		
Registered electors		9,829		
Turnout		4,628	47%	
Conservative hold		Swing		

=== Aigburth ===
No. 17 Aigburth
Party	Candidate	Votes	%	±%
Conservative	Edward James Deane *	2,777	60%	
Liberal	Philip Binnes	1,853	40%	
Majority		924		
Registered electors		10,421		
Turnout		4,630	44%	
Conservative hold		Swing		

=== Allerton ===
No. 35 Allerton
Party	Candidate	Votes	%	±%
Conservative	George Alfred Strong *	2,091	80%	
Labour	Charles William Baker	517	20%	
Majority		1,574		
Registered electors		5,424		
Turnout		2,608	48%	
Conservative hold		Swing		

=== Anfield ===
No. 29 Anfield
Party	Candidate	Votes	%	±%
Liberal	Aled Owen Roberts	2,257	85%	
Independent	Robert Hugh Williams	389	15%	
Majority		1,868		
Registered electors		11,285		
Turnout		2,646	23%	
Liberal hold		Swing		

=== Breckfield ===
No. 30 Breckfield
Party	Candidate	Votes	%	±%
Conservative	David John Lewis	2,678	62%	
Labour	James Lakin Jones	1,640	38%	
Majority		1,038		
Registered electors		10,154		
Turnout		4,318	43%	
Conservative hold		Swing		

=== Brunswick ===
No. 11 Brunswick
Party	Candidate	Votes	%	±%
Labour	Thomas Hanley *	unopposed		
Registered electors				
Labour hold		Swing		

=== Castle Street ===
No. 7 Castle Street
Party	Candidate	Votes	%	±%
Liberal	William Sinclair Scott Hannay	unopposed		
Registered electors				
Liberal hold		Swing		

=== Childwall ===
No. 38 Childwall
Party	Candidate	Votes	%	±%
Liberal	Alan Anderson Boyle *	unopposed		
Registered electors				
Liberal hold		Swing		

=== Croxteth ===
No. 40 Croxteth
Party	Candidate	Votes	%	±%
Labour	Mary Lilian Hamilton *	4,374	61%	
Conservative	Mary Edith Barbara Whittingham-Jones	2,833	39%	
Majority		1,541		
Registered electors		19,367		
Turnout		7,207	37%	
Labour hold		Swing		

=== Dingle ===
No. 12 Dingle
Party	Candidate	Votes	%	±%
Conservative	George Horrace Duckett	4,480	50%	
Labour	Joseph Gibbins *	4,393	50%	
Majority		87		
Registered electors		14,930		
Turnout		8,873	59%	
Conservative gain from Labour		Swing		

=== Edge Hill ===
No. 18 Edge Hill
Party	Candidate	Votes	%	±%
Labour	James Johnstone *	2.908	52%	
Conservative	Bertram Saul Morgan	2,675	48%	
Majority		233		
Registered electors		12,274		
Turnout		5,583	45%	
Labour hold		Swing		

=== Everton ===
No. 21 Everton
Party	Candidate	Votes	%	±%
Labour	Bertie Kirby *	3,530	64%	
Conservative	George Gilbert Mulligan	1,970	36%	
Majority		1,560		
Registered electors		12,570		
Turnout		5,500	44%	
Labour hold		Swing		

=== Exchange ===
No. 5 Exchange
Party	Candidate	Votes	%	±%
Independent	James Farrell *	731	71%	
Labour	Hugh Carr	304	29%	
Majority		427		
Registered electors		2,332		
Turnout		1,035	44%	
Independent hold		Swing		

=== Fairfield ===
No. 31 Fairfield
Party	Candidate	Votes	%	±%
Liberal	Charles Menlove Dolby	2,239	65%	
Labour	Thomas Dolman Vallance	1,231	35%	
Majority		1,008		
Registered electors		10,470		
Turnout		3,470	33%	
Liberal hold		Swing		

=== Fazakerley ===
No. 27 Fazakerley
Party	Candidate	Votes	%	±%
Conservative	William Greenough Gregson *	3,077	62%	
Labour	Leonard Cunningham	1,919	38%	
Majority		1,158		
Registered electors		11,992		
Turnout		4,996	42%	
Conservative hold		Swing		

=== Garston ===
No. 37 Garston
Party	Candidate	Votes	%	±%
Labour	Joseph Jackson Cleary *	2,963	60%	
Conservative	Joseph Williams	1,973	40%	
Majority		990		
Registered electors		7,960		
Turnout		4,936	62%	
Labour hold		Swing		

=== Granby ===
No. 14 Granby
Party	Candidate	Votes	%	±%
Conservative	William Adam Edwards *	2,201	53%	
Labour	George Edward Humphreys	1,953	47%	
Majority		248		
Registered electors		9,774		
Turnout		4,154	43%	
Conservative hold		Swing		

=== Great George ===
No. 10 Great George
Party	Candidate	Votes	%	±%
Labour	Joseph Campbell *	1,220	56%	
Conservative	William Henry Broad	965	44%	
Majority		255		
Registered electors		4,563		
Turnout		2,185	48%	
Labour hold		Swing		

=== Kensington ===
No. 19 Kensington
Party	Candidate	Votes	%	±%
Conservative	Jack Cresswell	3,152	66%	
Labour	Cyril George Prest	1,660	34%	
Majority		1,492		
Registered electors		10,954		
Turnout		4,812	44%	
Conservative hold		Swing		

=== Kirkdale ===
No. 24 Kirkdale
Party	Candidate	Votes	%	±%
Conservative	Arthur Mackson Brown	3,844	53%	
Labour	Frederick Jones *	3,383	47%	
Majority		461		
Registered electors		16,419		
Turnout		7,227	44%	
Conservative gain from Labour		Swing		

=== Low Hill ===
No. 20 Low Hill
Party	Candidate	Votes	%	±%
Conservative	Samuel Cecil Saltmarsh	3,055	57%	
Labour	Alexander Kay *	2,265	43%	
Majority		790		
Registered electors		10,780		
Turnout		5,320		
Conservative gain from Labour		Swing		

=== Much Woolton ===
No. 36 Much Woolton
Party	Candidate	Votes	%	±%
Conservative	Joseph Butterfield *	1,104	77%	
Labour	William Smith Fraser	331	23%	
Majority		773		
Registered electors		2,828		
Turnout		1,435	51%	
Conservative hold		Swing		

=== Netherfield ===
No. 22 Netherfield
Party	Candidate	Votes	%	±%
Protestant	Robert Bradley	3,493	56%	
Labour	John Bagot *	2,692	44%	
Majority		801		
Registered electors		11,023		
Turnout		6,185	56%	
Protestant gain from Labour		Swing		

=== North Scotland ===
No. 2 North Scotland
Party	Candidate	Votes	%	±%
Labour	Frederick William Tucker *	unopposed		
Registered electors				
Labour hold		Swing		

=== Old Swan ===
No. 32 Old Swan
Party	Candidate	Votes	%	±%
Conservative	Moss Greenberg *	4,428	59%	
Labour	Joseph Strathdene	3,118	41%	
Majority		1,310		
Registered electors		18,486		
Turnout		7,546	41%	
Conservative hold		Swing		

=== Prince's Park ===
No. 13 Prince's Park
Party	Candidate	Votes	%	±%
Conservative	David Rowan	2,896	58%	
Labour	Sarah Ann Demain	2,079	42%	
Majority		817		
Registered electors		9,811		
Turnout		4,975	51%	
Conservative hold		Swing		

=== Sandhills ===
No. 1 Sandhills
Party	Candidate	Votes	%	±%
Labour	John Wolfe Tone Morrissey *	unopposed		
Registered electors				
Labour hold		Swing		

=== St. Anne's ===
No. 6 St. Anne's
Party	Candidate	Votes	%	±%
Labour	Bessie Braddock *	unopposed		
Registered electors				
Labour hold		Swing		

=== St. Domingo ===
No. 23 St. Domingo
Party	Candidate	Votes	%	±%
Protestant	George Henry Dunbar *	2,836	63%	
Labour	Sarah Anne McArd	1,686	37%	
Majority		1,150		
Registered electors		11,166		
Turnout		4,522	40%	
Protestant hold		Swing		

=== St. Peter's ===
No. 8 St. Peter's
Party	Candidate	Votes	%	±%
Liberal	Mary Mabel Ellis *	647	62%	
Labour	Laurence William Kennan	393	38%	
Majority		254		
Registered electors		2,455		
Turnout		1,040	42%	
Liberal hold		Swing		

=== Sefton Park East ===
No. 15 Sefton Park East
Party	Candidate	Votes	%	±%
Conservative	Eric Douglas Mackay Heriot-Hill	2,104	56%	
Democratic Conservative	George Edward Holme *	860	23%	
Labour	George Porter	793	21%	
Majority		1,244		
Registered electors		8,782		
Turnout		3,757	43%	
Conservative hold		Swing		

=== Sefton Park West ===
No. 16 Sefton Park West
Party	Candidate	Votes	%	±%
Conservative	Walter Thomas Lancashire *	2,426	76%	
Labour	Geoffrey Thompson	782	24%	
Majority		1,644		
Registered electors		6,713		
Turnout		3,208	48%	
Conservative hold		Swing		

=== South Scotland ===
No. 3 South Scotland
Party	Candidate	Votes	%	±%
Labour	Michael John Reppion *	unopposed		
Registered electors		8,308		
Labour hold		Swing		

=== Vauxhall ===
No. 4 Vauxhall
Party	Candidate	Votes	%	±%
Labour	Thomas Hogan	1,057	64%	
Conservative	James Arthur Bryning	588	36%	
Majority		469		
Registered electors		3,556		
Turnout		1,645	46%	
Labour gain from Independent		Swing		

=== Walton ===
No. 25 Walton
Party	Candidate	Votes	%	±%
Conservative	Robert John Hall *	4,581	70%	
Labour	Alfred Walker Boothman	1,946	30%	
Majority		2,635		
Registered electors		16,451		
Turnout		6,527	40%	
Conservative hold		Swing		

=== Warbreck ===
No. 26 Warbreck
Party	Candidate	Votes	%	±%
Conservative	Hugh Wagstaff *	3,350	74%	
Labour	Austin Rainford	956	21%	
Independent	William Fry	213	5%	
Majority		2,394		
Registered electors		13,219		
Turnout		4,519	34%	
Conservative hold		Swing		

=== Wavertree ===
No. 34 Wavertree
Party	Candidate	Votes	%	±%
Conservative	John Morris Griffith *	4,184	75%	
Labour	Daniel Whelan	1,421	25%	
Majority		2,763		
Registered electors		15,498		
Turnout		5,605	36%	
Conservative hold		Swing		

=== Wavertree West ===
No. 33 Wavertree West
Party	Candidate	Votes	%	±%
Conservative	Alfred Levy *	2,433	61%	
Labour	Thomas Williamson	1,548	39%	
Majority		885		
Registered electors		8,788		
Turnout		3,981	45%	
Conservative hold		Swing		

=== West Derby ===
No. 28 West Derby
Party	Candidate	Votes	%	±%
Conservative	Ernest Ash Cookson *	5,360	75%	
Labour	Mabel Kennedy	1,782	25%	
Majority		3,578		
Registered electors		20,446		
Turnout		7,142	35%	
Conservative hold		Swing		

== Aldermanic Elections ==
=== Aldermanic Election 6 January 1937 ===
Caused by the death on 1 December 1936 of Alderman Patrick Jeremiah Kelly (Independent, last elected by the councillors as an alderman on 9 November 1932, in whose place Councillor Lawrence King (Labour, elected 1 November 1935) was elected as an alderman by the councillors on 6 January 1937.

Aldermanic Election 6 January 1937
Party	Candidate	Votes	%	Allocated ward
Labour	Councillor Lawrence King	42	100%	No. 27 Fazakerley

The term of office to expire on 9 November 1938.

=== Aldermanic Election 3 February 1937 ===
Caused by the resignation of Alderman Anthony Shelmerdine (Conservative, elected 9 November 1932), in whose place Councillor Michael Cory Dixon (Conservative, elected 1 November 1935) being elected as an alderman on 3 February 1937.

Aldermanic Election 3 February 1937
Party	Candidate	Votes	%	Allocated ward
Conservative	Councillor Michael Cory Dixon	58	100%	No.16 Sefton Park West

The term of office to expire on 9 November 1938.

=== Aldermanic Election 6 October 1937 ===
Caused by the death on 7 September 1937 of Alderman Henry Walker (Labour, last elected as an alderman on 9 November 1935). His place was taken by Councillor John Wolfe Tone Morrissey JP (Labour, last elected to the Sandhills ward on 1 November 1936) of 17 Haverstock Road, Fairfield, Liverpool, who was elected by the councillors as an alderman on 6 October 1937.

Aldermanic Election 6 October 1937
Party	Candidate	Votes	%	Allocated ward
Labour	Councillor John Wolfe Tone Morrissey	35	100%	No. 33 Wavertree West

The term of office to expire on 9 November 1941.

== By-elections ==
=== No. 33 Wavertree West, Wednesday 27 January 1937 ===
Caused by the resignation of Councillor Charlton Thomson (Conservative, elected 1 November 1935).

No. 34 Wavertree
Party	Candidate	Votes	%	±%
	Dinsdale Walker	1,598	58%	
	Robert Edward Cottier	783	29%	
	Theodolph Joseph Augustus Duggan	363	13%	
Majority		815		
Registered electors		15,498		
Turnout		2,744	18%	
		Swing		

The term of office to expire on 1 November 1938.

=== No.11 Brunswick, 11 February 1937 ===
Following the death on 1 December 1936 of Alderman Patrick Jeremiah Kelly (Independent, last elected by the councillors as an alderman on 9 November 1932, in whose place Councillor Lawrence King (Labour, elected 1 November 1935) was elected as an alderman by the councillors on 6 January 1937.

No. 11 Brunswick
Party	Candidate	Votes	%	±%
	Annie Cain *	unopposed		
		Swing		

The term of office to expire on 1 November 1938.

=== No.15 Sefton Park East, 17 March 1937 ===
Caused by Councillor Michael Cory Dixon (Conservative, elected 1 November 1935) being elected as an alderman on 3 February 1937.

No. 15 Sefton Park East
Party	Candidate	Votes	%	±%
Conservative	John Moores	1,494	85%	
	James Murphy	274	15%	
Majority		1,244		
Registered electors		8,782		
Turnout		1,768	20%	
Conservative hold		Swing		

The term of office to expire on 1 November 1938.

=== No. 14 Granby, Thursday 17 June 1937 ===
Caused by the death on 28 April 1937 of Councillor William Adam Edwards (Conservative, last elected 1 November 1936)

No. 14 Granby
Party	Candidate	Votes	%	±%
	Walter Clark	1,635		
	John Bagot	1,479		
Majority				
Registered electors		9,774		
Turnout				
		Swing		

=== No. 40 Croxteth, Thursday 17 June 1937 ===
Caused by the resignation of Councillor Mrs. Mary Lilian Hamilton (Labour, last elected 1 November 1936).

No. 40 Croxteth
Party	Candidate	Votes	%	±%
Labour	James Lakin Jones	3,331	66%	
Conservative	Miss Mary Edith Barbara Whittingham-Jones	1,727	34%	
Majority		1,604		
Registered electors		19,367		
Turnout		5,058	26%	
Labour hold		Swing		

The term of office to expire on 1 November 1939.

=== No. 19 Kensington, Thursday 22 July 1937 ===
Caused by the death on 28 June 1937 of Councillor Edward Clouston Ralph Litler-Jones (Conservative, elected 1 November 1935.

No. 19 Kensington
Party	Candidate	Votes	%	±%
Conservative	Frederick Harold Bailey	2,093	67%	
	George Williams	1,018	33%	
Majority		1,075		
Registered electors		10,954		
Turnout		3,111	28%	
Conservative hold		Swing		

== See also ==
- Liverpool City Council
- Liverpool Town Council elections 1835 - 1879
- Liverpool City Council elections 1880–present
- Mayors and Lord Mayors of Liverpool 1207 to present
- History of local government in England
