= 1899 Liverpool City Council election =

English local election

- November 1, 1899

32 seats were up for election: one seat for each of the 28 existing wards and 3 seats for the new Sefton Park East ward 59 (incl. Aldermen) seats needed for a majority

Elections to Liverpool City Council were held on Thursday 1 November 1899. One third of the council seats were up for election, the term of office of each councillor being three years.

Eleven of the thirty-one seats (29 wards, with a new ward of Sefton Park East electing three new councillors) were uncontested.

After the election, the composition of the council was:

Party	Councillors	±	Aldermen	Total
Conservative	??	+1	??	??
Liberal	??	+2	??	??
Irish Nationalist	??	0	??	??
Independent Irish Nationalist	??	+1	??	??
Liberal Unionist	??	+1	??	??
Independent	??	??	??	??

== Election result ==
Liverpool local election result 1899
Party	Seats	Gains	Losses	Net gain/loss	Seats %	Votes %	Votes	+/−
Conservative	16	2	1	+1	52.0	51.7	13,739	
Liberal	11	4	2	+2	35.0	36.5	9,692	
Irish Nationalist	2	1	1	0	6.5			
Independent Irish Nationalist	1	1	0	+1	3.2	3.5	929	
Liberal Unionist	1	1	0	+1	3.2			
Independent Liberal	0				0.0	3.8	1,002	
Labour Repr. Cmte.	0				0.0	2.1	549	
Ind. Conservative	0				0.0	1.5	399	
Independent	0				0.0	1.0	279	

== Ward results ==
* - Retiring Councillor seeking re-election

Comparisons are made with the 1896 election results, as the retiring councillors were elected in that year.

=== Abercromby ===
No. 21 Abercromby
Party	Candidate	Votes	%	±%
Conservative	Morris Paterson Jones *	844	53%	
Liberal	Dr. William Permewan	741	46%	
Independent	John O'Brien	15	0.94%	
Majority		103		
Registered electors		2,983		
Turnout		1,600	54%	
Conservative hold		Swing		

=== Breckfield ===
No. 6 Breckfield
Party	Candidate	Votes	%	±%
Conservative	Louis Samuel Cohen *	unopposed		
Registered electors				
Conservative hold		Swing		

=== Brunswick ===
No. 25 Brunswick
Party	Candidate	Votes	%	±%
Liberal	Thomas Roberts	1,031	52%	
Conservative	Roderick Killip	969	48%	
Majority		62		
Registered electors		3,157		
Turnout		2,000	63%	
Liberal hold		Swing		

=== Castle Street ===
No. 18 Castle Street
Party	Candidate	Votes	%	±%
Conservative	John Lawrence *	unopposed		
Registered electors				
Conservative hold		Swing		

=== Dingle ===
No. 26 Dingle
Party	Candidate	Votes	%	±%
Conservative	William Roberts *	1,761	64%	
Independent Liberal	Thomas Byrne	1,002	36%	
Majority		759		
Registered electors		5,402		
Turnout		2,763	51%	
Conservative hold		Swing		

=== Edge Hill ===
No. 12 Edge Hill
Party	Candidate	Votes	%	±%
Conservative	Samuel Wasse Higginbottom *	Unopposed	N/A	N/A
Registered electors				
Conservative hold				

=== Everton ===
No. 9 Everton
Party	Candidate	Votes	%	±%
Liberal	William Denton *	977	71%	
Ind. Conservative	David John Williams	399	29%	
Majority		578		
Registered electors		4,706		
Turnout		1,376	29%	
Liberal hold		Swing		

=== Exchange ===
No. 16 Exchange
Party	Candidate	Votes	%	±%
Liberal	Edmond Brownbill *	unopposed		
Registered electors				
Liberal hold		Swing		

=== Fairfield ===
No. 4 Fairfield
Party	Candidate	Votes	%	±%
Conservative	Frank John Leslie *	713	59%	
Liberal	John Henry Evans	495	41%	
Majority		218		
Registered electors		3,512		
Turnout		1,208	34%	
Conservative hold		Swing		

=== Granby ===
No. 22 Granby
Party	Candidate	Votes	%	±%
Liberal	John Lea *	unopposed		
Registered electors				
Liberal hold		Swing		

=== Great George ===
No. 20 Great George
Party	Candidate	Votes	%	±%
Liberal	John Lamport Ellis *	unopposed		
Registered electors				
Liberal hold		Swing		

=== Kensington ===
No. 11 Kensington
Party	Candidate	Votes	%	±%
Conservative	William Henry Edwardes *	1,418	65%	
Liberal	William Benjamin Lewis	760	35%	
Majority		658		
Registered electors		4,307		
Turnout		2,178	51%	
Conservative hold		Swing		

=== Kirkdale ===
No. 2 Kirkdale
Party	Candidate	Votes	%	±%
Conservative	Dr. John Utting	1,803	57%	
Liberal	Thomas Backhouse	1,352	43%	
Majority		451		
Registered electors		6,361		
Turnout		3,155	50%	
Conservative hold		Swing		

=== Low Hill ===
No. 10 Low Hill
Party	Candidate	Votes	%	±%
Conservative	Charles Stewart Dean *	1,216	80%	
Liberal and Labour	Clement William George	301	20%	
Majority		915		
Registered electors		4,153		
Turnout		1,517	37%	
Conservative hold		Swing		

=== Netherfield ===
No. 8 Netherfield
Party	Candidate	Votes	%	±%
Conservative	William Watson Rutherford *	unopposed		
Registered electors				
Conservative hold		Swing		

=== North Scotland ===
No. 13 North Scotland
Party	Candidate	Votes	%	±%
Irish Nationalist	Dr. Alexander Murray Bligh	unopposed		
Irish Nationalist hold		Swing		

=== North Walton ===
No. 27 North Walton
Party	Candidate	Votes	%	±%
Conservative	Peter McGuffie *	1,018	65%	
Labour	Alexander McLaren	549	35%	
Majority		469		
Registered electors		3,689		
Turnout		1,567	42%	
Conservative hold		Swing		

=== Prince's Park ===
No. 23 Prince's Park
Party	Candidate	Votes	%	±%
Conservative	Walter William Thomas *	unopposed		
Registered electors				
Conservative hold		Swing		

=== Sandhills ===
No. 1 Sandhills
Party	Candidate	Votes	%	±%
Irish Nationalist	Patrick Joseph Deery *	550	90%	
Independent	John McGrath	59	10%	
Majority		491		
Registered electors		3,461		
Turnout		609	18%	
Irish Nationalist gain from Liberal		Swing		

=== St. Anne's ===
No. 17 St. Anne's
Party	Candidate	Votes	%	±%
Conservative	Frederick Saunby	1,022	51%	
Liberal	John Clancy	903	45%	
Independent	Michael Conway	58	3%	
Independent	Thomas Hart	11	0.55%	
Independent	Edward Phillips	3	0.15%	
Majority		119		
Registered electors		3,401		
Turnout		1,997	59%	
Conservative gain from Liberal		Swing		

=== St. Domingo ===
No. 7 St. Domingo
Party	Candidate	Votes	%	±%
Conservative	Joseph Bennett Colton *	unopposed		
Registered electors				
Conservative hold		Swing		

=== St. Peter's ===
No. 19 St. Peter's
Party	Candidate	Votes	%	±%
Liberal	Samuel Hough *	unopposed		
Registered electors				
Liberal hold		Swing		

=== Sefton Park East ===
No. 24A Sefton Park East - 3 seats
Party	Candidate	Votes	%	±%
Liberal	John Japp	unopposed		
Liberal	John Morris	unopposed		
Conservative	Lt. Col. Robert Stephen Porter	unopposed		
Registered electors				
Liberal win (new seat)				
Liberal win (new seat)				
Conservative win (new seat)				

=== Sefton Park West ===
No. 24 Sefton Park West
Party	Candidate	Votes	%	±%
Conservative	Richard Dart *	unopposed		
Registered electors				
Conservative hold		Swing		

=== South Scotland ===
No. 14 South Scotland
Party	Candidate	Votes	%	±%
Independent Irish Nationalist	Austin Harford	929	65%	
Irish Nationalist	James Fitzpatrick	510	35%	
Majority		419		
Registered electors		3,329		
Turnout		1,439	43%	
Independent Irish Nationalist gain from Irish Nationalist				

=== South Walton ===
No. 27 South Walton
Party	Candidate	Votes	%	±%
Liberal	William Evans	1,061	51%	
Conservative	George Brodrick Smith-Brodrick	1,034	49%	
Majority		27		
Registered electors		3,971		
Turnout		2,095	53%	
Liberal gain from Conservative		Swing		

=== Vauxhall ===
No. 15 Vauxhall
Party	Candidate	Votes	%	±%
Liberal	Richard Robert Meade-King *	396	74%	
Independent	John Hughes	136	26%	
Majority		260		
Registered electors		2,080		
Turnout		532	26%	
Liberal hold		Swing		

=== Wavertree ===
No. 5 Wavertree
Party	Candidate	Votes	%	±%
Liberal Unionist	James Willcox Alsop	1,026	59%	
Liberal	Ebenezer Thompson	712	41%	
Majority		314		
Registered electors		3,359		
Turnout		1,738	52%	
Liberal Unionist gain from Liberal		Swing		

=== West Derby ===
No. 28 West Derby
Party	Candidate	Votes	%	±%
Liberal	Dr. Thomas Utley	963	51%	
Conservative	William Craigie Williams *	915	49%	
Majority		48		
Registered electors		3,189		
Turnout		1,878	59%	
Liberal gain from Conservative		Swing		

== By-elections ==
=== No. 24 Sefton Park West, November 1899 ===
The resignation of Councillor Francis Henderson (Conservative, Sefton Park West, elected 1 November 1898) was reported to the Council on 9 November 1899 .

No. 24 Sefton Park West
Party	Candidate	Votes	%	±%
Conservative	Thomas Stanley Rogerson	Unopposed	N/A	N/A
Registered electors		3,189		
Conservative hold				

=== No. 17, St. Anne's, November 1899 ===
The resignation of Councillor Jacob Reuben Grant (Liberal, St. Anne's, elected 1 November 1897) was reported to the Council on 9 November 1899 .

No. 17 St. Anne's
Party	Candidate	Votes	%	±%
Liberal	George King	558	96%	
	William Saxton	18	3.1%	
	Thomas Hart	8	1.4%	
Majority		540		
Registered electors		3,401		
Turnout		584	17%	
Liberal hold		Swing		

=== No.19, St. Peter's, November 1899 ===
The resignation of Alderman Henry Hugh Hornby (Liberal Unionist, elected by the council 9 November 1898) was reported to the Council on 9 November 1899 .

Councillor William Henry Watts (Liberal, St. Peter's, elected 1897) was elected as an alderman by the council on 9 November 1899.

No. 19 St. Peter's
Party	Candidate	Votes	%	±%
Liberal	William Crosfield	499	96%	
	Thomas Hill Joseph	22	4.2%	
Majority		477		
Registered electors				
Turnout		521		
Liberal hold		Swing		

=== No.23 Prince's Park, November 1899 ===
On the addition of No. 24a Sefton Park East ward, Councillor William James Burgess (Conservative, Prince's Park, elected 1 November 1897) was elected as an alderman by the council on 9 November 1899.

No. 23 Prince's Park
Party	Candidate	Votes	%	±%
Conservative	Harild Chaloner Dowdall	Unopposed	N/A	N/A
Registered electors				
Conservative hold		Swing		

=== No. 4, Fairfield ward, 15 May 1900 ===
Caused by the resignation of Councillor Frank John Leslie (Conservative, Fairfield, elected 1 November 1899).

No. 4 Fairfield
Party	Candidate	Votes	%	±%
	William Craigie Williams	720	59%	
	John Henry Evans	495	41%	
Majority		218		
Registered electors				
Turnout		1,215		
		Swing		

== See also ==
- Liverpool City Council
- Liverpool Town Council elections 1835 - 1879
- Liverpool City Council elections 1880–present
- Mayors and Lord Mayors of Liverpool 1207 to present
- History of local government in England
