= Breckfield (ward) =

Former electoral district of Liverpool

- Breckfield ward (1980) within Liverpool
- Registered Electors: 7,162 (2021 election)
- Metropolitan borough: City of Liverpool
- Metropolitan county: Merseyside
- Region: North West
- Country: England
- Sovereign state: United Kingdom
- UK Parliament: Liverpool Walton

Breckfield ward was an electoral district of Liverpool City Council from 1895 until 2004. It was part of the Everton and Anfield districts of Liverpool.

== Background ==
=== 1895 boundaries ===
The ward was created from parts of the Everton and Kirkdale wards and was within the Liverpool Kirkdale Parliamentary constituency.

=== 1953 boundaries ===
1953 boundaries

=== 1980 boundaries ===
A report of the Local Government Boundary Commission for England published in November 1978 set out proposals for changes to the wards of Liverpool City Council, maintaining the number of councillors at 99 representing 33 wards. Breckfield ward was retained and was represented by three councillors.

The report describes the boundaries of Breckfield ward as "Commencing at a point where Aubrey Street meets Everton Road, thence northwestwards along said road and Heyworth Street to Grecian Terrace, thence southwestwards along said terrace and Havelock Street to Netherfield Road North, thence northwestwards along said road and continuing northwestwards along the eastern boundary of Vauxhall Ward to the southwestern boundary of Melrose Ward, thence northeastwards along said boundary to Anfield Road, thence southeast wards along said road to Back Rockfield Road, thence southeastwards along said road to a point opposite the rear boundaries of Nos 24-2 Lake Street, thence southwestwards along said boundaries to a point opposite the rear boundary of the Public House (No 185), in Walton Breck Road, thence southeastwards to and along said boundary and southwestwards along the eastern boundary of said Public House to Walton Breck Road, thence southeastwards along said road to Oakfield Road, thence southeastwards along said road and Belmont Road to Whitefield Road, thence southwestwards along said road to and southwestwards along the unnamed road north of Prince Rupert County Primary School to Whitefield Way, thence continuing southwestwards along said way, crossing Queen's Road and continuing southwestwards in a straight line to the junction of Hodson Place and Margaret Street, thence southwards along said street to Aubrey Street, thence southwestwards along said street to the point of commencement".

Until 1983 the ward was within the Liverpool Kirkdale Parliamentary constituency and afterwards the Liverpool Walton Parliamentary constituency.

=== 2004 elections ===
A report of the Local Government Boundary Commission published in March 2003 recommended the number of wards in the city be reduced to 30 and the number of councillors reduced to 90. The Breckfield ward was dissolved and distributed into the re-arranged Everton and Anfield wards.

== Councillors ==
Election	Councillor	Councillor	Councillor
1895	Louis Samuel Cohen (Con)	William Hall Walker (Con)	George Hampson Morrisson (Con)
1896	Louis Samuel Cohen (Con)	William Hall Walker (Con)	George Hampson Morrisson (Con)
1897	Louis Samuel Cohen (Con)	William Hall Walker (Con)	George Hampson Morrisson (Con)
1898	Louis Samuel Cohen (Con)	William Hall Walker (Con)	Edwin Berry (Con)
1899	Louis Samuel Cohen (Con)	William Hall Walker (Con)	Edwin Berry (Con)
1900	Louis Samuel Cohen (Con)	John Duncan (Con)	Edwin Berry (Con)
1901	Louis Samuel Cohen (Con)	John Duncan (Con)	Edwin Berry (Con)
1902	Louis Samuel Cohen (Con)	John Duncan (Con)	Edwin Berry (Con)
1903	Louis Samuel Cohen (Con)	John Duncan (Con)	Edwin Berry (Con)
1904	Louis Samuel Cohen (Con)	William Herbert Priest (Con)	Edwin Berry (Con)
1905	Louis Samuel Cohen (Con)	William Herbert Priest (Con)	Edwin Berry (Con)
1906	Louis Samuel Cohen (Con)	William Herbert Priest (Con)	Edwin Berry (Con)
1907	Frank John Leslie (Con)	William Herbert Priest (Con)	Louis Samuel Cohen (Con)
1908	Frank John Leslie (Con)	William Herbert Priest (Con)	Louis Samuel Cohen (Con)
1909	Frank John Leslie (Con)	William Herbert Priest (Con)	Louis Samuel Cohen (Con)
1910	Frank John Leslie (Con)	William Herbert Priest (Con)	William Rudd (Con)
1911	Frank John Leslie (Con)	William Herbert Priest (Con)	William Rudd (Con)
1912	Frank John Leslie (Con)	Alfred Griffiths (Con)	William Rudd (Con)
1913	Edward Powell (Con)	Alfred Griffiths (Con)	William Rudd (Con)
1914	Edward Powell (Con)	Alfred Griffiths (Con)	William Rudd (Con)
1919	Edward Powell (Con)	Henry Alfred Booth (Lab)	William Rudd (Con)
1920	Edward Powell (Con)	Henry Alfred Booth (Lab)	Alfred Griffiths (Con)
1921	Thomas Henry Burton (Con)	Henry Alfred Booth (Lab)	Alfred Griffiths (Con)
1922	Thomas Henry Burton (Con)	Edward James Jones (Con)	Alfred Griffiths (Con)
1923	Thomas Henry Burton (Con)	Edward James Jones (Con)	Alfred Griffiths (Con)
1924	Thomas Henry Burton (Con)	Edward James Jones (Con)	Alfred Griffiths (Con)
1925	Thomas Henry Burton (Con)	Edward James Jones (Con)	Alfred Griffiths (Con)
1925	Thomas Henry Burton (Con)	Edward James Jones (Con)	Harry Longbottom (Protestant)^{[d]}
1926	Thomas Henry Burton (Con)	Edward James Jones (Con)	Herbert Edward Rose (Lab)
1927	Thomas Henry Burton (Con)	Edward James Jones (Con)	Herbert Edward Rose (Lab)
1928	Thomas Henry Burton (Con)	Edward James Jones (Con)	Herbert Edward Rose (Lab)
1929	Thomas Henry Burton (Con)	Edward James Jones (Con)	Herbert Edward Rose (Lab)
1930	Thomas Henry Burton (Con)	Edward James Jones (Con)	Herbert Edward Rose (Lab)
1931	Thomas Henry Burton (Con)	Henry James Pearson jr. (Con)	Ada Martha Burton (Con)
1932	Thomas Henry Burton (Con)	Henry James Pearson jr. (Con)	Ada Martha Burton (Con)
1933	Thomas Henry Burton (Con)	Henry James Pearson jr. (Con)	Ada Martha Burton (Con)
1934	Thomas Henry Burton (Con)	Henry James Pearson jr. (Con)	Ada Martha Burton (Con)
1935	Thomas Henry Burton (Con)	Henry James Pearson jr. (Con)	Ada Martha Burton (Con)
1936	David John Lewis (Con)	Henry James Pearson jr. (Con)	Ada Martha Burton (Con)
1937	David John Lewis (Con)	George William Prout (Con)	Ada Martha Burton (Con)
1938	David John Lewis (Con)	George William Prout (Con)	Ada Martha Burton (Con)
1945	David John Lewis (Con)	George William Prout (Con)	Ada Martha Burton (Con)
1946	David John Lewis (Con)	George William Prout (Con)	Thomas Henry Thompson (Con)
1947	David John Lewis (Con)	George William Prout (Con)	David Jean Lewis (Con)
1949	Thomas Henry Thompson (Con)	George William Prout (Con)	David Jean Lewis (Con)
1950	Thomas Henry Thompson (Con)	George William Prout (Con)	David Jean Lewis (Con)
1951	Thomas Henry Thompson (Con)	George William Prout (Con)	David Jean Lewis (Con)
1952	William Ralph Snell (Lab)	Samuel Curtis (Con)	William Bell Pickett (Con)
1953	J. S. Ross (Con)	William Bell Pickett (Con)	Samuel Curtis (Con)
1954	J. Cullen (Lab)	William Bell Pickett (Con)	Samuel Curtis (Con)
1955	J. Cullen (Lab)	S. E. Goldsmith (Con)	Samuel Curtis (Con)
1956	J. Cullen (Lab)	S. E. Goldsmith (Con)	S. Airey (Con)
1957	W. A. Lowe (Con)	S. E. Goldsmith (Con)	S. Airey (Con)
1958	W. A. Lowe (Con)	J. Mottram (Lab)	S. Airey (Con)
1959	W. A. Lowe (Con)	J. Mottram (Lab)	S. Airey (Con)
1960	W. A. Lowe (Con)	J. Mottram (Lab)	S. Airey (Con)
1961	W. A. Lowe (Con)	F. Parry (Con)	S. Airey (Con)
1962	W. A. Lowe (Con)	F. Parry (Con)	J. E. Burns (Lab)
1963	L. Williams (Lab)	F. Parry (Con)	J. E. Burns (Lab)
1964	L. Williams (Lab)	A. Williams (Lab)	J. E. Burns (Lab)
1965	L. Williams (Lab)	A. Williams (Lab)	John K. Tanner (Con)
1966	L. Williams (Lab)	A. Williams (Lab)	John K. Tanner (Con)
1967	L. Williams (Lab)	Kenneth B. Jacques (Con)	John K. Tanner (Con)
1968	L. Williams (Lab)	Kenneth B. Jacques (Con)	John K. Tanner (Con)
1969	Michael W. Maxwell (Con)	Kenneth B. Jacques (Con)	John K. Tanner (Con)
1970	Michael W. Maxwell (Con)	Kenneth B. Jacques (Con)	John K. Tanner (Con)
1971	Michael W. Maxwell (Con)	Kenneth B. Jacques (Con)	L. Williams (Lab)
1972	T. Roberts (Lab)	Kenneth B. Jacques (Con)	L. Williams (Lab)
1973	F. McNevin (Lib)	D. J. Hartley (Lib)	B.B. Chivall (Lib)
1975	F. McNevin (Lib)	D. J. Hartley (Lib)	B. B. Chivall (Lib)
1976	F. McNevin (Lib)	J. Connolly (Lab)	B. B. Chivall (Lib)
1978	F. McNevin (Lib)	J. Connolly (Lab)	D. Croft (Lib)
1979	F. McNevin (Lib)	J. Connolly (Lab)	D. Croft (Lib)
1980	William Roberts (Lib)	Frank McNevin (Lib)	D. Croft (Lib)
1982	William Roberts (Lib)	Frank McNevin (Lib)	D. Croft (Lib)
1983	William Roberts (Lib)	John McIntosh (Lab)	D. Croft (Lib)
1984	William Roberts (Lib)	John McIntosh (Lab)	Steve Ellison (Lab)
1986	J. Brazier (Lab)	John McIntosh (Lab)	P. Skinley (Lab)
1987	J. Brazier (Lab)	W. Lane (Lab)	P. Skinley (Lab)
1988	J. Brazier (Lab)	W. Lane (Lab)	Mary McGiveron (Lab)
1990	Frank Prendergast (Lab)	W. Lane (Lab)	Mary McGiveron (Lab)
1991	Frank Prendergast (Lab)	Alan Dean (Lab)	Mary McGiveron (Lab)
1992	Frank Prendergast (Lab)	Alan Dean (Lab)	Mary McGiveron (Lab)
1994	Frank Prendergast (Lab)	Alan Dean (Lab)	Mary McGiveron (Lab)
1995	Frank Prendergast (Lab)	John McIntosh (Lab)	Mary McGiveron (Lab)
1996	Frank Prendergast (Lab)	John McIntosh (Lab)	Mary McGiveron (Lab)
1998	Frank Prendergast (Lab)	John McIntosh (Lab)	Mary McGiveron (Lab)
1999	Frank Prendergast (Lab)	John McIntosh (Lab)	Mary McGiveron (Lab)
2000	Frank Prendergast (Lab)	John McIntosh (Lab)	Harry Jones (LD)
2002	Frank Prendergast (Lab)	John McIntosh (Lab)	Harry Jones (LD)
2003	Frank Prendergast (Lab)	John McIntosh (Lab)	Harry Jones (LD)

indicates seat up for re-election after boundary changes.

indicates seat up for re-election.

indicates change in affiliation.

indicates seat up for re-election after casual vacancy.

=== Notes ===
d. Cllr Alfred Griffiths died on 20 October 1925, a by-election was held on 1 December 1925.

== Election results ==
=== Elections of the 2000s ===
Thursday 1 May 2003
Party	Candidate	Votes	%	±%
Labour	John McIntosh	972	66.39	▲2.88
Liberal Democrats	James Gaskell	314	21.45	▼4.96
Liberal	Daniel Wood	178	12.16	▲2.08
Majority		658	44.95	▲7.85
Turnout		1,464	20.44	▼1.21
Registered electors		7,162		
Labour hold		Swing	+3.92	

Thursday 2 May 2002
Party	Candidate	Votes	%	±%
Labour	Frank Prendergast	1,159	63.51	▲18.37
Liberal Democrats	Jeremy Wright	482	26.41	▼20.79
Liberal	Beryl Ackers	184	10.08	▲2.42
Majority		677	37.10	▲35.05
Turnout		1,825	21.65	▲5.29
Registered electors		8,428		
Labour hold		Swing	+19.58	

Thursday 4 May 2000
Party	Candidate	Votes	%	±%
Liberal Democrats	Harry Jones	690	47.20	▲5.11
Labour	Richie Keenan	660	45.14	▼1.85
Liberal	E. Bamford	112	7.66	▼0.31
Majority		30	2.05	▼2.85
Turnout		1,462	16.36	▼4.19
Registered electors		8,937		
Liberal Democrats gain from Labour		Swing	+3.48	

=== Elections of the 1990s ===
Thursday 6 May 1999
Party	Candidate	Votes	%	±%
Labour	John McIntosh	873	46.99	▼4.81
Liberal Democrats	Harry Jones	782	42.09	▲12.42
Liberal	E. Bamford	148	7.97	▲1.43
Socialist Labour	J. Dooher	33	1.78	▼4.69
Ward Labour	K. Wignall	22	1.18	N/A
Majority		91	4.90	▼17.23
Turnout		1,858	20.55	▲5.21
Registered electors		9,075		
Labour hold		Swing	-8.62	

Thursday 7 May 1998
Party	Candidate	Votes	%	±%
Labour	Frank Prendergast	721	51.80	▼14.58
Liberal Democrats	J. Clucas	413	29.67	▲16.05
Liberal	M. Seigar	91	6.54	▼4.87
Socialist Labour	J. Dooher	90	6.47	N/A
Conservative	Ms. E. Bayley	77	5.53	▼0.02
Majority		308	22.13	▼30.62
Turnout		1,392	15.34	▼5.27
Registered electors		9,075		
Labour hold		Swing	-15.32	

Thursday 2 May 1996
Party	Candidate	Votes	%	±%
Labour	Mary McGiveron	1,291	66.38	▼5.88
Liberal Democrats	Karren Afford	265	13.62	▲3.55
Liberal	J. McAllister	222	11.41	▲5.29
Conservative	Ms. E. Bayley	108	5.55	▲0.47
Militant Labour	J. Morris	59	3.03	▼3.44
Majority		1,026	52.75	▼9.44
Turnout		1,945	20.61	▼2.67
Registered electors		9,436		
Labour hold		Swing	-4.72	

Thursday 4 May 1995
Party	Candidate	Votes	%	±%
Labour	John McIntosh	1,607	72.26	▼3.28
Liberal Democrats	Karren Afford	224	10.07	▼7.09
Militant Labour	J. Morris	144	6.47	N/A
Liberal	B. Edwards	136	6.12	N/A
Conservative	Ms. E. Bayley	113	5.08	▼2.22
Majority		1,383	62.19	▲3.81
Turnout		2,224	23.28	▼3.70
Registered electors		9,553		
Labour hold		Swing	+1.90	

Thursday 5 May 1994
Party	Candidate	Votes	%	±%
Labour	Frank Prendergast	2,029	75.54	▲15.03
Liberal Democrats	Karren Afford	461	17.16	▲0.22
Conservative	E. Bayley	196	7.30	▼5.18
Majority		1,568	58.38	▲14.82
Turnout		2,886	26.98	▲5.12
Registered electors		9,954		
Labour hold		Swing	+7.40	

Thursday 7 May 1992
Party	Candidate	Votes	%	±%
Labour	Mary McGiveron	1,382	60.51	▼5.12
Liberal Democrats	F. Crebbin	387	16.94	▼6.93
Conservative	Elizabeth Bayley	285	12.48	▲1.98
Liverpool Independent Labour	H. Chase	230	10.07	N/A
Majority		995	43.56	▲1.81
Turnout		2,284	21.86	▼8.23
Registered electors		10,446		
Labour hold		Swing	+0.90	

Thursday 2 May 1991
Party	Candidate	Votes	%	±%
Labour	Alan Dean	2,081	65.63	▼14.74
Liberal Democrats	C. Cartmel	757	23.87	▲9.45
Conservative	E. Bayley	333	10.50	▲5.29
Majority		1,324	41.75	▼24.20
Turnout		3,171	30.09	▼11.87
Registered electors		10,538		
Labour hold		Swing	-12.10	

Thursday 3 May 1990
Party	Candidate	Votes	%	±%
Labour	Frank Prendergast	3,238	80.37	▲3.16
Liberal Democrats	Karen Afford	581	14.42	▼1.84
Conservative	Elizabeth Bayley	210	5.21	▼1.31
Majority		2,657	65.95	▲5.00
Turnout		4,029	41.96	▲4.93
Registered electors		9,603		
Labour hold		Swing	+2.50	

=== Elections of the 1980s ===
Thursday 5 May 1988
Party	Candidate	Votes	%	±%
Labour	Mary McGiveron	3,148	77.21	▲16.85
SLD	H. Burt	663	16.26	▼7.98
Conservative	Elizabeth Bayley	266	6.52	▲2.82
Majority		2,485	60.95	▲24.80
Turnout		4,077	37.03	▼10.19
Registered electors		11,009		
Labour hold		Swing	+12.42	

Thursday 7 May 1987
Party	Candidate	Votes	%	±%
Labour	W. Lane	3,263	60.36	▲6.73
Alliance	R. C. Littler	1,309	24.24	▼17.36
Independent	S. Bell	634	11.73	N/A
Conservative	Elizabeth Bayley	200	3.70	▼1.10
Majority		1,954	36.15	▲24.08
Turnout		5,406	47.22	▲5.40
Registered electors		11,449		
Labour hold		Swing	12.04	

Thursday 8 May 1986 (Note: A by-election was held alongside the ordinary election. Two members were elected.)
Party	Candidate	Votes	%	±%
Labour	J. Brazier	2,538	53.63	▲3.60
Labour	P. Skinley	2,434	51.44	▲1.41
Alliance	J. Kendrick	1,967	41.57	▼4.82
Alliance	J. Diamond	1,820	38.46	▼7.93
Conservative	E. Bayley	227	4.80	▲1.22
Conservative	J. Atkinson	207	4.37	▲0.79
Majority		571	12.07	▲8.43
Turnout		4,732	41.82	▼8.74
Labour gain from Liberal		Swing	+1.10	
Labour hold		Swing	+4.67	

Thursday 3 May 1984
Party	Candidate	Votes	%	±%
Labour	S. J. Ellison	2,911	50.03	▲1.57
Liberal	D. M. B. Croft	2,699	46.39	▲0.19
Conservative	A. Brill	208	3.58	▼1.76
Majority		212	3.64	▲1.38
Turnout		5,818	50.56	▲10.13
Registered electors		11,508		▼212
Labour gain from Liberal		Swing	+0.69	

Thursday 5 May 1983
Party	Candidate	Votes	%	±%
Labour	John McIntosh	2,296	48.46	▲5.91
Liberal	Jimmy Kendrick	2,189	46.20	▼0.97
Conservative	W. D. Henry	253	5.34	▼4.93
Majority		107	2.26	▼2.36
Turnout		4,738	40.43	▲4.41
Registered electors		11,720		
Labour gain from Liberal		Swing	+3.34	

Thursday 6 May 1982
Party	Candidate	Votes	%	±%
Liberal	William Roberts	1,970	47.17	▼9.76
Labour	John McIntosh	1,777	42.55	▲11.12
Conservative	A. Wilson	429	10.27	▼1.37
Majority		193	4.62	▼20.87
Turnout		4,176	36.02	▲1.16
Registered electors		11,592		
Liberal hold		Swing	-10.44	

Thursday 1st May 1980 (Note: Due to boundary changes the whole of the council faced re-election. Three members were elected.)
Party	Candidate	Votes	%	±%
Liberal	David Michael Bruce Croft	2,367	56.93	
Liberal	Frank McNevin	2,318	55.75	
Liberal	William Roberts	2,173	52.26	
Labour	John Connolly	1,307	31.43	
Labour	Philip Howard Rowe	1,187	28.55	
Labour	Miriam Ann Jones	1,166	28.04	
Conservative	James Butterfield	484	11.64	
Conservative	Brian John Hawkins	376	9.04	
Conservative	Teresa Hawkins	342	8.23	
Majority		1,060	25.49	
Turnout		4,158	34.86	
Registered electors		11,928		
Liberal win (new seat)				
Liberal win (new seat)				
Liberal win (new seat)				

== See also ==
- Liverpool City Council
- Liverpool City Council elections 1880–present
- Liverpool Town Council elections 1835 - 1879
