= 1937 Liverpool City Council election =

1937 UK local election

← 1936	1 November 1975	1938 →

40 councillors' seats were up for election (one third): one seat for each of the 40 wards 81 of 120 Councillors and 40 Aldermen seats needed for a majority

Elections to Liverpool City Council were held on 1 November 1937. One third of the council seats were up for election, the term of office of each councillor being three years.

Eight of the forty seats up for election were uncontested.

After the election, the composition of the council was:

Party	Councillors	±	Aldermen	Total
Conservative	??	??	??	??
Labour	??	??	??	??
Protestant	??	??	??	??
Independent	??	??	??	??
Liberal	??	??	??	??

== Election result ==
Liverpool local election result 1937
Party	Seats	Gains	Losses	Net gain/loss	Seats %	Votes %	Votes	+/−
Conservative	27	8	1	+7	67.5%	57%	97,769	
Labour	11	1	8	-7	27.5%	37%	63,796	
Protestant	1	0	0	0	2.5%	2.6%	4,559	
Independent	1	0	0	0	2.5%	1.6%	2,778	
Liberal	0	0	0	0	0%	2.2%	3,790	
British Union of Fascists	0	0	0	0	0%	0.075%	129	
Independent Labour	0	0	0	0	0%	0.065%	113	

== Ward results ==
* - Councillor seeking re-election

Comparisons are made with the 1934 election results.

=== Abercromby ===
No. 9 Abercromby
Party	Candidate	Votes	%	±%
Labour	John Reginald Bevins	2,803	55%	
Conservative	Richard Clitherow	2,291	45%	
Majority		512		
Registered electors		9,647		
Turnout		5,094	53%	
Labour hold		Swing		

=== Aigburth ===
No. 17 Aigburth
Party	Candidate	Votes	%	±%
Conservative	William Edward Stirling Napier	3,121	59%	
Liberal	John Richard Jones *	2,151	41%	
Majority		970		
Registered electors		10,659		
Turnout		5,272	49%	
Conservative gain from Liberal		Swing		

=== Allerton ===
No. 35 Allerton
Party	Candidate	Votes	%	±%
Conservative	Gertrude Elizabeth Wilson *	2,453	79%	
Labour	John Albert Riddell	635	21%	
Majority		1,818		
Registered electors		6,074		
Turnout		3,088	51%	
Conservative hold		Swing		

=== Anfield ===
No. 29 Anfield
Party	Candidate	Votes	%	±%
Conservative	George Young Williamson *	4,179	73%	
Labour	John Francis Kenrick	1,528	27%	
Majority		2,651		
Registered electors		11,273		
Turnout		5,707	51%	
Conservative hold		Swing		

=== Breckfield ===
No. 30 Breckfield
Party	Candidate	Votes	%	±%
Conservative	George William Prout	4,046	75%	
Labour	William Tipping	1,343	25%	
Majority		2,703		
Registered electors		9,955		
Turnout		5,389	54%	
Conservative hold		Swing		

=== Brunswick ===
No. 11 Brunswick
Party	Candidate	Votes	%	±%
Labour	Patrick Moorhead *	unopposed		
Registered electors				
Labour hold		Swing		

=== Castle Street ===
No. 7 Castle Street
Party	Candidate	Votes	%	±%
Conservative	Herbert Neville Bewley *	unopposed		
Registered electors				
Conservative hold		Swing		

=== Childwall ===
No. 38 Childwall
Party	Candidate	Votes	%	±%
Conservative	Stanley Foster	2,423	55%	
Liberal	William Minto Mirrlees	1,639	37%	
Labour	John Wood	319	7%	
Majority		784		
Registered electors		7,427		
Turnout		4,381	59%	
Conservative gain from Liberal		Swing		

=== Croxteth ===
No. 40 Croxteth
Party	Candidate	Votes	%	±%
Labour	Alfred Hargreaves *	3,570	62%	
Independent	James Charles Pollard	2,148	38%	
Majority		1,422		
Registered electors		19,973		
Turnout		5,718		
Labour hold		Swing		

=== Dingle ===
No. 12 Dingle
Party	Candidate	Votes	%	±%
Conservative	George William Neale Gillespie	5,798	61%	
Labour	John David Towers *	3,678	39%	
Majority		2,120		
Registered electors		14,812		
Turnout		9,476	64%	
Conservative gain from Labour		Swing		

=== Edge Hill ===
No. 18 Edge Hill
Party	Candidate	Votes	%	±%
Conservative	Bertram Saul Morgan	3,568	56%	
Labour	Agnes Mitton *	2,817	44%	
Majority		751		
Registered electors		11,591		
Turnout		6,385	55%	
Conservative gain from Labour		Swing		

=== Everton ===
No. 21 Everton
Party	Candidate	Votes	%	±%
Labour	David Nickson *	4,268	64%	
Conservative	James Moore	2,418	36%	
Majority		1,850		
Registered electors		12,052		
Turnout		6,686	55%	
Labour hold		Swing		

=== Exchange ===
No. 5 Exchange
Party	Candidate	Votes	%	±%
Independent	Peter Kavanagh *	unopposed		
Registered electors				
Independent hold		Swing		

=== Fairfield ===
No. 31 Fairfield
Party	Candidate	Votes	%	±%
Conservative	Charles Gordon Snowdon Gordon *	2,983	62%	
Labour	Harold Stanley Martin	1,813	38%	
Majority		1,170		
Registered electors		10,410		
Turnout		4,796	46%	
Conservative hold		Swing		

=== Fazakerley ===
No. 27 Fazakerley
Party	Candidate	Votes	%	±%
Conservative	Albert Gray Meredith	4,168	65%	
Labour	Francis Lavery *	2,278	35%	
Majority		1,890		
Registered electors		11,985		
Turnout		6,446	54%	
Conservative gain from Labour		Swing		

=== Garston ===
No. 37 Garston
Party	Candidate	Votes	%	±%
Conservative	Alfred Millwood Proffit	2,857	56%	
Labour	John Herbert Webster *	2,201	44%	
Majority		656		
Registered electors		8,005		
Turnout		5,058	63%	
Conservative gain from Labour		Swing		

=== Granby ===
No. 14 Granby
Party	Candidate	Votes	%	±%
Conservative	Ernest Tyrer	2,781	53%	
Labour	Miss Mary Cumella *	2,454	47%	
Majority		327		
Registered electors		9,699		
Turnout		5,235	54%	
Conservative gain from Labour		Swing		

=== Great George ===
No. 10 Great George
Party	Candidate	Votes	%	±%
Labour	John Hamilton *	1,310	68%	
Independent	Stamford Botley	630	32%	
Majority		1,310		
Registered electors		4,346		
Turnout		1,940	45%	
Labour hold		Swing		

=== Kensington ===
No. 19 Kensington
Party	Candidate	Votes	%	±%
Conservative	John Case *	3,808	68%	
Labour	Leo Patrick Taylor	1,780	32%	
Majority		2,028		
Registered electors		10,871		
Turnout		5,588	51%	
Conservative hold		Swing		

=== Kirkdale ===
No. 24 Kirkdale
Party	Candidate	Votes	%	±%
Conservative	Joseph Alan Reston	5,420	56%	
Labour	William James Riddick *	4,209	44%	
Majority		1,211		
Registered electors		16,128		
Turnout		9,629	60%	
Conservative gain from Labour		Swing		

=== Little Woolton ===
No. 39 Little Woolton
Party	Candidate	Votes	%	±%
Conservative	Rupert Henry Bremner *	496	88%	
Labour	George Thomas Wood	69	12%	
Majority		427		
Registered electors		874		
Turnout		565	65%	
Conservative hold		Swing		

=== Low Hill ===
No. 20 Low Hill
Party	Candidate	Votes	%	±%
Conservative	Kenneth Harvey Steel	3,271	53%	
Labour	Frederick Charles Pasco *	2,932	47%	
Majority		339		
Registered electors		10,319		
Turnout		6,203	60%	
Conservative gain from Labour		Swing		

=== Much Woolton ===
No. 36 Much Woolton
Party	Candidate	Votes	%	±%
Conservative	Vivian Forsyth Crosthwaite *	1,453	71%	
Labour	Andrew Campbell	586	29%	
Majority		867		
Registered electors		2,911		
Turnout		2,039	70%	
Conservative hold		Swing		

=== Netherfield ===
No. 22 Netherfield
Party	Candidate	Votes	%	±%
Conservative	Evan Thomas Edwards	4,436	68%	
Labour	John Bagot	2,073	32%	
Majority		2,363		
Registered electors		10,638		
Turnout		6,509	61%	
Conservative gain from Labour		Swing		

=== North Scotland ===
No. 2 North Scotland
Party	Candidate	Votes	%	±%
Labour	Patrick Fay *	unopposed		
Registered electors				
Labour hold		Swing		

=== Old Swan ===
No. 32 Old Swan
Party	Candidate	Votes	%	±%
Conservative	John Waterworth *	5,770	63%	
Labour	John Gordon Houston	3,370	37%	
Majority		2,400		
Registered electors		18,227		
Turnout		9,140	50%	
Conservative hold		Swing		

=== Prince's Park ===
No. 13 Prince's Park
Party	Candidate	Votes	%	±%
Conservative	Arthur Perrins Bevan	3,484	63%	
Labour	Alfred Demain *	2,050	37%	
Majority		1,434		
Registered electors		9,664		
Turnout		5,534	57%	
Conservative gain from Labour		Swing		

=== Sandhills ===
No. 1 Sandhills
Party	Candidate	Votes	%	±%
Labour	Thomas Henry Dunford *	unopposed		
Registered electors				
Labour hold		Swing		

=== St. Anne's ===
No. 6 St. Anne's
Party	Candidate	Votes	%	±%
Labour	John David Mack *	unopposed		
Registered electors				
Labour hold		Swing		

=== St. Domingo ===
No. 23 St. Domingo
Party	Candidate	Votes	%	±%
Protestant	William Reuben Price *	4,559	77%	
Labour	John Victor Shortt	1,350	23%	
Majority		3,209		
Registered electors		10,968		
Turnout		5,909	54%	
Protestant hold		Swing		

=== St. Peter's ===
No. 8 St. Peter's
Party	Candidate	Votes	%	±%
Labour	Hugh Carr	551	52%	
Conservative	Sydney James Hill *	512	48%	
Majority		39		
Registered electors		2,353		
Turnout		1,063	45%	
Labour gain from Conservative		Swing		

=== Sefton Park East ===
No. 15 Sefton Park East
Party	Candidate	Votes	%	±%
Conservative	George Webster Green Armour *	2,710	76%	
Labour	John Henry Higgins	848	24%	
Majority		1,862		
Registered electors		8,752		
Turnout		3,558	41%	
Conservative hold		Swing		

=== Sefton Park West ===
No. 16 Sefton Park West
Party	Candidate	Votes	%	±%
Conservative	James Graham Reece *	2,785	76%	
Labour	Mary Woodward Walbank	876	24%	
Majority		1,909		
Registered electors		6,718		
Turnout		3,661	545	
Conservative hold		Swing		

=== South Scotland ===
No. 3 South Scotland
Party	Candidate	Votes	%	±%
Labour	Joseph Harrington *	3,619	97%	
Independent Labour	Charles Malachie Williams	113	3%	
Majority		3,619		
Registered electors		7,964		
Turnout		3,732	47%	
Labour hold		Swing		

=== Vauxhall ===
No. 4 Vauxhall
Party	Candidate	Votes	%	±%
Labour	Joseph Leo Carney *	unopposed		
Registered electors				
Labour hold		Swing		

=== Walton ===
No. 25 Walton
Party	Candidate	Votes	%	±%
Conservative	Reginald Richards Bailey *	6,289	72%	
Labour	Richard Austin Rockliff	2,442	28%	
Majority		3,847		
Registered electors		16,609		
Turnout		8,731	535	
Conservative hold		Swing		

=== Warbreck ===
No. 26 Warbreck
Party	Candidate	Votes	%	±%
Conservative	Alexander Critchley *	4,251	71%	
Labour	William Bent	1,778	29%	
Majority		2,473		
Registered electors		13,336		
Turnout		6,029	45%	
Conservative hold		Swing		

=== Wavertree ===
No. 34 Wavertree
Party	Candidate	Votes	%	±%
Conservative	John Village *	unopposed		
Registered electors				
Conservative hold		Swing		

=== Wavertree West ===
No. 33 Wavertree West
Party	Candidate	Votes	%	±%
Conservative	Maurice Voss	3,129	67%	
Labour	Daniel Whelan	1,436	31%	
British Union of Fascists	William Edwards	129	2.7%	
Majority		1,693		
Registered electors		8,681		
Turnout		4,694	54%	
Conservative hold		Swing		

=== West Derby ===
No. 28 West Derby
Party	Candidate	Votes	%	±%
Conservative	Robert Duncan French *	6,869	71%	
Labour	Joseph Henry Sayle	2,810	29%	
Majority		4,059		
Registered electors		20,686		
Turnout		9,679	47%	
Conservative hold		Swing		

== Aldermanic Elections ==
=== Aldermanic Election 1 December 1937 ===
Caused by the death of Alderman Maxwell Hyslop Maxwell C.B. C.B.E. (Conservative, last elected as an alderman on 9 November 1935), in whose place Councillor John Morris Griffith (Conservative, elected to the Wavertree ward on 1 November 1936) was elected as an alderman on 1 December 1937.

Aldermanic Election 1 December 1937
Party	Candidate	Votes	%	Allocated ward
Conservative	Councillor John Morris Griffith	60	100%	No. 28 West Derby

The term of office to expire on 9 November 1941.

=== Aldermanic Election 2 March 1938 ===
Caused by the death on 25 January 1938 of Alderman Sir Thomas White (Conservative, last elected as an alderman on 9 November 1932), in whose place Councillor William Thomas Roberts J.P. (Conservative, elected to the Abercromby ward on 1 November 1936) was elected as an alderman by the councillors on 2 March 1938.

Aldermanic Election 2 March 1938
Party	Candidate	Votes	%	Allocated ward
Conservative	Councillor William Thomas Roberts	54	100%	No. 20 Low Hill

The term of office to expire on 9 November 1938.

=== Aldermanic Election 6 July 1938 ===
Caused by the death on 22 May 1938 of Alderman Edwin Haigh (Conservative, last elected as an alderman on 9 November 1935). In whose place, Councillor Robert Duncan French (Conservative, elected to the West Derby ward on 1 November 1937) was elected as an alderman by the councillors on 6 July 1938.

Aldermanic Election 6 July 1938
Party	Candidate	Votes	%	Allocated ward
Conservative	Councillor Robert Duncan French	52	100%	No. 8 St. Peter's

The term of office to expire on 9 November 1941.

=== Aldermanic Election 27 July 1938 ===
Caused by the death on 5 July 1938 of Alderman James Bolger (Independent, last elected as an alderman on 9 November 1932). In whose place Councillor George Young Williamson (Conservative, elected to represent Anfield on 1 November 1937) was elected to the post of alderman on 27 July 1938.

Aldermanic Election 6 July 1938
Party	Candidate	Votes	%	Allocated ward
Conservative	Councillor George Young Williamson	56	66%	No. 8 St. Peter's
Labour	Councillor Bertie Victor Kirby MP	25	29%	not elected
Independent	Councillor Peter Kavanagh	3	4%	not elected
Protestant	Councillor Mary Jane Longbottom	1	1%	not elected

The term of office to expire on 9 November 1938.

== By-elections ==
=== No.31 Fairfield, 30 November 1937 ===
Caused by the death of Councillor John Barry (Conservative, elected 1 November 1935).

No. 31 Fairfield
Party	Candidate	Votes	%	±%
Conservative	Richard Clitherow	2,305	74%	
Labour	Harold Stanley Martin	831	26%	
Majority		1,474		
Registered electors		10,410		
Turnout		3,136	30%	
Conservative hold		Swing		

The term of office to expire on 1 November 1938.

=== No.1 Sandhills, 9 December 1937 ===
Caused by the election as an alderman on 6 October 1937 of Councillor John Wolfe Tone Morrissey JP (Labour, last elected to the Sandhills ward on 1 November 1936), following the death on 7 September 1937 of Alderman Henry Walker (Labour, last elected as an alderman on 9 November 1935).

No. 1 Sandhills
Party	Candidate	Votes	%	±%
Labour	Henry Aldritt	3,686	70%	
	William Edward McLachlan	1,548	30%	
Majority		2,138		
Registered electors				
Turnout		5,234		
Labour hold		Swing		

The term of office to expire on 1 November 1939.

=== No.2 North Scotland, 9 December 1937 ===
Caused by the death on 13 September 1937 of Councillor Henry Gaskin (Labour, elected 1 November 1935).

No. 2 North Scotland
Party	Candidate	Votes	%	±%
Labour	Patrick O'Brien	unopposed		
Registered electors				
Labour hold		Swing		

The term of office to expire on 1 November 1938.

=== No.11 Brunswick, 9 December 1937 ===
Caused by the resignation of Councillor Patrick Moorhead (Labour, elected unopposed for the Brunswick ward on 1 November 1937)

No. 11 Brunswick
Party	Candidate	Votes	%	±%
Labour	Joseph Whitehead	unopposed		
Registered electors				
Labour hold		Swing		

The term of office due to expire on 1 November 1940.

=== No.34 Wavertree, 11 January 1938 ===
Caused by Councillor John Morris Griffith J.P. (Conservative, elected to the Wavertree ward on 1 November 1936) being elected by the councillors as an alderman on 1 December 1937, following the death of Alderman Maxwell Hyslop Maxwell C.B. C.B.E. (Conservative, elected as an alderman 9 November 1935).

No. 34 Wavertree
Party	Candidate	Votes	%	±%
Conservative	Harold Threlfall Wilson	2,969	96%	
	William Edwards	132		
Majority		2,837		
Registered electors				
Turnout		3,101		
Conservative hold		Swing		

The term of office due to expire on 1 November 1939.

=== No.38 Childwall, 24 February 1938 ===
Caused by the resignation of Councillor Alan Anderson Boyle (Liberal, elected unopposed 1 November 1936)

No. 38 Childwall
Party	Candidate	Votes	%	±%
Ind. Ratepayers	William Moss	2142	57.1%	
Conservative	Edward Thomas White	878	23.4%	
Ratepayers	Arthur Morris	501	13.4%	
Labour	Andrew Campbell	226	6.0%	
Majority		1264	33.7%	
Registered electors		7,427		
Turnout		3747	50.5%	
Independent Ratepayer hold		Swing		

The term of office due to expire on 1 November 1939.

=== No.9 Abercromby, Tuesday 5 April 1938 ===
Caused by the election as an alderman of Councillor William Thomas Roberts J.P. (Conservative, elected to the Abercromby ward on 1 November 1936) was elected as an alderman by the councillors on 2 March 1938, following the death on 25 January 1938 of Alderman Sir Thomas White (Conservative, last elected as an alderman on 9 November 1932).

No. 9 Abercromby
Party	Candidate	Votes	%	±%
	Joseph James Eastwood Sloan	1,978	49.7%	
	Andrew Campbell	1,972	49.6%	
	Thomas Lyon Hurst	27	0.007%	
Majority		6		
Registered electors		9,647		
Turnout		3,977	41%	
		Swing		

The term of office due to expire on 1 November 1939.

=== No.15 Sefton Park East, Tuesday 31 May 1938 ===
Occasioned by the resignation of Councillor Eric Douglas Mackay Heriot-Hill (Conservative, elected to the Sefton Park East ward on 1 November 1936).

No. 15 Sefton Park East
Party	Candidate	Votes	%	±%
	Dinsdale Walker	1,344	76%	
	Muriel Edith Mee	418	24%	
Majority		926		
Registered electors		8,752		
Turnout		1,762	20%	
		Swing		

The term of office due to expire on 1 November 1939.

=== No.32 Old Swan, Tuesday 14 June 1938 ===
Caused by the death in May 1938 of Councillor John Waterworth (Conservative, elected to the Old Swan ward on 1 November 1937).

No. 32 Old Swan
Party	Candidate	Votes	%	±%
Conservative	Arthur Haswell	2,323	66%	
Labour	John Gordon Houston	1,212	34%	
Majority		1,111		
Registered electors		18,227		
Turnout		3,535	19%	
Conservative hold		Swing		

The term of office due to expire on 1 November 1940.

=== No.24 Kirkdale, Tuesday 26 July 1938 ===
Caused by the resignation of Councillor Arthur Mackson Brown (Conservative, elected for the Kirkdale ward on 1 November 1936).

No. 24 Kirkdale
Party	Candidate	Votes	%	±%
	William Edward McLachlan	3,226	55%	
	Joseph Henry Sayle	2,644	45%	
Majority		582		
Registered electors		16,128		
Turnout		5,870	36%	
	gain from	Swing		

The term of office due to expire on 1 November 1939.

=== No.28 West Derby, 26 July 1938 ===
Caused by Councillor Robert Duncan French (Conservative, elected to the West Derby ward on 1 November 1937) being elected by the councillors as an alderman on 6 July 1938, following the death on 22 May 1938 of Alderman Edwin Haigh (Conservative, last elected as an alderman on 9 November 1935).

No. 28 West Derby
Party	Candidate	Votes	%	±%
Conservative	Charles William Wingrove	unopposed		
Registered electors		20,686		
Conservative hold		Swing		

The term of office due to expire on 1 November 1940.

=== No.29 Anfield, 30 August 1938 ===
Caused by the election to the post of alderman on 27 July 1938 of Councillor George Young Williamson (Conservative, elected to represent Anfield on 1 November 1937), following the death on 5 July 1938 of Alderman James Bolger.

No. 29 Anfield
Party	Candidate	Votes	%	±%
Conservative	William John Harrop	unopposed		
Registered electors		11,273		
Conservative hold		Swing		

The term of office due to expire on 1 November 1940.

== See also ==
- Liverpool City Council
- Liverpool Town Council elections 1835 - 1879
- Liverpool City Council elections 1880–present
- Mayors and Lord Mayors of Liverpool 1207 to present
- History of local government in England
