= Bertie Kirby =

British politician

Bertie Victor Kirby CBE DCM (2 May 1887 – 1 September 1953) was a British politician. He was Labour Member of Parliament (MP) for Liverpool Everton from 1935 to 1950.

Kirby inspired the headline "Once Errand Boy in Local Store – Now M P" in the Tewkesbury Register of 16 November 1935 after he had been elected for Labour as M.P. for Everton with a majority of 177. Kirby was described by the newspaper as a "former soldier and policemen" born in Cheltenham but came to Tewkesbury as a baby.

The 1891 and 1901 censuses confirm that he was living in Mount Pleasant Road (3 Pansy Cottages; the family was still living in Pansy Cottages during the 1909 Land Tax Survey), Tewkesbury and had been born in Cheltenham. His father, Henry Kirby, was a 51-year-old gardener, born in Prestbury, Gloucestershire and his mother, Fanny, was aged 54 and had been born in Gloucester. Bertie then had two older sisters. He was educated at the Barton Road Schools, Tewkesbury, and, on leaving, became an errand boy for Frisby's shoe shop then located at "The Cross" – the location of a War Memorial, in Tewkesbury.

It was claimed that he moved to a branch in Upton-upon-Severn but, by the 1911 Census, he had joined the army and was then "Bombardier, Royal Horse Artillery, on sick" again living with his parents at 78 Marle Hill Parade, Cheltenham.

As a Reservist in 1914, he is listed as "A. Kirby" on the "Memorial to Those who Volunteered" located in Tewkesbury Abbey. Subsequently, he became a Battery Sergeant Major (49135) and was awarded the DCM on 22 September 1917. The newspaper reported, "While six ammunition wagons were being unloaded, a sudden and intense fire was opened, and a scene of great confusion ensued; it was very dark, and the drivers were unable to see what to do in their gas masks. He removed his smoke helmet and assisted the officer in charge to restore order and by doing so saved a considerable block in the traffic which would have caused heavy casualties. His coolness and presence of mind under heavy fire set a very fine example at a time when it was most needed."

Kirby's medal record confirms the D.C.M. as well as four more general medals. As he had re-enlisted on 5 November 1914, he was awarded the 1914 Star.

Despite using the testimony of his sister-in-law, the newspaper erred when it stated that he married in 1917 because the marriage was recorded in March qtr 1916; his bride was Alice E. Richmond of Ashchurch, whose father H. Richmond worked for Midland Railway.

After the war, Kirby joined the Liverpool City Police .However, in his obituary it is claimed that "A year before the war broke out he had gone to Liverpool and, soon after the war, became district official of the National Union of Clerks and Administrative Workers.

Kirby was first elected to the Liverpool City Council in 1924, when he won the Everton ward from the Conservatives. In 1939 he was elected an Alderman. His work in Liverpool – other than his tireless efforts in the Labour interest – included the deputy chairmanship of the Liverpool Education Committee (as well as membership of others) and the representation of organised Labour on the Merseyside Hospitals Council, and many other bodies.

In 1935 he won the Everton division of Liverpool from the Conservatives and he held the seat until the division ceased to exist in 1950 after the redistribution of constituencies. The new M.P. wrote a letter of thanks on 20 November 1935 when living at 710 Queens Drive, Knotty Ash, Liverpool 13. He wrote, "I spent all my young life in Tewkesbury, of which I am quite proud.......".

After his election, he was known as Captain Bertie Kirby (1887 – 1 September 1953) and represented the Everton Constituency until it was abolished on 23 February 1950. In total, Hansard records 825 interventions, the first dated 6 December 1935 when, in the Debate on the Address he criticised the means testing of the unemployed. His last recorded contribution was on 9 December 1948 when he received a Written Answer concerning the Departmental Claims Branch, Liverpool.

His obituary continues, "In the House of Commons, Kirby was a hard working back-bench member. He was a member of the famous Select Committee on National Expenditure during the war, a member of the Public Accounts Committee after the war, and chairman of the Select Committee on Estimates from 1946 to 1950. Such a member is invaluable in the House, giving disinterested service and seeking none of the limelight. Few men more thoroughly earned the honour which he was given in 1947, when he was created CBE for public services."

He then fought the newly created West Derby division of Liverpool but was defeated by Sir David Maxwell-Fyfe.

Kirby's death, aged 66, was registered in the September qtr. of 1953 in the Liverpool North District Vol. 10d, page 301 His obituary appeared in The Times.

Parliament of the United Kingdom
Preceded by Frank Hornby	Member of Parliament for Liverpool Everton; 1935 – 1950	Succeeded by Constituency abolished
