= Sefton Park (district) =

District of Liverpool, Merseyside, England

Coordinates: 53.381°N 2.940°W

Sefton Park is a district and ward within the city of Liverpool, Merseyside, United Kingdom. Sefton Park is a designated conservation area.

The district surrounds the park from which it takes its name, Sefton Park, which was laid out in the 1860s. Greenbank House on Greenbank Lane dates from 1787, and was the home of the Rathbone family.

The original urbanisation of the area was mainly in the Victorian era, with large Victorian villas, particularly facing the park itself, and terraces and apartment blocks on nearby streets. In the 1820s, some wealthy members of the Chian diaspora settled here.

Lark Lane is lined with pubs, restaurants and specialist shops.

The University of Liverpool has several halls of residence in the Sefton Park district.

There was a railway station called Sefton Park, a short distance away and confusingly facing a different park (Wavertree), but it closed in 1960. The line is still in use, and the station buildings at street level survive in the form of commercial premises. Little evidence of the station is visible at track level, above the road. The nearest railway stations still operating are St Michaels railway station and Mossley Hill railway station.
