= Sandhills (Liverpool ward) =

Former ward in Liverpool

Coordinates: 53.4300°N 2.9917°W

Sandhills Ward
- Former ward
- Location within Merseyside
- OS grid reference: SJ342930
  - London: 178 mi (286 km) SE
- Metropolitan borough: City of Liverpool
- Metropolitan county: Merseyside
- Region: North West
- Country: England
- Sovereign state: United Kingdom
- Post town: LIVERPOOL
- Postcode district: L5
- Dialling code: 0151
- Police: Merseyside
- Fire: Merseyside
- Ambulance: North West
- UK Parliament: Liverpool Riverside

Sandhills ward was a former electoral division of Liverpool, England. It was first established in 1895, and it covered part of the city’s dockside and nearby residential areas. The ward was abolished in 1973.

== Overview ==
Sandhills ward was originally established in 1895. The ward was formed from parts of the Everton and Kirkdale wards as part of boundary changes to accommodate the city's growing population. Named after the Sandhills area in north Liverpool, the ward served as a residential and industrial district close to the city’s docklands. It was abolished in 1973 following a city-wide reorganisation of electoral boundaries, and replaced by Sandhills, Vauxhall ward, which was abolished in 1980. The area takes its name from natural sand deposits along the Mersey’s edge and the Sandhills railway station is located within its vicinity.

== Elections ==
Sandhills ward was a continuous feature of Liverpool politics through the early to mid‑20th century, with councillors elected annually, including elections in the 1940s, 1950s, and 1960s. From 1953 to 1973, Sandhills was one of Liverpool’s 20 three-seat wards until the 1973 reorganisation, which abolished aldermanic seats and reduced ward numbers.

=== 1919 ===
No. 1 Sandhills
Party	Candidate	Votes	%	±%
Irish Nationalist	Thomas Wafer Byrne	unopposed		
Registered electors				
Irish Nationalist hold		Swing		

=== 1920 ===
No. 1 Sandhills
Party	Candidate	Votes	%	±%
Irish Nationalist	James William Baker	2,780	55%	
Liberal	Alfred Gates *	2,243	45%	
Majority		537		
Registered electors		8,321		
Turnout		1,092	60%	
Irish Nationalist gain from Liberal		Swing		

=== 1921 ===
No. 1 Sandhills
Party	Candidate	Votes	%	±%
Irish Nationalist	John Cunningham *	2,181	78%	
Liberal	Joseph Edward Freeman	600	22%	
Majority		1,581		
Registered electors		8,603		
Turnout		2,781	32%	
Irish Nationalist hold		Swing		

=== 1922 ===
No. 1 Sandhills
Party	Candidate	Votes	%	±%
Irish Nationalist	Thomas Wafer Byrne *	unopposed		
Registered electors				
Irish Nationalist hold		Swing		

=== 1923 ===
No. 1 Sandhills
Party	Candidate	Votes	%	±%
Irish Nationalist	James William Baker *	2,680	84%	
Labour	Patrick Roy	353	11%	
Unemployed	Daniel Williams	161	5%	
Majority		2,327		
Registered electors		8,711		
Turnout		3,194	37%	
Irish Nationalist hold		Swing		

=== 1924 ===
No. 1 Sandhills
Party	Candidate	Votes	%	±%
Labour	Thomas Dakin	2,120	53%	
Irish Nationalist	William Henry McGuiness	1,855	47%	
Majority		265		
Registered electors		8,803		
Turnout		3,975	45%	
Labour gain from Irish Nationalist		Swing		

=== 1925 ===
No. 1 Sandhills
Party	Candidate	Votes	%	±%
Labour	Thomas Wafer Byrne *	2,829	63%	
Catholic	William Henry McGuiness	1,695	37%	
Majority		1,134		
Registered electors		8,995		
Turnout		4,524	50%	
Labour gain from Irish Nationalist		Swing		

=== 1926 ===
No. 1 Sandhills
Party	Candidate	Votes	%	±%
Catholic	James William Baker *	1,790	51%	
Conservative	Thomas Henry.Dunford	1,737	49%	
Majority		53		
Registered electors		8,996		
Turnout		3,527	39%	
Catholic gain from Irish Nationalist		Swing		

=== 1927 ===
No. 1 Sandhills
Party	Candidate	Votes	%	±%
Labour	John Wolfe Tone Morrissey	2,638	64%	
Catholic	Christopher Maguire	1,492	36%	
Majority		1,146		
Registered electors		8,841		
Turnout		4,130	47%	
Labour hold		Swing		

=== 1928 ===
No. 1 Sandhills
Party	Candidate	Votes	%	±%
Labour	Thomas Wafer Byrne *	unopposed		
Registered electors				
Labour hold		Swing		

=== 1929 ===
No. 1 Sandhills
Party	Candidate	Votes	%	±%
Labour	James William Baker *	3,695	81%	
Conservative	Joseph Edward Freeman	868	19%	
Majority		2,737		
Registered electors		9,565		
Turnout		4,473	47%	
Labour gain from Catholic		Swing		

=== 1930 ===
No. 1 Sandhills
Party	Candidate	Votes	%	±%
Labour	John Wolfe Tone Morrissey *	unopposed		
Registered electors				
Labour hold		Swing		

=== 1931 ===
No. 1 Sandhills
Party	Candidate	Votes	%	±%
Labour	Thomas Henry Dunford	2,355	88%	
Communist	Mrs.Beatrice Bruce	314	12%	
Majority		314		
Registered electors		9,499		
Turnout		2,669	28%	
Labour hold		Swing		

=== 1932 ===
No. 1 Sandhills
Party	Candidate	Votes	%	±%
Labour	James William Baker *	2,903	94%	
Communist	Ieuan Peters Hughes	198	6%	
Majority		2,705		
Registered electors		9,369		
Turnout		3,101	33%	
Labour hold		Swing		

=== 1933 ===
No. 1 Sandhills
Party	Candidate	Votes	%	±%
Labour	John Wolfe Tone Morrissey *	unopposed		
Registered electors				
Labour hold		Swing		

=== 1934 ===
No. 1 Sandhills
Party	Candidate	Votes	%	±%
Labour	Thomas Henry Dunford *	unopposed		
Registered electors		9,194		
Labour hold		Swing		

=== 1935 ===
No. 1 Sandhills
Party	Candidate	Votes	%	±%
Labour	Stanley Part	Unopposed		
Registered electors				
Labour hold		Swing		

=== 1936 ===
No. 1 Sandhills
Party	Candidate	Votes	%	±%
Labour	John Wolfe Tone Morrissey *	unopposed		
Registered electors				
Labour hold		Swing		

=== 1937 ===
No. 1 Sandhills
Party	Candidate	Votes	%	±%
Labour	Thomas Henry Dunford *	unopposed		
Registered electors				
Labour hold		Swing		

=== 1938 ===
No. 1 Sandhills
Party	Candidate	Votes	%	±%
Labour	Stanley Part *	unopposed		
Registered electors				
Labour hold		Swing		

=== 1945 ===
Sandhills
Party	Candidate	Votes	%	±%
Labour	Henry Aldritt	unopposed		
Registered electors		7,277		

=== 1946 ===
Sandhills
Party	Candidate	Votes	%	±%
Labour	Thomas Henry Dunford	2,076	74%	
Conservative	John Edward Molloy	715	26%	
Majority		1,361		
Registered electors		7,904		
Turnout		2,791	35%	

=== 1947 ===
Sandhills
Party	Candidate	Votes	%	±%
Labour	Stanley Part	2,421	73%	
Conservative	Frederick Charles Hitches	891	27%	
Majority		1,530		
Registered electors		8,047		
Turnout		3,312	41%	
Labour hold		Swing		

=== 1949 ===
Sandhills - 2 seats
Party	Candidate	Votes	%	±%
Labour	Peter McKernan	3,110	75%	
Labour	Henry Alldritt *	2,873	70%	
Conservative	Joseph Norton	1,011	25%	
Conservative	Frederick Charles Hitches	949	23%	
Majority		2,099		
Registered electors		8,024		
Turnout		4,121	51%	
Labour hold		Swing		
Labour hold		Swing		

=== 1950 ===
Sandhills
Party	Candidate	Votes	%	±%
Labour	Henry Alldritt	2,408	79%	+6%
Conservative	Frederick C. Hitches	645	21%	−6%
Majority		1,763		
Registered electors		7,961		
Turnout		3,053	38%	−3%
Labour hold		Swing		

=== 1951 ===
Sandhills
Party	Candidate	Votes	%	±%
Labour	Stanley Part *	2,332	75%	+2%
Conservative	Leonard James Carr	790	25%	−2%
Majority		1,542		
Registered electors		8,160		
Turnout		3,122	38%	−3%
Labour hold		Swing	+2%	

=== 1952 ===
Sandhills
Party	Candidate	Votes	%	±%
Labour	Peter McKernan * - unopposed			
Majority				
Registered electors				
Turnout				
Labour hold		Swing		

=== 1953 ===
Sandhills - 3 seats
Party	Candidate	Votes	%	±%
Labour	P. McKernan *	3,038	80%	
Labour	S. Part *	2,825	74%	+18%
Labour	H. Aldritt *	2,727	72%	−7%
Conservative	J. McQuade	757	20%	
Majority		2,281		
Registered electors		9,978		
Turnout		3,795	38%	0%
Labour hold		Swing		
Labour hold		Swing		
Labour hold		Swing		

=== 1954 ===
Sandhills
Party	Candidate	Votes	%	±%
Labour	H. Alldritt *	2,926	85%	+13%
Conservative	G. J. McQuade	518	15%	−5%
Majority		2,408		
Registered electors		9,862		
Turnout		3,444	35%	−3%
Labour hold		Swing		

=== 1955 ===
Sandhills
Party	Candidate	Votes	%	±%
Labour	S. Parr *	2,918	88%	
Conservative	W. H. Beavan	387	12%	
Majority		2,531		
Registered electors		9,888		
Turnout		3,305	33%	
Labour hold		Swing		

=== 1956 ===
Sandhills
Party	Candidate	Votes	%	±%
Labour	H. Rowlands ^{(PARTY)}	2,746	92%	
Independent	A. P. Cooney	223	8%	
Majority		2,746		
Registered electors		9,863		
Turnout		2,969	30%	
Labour hold		Swing		

=== 1957 ===
Sandhills
Party	Candidate	Votes	%	±%
Labour	J. Scully	2,177	93%	
Conservative	A. E. Dailey	153	7%	
Majority		2,024		
Registered electors		9,818		
Turnout		2,330	24%	
Labour hold		Swing		

=== 1958 ===
Sandhills
Party	Candidate	Votes	%	±%
Labour	W. H. Aldritt ^{(PARTY)}	2,491	94%	
Conservative	A. E. Dailey	163	6%	
Majority		2,328		
Registered electors		9,417		
Turnout		2,654	28%	
Labour hold		Swing		

=== 1959 ===
Sandhills
Party	Candidate	Votes	%	±%
Labour	V. Burke ^{(PARTY)}	2,281	88%	
Conservative	A. C. Bailey	308	12%	
Majority		1,973		
Registered electors		9,101		
Turnout		2,589	28%	
Labour hold		Swing		

=== 1960 ===
Sandhills
Party	Candidate	Votes	%	±%
Labour	J. Scully *	1,592	90%	−3%
Conservative	A. C. Bailey	173	10%	+3%
Majority		1,419	20%	−4%
Registered electors		9,041		
Turnout		1,765	20%	−4%
Labour hold		Swing		

=== 1961 ===
Sandhills
Party	Candidate	Votes	%	±%
Labour	W. H. Aldritt *	1,842	86%	−8%
Conservative	A. C. Bailey	207	10%	+4%
Communist	B.Campbell	103	5%	+5%
Majority		1,635		
Registered electors		8,758		
Turnout		2,152	25%	−3%
Labour hold		Swing		

=== 1962 ===
Sandhills
Party	Candidate	Votes	%	±%
Labour	V. Burke *	1,878	89%	▲1%
Conservative	A. C. Bailey	146	7%	▼5%
Communist	B. Campbell	95	4%	▼4%
Majority		1,732		
Registered electors		8,440		
Turnout		2,119	25%	▼3%
Labour hold		Swing		

=== 1963 ===
Sandhills
Party	Candidate	Votes	%	±%
Labour	J. Scully *	2,372	91%	+1%
Communist	B. Campbell	133	5%	+5%
Conservative	N. Heywood	100	4%	−6%
Majority		2,239		
Registered electors		7,829		
Turnout		2,605	33%	+13%
Labour hold		Swing		

=== 1964 ===
Sandhills
Party	Candidate	Votes	%	±%
Labour	W. H. Aldritt *	1,954	85%	−1%
Conservative	P. H. Williams	245	11%	+1%
Communist	B. Campbell	102	4%	−1%
Majority		1,709		
Registered electors		7,494		
Turnout		2,301	31%	+6%
Labour hold		Swing		
