= 1854 Liverpool Town Council election =

English local election

← 1853	November 1, 1854	1855 →

16 seats were up for election: one seat for each of the 16 wards 33 (incl. Aldermen) seats needed for a majority

Elections to Liverpool Town Council were held on Thursday 1 November 1854. One third of the council seats were up for election, the term of office of each councillor being three years.

Eight of the sixteen wards were uncontested.

After the election, the composition of the council was:

Party	Councillors	±	Aldermen	Total
Conservative	??	??	??	??
Reformers	??	??	??	??

== Election result ==
Liverpool local election result 1854
Party	Seats	Gains	Losses	Net gain/loss	Seats %	Votes %	Votes	+/−
Conservative								
Whig								

== Ward results ==
* – Retiring Councillor seeking re-election

=== Abercromby ===
No. 11 Abercromby
Party	Candidate	Votes	%	±%
Conservative	John Abraham Tinne	unopposed		
Registered electors				
Conservative hold		Swing		

=== Castle Street ===
No. 6 Castle Street
Party	Candidate	Votes	%	±%
Conservative	Hugh Hornby *	unopposed		
Registered electors				
Conservative hold		Swing		

=== Everton ===
No. 1 Everton
Party	Candidate	Votes	%	±%
Conservative	Daniel Crosthwaite	394	54%	
Whig	Thomas Chalmer	333	46%	
Majority		61	8%	
Registered electors				
Turnout		727		
Conservative hold		Swing		

=== Exchange ===
No. 5 Exchange
Party	Candidate	Votes	%	±%
Conservative	Thomas Littledale *	unopposed		
Registered electors				
Conservative hold		Swing		

=== Great George ===
No. 9 Great George
Party	Candidate	Votes	%	±%
Conservative	Thomas Wagstaff *	unopposed		
Registered electors				
Conservative hold		Swing		

=== Lime Street ===
No. 12 Lime Street
Party	Candidate	Votes	%	±%
	James Johnson*	unopposed		
Registered electors				
		Swing		

=== North Toxteth ===
No. 16 North Toxteth
Party	Candidate	Votes	%	±%
Conservative	Bernard Hall	308	51%	
Whig	W. H. Ogden	296	49%	
Majority		12	2%	
Registered electors				
Turnout		604		
Conservative hold		Swing		

=== Pitt Street ===
No. 8 Pitt Street
Party	Candidate	Votes	%	±%
Conservative	John Gladstone jun. *	Unopposed	N/A	N/A
Registered electors				
Conservative hold				

=== Rodney Street ===
No. 10 Rodney Street
Party	Candidate	Votes	%	±%
Conservative	Thomas Flemming *	unopposed		
Registered electors				
Conservative hold		Swing		

=== St. Anne Street ===
No. 13 St. Anne Street
Party	Candidate	Votes	%	±%
Whig	Joseph Kitchen	211	74%	
Conservative	Raymond William Houghton *	76	26%	
Majority		135	48%	N/A
Registered electors				
Turnout		287		
Whig gain from Conservative		Swing		

=== St. Paul's ===
No. 4 St. Paul's
Party	Candidate	Votes	%	±%
Whig	John Rowland McGuffie *	204	58%	
Whig	Thomas Savage	147	42%	
Majority		57	16%	
Registered electors				
Turnout		351		
Whig hold		Swing		

=== St. Peter's ===
No. 7 St. Peter's
Party	Candidate	Votes	%	±%
Conservative	Harmood Banner *	247	52%	
Whig	A. H. Wylie	71	15%	
Majority		176		
Registered electors				
Turnout		475		
Conservative hold		Swing		

=== Scotland ===
No. 2 Scotland
Party	Candidate	Votes	%	±%
Whig	Archibald Charles Stewart	350	58%	
Conservative	James Thomson *	256	42%	
Majority		350	16%	N/A
Registered electors				
Turnout		606		
Whig gain from Conservative		Swing		

=== South Toxteth ===
No. 15 South Toxteth
Party	Candidate	Votes	%	±%
Conservative	John Stewart *	unopposed		
Registered electors				
Conservative hold		Swing		

=== Vauxhall ===
No. 3 Vauxhall
Party	Candidate	Votes	%	±%
Whig	Edward Bradley *	162	57%	
Conservative	Jonathan Atkinson	124	43%	
Majority		162	14%	
Registered electors				
Turnout		286		
Whig hold		Swing		

=== West Derby ===
No. 14 West Derby
Party	Candidate	Votes	%	±%
Conservative	Richard Mitchell Beckwith *	unopposed		
Registered electors				
Conservative hold		Swing		

== By-elections ==
=== No. 9, Great George, Wednesday 1 November 1854 ===
Caused by the resignation of Councillor John McNichol (Conservative, elected 1 November 1852)

No. 9 Great George
Party	Candidate	Votes	%	±%
Conservative	James Marke Wood	242	53%	
Whig	John Rogers	211	47%	
Majority		31	6%	
Registered electors				
Turnout		453		
Conservative hold		Swing		

== See also ==
- Liverpool Town Council elections 1835 – 1879
- Liverpool City Council elections 1880–present
- Mayors and Lord Mayors of Liverpool 1207 to present
- History of local government in England
