= 1885 Liverpool City Council election =

Liverpool City Council elections 1885

← 1884	2 November 1885	1886 →

16 seats were up for election (one third): one seat for each of the 16 wards 33 (incl. Aldermen) seats needed for a majority

Elections to Liverpool City Council were held on Monday 2 November 1885. One third of the council seats were up for election, the term of office of each councillor being three years.

After the elections, the composition of the council was:

Party	Councillors	±	Aldermen	Total
Conservative	??	+3	16	??
Liberal	??	-3	0	??
Irish Home Rule	3	0	0	3
Irish Nationalists	1	0	0	1

== Election result ==
Liverpool local election result 1885
Party	Seats	Gains	Losses	Net gain/loss	Seats %	Votes %	Votes	+/−
Conservative	9	3	0	+3	56%	41%	2,184	
Liberal	5	0	3	-3	31%	39%	2,103	
Home Rule	2	0	0	0	12.5%	11%	607	

== Ward results ==
* - Retiring Councillor seeking re-election

=== Abercromby ===
No. 11 Abercromby
Party	Candidate	Votes	%	±%
Conservative	Dr. Nicholas Kenrick Marsh *	unopposed		
Registered electors		2,325		
Conservative hold		Swing		

=== Castle Street ===
No. 6 Castle Street
Party	Candidate	Votes	%	±%
Conservative	William Bartlett	830	55%	
Liberal	Walter Blease	687	45%	
Majority		143	10%	N/A
Registered electors		2,081		
Turnout		1,517	73%	
Conservative gain from Liberal		Swing		

=== Everton ===
No. 1 Everton
Party	Candidate	Votes	%	±%
Conservative	John Houlding	Unopposed	N/A	N/A
Registered electors		22,344		
Conservative hold				

=== Exchange ===
No. 5 Exchange
Party	Candidate	Votes	%	±%
Conservative	Robert Wheeler Preston	788	56%	
Home Rule	Dr. John Bligh	607	44%	
Majority		181	12%	N/A
Registered electors		2,154		
Turnout		1,395	65%	
Conservative gain from Liberal		Swing		

=== Great George ===
No. 9 Great George
Party	Candidate	Votes	%	±%
Liberal	James Ruddin	unopposed		
Registered electors		1,158		
Liberal hold		Swing		

=== Lime Street ===
No. 12 Lime Street
Party	Candidate	Votes	%	±%
Liberal	Sir James Allanson Picton *	Unopposed	N/A	N/A
Registered electors		1,863		
Liberal hold				

=== North Toxteth ===
No. 16 North Toxteth
Party	Candidate	Votes	%	±%
Conservative	Thomas Hughes *	unopposed		
Registered electors		2,709		
Conservative hold		Swing		

=== Pitt Street ===
No. 8 Pitt Street
Party	Candidate	Votes	%	±%
Liberal	Jeremiah Miles *	unopposed		
Registered electors		719		
Liberal hold		Swing		

=== Rodney Street ===
No. 10 Rodney Street
Party	Candidate	Votes	%	±%
Liberal	Philip Henry Rathbone *	856	64%	
	N. Smyth	477	36%	
Majority		379		
Registered electors		2,312		
Turnout		1,333	58%	
Liberal hold		Swing		

=== St. Anne Street ===
No. 13 St. Anne Street
Party	Candidate	Votes	%	±%
Conservative	Joseph Woodcock *	unopposed		
Registered electors		2,351		
Conservative hold		Swing		

=== St. Paul's ===
No. 4 St. Paul's
Party	Candidate	Votes	%	±%
Liberal	John Davies *	unopposed		
Registered electors		1,512		
Liberal hold		Swing		

=== St. Peter's ===
No. 7 St. Peter's
Party	Candidate	Votes	%	±%
Conservative	Arthur Hill Holme	566	50%	
Liberal	John Stevenson *	560	50%	
Majority		6	0%	N/A
Registered electors		1,489		
Turnout		1,126	76%	
Conservative gain from Liberal		Swing		

=== Scotland ===
No. 2 Scotland
Party	Candidate	Votes	%	±%
Home Rule	Dr. Alexander Murray Bligh *	unopposed		
Registered electors		7,855		
Home Rule hold		Swing		

=== South Toxteth ===
No. 15 South Toxteth
Party	Candidate	Votes	%	±%
Conservative	William Radcliffe *	unopposed		
Registered electors		5,586		
Conservative hold		Swing		

=== Vauxhall ===
No. 3 Vauxhall
Party	Candidate	Votes	%	±%
Home Rule	Dr. Andrew Commins MP *	Unopposed	N/A	N/A
Registered electors		1,515		
Home Rule hold				

=== West Derby ===
No. 14 West Derby
Party	Candidate	Votes	%	±%
Conservative	Edward Hatton Cookson	unopposed		
Registered electors		10,084		
Conservative hold		Swing		

== By-elections ==
=== No.2, Scotland, 11 November 1885 ===
Caused by the resignation of Councillor Joseph Simpson (Liberal, Scotland, elected 1 November 1883), reported to the Council on 2 December 1885.

No. 2 Scotland
Party	Candidate	Votes	%	±%
Home Rule	William Madden	1,791	85%	
	John McArdle	318	15%	
Majority		1,473		
Registered electors		7,855		
Turnout		2,109	27%	
Home Rule gain from Liberal		Swing		

=== No.12, Lime Street, 4 June 1886 ===
Caused by the death of Councillor Thomas Patrick Holden (Party?, Lime Street, elected 1 November 1883) on 17 May 1886.

No. 12 Lime Street
Party	Candidate	Votes	%	±%
Conservative	John Duncan the younger	unopposed		
Registered electors		1,863		
Conservative gain from		Swing		

=== No. 16, North Toxteth, 22 July 1886 ===
Alderman Thomas Rigby died on 4 June 1886. In his place Councillor John Hughes (Conservative, North Toxteth, elected 1st November 1883) was elected as an alderman by the Council (Councillors and Aldermen) on 7 July 1886

No. 16 North Toxteth
Party	Candidate	Votes	%	±%
Conservative	Herbert Campbell	unopposed		
Registered electors		2,709		
Conservative hold		Swing		

== See also ==
- Liverpool City Council
- Liverpool Town Council elections 1835 - 1879
- Liverpool City Council elections 1880–present
- Mayors and Lord Mayors of Liverpool 1207 to present
- History of local government in England
