= 1884 Liverpool City Council election =

Liverpool City Council elections 1884

← 1883	November 1, 1884	1885 →

16 seats were up for election (one third): one seat for each of the 16 wards 33 (incl. Aldermen) seats needed for a majority

Elections to Liverpool City Council were held on Tuesday 1 November 1884. One third of the council seats were up for election, the term of office of each councillor being three years.

After the election, the composition of the council was:

Party	Councillors	±	Aldermen	Total
Conservative	??	-1	16	??
Liberal	??	+1	0	??
Irish Home Rule	3	-1	0	3
Irish Nationalists	1	+1	0	1

== Election result ==
Liverpool local election result 1884
Party	Seats	Gains	Losses	Net gain/loss	Seats %	Votes %	Votes	+/−
Conservative	10	0	1	-1	63%	56%	15,144	
Liberal	4	1	0	+1	25%	40%	10,928	
Irish Nationalist	1	1	0	+1	6%	2.4%	652	
Home Rule	1	0	1	-1	6%	1.6%	423	

== Ward results ==
* - Retiring Councillor seeking re-election

=== Abercromby ===
No. 11 Abercromby
Party	Candidate	Votes	%	±%
Conservative	Anthony Bower *	unopposed		
Registered electors		2,312		
Conservative hold		Swing		

=== Castle Street ===
No. 6 Castle Street
Party	Candidate	Votes	%	±%
Conservative	Joseph Bond Morgan *	746	51%	
Liberal	Thomas Cropper Ryley	731	49%	
Majority		15	2%	
Registered electors		2,045		
Turnout		1,477	72%	
Conservative hold		Swing		

=== Everton ===
No. 1 Everton
Party	Candidate	Votes	%	±%
Conservative	James Barkeley Smith *	7,859	62%	
Liberal	Washington Champion Rawlins	4,891	38%	
Majority		2,968	24%	
Registered electors		22,147		
Turnout		12,750	58%	
Conservative hold		Swing		

=== Exchange ===
No. 5 Exchange
Party	Candidate	Votes	%	±%
Liberal	Thomas Holder *	unopposed		
Registered electors		2,148		
Liberal hold		Swing		

=== Great George ===
No. 9 Great George
Party	Candidate	Votes	%	±%
Conservative	George Peet *	452	52%	
Liberal	William Hood	424	48%	
Majority		28	4%	
Registered electors		1,151		
Turnout		876	76%	
Conservative hold		Swing		

=== Lime Street ===
No. 12 Lime Street
Party	Candidate	Votes	%	±%
Conservative	Thomas William Oakshott	unopposed		
Registered electors		1,531		
Conservative hold		Swing		

=== North Toxteth ===
No. 16 North Toxteth
Party	Candidate	Votes	%	±%
Conservative	Dr. Robert Hamilton *	3,410	59%	
Liberal	Henry Vaughan	2,380	41%	
Majority		1,030	18%	
Registered electors		9,641		
Turnout		5,790	60%	
Conservative hold		Swing		

=== Pitt Street ===
No. 8 Pitt Street
Party	Candidate	Votes	%	±%
Liberal	Francis Joseph McAdam *	unopposed		
Registered electors		803		
Liberal hold		Swing		

=== Rodney Street ===
No. 10 Rodney Street
Party	Candidate	Votes	%	±%
Liberal	Frederick Smith	763	50%	
Conservative	William John Stewart *	748	50%	
Majority		15	0%	N/A
Registered electors		2,327		
Turnout		1,511	65%	
Liberal gain from Conservative		Swing		

=== St. Anne Street ===
No. 13 St. Anne Street
Party	Candidate	Votes	%	±%
Conservative	Thomas Hayes Sheen *	884	56%	
Liberal	James Fitzpatrick	684	44%	
Majority		200	12%	
Registered electors		2,278		
Turnout		1,568	69%	
Conservative hold		Swing		

=== St. Paul's ===
No. 4 St. Paul's
Party	Candidate	Votes	%	±%
Conservative	George Curzon Dobell	561	51%	
Liberal	Samuel Hough	540	49%	
Majority		21	2%	
Registered electors		1,530		
Turnout		1,101	72%	
Conservative hold		Swing		

=== St. Peter's ===
No. 7 St. Peter's
Party	Candidate	Votes	%	±%
Liberal	William Benjamin Bowring	515	52%	
Conservative	Arthur Hill Holme	484	48%	
Majority		31	4%	
Registered electors		1,467		
Turnout		999	68%	
Liberal hold		Swing		

=== Scotland ===
No. 2 Scotland
Party	Candidate	Votes	%	±%
Home Rule	Laurence Connolly *	unopposed		
Registered electors		7,083		
Home Rule hold		Swing		

=== South Toxteth ===
No. 15 South Toxteth
Party	Candidate	Votes	%	±%
Conservative	Joseph Ball *	unopposed		
Registered electors		5,473		
Conservative hold		Swing		

=== Vauxhall ===
No. 3 Vauxhall
Party	Candidate	Votes	%	±%
Irish Nationalist	Patrick Byrne	652	61%	
Home Rule	Charles McArdle *	423	39%	
Majority		229	22%	N/A
Registered electors		1,546		
Turnout		1,075	70%	
Irish Nationalist gain from Home Rule		Swing		

=== West Derby ===
No. 14 West Derby
Party	Candidate	Votes	%	±%
Conservative	William John Lunt *	unopposed		
Registered electors		9,960		
Conservative hold		Swing		

== By-elections ==
=== No. 1, Everton, 21 November 1884 ===
Caused by the resignation of Councillor Robert Galloway (Conservative, Everton, elected 1 November 1882).

No. 1 Everton
Party	Candidate	Votes	%	±%
Conservative	John Houlding	8,198	58%	
	David Hughes	5,819	42%	
Majority		2,379		
Registered electors		22,147		
Turnout		14,017	63%	
Conservative hold		Swing		

== See also ==
- Liverpool City Council
- Liverpool Town Council elections 1835 - 1879
- Liverpool City Council elections 1880–present
- Mayors and Lord Mayors of Liverpool 1207 to present
- History of local government in England
