= 1852 Liverpool Town Council election =

English local election

← 1851	November 1, 1852	1853 →

16 seats were up for election: one seat for each of the 16 wards 33 (incl. Aldermen) seats needed for a majority

Elections to Liverpool Town Council were held on Monday 1 November 1852. One third of the council seats were up for election, the term of office of each councillor being three years.

Seven of the sixteen wards were uncontested.

After the election, the composition of the council was:

Party	Councillors	±	Aldermen	Total
Conservative	??	??	??	??
Reformers	??	??	??	??

== Election result ==
Liverpool local election result 1852
Party	Seats	Gains	Losses	Net gain/loss	Seats %	Votes %	Votes	+/−
Conservative								
Whig								

== Ward results ==
* - Retiring Councillor seeking re-election

=== Abercromby ===
No. 11 Abercromby
Party	Candidate	Votes	%	±%
Whig	Robertson Gladstone	360	61%	
Conservative	Bernard Hall *	226	39%	
Majority		134	22%	N/A
Registered electors				
Turnout		586		
Whig gain from Conservative		Swing		

=== Castle Street ===
No. 6 Castle Street
Party	Candidate	Votes	%	±%
Whig	Thomas Avison *	Unopposed	N/A	N/A
Registered electors				
Whig hold				

=== Everton ===
No. 1 Everton
Party	Candidate	Votes	%	±%
Conservative	Thomas Darnley Anderson	439	56%	
Whig	Thomas Chalmer *	346	44%	
Majority		93	12%	N/A
Registered electors				
Turnout		785		
Conservative gain from Whig		Swing		

=== Exchange ===
No. 5 Exchange
Party	Candidate	Votes	%	±%
Conservative	James Tyrer *	Unopposed	N/A	N/A
Registered electors				
Conservative hold				

=== Great George ===
No. 9 Great George
Party	Candidate	Votes	%	±%
Conservative	John McNichol	240	56%	
Whig	John Rogers *	188	44%	
Majority		52	12%	N/A
Registered electors				
Turnout		428		
Conservative gain from Whig		Swing		

=== Lime Street ===
No. 12 Lime Street
Party	Candidate	Votes	%	±%
Whig	James Allanson Picton *	Unopposed	N/A	N/A
Registered electors				
Whig hold				

=== North Toxteth ===
No. 16 North Toxteth
Party	Candidate	Votes	%	±%
Conservative	Hilton Halhead	329	69%	
Whig	Thomas Lloyd *	151	31%	
Majority		178	38%	N/A
Registered electors				
Turnout		480		
Conservative gain from Whig		Swing		

=== Pitt Street ===
No. 8 Pitt Street
Party	Candidate	Votes	%	±%
Conservative	Thomas Toulmin *	Unopposed	N/A	N/A
Registered electors				
Conservative hold				

=== Rodney Street ===
No. 10 Rodney Street
Party	Candidate	Votes	%	±%
Conservative	John Barnes Brancker	Unopposed	N/A	N/A
Registered electors				
Conservative hold				

=== St. Anne Street ===
No. 13 St. Anne Street
Party	Candidate	Votes	%	±%
Whig	Thomas Llewelyn Hodson	226	56%	
Conservative	Francis Shand	181	44%	
Majority		45	12%	N/A
Registered electors				
Turnout		407		
Whig gain from Conservative		Swing		

=== St. Paul's ===
No. 4 St. Paul's
Party	Candidate	Votes	%	±%
Conservative	Thomas Godfrey *	207	52%	
Whig	Thomas Savage	193	48%	
Majority		14	4%	
Registered electors				
Turnout		560		
Conservative hold		Swing		

=== St. Peter's ===
No. 7 St. Peter's
Party	Candidate	Votes	%	±%
Whig	John Charles Fernihough *	Unopposed	N/A	N/A
Registered electors				
Whig hold				

=== Scotland ===
No. 2 Scotland
Party	Candidate	Votes	%	±%
Whig	John Bingham *	297	54%	
Conservative	Samuel Taylor	249	44%	
Majority		48	10%	
Registered electors				
Turnout		546		
Whig hold		Swing		

=== South Toxteth ===
No. 15 South Toxteth
Party	Candidate	Votes	%	±%
Conservative	William Joseph Horsfall *	Unopposed	N/A	N/A
Registered electors				
Conservative hold				

=== Vauxhall ===
No. 3 Vauxhall
Party	Candidate	Votes	%	±%
Whig	John Moss	144	54%	
Conservative	Alexander Shand	123	46%	
Majority		21	8%	N/A
Registered electors				
Turnout		267		
Whig gain from Conservative		Swing		

=== West Derby ===
No. 14 West Derby
Party	Candidate	Votes	%	±%
Conservative	Arthur Henderson *	243	61%	
Whig	William Earle	158	39%	
Majority		85	22%	N/A
Registered electors				
Turnout		401		
Conservative gain from Whig		Swing		

== See also ==
- Liverpool Town Council elections 1835 - 1879
- Liverpool City Council elections 1880–present
- Mayors and Lord Mayors of Liverpool 1207 to present
- History of local government in England
