= 1859 Liverpool Town Council election =

English local election

- 1 November 1859

16 seats were up for election: one seat for each of the 16 wards 33 (incl. Aldermen) seats needed for a majority

Elections to Liverpool Town Council were held on Thursday 1 November 1859. One third of the council seats were up for election, the term of office of each councillor being three years.

Seven of the sixteen wards were uncontested.

After the election, the composition of the council was:

Party	Councillors	±	Aldermen	Total
Conservative	??	??	??	??
Liberal	??	??	??	??

== Election result ==
Liverpool local election result 1859
Party	Seats	Gains	Losses	Net gain/loss	Seats %	Votes %	Votes	+/−
Conservative	8				50%	49%	2,511	
Liberal	8				50%	51%	2,578	

Because seven of the sixteen seats were uncontested, these statistics should be taken in that context.

== Ward results ==
* - Retiring Councillor seeking re-election

=== Abercromby ===
No. 11 Abercromby
Party	Candidate	Votes	%	±%
Liberal	William Earle *	unopposed		
Registered electors				
Liberal hold		Swing		

=== Castle Street ===
No. 6 Castle Street
Party	Candidate	Votes	%	±%
Liberal	James Steains *	391	52%	
Conservative	Thomas Woodburn	355	48%	
Majority		36	4%	
Registered electors		1,127		
Turnout		746	66%	
Liberal hold		Swing		

Time	James Steains		Thomas Woodburn	
Time	Votes	%	Votes	%
10:00	88	64%	49	36%
11:00	172	59%	121	41%
12:00	245	56%	190	44%
13:00	291	54%	246	46%
14:00	319	54%	277	46%
15:00	353	53%	318	47%
16:00	391	52%	355	48%

=== Everton ===
No. 1 Everton
Party	Candidate	Votes	%	±%
Liberal	John Johnson Stitt *	665	53%	
Conservative	C.F. Carne	595	47%	
Majority		70	6%	
Registered electors		1,833		
Turnout		1,260	69%	
Liberal hold		Swing		

Time	John Johnson Stitt		C.F. Carne	
Time	Votes	%	Votes	%
10:00	171	65%	93	35%
11:00	267	67%	130	33%
12:00	351	58%	251	42%
13:00	458	56%	353	44%
14:00	542	53%	472	47%
15:00	603	53%	534	47%
16:00	665	53%	595	47%

=== Exchange ===
No. 5 Exchange
Party	Candidate	Votes	%	±%
Conservative	Charles Turner *	unopposed		
Registered electors				
Conservative hold		Swing		

=== Great George ===
No. 9 Great George
Party	Candidate	Votes	%	±%
Liberal	John Hays Wilson	unopposed		
Registered electors				
Liberal gain from		Swing		

=== Lime Street ===
No. 12 Lime Street
Party	Candidate	Votes	%	±%
Liberal	James Redcliffe Jeffrey *	275	90%	
Conservative	Mr. Wilson	30	10%	
Majority		245	80%	
Registered electors				
Turnout		305		
Liberal hold		Swing		

Time	James Redcliffe Jeffrey		John Wilson	
Time	Votes	%	Votes	%
10:00	110	89%	13	11%
11:00	117	84%	22	16%
12:00	222	89%	27	11%
13:00	273	90%	30	10%
14:00	273	90%	30%	10%

As there had been no votes cast between 1 p.m. and 2 p.m., the poll was closed.

=== North Toxteth ===
No. 16 North Toxteth
Party	Candidate	Votes	%	±%
Conservative	Joseph Gibbons Livingston	352	58%	
Liberal	W.H. Anthony	252	42%	
Majority		100	16%	
Registered electors		865		
Turnout		604	70%	
Conservative gain from Liberal		Swing		

Voting throughout the day.

Time	Joseph Gibbons Livingston		W.H. Anthony	
Time	Votes	%	Votes	%
10:00	58	51%	55	49%
11:00	124	55%	102	45%
12:00	176	56%	136	44%
13:00	222	56%	178	45%
14:00	280	57%	210	43%
15:00	317	57%	239	43%
16:00	352	58%	252	42%

=== Pitt Street ===
No. 8 Pitt Street
Party	Candidate	Votes	%	±%
Conservative	Walter Powell Jeffreys *	209	55%	
Liberal	James Steel	174	45%	
Majority		35	10%	
Registered electors		509		
Turnout		383	75%	
Conservative hold		Swing		

Time	Walter Powell Jeffreys		James Steel	
Time	Votes	%	Votes	%
10:00	53	54%	45	46%
11:00	114	55%	95	45%
12:00	141	54%	121	46%
13:00	173	56%	136	44%
14:00	181	55%	149	45%
15:00	203	54%	170	46%
16:00	209	55%	174	45%

=== Rodney Street ===
No. 10 Rodney Street
Party	Candidate	Votes	%	±%
Conservative	James Aspinall Tobin *	unopposed		
Registered electors				
Conservative hold		Swing		

=== St. Anne Street ===
No. 13 St. Anne Street
Party	Candidate	Votes	%	±%
Conservative	George Nickson	262	62%	
Liberal	Clarke Aspinall	161	38%	
Majority		101	24%	N/A
Registered electors		565		
Turnout		423	75%	
Conservative gain from Liberal		Swing		

Time	George Nickson		Clarke Aspinall	
Time	Votes	%	Votes	%
10:00	84	65%	46	35%
11:00	147	64%	83	36%
12:00	189	64%	105	36%
13:00	220	63%	128	37%
14:00	248	64%	142	36%
15:00	256	63%	153	37%
16:00	266	62%	161	38%

=== St. Paul's ===
No. 4 St. Paul's
Party	Candidate	Votes	%	±%
Liberal	Oliver Holden *	unopposed		
Registered electors				
Liberal hold		Swing		

=== St. Peter's ===
No. 7 St. Peter's
Party	Candidate	Votes	%	±%
Liberal	Henry Christie Beloe	331	54%	
Conservative	James Holme *	283	46%	
Majority		48	8%	N/A
Registered electors		875		
Turnout		614	70%	
Liberal gain from Conservative		Swing		

Time	Henry Christie Beloe		James Holme	
Time	Votes	%	Votes	%
10:00	90	59%	63	41%
11:00	168	55%	135	45%
12:00	228	56%	174	44%
13:00	261	55%	216	45%
14:00	280	55%	226	45%
15:00	297	54%	251	46%
16:00	331	54%	283	46%

=== Scotland ===
No. 2 Scotland
Party	Candidate	Votes	%	±%
Liberal	John Woodruff *	unopposed		
Registered electors				
Liberal hold		Swing		

=== South Toxteth ===
No. 15 South Toxteth
Party	Candidate	Votes	%	±%
Conservative	James Robertson *	272	55%	
Liberal	Alexander Miller	222	45%	
Majority		50	10%	
Registered electors		1,207		
Turnout		494	41%	
Conservative hold		Swing		

Time	James Robertson		Alexander Miller	
Time	Votes	%	Votes	%
10:00	55	50%	56	50%
11:00	100	52%	94	48%
12:00	140	54%	118	46%
13:00	180	54%	156	46%
14:00	213	54%	185	46%
15:00	245	55%	200	45%
16:00	272	55%	222	45%

=== Vauxhall ===
No. 3 Vauxhall
Party	Candidate	Votes	%	±%
Conservative	John Shimmin	153	59%	
Liberal	Samuel Cearns	107	41%	
Majority		46	18%	N/A
Registered electors		653		
Turnout		260	40%	
Conservative gain from Liberal		Swing		

Time	John Shimmin		Samuel Cearns	
Time	Votes	%	Votes	%
10:00	72	57%	55	43%
11:00	91	61%	59	39%
12:00	106	58%	76	42%
13:00	116	58%	85	42%
14:00	133	60%	89	40%
15:00	139	58%	100	42%
16:00	153	59%	107	41%

=== West Derby ===
No. 14 West Derby
Party	Candidate	Votes	%	±%
Liberal	Francis Anderson Clint *	unopposed		
Registered electors				
Liberal hold		Swing		

== Aldermanic Elections ==
At the meeting of the Council on 9 November 1859, the terms of office of eight alderman expired.

The following eight were elected as Aldermen by the Council (Aldermen and Councillors) on 10 November 1859 for a term of six years.

* - re-elected aldermen.

Party	Alderman
Conservative	R C Gardner *
Conservative	Samuel Holme *
Conservative	James Parker *
Liberal	John Woodruff
Conservative	Joseph Cooper *
Conservative	John Bramley-Moore *
Conservative	John Stewart
Conservative	Thomas Bold *

== By-elections ==
=== No. 2, Scotland, 18 November 1859 ===
Caused by the election of Councillor John Woodruff (Liberal, Scotland, elected 1 November 1859) as an alderman by the Council on 9 November 1859.

No. 2 Scotland
Party	Candidate	Votes	%	±%
Liberal	Clarke Aspinall			
Majority				
Registered electors				
Turnout				
Liberal hold		Swing		

=== No. 15, South Toxteth, 18 November 1859 ===
Caused by the election of Councillor John Stewart (Conservative, South Toxteth, elected 1 November 1857) as an alderman by the Council on 9 November 1859.

No. 15 South Toxteth
Party	Candidate	Votes	%	±%
Conservative	Joseph Steel	unopposed		
Registered electors		1,207		
Conservative hold		Swing		

== See also ==
Liverpool City Council

Liverpool Town Council elections 1835 - 1879

Liverpool City Council elections 1880–present

Mayors and Lord Mayors of Liverpool 1207 to present

History of local government in England
