= 1868 Liverpool Town Council election =

English local election

- November 2, 1868

16 seats were up for election: one seat for each of the 16 wards 33 (incl. Aldermen) seats needed for a majority

Elections to Liverpool Town Council were held on Monday 2 November 1868. One third of the council seats were up for election, the term of office of each councillor being three years.

Eight of the sixteen wards were uncontested.

After the election, the composition of the council was:

Party	Councillors	±	Aldermen	Total
Conservative	??	??	16	??
Liberal	??	??	0	??

== Election result ==
Liverpool local election result 1868
Party	Seats	Gains	Losses	Net gain/loss	Seats %	Votes %	Votes	+/−
Conservative								
Liberal								

Because of the large number of uncontested seats, these statistics should be taken in that context.

== Ward results ==
* - Retiring Councillor seeking re-election

=== Abercromby ===
No. 11 Abercromby
Party	Candidate	Votes	%	±%
	Philip Henry Holt	unopposed		
Registered electors				
		Swing		

=== Castle Street ===
No. 6 Castle Street
Party	Candidate	Votes	%	±%
Liberal	Thomas Avison	unopposed		
Registered electors				
Liberal hold		Swing		

=== Everton ===
No. 1 Everton
Party	Candidate	Votes	%	±%
Conservative	Edward Whitley *	unopposed		
Registered electors				
Conservative hold		Swing		

=== Exchange ===
No. 5 Exchange
Party	Candidate	Votes	%	±%
Liberal	John Johnson Stitt	unopposed		
Registered electors				
Liberal hold		Swing		

=== Great George ===
No. 9 Great George
Party	Candidate	Votes	%	±%
Liberal	John Hays Wilson	unopposed		
Registered electors				
Liberal hold		Swing		

=== Lime Street ===
No. 12 Lime Street
Party	Candidate	Votes	%	±%
Liberal	William Bottomley Bairstow *	unopposed		
Registered electors				
Liberal hold		Swing		

=== North Toxteth ===
No. 16 North Toxteth
Party	Candidate	Votes	%	±%
Conservative	Joseph Gibbons Livingston	417	56%	
Liberal	John Philips	344	45%	
Majority		73		
Registered electors				
Turnout		761		
Conservative gain from		Swing		

=== Pitt Street ===
No. 8 Pitt Street
Party	Candidate	Votes	%	±%
Conservative	William Bower Forwood	189	59%	
Liberal	James Steele	134	41%	
Majority		56	18%	N/A
Registered electors				
Turnout		323		
Conservative gain from Liberal		Swing		

=== Rodney Street ===
No. 10 Rodney Street
Party	Candidate	Votes	%	±%
Liberal	David Campbell	445	56%	
Conservative	Dr. Thomas Dawson	347	44%	
Majority		98	12%	N/A
Registered electors				
Turnout		792		
Liberal gain from Conservative		Swing		

=== St. Anne Street ===
No. 13 St. Anne Street
Party	Candidate	Votes	%	±%
Conservative	James Denton	229	51%	
Liberal	William Dawbarn	217	49%	
Majority		12	2%	
Registered electors				
Turnout		446		
Conservative hold		Swing		

=== St. Paul's ===
No. 4 St. Paul's
Party	Candidate	Votes	%	±%
Conservative	Oliver Holden	233	53%	
Liberal	Peter George Heyworth	205	47%	
Majority		28	6%	N/A
Registered electors				
Turnout		438		
Conservative gain from Liberal		Swing		

=== St. Peter's ===
No. 7 St. Peter's
Party	Candidate	Votes	%	±%
Liberal	Henry Christie Beloe	unopposed		
Registered electors				
Liberal gain from		Swing		

=== Scotland ===
No. 2 Scotland
Party	Candidate	Votes	%	±%
Liberal	James Fairhurst	442	58%	
Conservative	Walter Pierce	322	42%	
Majority		120	16%	N/A
Registered electors				
Turnout		764		
Liberal gain from Conservative		Swing		

=== South Toxteth ===
No. 15 South Toxteth
Party	Candidate	Votes	%	±%
Conservative	John Parratt	544	80%	
Liberal	Horace Seymour Alpass	134	20%	
Majority		410	60%	N/A
Registered electors				
Turnout		678		
Conservative gain from Liberal		Swing		

=== Vauxhall ===
No. 3 Vauxhall
Party	Candidate	Votes	%	±%
Liberal	John Yates *	unopposed		
Registered electors				
Liberal hold		Swing		

=== West Derby ===
No. 14 West Derby
Party	Candidate	Votes	%	±%
Liberal	Francis Anderson Clint	668	57%	
Conservative	Thomas Page	497	43%	
Majority		171	14%	N/A
Registered electors				
Turnout		1,165		
Liberal gain from Conservative		Swing		

== Aldermanic Elections ==
At the meeting of the Council on 9 November 1868, the terms of office of eight alderman expired.

The following eight were elected as Aldermen by the Council (Aldermen and Councillors) on 9 November 1868 for a term of six years.

* - re-elected aldermen.

Party	Alderman
Conservative	William Bennett *
Conservative	Thomas Dover *
Conservative	Raymond William Houghton *
Conservative	Joseph Hubback *
Conservative	Joseph Gibbons Livingston
Conservative	John Grant Morris *
Conservative	Thomas Rigby
Conservative	John Hayward Turner *

== By-elections ==
=== No. 3, Vauxhall, ===
Caused by the election of Councillor Thomas Rigby (Conservative, Vauxhall, elected 1 November 1867) as an Alderman on 9 November 1868.

No. 3 Vauxhall
Party	Candidate	Votes	%	±%
Majority				
Registered electors				
Turnout				
		Swing		

=== No. 12, Lime Street, ===
Following the death of Councillor William Bottomley Bairstow (Liberal, Lime Street, elected 2nd November 1868) which was reported to the Council on 6 January 1869.

No. 12 Lime Street
Party	Candidate	Votes	%	±%
	Henry Hornby			
Majority				
Registered electors				
Turnout				
	gain from	Swing		

=== No. 5, Exchange, ===
The death of alderman Joseph Cooper J.P. Was reported to the Council on 10 February 1869. Councillor James Tyrer (Conservative, elected for the Exchange ward on 1 November 1867) was elected as an alderman by the Council on 17 February 1869.

No. 5 Exchange
Party	Candidate	Votes	%	±%
	Stephen Barker Guion			
Majority				
Registered electors				
Turnout				
	gain from	Swing		

=== No. 15, South Toxteth, ===
The death of Councillor William Cowley Miller (Liberal, elected for the South Toxteth ward on 1 November 1866) was reported to the Council on 2 June 1869.

No. 15 South Toxteth
Party	Candidate	Votes	%	±%
	Richard Allison Watson			
Majority				
Registered electors				
Turnout				
	gain from	Swing		

== See also ==
- Liverpool City Council
- Liverpool Town Council elections 1835 - 1879
- Liverpool City Council elections 1880–present
- Mayors and Lord Mayors of Liverpool 1207 to present
- History of local government in England
