= 1862 Liverpool Town Council election =

English local election

- November 1, 1862

16 seats were up for election: one seat for each of the 16 wards 33 (incl. Aldermen) seats needed for a majority

Elections to Liverpool Town Council were held on Wednesday 1 November 1862. One third of the council seats were up for election, the term of office of each councillor being three years.

Eleven of the sixteen wards were uncontested.

This was the first year that the 'Proceedings of the Council' were printed.

After the election, the composition of the council was:

Party	Councillors	±	Aldermen	Total
Conservative	??	??	16	??
Liberal	??	??	0	??

== Election result ==
Liverpool local election result 1862
Party	Seats	Gains	Losses	Net gain/loss	Seats %	Votes %	Votes	+/−
Conservative								
Liberal								

Because eleven of the sixteen seats were uncontested, these statistics should be taken in that context.

== Ward results ==
* - Retiring Councillor seeking re-election

=== Abercromby ===
No. 11 Abercromby
Party	Candidate	Votes	%	±%
	William Earle *	unopposed		
Registered electors				
		Swing		

=== Castle Street ===
No. 6 Castle Street
Party	Candidate	Votes	%	±%
Conservative	James Maxwell	356	63%	
Liberal	John Yates the younger	205	37%	
Majority		151	26%	N/A
Registered electors				
Turnout		561		
Conservative gain from Liberal		Swing		

=== Everton ===
No. 1 Everton
Party	Candidate	Votes	%	±%
Liberal	John Johnson Stitt *	806	52%	
Conservative	Joseph Hubback	734	48%	
Majority		72	4%	
Registered electors				
Turnout		1,540		
Liberal hold		Swing		

=== Exchange ===
No. 5 Exchange
Party	Candidate	Votes	%	±%
Conservative	Charles Turner *	unopposed		
Registered electors				
Conservative hold		Swing		

=== Great George ===
No. 9 Great George
Party	Candidate	Votes	%	±%
Liberal	John Hays Wilson *	unopposed		
Registered electors				
Liberal hold		Swing		

=== Lime Street ===
No. 12 Lime Street
Party	Candidate	Votes	%	±%
Conservative	James Rothwell Cooper	378	52%	
Liberal	James Reddecliff Jeffrey	346	48%	
Majority		32	4%	N/A
Registered electors				
Turnout		724		
Conservative gain from Liberal		Swing		

=== North Toxteth ===
No. 16 North Toxteth
Party	Candidate	Votes	%	±%
Conservative	Joseph Gibbons Livingston*	418	55%	
Liberal	Hugh Almond	343	45%	
Majority		75	10%	
Registered electors				
Turnout		761		
Conservative hold		Swing		

=== Pitt Street ===
No. 8 Pitt Street
Party	Candidate	Votes	%	±%
Conservative	Walter Powell Jeffreys *	unopposed		
Registered electors				
Conservative hold		Swing		

=== Rodney Street ===
No. 10 Rodney Street
Party	Candidate	Votes	%	±%
Conservative	James Aspinall Tobin *	unopposed		
Registered electors				
Conservative hold		Swing		

=== St. Anne Street ===
No. 13 St. Anne Street
Party	Candidate	Votes	%	±%
Conservative	George Nickson *	unopposed		
Registered electors				
Conservative hold		Swing		

=== St. Paul's ===
No. 4 St. Paul's
Party	Candidate	Votes	%	±%
Liberal	Oliver Holden *	unopposed		
Registered electors				
Liberal hold		Swing		

=== St. Peter's ===
No. 7 St. Peter's
Party	Candidate	Votes	%	±%
Liberal	Henry Christie Beloe *	unopposed		
Registered electors				
Liberal hold		Swing		

=== Scotland ===
No. 2 Scotland
Party	Candidate	Votes	%	±%
	Clarke Aspinall	unopposed		
Registered electors				
	gain from	Swing		

=== South Toxteth ===
No. 15 South Toxteth
Party	Candidate	Votes	%	±%
Conservative	Henry Threlfall Wilson	417	57%	
Liberal	Maurice Williams	311	43%	
Majority		106	14%	
Registered electors				
Turnout		728		
Conservative hold		Swing		

=== Vauxhall ===
No. 3 Vauxhall
Party	Candidate	Votes	%	±%
Conservative	John Shimmin *	unopposed		
Registered electors				
Conservative hold		Swing		

=== West Derby ===
No. 14 West Derby
Party	Candidate	Votes	%	±%
Liberal	Francis Anderson Clint *	unopposed		
Registered electors				
Liberal hold		Swing		

== Aldermanic Elections ==
At the meeting of the Council on 10 November 1862, the terms of office of eight alderman expired.

The following eight were elected as Aldermen by the Council (Aldermen and Councillors) on 10 November 1862 for a term of six years.

* - re-elected aldermen.

Party	Alderman
Conservative	William Bennett *
Conservative	Thomas Dover *
Conservative	John Farnworth
Conservative	Raymond William Houghton *
Conservative	Joseph Hubback
Conservative	John Grant Morris *
Conservative	William Preston *
Conservative	John Hayward Turner *

== By-elections ==
=== No. 15, South Toxteth, November 1862 ===
Caused by the election of Councillor John Farnworth (Conservative, South Toxteth, elected 1 November 1861) by the Council as an alderman on 10 November 1862.

No. 15 South Toxteth
Party	Candidate	Votes	%	±%
Majority				
Registered electors				
Turnout				
		Swing		

=== No. 1, Everton & Kirkdale, November 1862 ===
Caused by the election of Councillor Maurice Hubback (Conservative, Everton & Kirkdale, elected 1 November 1862) by the Council as an alderman on 10 November 1862.

No. 1 Everton
Party	Candidate	Votes	%	±%
Majority				
Registered electors				
Turnout				
	Liberal hold	Swing		

=== No. ?, November 1862 ===
Caused by the election of Councillor John Grant Morris (Party?, ward?, elected ???) by the Council as an alderman on 10 November 1862.

== See also ==
- Liverpool City Council
- Liverpool Town Council elections 1835 - 1879
- Liverpool City Council elections 1880–present
- Mayors and Lord Mayors of Liverpool 1207 to present
- History of local government in England
