= 1865 Liverpool Town Council election =

English local election

- 1 November 1865

16 seats were up for election: one seat for each of the 16 wards 33 (incl. Aldermen) seats needed for a majority

Elections to Liverpool Town Council were held on Wednesday 1 November 1865. One-third of the council seats were up for election, the term of office of each councillor being three years.

Seven of the sixteen wards were uncontested.

After the election, the composition of the council was:

Party	Councillors	±	Aldermen	Total
Conservative	??	??	??	??
Liberal	??	??	??	??

== Election result ==
Liverpool local election result 1865
Party	Seats	Gains	Losses	Net gain/loss	Seats %	Votes %	Votes	+/−
Conservative	7	1	4	-3	44%	47%	2,376	
Liberal	9	4	1	+3	56%	53%	2,680	

Because nine of the sixteen wards were uncontested, these statistics should be taken in that context.

== Ward results ==
* - Retiring Councillor seeking re-election

=== Abercromby ===
No. 11 Abercromby
Party	Candidate	Votes	%	±%
Liberal	Philip Henry Holt	unopposed		
Registered electors				
Liberal hold		Swing		

=== Castle Street ===
No. 6 Castle Street
Party	Candidate	Votes	%	±%
Liberal	Thomas Chilton	398	55%	
Conservative	Peter Bancroft	323	45%	
Majority		75	10%	N/A
Registered electors				
Turnout		721		
Liberal gain from Conservative		Swing		

Time	Thomas Chilton		Peter Bancroft	
Time	Votes	%	Votes	%
10:00	59	54%	50	46%
11:00	152	59%	107	41%
12:00	218	55%	179	45%
13:00	260	55%	216	45%
14:00	311	56%	248	44%
15:00	365	55%	301	45%
16:00	398	55%	323	45%

=== Everton ===
No. 1 Everton
Party	Candidate	Votes	%	±%
Conservative	Edward Whitley	1,002	53%	
Liberal	John Johnson Stitt *	894	47%	
Majority		108	6%	N/A
Registered electors				
Turnout		1,896		
Conservative gain from Liberal		Swing		

Time	Edward Whitley		John Johnson Stitt	
Time	Votes	%	Votes	%
9:00	138	58%	102	42%
10:00	174	58%	125	42%
10:45	389	60%	262	40%
12:00	566	58%	407	42%
13:00	698	57%	531	43%
14:00	826	55%	685	45%
15:00	932	53%	685	45%
16:00	1,002	53%	894	47%

=== Exchange ===
No. 5 Exchange
Party	Candidate	Votes	%	±%
Conservative	John Swainson	unopposed		
Registered electors				
Conservative hold		Swing		

=== Great George ===
No. 9 Great George
Party	Candidate	Votes	%	±%
Liberal	John Haye Wilson *	235	53%	
Conservative	James Sykes	208	47%	
Majority		27	6%	
Registered electors				
Turnout		443		
Liberal hold		Swing		

Time	John Haye Wilson		James Sykes	
Time	Votes	%	Votes	%
10:00	76	48%	83	52%
11:00	143	56%	113	44%
13:00	185	53%	163	47%
14:00	196	52%	183	48%
15:00	223	53%	196	47%
16:00	233	51%	223	49%

=== Lime Street ===
No. 12 Lime Street
Party	Candidate	Votes	%	±%
Liberal	William Bottomley Bairstow	317	58%	
Conservative	J. Lunt	227	42%	
Majority		90	16%	N/A
Registered electors				
Turnout		544		
Liberal gain from Conservative		Swing		

Time	William Bottomley Bairstow		J. Lunt	
Time	Votes	%	Votes	%
10:00	75	62%	46	38%
11:00	143	66%	75	34%
12:00	181	60%	120	40%
13:00	238	59%	163	41%
14:00	259	59%	178	41%
15:00	291	59%	204	41%
16:00	317	58%	227	42%

=== North Toxteth ===
No. 16 North Toxteth
Party	Candidate	Votes	%	±%
Conservative	Joseph Gibbons Livingston *	unopposed		
Registered electors				
Conservative hold		Swing		

=== Pitt Street ===
No. 8 Pitt Street
Party	Candidate	Votes	%	±%
Conservative	R. C. Janion	unopposed		
Registered electors				
Conservative hold		Swing		

=== Rodney Street ===
No. 10 Rodney Street
Party	Candidate	Votes	%	±%
Liberal	Charles J. English	496	62%	
Conservative	R. Galloway	299	38%	
Majority		197	24%	N/A
Registered electors				
Turnout		795		
Liberal gain from Conservative		Swing		

Time	Charles J. English		R. Galloway	
Time	Votes	%	Votes	%
10:00	100	72%	39	28%
11:00	189	73%	70	27%
12:00	338	68%	146	32%
13:00	417	65%	215	35%
14:00	450	63%	270	38%
15:00	487	62%	293	38%
16:00	496	62%	299	38%

=== St. Anne Street ===
No. 13 St. Anne Street
Party	Candidate	Votes	%	±%
Conservative	Joseph Bennion	226	52%	
Liberal	James Fairhurst	211	48%	
Majority		15	4%	
Registered electors				
Turnout		437		
Conservative hold		Swing		

Time	Joseph Bennion		James Fairhurst	
Time	Votes	%	Votes	%
10:00	60	56%	48	44%
11:00	88	53%	79	47%
12:00	125	54%	107	46%
13:00	151	52%	138	48%
14:00	181	53%	159	47%
15:00	206	53%	185	47%
16:00	224	51%	212	49%

=== St. Paul's ===
No. 4 St. Paul's
Party	Candidate	Votes	%	±%
Conservative	Oliver Holden	unopposed		
Registered electors				
Conservative hold		Swing		

=== St. Peter's ===
No. 7 St. Peter's
Party	Candidate	Votes	%	±%
Liberal	Henry Christie Beloe *	unopposed		
Registered electors				
Liberal hold		Swing		

=== Scotland ===
No. 2 Scotland
Party	Candidate	Votes	%	±%
Liberal	Clarke Aspinall *	unopposed		
Registered electors				
Liberal hold		Swing		

=== South Toxteth ===
No. 15 South Toxteth
Party	Candidate	Votes	%	±%
Conservative	Henry Threlfall Wilson *	unopposed		
Registered electors				
Conservative hold		Swing		

=== Vauxhall ===
No. 3 Vauxhall
Party	Candidate	Votes	%	±%
Liberal	John Yates	129	59%	
Conservative	R. R. Minton	91	41%	
Majority		38	18%	N/A
Registered electors				
Turnout		220		
Liberal gain from Conservative		Swing		

Time	John Yates		R. R. Minton	
Time	Votes	%	Votes	%
10:00	34	58%	25	42%
11:00	58	58%	42	42%
12:00	75	59%	52	41%
13:00	91	59%	64	41%
14:00	107	59%	75	41%
15:00	115	59%	81	41%
16:00	129	59%	91	41%

=== West Derby ===
No. 14 West Derby
Party	Candidate	Votes	%	±%
Liberal	Francis Anderson Clint *	unopposed		
Registered electors				
Liberal hold		Swing		

== Aldermanic Elections ==
At the meeting of the council on 9 November 1865, the terms of office of eight alderman expired.

The following eight were elected as Aldermen by the council (Aldermen and Councillors) on 9 November 1865 for a term of six years.

* - re-elected aldermen.

Party	Alderman
Conservative	Thomas Bold *
Conservative	James Parker *
Conservative	Joseph Cooper *
Conservative	Richard Cardwell Gardner *
Conservative	John Woodruff *
Conservative	John Stewart *
Conservative	Richard Sheil
Conservative	Charles Turner

== See also ==
- Liverpool City Council
- Liverpool Town Council elections 1835 - 1879
- Liverpool City Council elections 1880–present
- Mayors and Lord Mayors of Liverpool 1207 to present
- History of local government in England
