= 1871 Liverpool Town Council election =

English local election

- 1 November 1871

16 seats were up for election: one seat for each of the 16 wards 33 (incl. Aldermen) seats needed for a majority

Elections to Liverpool Town Council were held on Monday 1 November 1871. One third of the council seats were up for election, the term of office of each councillor being three years.

Ten of the sixteen wards were uncontested.

After the election, the composition of the council was:

Party	Councillors	±	Aldermen	Total
Conservative	??	??	??	??
Liberal	??	??	??	??

== Election result ==
Liverpool local election result 1871
Party	Seats	Gains	Losses	Net gain/loss	Seats %	Votes %	Votes	+/−
Conservative	9	2	0	+2	56%	53%	4,243	
Liberal	7	0	2	-2	44%	47%	3,796	

Because of the large number of uncontested seats, these statistics should be taken in that context.

== Ward results ==
* - Retiring Councillor seeking re-election

=== Abercromby ===
No. 11 Abercromby
Party	Candidate	Votes	%	±%
Conservative	Dr. George Gill	886	53%	
Liberal	Edgar Musgrove	797	47%	
Majority		89	6%	N/A
Registered electors				
Turnout		1,683		
Conservative gain from Liberal		Swing		

=== Castle Street ===
No. 6 Castle Street
Party	Candidate	Votes	%	±%
Liberal	Thomas Avison *	unopposed		
Registered electors				
Liberal hold		Swing		

=== Everton ===
No. 1 Everton
Party	Candidate	Votes	%	±%
Conservative	Edward Whitley *	unopposed		
Registered electors				
Conservative hold		Swing		

=== Exchange ===
No. 5 Exchange
Party	Candidate	Votes	%	±%
Conservative	Joseph Armstrong	749	58%	
Liberal	John Johnson Stitt *	549	42%	
Majority		200	16%	N/A
Registered electors				
Turnout		1,298		
Conservative gain from Liberal		Swing		

=== Great George ===
No. 9 Great George
Party	Candidate	Votes	%	±%
Liberal	John Hays Wilson *	unopposed		
Registered electors				
Liberal hold		Swing		

=== Lime Street ===
No. 12 Lime Street
Party	Candidate	Votes	%	±%
Conservative	Henry Hornby	650	54%	
Liberal	Samuel Pack	547	46%	
Majority		103	8%	N/A
Registered electors		1,717		
Turnout		1,197	70%	
Conservative gain from Liberal		Swing		

=== North Toxteth ===
No. 16 North Toxteth
Party	Candidate	Votes	%	±%
Conservative	Arthur Bower Forwood	unopposed		
Registered electors				
Conservative hold		Swing		

=== Pitt Street ===
No. 8 Pitt Street
Party	Candidate	Votes	%	±%
Conservative	William Bower Forwood *	unopposed		
Registered electors				
Conservative hold		Swing		

=== Rodney Street ===
No. 10 Rodney Street
Party	Candidate	Votes	%	±%
Liberal	David Campbell *	767	54%	
Conservative	John Atkinson	662	46%	
Majority		105	8%	
Registered electors		2,401		
Turnout		1,429	60%	
Liberal hold		Swing		

=== St. Anne Street ===
No. 13 St. Anne Street
Party	Candidate	Votes	%	±%
Conservative	James Denton *	653	54%	
Liberal	Edwin Hughes	567	46%	
Majority		86	8%	
Registered electors				
Turnout		1,220		
Conservative hold		Swing		

=== St. Paul's ===
No. 4 St. Paul's
Party	Candidate	Votes	%	±%
Conservative	Robert Wheeler Preston	643	53%	
Liberal	George Mayall jun.	569	47%	
Majority		74	6%	
Registered electors		1,613		
Turnout		1,212	75%	
Conservative hold		Swing		

=== St. Peter's ===
No. 7 St. Peter's
Party	Candidate	Votes	%	±%
Liberal	Henry Christie Beloe *	unopposed		
Registered electors				
Liberal hold		Swing		

=== Scotland ===
No. 2 Scotland
Party	Candidate	Votes	%	±%
Liberal	James Faihurst *	unopposed		
Registered electors				
Liberal hold		Swing		

=== South Toxteth ===
No. 15 South Toxteth
Party	Candidate	Votes	%	±%
Liberal	John Parratt *	unopposed		
Registered electors				
Liberal hold		Swing		

=== Vauxhall ===
No. 3 Vauxhall
Party	Candidate	Votes	%	±%
Liberal	John Yates *	unopposed		
Registered electors				
Liberal hold		Swing		

=== West Derby ===
No. 14 West Derby
Party	Candidate	Votes	%	±%
Liberal	Francis Anderson Clint *	unopposed		
Registered electors				
Liberal hold		Swing		

== Aldermanic Election ==
At the meeting of the Council on 9 November 1871, the terms of office of eight alderman expired. The following eight were elected as Aldermen by the Council (Aldermen and Councillors) on 9 November 1871 for a term of six years.

* - re-elected aldermen.

Party	Alderman
Conservative	Richard Cardwell Gardner *
Conservative	Bernard Hall *
Conservative	Oliver Holden *
Conservative	Peter Thomson *
Conservative	Charles Turner MP *
Conservative	James Tyrer *
Conservative	John Weightman *
Conservative	John Woodruff *

== By-elections ==
=== No. 15, South Toxteth, 30 December 1871 ===
The death of Alderman Raymond William Houghton JP was reported to the Council on 20 December 1871.

Councillor Andrew Barclay Walker (Conservative, South Toxteth, elected 1 November 1870) was elected as an alderman by the Council (Aldermen and Councillors) on 20 December 1871.

No. 15 South Toxteth
Party	Candidate	Votes	%	±%
Liberal	Isaac Jackson	unopposed		
Registered electors				
Liberal hold		Swing		

=== No. 4, St. Paul's, 20 March 1872 ===
The death of Alderman John Hayward Turner JP was reported to the Council on 6 March 1872.

William Barton (Conservative, St. Paul's, elected 1 November 1869) was elected as an Alderman by the Council (Councillors and Aldermen) on 11 March 1872.

No. 4 St. Paul's
Party	Candidate	Votes	%	±%
Liberal	George Mayall the younger	unopposed		
Registered electors		1,613		
Liberal gain from Conservative		Swing		

== See also ==
- Liverpool City Council
- Liverpool Town Council elections 1835 - 1879
- Liverpool City Council elections 1880–present
- Mayors and Lord Mayors of Liverpool 1207 to present
- History of local government in England
