= 1855 Liverpool Town Council election =

1855 English local government election

← 1854	November 1, 1855	1856 →

16 seats were up for election: one seat for each of the 16 wards 33 (incl. Aldermen) seats needed for a majority

Elections to Liverpool Town Council were held on Thursday 1 November 1855. One third of the council seats were up for election, the term of office of each councillor being three years.

Nine of the sixteen wards were uncontested.

After the election, the composition of the council was:

Party	Councillors	±	Aldermen	Total
Conservative	??	??	??	??
Reformers	??	??	??	??

== Election result ==
Liverpool local election result 1855
Party	Seats	Gains	Losses	Net gain/loss	Seats %	Votes %	Votes	+/−
Conservative								
Whig								

== Ward results ==
* - Retiring Councillor seeking re-election

=== Abercromby ===
No. 11 Abercromby
Party	Candidate	Votes	%	±%
Whig	Robertson Gladstone *	Unopposed	N/A	N/A
Registered electors				
Whig hold				

=== Castle Street ===
No. 6 Castle Street
Party	Candidate	Votes	%	±%
Conservative	Joseph Gibbons Livingston	298	54%	
Whig	Thomas Avison *	252	46%	
Majority		40	8%	N/A
Registered electors				
Turnout		550		
Conservative gain from Whig		Swing		

=== Everton ===
No. 1 Everton
Party	Candidate	Votes	%	±%
Conservative	Thomas Darnley Anderson *	unopposed		
Registered electors				
Conservative hold		Swing		

=== Exchange ===
No. 5 Exchange
Party	Candidate	Votes	%	±%
Conservative	James Tyrer *	unopposed		
Registered electors				
Conservative hold		Swing		

=== Great George ===
No. 9 Great George
Party	Candidate	Votes	%	±%
Conservative	John Lawrence	232	59%	
Whig	John Rogers	159	41%	
Majority		73	18%	
Registered electors				
Turnout		391		
Conservative hold		Swing		

=== Lime Street ===
No. 12 Lime Street
Party	Candidate	Votes	%	±%
Whig	James Allanson Picton *	Unopposed	N/A	N/A
Registered electors				
Whig hold				

=== North Toxteth ===
No. 16 North Toxteth
Party	Candidate	Votes	%	±%
Conservative	Hilton Halhead *	313	71%	
Whig	William Evans	129	29%	
Majority		184	42%	
Registered electors		941		
Turnout		442	47%	
Conservative hold		Swing		

=== Pitt Street ===
No. 8 Pitt Street
Party	Candidate	Votes	%	±%
Conservative	William Mann	unopposed		
Registered electors				
Conservative hold		Swing		

=== Rodney Street ===
No. 10 Rodney Street
Party	Candidate	Votes	%	±%
Conservative	John Barnes Brancker *	unopposed		
Registered electors				
Conservative hold		Swing		

=== St. Anne Street ===
No. 13 St. Anne Street
Party	Candidate	Votes	%	±%
Whig	Thomas Llewelyn Hodson *	unopposed		
Registered electors				
Whig hold		Swing		

=== St. Paul's ===
No. 4 St. Paul's
Party	Candidate	Votes	%	±%
Conservative	Thomas Godfrey	222	55%	
Whig	J. B. Spence	179	45%	
Majority		43	10%	
Registered electors		522		
Turnout		401	77%	
Conservative hold		Swing		

=== St. Peter's ===
No. 7 St. Peter's
Party	Candidate	Votes	%	±%
Conservative	John Charles Fernihough *	unopposed		
Registered electors				
Conservative hold		Swing		

=== Scotland ===
No. 2 Scotland
Party	Candidate	Votes	%	±%
Whig	John Woodruff *	Unopposed	N/A	N/A
Registered electors				
Whig hold				

=== South Toxteth ===
No. 15 South Toxteth
Party	Candidate	Votes	%	±%
Conservative	John Farnworth	267	76%	
Whig	W. F. McGregor	83	24%	
Majority		184	52%	
Registered electors		651		
Turnout		350	54%	
Conservative hold		Swing		

=== Vauxhall ===
No. 3 Vauxhall
Party	Candidate	Votes	%	±%
	Roger Haydock	145	51%	
	Thomas Chalmer	138	49%	
Majority		7		
Registered electors		394		
Turnout		283	72%	
	gain from	Swing		

=== West Derby ===
No. 14 West Derby
Party	Candidate	Votes	%	±%
Whig	John Aikin	335	54%	
Conservative	Arthur Henderson *	284	46%	
Majority		51	8%	N/A
Registered electors		1,054		
Turnout		619	59%	
Whig gain from Conservative		Swing		

== See also ==
- Liverpool Town Council elections 1835 - 1879
- Liverpool City Council elections 1880–present
- Mayors and Lord Mayors of Liverpool 1207 to present
- History of local government in England
