= 1853 Liverpool Town Council election =

1853 UK local government election

- November 1, 1853

16 seats were up for election: one seat for each of the 16 wards 33 (incl. Aldermen) seats needed for a majority

Elections to Liverpool Town Council were held on Thursday 1 November 1853. One third of the council seats were up for election, the term of office of each councillor being three years.

Eleven of the sixteen wards were uncontested.

After the election, the composition of the council was:

Party	Councillors	±	Aldermen	Total
Conservative	??	??	??	??
Reformers	??	??	??	??

== Election result ==
Liverpool local election result 1853
Party	Seats	Gains	Losses	Net gain/loss	Seats %	Votes %	Votes	+/−
Conservative								
Whig								

== Ward results ==
* – Retiring Councillor seeking re-election

=== Abercromby ===
No. 11 Abercromby
Party	Candidate	Votes	%	±%
	Richard Cardwell Gardner *	369	75%	
	John H. Brancken ?	124	24%	
Majority		245		
Registered electors				
Turnout		493		
	gain from	Swing		

=== Castle Street ===
No. 6 Castle Street
Party	Candidate	Votes	%	±%
Conservative	George Holt *	2	Unopposed	N/A
Registered electors				
Conservative hold				

=== Everton ===
No. 1 Everton
Party	Candidate	Votes	%	±%
Conservative	Samuel Moulsdale Mellor *	6	Unopposed	N/A
Registered electors				
Conservative hold				

=== Exchange ===
No. 5 Exchange
Party	Candidate	Votes	%	±%
Conservative	Charles Turner *	5	Unopposed	N/A
Registered electors				
Conservative hold				

=== Great George ===
No. 9 Great George
Party	Candidate	Votes	%	±%
Conservative	Alexander Shand	6	Unopposed	N/A
Registered electors				
Conservative hold				

=== Lime Street ===
No. 12 Lime Street
Party	Candidate	Votes	%	±%
Conservative	John Buck Lloyd *	11	Unopposed	N/A
Registered electors				
Conservative hold				

=== North Toxteth ===
No. 16 North Toxteth
Party	Candidate	Votes	%	±%
Conservative	Matthew Gregson *	4	Unopposed	N/A
Registered electors				
Conservative hold				

=== Pitt Street ===
No. 8 Pitt Street
Party	Candidate	Votes	%	±%
Conservative	Walter Powell Jeffreys *	225	63%	
Whig	John Smith	133	37%	
Majority		92	26%	N/A
Registered electors				
Turnout		358		
Conservative hold		Swing		

=== Rodney Street ===
No. 10 Rodney Street
Party	Candidate	Votes	%	±%
Conservative	James Aspinall Tobin *	2	Unopposed	N/A
Registered electors				
Conservative hold				

=== St. Anne Street ===
No. 13 St. Anne Street
Party	Candidate	Votes	%	±%
	John Nicholson *	3	unopposed	
Registered electors				
		Swing		

=== St. Paul's ===
No. 4 St. Paul's
Party	Candidate	Votes	%	±%
Whig	Oliver Holden *	22	Unopposed	N/A
Registered electors				
Whig hold				

=== St. Peter's ===
No. 7 St. Peter's
Party	Candidate	Votes	%	±%
Conservative	James Holme *	2	Unopposed	N/A
Registered electors				
Conservative hold				

=== Scotland ===
No. 2 Scotland
Party	Candidate	Votes	%	±%
Whig	John Woodruff *	329	69%	
Conservative	James Jack	146	31%	
Majority		183	38%	
Registered electors				
Turnout		475		
Whig hold		Swing		

=== South Toxteth ===
No. 15 South Toxteth
Party	Candidate	Votes	%	±%
Conservative	Samuel Holme *	3	Unopposed	N/A
Registered electors				
Conservative hold				

=== Vauxhall ===
No. 3 Vauxhall
Party	Candidate	Votes	%	±%
	William Nicholson	165	51%	
	Daniel Powell	157	49%	
Majority		8		
Registered electors				
Turnout		322		
	gain from	Swing		

=== West Derby ===
No. 14 West Derby
Party	Candidate	Votes	%	±%
Whig	Francis Anderson Clint	250	51%	
Conservative	William Earle	241	49%	
Majority		9	2%	N/A
Registered electors				
Turnout		491		
Whig gain from Conservative		Swing		

== Aldermanic Elections ==
On 9 November 1853, the term of office of eight aldermen who were elected on 9 November 1847 expired.

The following were elected as Aldermen by the council on 9 November 1853 for a term of office of six years.

* – re-elected Alderman.

Party	Alderman
Conservative	Joseph Cooper *
Conservative	Richard Cardwell Gardner
	Thomas Bold
Conservative	John Bramley-Moore *
Conservative	Francis Shand
Conservative	James Parker *
Conservative	Thomas Toulmin
Conservative	Samuel Holme

== By Elections ==
=== No. 11, Abercromby, November 1853 ===
Caused by Councillor Richard Cardwell Gardner (Conservative, elected 1 November 1853) being elected as an alderman on 9 November 1853.

No. 11 Abercromby
Party	Candidate	Votes	%	±%
	William Earle			
Majority				
Registered electors				
Turnout				
	gain from	Swing		

=== No. 8, Pitt Street, November 1853 ===
Caused by Councillor Thomas Toulmin (Conservative, elected 1 November 1852) being elected as an alderman on 9 November 1853.

No. 8 Pitt Street
Party	Candidate	Votes	%	±%
	William Mann			
Majority				
Registered electors				
Turnout				
		Swing		

=== No. 15, South Toxteth, November 1853 ===
Caused by Councillor Samuel Holme (Conservative, elected 1 November 1853) being elected as an alderman on 9 November 1853.

No. 15 South Toxteth
Party	Candidate	Votes	%	±%
	James Robertson			
Majority				
Registered electors				
Turnout				
	gain from	Swing		

== See also ==
- Liverpool Town Council elections 1835 – 1879
- Liverpool City Council elections 1880–present
- Mayors and Lord Mayors of Liverpool 1207 to present
- History of local government in England
