= Liverpool Town Council elections =

Liverpool Town Council existed from 1835 to 1880.

Liverpool Town Council was established by the Municipal Corporations Act 1835, replacing the Liverpool Common Council which was first established under the Charter of King John in 1207. Records for the Common Council go back to 1550. In 1835, 16 wards were established, each of which elected three councillors for a three-year term. One-third of the councillors were elected each year in a three-year cycle. The councillors were elected by male ratepayers (not all adults). The franchise was extended throughout the 19th and early 20th centuries. In addition there were 16 aldermen, who were elected by the council and had the same voting rights as the elected councillors. Liverpool Town Council became Liverpool City Council when Liverpool was awarded city status on 12 May 1880.

The municipal year ran from the date of the Council's Annual General Meeting, (9 November, unless this was a Sunday, in which case the AGM was held on Monday 10 November) until 8 (or 9) November the following year.

== Electorate ==
No	Ward	1835 Electorate	1879 Electorate
1	Everton	503	21,625
2	Scotland	344	8,300
3	Vauxhall	201	
4	St. Paul's	297	1,803
5	Exchange	468	
6	Castle Street	604	1,900
7	St. Peter's	548	1,602
8	Pitt Street	532	880
9	Great George	335	1,283
10	Rodney Street	478	2,542
11	Abercromby	373	2,540
12	Lime Street	633	
13	St. Anne Street	393	2,792
14	West Derby	370	8,845
15	South Toxteth	230	4,772
16	North Toxteth	493	
Total	Liverpool	6,802	> 58,884

The increase in the numbers of electors is due to the increasing population and the widening of the franchise.

== Council elections ==
- 1835 - First elections to the Council. Reformers win overwhelming victory
- 1836
- 1837
- 1838 - Aldermanic elections
- 1839
- 1840
- 1841 - Conservatives take control, Aldermanic elections
- 1842
- 1843
- 1844
- 1845
- 1846
- 1847
- 1848
- 1849
- 1850
- 1851
- 1852
- 1853
- 1854
- 1855
- 1856
- 1857
- 1858
- 1859 Liberal Party founded
- 1860
- 1861
- 1862
- 1863
- 1864
- 1865
- 1866
- 1867
- 1868
- 1869
- 1870
- 1871
- 1872
- 1873
- 1874
- 1875
- 1876
- 1877
- 1878
- 1879

== Polling arrangements ==
The franchise was based on rates paid, some electors had several votes depending on the number of properties for which they paid rates (residence and business premises).

Polling took place on the first of November, except when this fell on a Sunday, in which case it was moved to Monday, the second of November. This continued from 1835 to 1948, when the Representation of the People Act 1948 changed election day to the first Thursday in May.

An Alderman was appointed by the Council as the Returning officer for each of the wards and two assessors.

Polling began at 9 a.m. and ran until 4 p.m., but the Presiding Officers had the power to close the poll at any time before four o'clock, if an hour had elapsed during which no votes were cast. Even when a candidate was unopposed, the polls were opened. Usually a very small number of votes were cast and the polling was closed early.

Treating was common until it was criminalised by the Corrupt and Illegal Practices Prevention Act 1883.

There was usually one polling place in each ward. Locations used included private houses, shops, coffee houses and public houses.

== Declaration on taking office ==
Section 50 of the Municipal Corporations Act 1835 required that a Councillor, on taking office, make the following declaration "be made and subscribed before any two Aldermen or Councillors."

"I (name) do solemnly and sincerely, in the presence of God, profess, testify, and declare upon the true faith of a Christian, that I will never exercise any power, authority, or influence, which I may possess by virtue of the office of , to injure or weaken the Protestant Church, as it is by law established in England and to disturb the said Church, or the Bishops and Clergy of the said Church, in the possession of any right or privileges to which such Church, or the said Bishops and Clergy, are or may be by law enacted."

== Aldermanic elections ==
There were sixteen aldermen elected by the Town Council. In 1835 (the year of establishment of the elected Town Council) all sixteen were elected, eight for a term of three years and eight for a term of six years. Thereafter, eight were elected every third year for a term of six years.

The Aldermanic election was held at the first Council meeting after the annual election of Councillors on 9 November, except when this was a Sunday, in which case it was moved to Monday 10 November.

The election process was for "each member of the Council delivering to the Mayor a piece of paper containing the names, professions and, residences of the parties for whom he votes".

If an alderman resigned, he was fined £50, although as a result of the Bye-law of 9 November 1885 this was reduced to one shilling (5 pence in decimal currency).

== Relevant legislation ==
- Municipal Corporations Act 1835 replaced Common Councils with directly elected Borough Councils.
- Public Health Act 1848 created the local boards of health.
- Vestries Act 1850
- Municipal Corporations Act 1859
- Representation of the People Act 1867 Doubled the number of voters by enfranchising all male heads of households who paid Rates personally.
- Municipal Franchise Act 1869 enfranchised women ratepayers.
- Local Government Board Act 1871 created the Local Government Board and abolished the Poor Law Board.
- Ballot Act 1872 replaced voting in public with the Secret ballot.
- Municipal Elections Act 1875
- Elections (Hours of Poll) Act 1885

== See also ==
- Liverpool
- Liverpool City Council
- Liverpool City Council elections 1880–present
- Liverpool School Board elections 1870–1900
- Directly elected mayor of Liverpool - 2012–present
- Merseyside County Council 1974–1986
- Mayors and Lord Mayors of Liverpool 1207 to present
- West Derby Hundred
- History of local government in England
- Timeline of Liverpool
