= Scotland (Liverpool ward) =

Coordinates: 53.4150°N 2.9810°W

Scotland (ward)
- Electoral ward
- Location within Merseyside
- OS grid reference: SJ349909
  - London: 178 mi (286 km) SSE
- Metropolitan borough: City of Liverpool
- Metropolitan county: Merseyside
- Region: North West
- Country: England
- Sovereign state: United Kingdom
- Post town: LIVERPOOL
- Postcode district: L
- Dialling code: 0151
- Police: Merseyside
- Fire: Merseyside
- Ambulance: North West

Scotland was a former electoral ward in Liverpool, England. It existed in various forms during the 19th and early 20th centuries, before being reorganised and abolished with changes to local government boundaries.

== History ==
Scotland Ward was one of the original wards created under the Municipal Corporations Act 1835. It elected three councillors. It was part of Liverpool’s early division into wards; some records show it as Scotland Ward among the list of first wards from 1835 to 1895. Later on, as the city expanded, integers of wards and population shifted; after 1895, the “Scotland” name appears to split into North Scotland and South Scotland wards.

== Overview ==
Scotland Ward was located in the northern parts of Liverpool, around Scotland Road, a major thoroughfare in the city. It served a densely populated area with many terraced streets and courts. As originally formed, Scotland Ward returned three councillors to the Liverpool City Council. It was an important residential ward; Scotland Road is often mentioned in historical and social accounts of Liverpool as a large working-class area with high population density and strong local identity.

== Elections ==
=== 1835 ===
No. 2 Scotland - 3 seats
Party	Candidate	Votes	%	±%
Whig	Crawford Logan	177	60%	N/A
Whig	William Thornhill	171	58%	N/A
Whig	Richard Shiel	159	54%	N/A
Conservative	Richard Houghton *	118	40%	N/A
Conservative	James Heyworth	96	33%	N/A
Conservative	Mr. Foster	89	30%	N/A
Majority		59		N/A
Registered electors		345		
Turnout		295	86%	N/A
Whig win (new seat)				
Whig win (new seat)				
Whig win (new seat)				

The Polling place was Mr. Horner's at the corner of Eccles-street and Vauxhall-road.

=== 1836 ===
No. 2 Scotland
Party	Candidate	Votes	%	±%
Conservative	Richard Houghton	196	74%	▲34%
Whig	Richard Shiel *	68	26%	▼28%
Majority		128	48%	N/A
Registered electors		491		
Turnout		264	54%	
Conservative gain from Whig		Swing		

=== 1837 ===
No. 2 Scotland
Party	Candidate	Votes	%	±%
Whig	William Thornhill *	230	51%	
Conservative	Thomas Berry Horsfall	217	49%	
Majority		13	2%	
Registered electors				
Turnout		447		
Whig hold		Swing		

=== 1838 ===
No. 2 Scotland
Party	Candidate	Votes	%	±%
Conservative	Isaac Holmes	228	54%	
Whig	Samuel Lacon	196	46%	
Majority		32	8%	N/A
Registered electors		534		
Turnout		424	79%	
Conservative gain from Whig		Swing		

Time	Isaac Holmes		Samuel L	
Time	Votes	%	Votes	%
10:00	57	48%	63	53%
11:00	86	57%	64	43%
12:00	106	53%	93	47%
13:00	133	53%	116	47%
14:00	158	53%	141	47%
15:00	185	53%	166	47%
16:00			196	

=== 1839 ===
No. 2 Scotland
Party	Candidate	Votes	%	±%
Conservative	Richard Houghton *	232	55%	
Whig	H. T. Atkinson	191	45%	
Majority		41	10%	
Registered electors		594		
Turnout		423	71%	
Conservative hold		Swing		

=== 1840 ===
No. 2 Scotland
Party	Candidate	Votes	%	±%
Whig	William Thornhill *	215	50.1%	
Conservative	Thomas Murray Gladstone	214	49.9%	
Majority		1	0.2%	
Registered electors				
Turnout		429		
Whig hold		Swing		

Time	William Thornhill		Thomas Murray Gladstone	
Time	Votes	%	Votes	%
10:00	33	45%	40	55%
11:00	79	48%	85	52%
12:00	104	48%	112	52%
13:00	121	48%	129	52%
14:00	166	52%	155	48%
15:00	182	49.7%	184	50.3%
16:00	215	51.1%	214	49.9%

=== 1841 ===
No. 2 Scotland
Party	Candidate	Votes	%	±%
Conservative	Isaac Holmes *	313	51%	
Whig	George Quayle	303	49%	
Majority		10	2%	
Registered electors		720		
Turnout		616	86%	
Conservative hold		Swing		

=== 1842 ===
No. 2 Scotland
Party	Candidate	Votes	%	±%
Conservative	Richard Houghton junr *	Unopposed	N/A	N/A
Registered electors		536		
Conservative hold				

=== 1843 ===
No. 2 Scotland
Party	Candidate	Votes	%	±%
Whig	William Thornhill *	227	50.4%	
Conservative	Thomas Vernon	223	49.6%	
Majority		4	0.8%	
Registered electors		563		
Turnout		450	80%	
Whig hold		Swing		

Polling Place : The House, No. 61, on the south side of Burlington Street, near Limekiln-lane occupied by Mrs. Bell.

=== 1844 ===
No. 2 Scotland
Party	Candidate	Votes	%	±%
Whig	James Brancker	217	52%	
Conservative	Isaac Holmes	204	48%	
Majority		13	4%	N/A
Registered electors		535		
Turnout		421	79%	
Whig gain from Conservative		Swing		

=== 1845 ===
No. 2 Scotland
Party	Candidate	Votes	%	±%
Conservative	Richard Houghton jun *	Unopposed	N/A	N/A
Registered electors				
Conservative hold				

=== 1846 ===
No. 2 Scotland
Party	Candidate	Votes	%	±%
Conservative	James Holme	229	51%	
Whig	William Thornhill *	221	49%	
Majority		8	2%	N/A
Registered electors				
Turnout		450		
Conservative gain from Whig		Swing		

=== 1847 ===
No. 2 Scotland
Party	Candidate	Votes	%	±%
Conservative	John Woodruff	197	51%	
Whig	James Thompson	190	49%	
Majority		7	2%	
Registered electors		535		
Turnout		387	72%	
Conservative hold		Swing		

=== 1848 ===
No. 2 Scotland
Party	Candidate	Votes	%	±%
Whig	James Thomson	Unopposed	N/A	N/A
Registered electors				
Whig gain from Conservative				

Polling Place : The House No. 64, on the north side of Burlington-street, near Limekiln-lane, occupied by Mr. Joseph Jones.

James Thomson advocated the rating of the Corporate and Dock estates.

=== 1849 ===
No. 2 Scotland
Party	Candidate	Votes	%	±%
Whig	John Bingham	301	69%	
Conservative	James Holme *	135	31%	
Majority		166	38%	N/A
Registered electors		675		
Turnout		436	65%	
Whig gain from Conservative		Swing		

John Bingham was opposed to the Rivington Pike water scheme, but James Holme was in favour.

There were two cases of Personation. John Jones of Cazneau-street, who intended to vote for Mr. Bingham, discovered that he had been personated by someone who had voted for James Holme. David Starke of Waterloo-road discovered that someone else had voted for Mr. Bingham in his name.

John Holmes of Dryden-street, gave in his voting paper for Mr. Bingham, but as he walked away before his name was recorded, his vote was lost.

=== 1850 ===
No. 2 Scotland
Party	Candidate	Votes	%	±%
Whig	John Woodruff *	327	66%	
Conservative	Raymond William Houghton	172	34%	
Majority		155	32%	
Registered electors				
Turnout		499		
Whig hold		Swing		

=== 1851 ===
No. 2 Scotland
Party	Candidate	Votes	%	±%
Whig	James Thomson *	Unopposed	N/A	N/A
Registered electors				
Whig hold				

=== 1852 ===
No. 2 Scotland
Party	Candidate	Votes	%	±%
Whig	John Bingham *	297	54%	
Conservative	Samuel Taylor	249	44%	
Majority		48	10%	
Registered electors				
Turnout		546		
Whig hold		Swing		

=== 1853 ===
No. 2 Scotland
Party	Candidate	Votes	%	±%
Whig	John Woodruff *	329	69%	
Conservative	James Jack	146	31%	
Majority		183	38%	
Registered electors				
Turnout		475		
Whig hold		Swing		

=== 1854 ===
No. 2 Scotland
Party	Candidate	Votes	%	±%
Whig	Archibald Charles Stewart	350	58%	
Conservative	James Thomson *	256	42%	
Majority		350	16%	N/A
Registered electors				
Turnout		606		
Whig gain from Conservative		Swing		

=== 1855 ===
No. 2 Scotland
Party	Candidate	Votes	%	±%
Whig	John Woodruff *	Unopposed	N/A	N/A
Registered electors				
Whig hold				

=== 1856 ===
No. 2 Scotland
Party	Candidate	Votes	%	±%
Conservative	John Woodruff *	unopposed		
Registered electors				
Conservative hold		Swing		

=== 1857 ===
No. 2 Scotland
Party	Candidate	Votes	%	±%
	James Crellin	362	50.3%	
	William Liversidge	357	49.7%	
Majority		5		
Registered electors				
Turnout		719		
	gain from	Swing		

=== 1858 ===
No. 2 Scotland
Party	Candidate	Votes	%	±%
Whig	Richard Sheil *	Unopposed	N/A	N/A
Registered electors				
Whig hold				

Polling place : The House, No. 237, on the north side of Burlington Street, occupied by Mr. Des?er.

Richard Sheil was the first Catholic elected to Liverpool Town Council.

=== 1859 ===
Caused by the election of Councillor John Woodruff (Liberal, Scotland, elected 1 November 1859) as an alderman by the Council on 9 November 1859 and pronounced on 18 November 1859.

No. 2 Scotland
Party	Candidate	Votes	%	±%
Liberal	Clarke Aspinall			
Majority				
Registered electors				
Turnout				
Liberal hold		Swing		

=== 1860 ===
No. 2 Scotland
Party	Candidate	Votes	%	±%
	James Crellin *	unopposed		
Registered electors				
		Swing		

=== 1861 ===
No. 2 Scotland
Party	Candidate	Votes	%	±%
	Richard Sheil *	unopposed		
Registered electors				
		Swing		

=== 1862 ===
No. 2 Scotland
Party	Candidate	Votes	%	±%
	Clarke Aspinall	unopposed		
Registered electors				
	gain from	Swing		

=== 1863 ===
No. 2 Scotland
Party	Candidate	Votes	%	±%
Liberal	William Williams	497	55%	
Conservative	James Crellin *	405	45%	
Majority		92	10%	N/A
Registered electors				
Turnout		902		
Liberal gain from Conservative		Swing		

=== 1864 ===
No. 2 Scotland
Party	Candidate	Votes	%	±%
Liberal	Joseph Robinson	unopposed		
Registered electors				
Liberal hold		Swing		

=== 1865 ===
No. 2 Scotland
Party	Candidate	Votes	%	±%
Liberal	Clarke Aspinall *	unopposed		
Registered electors				
Liberal hold		Swing		

=== 1866 ===
No. 2 Scotland
Party	Candidate	Votes	%	±%
Liberal	William Williams *	unopposed		
Registered electors				
Liberal hold		Swing		

=== 1867 ===
No. 2 Scotland
Party	Candidate	Votes	%	±%
Liberal	Joseph Robinson *	unopposed		
Registered electors				
Liberal hold		Swing		

=== 1868 ===
No. 2 Scotland
Party	Candidate	Votes	%	±%
Liberal	James Fairhurst	442	58%	
Conservative	Walter Pierce	322	42%	
Majority		120	16%	N/A
Registered electors				
Turnout		764		
Liberal gain from Conservative		Swing		

=== 1869 ===
No. 2 Scotland
Party	Candidate	Votes	%	±%
Liberal	William Williams *	1,454	65%	
Conservative	Walter Pierce	784	35%	
Majority		670	30%	
Registered electors				
Turnout		2,238		
Liberal hold		Swing		

=== 1870 ===
No. 2 Scotland
Party	Candidate	Votes	%	±%
Liberal	John McArdle	2,881	64%	
Conservative	Robert Owen Evans	1,630	36%	
Majority		1,251	28%	
Registered electors				
Turnout		4,511		
Liberal hold		Swing		

=== 1871 ===
No. 2 Scotland
Party	Candidate	Votes	%	±%
Liberal	James Faihurst *	unopposed		
Registered electors				
Liberal hold		Swing		

=== 1872 ===
No. 2 Scotland
Party	Candidate	Votes	%	±%
Liberal	William Williams *	unopposed		
Registered electors				
Liberal hold		Swing		

=== 1873 ===
No. 2 Scotland
Party	Candidate	Votes	%	±%
Liberal	John McArdle *	unopposed		
Registered electors		9,851		
Liberal hold		Swing		

=== 1874 ===
No. 2 Scotland
Party	Candidate	Votes	%	±%
Liberal	James Faihurst *	unopposed		
Registered electors				
Liberal hold		Swing		

=== 1875 ===
No. 2 Scotland
Party	Candidate	Votes	%	±%
Home Rule	Laurence Connolly	2,815	60%	New
Liberal	William Williams *	1,887	40%	
Majority		928	20%	N/A
Registered electors		9,622		
Turnout		4,702	49%	
Home Rule gain from Liberal		Swing		

=== 1876 ===
No. 2 Scotland
Party	Candidate	Votes	%	±%
Home Rule	Dr. Alexander Murray Bligh	2,228	52%	
Liberal	John McArdle *	2,016	48%	
Majority		212	4%	N/A
Registered electors		9,876		
Turnout		4,244	43%	
Home Rule gain from Liberal		Swing		

=== 1877 ===
No. 2 Scotland
Party	Candidate	Votes	%	±%
Liberal and Irish Home Rule	Patrick de Lacy Garton	2,497	60%	
Conservative	Joseph Thomas	1,651	40%	
Majority		846	20%	N/A
Registered electors		9,453		
Turnout		4,148	44%	
Liberal Party (UK) and Home Rule League gain from Liberal				

=== 1878 ===
No. 2 Scotland
Party	Candidate	Votes	%	±%
Home Rule	Laurence Connolly *	unopposed		
Registered electors		9,671		
Home Rule hold		Swing		

=== 1879 ===
No. 2 Scotland
Party	Candidate	Votes	%	±%
Home Rule	Dr. Alexander Murray Bligh *	2,838	56%	
Conservative	Joshua Siddeley	2,191	44%	
Majority		647	12%	
Registered electors		8,300		
Turnout		5,029	61%	
Home Rule hold		Swing		

=== 1880 ===
No. 2 Scotland
Party	Candidate	Votes	%	±%
Home Rule	Patrick de Lacy Garton *	2,972	59%	
Conservative	Joshua Siddeley	2,096	41%	
Majority		876	18%	N/A
Registered electors		7,828		
Turnout		5,068	65%	
Home Rule gain from Home Rule League and Liberal Party (UK)				

=== 1881 ===
No. 2 Scotland
Party	Candidate	Votes	%	±%
Home Rule	Laurence Connolly *	unopposed		
Registered electors				
Home Rule hold		Swing		

=== 1882 ===
No. 2 Scotland
Party	Candidate	Votes	%	±%
Home Rule	Dr. Alexander Murray Bligh *	unopposed		
Registered electors				
Home Rule hold		Swing		

=== 1883 ===
No. 2 Scotland
Party	Candidate	Votes	%	±%
Liberal	Joseph Simpson	1,930	52%	
Home Rule	Patrick Byrne *	1,805	48%	
Majority		125	4%	N/A
Registered electors		7,150		
Turnout		3,735	52%	
Rejected ballots		33		
Liberal gain from Home Rule		Swing		

=== 1884 ===
No. 2 Scotland
Party	Candidate	Votes	%	±%
Home Rule	Laurence Connolly *	unopposed		
Registered electors		7,083		
Home Rule hold		Swing		

=== 1885 ===
No. 2 Scotland
Party	Candidate	Votes	%	±%
Home Rule	Dr. Alexander Murray Bligh *	unopposed		
Registered electors		7,855		
Home Rule hold		Swing		

=== 1886 ===
No. 2 Scotland
Party	Candidate	Votes	%	±%
Home Rule	William Madden	unopposed		
Registered electors				
Home Rule gain from Liberal		Swing		

=== 1887 ===
No. 2 Scotland
Party	Candidate	Votes	%	±%
Home Rule	Edward Purcell	unopposed		
Registered electors				
Home Rule hold		Swing		

=== 1888 ===
No. 2 Scotland
Party	Candidate	Votes	%	±%
Irish Nationalist	Alexander Murray Bligh *	unopposed		
Registered electors				
Irish Nationalist gain from Home Rule		Swing		

=== 1889 ===
No. 2 Scotland
Party	Candidate	Votes	%	±%
Irish Nationalist	George Jeremy Lynskey	2,890	77%	
Conservative	Harry Thomas	858	23%	
Majority		2,032	54%	N/A
Registered electors		6,832		
Turnout		3,748	56%	
Irish Nationalist gain from Home Rule		Swing		

=== 1890 ===
No. 2 Scotland
Party	Candidate	Votes	%	±%
Irish Nationalist	Edward Purcell *	2,534	70%	
Conservative	Richard Beckett	1,097	30%	
Majority		1,446	40%	
Registered electors		6,824		
Turnout		3,640	53%	
Irish Nationalist hold		Swing		

=== 1891 ===
No. 2 Scotland
Party	Candidate	Votes	%	±%
Irish Nationalist	Dr. Alexander Murray Bligh *	2,623	66%	
Conservative	Dr. John Utting	1,330	34%	
Majority		1,293	32%	
Registered electors		6.775		
Turnout		3,953	58%	
Irish Nationalist hold		Swing		

=== 1892 ===
No. 2 Scotland
Party	Candidate	Votes	%	±%
Independent Irish Nationalist	George Jeremy Lynskey *	2,511	71%	
Conservative	George James Crane	1,023	29%	
Majority		1,488	42%	N/A
Registered electors				
Turnout		3,534		
Independent Irish Nationalist gain from Irish Nationalist				

=== 1893 ===
No. 1 Scotland
Party	Candidate	Votes	%	±%
Irish Nationalist	Edward Purcell *	2,321	70%	
Conservative	George Turner	977	30%	
Majority		1,344	40%	
Registered electors				
Turnout		3,298		
Irish Nationalist hold		Swing		

=== 1894 ===
No. 1 Scotland
Party	Candidate	Votes	%	±%
Irish Nationalist	Patrick Kearney	unopposed		
Registered electors				
Irish Nationalist gain from Liberal		Swing		

=== 1895 ===
Old Scotland ward was abolished and its boundaries were rearranged, making the old Scotland ward to be redistributed into North Scotland and South Scotland wards.
