= Vauxhall (Liverpool ward) =

Metropolitan borough council ward in Liverpool, England

- Vauxhall ward within Liverpool
- Population: 4,821 (2023 electorate)
- Metropolitan borough: City of Liverpool
- Metropolitan county: Merseyside
- Region: North West
- Country: England
- Sovereign state: United Kingdom
- UK Parliament: Liverpool Riverside
- Councillors: Lisa Gaughan (Labour); Assen Christov (Labour)

Vauxhall ward is an electoral division of Liverpool City Council centred on the Vauxhall area of the city.

== Background ==
=== 1835 boundaries ===
1835 ward boundaries

The ward was created in 1835 as an original ward of Liverpool Town Council under the Municipal Corporations Act 1835 when three councillors were elected.

By 1860 the ward boundaries followed Oil Street, Chadwick Street, Chisenhale Street, Arley Street, Summer Seat, Lime Kiln Lane, Scotland Road, Byrom Street, Dale Street, Water Street and the River Mersey.

=== 1953 boundaries ===
1953 ward boundaries

The ward boundaries were changed for the 1953 elections and were merged into the Sandhills, Vauxhall ward for the 1973 elections.

=== 1980 boundaries ===
1980 ward boundaries

The ward returned as Vauxhall in 1980. A report of the Local Government Boundary Commission for England published in November 1978 set out proposals for changes to the wards of Liverpool City Council, maintaining the number of councillors at 99 representing 33 wards. Vauxhall ward was represented by three councillors.

The report describes the boundaries of Vauxhall ward as: Commencing at a point where the northwestern boundary of the City meets the western boundary of Melrose Ward, southwards along said ward boundary and eastwards and northwards along the southern boundary of said ward to Netherfield Road North, thence southwards along said road to Thomaston Street, (eastern end) thence westwards along said street and in prolongation thereof to the northern boundary of No 1 Jason Walk, thence southeastwards and southwestwards along the eastern and southern boundaries of said property to the western boundary of said property, thence southeastwards in prolongation thereof to the southern boundary of Jason Street, thence southwest-wards along said boundary to the eastern boundary of No 2 Jason Street, thence southeast wards along said boundary and generally southwest wards along the southern boundary of said property to the western boundary of said property, thence northwestwards along said boundary to NG Ref SJ 3516792661, thence southwestwards along Thomaston Street (western end) to the southern boundary of No 9 Thomaston Street thence westwards along said boundary and northwestwards along the rear property boundary of Thomaston Street to the boundary between Nos 262-260 Great Homer Street, thence westwards along said boundary to said street, thence southeastwards along said street and Fox Street to Rose Place (eastern end), to St Anne St thence southeastwards along said place to Great Richmond Street then southwestards along said street to the road known as Rose Hill thence northwestwards along said road to Rose Place (western end) and then southwestwards along said place and in continuation to Scotland Road, thence northwards along said road to a point being a prolongation southeastwards of the road known as Bevington Bush, thence northwestwards along said prolongation and said road and Limekiln lane to the road known as Summer Seat, thence southwestwards along said road, Arley Street, Chisenhale Street, Chadwick Street and Oil Street to Grid Reference SJ 3366891522 being a point in Waterloo Road, thence due westwards in a straight line to the western boundary of the City, thence northwestwards along said boundary and generally north-eastwards along the northwestern boundary of the City to the point of commencement.

=== 2004 boundary review ===
Vauxhall ward was dissolved in 2004 where it was divided into the new Kirkdale and Everton wards.

=== 2023 boundaries ===
The ward was recreated in 2023 following a review by the Local Government Boundary Commission for England which decided that the existing 30 wards each represented by three Councillors should be replaced by 64 wards represented by 85 councillors with varying representation by one, two or three councillors per ward. The Vauxhall ward was reinstated as a two-member ward from the south-east corner of the former Kirkdale ward and the north-west corner of the former Everton ward.

== Councillors ==
Election	Councillor	Councillor	Councillor
2004 - 2022 WARD DISESTABLISHED
2023	Lisa Gaughan (Lab)	Assen Christov (Lab)	

indicates seat up for re-election after boundary changes.

indicates seat up for re-election.

indicates change in affiliation.

indicates seat up for re-election after casual vacancy.

== Election results ==
=== Elections of the 2020s ===
4th May 2023
Party	Candidate	Votes	%	±%
Labour	Lisa Gaughan^{§}	749	37.26	
Labour	Assen Assenov Christov	685	34.08	
Independent	Charles Rogan	345	17.16	
Independent	Gordon Whitehall	231	11.49	
Majority		404		
Registered electors		4,959		
Turnout				
Rejected ballots		8		
Total ballots				
Labour win (new seat)				
Labour win (new seat)				

^{§}Lisa Gaughan was a re-standing councillor for the former Kirkdale ward.
