= St. Paul's (Liverpool ward) =

Ward in Liverpool

Coordinates: 53.41°N 2.9941°W

St Paul's (ward)
- Electoral ward
- Location within Merseyside
- OS grid reference: SJ3392690843
- Metropolitan borough: City of Liverpool
- Metropolitan county: Merseyside
- Region: North West
- Country: England
- Sovereign state: United Kingdom
- Post town: LIVERPOOL
- Postcode district: L
- Dialling code: 0151
- Police: Merseyside
- Fire: Merseyside
- Ambulance: North West

St. Paul’s ward is a ward in Liverpool, England. It was one of the 16 original municipal wards created in Liverpool in 1835 under the Municipal Corporations Act 1835.

== Overview ==
St. Paul’s ward was one of the 16 original municipal wards created in Liverpool in 1835 under the Municipal Corporations Act 1835. It was listed alongside others such as Everton & Kirkdale, Vauxhall, and Exchange. It elected three councillors, like the other original wards. The ward remained in place until April 1895, when ward boundaries were expanded and restructured, removing St. Paul’s from the list of active wards. The name “St. Paul” ward refers to a parish or church-dedicated area; such naming was common for wards in Liverpool in the 1800s, often taking names of prominent churches or parishes. Over time, boundary revisions and reorganisations (especially mid-20th century) led to the ward being abolished or merged with adjacent wards. Among the Liverpool electoral ward changes, many wards named after churches like St. Paul were removed or merged in general reorganisations around 1953.

== Elections ==
=== 1835 ===
No. 4 St. Paul's - 3 seats
Party	Candidate	Votes	%	±%
Whig	Christopher Rawdon	137	54%	N/A
Whig	Alexander McGregor	124	48%	N/A
Conservative	John Barton	119	46%	N/A
Whig	William Stuart	117	46%	N/A
Conservative	R. B. B. Hollinshead *	102	40%	N/A
Conservative	William Shand	89	35%	N/A
Majority		18		N/A
Registered electors		297		
Turnout		256	86%	N/A
Whig win (new seat)				
Whig win (new seat)				
Conservative win (new seat)				

Polling place : At Mather's Baths, corner of St. Paul's-square and Virginia-street

=== 1836 ===
No. 4 St. Paul's
Party	Candidate	Votes	%	±%
Conservative	John Barton *	138	54%	
Whig	James Stitt	116	46%	
Majority		22	8%	
Registered electors		340		
Turnout		254	75%	
Conservative hold		Swing	+8%	

=== 1837 ===
No. 4 St. Paul's
Party	Candidate	Votes	%	±%
Whig	Benjamin Frankland	163	51%	
Conservative	William Winstanley	155	49%	
Majority		8	2%	
Registered electors				
Turnout		318		
Whig hold		Swing		

=== 1838 ===
No. 4 St. Paul's
Party	Candidate	Votes	%	±%
Conservative	George Wright	184	53%	
Whig	Christopher Rawdon *	163	47%	
Majority		21	6%	N/A
Registered electors		481		
Turnout		347	72%	
Conservative gain from Whig		Swing		

Time	George Wright		Christopher Rawdon	
Time	Votes	%	Votes	%
10:00	56	62%	35	38%
11:00	94			
12:00	121	55%	99	45%
13:00	136	54%	116	46%
14:00	153	54%	129	46%
15:00	166	54%	142	46%
16:00	184	53%	163	47%

=== 1839 ===
No. 4 St. Paul's
Party	Candidate	Votes	%	±%
Conservative	John Barton *	178	50.1%	
Whig	John Deakin	177	49.9%	
Majority		1	0.2%	
Registered electors		433		
Turnout		355	82%	
Conservative hold		Swing		

=== 1840 ===
No. 4 St. Paul's
Party	Candidate	Votes	%	±%
Conservative	Richard Benson Blundell Hollinshead Blundell	177	51%	
Whig	John Rowland McGuffie	167	49%	
Majority		10	2%	N/A
Registered electors				
Turnout		344		
Conservative gain from Whig		Swing		

Time	Richard Benson Blundell Hollinshead Blundell		John Rowland McGuffie	
Time	Votes	%	Votes	%
10:00	72	51%	68	49%
11:00	86	50.3%	85	49.7%
12:00	99	52%	90	48%
13:00	131	52%	123	48%
14:00	146	53%	131	47%
15:00	167	52%	152	48%
16:00	177	51%	167	49%

=== 1841 ===
No. 4 St. Paul's
Party	Candidate	Votes	%	±%
Conservative	Joshua Edwards	306	54%	
Whig	Christopher Rawdon	263	46%	
Majority		43	8%	
Registered electors		771		
Turnout		569	80%	
Conservative hold		Swing		

=== 1842 ===
No. 4 St. Paul's
Party	Candidate	Votes	%	±%
Conservative	John Caton Thompson	186	53%	
Whig	John Deakin	165	47%	
Majority		21	6%	
Registered electors		477		
Turnout		351	74%	
Conservative hold		Swing		

Time	John Caton Thompson		John Deakin	
Time	Votes	%	Votes	%
10:00	30	71%	12	29%
11:00	59	60%	40	40%
12:00	91	58%	66	42%
13:00	116	59%	81	41%
14:00	143	56%	113	44%
15:00	150	53%	131	47%
16:00	186	53%	165	47%

=== 1843 ===
No. 4 St. Paul's
Party	Candidate	Votes	%	±%
Conservative	Richard Benson Blundell Hollinshead Blundell *	179	52%	
Whig	John Deakin	162	48%	
Majority		17	4%	
Registered electors		423		
Turnout		341	81%	
Conservative hold		Swing		

Polling Place : Mr. Mather's Baths, at the north west corner of St. Paul's-square.

=== 1844 ===
No. 4 St. Paul's
Party	Candidate	Votes	%	±%
Conservative	Robert Brodhurst Hill	152	56%	
Whig	James Stitt	119	44%	
Majority		33	12%	
Registered electors		388		
Turnout		271	70%	
Conservative hold		Swing		

=== 1845 ===
No. 4 St. Paul's
Party	Candidate	Votes	%	±%
Whig	Eyre Evans	171	56%	
Conservative	John Caton Thompson *	133	44%	
Majority		38	12%	N/A
Registered electors				
Turnout		304		
Whig gain from Conservative		Swing		

=== 1846 ===
No. 4 St. Paul's
Party	Candidate	Votes	%	±%
Whig	James Stitt	145	57%	
Conservative	John Briscoe	108	43%	
Majority		37	14%	
Registered electors		472		
Turnout		253	54%	
Whig hold		Swing		

=== 1847 ===
No. 4 St. Paul's
Party	Candidate	Votes	%	±%
Conservative	Robert Brodhurst Hill *	173	57%	
Whig	Thomas Booth	129	43%	
Majority		44	14%	
Registered electors		461		
Turnout		302	66%	
Conservative hold		Swing		

=== 1848 ===
No. 4 St. Paul's
Party	Candidate	Votes	%	±%
Conservative	John Briscoe	185	50.4%	
Whig	John Rowland McGuffie	182	49.6%	
Majority		3	0.8%	N/A
Registered electors				
Turnout		367		
Conservative gain from Whig		Swing		

Polling Place : The House of Mr. Mather, at the northwest corner of St. Paul's-square. Both candidates were pro-raters.

=== 1849 ===
No. 4 St. Paul's
Party	Candidate	Votes	%	±%
Conservative	Thomas Godfrey	137	52%	
Conservative	Dr. John Games	125	48%	
Majority		12	4%	
Registered electors		411		
Turnout		262	64%	
Conservative hold		Swing		

Thomas Godfrey was opposed to the Rivington Pike water scheme and in favour of imposing rates on the dock and council estates, as was Dr. John Games.

=== 1850 ===
No. 4 St. Paul's
Party	Candidate	Votes	%	±%
Whig	Oliver Holden	192	65%	
Conservative	John James	104	35%	
Majority		88	30%	N/A
Registered electors				
Turnout		296		
Whig gain from Conservative		Swing		

=== 1851 ===
No. 4 St. Paul's
Party	Candidate	Votes	%	±%
Whig	John Rowland McGuffie	Unopposed	N/A	N/A
Registered electors				
Whig gain from Conservative				

=== 1852 ===
No. 4 St. Paul's
Party	Candidate	Votes	%	±%
Conservative	Thomas Godfrey *	207	52%	
Whig	Thomas Savage	193	48%	
Majority		14	4%	
Registered electors				
Turnout		560		
Conservative hold		Swing		

=== 1853 ===
No. 4 St. Paul's
Party	Candidate	Votes	%	±%
Whig	Oliver Holden *	22	Unopposed	N/A
Registered electors				
Whig hold				

=== 1854 ===
No. 4 St. Paul's
Party	Candidate	Votes	%	±%
Whig	John Rowland McGuffie *	204	58%	
Whig	Thomas Savage	147	42%	
Majority		57	16%	
Registered electors				
Turnout		351		
Whig hold		Swing		

=== 1855 ===
No. 4 St. Paul's
Party	Candidate	Votes	%	±%
Conservative	Thomas Godfrey	222	55%	
Whig	J. B. Spence	179	45%	
Majority		43	10%	
Registered electors		522		
Turnout		401	77%	
Conservative hold		Swing		

=== 1856 ===
No. 4 St. Paul's
Party	Candidate	Votes	%	±%
Whig	Oliver Holden *	unopposed		
Registered electors				
Whig hold		Swing		

=== 1857 ===
No. 4 St. Paul's
Party	Candidate	Votes	%	±%
Conservative	William Barton	201	51%	
Whig	John Rowland McGuffie *	195	49%	
Majority		6	2%	N/A
Registered electors				
Turnout		396		
Conservative gain from Whig		Swing		

=== 1858 ===
No. 4 St. Paul's
Party	Candidate	Votes	%	±%
Whig	John Clerk	186	61%	
Conservative	Thomas Rigby	119	39%	
Majority		67	22%	N/A
Registered electors				
Turnout		305		
Whig gain from Conservative		Swing		

Time	John Clerk		Thomas Rigby	
Time	Votes	%	Votes	%
10:00	40	63%	23	37%
11:00	80	63%	46	37%
12:00	119	68%	57	32%
13:00	140	66%	71	34%
14:00	160	66%	84	34%
15:00	174	65%	92	35%
16:00	185	63%	110	37%

Polling Place : The House of Mr. John Mather, at the north-west corner of St. Paul's Square.

=== 1859 ===
No. 4 St. Paul's
Party	Candidate	Votes	%	±%
Liberal	Oliver Holden *	unopposed		
Registered electors				
Liberal hold		Swing		

=== 1860 ===
No. 4 St. Paul's
Party	Candidate	Votes	%	±%
Conservative	William Barton *	unopposed		
Registered electors				
Conservative hold		Swing		

=== 1861 ===
No. 4 St. Paul's
Party	Candidate	Votes	%	±%
Liberal	John Buck Spence	192	54%	
Conservative	Thomas Rigby	162	46%	
Majority		30	8%	
Registered electors				
Turnout		354		
Liberal hold		Swing		

Time	John Buck Spence		Thomas Rigby	
Time	Votes	%	Votes	%
10:00	55	49%	57	51%
11:00	109	60%	73	40%
12:00	137	59%	94	41%
13:00	155	59%	106	41%
14:00	170	59%	118	41%
15:00	180	58%	132	42%
16:00	187	57%	141	43%

=== 1862 ===
No. 4 St. Paul's
Party	Candidate	Votes	%	±%
Liberal	Oliver Holden *	unopposed		
Registered electors				
Liberal hold		Swing		

=== 1863 ===
No. 4 St. Paul's
Party	Candidate	Votes	%	±%
Conservative	William Barton *	unopposed		
Registered electors				
Conservative hold		Swing		

=== 1864 ===
No. 4 St. Paul's
Party	Candidate	Votes	%	±%
Liberal	Maurice Williams	252	75%	
Conservative	Lewis Hornblower	85	25%	
Majority		167	50%	
Registered electors				
Turnout		337		
Liberal hold		Swing		

Time	Maurice Williams		Lewis Hornblower	
Time	Votes	%	Votes	%
11:00	156	74%	55	26%
11:30	166	75%	55	25%
12:00	191	75%	64	25%
12:30	208	75%	70	25%
13:00	222	74%	76	26%
13:30	227	74%	78	26%
14:00	231	75%	79	25%
15:00	244	74%	84	26%
15:30	245	74%	85	26%
16:00	252	75%	85	25%

=== 1865 ===
No. 4 St. Paul's
Party	Candidate	Votes	%	±%
Conservative	Oliver Holden	unopposed		
Registered electors				
Conservative hold		Swing		

=== 1866 ===
No. 4 St. Paul's
Party	Candidate	Votes	%	±%
Conservative	William Barton *	unopposed		
Registered electors				
Conservative hold		Swing		

No. 4 St. Paul's
Party	Candidate	Votes	%	±%
Conservative	Oliver Holden	233	53%	
Liberal	Peter George Heyworth	205	47%	
Majority		28	6%	N/A
Registered electors				
Turnout		438		
Conservative gain from Liberal		Swing		

=== 1867 ===
No. 4 St. Paul's
Party	Candidate	Votes	%	±%
Liberal	Maurice Williams *	unopposed		
Registered electors				
Liberal hold		Swing		

=== 1868 ===
No. 4 St. Paul's
Party	Candidate	Votes	%	±%
Conservative	Oliver Holden	233	53%	
Liberal	Peter George Heyworth	205	47%	
Majority		28	6%	N/A
Registered electors				
Turnout		438		
Conservative gain from Liberal		Swing		

=== 1869 ===
No. 4 St. Paul's
Party	Candidate	Votes	%	±%
Conservative	William Barton *	unopposed		
Registered electors				
Conservative hold		Swing		

=== 1870 ===
No. 4 St. Paul's
Party	Candidate	Votes	%	±%
Conservative	Thomas Huntington	544	52%	
Liberal	John Taylor Davies	497	48%	
Majority		47	4%	N/A
Registered electors				
Turnout		1,041		
Conservative gain from Liberal		Swing		

=== 1871 ===
No. 4 St. Paul's
Party	Candidate	Votes	%	±%
Conservative	Robert Wheeler Preston	643	53%	
Liberal	George Mayall jun.	569	47%	
Majority		74	6%	
Registered electors		1,613		
Turnout		1,212	75%	
Conservative hold		Swing		

=== 1872 ===
No. 4 St. Paul's
Party	Candidate	Votes	%	±%
Conservative	Owen Hugh Williams	674	58%	
Liberal	George Mayall jnr.	498	42%	
Majority		176	16%	
Registered electors		1,641		
Turnout		1,172	71%	
Conservative hold		Swing		

=== 1873 ===
No. 4 St. Paul's
Party	Candidate	Votes	%	±%
Conservative	Thomas Huntington *	unopposed		
Registered electors		2,029		
Conservative hold		Swing		

=== 1874 ===
No. 4 St. Paul's
Party	Candidate	Votes	%	±%
Conservative	Robert Wheeler Preston *	unopposed		
Registered electors				
Conservative hold		Swing		

=== 1875 ===
No. 4 St. Paul's
Party	Candidate	Votes	%	±%
Conservative	Owen Hugh Williams *	Unopposed	N/A	N/A
Registered electors				
Conservative hold				

=== 1876 ===
No. 4 St. Paul's
Party	Candidate	Votes	%	±%
Conservative	Thomas Huntington *	unopposed		
Registered electors				
Conservative hold		Swing		

=== 1877 ===
No. 4 St. Paul's
Party	Candidate	Votes	%	±%
Liberal	William Williams	648	52%	
Conservative	Robert Wheeler Preston *	597	48%	
Majority		51	4%	N/A
Registered electors		1,749		
Turnout		1,245	71%	
Liberal gain from Conservative		Swing		

=== 1878 ===
No. 4 St. Paul's
Party	Candidate	Votes	%	±%
Conservative	Owen Hugh Williams *	739	53%	
Liberal	David Hughes	647	47%	
Majority		92	6%	
Registered electors		1,770		
Turnout		1,386	78%	
Conservative hold		Swing		

=== 1879 ===
No. 4 St. Paul's
Party	Candidate	Votes	%	±%
Liberal	John Davies	697	54%	
Conservative	Thomas Huntington *	602	46%	
Majority		95	8%	N/A
Registered electors		1,803		
Turnout		1,299	72%	
Liberal gain from Conservative		Swing		

=== 1880 ===
No. 4 St. Paul's
Party	Candidate	Votes	%	±%
Conservative	George Curzon Dobell	708	50%	
Liberal	William Williams	703	50%	
Majority		5	0%	
Registered electors		1,767		
Turnout		1,411	80%	
Conservative hold		Swing		

=== 1881 ===
No. 4 St. Paul's
Party	Candidate	Votes	%	±%
Conservative	Owen Hugh Williams *	unopposed		
Registered electors				
Conservative hold		Swing		

=== 1882 ===
No. 4 St. Paul's
Party	Candidate	Votes	%	±%
Liberal	John Davies *	unopposed		
Registered electors				
Liberal hold		Swing		

=== 1883 ===
No. 4 St. Paul's
Party	Candidate	Votes	%	±%
Liberal	John Thomas Warrington	560	77%	
Home Rule	Patrick Murphy	169	23%	
Majority		391	54%	N/A
Registered electors		1,542		
Turnout		729		
Rejected ballots		3		
Liberal gain from Conservative		Swing		

=== 1884 ===
No. 4 St. Paul's
Party	Candidate	Votes	%	±%
Conservative	George Curzon Dobell	561	51%	
Liberal	Samuel Hough	540	49%	
Majority		21	2%	
Registered electors		1,530		
Turnout		1,101	72%	
Conservative hold		Swing		

=== 1885 ===
No. 4 St. Paul's
Party	Candidate	Votes	%	±%
Liberal	John Davies *	unopposed		
Registered electors		1,512		
Liberal hold		Swing		

=== 1886 ===
No. 4 St. Paul's
Party	Candidate	Votes	%	±%
Conservative	Sylvester Mattison	unopposed		
Registered electors				
Conservative gain from Liberal		Swing		

=== 1887 ===
No. 4 St. Paul's
Party	Candidate	Votes	%	±%
Conservative	George Curzon Dobell *	unopposed		
Registered electors				
Conservative hold		Swing		

=== 1888 ===
No. 4 St. Paul's
Party	Candidate	Votes	%	±%
Liberal	John Davies *	unopposed		
Registered electors				
Liberal hold		Swing		

=== 1889 ===
No. 4 St. Paul's
Party	Candidate	Votes	%	±%
Liberal	Philip Henry Rathbone	520	54%	
Conservative	Sylvester Mattison *	450	46%	
Majority		70	8%	N/A
Registered electors		1,353		
Turnout		970	72%	
Liberal gain from Conservative		Swing		

=== 1890 ===
No. 4 St. Paul's
Party	Candidate	Votes	%	±%
Liberal	Nathaniel Topp	525	56%	
Conservative	Frank John Leslie	405	44%	
Majority		120	12%	N/A
Registered electors		1,342		
Turnout		930	69%	
Liberal gain from Conservative		Swing		

=== 1891 ===
No. 4 St. Paul's
Party	Candidate	Votes	%	±%
Liberal	Richard Robert Meade-King	502	51%	
Conservative	Charles Stewart Dean	475	49%	
Majority		27	2%	N/A
Registered electors				
Turnout		977		
Liberal gain from Conservative		Swing		

=== 1892 ===
Caused by the election of Councillor Philip Henry Rathbone JP (Liberal, St, Paul's, elected 1 November 1892) as an alderman by the Council on 9 November 1892 .

No. 4 St. Paul's
Party	Candidate	Votes	%	±%
Conservative	Charles Stewart Dean	517	50.6%	
Liberal	Jacob Gaitskell Brown	504	49.4%	
Majority		13	1.2%	N/A
Registered electors				
Turnout		1,021		
Conservative gain from Liberal		Swing		

=== 1893 ===
No. 4 St. Paul's
Party	Candidate	Votes	%	±%
Liberal	Nathaniel Topp *	484	52%	
Conservative	Robert Atwood Beaver	442	47%	
Labour	Edward Kaney	8	0.86%	
Majority		42		
Registered electors		1,232		
Turnout		934	76%	
Liberal hold		Swing		

=== 1894 ===
No. 4 St. Paul's
Party	Candidate	Votes	%	±%
Liberal	Richard Robert Meade-King *	unopposed		
Registered electors				
Liberal hold		Swing		
