= South Toxteth (Liverpool ward) =

Ward in Liverpool, England

Coordinates: 53.3810°N 2.9490°W

- Former electoral ward
- Location within Merseyside
- OS grid reference: SJ355879
  - London: 178 mi (286 km) South-east
- Metropolitan borough: City of Liverpool
- Metropolitan county: Merseyside
- Region: North West
- Country: England
- Sovereign state: United Kingdom
- Post town: LIVERPOOL
- Postcode district: L8
- Dialling code: 0151
- Police: Merseyside
- Fire: Merseyside
- Ambulance: North West
- UK Parliament: Liverpool Riverside

South Toxteth ward was an electoral ward of Liverpool City Council covering the southern part of the historic township of Toxteth Park (later Toxteth), in the city of Liverpool, England. It is now defunct, as the remainder of the township was incorporated in 1895, when a complete reorganization of the wards took place.

== History ==
The area of Toxteth Park was originally a large deer hunting royal park which by the early 17th century had begun to be dis-parked and farmed. As Liverpool expanded during the 19th century the township became increasingly urbanised. Within the municipal borough of Liverpool, the ward structure in the 19th century included wards designated as “North Toxteth” and “South Toxteth”. The former divisions within the borough of Liverpool, up until 1895, were known as North Toxteth and South Toxteth. When the remainder of the township was incorporated in 1895, a complete reorganization of the wards was carried out.

== Geography ==
South Toxteth comprised the southern portion of the township of Toxteth Park, lying south of areas later defined as “North Toxteth”. Historical maps of 1890 show the south sheet of Liverpool including Toxteth, Dingle and the area around Princes Park. South Toxteth covered the southern portion of the Toxteth Park area, which is now generally associated with parts of modern Toxteth, Princes Park and surrounding streets. Historical plans and 19th-century maps show dense Victorian terraces laid out across the area by the late 1800s, which the same urban expansion that prompted changes to Liverpool’s ward structure. Because the ward was an historical municipal unit, its exact boundaries moved as the borough boundary and internal warding arrangements were changed.

== Governance ==
The ward elected local councillors / aldermen to Liverpool’s municipal government under the borough arrangements in force at the time. Late-Victorian municipal reform and the inclusion of additional township areas within Liverpool led to an 1890s reorganisation of wards: the former North and South Toxteth arrangement was abandoned in favour of a larger number of more finely divided wards and the borough moved from a small number of large wards to several smaller wards with standardised representation. Following subsequent 20th- and 21st-century boundary reviews the names and borders of Liverpool wards changed many times. The neighbourhood that was once covered by South Toxteth now lies within modern wards such as Toxteth/Princes Park and adjacent divisions established by later reviews.

== Elections ==
=== 1835 ===
No. 15 South Toxteth - 3 seats
Party	Candidate	Votes	%	±%
Whig	John Cropper	114	59%	N/A
Whig	W. Sharples	99	51%	N/A
Whig	Francis Jordan	92	47%	N/A
Conservative	Mr. Fletcher	80	41%	N/A
Conservative	Mr. Smith	75	39%	N/A
Conservative	N. Robinson	65	34%	
Majority		34		N/A
Registered electors		230		
Turnout		194	84%	N/A
Whig win (new seat)				
Whig win (new seat)				
Whig win (new seat)				

Polling place : At the southernmost of the Shops recently built by Dr. Hughes, on the west side of Park-road.

=== 1836 ===
No. 15 South Toxteth - 2 seats
Party	Candidate	Votes	%	±%
Whig	John Platt	112	53%	
Whig	Francis Jordan *	109	53%	
Conservative	Alexander Smith	100	47%	
Conservative	Thomas M. Gladstone	98	47%	
Majority		12	6%	
Registered electors		279		
Turnout		212	76%	
Whig hold		Swing		
Whig hold		Swing		

=== 1837 ===
No. 15 South Toxteth
Party	Candidate	Votes	%	±%
Whig	John Platt	134	51%	
Conservative	Alexander Smith jnr	129	49%	
Majority		5	2%	
Registered electors				
Turnout		263		
Whig hold		Swing		

=== 1838 ===
No. 15 South Toxteth
Party	Candidate	Votes	%	±%
Whig	John Cropper *	145	57%	
Conservative	Thomas Murray Gladstone	108	43%	
Majority		37	14%	
Registered electors		355		
Turnout		253	71%	
Whig hold		Swing		

Time	John Cropper		Thomas Murray Gladstone	
Time	Votes	%	Votes	%
10:00	64	70%	28	30%
11:00	71	61%	45	39%
12:00	86	65%	47	35%
13:00	101	60%	68	40%
14:00	121	61%	79	40%
15:00	129	60%	85	40%
16:00	145	57%	108	43%

=== 1839 ===
No. 15 South Toxteth
Party	Candidate	Votes	%	±%
Whig	Francis Jordan	148	51%	
Conservative	William McKee	142	49%	
Majority		6	2%	
Registered electors		363		
Turnout		290	80%	
Whig hold		Swing		

=== 1840 ===
No. 15 South Toxteth
Party	Candidate	Votes	%	±%
Whig	John Platt *	144	51%	
Conservative	J. Shepperd	138	49%	
Majority		6	2%	
Registered electors				
Turnout		282		
Whig hold		Swing		

Time	John Platt		John Shepperd	
Time	Votes	%	Votes	%
10:00	30	45%	36	55%
11:00	76	58%	56	42%
12:00				
13:00	107	54%	91	46%
14:00	122	54%	106	46%
15:00	129	51%	122	49%
16:00	144	51%	138	49%

=== 1841 ===
No. 15 South Toxteth
Party	Candidate	Votes	%	±%
Conservative	Simon Lee Trotman	241	55%	
Whig	William H. Taylour	197	45%	
Majority		44	10%	N/A
Registered electors		531		
Turnout		438	82%	
Conservative gain from Whig		Swing		

=== 1842 ===
No. 15 South Toxteth
Party	Candidate	Votes	%	±%
Conservative	Ambrose Lace	142	69%	
Whig	Francis Jordan *	64	31%	
Majority		78	38%	N/A
Registered electors		385		
Turnout		206	54%	
Conservative gain from Whig		Swing		

Time	Ambrose Lace		Francis Jordan	
Time	Votes	%	Votes	%
10:00				
11:00	53	72%	21	28%
12:00	63	73%	23	27%
13:00	80	74%	28	26%
14:00	103	74%	36	26%
15:00	106	71%	43	29%
16:00	142	69%	64	31%

=== 1843 ===
No. 15 South Toxteth
Party	Candidate	Votes	%	±%
Conservative	T. T. Glazebrook	118	50.2%	
Whig	John Platt *	117	49.8%	
Majority		1	0.4%	N/A
Registered electors		687		
Turnout		235	34%	
Conservative gain from Whig		Swing		

Polling Place : The Shop on the west side of Park-road, occupied by William McCartney, near the Church of John the Baptist.

=== 1844 ===
No. 15 South Toxteth
Party	Candidate	Votes	%	±%
Conservative	Roger Lyon Jones	175	56%	
Whig	Richard Vaughan Yates	136	44%	
Majority		39	12%	
Registered electors		464		
Turnout		311	67%	
Conservative hold		Swing		

=== 1845 ===
No. 15 South Toxteth
Party	Candidate	Votes	%	±%
Conservative	Ambrose Lace *	Unopposed	N/A	N/A
Registered electors				
Conservative hold				

=== 1846 ===
No. 15 South Toxteth
Party	Candidate	Votes	%	±%
Whig	William Watson	171	51%	
Conservative	Thomas Swanbrook Glazebrook *	162	49%	
Majority		9	2%	N/A
Registered electors				
Turnout		333		
Whig gain from Conservative		Swing		

=== 1847 ===
No. 15 South Toxteth
Party	Candidate	Votes	%	±%
Conservative	Roger Lyon Jones *	219	54%	
Whig	Thomas Avison	184	46%	
Majority		35	8%	
Registered electors		625		
Turnout		403	64%	
Conservative hold		Swing		

=== 1848 ===
No. 15 South Toxteth
Party	Candidate	Votes	%	±%
Whig	Edward Cannon Hindley	Unopposed	N/A	N/A
Registered electors				
Whig gain from Conservative				

Polling Place : The Shop, on the west side of Park-road, occupied by Mrs. Eliza Gould, near the church of St. John the Baptist.

Edward Cannon Hindley was a pro-rater.

=== 1849 ===
No. 15 South Toxteth
Party	Candidate	Votes	%	±%
	William Joseph Horsfall	229	62%	
	Richard Harbord	139	38%	
Majority		90		
Registered electors		558		
Turnout		368	66%	
	gain from	Swing		

William Joseph Horsfall was in favour of the Rivington Pike water scheme, whereas Richard Harbord was opposed.

=== 1850 ===
No. 15 South Toxteth
Party	Candidate	Votes	%	±%
Conservative	Samuel Holme	Unopposed	N/A	N/A
Registered electors				
Conservative hold				

=== 1851 ===
No. 15 South Toxteth
Party	Candidate	Votes	%	±%
Conservative	John Stewart	272	80%	
Whig	Edward Cannon Hindley *	66	20%	
Majority		206	60%	N/A
Registered electors				
Turnout		338		
Conservative gain from Whig		Swing		

=== 1852 ===
No. 15 South Toxteth
Party	Candidate	Votes	%	±%
Conservative	William Joseph Horsfall *	Unopposed	N/A	N/A
Registered electors				
Conservative hold				

=== 1853 ===
No. 15 South Toxteth
Party	Candidate	Votes	%	±%
Conservative	Samuel Holme *	3	Unopposed	N/A
Registered electors				
Conservative hold				

=== 1854 ===
No. 15 South Toxteth
Party	Candidate	Votes	%	±%
Conservative	John Stewart *	unopposed		
Registered electors				
Conservative hold		Swing		

=== 1855 ===
No. 15 South Toxteth
Party	Candidate	Votes	%	±%
Conservative	John Farnworth	267	76%	
Whig	W. F. McGregor	83	24%	
Majority		184	52%	
Registered electors		651		
Turnout		350	54%	
Conservative hold		Swing		

=== 1856 ===
No. 15 South Toxteth
Party	Candidate	Votes	%	±%
	James Robertson	unopposed		
Registered electors				
	gain from	Swing		

=== 1857 ===
No. 15 South Toxteth
Party	Candidate	Votes	%	±%
Conservative	John Stewart *	164	92%	
Whig	Mr. Alpass	14	8%	
Majority		150	84%	
Registered electors				
Turnout		178		
Conservative hold		Swing		

=== 1858 ===
No. 15 South Toxteth
Party	Candidate	Votes	%	±%
Conservative	John Farnworth *	unopposed		
Registered electors				
Conservative hold		Swing		

Polling Place : The shop on the west side of Park Road, occupied by Eliza Gould, near the church of St. John the Baptist.

=== 1859 ===
==== No. 15, South Toxteth, 18 November 1859 ====
Caused by the election of Councillor John Stewart (Conservative, South Toxteth, elected 1 November 1857) as an alderman by the Council on 9 November 1859.

No. 15 South Toxteth
Party	Candidate	Votes	%	±%
Conservative	Joseph Steel	unopposed		
Registered electors		1,207		
Conservative hold		Swing		

=== 1860 ===
No. 15 South Toxteth
Party	Candidate	Votes	%	±%
	Joseph Steel	unopposed		
Registered electors				
	gain from	Swing		

=== 1861 ===
No. 15 South Toxteth
Party	Candidate	Votes	%	±%
Liberal	Horace Seymour Alpass	298	54%	
Conservative	John Farnworth	249	46%	
Majority		49	8%	
Registered electors				
Turnout		547		
Liberal hold		Swing		

Time	Horace Seymour Alpass		John Farnworth	
Time	Votes	%	Votes	%
10:00	100	59%	69	41%
11:00	111	58%	79	42%
12:00	164	61%	105	39%
13:00	205	56%	160	44%
14:00	233	56%	185	44%
15:00	259	51%	247	49%
16:00	298	54%	249	46%

=== 1862 ===
No. 15 South Toxteth
Party	Candidate	Votes	%	±%
Conservative	Henry Threlfall Wilson	417	57%	
Liberal	Maurice Williams	311	43%	
Majority		106	14%	
Registered electors				
Turnout		728		
Conservative hold		Swing		

=== 1863 ===
No. 15 South Toxteth
Party	Candidate	Votes	%	±%
Liberal	William Cowley Miller	488	60%	
Conservative	Joseph Steel *	324	40%	
Majority		164	20%	N/A
Registered electors				
Turnout		812		
Liberal gain from Conservative		Swing		

=== 1864 ===
No. 15 South Toxteth
Party	Candidate	Votes	%	±%
Conservative	John Brandreth Hughes	490	55%	
Liberal	Horace Seymour Alpass *	407	45%	
Majority		83	10%	N/A
Registered electors				
Turnout		897		
Conservative gain from Liberal		Swing		

=== 1865 ===
No. 15 South Toxteth
Party	Candidate	Votes	%	±%
Conservative	Henry Threlfall Wilson *	unopposed		
Registered electors				
Conservative hold		Swing		

=== 1866 ===
No. 15 South Toxteth
Party	Candidate	Votes	%	±%
Liberal	William Cowley Miller	unopposed		
Registered electors				
Liberal gain from Conservative		Swing		

=== 1867 ===
No. 15 South Toxteth
Party	Candidate	Votes	%	±%
Conservative	Andrew Barclay Walker	533	56%	
Liberal	Horace Seymour Alpass	280	34%	
Majority		253	22%	
Registered electors				
Turnout		813		
Conservative hold		Swing		

=== 1868 ===
The death of Councillor William Cowley Miller (Liberal, elected for the South Toxteth ward on 1 November 1866) was reported to the Council on 2 June 1869.

No. 15 South Toxteth
Party	Candidate	Votes	%	±%
	Richard Allison Watson			
Majority				
Registered electors				
Turnout				
	gain from	Swing		

=== 1869 ===
No. 15 South Toxteth
Party	Candidate	Votes	%	±%
Conservative	Richard Allison Watson	929	59%	
Liberal	Dr. Ewing Whittle	639	41%	
Majority		290	18%	N/A
Registered electors				
Turnout		1,568		
Conservative gain from Liberal		Swing		

=== 1870 ===
No. 15 South Toxteth
Party	Candidate	Votes	%	±%
Conservative	Andrew Barclay Walker *	unopposed		
Registered electors				
Conservative hold		Swing		

=== 1871 ===
No. 15 South Toxteth
Party	Candidate	Votes	%	±%
Liberal	John Parratt *	unopposed		
Registered electors				
Liberal hold		Swing		

=== 1872 ===
No. 15 South Toxteth
Party	Candidate	Votes	%	±%
	Richard Allison Watson *	1,018	71%	
Liberal	Henry Jevons	361	25%	
Conservative	John Hughes	53	4%	
Majority		657		
Registered electors		4,169		
Turnout		1,432	34%	
gain from Conservative		Swing		

=== 1873 ===
No. 15 South Toxteth
Party	Candidate	Votes	%	±%
Conservative	Isaac Jackson	unopposed		
Registered electors		5,084		
Conservative hold		Swing		

=== 1874 ===
No. 15 South Toxteth
Party	Candidate	Votes	%	±%
Conservative	Thomas Bland Royden	unopposed		
Registered electors				
Conservative hold		Swing		

=== 1875 ===
No. 15 South Toxteth
Party	Candidate	Votes	%	±%
Conservative	Richard Allison Watson *	Unopposed	N/A	N/A
Registered electors				
Conservative hold				

=== 1876 ===
No. 15 South Toxteth
Party	Candidate	Votes	%	±%
Conservative	William Radcliffe	unopposed		
Registered electors				
Conservative hold		Swing		

=== 1877 ===
No. 15 South Toxteth
Party	Candidate	Votes	%	±%
Conservative	Thomas Bland Royden *	unopposed		
Registered electors				
Conservative hold		Swing		

=== 1878 ===
No. 15 South Toxteth
Party	Candidate	Votes	%	±%
Conservative	Joseph Ball	1,870	51%	
Liberal	John Evans	1,783	49%	
Majority		87	2%	
Registered electors		5,862		
Turnout		3,653	62%	
Conservative hold		Swing		

=== 1879 ===
No. 15 South Toxteth
Party	Candidate	Votes	%	±%
Conservative	William Radcliffe *	1,729	55%	
Liberal	Edward Paull	1,402	45%	
Majority		327	10%	
Registered electors		4,772		
Turnout		3,131	66%	
Conservative hold		Swing		

=== 1880 ===
No. 15 South Toxteth
Party	Candidate	Votes	%	±%
Conservative	Thomas Bland Royden *	1,937	57%	
Liberal	John Evans	1,486	43%	
Majority		451	14%	
Registered electors		5,004		
Turnout		3,423	68%	
Conservative hold		Swing		

=== 1881 ===
No. 15 South Toxteth
Party	Candidate	Votes	%	±%
Conservative	Joseph Ball *	unopposed		
Registered electors				
Conservative hold		Swing		

=== 1882 ===
No. 15 South Toxteth
Party	Candidate	Votes	%	±%
Conservative	William Radcliffe *	unopposed		
Registered electors				
Conservative hold		Swing		

=== 1883 ===
No. 15 South Toxteth
Party	Candidate	Votes	%	±%
Conservative	Thomas Bland Royden *	Unopposed	N/A	N/A
Registered electors		5,482		
Conservative hold				

=== 1884 ===
No. 15 South Toxteth
Party	Candidate	Votes	%	±%
Conservative	Joseph Ball *	unopposed		
Registered electors		5,473		
Conservative hold		Swing		

=== 1885 ===
No. 15 South Toxteth
Party	Candidate	Votes	%	±%
Conservative	William Radcliffe *	unopposed		
Registered electors		5,586		
Conservative hold		Swing		

=== 1886 ===
No. 15 South Toxteth
Party	Candidate	Votes	%	±%
Conservative	Thomas Bland Royden M.P. *	Unopposed	N/A	N/A
Registered electors				
Conservative hold				

=== 1887 ===
No. 15 South Toxteth
Party	Candidate	Votes	%	±%
Conservative	Joseph Ball *	unopposed		
Registered electors				
Conservative hold		Swing		

=== 1888 ===
No. 15 South Toxteth
Party	Candidate	Votes	%	±%
Conservative	William Radcliffe *	1,837	56%	
Liberal	John Thomas	1,440	44%	
Majority		397	12%	
Registered electors		5,323		
Turnout		3,277	62%	
Conservative hold		Swing		

=== 1889 ===
No. 15 South Toxteth
Party	Candidate	Votes	%	±%
Conservative	Thomas Evans	1,717	52%	
Liberal	John Thomas	1,593	48%	
Majority		124	4%	
Registered electors		5,468		
Turnout		3,310	61%	
Conservative hold		Swing		

=== 1890 ===
No. 15 South Toxteth
Party	Candidate	Votes	%	±%
Conservative	Joseph Ball *	1,939	51%	
Liberal	Joseph Paul Brunner	1,845	49%	
Majority		94	2%	
Registered electors		5,968		
Turnout		3,784	63%	
Conservative hold		Swing		

=== 1891 ===
No. 15 South Toxteth
Party	Candidate	Votes	%	±%
Conservative	James De Bels Adam	2,256	54%	
Liberal	Joseph Paul Brunner	1,927	46%	
Majority		329	8%	
Registered electors		5,600		
Turnout		4,183	75%	
Conservative hold		Swing		

=== 1892 ===
No. 15 South Toxteth
Party	Candidate	Votes	%	±%
Conservative	William Roberts	1,923	52%	
Liberal	Joseph Wilson	1,624	44%	
Labour	Edward Kaney	154	4%	
Majority		299	8%	
Registered electors				
Turnout		3,701		
Conservative hold		Swing		

=== 1893 ===
No. 15 South Toxteth
Party	Candidate	Votes	%	±%
Conservative	Joseph Ball *	2,157	56%	
Liberal	John Thomas Warrington	1,693	44%	
Majority		464	12%	
Registered electors		3,850		
Turnout				
Conservative hold		Swing		

=== 1894 ===
No. 15 South Toxteth
Party	Candidate	Votes	%	±%
Conservative	Thomas Evans	unopposed		
Registered electors				
Conservative hold		Swing		
