= Everton (ward) =

Council ward in Liverpool, England

Coordinates: 53.4257°N 2.9664°W

- Everton ward (2004) within Liverpool
- Area: 3.544 km^{2} (1.368 sq mi)
- Population: 17,454 (2021 census)
  - Density: 4,925/km^{2} (12,760/sq mi)
- Registered Electors: 11,141 (2021 election)
- Metropolitan borough: City of Liverpool
- Metropolitan county: Merseyside
- Region: North West
- Country: England
- Sovereign state: United Kingdom
- UK Parliament: Liverpool Walton

Everton ward was an electoral division of Liverpool City Council in the Liverpool Walton Parliamentary constituency.

== Background ==
The ward was created in 1835 as an original ward of Liverpool Town Council under the Municipal Corporations Act 1835. The ward boundaries were changed in 1953 and in 1973 was merged into the Central, Everton, Netherfield ward before being re-established in 1980. The boundaries were again changed in 2004 and the ward was split into three parts in 2023.

=== 1980 boundaries ===
1980 ward boundaries

A report of the Local Government Boundary Commission for England published in November 1978 set out proposals for changes to the wards of Liverpool City Council, maintaining the number of councillors at 99 representing 33 wards. Croxteth ward was represented by three councillors.

The report describes the boundaries as "Commencing at a point where the western boundary of the City meets the southern boundary of Vauxhall Ward, thence generally eastwards along said ward boundary and northwards and eastwards along the eastern boundary of said ward to the western boundary of Breckfield Ward, thence generally southeastwards along said boundary and eastwards along the southern boundary of said ward to the western boundary of Kensington Ward, thence southeastwards and southwestwards along said boundary and continuing southwestwards along West -Derby Road and Brunswick Road to Moss Street, thence southwards along said street and Daulby Street to Pembroke Place, thence northwestwards along said place and London Road to Seymour Street, thence southeastwards along said street to Copperas Hill, thence southwestwards along said Hill and Ranelagh Street to Church Street, thence generally westwards along said street and Lord Street to Derby Square, thence generally southwestwards along the eastern and southeastern side of said square to Redcross Street, thence continuing southwestwards along said street to Strand Street, thence due southwestwards to the western boundary of the City, thence northwestwards along said boundary to the point of commencement.

In 2004 the ward was distributed into the new Everton ward, Central ward, and Kirkdale ward.

=== 2004 boundaries ===
A review by the Boundary Committee for England recommended that the council was formed of a reduced number of 90 members elected from 30 wards. Everton ward was formed from the former Breckfield and Everton wards, with small parts of the former Kensington and Vauxhall wards.

The ward boundaries followed Everton Valley, Walton Breck Road, Oakfield Road, Belmont Road, West Derby Road, Brunswick Road, New Islington, Hunter Street, Byrom Street, Scotland Road, and Kirkdale Road.

The population of the ward at the 2021 Census was 17,454.

=== 2023 election ===
The ward was dissolved in 2023 where it was distributed into the new Everton East, Everton North, Everton West, and Vauxhall wards.

== Councillors ==
Election	Councillor	Councillor	Councillor
2004	John McIntosh (Lab)	Jane Corbett (Lab)	Frank Prendergast (Lab)
2006	John McIntosh (Lab)	Jane Corbett (Lab)	Frank Prendergast (Lab)
2007	John McIntosh (Lab)	Jane Corbett (Lab)	Frank Prendergast (Lab)
2008	John McIntosh (Lab)	Jane Corbett (Lab)	Frank Prendergast (Lab)
2010	John McIntosh (Lab)	Jane Corbett (Lab)	Frank Prendergast (Lab)
2011	John McIntosh (Lab)	Jane Corbett (Lab)	Frank Prendergast (Lab)
2012	John McIntosh (Lab)	Jane Corbett (Lab)	Frank Prendergast (Lab)
2014	John McIntosh (Lab)	Jane Corbett (Lab)	Frank Prendergast (Lab)
2015	John McIntosh (Lab)	Jane Corbett (Lab)	Frank Prendergast (Lab)
2016	John McIntosh (Lab)	Jane Corbett (Lab)	Frank Prendergast (Lab)
2018	Ian Byrne (Lab)	Jane Corbett (Lab)	Frank Prendergast (Lab)
2019	Ian Byrne (Lab)	Jane Corbett (Lab)	Frank Prendergast (Lab)
2021	Ian Byrne (Lab)	Jane Corbett (Lab)	Alfie Hincks (Lab)
2022	Ellie Byrne (Lab)	Jane Corbett (Lab)	Alfie Hincks (Lab)

indicates seat up for re-election after boundary changes.

indicates seat up for re-election.

indicates change in affiliation.

indicates seat up for re-election after casual vacancy.

- Cllr Frank Prendergast (elected Labour, 2016), left the Labour Party and sat as an Independent member of the council in 2018 until he unsuccessfully stood for re-election in 2021.
- Cllr Ian Byrne (Labour, 2018) stood down as a councillor in 2022, three years after being elected as the Member of Parliament for Liverpool West Derby.

== Election results ==
=== Elections of the 2020s ===
Everton By-Election, 7 April 2022
Party	Candidate	Votes	%	±%
**Labour**	**Ellie Mary Byrne**	**925**	**61.96**	**▼3.37**
Green	Kevin Robinson-Hale	362	24.25	▲14.08
Liberal	Angela Therese Preston	84	5.63	▲1.84
Conservative	Wendy Rose Hine	51	3.42	▼2.81
TUSC	Roger Bannister	46	3.08	n/a
Liberal Democrats	Stephen Fitzsimmons	25	1.67	▼2.08
Majority		563	37.71	▼16.89
Turnout		1,493	13.62	▼10.30
Rejected ballots		12	0.80	▼1.83
Total ballots		1,505	13.73	
Registered electors		10,961		
Labour **hold**		Swing	-8.73	

Liverpool City Council Municipal Elections 2021: 6 May 2021
Party	Candidate	Votes	%	±%
**Labour**	**Alfie Hincks**	**1,741**	**65.33**	**▼23.81**
Independent	Frank Prendergast	286	10.73	n/a
Green	Kevin Robinson-Hale	271	10.17	▲1.37
Conservative	David William Murray	166	6.23	▲3.25
Liberal	Linda Marion Roberts	101	3.79	▲0.99
Liberal Democrats	Lisa Ann Nicholson-Smith	100	3.75	▼0.45
Majority		1,455	54.60	▼25.74
Turnout		2,665	23.92	▲1.91
Rejected ballots		72	2.63	▲1.16
Total ballots		2,737	24.57	
Registered electors		11,141		
Labour **hold**		Swing	-11.91	

=== Elections of the 2010s ===
Liverpool City Council Municipal Elections 2019: 2nd May 2019
Party	Candidate	Votes	%	±%
**Labour**	**Jane Corbett**	**2,036**	**89.14**	**▲2.54**
Green	Samuel James Cassidy	201	8.80	▲5.03
Liberal Democrats	Susan Kennaugh-Dyson	96	4.20	▲1.97
Conservative	David William Murray	68	2.98	▼2.15
Liberal	Linda Marion Roberts	64	2.80	▲0.54
Majority		1,835	80.34	▼1.13
Turnout		2,318	22.01	▼2.77
Registered electors		10,532		
Rejected ballots		34	1.47	▲0.98
Labour **hold**		Swing	-1.24	

Liverpool City Council Municipal Elections 2018: 3rd May 2018
Party	Candidate	Votes	%	±%
**Labour**	**Ian Robert Byrne**	**2,295**	**86.60**	**▲5.21**
Conservative	David William Murray	136	5.13	▲1.44
Green	Noel Jane Little	100	3.77	▼4.22
Liberal	Linda Marion Roberts	60	2.26	▼4.78
Liberal Democrats	Nicholas Richard Sawyer	59	2.23	N/A
Majority		2,159	81.47	▲8.18
Turnout		2,663	24.78	▼0.95
Registered electors		10,746		
Rejected ballots		13	0.49	
Labour **hold**		Swing	+1.94	

Liverpool City Council Municipal Elections 2016: 5th May 2016
Party	Candidate	Votes	%	±%
**Labour**	**Frank Prendergast**	**2,136**	**81.28**	**▼0.63**
Green	Ashley Pascal Scott-Griffiths	210	7.99	▲5.02
Liberal	Linda Marion Roberts	185	7.04	▲5.12
Conservative	Kirsten Ann Watson	97	3.69	▲0.39
Majority		1,926	73.29	▼0.24
Registered electors		10,319		
Turnout		2,655	25.73	▼32.89
Labour **hold**		Swing	-2.83	

Liverpool City Council Municipal Elections 2015: 7th May 2015
Party	Candidate	Votes	%	±%
Labour	**Jane Corbett**	4,984	81.91%	+12.43%
UKIP	Neil Lawrence Miney	510	8.38%	−10.44%
Conservative	Angela Maria Oates	201	3.30%	+1.07%
Green	Fiona Coyne	181	2.97%	−1.25%
Liberal	Linda Marion Roberts	117	1.92%	−0.31%
TUSC	Roger Edwards	92	1.51%	−1.50%
Majority		4,474	73.53%	−22.87%
Registered electors		10,435		
Turnout		6,117	58.62%	+29.44%
Labour **hold**		Swing	11.44%	

Liverpool City Council Municipal Elections 2014: 22nd May 2014
Party	Candidate	Votes	%	±%
Labour	**John McIntosh**	2,056	69.48%	−17.33%
UKIP	John Halvorsen	557	18.82%	n/a
Green	Esther Ruth Cosslett	125	4.22%	−1.98%
TUSC	Roger Edwards	89	3.01%	n/a
Liberal	Linda Marion Roberts	66	2.23%	−0.77%
Conservative	Jack Stallworthy	66	2.23%	−0.05%
Majority		1,499	50.66%	−29.95%
Turnout		2959	29.18%	−0.92%
Labour **hold**		Swing		

Liverpool City Council Municipal Elections 2012: 3rd May 2012
Party	Candidate	Votes	%	±%
Labour	**Frank Prendergast**	2,548	86.81%	+4.00%
Green	Raphael Levy	182	6.20%	+2.97%
Liberal	Linda Marion Roberts	88	3.00%	−2.78%
Conservative	Frank Andrew Carpenter	67	2.28%	−1.83%
British Freedom	Jacqueline Stafford	50	1.70%	−2.41%
Majority		2,366	80.61%	−0.75%
Turnout		2,935	30.10%	−1.8%
Labour **hold**		Swing	+0.52%	

Liverpool City Council Municipal Elections 2011: 5th May 2011
Party	Candidate	Votes	%	±%
Labour	**Jane Corbett**	**2563**	**82.81%**	+10.84%
Conservative	Harry Fraser	127	4.11%	−1.49%
BNP	Dennis Patrick Leary	126	4.07%	−1.59%
Green	Raphael Levy	100	3.23%	+0.56%
Liberal	Linda Marlon Roberts	179	5.78%	−8.33%
Majority		2436	81.36%	+17.60%
Turnout		3095	31.9%	−18.06%
Labour **hold**		Swing	9.59%	

Liverpool City Council Municipal Elections 2010: Everton
Party	Candidate	Votes	%	±%
Labour	**John McIntosh**	**3623**	**74.73%**	
Liberal	Linda Marion Roberts	532	10.97%	
BNP	Jackie Stafford	281	5.80%	
Conservative	James Andrew Rogers	278	5.73%	
Green	Raphael Levy	134	2.76%	
Majority		3091	63.76%	
Turnout		4848	48.93%	
Labour **hold**		Swing		

=== Elections of the 2000s ===
Liverpool City Council Municipal Elections 2008: Everton
Party	Candidate	Votes	%	±%
Labour	**Frank Pendergast**	**1678**	**72.02%**	
BNP	Jackie Stafford	222	9.53%	
Conservative	Mark Andrew Cottrell	130	5.58%	
Liberal Democrats	Peter Joseph Rainford	120	5.15%	
Green	Peter North	102	4.38%	
Liberal	Linda Marion Roberts	78	3.35%	
Majority				
Turnout		2330	23.07%	
Labour **hold**		Swing		

Liverpool City Council Municipal Elections 2007: Everton
Party	Candidate	Votes	%	±%
Labour	**Jane Corbett**	**1675**	**73.66%**	
Liberal Democrats	Craig Crennell	233	10.25%	
BNP	Jackie Stafford	154	6.77%	
Liberal	Linda Marion Roberts	108	4.75%	
Conservative	Matthew Joseph Sephton	104	4.57%	
Majority				
Turnout		2274	22.21%	
Labour **hold**		Swing		

Liverpool City Council Municipal Elections 2006: Everton
Party	Candidate	Votes	%	±%
Labour	**John McIntosh**	**1519**	**73.31%**	
Liberal Democrats	Craig Crennell	296	14.29%	
Conservative	Matthew Joseph Sephton	140	6.76%	
Liberal	David Stanley Wood	117	5.65%	
Majority				
Turnout		2072	18.59%	
Labour **hold**		Swing		

After the boundary change of 2004 the whole of Liverpool City Council faced election. Three Councillors were returned.

Liverpool City Council Municipal Elections 2004: Everton
Party	Candidate	Votes	%	±%
Labour	**Francis Pendergast**	**1834**		
Labour	**Jane Corbett**	**1827**		
Labour	**John McIntosh**	**1678**		
Liberal Democrats	Kathryn Kavanagh	453		
Liberal Democrats	Derek McKenna	424		
Liberal Democrats	Sally-Anne Thompson	389		
Conservative	Donna Lockley	321		
Liverpool Labour	Dougie Kidd	320		
Green	Helen Bryant	270		
Liberal	Justin Prescott	268		
Independent	Harry Jones	212		
Liberal	Daniel Wood	192		
Majority				
Turnout		3225	28.05%	
Labour **hold**		Swing	n/a	

• italics - Denotes the sitting Councillor.
• bold - Denotes the winning candidate.
