= 1872 Liverpool Town Council election =

English local election

- November 1, 1872

16 seats were up for election: one seat for each of the 16 wards 33 (incl. Aldermen) seats needed for a majority

Elections to Liverpool Town Council were held on Monday 1 November 1872. One third of the council seats were up for election, the term of office of each councillor being three years.

The Ballot Act 1872 received Royal Assent on 18 July 1872, introducing the Secret Ballot.

Six of the sixteen wards were uncontested.

After the election, the composition of the council was:

| Party | Councillors | ± | Aldermen | Total |
|---|---|---|---|---|
| Conservative | ?? | ?? | ?? | ?? |
| Liberal | ?? | ?? | ?? | ?? |

== Election result ==
Liverpool local election result 1872
| Party | Seats | Gains | Losses | Net gain/loss | Seats % | Votes % | Votes | +/− |
|---|---|---|---|---|---|---|---|---|
| Conservative | 9 | 1 | 3 | -2 | 56% | 48% | 6,668 | |
| Liberal | 6 | 2 | 1 | -1 | 38% | 44% | | |

Because of the large number of uncontested seats, these statistics should be taken in that context.

== Ward results ==
* - Retiring Councillor seeking re-election

=== Abercromby ===
No. 11 Abercromby
| Party | Candidate | Votes | % | ±% |
|---|---|---|---|---|
| Conservative | Anthony Bower | 788 | 55% | |
| Liberal | Arthur Earle | 653 | 45% | |
| Majority | | 135 | 10% | N/A |
| Registered electors | | 2,236 | | |
| Turnout | | 1,441 | 64% | |
| Conservative gain from Liberal | | Swing | | |

=== Castle Street ===
No. 6 Castle Street
| Party | Candidate | Votes | % | ±% |
|---|---|---|---|---|
| Liberal | Samuel Greg Rathbone * | unopposed | | |
| Registered electors | | | | |
| Liberal hold | | Swing | | |

=== Everton ===
No. 1 Everton
| Party | Candidate | Votes | % | ±% |
|---|---|---|---|---|
| Conservative | John Pearson * | unopposed | | |
| Registered electors | | | | |
| Conservative hold | | Swing | | |

=== Exchange ===
No. 5 Exchange
| Party | Candidate | Votes | % | ±% |
|---|---|---|---|---|
| Liberal | Thomas Holder | 887 | 58% | |
| Conservative | Hugh Hathorn Nicholson | 644 | 42% | |
| Majority | | 243 | 16% | N/A |
| Registered electors | | 2,257 | | |
| Turnout | | 1,531 | | |
| Liberal gain from Conservative | | Swing | | |

=== Great George ===
No. 9 Great George
| Party | Candidate | Votes | % | ±% |
|---|---|---|---|---|
| Conservative | John Hughes * | unopposed | | |
| Registered electors | | | | |
| Conservative hold | | Swing | | |

=== Lime Street ===
No. 12 Lime Street
| Party | Candidate | Votes | % | ±% |
|---|---|---|---|---|
| Conservative | Richard Rowlands Minton * | 612 | 63% | |
| Liberal | John Horsfall | 361 | 37% | |
| Majority | | 251 | 26% | |
| Registered electors | | 1,560 | | |
| Turnout | | 973 | 62% | |
| Conservative hold | | Swing | | |

=== North Toxteth ===
No. 16 North Toxteth
| Party | Candidate | Votes | % | ±% |
|---|---|---|---|---|
| Conservative | Richard Fell Steble * | 544 | 93% | |
| Liberal | William Lyon Warke | 40 | 7% | |
| Majority | | 504 | 86% | |
| Registered electors | | | | |
| Turnout | | 584 | | |
| Conservative hold | | Swing | | |

=== Pitt Street ===
No. 8 Pitt Street
| Party | Candidate | Votes | % | ±% |
|---|---|---|---|---|
| Conservative | Henry Jennings * | unopposed | | |
| Registered electors | | | | |
| Conservative hold | | Swing | | |

=== Rodney Street ===
No. 10 Rodney Street
| Party | Candidate | Votes | % | ±% |
|---|---|---|---|---|
| Conservative | James Houghton * | 727 | 56% | |
| Liberal | Samuel James Capper | 577 | 44% | |
| Majority | | 150 | 12% | |
| Registered electors | | 2,330 | | |
| Turnout | | 1,304 | 56% | |
| Conservative hold | | Swing | | |

=== St. Anne Street ===
No. 13 St. Anne Street
| Party | Candidate | Votes | % | ±% |
|---|---|---|---|---|
| Conservative | James Tarbuck * | 708 | 61% | |
| Liberal | William Dawbarn | 446 | 39% | |
| Majority | | 262 | 22% | |
| Registered electors | | 2,307 | | |
| Turnout | | 1,154 | 50% | |
| Conservative hold | | Swing | | |

=== St. Paul's ===
No. 4 St. Paul's
| Party | Candidate | Votes | % | ±% |
|---|---|---|---|---|
| Conservative | Owen Hugh Williams | 674 | 58% | |
| Liberal | George Mayall jnr. | 498 | 42% | |
| Majority | | 176 | 16% | |
| Registered electors | | 1,641 | | |
| Turnout | | 1,172 | 71% | |
| Conservative hold | | Swing | | |

=== St. Peter's ===
No. 7 St. Peter's
| Party | Candidate | Votes | % | ±% |
|---|---|---|---|---|
| Liberal | Charles Tricks Bowring * | 466 | 70% | |
| Conservative | William George Bradley | 196 | 30% | |
| Majority | | 270 | 40% | |
| Registered electors | | 1,595 | | |
| Turnout | | 662 | 42% | |
| Liberal hold | | Swing | | |

=== Scotland ===
No. 2 Scotland
| Party | Candidate | Votes | % | ±% |
|---|---|---|---|---|
| Liberal | William Williams * | unopposed | | |
| Registered electors | | | | |
| Liberal hold | | Swing | | |

=== South Toxteth ===
No. 15 South Toxteth
| Party | Candidate | Votes | % | ±% |
|---|---|---|---|---|
| | Richard Allison Watson * | 1,018 | 71% | |
| Liberal | Henry Jevons | 361 | 25% | |
| Conservative | John Hughes | 53 | 4% | |
| Majority | | 657 | | |
| Registered electors | | 4,169 | | |
| Turnout | | 1,432 | 34% | |
| gain from Conservative | | Swing | | |

=== Vauxhall ===
No. 3 Vauxhall
| Party | Candidate | Votes | % | ±% |
|---|---|---|---|---|
| Liberal | James Whitty * | unopposed | | |
| Registered electors | | | | |
| Liberal hold | | Swing | | |

=== West Derby ===
No. 14 West Derby
| Party | Candidate | Votes | % | ±% |
|---|---|---|---|---|
| Liberal | William Durning Holt | 1,818 | 51% | |
| Conservative | John Birch Melladew * | 1,722 | 49% | |
| Majority | | 96 | 2% | N/A |
| Registered electors | | 5,885 | | |
| Turnout | | 3,540 | 60% | |
| Liberal gain from Conservative | | Swing | | |

== By-elections ==
=== Aldermanic By Election 6 January 1873 ===
The death of alderman Oliver Holden was reported to the Council on 1 January 1873. Former Councillor John Birch Melladew (Conservative, West Derby, last elected 1 November 1869) was elected as an alderman by the Council (Councillors and aldermen) on 6 January 1873.

=== Aldermanic By Election, 9 April 1873 ===
Alderman William Bennett resigned on 12 February 1873.

Thomas Carey was elected as an alderman by the Council (Councillors and Aldermen) on 9 April 1873.

=== No. 15, South Toxteth, 28 March 1873 ===
The death of Councillor John Parrat (Conservative, South Toxteth, elected 1 November 1871) was reported to the Council on 24 March 1873.

No. 15 South Toxteth
| Party | Candidate | Votes | % | ±% |
|---|---|---|---|---|
| Conservative | Thomas Bland Royden | unopposed | | |
| Registered electors | | 4,169 | | |
| Conservative hold | | Swing | | |

=== No. 12, Lime Street, 22 July 1873 ===
The death of Councillor Henry Hornby (Conservative, Lime Street, elected 1 November 1871) was reported to the Council on 6 August 1873

No. 12 Lime Street
| Party | Candidate | Votes | % | ±% |
|---|---|---|---|---|
| Conservative | James Alexander Forrest | unopposed | | |
| Registered electors | | 1,560 | | |
| Conservative hold | | Swing | | |

== See also ==
- Liverpool City Council
- Liverpool Town Council elections 1835 - 1879
- Liverpool City Council elections 1880–present
- Mayors and Lord Mayors of Liverpool 1207 to present
- History of local government in England
