= 1869 Liverpool Town Council election =

1869 English local government election

- November 1, 1869

16 seats were up for election: one seat for each of the 16 wards 33 (incl. Aldermen) seats needed for a majority

Elections to Liverpool Town Council were held on Monday 1 November 1869. One third of the council seats were up for election, the term of office of each councillor being three years.

Six of the sixteen wards were uncontested.

After the election, the composition of the council was:

Party	Councillors	±	Aldermen	Total
Conservative	??	+4	16	??
Liberal	??	-4	0	??

== Election result ==
Liverpool local election result 1869
Party	Seats	Gains	Losses	Net gain/loss	Seats %	Votes %	Votes	+/−
Conservative	11	4	0	+4	69%	52%	9,719	
Liberal	5	0	4	-4	31%	48%	9,216	

Because of the large number of uncontested seats, these statistics should be taken in that context.

== Ward results ==
* - Retiring Councillor seeking re-election

=== Abercromby ===
No. 11 Abercromby
Party	Candidate	Votes	%	±%
Liberal	Charles Pierre Melly *	759	52%	
Conservative	Robert Vining	691	48%	
Majority		68	4%	
Registered electors				
Turnout		1,450		
Liberal hold		Swing		

=== Castle Street ===
No. 6 Castle Street
Party	Candidate	Votes	%	±%
Liberal	Samuel Greg Rathbone *	unopposed		
Registered electors				
Liberal hold		Swing		

=== Everton ===
No. 1 Everton
Party	Candidate	Votes	%	±%
Conservative	John Pearson *	2,685	54%	
Liberal	Robert Owen Evans	2,317	46%	
Majority		368	8%	
Registered electors		10,107		
Turnout		5,002	49%	
Conservative hold		Swing		

=== Exchange ===
No. 5 Exchange
Party	Candidate	Votes	%	±%
Conservative	Fletcher Rogers	unopposed		
Registered electors				
Conservative gain from Liberal		Swing		

=== Great George ===
No. 9 Great George
Party	Candidate	Votes	%	±%
Conservative	John Hughes	384	53%	
Liberal	Francis Gerard Prange	344	47%	
Majority		40	6%	N/A
Registered electors				
Turnout		728		
Conservative gain from Liberal		Swing		

=== Lime Street ===
No. 12 Lime Street
Party	Candidate	Votes	%	±%
Conservative	Richard Rowland Minton *	unopposed		
Registered electors				
Conservative hold		Swing		

=== North Toxteth ===
No. 16 North Toxteth
Party	Candidate	Votes	%	±%
Conservative	Lieut Col. Richard Fell Steble	1,237	60%	
Liberal	Henry Jevons	815	40%	
Majority		422	20%	
Registered electors				
Turnout		2,052		
Conservative hold		Swing		

=== Pitt Street ===
No. 8 Pitt Street
Party	Candidate	Votes	%	±%
Conservative	Henry Jennings *	unopposed		
Registered electors				
Conservative hold		Swing		

=== Rodney Street ===
No. 10 Rodney Street
Party	Candidate	Votes	%	±%
Conservative	James Houghton	683	55%	
Liberal	Thomas Gair *	551	45%	
Majority		132	10%	N/A
Registered electors		2,030		
Turnout		1,234	61%	
Conservative gain from Liberal		Swing		

=== St. Anne Street ===
No. 13 St. Anne Street
Party	Candidate	Votes	%	±%
Conservative	James Tarbuck	560	55%	
Liberal	John Knight Archer	459	45%	
Majority		101	10%	
Registered electors				
Turnout		1,019		
Conservative hold		Swing		

=== St. Paul's ===
No. 4 St. Paul's
Party	Candidate	Votes	%	±%
Conservative	William Barton *	unopposed		
Registered electors				
Conservative hold		Swing		

=== St. Peter's ===
No. 7 St. Peter's
Party	Candidate	Votes	%	±%
Liberal	Charles Tricks Bowring *	449	69%	
Conservative	Reginald Young	202	31%	
Majority		247	38%	
Registered electors				
Turnout		651		
Liberal hold		Swing		

=== Scotland ===
No. 2 Scotland
Party	Candidate	Votes	%	±%
Liberal	William Williams *	1,454	65%	
Conservative	Walter Pierce	784	35%	
Majority		670	30%	
Registered electors				
Turnout		2,238		
Liberal hold		Swing		

=== South Toxteth ===
No. 15 South Toxteth
Party	Candidate	Votes	%	±%
Conservative	Richard Allison Watson	929	59%	
Liberal	Dr. Ewing Whittle	639	41%	
Majority		290	18%	N/A
Registered electors				
Turnout		1,568		
Conservative gain from Liberal		Swing		

=== Vauxhall ===
No. 3 Vauxhall
Party	Candidate	Votes	%	±%
Liberal	James Whitty *	unopposed		
Registered electors				
Liberal hold		Swing		

=== West Derby ===
No. 14 West Derby
Party	Candidate	Votes	%	±%
Conservative	John Birch Melladew *	1,636	53%	
Liberal	Richard Johnson	1,429	47%	
Majority		207	6%	
Registered electors				
Turnout		3,065		
Conservative hold		Swing		

== By-elections ==
=== Aldermanic By Election, 9 November 1869 ===
Following the retirement of Alderman Thomas Bold, Bernard Hall was elected as an alderman by the council on 9 November 1869.

=== No. 7, St. Peter's, 14 January 1870 ===
Caused by the resignation of Councillor Jacob Gaitskell Brown (Liberal, St. Peter's, elected 1 November 1867) on 30 December 1869.

No. 7 St. Peter's
Party	Candidate	Votes	%	±%
Liberal	Francis Gerard Prange	451	53%	
Conservative	Thomas Blissett	394	47%	
Majority		57	6%	
Registered electors				
Turnout		845		
Liberal hold		Swing		

=== No. 2, Scotland, 3 February 1870 ===
Caused by the resignation of Councillor Joseph Robinson (Liberal, Scotland, elected unopposed on 1 November 1867)

No. 2 Scotland
Party	Candidate	Votes	%	±%
Liberal	John McArdle	unopposed		
Registered electors				
Liberal hold		Swing		

== See also ==
- Liverpool City Council
- Liverpool Town Council elections 1835 - 1879
- Liverpool City Council elections 1880–present
- Mayors and Lord Mayors of Liverpool 1207 to present
- History of local government in England
