= 1870 Liverpool Town Council election =

English local election

- November 1, 1870

16 seats were up for election: one seat for each of the 16 wards 33 (incl. Aldermen) seats needed for a majority

Elections to Liverpool Town Council were held on Monday 1 November 1870. One third of the council seats were up for election, the term of office of each councillor being three years. Nine of the sixteen wards were uncontested.

After the election, the composition of the council was:

Party	Councillors	±	Aldermen	Total
Conservative	??	??	16	??
Liberal	??	??	0	??

== Election result ==
Liverpool local election result 1870
Party	Seats	Gains	Losses	Net gain/loss	Seats %	Votes %	Votes	+/−
Conservative	9	2	2	0	56%	42%	3,663	
Liberal	7	2	2	0	44%	58%	5,016	

Because of the large number of uncontested seats, these statistics should be taken in that context.

== Ward results ==
* - Retiring Councillor seeking re-election

=== Abercromby ===
No. 11 Abercromby
Party	Candidate	Votes	%	±%
Liberal	Robertson Gladstone *	unopposed		
Registered electors				
Liberal hold		Swing		

=== Castle Street ===
No. 6 Castle Street
Party	Candidate	Votes	%	±%
Conservative	Thomas Woodburn	unopposed		
Registered electors				
Conservative gain from Liberal		Swing		

=== Everton ===
No. 1 Everton
Party	Candidate	Votes	%	±%
Conservative	Thomas Woodburn	2		
Liberal	Peter Williams	0		
Majority				
Registered electors				
Turnout				
Conservative hold		Swing		

=== Exchange ===
No. 5 Exchange
Party	Candidate	Votes	%	±%
Liberal	Stephen Barker Guion	unopposed		
Registered electors				
Liberal gain from Conservative		Swing		

=== Great George ===
No. 9 Great George
Party	Candidate	Votes	%	±%
	John Tudsbery Turner	unopposed		
Registered electors				
		Swing		

=== Lime Street ===
No. 12 Lime Street
Party	Candidate	Votes	%	±%
Liberal	James Allanson Picton *	unopposed		
Registered electors				
Liberal hold		Swing		

=== North Toxteth ===
No. 16 North Toxteth
Party	Candidate	Votes	%	±%
Conservative	Joseph Harrison *	unopposed		
Registered electors				
Conservative hold		Swing		

=== Pitt Street ===
No. 8 Pitt Street
Party	Candidate	Votes	%	±%
Conservative	Charles Edward Hamilton	363	55%	
Liberal	Daniel Lowrey	298	45%	
Majority		65	10%	
Registered electors				
Turnout		661		
Conservative hold		Swing		

=== Rodney Street ===
No. 10 Rodney Street
Party	Candidate	Votes	%	±%
Liberal	Philip Henry Rathbone *	869	66%	
Conservative	Thomas Dawson	447	34%	
Majority		442	32%	
Registered electors				
Turnout		1,316		
Liberal hold		Swing		

=== St. Anne Street ===
No. 13 St. Anne Street
Party	Candidate	Votes	%	±%
Conservative	John Stopford Taylor *	677	59%	
Liberal	Edwin Hughes	469	41%	
Majority		208	18%	
Registered electors				
Turnout		1,146		
Conservative hold		Swing		

=== St. Paul's ===
No. 4 St. Paul's
Party	Candidate	Votes	%	±%
Conservative	Thomas Huntington	544	52%	
Liberal	John Taylor Davies	497	48%	
Majority		47	4%	N/A
Registered electors				
Turnout		1,041		
Conservative gain from Liberal		Swing		

=== St. Peter's ===
No. 7 St. Peter's
Party	Candidate	Votes	%	±%
Liberal	Francis George Prange	2		
Conservative	Francis George Harbord	0		
Majority		2		
Registered electors				
Turnout		2		
Liberal hold		Swing		

=== Scotland ===
No. 2 Scotland
Party	Candidate	Votes	%	±%
Liberal	John McArdle	2,881	64%	
Conservative	Robert Owen Evans	1,630	36%	
Majority		1,251	28%	
Registered electors				
Turnout		4,511		
Liberal hold		Swing		

=== South Toxteth ===
No. 15 South Toxteth
Party	Candidate	Votes	%	±%
Conservative	Andrew Barclay Walker *	unopposed		
Registered electors				
Conservative hold		Swing		

=== Vauxhall ===
No. 3 Vauxhall
Party	Candidate	Votes	%	±%
Conservative	Peter Silvester Bidwell	unopposed		
Registered electors				
Conservative gain from Liberal		Swing		

=== West Derby ===
No. 14 West Derby
Party	Candidate	Votes	%	±%
Conservative	Edward Samuelson *	unopposed		
Registered electors				
Conservative hold		Swing		

== By-elections ==
=== No.4, St. Paul's, 17 March 1871 ===
The death of Alderman Richard Sheil was reported to the Council on 1 March 1870. Councillor Oliver Holden (Conservative, St. Paul's, elected 1 November 1868) was elected as an alderman by the Council (Councillors and Aldermen) on 8 March 1871.

No. 4 St. Paul's
Party	Candidate	Votes	%	±%
Liberal	George Mayall jun.	558	52%	
Conservative	Peter Thomson	513	48%	
Majority		45	4%	N/A
Registered electors				
Turnout		1,071		
Liberal gain from Conservative		Swing		

=== Aldermanic By Election, 15 April 1871 ===
The death of Alderman John Stewart JP was reported to the Council meeting on 19 April 1871. Peter Thomson was elected as an Alderman by the Council (Councillors and Aldermen) on 15 April 1871.

=== Aldermanic By Election, 6 October 1871 ===
The death of Alderman Thomas Dover JP was reported to the Council meeting on 4 October 1871. Former Councillor James Jack (Conservative, Rodney Street last elected 1 November 1864) was elected as an alderman by the Council (Councillors and Aldermen) on 6 October 1871.

== See also ==
- Liverpool City Council
- Liverpool Town Council elections 1835 - 1879
- Liverpool City Council elections 1880–present
- Mayors and Lord Mayors of Liverpool 1207 to present
- History of local government in England
