= 1891 Liverpool City Council election =

Liverpool City Council elections 1891

← 1890	November 1, 1891	1892 →

16 seats were up for election (one third): one seat for each of the 16 wards 33 (incl. Aldermen) seats needed for a majority

Elections to Liverpool City Council were held on Monday 2 November 1891. One third of the council seats were up for election, the term of office of each councillor being three years.

After the election, the composition of the council was:

Party	Councillors	±	Aldermen	Total
Conservative	??	-2	16	??
Liberal	??	+2	0	??
Irish Nationalists	6	0	0	6
Independent	1	0	0	1

== Election result ==
Liverpool local election result 1891
Party	Seats	Gains	Losses	Net gain/loss	Seats %	Votes %	Votes	+/−
Conservative	7	1	3	-2	44%	50%	23,384	
Liberal	7	3	1	+2	44%	23%	10,936	
Irish Nationalist	2	0	0	0	13%	6%	3,009	
Labour	0				0%	19%	8,638	
Ind. Conservative	0	0	0	0	0%	1.5%	694	
Parnellist	0	0	0	0	0%	0.028%	13	

== Ward results ==
* - Retiring Councillor seeking re-election

=== Abercromby ===
No. 11 Abercromby
Party	Candidate	Votes	%	±%
Conservative	Dr. Nicholas Kenrick Marsh *	820	53%	
Liberal	Charles Henry Beloe	724	47%	
Majority		96	6%	
Registered electors				
Turnout		1,544		
Conservative hold		Swing		

=== Castle Street ===
No. 6 Castle Street
Party	Candidate	Votes	%	±%
Conservative	William Bartlett *	733	52%	
Liberal	Samuel Hough	677	48%	
Majority		56	4%	
Registered electors				
Turnout		1,410		
Conservative hold		Swing		

=== Everton ===
No. 1 Everton
Party	Candidate	Votes	%	±%
Conservative	John Houlding *	7,100	57%	
Labour	William Nicholson	5,388	43%	
Majority		1,712	14%	
Registered electors				
Turnout		12,488		
Conservative hold		Swing		

=== Exchange ===
No. 5 Exchange
Party	Candidate	Votes	%	±%
Liberal	James Alphonse Doughan	821	51%	
Conservative	Ralph Watts Leyland *	804	49%	
Majority		17	2%	N/A
Registered electors				
Turnout		1,625		
Liberal gain from Conservative		Swing		

=== Great George ===
No. 9 Great George
Party	Candidate	Votes	%	±%
Liberal	James Ruddin *	452	59%	
Conservative	William Roberts	308	41%	
Majority		144	18%	
Registered electors				
Turnout		760		
Liberal hold		Swing		

=== Lime Street ===
No. 12 Lime Street
Party	Candidate	Votes	%	±%
Conservative	Charles Petrie	609	54%	
Liberal	John Henderson	529	46%	
Majority		80	8%	N/A
Registered electors				
Turnout		1,138		
Conservative gain from Liberal		Swing		

=== North Toxteth ===
No. 16 North Toxteth
Party	Candidate	Votes	%	±%
Conservative	William James Burgess	3,375	54%	
Liberal	John Lamport Eills	2,819	46%	
Majority		556	8%	
Registered electors				
Turnout		6,194		
Conservative hold		Swing		

=== Pitt Street ===
No. 8 Pitt Street
Party	Candidate	Votes	%	±%
Liberal	John Scott	325	59%	
Conservative	William King	229	41%	
Majority		96	18%	
Registered electors				
Turnout		554		
Liberal hold		Swing		

=== Rodney Street ===
No. 10 Rodney Street
Party	Candidate	Votes	%	±%
Liberal	William Henry Picton	806	54%	
Ind. Conservative	George Henry Ball	694	46%	
Majority		112	8%	N/A
Registered electors				
Turnout		1,500		
Liberal gain from Conservative		Swing		

=== St. Anne Street ===
No. 13 St. Anne Street
Party	Candidate	Votes	%	±%
Liberal	Samuel McMillin *	833	52%	
Conservative	William Clarkson	751	47%	
Parnellite Nationalist	Thomas O'Brien	13	0.81%	
Majority		82		
Registered electors				
Turnout		1,597		
Liberal hold		Swing		

=== St. Paul's ===
No. 4 St. Paul's
Party	Candidate	Votes	%	±%
Liberal	Richard Robert Meade-King	502	51%	
Conservative	Charles Stewart Dean	475	49%	
Majority		27	2%	N/A
Registered electors				
Turnout		977		
Liberal gain from Conservative		Swing		

=== St. Peter's ===
No. 7 St. Peter's
Party	Candidate	Votes	%	±%
Liberal	George Grierson	521	51%	
Conservative	Arthur Hill Holme	499	49%	
Majority		22	2%	
Registered electors				
Turnout		1,020		
Liberal hold		Swing		

=== Scotland ===
No. 2 Scotland
Party	Candidate	Votes	%	±%
Irish Nationalist	Dr. Alexander Murray Bligh *	2,623	66%	
Conservative	Dr. John Utting	1,330	34%	
Majority		1,293	32%	
Registered electors		6.775		
Turnout		3,953	58%	
Irish Nationalist hold		Swing		

=== South Toxteth ===
No. 15 South Toxteth
Party	Candidate	Votes	%	±%
Conservative	James De Bels Adam	2,256	54%	
Liberal	Joseph Paul Brunner	1,927	46%	
Majority		329	8%	
Registered electors		5,600		
Turnout		4,183	75%	
Conservative hold		Swing		

=== Vauxhall ===
No. 14 Vauxhall
Party	Candidate	Votes	%	±%
Irish Nationalist	Andrew Commins MP *	386	52%	
Conservative	William Henry Edwardes	249	34%	
Labour	Hugh McAleavy	102	14%	
Majority		137	18%	
Registered electors				
Turnout		737		
Irish Nationalist hold		Swing		

=== West Derby ===
No. 14 West Derby
Party	Candidate	Votes	%	±%
Conservative	Edward Hatton Cookson *	3,846	55%	
Labour	William Matain	3,148	45%	
Majority		698	10%	
Registered electors		11,222		
Turnout		6,994	62%	
Conservative hold		Swing		

== By-elections ==
=== No. 2, Scotland, 16 January 1892 ===
Caused by the resignation of Councillor George Jeremy Lynsky (Irish Nationalist, Scotland, elected 1 November 1889) was reported to the council on 6 January 1892 .

Councillor Lynsky resigned his seat to become a candidate for the city coronership.

No. 2 Scotland
Party	Candidate	Votes	%	±%
Irish Nationalist	George Jeremy Lynsky *	Unopposed	N/A	N/A
Registered electors				
Irish Nationalist hold				

=== No. 10, Rodney Street, ===
Caused by the resignation of Councillor Ernest Augustine Gibson (Liberal, Rodney Street, elected 1 November 1889), which was reported to the council on 3 February 1892.

No. 10 Rodney Street
Party	Candidate	Votes	%	±%
Majority				
Registered electors				
Turnout				
	gain from	Swing		

=== No. 1, Everton ward, 16 February 1892 ===
Caused by the death of Councillor Edward Whitley MP (Conservative, Everton ward, elected 1 November 1889).

No. 1 Everton
Party	Candidate	Votes	%	±%
Conservative	Ralph Watts Leyland	4,712	57%	
	Thomas McCracken	3,288	40%	
Independent Irish Nationalist	Patrick Kelly	205	2.5%	
I & T	William Saxton	31		
Majority		1,424		
Registered electors				
Turnout				
Conservative hold		Swing		

=== Aldermanic By-election, 2 March 1892 ===
The death of Alderman William John Lunt on 14 February 1892 was reported to the council on 2 March 1892.

To fill this position Edward Lawrence was elected by the council as an Alderman on 2 March 1892

== See also ==
- Liverpool City Council
- Liverpool Town Council elections 1835 - 1879
- Liverpool City Council elections 1880–present
- Mayors and Lord Mayors of Liverpool 1207 to present
- History of local government in England
