= 1860 Liverpool Town Council election =

English local election

- 1 November 1860

16 seats were up for election: one seat for each of the 16 wards 33 (incl. Aldermen) seats needed for a majority

Elections to Liverpool Town Council were held on Thursday 1 November 1860. One third of the council seats were up for election, the term of office of each councillor being three years.

Thirteen of the sixteen wards were uncontested.

After the election, the composition of the council was:

Party	Councillors	±	Aldermen	Total
Conservative	??	??	??	??
Liberal	??	??	??	??

== Election result ==
Liverpool local election result 1860
Party	Seats	Gains	Losses	Net gain/loss	Seats %	Votes %	Votes	+/−
Conservative	12	1			75%	56%	1,088	
Liberal	1		1			44%	856	

Because only three of the sixteen seats were contested, these statistics should be taken in that context.

== Ward results ==
* - Retiring Councillor seeking re-election

=== Abercromby ===
No. 11 Abercromby
Party	Candidate	Votes	%	±%
Conservative	Robert Hutchinson *	unopposed		
Registered electors				
Conservative hold		Swing		

=== Castle Street ===
No. 6 Castle Street
Party	Candidate	Votes	%	±%
	Edward Estell	unopposed		
Registered electors				
	gain from	Swing		

=== Everton ===
No. 1 Everton
Party	Candidate	Votes	%	±%
Conservative	Daniel Crosthwaite *	598	62%	
Liberal	William Williams	372	38%	
Majority		226	24%	
Registered electors				
Turnout		970		
Conservative hold		Swing		

Time	Daniel Crossthwaite		William Williams	
Time	Votes	%	Votes	%
10:00	130	61%	83	39%
11:00	230	59%	163	41%
12:00	322	60%	219	40%
13:00	395	60%	219	40%
14:00	480	59%	327	41%
15:00	545	61%	353	39%
16:00	598	62%	372	38%

=== Exchange ===
No. 5 Exchange
Party	Candidate	Votes	%	±%
Conservative	Thomas Littledale *	unopposed		
Registered electors				
Conservative hold		Swing		

=== Great George ===
No. 9 Great George
Party	Candidate	Votes	%	±%
Conservative	Thomas Wagstaff *	unopposed		
Registered electors				
Conservative hold		Swing		

=== Lime Street ===
No. 12 Lime Street
Party	Candidate	Votes	%	±%
Conservative	James Johnson *	unopposed		
Registered electors				
Conservative hold		Swing		

=== North Toxteth ===
No. 16 North Toxteth
Party	Candidate	Votes	%	±%
Conservative	Thomas Vernon *	unopposed		
Registered electors				
Conservative hold		Swing		

=== Pitt Street ===
No. 8 Pitt Street
Party	Candidate	Votes	%	±%
Conservative	Samuel Robert Graves *	unopposed		
Registered electors				
Conservative hold		Swing		

=== Rodney Street ===
No. 10 Rodney Street
Party	Candidate	Votes	%	±%
Liberal	Charles Mozley *	unopposed		
Registered electors				
Turnout				
Liberal hold		Swing		

=== St. Anne Street ===
No. 13 St. Anne Street
Party	Candidate	Votes	%	±%
Conservative	Joseph Kitchen *	unopposed		
Registered electors				
Conservative hold		Swing		

=== St. Paul's ===
No. 4 St. Paul's
Party	Candidate	Votes	%	±%
Conservative	William Barton *	unopposed		
Registered electors				
Conservative hold		Swing		

=== St. Peter's ===
No. 7 St. Peter's
Party	Candidate	Votes	%	±%
Conservative	Charles Tricks Bowring *	unopposed		
Registered electors				
Conservative hold		Swing		

=== Scotland ===
No. 2 Scotland
Party	Candidate	Votes	%	±%
	James Crellin *	unopposed		
Registered electors				
		Swing		

=== South Toxteth ===
No. 15 South Toxteth
Party	Candidate	Votes	%	±%
	Joseph Steel	unopposed		
Registered electors				
	gain from	Swing		

=== Vauxhall ===
No. 3 Vauxhall
Party	Candidate	Votes	%	±%
Conservative	William Johnson	132	50.4%	
Liberal	Christopher James Corbally JP *	130	49.6%	
Majority		2	0.8%	N/A
Registered electors		386		
Turnout		262	68%	
Conservative gain from Liberal		Swing		

=== West Derby ===
No. 14 West Derby
Party	Candidate	Votes	%	±%
Conservative	Richard Mitchell Beckwith *	unopposed		
Registered electors				
Conservative hold		Swing		

== See also ==
Liverpool City Council

Liverpool Town Council elections 1835 - 1879

Liverpool City Council elections 1880–present

Mayors and Lord Mayors of Liverpool 1207 to present

History of local government in England
