= 1867 Liverpool Town Council election =

English local election

- November 1, 1867

16 seats were up for election: one seat for each of the 16 wards 33 (incl. Aldermen) seats needed for a majority

Elections to Liverpool Town Council were held on Friday 1 November 1867. One third of the council seats were up for election, the term of office of each councillor being three years.

Twelve of the sixteen wards were uncontested.

After the election, the composition of the council was:

Party	Councillors	±	Aldermen	Total
Conservative	??	??	16	??
Liberal	??	??	0	??

== Election result ==
Liverpool local election result 1867
Party	Seats	Gains	Losses	Net gain/loss	Seats %	Votes %	Votes	+/−
Conservative	10	0	1	-1	62%	56%	1,390	
Liberal	6	1	0	+1	38%	44%	1,087	

Because of the large number of uncontested seats, these statistics should be taken in that context.

== Ward results ==
* - Retiring Councillor seeking re-election

=== Abercromby ===
No. 11 Abercromby
Party	Candidate	Votes	%	±%
Liberal	Robertson Gladstone *	unopposed		
Registered electors				
Liberal hold		Swing		

=== Castle Street ===
No. 6 Castle Street
Party	Candidate	Votes	%	±%
Conservative	Thomas Woodburn	unopposed		
Registered electors				
Conservative hold		Swing		

=== Everton ===
No. 1 Everton
Party	Candidate	Votes	%	±%
Conservative	James Bland	unopposed		
Registered electors				
Conservative hold		Swing		

=== Exchange ===
No. 5 Exchange
Party	Candidate	Votes	%	±%
Conservative	James Tyrer *	305	54%	
Liberal	John Johnson Stitt	261	46%	
Majority		44		
Registered electors				
Turnout		566		
Conservative hold		Swing		

=== Great George ===
No. 9 Great George
Party	Candidate	Votes	%	±%
Conservative	Isaac Jackson *	unopposed		
Registered electors				
Conservative hold		Swing		

=== Lime Street ===
No. 12 Lime Street
Party	Candidate	Votes	%	±%
Liberal	James Allanson Picton *	unopposed		
Registered electors				
Liberal hold		Swing		

=== North Toxteth ===
No. 16 North Toxteth
Party	Candidate	Votes	%	±%
Conservative	Joseph Harrison *	unopposed		
Registered electors				
Conservative hold		Swing		

=== Pitt Street ===
No. 8 Pitt Street
Party	Candidate	Votes	%	±%
Conservative	John Rimmer *	unopposed		
Registered electors				
Conservative hold		Swing		

=== Rodney Street ===
No. 10 Rodney Street
Party	Candidate	Votes	%	±%
Liberal	Philip Henry Rathbone	unopposed		
Registered electors				
Liberal hold		Swing		

=== St. Anne Street ===
No. 13 St. Anne Street
Party	Candidate	Votes	%	±%
Conservative	Dr. John Stopford Taylor *	225	52%	
Liberal	Henry Pooley	209	48%	
Majority		16	4%	
Registered electors				
Turnout		434		
Conservative hold		Swing		

=== St. Paul's ===
No. 4 St. Paul's
Party	Candidate	Votes	%	±%
Liberal	Maurice Williams *	unopposed		
Registered electors				
Liberal hold		Swing		

=== St. Peter's ===
No. 7 St. Peter's
Party	Candidate	Votes	%	±%
Liberal	Jacob Gaitskell Brown	337	51%	
Conservative	Major Richard Fell Steble	327	49%	
Majority		10	2%	N/A
Registered electors				
Turnout		664		
Liberal gain from Conservative		Swing		

=== Scotland ===
No. 2 Scotland
Party	Candidate	Votes	%	±%
Liberal	Joseph Robinson *	unopposed		
Registered electors				
Liberal hold		Swing		

=== South Toxteth ===
No. 15 South Toxteth
Party	Candidate	Votes	%	±%
Conservative	Andrew Barclay Walker	533	56%	
Liberal	Horace Seymour Alpass	280	34%	
Majority		253	22%	
Registered electors				
Turnout		813		
Conservative hold		Swing		

=== Vauxhall ===
No. 3 Vauxhall
Party	Candidate	Votes	%	±%
Conservative	Thomas Rigby*	unopposed		
Registered electors				
Conservative hold		Swing		

=== West Derby ===
No. 14 West Derby
Party	Candidate	Votes	%	±%
Conservative	Edward Samuelson *	unopposed		
Majority				
Registered electors				
Conservative hold		Swing		

== By-elections ==
=== No. 16, North Toxteth, 1 November 1867 ===
Caused by the retirement of Councillor Edward Lawrence (Conservative, North Toxteth, elected 2 November 1865).

No. 16 North Toxteth
Party	Candidate	Votes	%	±%
Conservative	Richard Fell Steble			
Registered electors				
Conservative hold		Swing		

=== Aldermanic By Election, 4 April 1868 ===
Following the death of Alderman James Parker, reported to the Council on 1 April 1868, John Weightman was elected as an alderman on 4 April 1868.

=== No. 5, Exchange, 22 April 1868 ===
Caused by the death of Councillor William Barry (Liberal, Exchange, elected unopposed 1 November 1866) which was reported to the Council on 29 April 1868

No. 5 Exchange
Party	Candidate	Votes	%	±%
Conservative	Fletcher Rogers			
Majority				
Registered electors				
Turnout				
Conservative gain from Liberal		Swing		

=== No. 5, Exchange, June 1868 ===
Caused by the resignation of Councillor John Swainson (Exchange, elected 1 November 1865), reported to the Council on 3 June 1868

No. 5 Exchange
Party	Candidate	Votes	%	±%
Liberal	John Johnson Stitt			
Majority				
Registered electors				
Turnout				
Liberal gain from Conservative		Swing		

== See also ==
- Liverpool City Council
- Liverpool Town Council elections 1835 - 1879
- Liverpool City Council elections 1880–present
- Mayors and Lord Mayors of Liverpool 1207 to present
- History of local government in England
