= 1895 Liverpool City Council election =

1895 English local election

- November 1, 1895

Following boundary changes and an increase in the number of wards from 16 to 28, 84 seats were up for election: three seats for each of the 28 wards 57 (incl. Aldermen) seats needed for a majority

Elections to Liverpool City Council were held on Thursday 1 November 1895. This was an 'all up' election following boundary changes which extended the area of the city and increased the number of wards from 16 to 28. Three councillors were elected for each ward. The candidate with the most votes was elected for three years, the candidate with the second highest number of votes was elected for two years and the candidate with the third highest number of votes was elected for one year.

After the election, the composition of the council was:

Party	Councillors	±	Aldermen	Total
Conservative	59	N/A	??	??
Liberal	14	N/A	??	??
Irish Nationalists	9	N/A	??	??
Liberal Unionist Party	2	N/A	??	??

== Election result ==
Liverpool local election result 1895
Party	Seats	Gains	Losses	Net gain/loss	Seats %	Votes %	Votes	+/−
Conservative	59	N/A	N/A	N/A		34%	20,869	N/A
Liberal	14	N/A	N/A	N/A		29%	17,914	N/A
Irish Nationalist	9	N/A	N/A	N/A		9.4%	5,860	N/A
Liberal Unionist	2	N/A	N/A	N/A		3.8%	2,366	N/A
Independent	0	N/A	N/A	N/A	0%	3.6%	2,236	N/A
Independent Liberal	0	N/A	N/A	N/A	0%	3.4%	2,134	N/A
Labour	0	N/A	N/A	N/A	0%	2.6%	1,595	N/A
Socialist	0	N/A	N/A	N/A	0%	1.1%	711	N/A
Independent Irish Nationalist	0	N/A	N/A	N/A	0%	0.21%	131	N/A

== Ward results ==
* - Retiring Councillor seeking re-election

=== Abercromby ===
A parish ward, formerly Abercromby and part of Rodney Street ward.

No. 21 Abercromby
Party	Candidate	Votes	%	±%
Conservative	Maxwell Hyslop Maxwell jr.	1,151	50%	N/A
Conservative	Thomas Menlove	1,131	49%	N/A
Conservative	Morris Paterson Jones	1,043	45%	N/A
Liberal	Archibald Williamson	996	43%	N/A
Liberal	David Davies	845	36%	N/A
Independent	John Bond	176	8%	N/A
Majority		155		
Registered electors		3,034		
Turnout		2,323	77%	
Conservative win (new seat)				
Conservative win (new seat)				
Conservative win (new seat)				

=== Breckfield ===
Formerly part of Everton and Kirkdale ward.

No. 6 Breckfield
Party	Candidate	Votes	%	±%
Conservative	George Hampson Morrisson	1,489	68%	N/A
Conservative	William Hall Walker	1,469	67%	N/A
Conservative	Louis Samuel Cohen	1,429		N/A
Liberal	Charles Gittins	405	19%	N/A
Socialist	John Rumney Taylor Mawson	294	13%	N/A
Majority		1,084		N/A
Registered electors		3,964		
Turnout		2,188	55%	
Conservative win (new seat)				
Conservative win (new seat)				
Conservative win (new seat)				

=== Brunswick ===
Formerly part of the Toxteth Park ward.

No. 25 Brunswick
Party	Candidate	Votes	%	±%
Liberal	Charles Henry Beloe	950	34%	N/A
Conservative	Hartley Wilson	915	33%	N/A
Conservative	Charles Arden	914	33%	N/A
Conservative	Robert Stephen Porter	889	32%	N/A
Irish Nationalist	John Shannon	904	33%	N/A
Irish Nationalist	John Predeville	890	32%	N/A
Independent	Thomas Middleton	93	3%	N/A
Majority		35		N/A
Registered electors		3,003		
Turnout		2,769	92%	N/A
Liberal win (new seat)				
Conservative win (new seat)				
Conservative win (new seat)				

=== Castle Street ===
Parish ward

No. 18 Castle Street
Party	Candidate	Votes	%	±%
Liberal Unionist	Henry Hugh Hornby	869	40%	N/A
Conservative	William Bartlett	796	36%	N/A
Conservative	Joseph Bond Morgan	737	34%	N/A
Liberal	John Henderson	521	24%	N/A
Majority				N/A
Registered electors		2,133		
Turnout				N/A
Liberal Unionist win (new seat)				
Conservative win (new seat)				
Conservative win (new seat)				

=== Dingle ===
Formerly part of Toxteth Park ward

No. 26 Dingle
Party	Candidate	Votes	%	±%
Conservative	Joseph Ball	1,856	65%	N/A
Conservative	Thomas Evans	1,823	64%	N/A
Conservative	William Roberts	1,823	64%	N/A
Independent Liberal	Thomas Byrne	980	35%	N/A
Majority				N/A
Registered electors		5,213		
Turnout				N/A
Conservative win (new seat)				
Conservative win (new seat)				
Conservative win (new seat)				

=== Edge Hill ===
formerly part of West Derby ward.

No. 12 Edge Hill
Party	Candidate	Votes	%	±%
Conservative	Jonathan Parry	1,727	70%	N/A
Conservative	Edward Hatton Cookson	1,622	66%	N/A
Conservative	Samuel Wasse Higginbottom	1,559	64%	N/A
Labour	Samuel Reeves	726	30%	N/A
Independent Liberal	Thomas Shufflebottom	409	17%	N/A
Majority				N/A
Registered electors		4,572		
Turnout				N/A
Conservative win (new seat)				
Conservative win (new seat)				
Conservative win (new seat)				

=== Everton ===
formerly part of Everton and Kirkdale ward.

No. 9 Everton
Party	Candidate	Votes	%	±%
Liberal Unionist	William Oulton	1,497	37%	N/A
Conservative	Edward Lewis Lloyd	1,469	36%	N/A
Conservative	John Richard Pritchard	1,437	35%	N/A
Liberal	William Denton	1,096	27%	N/A
Liberal	William Boyle	1,059	26%	N/A
Liberal	Arthur Augustus Fownes	988	24%	N/A
Labour	William Brinton	233	24%	N/A
Majority				N/A
Registered electors		4,716		
Turnout				N/A
Liberal Unionist win (new seat)				
Conservative win (new seat)				
Conservative win (new seat)				

=== Exchange ===
Parish ward.

No. 16 Exchange
Party	Candidate	Votes	%	±%
Liberal	Robert Durning Holt *	772	48%	N/A
Conservative	John Sutherland Harmood-Banner	749	47%	N/A
Liberal	Edmond Brownbill *	689	43%	N/A
Liberal	James Alphonse Doughan *	685	43%	N/A
Independent	Joseph Blackburn	88	5%	N/A
Independent	Gustav Morris	80	5%	N/A
Majority				N/A
Registered electors		2,014		
Turnout				N/A
Conservative win (new seat)				
Liberal win (new seat)				
Liberal win (new seat)				

=== Fairfield ===
No. 4 Fairfield
Party	Candidate	Votes	%	±%
Conservative	Thomas Hewitson	1,110	64%	N/A
Conservative	Thomas May Smith	1,058	61%	N/A
Conservative	Frank John Leslie	1,044	60%	N/A
Liberal	Herbert Watts M. A.	522	30%	N/A
Independent	John Bryant	114	7%	N/A
Majority				N/A
Registered electors		3,199		
Turnout				N/A
Conservative win (new seat)				
Conservative win (new seat)				
Conservative win (new seat)				

=== Granby ===
formerly part of Toxteth Park ward.

No. 22 Granby - 3 seats
Party	Candidate	Votes	%	±%
Conservative	Herbert Campbell	1,229	51%	N/A
Conservative	Albert Henry Samuel	1,210	50%	N/A
Liberal	John Lea	1,204	49%	N/A
Conservative	Arthur Noel Newling	1,185	49%	N/A
Liberal	John Morris	1,137	47%	N/A
Liberal	Joseph Harrison Jones	1,102	45%	N/A
Majority				N/A
Registered electors		3,866		
Turnout				N/A
Conservative win (new seat)				
Conservative win (new seat)				
Liberal win (new seat)				

=== Great George ===
Parish ward. Formerly Great George plus part of Rodney Street ward.

No. 20 Great George - 3 seats
Party	Candidate	Votes	%	±%
Liberal	Simeon Smith	767	51%	N/A
Conservative	George Henry Ball	751	49%	N/A
Liberal	John Lamport Eills	718	47%	N/A
Liberal	William Henry Picton	713	47%	N/A
Majority				N/A
Registered electors		2,276		
Turnout				N/A
Liberal win (new seat)				
Conservative win (new seat)				
Liberal win (new seat)				

=== Kensington ===
formerly part of West Derby ward.

No. 11 Kensington
Party	Candidate	Votes	%	±%
Conservative	Thomas Clarke	1,552	49%	N/A
Conservative	Edward Barnes	1,316	42%	N/A
Conservative	William Henry Edwardes	1,190	38%	N/A
Independent	William Boote	934	30%	N/A
Liberal	William Henry Watts jun	680	21%	N/A
Labour	Isaac Newton	380	12%	N/A
Majority				N/A
Registered electors		4,027		
Turnout				N/A
Conservative win (new seat)				
Conservative win (new seat)				
Conservative win (new seat)				

=== Kirkdale ===
Formerly part of Everton and Kirkdale ward.

No. 2 Kirkdale - 3 seats
Party	Candidate	Votes	%	±%
Conservative	Joseph Hoult	1,974	68%	N/A
Conservative	John Wilson	1,883	65%	N/A
Conservative	Robert Thompson	1,878	65%	N/A
Liberal	Richard Joseph Swyny	692	24%	N/A
Liberal	Bernard McKenna	685	24%	N/A
Liberal	Michael Bolger	653	22%	N/A
Socialist	John James Jones	239	8%	N/A
Majority				N/A
Registered electors		6,023		
Turnout				N/A
Conservative win (new seat)				
Conservative win (new seat)				
Conservative win (new seat)				

=== Low Hill ===
Formerly part of West Derby ward.

No. 10 Low Hill - 3 seats
Party	Candidate	Votes	%	±%
Conservative	Ephraim Walker	1,475	53%	N/A
Conservative	Charles Petrie	1,459	53%	N/A
Conservative	Charles Stewart Dean	1,379	50%	N/A
Liberal	Joseph George McCann	1,091	39%	N/A
Liberal	William Nash	932		N/A
Liberal	David Matthews	819	30%	N/A
Socialist	William Hastings	209	8%	N/A
Conservative win (new seat)				
Conservative win (new seat)				
Conservative win (new seat)				

=== Netherfield ===
Formerly part of Everton and Kirkdale ward.

No. 8 Netherfield
Party	Candidate	Votes	%	±%
Conservative	John Robert Fletcher	1,112	56%	N/A
Conservative	Simon Jude	1,087	55%	N/A
Conservative	William Watson Rutherford	1,032	52%	N/A
Liberal	John Carr	741	40%	N/A
Liberal	Samuel Robert Thomas	234	12%	N/A
Liberal	John Henry Naylor	168	9%	N/A
Socialist	William Wilcockson	79	4%	N/A
Majority				N/A
Registered electors		4,276		
Turnout				N/A
Conservative win (new seat)				
Conservative win (new seat)				
Conservative win (new seat)				

=== North Scotland ===
Parish ward.

No. 13 North Scotland - 3 seats
Party	Candidate	Votes	%	±%
Irish Nationalist	James Bolger	1,046	71%	N/A
Irish Nationalist	James Daly	1,041	71%	N/A
Irish Nationalist	Edward Purcell	1,025	70%	N/A
Conservative	George Turner	419	29%	N/A
Majority				N/A
Registered electors		2,936		
Turnout				N/A
Irish Nationalist win (new seat)				
Irish Nationalist win (new seat)				
Irish Nationalist win (new seat)				

=== North Walton ===
No. 27 North Walton - 3 seats
Party	Candidate	Votes	%	±%
Conservative	Richard Kelly	1,160	42%	N/A
Conservative	John Harvey Farmer	840	30%	N/A
Liberal	William Pickles Hartley	820	30%	N/A
Ind. Conservative	Henry Sharrock	782	28%	N/A
Conservative	Thomas Alfred Bell	755	27%	N/A
Liberal	Thomas Macreavey	671	24%	N/A
Independent	James Morgan	397	14%	N/A
Majority				N/A
Registered electors		3,103		
Turnout				N/A
Conservative win (new seat)				
Conservative win (new seat)				
Liberal win (new seat)				

=== Prince's Park ===
No. 23 Prince's Park
Party	Candidate	Votes	%	±%
Conservative	William James Burgess	unopposed		
Conservative	Walter William Thomas	unopposed		
Conservative	William Edward Willink	unopposed		
Registered electors				
Conservative win (new seat)				
Conservative win (new seat)				
Conservative win (new seat)				

=== Sandhills ===
Formerly part of Everton and Kirkdale ward.

No. 1 Sandhills
Party	Candidate	Votes	%	±%
Liberal	William Rowlandson	1,043	36%	N/A
Liberal	William Nelson	1,034	36%	N/A
Irish Nationalist	Patrick Joseph Deery	954	33%	N/A
Conservative	George Lewis Mead	885	31%	N/A
Conservative	John Thomas Wood	867	30%	N/A
Conservative	Robert Carruthers	853	30%	N/A
Socialist	Arthur Edward Finn	129	4%	N/A
Majority				N/A
Registered electors		3,197		
Turnout				N/A
Liberal win (new seat)				
Liberal win (new seat)				
Irish Nationalist win (new seat)				

=== St. Anne's ===
Parish ward. Formerly St. Anne Street plus Lime Street.

No. 17 St. Anne's - 3 seats
Party	Candidate	Votes	%	±%
Liberal	Jeremiah Miles	1,202	38%	N/A
Liberal	Jacob Reuben Grant	1,155	37%	N/A
Conservative	Richard Ripley	1,104	35%	N/A
Liberal	Eli Brooks	1,085	35%	N/A
Independent Liberal	Samuel McMillan	745	24%	N/A
Independent	Joseph Lancaster	123	4%	N/A
Independent	George Tregilgas	81	3%	N/A
Independent	John O'Brien	76	2%	N/A
Majority				N/A
Registered electors		3,376		
Turnout				N/A
Liberal win (new seat)				
Liberal win (new seat)				
Conservative win (new seat)				

=== St. Domingo ===
Formerly part of Everton and Kirkdale ward.

No. 7 St. Domingo - 3 seats
Party	Candidate	Votes	%	±%
Conservative	John Houlding	1,558	60%	N/A
Conservative	Robert Alfred Hampson	1,457	64%	N/A
Conservative	Joseph Bennett Colton	1,442	64%	N/A
Liberal	Thomas Pritchard	562	25%	N/A
Liberal	Robert Ingman	537	24%	N/A
Liberal	Robert Evan Bridson	530	23%	N/A
Labour	John Callow	150	7%	N/A
Labour	Clement William George	106	5%	N/A
Labour	Robert Clement Falkener	74	3%	N/A
Majority				N/A
Registered electors		4,519		
Turnout				N/A
Conservative win (new seat)				
Conservative win (new seat)				
Conservative win (new seat)				

=== St. Peter's ===
Parish ward. Formerly St. Peters plus Pitt Street wards.

No. 19 St. Peter's - 3 seats
Party	Candidate	Votes	%	±%
Conservative	Charles George Dean	756	48%	N/A
Liberal	William Henry Watts	692	44%	N/A
Liberal	Samuel Hough	659	42%	N/A
Liberal	Thomas Donnelly	591	37%	N/A
Independent Irish Nationalist	Bernard McBennett	131	8%	N/A
Majority				N/A
Registered electors		2,082		
Turnout				N/A
Conservative win (new seat)				
Liberal win (new seat)				
Liberal win (new seat)				

=== Sefton Park ===
No. 24 Sefton Park
Party	Candidate	Votes	%	±%
Conservative	Francis Henderson	1,287	54%	N/A
Conservative	Augustus Frederick Warr	1,243	52%	N/A
Conservative	Richard Dart	1,221	51%	N/A
Liberal	Robert Kirkland	1,092	46%	N/A
Liberal	Edward Paull	1,036	44%	N/A
Liberal	Robert McDuff	905	38%	N/A
Majority				N/A
Registered electors		3,718		
Turnout				N/A
Conservative win (new seat)				
Conservative win (new seat)				
Conservative win (new seat)				

=== South Scotland ===
Parish ward.

No. 14 South Scotland - 3 seats
Party	Candidate	Votes	%	±%
Irish Nationalist	George Jeremy Lynskey	1,040	50%	N/A
Irish Nationalist	Patrick Kearney	1,019	49%	N/A
Irish Nationalist	Owen O'Hara	1,012	49%	N/A
Independent Irish Nationalist	John O'Shea	561	27%	N/A
Conservative	William Williamson	485	23%	N/A
Majority				N/A
Registered electors		3,513		
Turnout				N/A
Irish Nationalist win (new seat)				
Irish Nationalist win (new seat)				
Irish Nationalist win (new seat)				

=== South Walton ===
No. 3 South Walton
Party	Candidate	Votes	%	±%
Conservative	John Ellison	1,170	55%	N/A
Conservative	Robert Clasbar	1,130	54%	N/A
Conservative	Henry Richard Powell	1,116	53%	N/A
Liberal	Arthur Henry Bunney	941	45%	N/A
Liberal	William Evans	933	44%	N/A
Liberal	Nathaniel Topp	910	43%	N/A
Majority				N/A
Registered electors		3,625		
Turnout				N/A
Conservative win (new seat)				
Conservative win (new seat)				
Conservative win (new seat)				

=== Vauxhall ===
Parish ward. Formerly Vauxhall plus St. Pauls.

No. 15 Vauxhall - 3 seats
Party	Candidate	Votes	%	±%
Irish Nationalist	John Gregory Taggart *	763	37%	N/A
Irish Nationalist	Thomas John Flynn *	762	36%	N/A
Liberal	Richard Robert Meade-King *	751	36%	N/A
Conservative	Thomas Binley Neale	574	27%	N/A
Majority				N/A
Registered electors		2,213		
Turnout				N/A
Irish Nationalist win (new seat)				
Irish Nationalist win (new seat)				
Liberal win (new seat)				

=== Wavertree ===
No. 5 Wavertree
Party	Candidate	Votes	%	±%
Conservative	Isaac Turner	966	56%	N/A
Conservative	Arthur Crosthwaite	934	54%	N/A
Conservative	Henry Arthur Watson	915	53%	N/A
Liberal	John Kellitt	765	44%	N/A
Liberal	Charles William Jones	757	44%	N/A
Liberal	John Hicks	732	42%	N/A
Majority				N/A
Registered electors		2,372		
Turnout				N/A
Conservative win (new seat)				
Conservative win (new seat)				
Conservative win (new seat)				

=== West Derby ===
No. 28 West Derby
Party	Candidate	Votes	%	±%
Conservative	James Lister	1,205	59%	N/A
Conservative	Robert Edward Walkington Stephenson	1,173	58%	N/A
Conservative	William Craigie Williams	1,057	52%	N/A
Liberal	Thomas Utley	832	41%	N/A
Liberal	James McDonnell	746	37%	N/A
Liberal	Henry Cartwright Gillmore	676	33%	N/A
Majority				N/A
Registered electors		2,963		
Turnout				N/A
Conservative win (new seat)				
Conservative win (new seat)				
Conservative win (new seat)				

== Aldermanic Elections ==
Following the expiry of the terms of office of eight aldermen at the Council meeting on 9 November 1895 the following were elected as aldermen by the Council, according to the provisions of the Municipal Corporation Act, 1882.

* re-elected alderman

Party	Alderman
Conservative	Joseph Ball JP
Conservative	Sir Arthur Bower Forwood Bart. MP *
Conservative	Sir William Bower Forwood JP *
Conservative	Alexander Garnett JP *
Conservative	Thomas Hughes JP *
Conservative	Thomas William Oakshott JP *
Conservative	William Radcliffe JP *

Six additional aldermen were elected by the Council following nominations by the Urban District Councils of the added areas, under section 7 of the Local Government Board's Provisional Order Confirmation (No. 10) Act, 1895.

Urban District Council	ward	Party	Alderman	Term expires
Walton	North Walton		Joseph Glover	1901
Walton	South Walton		Thomas Henry Williams JP	1898
West Derby	Fairfield	Conservative	Charles Herbert Giles	1898
West Derby	West Derby	Conservative	Hugh McCubbin	1901
Wavertree	Wavertree	Conservative	Joachim Nicolas Stolterfoht JP	1901
Toxteth Park	Toxteth Park	Conservative	William Humphrey Williams	1898

Six additional aldermen were elected by the Council pursuant to the Local Government Board's Provisional Order Confirmation (No. 10) Act, 1895.

Party	Alderman
Conservative	William Bartlett
Conservative	Edward Hatton Cookson
Conservative	John Houlding
Conservative	Thomas Menlove
Conservative	Joseph Bond Morgan
Conservative	Ephraim Walker

== By-elections ==
=== No.7, St. Domingo ===
Caused by the election of Councillor John Houlding (Conservative, St. Domingo, elected 1 November 1895) as an alderman by the Council on 9 November 1895.

No. 7 St. Domingo
Party	Candidate	Votes	%	±%
Conservative	Anthony Shelmerdine	919	73%	
Liberal	Thomas Pritchard	247	20%	
Labour	Clement William George	99	7.8%	
Majority		672		
Registered electors		4,519		
Turnout		1,265	28%	
Conservative hold		Swing		

=== No. 10, Low Hill ===
Caused by the election of Councillor Ephraim Walker (Conservative, Low Hill, elected 1 November 1896) as an alderman by the Council on 9 November 1895.

No. 10 Low Hill
Party	Candidate	Votes	%	±%
Conservative	George Jones	1,124	50%	
Liberal	Joseph George McCann	1,086	48%	
Socialist	William Hastings	55	2.4%	
Majority		38		
Registered electors		4,030		
Turnout		2,265	56%	
Conservative hold		Swing		

=== No. 12, Edge Hill ===
Caused by the election of Councillor Edward Hatton Cookson (Conservative, Edge Hill, elected 1 November 1895) as an alderman by the Council on 9 November 1895.

No. 12 Edge Hill
Party	Candidate	Votes	%	±%
Conservative	James Barclay Light	1,163	59%	
	William Boote	815	41%	
Majority		348		
Registered electors		4,572		
Turnout		1,978	43%	
Conservative hold		Swing		

=== No. 18, Castle Street ===
Caused by the election of Councillors William Bartlett (Conservative, Castle Street, elected 1 November 1895) and Joseph Bond Morgan (Conservative, Castle Street, elected 1 November 1895) as an alderman by the Council on 9 November 1895.

No. 12 Castle Street - 2 seats
Party	Candidate	Votes	%	±%
Conservative	John Lawrence	unopposed		
Conservative	John Thomas Wood	unopposed		
Registered electors		4,572		
Conservative hold		Swing		
Conservative hold		Swing		

=== No. 21, Abercromby ===
Caused by the election of Councillor Thomas Menlove (Conservative, Abercromby, elected 1 November 1895) as an alderman by the Council on 9 November 1895.

No. 21 Abercromby
Party	Candidate	Votes	%	±%
Conservative	Lorents Braun Haddock	unopposed		
Registered electors		3,034		
Conservative hold		Swing		

=== No. 26, Dingle ===
Caused by the election of Councillor Joseph Ball (Conservative, Dingle, elected 1 November 1895) as an alderman by the Council on 9 November 1895.

No. 26 Dingle
Party	Candidate	Votes	%	±%
Conservative	Edward James Chevalier	1,762	62%	
	Thomas Byrne	1,071	38%	
Majority		691		
Registered electors		5,213		
Turnout		2,833	54%	
Conservative hold		Swing		

=== No. 17, St. Anne's, 17 December 1895 ===
Alderman Philip Henry Rathbone died on 22 November 1895.

In his place, Councillor Jeremiah Miles (Liberal, St. Anne's, elected 1 November 1895) was elected as an alderman by the Council on 4 December 1895 .

No. 17 St. Anne's
Party	Candidate	Votes	%	±%
Liberal	James Crean	894	75%	
	Edward Joseph Gearing	235	20%	
	George Tregilgas	64	5%	
Majority		659		
Registered electors		3,376		
Turnout		1,193	35%	
Liberal hold		Swing		

=== No. 18, Castle Street, 19 February 1896 ===
Following the death of Alderman Henry Charles Hawley on 8 January 1896 , Councillor Henry Hugh Hornby JP (Liberal Unionist, Castle Street, elected 1 November 1895) was elected by the Council as an alderman on 5 February 1896 , necessitating a by-election in the Castle Street ward.

No. 12 Castle Street
Party	Candidate	Votes	%	±%
Conservative	Thomas Binley Neale	unopposed		
Registered electors		4,572		
Conservative gain from Liberal Unionist		Swing		

=== No. 10, Low Hill, 15 March 1896 ===
Caused by the resignation of Councillor Charles Stewart Dean (Conservative, Low Hill, elected 1 November 1895), which was reported to the Council on 4 March 1896.

No. 10 Low Hill
Party	Candidate	Votes	%	±%
	Archilbald Tutton Salvidge the younger	unopposed		
Registered electors		4,030		
		Swing		

=== No.17, St. Anne's, 16 June 1896 ===
Caused by the resignation of Councillor Richard Ripley (Conservative, St. Anne's, elected 1 November 1895) was reported to the Council on 3 June 1896 .

No. 17 St. Anne's
Party	Candidate	Votes	%	±%
	Eli Brooke	605	82%	
	Joseph Lancaster	76	10%	
	Edward Phillips	53	7%	
Majority		529		
Registered electors		3,376		
Turnout		734	22%	
		Swing		

== See also ==
- Liverpool City Council
- Liverpool Town Council elections 1835 - 1879
- Liverpool City Council elections 1880–present
- Mayors and Lord Mayors of Liverpool 1207 to present
- History of local government in England
