= 1889 Liverpool City Council election =

Liverpool Town Council elections 1889

- November 1, 1889

16 seats were up for election (one third): one seat for each of the 16 wards 33 (incl. Aldermen) seats needed for a majority

Elections to Liverpool City Council were held on Friday 1 November 1889. One third of the council seats were up for election, the term of office of each councillor being three years.

Four of the sixteen seats were uncontested.

After the election, the composition of the council was:

Party	Councillors	±	Aldermen	Total
Conservative	??	-5	16	??
Liberal	??	+4	0	??
Irish Nationalists	4	+2	0	4
Irish Home Rule	2	-2	0	2
Liberal Unionist	1	+1	0	1

== Election result ==
Liverpool local election result 1889
Party	Seats	Gains	Losses	Net gain/loss	Seats %	Votes %	Votes	+/−
Conservative	7	0	5	-5	44%	57%	16,723	
Liberal	6	4	0	+4	50%	18%	5,163	
Irish Nationalist	2	2	0	+2	13%	19%	5,423	
Liberal Unionist	1	1	0	+1	6.3%			
Labour	0	0	0	0	0%	5.5%	1,602	

== Ward results ==
* - Retiring Councillor seeking re-election

=== Abercromby ===
No. 11 Abercromby
Party	Candidate	Votes	%	±%
Conservative	Thomas Menlove *	757	53%	
Liberal	John Lea	684	47%	
Majority		73	6%	
Registered electors		2,210		
Turnout		1,441	65%	
Conservative hold		Swing		

=== Castle Street ===
No. 6 Castle Street
Party	Candidate	Votes	%	±%
Liberal Unionist	Henry Hugh Hornby	unopposed		
Registered electors				
Liberal Unionist gain from Conservative		Swing		

=== Everton ===
No. 1 Everton
Party	Candidate	Votes	%	±%
Conservative	Edward Whitley MP *	5,433	84%	
Irish Nationalist	Thomas Kelly	1,050	16%	
Majority		4,383	68%	
Registered electors		23,228		
Turnout		6,483	28%	
Conservative hold		Swing		

=== Exchange ===
No. 5 Exchange
Party	Candidate	Votes	%	±%
Liberal	Robert Durning Holt *	Unopposed	N/A	N/A
Registered electors				
Liberal hold				

=== Great George ===
No. 9 Great George
Party	Candidate	Votes	%	±%
Liberal	William Whitely	423	54%	
Conservative	William Roberts	364	46%	
Majority		59	8%	N/A
Registered electors		1,079		
Turnout		787	73%	
Liberal gain from Conservative		Swing		

=== Lime Street ===
No. 12 Lime Street
Party	Candidate	Votes	%	±%
Conservative	John Duncan the younger *	unopposed		
Registered electors				
Conservative hold		Swing		

=== North Toxteth ===
No. 16 North Toxteth
Party	Candidate	Votes	%	±%
Conservative	Herbert Campbell *	2,135	71%	
Irish Nationalist	Michael McGrath	893	29%	
Majority		1,242	42%	
Registered electors		9,549		
Turnout		3,028	32%	
Conservative hold		Swing		

=== Pitt Street ===
No. 8 Pitt Street
Party	Candidate	Votes	%	±%
Liberal	Henry Charles Hawley *	unopposed		
Registered electors				
Liberal hold		Swing		

=== Rodney Street ===
No. 10 Rodney Street
Party	Candidate	Votes	%	±%
Liberal	Ernest Augustine Gibson	721	51%	
Conservative	Matthew Henry Larmor	682	49%	
Majority		39	2%	N/A
Registered electors		2,275		
Turnout		1,403	62%	
Liberal gain from Conservative		Swing		

=== St. Anne Street ===
No. 13 St. Anne Street
Party	Candidate	Votes	%	±%
Conservative	Arthur John Jones Bamford	640	43%	
Liberal	Jacob Reuben Grant	613	41%	
	Henry Cartwright Gilmore	247	16%	
Majority		27		
Registered electors		2,080		
Turnout		1,500	72%	
Conservative hold		Swing		

=== St. Paul's ===
No. 4 St. Paul's
Party	Candidate	Votes	%	±%
Liberal	Philip Henry Rathbone	520	54%	
Conservative	Sylvester Mattison *	450	46%	
Majority		70	8%	N/A
Registered electors		1,353		
Turnout		970	72%	
Liberal gain from Conservative		Swing		

=== St. Peter's ===
No. 7 St. Peter's
Party	Candidate	Votes	%	±%
Liberal	William Henry Watts	609	54%	
Conservative	Isaac Morris *	515	45%	
Majority		94		N/A
Registered electors		1,479		
Turnout		1,124	76%	
Liberal gain from Conservative		Swing		

=== Scotland ===
No. 2 Scotland
Party	Candidate	Votes	%	±%
Irish Nationalist	George Jeremy Lynskey	2,890	77%	
Conservative	Harry Thomas	858	23%	
Majority		2,032	54%	N/A
Registered electors		6,832		
Turnout		3,748	56%	
Irish Nationalist gain from Home Rule		Swing		

=== South Toxteth ===
No. 15 South Toxteth
Party	Candidate	Votes	%	±%
Conservative	Thomas Evans	1,717	52%	
Liberal	John Thomas	1,593	48%	
Majority		124	4%	
Registered electors		5,468		
Turnout		3,310	61%	
Conservative hold		Swing		

=== Vauxhall ===
No. 3 Vauxhall
Party	Candidate	Votes	%	±%
Irish Nationalist	John Gregory Taggart	574	73%	
Conservative	Henry Fitzwilliam Neale	214	27%	
Majority		360	46%	N/A
Registered electors		1,174		
Turnout		788	67%	
Irish Nationalist gain from Home Rule		Swing		

=== West Derby ===
No. 14 West Derby
Party	Candidate	Votes	%	±%
Conservative	Ephraim Walker	2,958	65%	
Labour	William Matkin	1,602	35%	
Majority		1.356	30%	
Registered electors		10,448		
Turnout		4,560	44%	
Conservative hold		Swing		

== Aldermanic Election ==
At the meeting of the Council on 9 November 1892, the terms of office of eight alderman expired.

The following eight were elected as Aldermen by the Council (Aldermen and Councillors) on 9 November 1889 for a term of six years.

* - re-elected aldermen.

Party	Alderman
Conservative	Anthony Bower *
Conservative	Arthur Bower Forwood *
Conservative	Sir William Bower Forwood *
Conservative	Alexander Garnett *
Conservative	Edward Grindley *
Conservative	Sir David Radcliffe *
Conservative	William Radcliffe
Conservative	Edward Samuelson *

== By-elections ==
=== No. 15, South Toxteth, Tuesday 26 November 1889 ===
Caused by the election of William Radcliffe (Conservative, South Toxteth, elected 1 November 1888) being elected as an alderman on 9 November 1889

No. 15 South Toxteth
Party	Candidate	Votes	%	±%
Conservative	James De Bels Adam	1,734	45%	
Liberal	John Thomas	1,699	44%	
	Harry Thomas	398	10%	
Majority		135		
Registered electors		5,468		
Turnout		3,831	70%	
Conservative hold		Swing		

=== No. 14, West Derby, Tuesday 17 December 1889 ===
Following the resignation of Sir Andrew Barclay Walker as an alderman , Councillor William John Lunt (Conservative, West Derby, elected 1 November 1887) was elected as an Alderman by the Council on 4 December 1889 .

No. 14 West Derby
Party	Candidate	Votes	%	±%
Conservative	George Barrell Rodway	2,384	60%	
Labour	William Matkin	1,566	40%	
Majority		818	20%	
Registered electors		10,448		
Turnout		3,950	38%	
Conservative hold		Swing		

=== No. 12, Lime Street, Tuesday 25 February 1890 ===
The resignation of Alderman Sir David Radcliffe was reported to the Council on 8 January 1890 .

Councillor Thomas William Oakshott (Conservative. Lime Street, elected 1 November 1887) , was elected as an Alderman by the Council on 5 February 1890 .

No. 12 Lime Street
Party	Candidate	Votes	%	±%
Liberal	Thomas Davy Laurence	574	54%	
Conservative	Isaac Morris	496	46%	
Majority		78	8%	N/A
Registered electors				
Turnout		1,070		
Liberal gain from Conservative		Swing		

=== No. 3, Vauxhall, Friday 23 May 1890 ===
The death, on 5 May 1890, of Councillor Patrick Byrne (Irish Home Rule, Vauxhall, elected 1 November 1887) was reported to the Council on 7 May 1890 .

No. 3 Vauxhall
Party	Candidate	Votes	%	±%
Irish Nationalist	Thomas Kelly	394	52%	
Conservative	Henry Fitzwilliam Neale	218	29%	
	Patrick Joseph Deery	149	20%	
Majority		176		
Registered electors		1,174		
Turnout		761	65%	
Irish Nationalist gain from Home Rule		Swing		

== See also ==
- Liverpool City Council
- Liverpool Town Council elections 1835 - 1879
- Liverpool City Council elections 1880–present
- Mayors and Lord Mayors of Liverpool 1207 to present
- History of local government in England
