= 1883 Liverpool City Council election =

Liverpool City Council elections 1883

- November 1, 1883

16 seats were up for election (one third): one seat for each of the 16 wards 33 (incl. Aldermen) seats needed for a majority

Elections to Liverpool City Council were held on Thursday 1 November 1883. One third of the council seats were up for election, the term of office of each councillor being three years.

This was the first local election since the passing of the Corrupt and Illegal Practices Prevention Act 1883 which "criminalised attempts to bribe voters and standardised the amount that could be spent on election expenses" and introduced election agents.

Twelve of the sixteen seats were uncontested.

After the election, the composition of the council was:

Party	Councillors	±	Aldermen	Total
Conservative	23	??	16	39
Liberal	19	??	0	19
Irish Home Rule	4	0	0	4

== Election result ==
Liverpool local election result 1883
Party	Seats	Gains	Losses	Net gain/loss	Seats %	Votes %	Votes	+/−
Conservative	7							
Liberal	9					61.48%	3,972	
Home Rule	0	0	-1	-1		38.52%	2,489	

== Ward results ==
* - Retiring Councillor seeking re-election

=== Abercromby ===
No. 11 Abercromby
Party	Candidate	Votes	%	±%
Liberal	Thomas English Stephens *	unopposed		
Registered electors		2,345		
Liberal hold		Swing		

=== Castle Street ===
No. 6 Castle Street
Party	Candidate	Votes	%	±%
Conservative	James Marke Wood	unopposed		
Registered electors		2,021		
Conservative hold		Swing		

=== Everton ===
No. 1 Everton
Party	Candidate	Votes	%	±%
Conservative	Edward Whitley MP *	Unopposed	N/A	N/A
Registered electors		21,491		
Conservative hold				

=== Exchange ===
No. 5 Exchange
Party	Candidate	Votes	%	±%
Liberal	Robert Durning Holt *	862	79%	
Home Rule	Edward Purcell	236	21%	
Majority		626	58%	
Registered electors		2,080		
Turnout		1,098	53%	
Rejected ballots		10		
Liberal hold		Swing		

=== Great George ===
No. 9 Great George
Party	Candidate	Votes	%	±%
Liberal	John Frederick Rogers	unopposed		
Registered electors		1,176		
Liberal hold		Swing		

=== Lime Street ===
No. 12 Lime Street
Party	Candidate	Votes	%	±%
Conservative	Thomas Patrick Holden	unopposed		
Registered electors		1,575		
Conservative gain from		Swing		

=== North Toxteth ===
No. 16 North Toxteth
Party	Candidate	Votes	%	±%
Conservative	John Hughes *	unopposed		
Registered electors		9,131		
Conservative hold		Swing		

=== Pitt Street ===
No. 8 Pitt Street
Party	Candidate	Votes	%	±%
Liberal	Henry Charles Hawley *	unopposed		
Registered electors		798		
Liberal hold		Swing		

=== Rodney Street ===
No. 10 Rodney Street
Party	Candidate	Votes	%	±%
Liberal	John McDiarmid	unopposed		
Registered electors		2,332		
Liberal gain from Conservative		Swing		

=== St. Anne Street ===
No. 13 St. Anne Street
Party	Candidate	Votes	%	±%
Conservative	Dr. William Cross *	unopposed		
Registered electors		2,364		
Conservative hold		Swing		

=== St. Paul's ===
No. 4 St. Paul's
Party	Candidate	Votes	%	±%
Liberal	John Thomas Warrington	560	77%	
Home Rule	Patrick Murphy	169	23%	
Majority		391	54%	N/A
Registered electors		1,542		
Turnout		729		
Rejected ballots		3		
Liberal gain from Conservative		Swing		

=== St. Peter's ===
No. 7 St. Peter's
Party	Candidate	Votes	%	±%
Liberal	Edmund Knowles Muspratt *	Unopposed	N/A	N/A
Registered electors		1,481		
Liberal hold				

=== Scotland ===
No. 2 Scotland
Party	Candidate	Votes	%	±%
Liberal	Joseph Simpson	1,930	52%	
Home Rule	Patrick Byrne *	1,805	48%	
Majority		125	4%	N/A
Registered electors		7,150		
Turnout		3,735	52%	
Rejected ballots		33		
Liberal gain from Home Rule		Swing		

=== South Toxteth ===
No. 15 South Toxteth
Party	Candidate	Votes	%	±%
Conservative	Thomas Bland Royden *	Unopposed	N/A	N/A
Registered electors		5,482		
Conservative hold				

=== Vauxhall ===
No. 3 Vauxhall
Party	Candidate	Votes	%	±%
Liberal	John Yates *	620	69%	
Irish Nationalist	John Denvir	279	31%	
Majority		341	38%	
Registered electors		1,692		
Turnout		341	53%	
Rejected ballots		5		
Liberal hold		Swing		

=== West Derby ===
No. 14 West Derby
Party	Candidate	Votes	%	±%
Conservative	James Poole	unopposed		
Registered electors		9,913		
Conservative hold		Swing		

== Aldermanic Elections ==
At the meeting of the council on 9 November 1883, the terms of office of eight alderman expired.

The following eight were elected as Aldermen by the council (Aldermen and Councillors) on 9 November 1883 for a term of six years.

* - re-elected aldermen.

Party	Alderman
Conservative	Andrew Boyd *
Conservative	Arthur Bower Forwood *
Conservative	Sir William Bower Forwood *
Conservative	Alexander Garnett
Conservative	Edward Grindley
Conservative	John Nicol *
Conservative	John Pearson *
Conservative	Edward Samuelson *

== By-elections ==
=== No. 6, Castle Street, 13 November 1883 ===
Caused by the resignation of Councillor Samuel Smith MP (Liberal, Castle Street, elected 1 November 1882) which was reported to the council on 5 December 1883.

No. 6 Castle Street
Party	Candidate	Votes	%	±%
	William Crossfield	unopposed		
Registered electors				
		Swing		

=== No. 12, Lime Street, 23 November 1883 ===
Caused by the election of Councillor Edward Grindley (Conservative, Lime Street, elected 1 November 1881) as an aldermen by the council (councillors and aldermen) on 9 November 1883.

No. 12 Lime Street
Party	Candidate	Votes	%	±%
Conservative	Thomas William Oakshott	674	54%	
Liberal	John Henderson	581	46%	
Majority		93	8%	
Registered electors		1,575		
Turnout		1,255	80%	
Rejected ballots		12		
Conservative hold		Swing		

=== Aldermanic By-Election, 9 January 1884 ===
Caused by the death of Alderman Andrew Boyd on 20 December 1883. Subsequently, former Councillor David Radcliffe (Conservative, Rodney Street, elected 1 November 1880), of Formby Hall Ainsdale, was elected as an alderman by the council (Councillors and Aldermen) on 9 January 1884.

=== No. 14, West Derby, 26 April 1884 ===
Caused by the death of Councillor Samuel Leigh Gregson (Conservative, West Derby, elected 1 November 1882) on 3 April 1884.

No. 14 West Derby
Party	Candidate	Votes	%	±%
Conservative	Edward Hatton Cookson	3,589	54%	
Liberal	George McFerran	3,015	46%	
Majority		574	8%	
Registered electors		9,913		
Turnout		6,604	67%	
Conservative hold		Swing		

=== No. 9, Great George, 21 May 1884 ===
Caused by the resignation of Councillor John Frederick Rogers (Party?, Great George, elected 1 November 1883).

No. 9 Great George
Party	Candidate	Votes	%	±%
Liberal	Edward Paull	Unopposed	N/A	N/A
Registered electors		1,176		
Liberal hold				

=== No. 9, Great George, 2 September 1884 ===
Caused by the death of Councillor Benjamin Lewis (Liberal, Great George, elected 1 November 1882) on 12 August 1884.

No. 9 Great George
Party	Candidate	Votes	%	±%
Liberal	James Ruddin	475	54%	
	John Ellis	397	46%	
Majority		78		
Registered electors		1,176		
Turnout		872	74%	
Liberal hold		Swing		

== See also ==
- Liverpool City Council
- Liverpool Town Council elections 1835 - 1879
- Liverpool City Council elections 1880–present
- Mayors and Lord Mayors of Liverpool 1207 to present
- History of local government in England
