= 1846 Liverpool Town Council election =

English local election

- 1 November 1846

16 seats were up for election: one seat for each of the 16 wards 33 (incl. Aldermen) seats needed for a majority

Elections to Liverpool Town Council were held on Monday 2 November 1846. One third of the council seats were up for election, the term of office of each councillor being three years.

Three of the sixteen wards were uncontested. In the uncontested elections, votes were still cast, although in very small numbers.

After the election, the composition of the council was:

Party	Councillors	±	Aldermen	Total
Conservative	36	0	16	52
Reformers	12	0	0	12

== Election result ==
Liverpool local election result 1846
Party	Seats	Gains	Losses	Net gain/loss	Seats %	Votes %	Votes	+/−
Conservative	11	3	3	0	69%	52%	2,654	
Whig	5	3	3	0	31%	48%	2,443	

== Ward results ==
* - Retiring Councillor seeking re-election

=== Abercromby ===
No. 11 Abercromby
Party	Candidate	Votes	%	±%
Conservative	Thomas Kaye *	268	52%	
Whig	Thomas Todd	243	48%	
Majority		25	4%	
Registered electors		719		
Turnout		511	71%	
Conservative hold		Swing		

=== Castle Street ===
No. 6 Castle Street
Party	Candidate	Votes	%	±%
Whig	James Aikin *	2	100%	
Registered electors				
Turnout		2		
Whig hold		Swing		

=== Everton ===
No. 1 Everton
Party	Candidate	Votes	%	±%
Conservative	William Atherton *	301	52%	
Whig	William Walthew	278	48%	
Majority		23	4%	
Registered electors		899		
Turnout		579	64%	
Conservative hold		Swing		

=== Exchange ===
No. 5 Exchange
Party	Candidate	Votes	%	±%
Conservative	James Tyrer *	187	59%	
Whig	James Mellor	129	41%	
Majority		58	18%	
Registered electors		610		
Turnout		316		
Conservative hold		Swing		

=== Great George ===
No. 9 Great George
Party	Candidate	Votes	%	±%
Conservative	Joseph Cooper	168	62%	
Whig	William Purser Freme	103	38%	
Majority		65	24%	
Registered electors		459		
Turnout		271	59%	
Conservative hold		Swing		

=== Lime Street ===
No. 12 Lime Street
Party	Candidate	Votes	%	±%
Whig	Henry Danson	280	52%	
Conservative	Charles Saunders	254	48%	
Majority		26	4%	N/A
Registered electors		746		
Turnout		534	72%	
Whig gain from Conservative		Swing		

=== North Toxteth ===
No. 16 North Toxteth
Party	Candidate	Votes	%	±%
Whig	Robert Benn	241	64%	
Conservative	John Sheppard	135	36%	
Majority		105	28%	N/A
Registered electors		814		
Turnout		376	46%	
Whig gain from Conservative		Swing		

=== Pitt Street ===
No. 8 Pitt Street
Party	Candidate	Votes	%	±%
Conservative	Thomas Toulmin *	199	55%	
Whig	George Holt	163	45%	
Majority		36	10%	
Registered electors		523		
Turnout		362	69%	
Conservative hold		Swing		

=== Rodney Street ===
No. 10 Rodney Street
Party	Candidate	Votes	%	±%
Conservative	Samuel Holme	306	57%	
Whig	Thomas Booth	229	43%	
Majority		77	14%	
Registered electors		821		
Turnout		535	65%	
Conservative hold		Swing		

=== St. Anne Street ===
No. 13 St. Anne Street
Party	Candidate	Votes	%	±%
Conservative	William Bennett	202	56%	
Whig	Joseph Hornby *	159	44%	
Majority		43	12%	N/A
Registered electors		473		
Turnout		361	76%	
Conservative gain from Whig		Swing		

=== St. Paul's ===
No. 4 St. Paul's
Party	Candidate	Votes	%	±%
Whig	James Stitt	145	57%	
Conservative	John Briscoe	108	43%	
Majority		37	14%	
Registered electors		472		
Turnout		253	54%	
Whig hold		Swing		

=== St. Peter's ===
No. 7 St. Peter's
Party	Candidate	Votes	%	±%
Conservative	John Abraham Tinne *	3	100%	
Registered electors				
Conservative hold				

=== Scotland ===
No. 2 Scotland
Party	Candidate	Votes	%	±%
Conservative	James Holme	229	51%	
Whig	William Thornhill *	221	49%	
Majority		8	2%	N/A
Registered electors				
Turnout		450		
Conservative gain from Whig		Swing		

=== South Toxteth ===
No. 15 South Toxteth
Party	Candidate	Votes	%	±%
Whig	William Watson	171	51%	
Conservative	Thomas Swanbrook Glazebrook *	162	49%	
Majority		9	2%	N/A
Registered electors				
Turnout		333		
Whig gain from Conservative		Swing		

=== Vauxhall ===
No. 3 Vauxhall
Party	Candidate	Votes	%	±%
Conservative	John Grant Morris	118	60%	
Whig	Thomas Chalmer	79	40%	
Majority		39	20%	N/A
Registered electors		296		
Turnout		197	67%	
Conservative gain from Whig		Swing		

=== West Derby ===
No. 14 West Derby
Party	Candidate	Votes	%	±%
Conservative	George Hall Lawrence	14	100%	
Registered electors				
Conservative hold				
