= 1888 Liverpool City Council election =

Liverpool Town Council elections 1888

- November 1, 1888

16 seats were up for election (one third): one seat for each of the 16 wards 33 (incl. Aldermen) seats needed for a majority

Elections to Liverpool City Council were held on Saturday 1 November 1888. One third of the council seats were up for election, the term of office of each councillor being three years.

Eight of the sixteen seats were contested.

After the election, the composition of the council was:

Party	Councillors	±	Aldermen	Total
Conservative	??	+1	16	??
Liberal	??	-1	0	??
Irish Home Rule	4	-2	0	4
Irish Nationalists	2	+2	0	2

== Election result ==
Liverpool local election result 1888
Party	Seats	Gains	Losses	Net gain/loss	Seats %	Votes %	Votes	+/−
Conservative	10	1	0	+1	63%	52%	5,098	
Liberal	4	0	1	-1	25%	48%	4,779	
Irish Nationalist	2				12.5%			

== Ward results ==
* - Retiring Councillor seeking re-election

=== Abercromby ===
No. 11 Abercromby
Party	Candidate	Votes	%	±%
Conservative	Dr. Nicholas Kenrick Marsh *	854	56%	
Liberal	Henry Cartwright Gillmore	658	44%	
Majority		196	12%	
Registered electors		2,226		
Turnout		1,512	68%	
Conservative hold		Swing		

=== Castle Street ===
No. 6 Castle Street
Party	Candidate	Votes	%	±%
Conservative	William Bartlett	unopposed		
Registered electors				
Conservative hold		Swing		

=== Everton ===
No. 1 Everton
Party	Candidate	Votes	%	±%
Conservative	John Houlding *	Unopposed	N/A	N/A
Registered electors				
Conservative hold				

=== Exchange ===
No. 5 Exchange
Party	Candidate	Votes	%	±%
Conservative	Ralph Watts Leyland	754	51%	
Liberal	Edwin Morris	737	49%	
Majority		37	2%	
Registered electors		2,061		
Turnout		1,491	72%	
Conservative hold		Swing		

=== Great George ===
No. 9 Great George
Party	Candidate	Votes	%	±%
Liberal	James Ruddin *	389	52%	
Conservative	Samuel King	352	48%	
Majority		37	4%	
Registered electors		1,086		
Turnout		741	68%	
Liberal hold		Swing		

=== Lime Street ===
No. 12 Lime Street
Party	Candidate	Votes	%	±%
Liberal	Sir James Allanson Picton *	Unopposed	N/A	N/A
Registered electors				
Liberal hold				

=== North Toxteth ===
No. 16 North Toxteth
Party	Candidate	Votes	%	±%
Conservative	Thomas Hughes *	unopposed		
Registered electors				
Conservative hold		Swing		

=== Pitt Street ===
No. 8 Pitt Street
Party	Candidate	Votes	%	±%
Liberal	Jeremiah Miles *	unopposed		
Registered electors				
Liberal hold		Swing		

=== Rodney Street ===
No. 10 Rodney Street
Party	Candidate	Votes	%	±%
Conservative	Hugh McCubbin	625	50.4%	
Liberal	Philip Henry Rathbone *	615	49.6%	
Majority		10	0.8%	N/A
Registered electors		2,288		
Turnout		1,240	54%	
Conservative gain from Liberal		Swing		

=== St. Anne Street ===
No. 13 St. Anne Street
Party	Candidate	Votes	%	±%
Liberal	Samuel McMillin	940	58%	
Conservative	Joseph Woodcock *	676	42%	
Majority		264	16%	N/A
Registered electors		2,153		
Turnout		1,616	75%	
Liberal gain from Conservative		Swing		

=== St. Paul's ===
No. 4 St. Paul's
Party	Candidate	Votes	%	±%
Liberal	John Davies *	unopposed		
Registered electors				
Liberal hold		Swing		

=== St. Peter's ===
No. 7 St. Peter's
Party	Candidate	Votes	%	±%
Conservative	Arthur Hill Holme *	unopposed		
Registered electors				
Conservative hold		Swing		

=== Scotland ===
No. 2 Scotland
Party	Candidate	Votes	%	±%
Irish Nationalist	Alexander Murray Bligh *	unopposed		
Registered electors				
Irish Nationalist gain from Home Rule		Swing		

=== South Toxteth ===
No. 15 South Toxteth
Party	Candidate	Votes	%	±%
Conservative	William Radcliffe *	1,837	56%	
Liberal	John Thomas	1,440	44%	
Majority		397	12%	
Registered electors		5,323		
Turnout		3,277	62%	
Conservative hold		Swing		

=== Vauxhall ===
No. 3 Vauxhall
Party	Candidate	Votes	%	±%
Irish Nationalist	Dr. Andrew Commins MP *	Unopposed	N/A	N/A
Registered electors				
Irish Nationalist gain from Home Rule		Swing		

=== West Derby ===
No. 14 West Derby
Party	Candidate	Votes	%	±%
Conservative	Edward Hatton Cookson *	unopposed		
Registered electors				
Conservative hold		Swing		

== By-elections ==
=== No. 9 Great George, 14 May 1889 ===
Caused by the resignation of Councillor Thomas Bird Hall (Conservative, Great George, elected 1 November 1886) reported to the Council on 1 May 1889 .

No. 9 Great George
Party	Candidate	Votes	%	±%
Liberal	William Whiteley *	392	56%	
Conservative	Samuel King	308	44%	
Majority		84	12%	
Registered electors		1,086		
Turnout		700	64%	
Liberal hold		Swing		

=== No. 12, Lime Street, 8 August 1889 ===
Caused by the death of Councillor Sir James Allanson Picton (Liberal, Lime Street, elected 1 November 1888) on 15 July 1889 .

No. 12 Lime Street
Party	Candidate	Votes	%	±%
Conservative	James Henderson	472	61%	
	John Bond	299	39%	
Majority		173		
Registered electors				
Turnout		771		
Conservative gain from Liberal		Swing		

.

=== No. 2, Scotland ===
Caused by the death of Councillor Patrick Edmund O'Hare (Irish Home Rule, Scotland, elected 29 December 1887) on 3 October 1889 .

Councillor O'Hare's term of office was due to expire on 1 November 1889.

No. 2 Scotland
Party	Candidate	Votes	%	±%
Majority				
Registered electors				
Turnout				
	gain from	Swing		

== See also ==
- Liverpool City Council
- Liverpool Town Council elections 1835 - 1879
- Liverpool City Council elections 1880–present
- Mayors and Lord Mayors of Liverpool 1207 to present
- History of local government in England
