= 1880 Liverpool City Council election =

Liverpool City Council elections 1880

- November 1, 1880

16 seats were up for election: one seat for each of the 16 wards 33 (incl. Aldermen) seats needed for a majority

Elections to Liverpool City Council were held on Monday 1 November 1880. One third of the council seats were up for election, the term of office of each councillor being three years.

After the election, the composition of the council was:

Party	Councillors	±	Aldermen	Total
Conservative	??	??	??	??
Liberal	??	??	??	??
Irish Home Rule	5	0	0	5

== Election result ==
Liverpool local election result 1880
Party	Seats	Gains	Losses	Net gain/loss	Seats %	Votes %	Votes	+/−
Conservative	9	0	1	-1	56%	53%	25,821	
Liberal	6	1	0	+1	37.5%	41%	20,040	
Home Rule	1	0	0	0	6%	6.1%	2,972	

== Ward results ==
* - Retiring Councillor seeking re-election

=== Abercromby ===
No. 11 Abercromby
Party	Candidate	Votes	%	±%
Liberal	Thomas English Stephens	1,041	52%	
Conservative	Dr. George Gill *	960	48%	
Majority		81	4%	N/A
Registered electors		2,478		
Turnout		2,001	81%	
Liberal gain from Conservative		Swing		

=== Castle Street ===
No. 6 Castle Street
Party	Candidate	Votes	%	±%
Conservative	Alexander Garnett *	782	51%	
Liberal	George Holt	756	49%	
Majority		26	2%	
Registered electors		1,945		
Turnout		1,538		
Conservative hold		Swing		

=== Everton ===
No. 1 Everton
Party	Candidate	Votes	%	±%
Conservative	Edward Whitley MP *	7,972	61%	
Liberal	Owen Williams	5,166	39%	
Majority		2,806	22%	
Registered electors		29,110		
Turnout		13,138	45%	
Conservative hold		Swing		

=== Exchange ===
No. 5 Exchange
Party	Candidate	Votes	%	±%
Liberal	Robert Durning Holt *	905	57%	
Conservative	Joseph Bond Morgan	693	43%	
Majority		212	14%	
Registered electors		2,223		
Turnout		1,598	72%	
Liberal hold		Swing		

=== Great George ===
No. 9 Great George
Party	Candidate	Votes	%	±%
Liberal	John Hays Wilson *	523	56%	
Conservative	Walter Pierce	415	44%	
Majority		108	12%	
Registered electors		1,210		
Turnout		938	78%	
Liberal hold		Swing		

=== Lime Street ===
No. 12 Lime Street
Party	Candidate	Votes	%	±%
Conservative	James Alexander Forrest *	713	52%	
Liberal	John Henderson	658	48%	
Majority		55	4%	
Registered electors		1,705		
Turnout		1,371	80%	
Conservative hold		Swing		

=== North Toxteth ===
No. 16 North Toxteth
Party	Candidate	Votes	%	±%
Conservative	John Hughes	2,934	55%	
Liberal	John Thomas Warrington	2,400	45%	
Majority		534	10%	
Registered electors		7,844		
Turnout		5,334	68%	
Conservative hold		Swing		

=== Pitt Street ===
No. 8 Pitt Street
Party	Candidate	Votes	%	±%
Liberal	Henry Charles Hawley *	393	57%	
Conservative	Henry Jennings	294	43%	
Majority		99	14%	
Registered electors		848		
Turnout		687	81%	
Liberal hold		Swing		

=== Rodney Street ===
No. 10 Rodney Street
Party	Candidate	Votes	%	±%
Conservative	David Radcliffe *	955	50%	
Liberal	Edward Richard Russell	938	50%	
Majority		17	0%	
Registered electors		2,499		
Turnout		1,893	76%	
Conservative hold		Swing		

=== St. Anne Street ===
No. 13 St. Anne Street
Party	Candidate	Votes	%	±%
Conservative	Dr. William Cross *	1,070	51%	
Liberal	Thomas Shepherd Little	1,018	49%	
Majority		52	2%	
Registered electors		2,571		
Turnout		2,088	81%	
Conservative hold		Swing		

=== St. Paul's ===
No. 4 St. Paul's
Party	Candidate	Votes	%	±%
Conservative	George Curzon Dobell	708	50%	
Liberal	William Williams	703	50%	
Majority		5	0%	
Registered electors		1,767		
Turnout		1,411	80%	
Conservative hold		Swing		

=== St. Peter's ===
No. 7 St. Peter's
Party	Candidate	Votes	%	±%
Liberal	Edmund Knowles Muspratt *	667	54%	
Conservative	Joseph Boumphrey	560	46%	
Majority		107	8%	
Registered electors		1,632		
Turnout		1,227	75%	
Liberal hold		Swing		

=== Scotland ===
No. 2 Scotland
Party	Candidate	Votes	%	±%
Home Rule	Patrick de Lacy Garton *	2,972	59%	
Conservative	Joshua Siddeley	2,096	41%	
Majority		876	18%	N/A
Registered electors		7,828		
Turnout		5,068	65%	
Home Rule gain from Home Rule League and Liberal Party (UK)				

=== South Toxteth ===
No. 15 South Toxteth
Party	Candidate	Votes	%	±%
Conservative	Thomas Bland Royden *	1,937	57%	
Liberal	John Evans	1,486	43%	
Majority		451	14%	
Registered electors		5,004		
Turnout		3,423	68%	
Conservative hold		Swing		

=== Vauxhall ===
No. 3 Vauxhall
Party	Candidate	Votes	%	±%
Liberal	John Yates *	875	75%	
Conservative	David Quaile	299	25%	
Majority		576	50%	
Registered electors		1,732		
Turnout		1,174	68%	
Liberal hold		Swing		

=== West Derby ===
No. 14 West Derby
Party	Candidate	Votes	%	±%
Conservative	William Samuel Graves *	3,433	58%	
Liberal	Charles Frederick Bosomworth	2,511	42%	
Majority		922	16%	
Registered electors		8,821		
Turnout		5,944	67%	
Conservative hold		Swing		

== Aldermanic Elections ==
At the meeting of the council on 9 November 1880, the terms of office of eight alderman expired. The following eight were elected as Aldermen by the council (Aldermen and Councillors) on 9 November 1880 for a term of six years.

* - re-elected aldermen.

Party	Alderman
Conservative	William Chambres *
Conservative	Henry Jennings
Conservative	Joseph Gibbons Livingston *
Conservative	David MacIver MP *
Conservative	Hugh Hathorn Nicholson *
Conservative	Thomas Rigby *
Conservative	Thomas Richard Shallcross
Conservative	Sir Andrew Barclay Walker *

== By-elections ==
=== No. 6, Castle Street, 21 March 1881 ===
Caused by the death of Councillor William Crossfield (Liberal, Castle Street, elected 1 November 1878), which was reported to the Council meeting on 2 March 1881.

No. 6 Castle Street
Party	Candidate	Votes	%	±%
Conservative	Joseph Bond Morgan	727	52%	
Liberal	William Crosfield	679	48%	
Majority		48	4%	N/A
Registered electors		1,945		
Turnout		1,406	72%	
Conservative gain from Liberal		Swing		

=== No. 4, St. Paul's, 4 April 1881 ===
Caused by the result of the election for the St. Paul's ward on 1 November 1879 being declared void under the Corrupt Practices (Municipal Elections) Act, 1872. Andrew Patterson, the Agent for George Curzon Dobell (Conservative), was found to have given 5 shillings to Catherine Tallon in order to induce her to vote for George Curzon Dobell.

No. 4 St. Paul's
Party	Candidate	Votes	%	±%
Conservative	Robert Wheeler Preston	635	50.4%	
Liberal	John Thomas Warrington	626	49.6%	
Majority		9	0.8%	
Registered electors		1,767		
Turnout		1,261	71%	
Conservative hold		Swing		

=== No. 12, Lime Street, 4 April 1881 ===
Caused by the result of the election for the Lime Street ward on 1 November 1879 being declared void under the Corrupt Practices (Municipal Elections) Act, 1872. Edward Dobson, the Agent for James Alexander Forrest (Conservative), was found to have given a pair of gloves to Martha Wilson in order to induce her to vote for James Alexander Forrest.

No. 12 Lime Street
Party	Candidate	Votes	%	±%
	John Henstock	713	52%	
	Mr. Turner	513	45%	
Majority		113		
Registered electors		1,705		
Turnout		1,139	67%	
		Swing		

=== No. 6, Castle Street, 11 May 1881 ===
No. 6 Castle Street
Party	Candidate	Votes	%	±%
Conservative	James Marke Wood	unopposed		
Registered electors		1,945		
Conservative hold		Swing		

=== No. 10, Rodney Street, 11 May 1881 ===
No. 10 Rodney Street
Party	Candidate	Votes	%	±%
Liberal	John McDiarmid	unopposed		
Registered electors		2,499		
Liberal gain from Conservative		Swing		

=== No. 9, Great George, 26 May 1881 ===
No. 9 Great George
Party	Candidate	Votes	%	±%
	John Frederick Rogers	unopposed		
Registered electors		1,210		
		Swing		

=== No. 16, North Toxteth, 17 June 1881 ===
Caused by the resignation of Councillor Lieutenant-Colonel Richard Fell Steble (Conservative, North Toxteth, elected 1 November 1878).

No. 16 North Toxteth
Party	Candidate	Votes	%	±%
Conservative	Robert Hamilton	unopposed		
Registered electors		7,844		
Conservative hold		Swing		

=== No. 4, St. Paul's, 4 July 1881 ===
No. 4 St. Paul's
Party	Candidate	Votes	%	±%
	John William McWean	641	52%	
	Mr. Preston	585	48%	
Majority		56		
Registered electors		1,767		
Turnout		1,226	69%	
		Swing		

== See also ==
- Liverpool City Council
- Liverpool Town Council elections 1835 - 1879
- Liverpool City Council elections 1880–present
- Mayors and Lord Mayors of Liverpool 1207 to present
- History of local government in England
