= West Derby (ward) =

Former ward of Liverpool City Council (UK)

Coordinates: 53.4338°N 2.9074°W

- West Derby ward (2004) within Liverpool
- Area: 3.557 km^{2} (1.373 sq mi)
- Population: 13,837 (2021 census)
  - Density: 3,890/km^{2} (10,100/sq mi)
- Metropolitan borough: City of Liverpool
- Metropolitan county: Merseyside
- Region: North West
- Country: England
- Sovereign state: United Kingdom
- UK Parliament: Liverpool West Derby

West Derby ward was an electoral district of Liverpool City Council from 1835 to 1953 and again from 2004 to 2023.

== Background ==
1835 ward boundaries

The ward was created in 1835 as an original ward of Liverpool Town Council under the Municipal Corporations Act 1835. The ward was dissolved following the boundary changes ahead of the 1953 Liverpool City Council election.

=== 2004 boundaries ===
The ward was re-created for the 2004 Liverpool City Council election. Where it replaced most of the pre-2004 Croxteth ward, incorporating small parts of Gilmoss and Broadgreen wards.

The ward was centred on West Derby village. Its boundaries followed Croxteth Hall Lane, Deysbrook Lane, Melwood Drive, Crown Road, Deysbrook Lane, Leyfield Road, Honey's Green Lane, Eaton Road, Mill Lane, Queens Drive, Muirhead Avenue, Dwerryhouse Lane, the southern boundary of De La Salle School, and Elwick Drive. It contained Croxteth Park, Blackmoor Park Junior school, St. Paul's primary school, St. Mary's primary school and Holly Lodge secondary school.

The population of the ward at the 2021 census was 13,837.

The ward was again dissolved in 2023 where it was split into the new Sandfield Park, West Derby Deysbrook, West Derby Leyfield, and West Derby Muirhead wards.

== Councillors ==
Election	Councillor	Councillor	Councillor
1835	Joseph Sanders (Con)	George Holt (Reformer)	John Shaw Leigh (Con)
1836	John Smith (Con)	George Holt (Reformer)	John Shaw Leigh (Con)
1837	John Smith (Con)	George Hall Lawrence (Con)	John Shaw Leigh (Con)
1838	John Smith (Con)	George Hall Lawrence (Con)	John Shaw Leigh (Con)
1839	John Smith (Con)	George Hall Lawrence (Con)	John Shaw Leigh (Con)
1840	John Smith (Con)	George Hall Lawrence (Con)	John Shaw Leigh (Con)
1841	John Smith (Con)	George Hall Lawrence (Con)	John Shaw Leigh (Con)
1842	James Plumpton (Con)	George Hall Lawrence (Con)	John Shaw Leigh (Con)
1843	James Plumpton (Con)	George Hall Lawrence (Con)	John Shaw Leigh (Con)
1844	James Plumpton (Con)	George Hall Lawrence (Con)	John Shaw Leigh (Con)
1845	James Plumpton (Con)	George Hall Lawrence (Con)	John Shaw Leigh (Con)
1846	James Plumpton (Con)	George Hall Lawrence (Con)	John Shaw Leigh (Con)
1847	James Plumpton (Con)	George Hall Lawrence (Con)	Josias Booker (Con)
1848	Richard Mitchell Beckwith (Whig)	George Hall Lawrence (Con)	Josias Booker (Con)
1849	Richard Mitchell Beckwith (Whig)	Arthur Henderson (Whig)	Josias Booker (Con)
1850	Richard Mitchell Beckwith (Whig)	Arthur Henderson (Whig)	James Marks Wood (Con)
1851	Richard Mitchell Beckwith (Con)	Arthur Henderson (Whig)	James Marks Wood (Con)
1852	Richard Mitchell Beckwith (Con)	Arthur Henderson (Con)	James Marks Wood (Con)
1853	Richard Mitchell Beckwith (Con)	Arthur Henderson (Con)	Francis Anderson Clint (Whig)
1854	Richard Mitchell Beckwith (Con)	Arthur Henderson (Con)	Francis Anderson Clint (Whig)
1855	Richard Mitchell Beckwith (Con)	John Aikin (Whig)	Francis Anderson Clint (Whig)
1856	Richard Mitchell Beckwith (Con)	John Aikin (Whig)	Francis Anderson Clint (Whig)
1857	Richard Mitchell Beckwith (Con)	John Aikin (Whig)	Francis Anderson Clint (Whig)
1858	Richard Mitchell Beckwith (Con)	John Aikin (Lib)	Francis Anderson Clint (Whig)
1859	Richard Mitchell Beckwith (Con)	John Aikin (Lib)	Francis Anderson Clint (Lib)
1860	Richard Mitchell Beckwith (Con)	John Aikin (Lib)	Francis Anderson Clint (Lib)
1861	Richard Mitchell Beckwith (Con)	Peter George Heyworth (Lib)	Francis Anderson Clint (Lib)
1862	Richard Mitchell Beckwith (Con)	Peter George Heyworth (Lib)	Francis Anderson Clint (Lib)
1863	John Birch Melladew (Con)	Peter George Heyworth (Lib)	Francis Anderson Clint (Lib)
1864	John Birch Melladew (Con)	Edward Samuelson (Con)	Francis Anderson Clint (Lib)
1865	John Birch Melladew (Con)	Edward Samuelson (Con)	Francis Anderson Clint (Lib)
1866	John Birch Melladew (Con)	Edward Samuelson (Con)	Francis Anderson Clint (Lib)
1867	John Birch Melladew (Con)	Edward Samuelson (Con)	Francis Anderson Clint (Lib)
1868	John Birch Melladew (Con)	Edward Samuelson (Con)	Francis Anderson Clint (Lib)
1869	John Birch Melladew (Con)	Edward Samuelson (Con)	Francis Anderson Clint (Lib)
1870	John Birch Melladew (Con)	Edward Samuelson (Con)	Francis Anderson Clint (Lib)
1871	John Birch Melladew (Con)	Edward Samuelson (Con)	Francis Anderson Clint (Lib)
1872	William Durning Holt (Lib)	Edward Samuelson (Con)	Francis Anderson Clint (Lib)
1873	William Durning Holt (Lib)	Edward Samuelson (Con)	Francis Anderson Clint (Lib)
1874	William Durning Holt (Lib)	Edward Samuelson (Con)	Francis Anderson Clint (Lib)
1875	William Durning Holt (Lib)	Edward Samuelson (Con)	William Samuel Graves (Con)
1876	William Durning Holt (Lib)	William Leyland (Con)	William Samuel Graves (Con)
1876	William Durning Holt (Lib)	John Nicol (Con)	William Samuel Graves (Con)
1877	William Durning Holt (Lib)	John Nichol (Con)	William Samuel Graves (Con)
1878	William John Lunt (Con)	John Nichol (Con)	William Samuel Graves (Con)
1879	William John Lunt (Con)	William Simpson (Ind)	William Samuel Graves (Con)
1880	William John Lunt (Con)	Samuel Leigh Gregson (Con)	William Samuel Graves (Con)
1881	William John Lunt (Con)	Samuel Leigh Gregson (Con)	William Samuel Graves (Con)
1882	William John Lunt (Con)	Samuel Leigh Gregson (Con)	William Samuel Graves (Con)
1883	William John Lunt (Con)	Samuel Leigh Gregson (Con)	James Poole (Con)
1884	William John Lunt (Con)	Edward Hatton Cookson (Con)	James Poole (Con)
1885	William John Lunt (Con)	Edward Hatton Cookson (Con)	James Poole (Con)
1886	William John Lunt (Con)	Edward Hatton Cookson (Con)	James Poole (Con)
1887	William John Lunt (Con)	Edward Hatton Cookson (Con)	James Poole (Con)
1888	William John Lunt (Con)	Edward Hatton Cookson (Con)	James Poole (Con)
1889	George Barrell Rodway (Con)	Edward Hatton Cookson (Con)	Ephraim Walker (Con)
1890	George Barrell Rodway (Con)	Edward Hatton Cookson (Con)	Ephraim Walker (Con)
1891	George Barrell Rodway (Con)	Edward Hatton Cookson (Con)	Ephraim Walker (Con)
1892	George Barrell Rodway (Con)	Edward Hatton Cookson (Con)	Ephraim Walker (Con)
1893	Thomas Clarke (Con)	Edward Hatton Cookson (Con)	Ephraim Walker (Con)
1894	Thomas Clarke (Con)	Edward Hatton Cookson (Con)	Ephraim Walker (Con)
WARD BOUNDARY CHANGE
1895	William Craigie Williams (Con)	Robert Edward Walkington Stephenson (Con)	James Lister (Con)
1896	William Craigie Williams (Con)	Robert Edward Walkington Stephenson (Con)	James Lister (Con)
1897	William Craigie Williams (Con)	Robert Edward Walkington Stephenson (Con)	James Lister (Con)
1898	William Craigie Williams (Con)	Robert Edward Walkington Stephenson (Con)	James Lister (Con)
1899	Thomas Utley (Lib)	Robert Edward Walkington Stephenson (Con)	James Lister (Con)
1900	Thomas Utley (Lib)	William Ramsden (Lib)	James Lister (Con)
1901	Thomas Utley (Lib)	William Ramsden (Lib)	James Lister (Con)
1902	Thomas Utley (Lib)	William Ramsden (Lib)	James Lister (Con)
1903	Samuel Skelton (Lib)	Thomas Shaw (Lib)	Robert Edward Walkington Stephenson (Con)
1904	Samuel Skelton (Lib)	Thomas Shaw (Lib)	Robert Edward Walkington Stephenson (Con)
1905	Samuel Skelton (Lib)	Thomas Shaw (Lib)	Robert Edward Walkington Stephenson (Con)
1906	Samuel Skelton (Lib)	William Henry Parkinson (Con)	Robert Edward Walkington Stephenson (Con)
1907	Samuel Skelton (Lib)	William Henry Parkinson (Con)	Robert Edward Walkington Stephenson (Con)
1908	William James Bailes (Con)	William Henry Parkinson (Con)	Robert Edward Walkington Stephenson (Con)
1909	William James Bailes (Con)	William Henry Parkinson (Con)	Robert Edward Walkington Stephenson (Con)
1910	William James Bailes (Con)	William Henry Parkinson (Con)	Robert Edward Walkington Stephenson (Con)
1911	William James Bailes (Con)	William Henry Parkinson (Con)	Thomas Ithell (Con)
1912	William James Bailes (Con)	William Henry Parkinson (Con)	Thomas Ithell (Con)
1913	William James Bailes (Con)	William Henry Parkinson (Con)	Edward Henry Cooke (Con)
1914	William James Bailes (Con)	William Henry Parkinson (Con)	Edward Henry Cooke (Con)
1918	William James Bailes (Con)	John Ellis (Con)	Edward Henry Cooke (Con)
1919	William James Bailes (Con)	Walter Percy Helm (Con)	Edward Henry Cooke (Con)
1920	William James Bailes (Con)	Walter Percy Helm (Con)	Frederick William Riley (Con)
1921	William James Bailes (Con)	Walter Percy Helm (Con)	Frederick William Riley (Con)
1922	William John Lunt Cross (Con)	Robert Duncan French (Con)	Frederick William Riley (Con)
1923	William John Lunt Cross (Con)	Robert Duncan French (Con)	Frederick William Riley (Con)
1924	John Hickman Dovener (Con)	Robert Duncan French (Con)	Frederick William Riley (Con)
1925	John Hickman Dovener (Con)	Robert Duncan French (Con)	Frederick William Riley (Con)
1926	John Hickman Dovener (Con)	Robert Duncan French (Con)	? (?)
1926	John Hickman Dovener (Con)	Robert Duncan French (Con)	William Henry Young (Con)
1927	John Hickman Dovener (Con)	Robert Duncan French (Con)	Frederick William Riley (Con)
1928	John Hickman Dovener (Con)	Robert Duncan French (Con)	Frederick William Riley (Con)
1929	John Reginald Dovener (Con)	Robert Duncan French (Con)	Albert Morrow (Con)
1930	Ernest Ash Cookson (Con)	Robert Duncan French (Con)	Albert Morrow (Con)
1931	Ernest Ash Cookson (Con)	Robert Duncan French (Con)	Albert Morrow (Con)
1932	Ernest Ash Cookson (Con)	Robert Duncan French (Con)	Albert Morrow (Con)
1933	Ernest Ash Cookson (Con)	Robert Duncan French (Con)	Albert Morrow (Con)
1934	Ernest Ash Cookson (Con)	Robert Duncan French (Con)	Albert Morrow (Con)
1935	Ernest Ash Cookson (Con)	Robert Duncan French (Con)	Albert Morrow (Con)
1936	Ernest Ash Cookson (Con)	Robert Duncan French (Con)	Albert Morrow (Con)
1937	Ernest Ash Cookson (Con)	Robert Duncan French (Con)	Albert Morrow (Con)
1938	Ernest Ash Cookson (Con)	Charles William Wingrove (Con)	Albert Morrow (Con)
1943	Robert Beattie (Con)	Charles William Wingrove (Con)	Albert Morrow (Con)
1945	Robert Beattie (Con)	Charles William Wingrove (Con)	Hedley Williams (Con)
1946	Robert Beattie (Con)	Charles William Wingrove (Con)	Hedley Williams (Con)
1947	Robert Beattie (Con)	Charles William Wingrove (Con)	Hedley Williams (Con)
1949	Robert Beattie (Con)	Charles William Wingrove (Con)	Hedley Williams (Con)
1950	Robert Beattie (Con)	Alec James Garnock-Jones (Con)	Hedley Williams (Con)
1951	Robert Beattie (Con)	Alec James Garnock-Jones (Con)	Hedley Williams (Con)
1952	John Gwilym Hughes (Con)	Alec James Garnock-Jones (Con)	Hedley Williams (Con)
1953-2003 WARD DISESTABLISHED
2004	Stuart Monkcom (LD)	Norman Mills (LD)	Ann Hines (LD)
2006	Stuart Monkcom (LD)	Norman Mills (LD)	Ann Hines (LD)
2007	Stuart Monkcom (LD)	Norman Mills (LD)	Ann Hines (LD)
2008	Stuart Monkcom (LD)	Norman Mills (LD)	Graham Hulme (LD)
2010	Pamela Thomas (Lab)	Norman Mills (LD)	Graham Hulme (LD)
2011	Pamela Thomas (Lab)	Daniel Barrington (Lab)	Graham Hulme (LD)
2012	Pamela Thomas (Lab)	Daniel Barrington (Lab)	Lana Orr (Lab)
2014	Pamela Thomas (Lab)	Daniel Barrington (Lab)	Lana Orr (Lab)
2015	Pamela Thomas (Lab)	Daniel Barrington (Lab)	Lana Orr (Lab)
2016	Pamela Thomas (Lab)	Daniel Barrington (Lab)	Lana Orr (Lab)
2018	Pamela Thomas (Lab)	Daniel Barrington (Lab)	Lana Orr (Lab)
2019	Pamela Thomas (Lab)	Daniel Barrington (Lab)	Lana Orr (Lab)
2021	Pamela Thomas (Lab)	Daniel Barrington (Lab)	Lila Bennett (Lab)

indicates seat up for re-election after boundary changes.

indicates seat up for re-election.

indicates change in affiliation.

indicates seat up for re-election after casual vacancy.

== Election results ==
=== Elections of the 2020s ===
6 May 2021
Party	Candidate	Votes	%	±%
Labour	Lila Bennett	1,662	47.62	▼20.55
Liberal	Ann Hines	776	22.23	▲14.17
Liberal Democrats	Paul John Twigger Parr	463	13.27	▲4.41
Green	Elke Weissmann	303	8.68	▲0.42
Conservative	Joshua Murphy	286	8.19	▲1.54
Majority		886	25.39	▼33.92
Turnout		3,560	32.39	▲5.05
Registered electors		10,990		
Rejected ballots		70	1.97	▲0.87
Labour hold		Swing	-17.36	

=== Elections of the 2010s ===
2 May 2019
Party	Candidate	Votes	%	±%
Labour	Dan Barrington	2,039	68.17	▼1.71
Liberal Democrats	Paul John Twigger Parr	265	8.86	▲0.76
Green	Elke Weissmann	247	8.26	▲4.96
Liberal	Ann Hines	241	8.06	▼0.48
Conservative	Pauline Shuttleworth	199	6.65	▼2.01
Majority		1,774	59.31	▼1.90
Turnout		2,991	27.34	▼2.01
Registered electors		10,939		
Rejected ballots		33	1.10	▲0.91
Labour hold		Swing	-1.23	

Liverpool City Council Municipal Elections 2018: 3rd May 2018
Party	Candidate	Votes	%	±%
Labour	Pam Thomas	2,243	69.88	▲10.76
Conservative	Pauline Shuttleworth	278	8.66	▲4.87
Liberal	Ann Hines	274	8.54	▼5.17
Liberal Democrats	Paul John Twigger Parr	260	8.10	▼1.73
Green	Ellie Pontin	107	3.33	▼0.58
TUSC	Ann Barbara Walsh	48	1.50	N/A
Majority		1,965	61.21	▲15.80
Turnout		3,216	29.35	▼1.92
Registered electors		10,958		
Rejected ballots		6	0.19	
Labour hold		Swing	2.94	

Liverpool City Council Municipal Elections 2015: 5th May 2016
Party	Candidate	Votes	%	±%
Labour	Lana Orr	1,997	59.12	▼12.60
Liberal	Ann Hines	463	13.71	▲9.66
Liberal Democrats	Graham Hulme	332	9.83	▲5.37
UKIP	Stuart Monkcom	326	9.65	▲1.08
Green	Ellie Pontin	132	3.91	▲0.82
Conservative	John Ainsley Watson	128	3.79	▼2.96
Majority		1,534	45.41	▼17.74
Turnout		3,410	31.27	▼37.63
Registered electors		10,904		
Rejected ballots		32	0.94	
Labour hold		Swing	11.13	

Liverpool City Council Municipal Elections 2015: 7th May 2015
Party	Candidate	Votes	%	±%
Labour	Daniel Barrington	5,479	71.72	▲16.14
UKIP	Stuart Monkcom	655	8.57	▼13.01
Conservative	Pauline Ann Shuttleworth	516	6.75	▲2.57
Liberal Democrats	Graham Hulme	341	4.46	▼1.31
Liberal	Ann Hines	309	4.05	▼2.59
Green	Simeon Hart	236	3.09	▼1.26
TUSC	David Jones	103	1.35	▼0.55
Majority		4,824	63.15	▲29.15
Turnout		7,639	68.9	▲36.47
Labour hold		Swing	+9.43	

Liverpool City Council Municipal Elections 2014: 22nd May 2014
Party	Candidate	Votes	%	±%
Labour	Pam Thomas	1,993	55.58	▼5.85
UKIP	Stuart Monkcom	774	21.58	n/a
Liberal	Ann Hines	238	6.64	▼5.42
Liberal Democrats	Graham Hulme	207	5.77	▼11.72
Green	Mark Coleman	156	4.35	▼0.14
Conservative	Pauline Ann Shuttleworth	150	4.18	▼0.34
TUSC	Ann Barbara Walsh	68	1.90%	n/a
Majority		1,219	34.00	▼9.94
Turnout		3586	32.43	▲2.89
Labour hold		Swing	-13.72	

Liverpool City Council Municipal Elections 2012: 3rd May 2012
Party	Candidate	Votes	%	±%
Labour	Lana Orr	2,378	61.43	▲1.67
Liberal Democrats	Graham Hulme	677	17.49	▼9.72
Liberal	Ann Hines	467	12.06	▲7.55
Conservative	Diane Isabel Watson	175	4.52	▲0.01
Green	Martin Trevor Randall	174	4.49	▲2.29
Majority		1,701	43.94	▲11.38
Turnout		3,871	35.32	▼6.83
Labour gain from Liberal Democrats		Swing	-4.03	

Liverpool City Council Municipal Elections 2011: 5th May 2011
Party	Candidate	Votes	%	±%
Labour	Daniel Barrington	2770	59.76%	+11.65%
Liberal Democrats	Norman Mills	1261	27.21%	−5.79%
Conservative	Diane Isobel Watson	232	5.01%	−3.04%
Liberal	Ann Hines	209	4.51%	−5.05%
Green	Martin Trevor Randall	102	2.20%	+0.91%
Socialist Labour	Kim Singleton	61	1.32%	n/a
Majority		1509	32.56%	+17.46%
Turnout		4635	42.15%	−22.17%
Labour gain from Liberal Democrats		Swing	+8.72%	

Liverpool City Council Municipal Elections 2010: West Derby
Party	Candidate	Votes	%	±%
Labour	Pam Thomas	3391	48.11%	+22.24%
Liberal Democrats	Stuart Monkcom	2326	33.00%	−4.29
Liberal	Ann Hines	674	9.56%	−12.35
Conservative	Andrew Desborough	567	8.05%	−2.08%
Green	Martin Trevor Randall	91	1.29%	−3.51%
Majority		1,065	15.10%	
Turnout		7049	64.32%	+34.38%
Labour gain from Liberal Democrats		Swing	+13.27%	

=== Elections of the 2000s ===
Liverpool City Council Municipal Elections 2008: West Derby
Party	Candidate	Votes	%	±%
Liberal Democrats	Graham Hulme	1244	37.29%	
Labour	Brenda McGrath	863	25.87%	
Liberal	Ann Hines	731	21.91%	
Conservative	Neil Wilson	338	10.13%	
Green	Kim Graham	160	4.80%	
Majority		381	11.4%	
Turnout		3336	29.94	
Liberal Democrats hold		Swing		

Liverpool City Council Municipal Elections 2007: West Derby
Party	Candidate	Votes	%	±%
Liberal Democrats	Norman Mills	1751	55.41%	
Labour	Ged Taylor	758	23.99%	
Conservative	Geoffrey Elsmore Brandwood	261	8.26%	
Liberal	Patricia Margaret Elmour	209	6.61%	
Green	Ian Graham	181	5.73%	
Majority		993	31.4%	
Turnout		3160	28.32	
Liberal Democrats hold		Swing		

Liverpool City Council Municipal Elections 2006: West Derby
Party	Candidate	Votes	%	±%
Liberal Democrats	Stuart Monkcom	1416	49.49%	
Labour	Ronald James Foy	652	22.79	
Conservative	Geoffrey Elsmore Brandwood	308	10.77%	
Liberal	Stephen Houghland	222	7.76%	
Green	Ian Graham	204	7.13%	
Socialist Labour	Stephen Hill	59	2.06%	
Majority		764	26.7%	
Turnout		2861	25.22%	
Liberal Democrats hold		Swing		

After the boundary change of 2004 the whole of Liverpool City Council faced election. Three Councillors were returned at this election.

Liverpool City Council Municipal Elections 2004: West Derby
Party	Candidate	Votes	%	±%
Liberal Democrats	Ann Hines	2436		
Liberal Democrats	Norman Mills	2202		
Liberal Democrats	Stuart Monkcom	2058		
Labour	Joseph Foy	782		
Labour	Lilian Foy	764		
Labour	Ronald Foy	718		
Conservative	Geoffrey Brandwood	378		
Green	Ian Graham	305		
Liberal	Edith Bamford	302		
Liberal	Patricia Elmour	282		
UKIP	Kenneth Crick	266		
Liberal	Barbara Pickstock	265		
Socialist Labour	Patrick Goodwin	95		
Majority				
Turnout		4151	36.36	
Liberal Democrats hold		Swing	n/a	

== See also ==
- Liverpool City Council
- Liverpool City Council elections 1880–present
- Liverpool Town Council elections 1835 - 1879
