= 1892 Liverpool City Council election =

Liverpool City Council elections 1892

- November 1, 1892

16 seats were up for election (one third): one seat for each of the 16 wards 33 (incl. Aldermen) seats needed for a majority

Elections to Liverpool City Council were held on Tuesday 1 November 1892. One third of the council seats were up for election, the term of office of each councillor being three years.

After the election, the composition of the council was:

Party	Councillors	±	Aldermen	Total
Conservative	??	-3	8	??
Liberal	??	+3	6	??
Irish Nationalists	5	-1	2	7
Independent Irish Nationalist	1	+1	0	1
Liberal Unionist	1	+1	0	1
Independent	1	0	0	1

== Election result ==
Liverpool local election result 1892
Party	Seats	Gains	Losses	Net gain/loss	Seats %	Votes %	Votes	+/−
Conservative	4	0	3	-3	25%	51%	19,285	
Liberal	9	3	0	+3	56%	41%	15,584	
Liberal Unionist	1	0	0	0	6%			
Irish Nationalist	1	0	1	-1	6%			
Independent Irish Nationalist	1	1	0	+1	6%	7%	2,511	
Labour	0	0	0	0	0%	0.46%	174	

== Ward results ==
* - Retiring Councillor seeking re-election

=== Abercromby ===
No. 11 Abercromby
Party	Candidate	Votes	%	±%
Liberal	Charles Henry Beloe	785	50.3%	
Conservative	Thomas Menlove *	776	49.7%	
Majority		9	0.6%	N/A
Registered electors				
Turnout		1,561		
Liberal gain from Conservative		Swing		

=== Castle Street ===
No. 6 Castle Street
Party	Candidate	Votes	%	±%
Liberal Unionist	Henry Hugh Hornby *	unopposed		
Registered electors				
Liberal Unionist hold		Swing		

=== Everton ===
No. 1 Everton
Party	Candidate	Votes	%	±%
Conservative	Austin Taylor	6,171	62%	
Liberal	Robert Roberts	3,741	38%	
Majority		2,430	24%	
Registered electors				
Turnout		9,912		
Conservative hold		Swing		

=== Exchange ===
No. 5 Exchange
Party	Candidate	Votes	%	±%
Liberal	Robert Durning Holt *	955	59%	
Conservative	David MacIver	655	41%	
Majority		300	18%	
Registered electors				
Turnout		1,610		
Liberal hold		Swing		

=== Great George ===
No. 9 Great George
Party	Candidate	Votes	%	±%
Liberal	Simeon Smith	481	64%	
Conservative	James Lowry	248	33%	
Labour	Charles Henry Rouse	20	3%	
Majority		233	31%	
Registered electors				
Turnout		749		
Liberal hold		Swing		

=== Lime Street ===
No. 12 Lime Street
Party	Candidate	Votes	%	±%
Liberal	Jeremiah Miles	634	53%	
Conservative	John Duncan *	573	47%	
Majority		61	6%	N/A
Registered electors				
Turnout		1,207		
Liberal gain from Conservative		Swing		

=== North Toxteth ===
No. 16 North Toxteth
Party	Candidate	Votes	%	±%
Conservative	Herbert Campbell *	2,953	55%	
Liberal	Egerton Stewart Brown	2,411	45%	
Majority		542	10%	
Registered electors				
Turnout		5,364		
Conservative hold		Swing		

=== Pitt Street ===
No. 8 Pitt Street
Party	Candidate	Votes	%	±%
Liberal	Henry Charles Hawley *	unopposed		
Registered electors				
Liberal hold		Swing		

=== Rodney Street ===
No. 10 Rodney Street
Party	Candidate	Votes	%	±%
Liberal	Archibald Williamson	unopposed		
Registered electors				
Liberal hold		Swing		

=== St. Anne Street ===
No. 13 St. Anne Street
Party	Candidate	Votes	%	±%
Liberal	Eli Brooks	922	62%	
Conservative	Robert Foote	572	38%	
Majority		350	24%	N/A
Registered electors				
Turnout		1,494		
Liberal gain from Conservative		Swing		

=== St. Paul's ===
No. 4 St. Paul's
Party	Candidate	Votes	%	±%
Liberal	Philip Henry Rathbone *	552	56%	
Conservative	Charles Stewart Dean	431	44%	
Majority		121	12%	
Registered electors				
Turnout		983		
Liberal hold		Swing		

=== St. Peter's ===
No. 7 St. Peter's
Party	Candidate	Votes	%	±%
Liberal	William Henry Watts *	549	51%	
Conservative	Arthur Hill Holme	524	49%	
Majority		25	2%	
Registered electors				
Turnout		1,073		
Liberal hold		Swing		

=== Scotland ===
No. 2 Scotland
Party	Candidate	Votes	%	±%
Independent Irish Nationalist	George Jeremy Lynskey *	2,511	71%	
Conservative	George James Crane	1,023	29%	
Majority		1,488	42%	N/A
Registered electors				
Turnout		3,534		
Independent Irish Nationalist gain from Irish Nationalist				

=== South Toxteth ===
No. 15 South Toxteth
Party	Candidate	Votes	%	±%
Conservative	William Roberts	1,923	52%	
Liberal	Joseph Wilson	1,624	44%	
Labour	Edward Kaney	154	4%	
Majority		299	8%	
Registered electors				
Turnout		3,701		
Conservative hold		Swing		

=== Vauxhall ===
No. 3 Vauxhall
Party	Candidate	Votes	%	±%
Irish Nationalist	John Gregory Taggart *	unopposed		
Registered electors				
Irish Nationalist hold		Swing		

=== West Derby ===
No. 14 West Derby
Party	Candidate	Votes	%	±%
Conservative	Ephraim Walker *	3,436	54%	
Liberal	Dr. Joseph George McCann	2,930	46%	
Majority		506	8%	
Registered electors				
Turnout		6,366		
Conservative hold		Swing		

== Aldermanic Elections ==
At the meeting of the Council on 9 November 1892, the terms of office of eight alderman expired.

Two of these positions were already vacant :

The death of Alderman Henry Jennings had been reported to the Council on 26 October 1892.

The resignation of Alderman David MacIver had been reported to the Council on 26 October 1892.

The following eight were elected as Aldermen by the Council (Aldermen and Councillors) on 9 November 1892 for a term of six years.

* - re-elected aldermen.

Party	Alderman
Liberal	Philip Henry Rathbone JP
Irish Nationalist	Dr. Alexander Murray Bligh
Irish Nationalist	Andrew Commins
Liberal	Henry Charles Hawley
Liberal	Francis Joseph McAdam
Liberal	James Ruddin
Liberal	William Benjamin Bowring
Liberal	Frederick Smith

== By-elections ==
=== No. 9, Great George, 23 November 1892 ===
Caused by the election of Councillor James Ruddin (Liberal, Great George, elected 2 November 1892) as an alderman by the Council on 9 November 1891 .

No. 9 Great George
Party	Candidate	Votes	%	±%
Liberal	John Lamport Eills	unopposed		
Registered electors				
Liberal hold		Swing		

=== No. 2, Scotland, 23 November 1892 ===
Caused by the election of Councillor Dr. Alexander Murray Bligh (Irish Nationalist, Scotland, elected 2 November 1892) as an alderman by the Council on 9 November 1891 .

No. 2 Scotland
Party	Candidate	Votes	%	±%
Irish Nationalist	Patrick Kearney	2,322	70%	
Conservative	George James Crane	1,017	29%	
Majority		1,305	41%	
Registered electors				
Turnout		3,339		
Irish Nationalist hold		Swing		

=== No. 3, Vauxhall, 23 November 1892 ===
Caused by the election of Councillor Andrew Commins MP (Irish Nationalist, Vauxhall, elected 1 November 1891) as an alderman by the Council on 9 November 1892 .

No. 3 Vauxhall
Party	Candidate	Votes	%	±%
Irish Nationalist	Thomas John Flynn	495	69%	
	William Henry Edwardes	224	31%	
Majority		271		
Registered electors				
Turnout		719		
Irish Nationalist hold		Swing		

=== No. 4, St. Paul's, 23 November 1892 ===
Caused by the election of Councillor Philip Henry Rathbone JP (Liberal, St, Paul's, elected 1 November 1892) as an alderman by the Council on 9 November 1892 .

No. 4 St. Paul's
Party	Candidate	Votes	%	±%
Conservative	Charles Stewart Dean	517	50.6%	
Liberal	Jacob Gaitskell Brown	504	49.4%	
Majority		13	1.2%	N/A
Registered electors				
Turnout		1,021		
Conservative gain from Liberal		Swing		

=== No. 8, Pitt Street - 2 seats, 23 November 1892 ===
Caused by the election of Councillor Henry Charles Hawley (Liberal, Pitt Street, elected 1 November 1892) and Councillor Francis Joseph McAdam (Liberal, Pitt Street, elected 1 November 1890) as aldermen by the Council on 9 November 1892.

No. 8 Pitt Street - 2 seats
Party	Candidate	Votes	%	±%
Liberal	Thomas Donnelly	306	53%	
Liberal	Dr. Joseph George McCann	300	52%	
	William King	204	35%	
Labour	William Matkin	72	12%	
Registered electors				
Liberal hold		Swing		
Liberal hold		Swing		

=== No. 7, St. Peter's, 23 November 1892 ===
Caused by the election of Councillor William Benjamin Bowring (Liberal, St. Peter's, elected 1 November 1890) as an aldermen by the Council on 9 November 1892.

No. 7 St. Peter's
Party	Candidate	Votes	%	±%
Liberal	Samuel Hough	516	52%	
	John Wannop	463	46%	
Labour	William Alfred Newcombe	17	2%	
Majority		53		
Registered electors				
Turnout		996		
Liberal hold		Swing		

=== No. 8, Rodney Street - 2 seats, 23 November 1892 ===
Caused by the election of Councillor Henry Charles Hawley (Liberal, Pitt Street, elected 1 November 1892) and Councillor Francis Joseph McAdam (Liberal, Pitt Street, elected 1 November 1890) as aldermen by the Council on 9 November 1892.

No. 10 Rodney Street - 2 seats
Party	Candidate	Votes	%	±%
Liberal	Maxwell Hyslop Maxwell jnr.	808	51%	
Liberal	Egerton Stewart-Brown	771	49%	
Majority		37		
Registered electors				
Turnout		1,579		
Liberal hold		Swing		
Liberal hold		Swing		

=== No. 11, Abercromby, 18 February 1893 ===
Caused by the death of Councillor Dr. Nicholas Kennick Marsh (Conservative, Abercromby, elected 1 November 1890) on 2 February 1893.

No. 11 Abercromby
Party	Candidate	Votes	%	±%
Conservative	Thomas Menlove JP	unopposed		
Registered electors				
Conservative hold		Swing		

== See also ==
- Liverpool City Council
- Liverpool Town Council elections 1835 - 1879
- Liverpool City Council elections 1880–present
- Mayors and Lord Mayors of Liverpool 1207 to present
- History of local government in England
