= Liverpool City Council elections =

Local elections in England

Since 2023, Liverpool City Council elections have held every four years. Between 1973 and 2021 elections were generally held three years out of every four, with a third of the council being elected each time. The first election for the city council was held in 1835, and from then until 1973, elections were held every year for one third of the council, with the exceptions of boundary changes and World Wars 1 and 2. Liverpool City Council is the local authority for the metropolitan borough of Liverpool in Merseyside, England. Since the last boundary changes in 2023, 85 councillors have been elected from 64 wards, with each ward electing one, two or three councillors.

== Summary of Council composition ==
Year	Labour	Lib Dems	Liberal	Green	Other	Refs
2023	61	15	3	3	3	
2021	70	12	3	4	1	
2019	72	10	3	4	1	
2018	75	8	2	4	1	
2018	75	7	2	4	2	
2018	76	7	2	4	1	
2018	79	4	2	4	1	
2016	80	4	2	4	–	
2015	81	2	2	4	1	
2014	78	3	3	4	2	
2012	72	10	3	2	1	
2011	62	22	3	2	1	
2010	48	37	3	2	–	
2008	39	45	3	2	1	
2007	35	51	3	1	0	
2006	30	56	3	1	–	
2004	27	60	3	0	–	
2003	31	63	3	0	2	
2002	26	66	3	0	4	
2000	21	69	6	0	3	
1999	28	60	5	0	6	
1998	39	52	4	0	4	

== Council elections ==
Elections following the grant of city status to Liverpool on 12 May 1880:

Municipal Borough

- 1880
- 1881
- 1882
- 1883
- 1884
- 1885
- 1886
- 1887
- 1888

County Borough

- 1889
- 1890
- 1891
- 1892
- 1893
- 1894
- 1895
- 1896
- 1897
- 1898
- 1899
- 1900
- 1901
- 1902
- 1903
- 1904
- 1905
- 1906
- 1907
- 1908
- 1909
- 1910
- 1911
- 1912
- 1913
- 1914
- 1918
- 1919
- 1920
- 1921
- 1922
- 1923
- 1924
- 1925
- 1926
- 1927
- 1928
- 1929
- 1930
- 1931
- 1932
- 1933
- 1934
- 1935
- 1936
- 1937
- 1938
- 1945
- 1946
- 1947
- 1949
- 1950
- 1951
- 1952
- 1953
- 1954
- 1955
- 1956
- 1957
- 1958
- 1959
- 1960
- 1961
- 1962
- 1963
- 1964
- 1965
- 1966
- 1967
- 1968
- 1969
- 1970
- 1971
- 1972

Metropolitan Borough

- 1973 Boundary changes reduce the number of wards from 40 to 33, aldermen abolished.
- 1975
- 1976
- 1978
- 1979
- 1980 Whole council elected after boundary changes
- 1982
- 1983
- 1984
- 1986
- 1987
- 1988
- 1990
- 1991
- 1992
- 1994
- 1995
- 1996
- 1998
- 1999
- 2000
- 2002
- 2003
- 2004 Boundary changes reduce the number of seats by 9 to 90
- 2006
- 2007
- 2008
- 2010
- 2011
- 2012
- 2014
- 2015
- 2016
- 2018
- 2019
- 2021 (postponed from 2020 due to COVID-19 pandemic)
- 2023 Abolition of Elected Mayor. Boundary changes establish 3 three member ward, 15 two member wards and 46 single member wards, reducing the number of councillors from 90 to 85 with all-up elections every four years.

== Former wards ==
Between 1953 and 1973 the wards of Liverpool City Council were: Abercromby, Aigburth, Allerton, Anfield, Arundel, Breckfield, Broadgreen, Central, Childwall, Church, Clubmoor, County, Croxteth, Dingle, Dovecot, Everton, Fairfield, Fazakerley, Gillmoss, Granby, Kensington, Low Hill, Melrose, Netherfield, Old Swan, Picton, Pirrie, Princes Park, St Domingo, St James, St Mary's, St Michael's, Smithdown, Speke, Sandhills, Tuebrook, Vauxhall, Warbreck, Westminster, Woolton. Each ward returned three councillors and was represented by an Alderman, bringing to the total number of representatives on the City Council to 120.

In 1973, the whole council was reconstituted and the number of wards was reduced to 33. Each ward elected three councillors, and the aldermanic system was abolished.

Between 2004 and 2022 the wards of Liverpool City Council were Allerton & Hunts Cross, Anfield, Belle Vale, Central, Childwall, Church, Clubmoor, County, Cressington, Croxteth, Everton, Fazakerley, Greenbank, Kensington & Fairfield, Kirkdale, Knotty Ash, Mossley Hill, Norris Green, Old Swan, Picton, Princes Park, Riverside, Speke-Garston, St Michaels, Tuebrook & Stoneycroft, Warbreck, Wavertree, West Derby, Woolton, Yew Tree.

== See also ==
- Liverpool
- Liverpool City Council
- Liverpool Town Council elections 1835 - 1879
- Liverpool School Board elections 1870–1900
- Directly elected mayor of Liverpool - 2012–2023
- Merseyside County Council 1974–1986
- Mayors and Lord Mayors of Liverpool 1207 to present
- List of electoral wards in Merseyside
- Liverpool Liberal Democrats
