= Great George (Liverpool ward) =

Ward in Liverpool

Coordinates: 53.4010°N 2.9750°W

Great George Ward
- Mixed-use Area
- Location within Merseyside
- OS grid reference: SJ351900
  - London: 179 mi (288 km) South
- Metropolitan borough: City of Liverpool
- Metropolitan county: Merseyside
- Region: North West
- Country: England
- Sovereign state: United Kingdom
- Post town: LIVERPOOL
- Postcode district: L1, L2, L3, L6, L7, L8
- Dialling code: 0151
- Police: Merseyside
- Fire: Merseyside
- Ambulance: North West
- UK Parliament: Liverpool Riverside

Great George is a defunct ward in Liverpool, in Merseyside, England, and part of the Liverpool Riverside parliamentary constituency. Great George is bordered by the Liverpool city centre's Baltic Triangle to the west, Georgian Quarter and some parts of Ropewalks district to the north, and Toxteth to the south and east. Historically it is part of Lancashire before the establishment of Merseyside.

== Ward elections ==
=== 1914 ===
No. 17 Great George
Party	Candidate	Votes	%	±%
Liberal	John Lamport Eills *	unopposed		
Registered electors				
Liberal hold		Swing		

=== 1919 ===
No. 10 Great George
Party	Candidate	Votes	%	±%
Irish Nationalist	Thomas Owen Ruddin	unopposed		
Registered electors				
Irish Nationalist hold		Swing		

=== 1920 ===
No. 10 Great George
Party	Candidate	Votes	%	±%
Irish Nationalist	William Grogan	1,766	65%	
Liberal	Samuel Skelton *	955	35%	
Majority		811		
Registered electors		3,875		
Turnout		2,721	70%	
Irish Nationalist gain from Liberal		Swing		

=== 1921 ===
No. 10 Great George
Party	Candidate	Votes	%	±%
Irish Nationalist	Thomas Joseph Marner	1,299	57%	
Liberal	William Henry Broad	703	31%	
Independent	George Henry Bennett	283	12%	
Majority		596		
Registered electors		4,006		
Turnout		2,285	57%	
Irish Nationalist hold		Swing		

=== 1922 ===
No. 10 Great George
Party	Candidate	Votes	%	±%
Irish Nationalist	Thomas Owen Ruddin *	unopposed		
Registered electors				
Irish Nationalist hold		Swing		

=== 1923 ===
No. 10 Great George
Party	Candidate	Votes	%	±%
Irish Nationalist	William Grogan *	1,587	83%	
Labour	George Henry Bennett	322	17%	
Majority		1,265		
Registered electors		4,461		
Turnout		43%		
Irish Nationalist hold		Swing		

=== 1924 ===
No. 10 Great George
Party	Candidate	Votes	%	±%
Irish Nationalist	Thomas Joseph Marner *	unopposed		
Registered electors				
Irish Nationalist hold		Swing		

=== 1925 ===
No. 10 Great George
Party	Candidate	Votes	%	±%
Catholic	Thomas Owen Ruddin *	1,199	68%	
Labour	Alfred James Ward	561	32%	
Majority		638		
Registered electors		4,645		
Turnout		1,760	38%	
Catholic gain from Irish Nationalist		Swing		

=== 1926 ===
No. 10 Great George
Party	Candidate	Votes	%	±%
Catholic	William Grogan *	1,075	57%	
Labour	John Loughlin	816	43%	
Majority		259		
Registered electors		4,694		
Turnout		1,891	40%	
Catholic gain from		Swing		

=== 1927 ===
No. 10 Great George
Party	Candidate	Votes	%	±%
	Harry Leo Gaffeney	unopposed		
Registered electors				
		Swing		

=== 1928 ===
No. 10 Great George
Party	Candidate	Votes	%	±%
	Harry Leo Gaffeney	unopposed		
Registered electors				
		Swing		

=== 1929 ===
No. 10 Great George
Party	Candidate	Votes	%	±%
Labour	Matthew Grogan	1,546	76%	
Conservative	Louise Marie Murray	496	24%	
Majority		1,050		
Registered electors		5,299		
Turnout		2,042	39%	
Labour gain from Catholic		Swing		

=== 1930 ===
No. 10 Great George
Party	Candidate	Votes	%	±%
Democratic Labour	John Loughlin *	814	68%	
Labour	Richard Thomas Hughes	389	32%	
Majority		425		
Registered electors		5,042		
Turnout		1,203	24%	
Democratic Labour gain from Labour				

=== 1931 ===
No. 10 Great George
Party	Candidate	Votes	%	±%
Democratic Labour	Harry Leo Gaffeney *	858	59%	
Labour	Patrick Campbell	594	41%	
Majority		264		
Registered electors		5,043		
Turnout		1,452	29%	
Democratic Labour hold		Swing		

=== 1932 ===
No. 10 Great George
Party	Candidate	Votes	%	±%
Labour	Percy Ernest Sherwin	951	49%	
Democratic Labour	Matthew Grogan *	933	48%	
Youth	Leo Patrick Taylor	64	3%	
Majority		18		
Registered electors		5,048		
Turnout		1,948	39%	
Labour hold		Swing		

=== 1933 ===
No. 10 Great George
Party	Candidate	Votes	%	±%
Labour	Joseph Campbell	1,047	66%	
Independent	John Loughlin	538	34%	
Majority		509		
Registered electors		4,912		
Turnout		1,585	32%	
Labour hold		Swing		

=== 1934 ===
No. 10 Great George
Party	Candidate	Votes	%	±%
Labour	John Hamilton	1,121	66%	
Democratic Labour	Walter Oscar Stein	569	34%	
Majority		552		
Registered electors		4,916		
Turnout		1,690	34%	
Labour gain from Democratic Labour				

=== 1935 ===
No. 10 Great George
Party	Candidate	Votes	%	±%
Labour	Percy Ernest Sherwin *	1,403	59%	
Conservative	Dudley Richmond-Jones	964	41%	
Majority		439		
Registered electors		4,771		
Turnout		2,367	50%	
Labour hold		Swing		

=== 1936 ===
No. 10 Great George
Party	Candidate	Votes	%	±%
Labour	Joseph Campbell *	1,220	56%	
Conservative	William Henry Broad	965	44%	
Majority		255		
Registered electors		4,563		
Turnout		2,185	48%	
Labour hold		Swing		

=== 1937 ===
No. 10 Great George
Party	Candidate	Votes	%	±%
Labour	John Hamilton *	1,310	68%	
Independent	Stamford Botley	630	32%	
Majority		1,310		
Registered electors		4,346		
Turnout		1,940	45%	
Labour hold		Swing		

=== 1938 ===
No. 10 Great George
Party	Candidate	Votes	%	±%
Labour	Percy Ernest Sherwin *	866	56%	
Independent	John Michael Fanning	690	44%	
Majority		196		
Registered electors		4,144		
Turnout		1,576	38%	
Labour hold		Swing		

=== 1945 ===
Great George - 2 seats
Party	Candidate	Votes	%	±%
Labour	Robert Edward Cottier	unopposed		
Labour	John David Towers	unopposed		
Registered electors		3,720		

=== 1946 ===
Great George - 2 seats
Party	Candidate	Votes	%	±%
Conservative	William George Ingham	827	56%	
Conservative	John Gwilyn Hughes	805	55%	
Labour	Alexander Kay	644	44%	
Labour	John Hamilton	632	43%	
Majority		183		
Registered electors		3,953		
Turnout		1,471	37%	

=== 1947 ===
Great George
Party	Candidate	Votes	%	±%
Conservative	John Gwilym Hughes	1,016	55%	
Labour	Clifford Selly	815	45%	
Majority		201		
Registered electors		3,894		
Turnout		1,831	47%	
Conservative hold		Swing		

=== 1949 ===
Great George
Party	Candidate	Votes	%	±%
Conservative	Walter John Smith ^{(PARTY)}	823	52%	
Labour	William Tipping	761	48%	
Majority		62		
Registered electors		3,717		
Turnout		1,584	43%	
Conservative gain from Labour		Swing		

=== 1950 ===
Great George
Party	Candidate	Votes	%	±%
Labour		783	51%	+6%
Conservative		760	49%	−6%
Majority		23		
Registered electors				
Turnout		1,543		
Labour gain from Conservative		Swing		

=== 1951 ===
Great George
Party	Candidate	Votes	%	±%
Conservative	John James Coupland ^{(PARTY)}	920	57%	+2%
Labour	Thomas George Dominic Maguire	686	43%	−2%
Majority		234		
Registered electors		3,360		
Turnout		1,606	48%	+1%
Conservative hold		Swing		

=== 1952 ===
Great George
Party	Candidate	Votes	%	±%
Labour	Mrs. Elizabeth Trainor	796	52%	+4%
Conservative	Walter John Smith	747	48%	−4%
Majority		49		
Registered electors		3,376		
Turnout		1,543	46%	+3%
Labour gain from Conservative		Swing		

== Monuments ==
- St George's Hall
- Philharmonic Hall
- Chinatown, Liverpool
