= 1972 Liverpool City Council election =

1972 UK local election

← 1971	3 May 1972	1973 →

42 of 120 Councillors seats to Liverpool City Council were up for election (one third): one seat for each of the 40 wards, plus two by-elections in Vauxhall and Woolton. 81 of 120 Councillors and 40 Aldermen seats needed for a majority
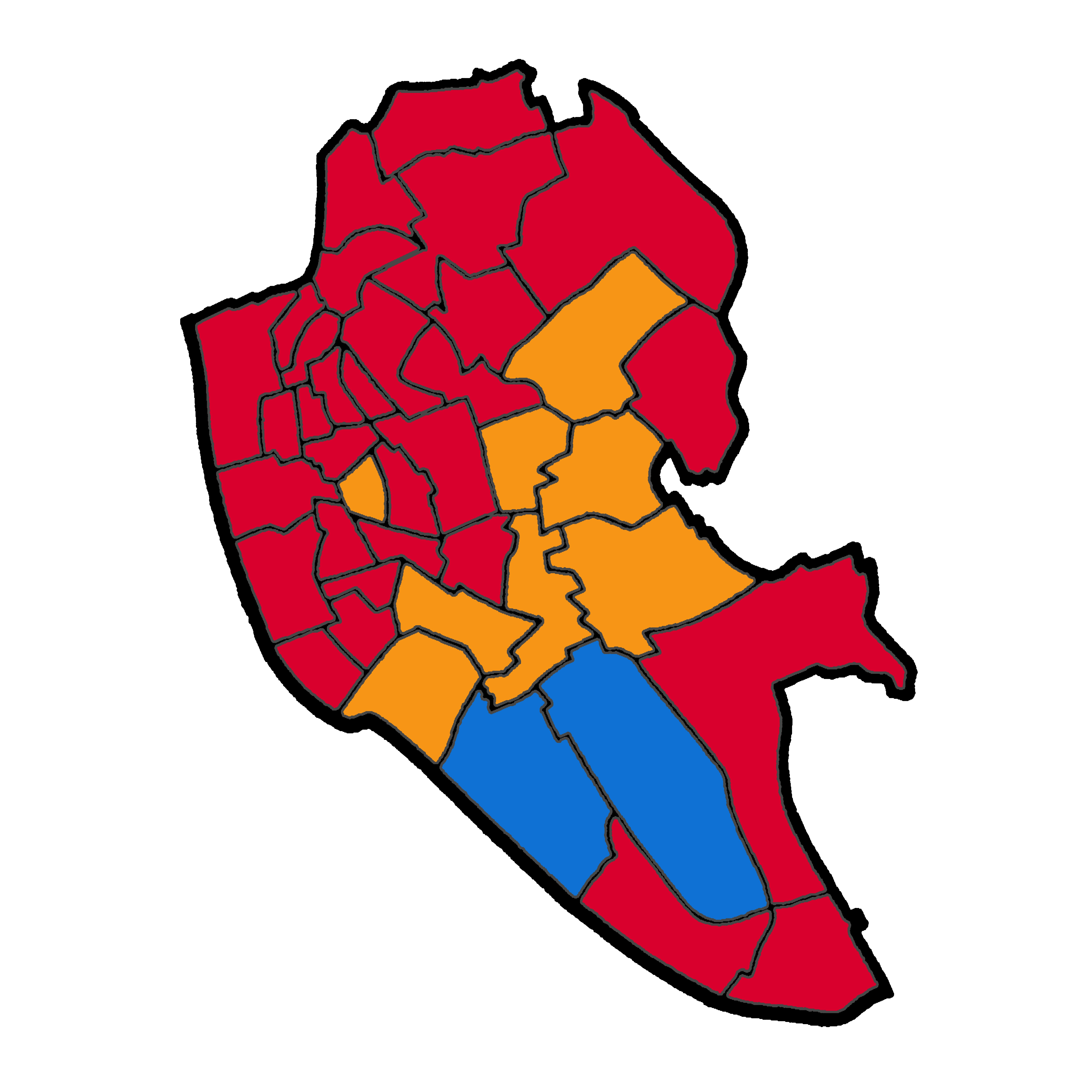
- Map of Liverpool showing wards won (first placed party)

Elections to Liverpool City Council were held on 3 May 1972. One seat in each of the forty wards was up for election, plus one by-election seat each in Vauxhall and Woolton wards. This was the last year when the council comprised 120 councillors and 40 Aldermen, totalling 160, which was the largest council membership .

After the election, the composition of the council was:

Party	Councillors	±	Aldermen
Labour	73	+18	??
Conservative	29	-24	??
Liberal	14	+7	??
Protestant	3	-2	0

== Election result ==
Liverpool local election result 1972
Party	Seats	Gains	Losses	Net gain/loss	Seats %	Votes %	Votes	+/−
Labour	31	19	1	+18	74%	50%	74,703	
Liberal	8	7	0	+7	19%	16%	23,549	
Conservative	3	0	24	-24	7%	33%	49,187	
Protestant	0	0	2	-2	0%	1%	1,494	
Communist	0	0	0	0	0%	0.6%	934	

== Ward results ==
This data is compared with the election results for 1969, when the councillors were elected for a three-year term.

* - Councillor seeking re-election

^{(PARTY)} - Party of former Councillor

=== Abercromby ===
Abercromby
Party	Candidate	Votes	%	±%
Labour	W. F. Burke *	871	79%	+35%
Conservative	L. W. Mossford	139	13%	−26%
Communist	A. McClelland	96	9%	−5%
Majority		732		
Registered electors		5,218		
Turnout		1,106	21%	0%
Labour hold		Swing		

=== Aigburth ===
Aigburth
Party	Candidate	Votes	%	±%
Conservative	S. T. Moss *	3,639	81%	−11%
Labour	R. Fogg	875	19%	+11%
Majority		2,764		
Registered electors		14,550		
Turnout		4,514	31%	−5%
Conservative hold		Swing		

=== Allerton ===
Allerton
Party	Candidate	Votes	%	±%
Conservative	W. S. D. Weaver ^{(PARTY)}	2,509	68%	−2%
Labour	P. T. Ash	1,178	32%	+25%
Majority		1,331		
Registered electors		10,977		
Turnout		3,687	34%	−5%
Conservative hold		Swing		

=== Anfield ===
Anfield
Party	Candidate	Votes	%	±%
Labour	R. J. Short	2,733	56%	+32%
Conservative	J. Mass ^{(PARTY)}	2,143	44%	−32%
Majority		590		
Registered electors		13,430		
Turnout		4,876	36%	+6%
Labour gain from Conservative		Swing		

=== Arundel ===
Arundel
Party	Candidate	Votes	%	±%
Liberal	C. Hutchinson	2,093	44%	+25%
Conservative	K. W. Edwards *	1,368	29%	−33%
Labour	A. L. Jones	1,262	27%	+13%
Majority		725		
Registered electors		14,405		
Turnout		4,723	33%	+2%
Liberal gain from Conservative		Swing		

=== Breckfield ===
Breckfield
Party	Candidate	Votes	%	±%
Labour	T. Roberts	1,197	41%	+13%
Liberal	P. Chivall	1,069	37%	+19%
Conservative	D. J. Lewis ^{(PARTY)}	625	22%	−32%
Majority		128		
Registered electors		8,243		
Turnout		2,891	35%	+5%
Labour gain from Conservative		Swing		

=== Broadgreen ===
Broadgreen
Party	Candidate	Votes	%	±%
Liberal	G. J. Palmer	2,066	47%	+17%
Conservative	D. J. Jones *	1,330	30%	−27%
Labour	L. Collins	1,031	23%	+10%
Majority		736		
Registered electors		12,103		
Turnout		4,427	37%	+6%
Liberal gain from Conservative		Swing		

=== Central ===
Central
Party	Candidate	Votes	%	±%
Labour	G. G. Maloney *	1,400	98%	+49%
Conservative	S. V. Hennessy	27	2%	−47%
Majority		1,373		
Registered electors		4,898		
Turnout		1,427	29%	−7%
Labour hold		Swing		

=== Childwall ===
Childwall
Party	Candidate	Votes	%	±%
Liberal	Anthony Limont	3,641	45%	+27%
Conservative	F. H. Andrews *	3,376	42%	−31%
Labour	R. McConnell	1,068	13%	+6%
Majority		265		
Registered electors		18,947		
Turnout		8,085	43%	+8%
Liberal gain from Conservative		Swing		

=== Church ===
Church
Party	Candidate	Votes	%	±%
Liberal	Joseph Robert Wilmington	3,058	52%	−3%
Conservative	W. H. Stabback	2,363	40%	−2%
Labour	J. P. Connelly	457	8%	+5%
Majority		695		
Registered electors		14,655		
Turnout		5,878	40%	−8%
Liberal hold		Swing		

=== Clubmoor ===
Clubmoor
Party	Candidate	Votes	%	±%
Labour	G. G. Pratt	2,254	55%	+17%
Conservative	A. L. Jones ^{(PARTY)}	1,808	45%	−17%
Majority		446		
Registered electors		10,972		
Turnout		4,062	37%	+1%
Labour gain from Conservative		Swing		

=== County ===
County
Party	Candidate	Votes	%	±%
Labour	E. T. Mooney	2,653	61%	+34%
Conservative	H. Brown ^{(PARTY)}	1,730	39%	−28%
Majority		923		
Registered electors		12,863		
Turnout		4,383	34%	+2%
Labour gain from Conservative		Swing		

=== Croxteth ===
Croxteth
Party	Candidate	Votes	%	±%
Liberal	K. W. Hart	2,505	45%	+45%
Conservative	A. L. Audley *	2,051	37%	−50%
Labour	T. Bouch	1,043	19%	−+6%
Majority		454		
Registered electors		12,845		
Turnout		5,599	44%	+10%
Liberal gain from Labour		Swing		

=== Dingle ===
Dingle
Party	Candidate	Votes	%	±%
Labour	Mrs. M. Evans ^{(PARTY)}	2,075	75%	+15%
Conservative	J. McDermott	605	22%	−15%
Communist	J. Cook	84	3%	0%
Majority		1,470		
Registered electors		8,577		
Turnout		2,764	32%	−6%
Labour hold		Swing		

=== Dovecot ===
Dovecot
Party	Candidate	Votes	%	±%
Labour	W. H. Westbury ^{(PARTY)}	3,402	70%	+9%
Conservative	J. L. Walsh	1,473	30%	−9%
Majority		1,929		
Registered electors		16,542		
Turnout		4,875	30%	−3%
Labour hold		Swing		

=== Everton ===
Everton
Party	Candidate	Votes	%	±%
Labour	T. McManus ^{(PARTY)}	620	80%	+18%
Conservative	R. S. Charles	159	20%	−18%
Majority		461		
Registered electors		2,898		
Turnout		779	27%	−2%
Labour hold		Swing		

=== Fairfield ===
Fairfield
Party	Candidate	Votes	%	±%
Labour	H. Livermore	1,578	40%	−4%
Liberal	C. Crawford	1,442	36%	+36%
Conservative	E. Crierie	960	24%	−32%
Majority		136		
Registered electors		11,380		
Turnout		3,980	35%	+7%
Labour gain from Conservative		Swing		

=== Fazakerley ===
Fazakerley
Party	Candidate	Votes	%	±%
Labour	A. Williams	2,548	61%	+15%
Conservative	A. Lloyd ^{(PARTY)}	1,602	39%	−15%
Majority		946		
Registered electors		12,051		
Turnout		4,150	34%	−2%
Labour gain from Conservative		Swing		

=== Gillmoss ===
Gillmoss
Party	Candidate	Votes	%	±%
Labour	T. Higgins	4,454	74%	+30%
Conservative	G. Smith ^{(PARTY)}	1,057	17%	−33%
Tenants' Association	C. Boyd	433	7%	
Communist	K. Dunlop	109	2%	−4%
Majority		3,397		
Registered electors		20.132		
Turnout		6,053	30%	+6%
Labour gain from Conservative		Swing		

=== Granby ===
Granby
Party	Candidate	Votes	%	±%
Labour	Mrs. M. Simey *	1,640	75%	+25%
Conservative	L. D. Wollen	484	22%	−24%
Communist	J. V. Powell	69	3%	−1%
Majority		1,156		
Registered electors		8,086		
Turnout		2,193	27%	+1%
Labour hold		Swing		

=== Kensington ===
Kensington
Party	Candidate	Votes	%	±%
Labour	C. Perry	1,909	59%	+34%
Conservative	J. G. Barrett *	896	28%	−26%
Liberal	Graham Hulme	432	13%	+13%
Majority		1,013		
Registered electors		9,953		
Turnout		3,237	33%	+4%
Labour gain from Conservative		Swing		

=== Low Hill ===
Low Hill
Party	Candidate	Votes	%	±%
Liberal	David Alton	1,061	55%	+55%
Labour	V. McCoy	666	34%	−5%
Conservative	T. P. Pink *	208	11%	−46%
Majority		395		
Registered electors		4,286		
Turnout		1,935	45%	+16%
Liberal gain from Conservative		Swing		

=== Melrose ===
Melrose
Party	Candidate	Votes	%	±%
Labour	B. Shaw *	1,578	79%	+29%
Conservative	A. J. Browne	421	21%	−29%
Majority		1,157		
Registered electors		7,146		
Turnout		1,999	28%	+4%
Labour gain from Conservative		Swing		

=== Netherfield ===
Netherfield
Party	Candidate	Votes	%	±%
Labour	F. P. Hughes	869	55%	+32%
Protestant	W. Owens *	712	45%	−25%
Majority		157		
Registered electors		4,280		
Turnout		1,581	37%	+16%
Labour gain from Protestant		Swing		

=== Old Swan ===
Old Swan
Party	Candidate	Votes	%	±%
Liberal	W. M. Galbraith	2,597	49%	+8%
Labour	F. Keating	1,368	26%	+12%
Conservative	N. F. Derrick *	1,358	26%	−19%
Majority		1,229		
Registered electors		13,581		
Turnout		5,323	39%	+5%
Liberal gain from Conservative		Swing		

=== Picton ===
Picton
Party	Candidate	Votes	%	±%
Labour	M. Aspin	2,056	52%	+18%
Conservative	Dr. Thomas Lyrian Hobday *	1,133	29%	−33%
Liberal	J. A. Gallagher	655	17%	+17%
Communist	J. G. Volleamere	85	2%	+2%
Majority		923		
Registered electors		12,543		
Turnout		3,929	31%	+3%
Labour gain from Conservative		Swing		

=== Pirrie ===
Pirrie
Party	Candidate	Votes	%	±%
Labour	P. Owens	3,902	68%	+28%
Conservative	I. Balmer *	1,829	32%	−28%
Majority		2,073		
Registered electors		16,374		
Turnout		5,731	35%	+7%
Labour gain from Conservative		Swing		

=== Prince's Park ===
Prince's Park
Party	Candidate	Votes	%	±%
Labour	Cyril Taylor *	2,313	73%	+23%
Conservative	M. Kingston	748	24%	−20%
Communist	J. F. Greig	86	3%	−3%
Majority		1,565		
Registered electors		8,373		
Turnout		3.147	38%	−8%
Labour hold		Swing		

=== Sandhills ===
Sandhills
Party	Candidate	Votes	%	±%
Labour	V. P. Hyams *	1,479	91%	+31%
Conservative	R. Walsh	139	9%	−27%
Majority		1,340		
Registered electors		5,295		
Turnout		1,618	31%	+6%
Labour hold		Swing		

=== St. Domingo ===
St. Domingo
Party	Candidate	Votes	%	±%
Labour	K. Jones	783	50%	+14%
Protestant	H. W. Blower *	782	50%	−11%
Majority		1		
Registered electors		4,806		
Turnout		1,565	33%	−10%
Labour gain from Protestant		Swing		

=== St. James ===
St. James
Party	Candidate	Votes	%	±%
Labour	E. Shields *	2.512	82%	+31%
Communist	R. O'Hara	356	12%	−10%
Conservative	F. Jones	196	6%	−19%
Majority		2,156		
Registered electors		8,642		
Turnout		3,064	35%	+2%
Labour hold		Swing		

=== St. Mary's ===
St. Mary's
Party	Candidate	Votes	%	±%
Labour	S. R. Maddox	2,362	65%	+33%
Conservative	R. E. Lloyd *	1,256	35%	−33%
Majority		1,106		
Registered electors		10,310		
Turnout		3,618	35%	+3%
Labour gain from Conservative		Swing		

=== St. Michael's ===
St. Michael's
Party	Candidate	Votes	%	±%
Liberal	C. Graham	2,696	57%	+57%
Conservative	R. M. Aymes ^{(PARTY)}	1,277	27%	−54%
Labour	F. W. Longworth	700	15%	−4%
Majority		1,419		
Registered electors		10,712		
Turnout		4,722	44%	+16%
Liberal gain from Conservative		Swing		

=== Smithdown ===
Smithdown
Party	Candidate	Votes	%	±%
Labour	E. W. Gorman	1,246	75%	+34%
Conservative	J. W. Butler *	282	17%	−37%
Liberal	W. A. Bartels	130	8%	+8%
Majority		964		
Registered electors		6,718		
Turnout		1,658	25%	+7%
Labour gain from Conservative		Swing		

=== Speke ===
Speke
Party	Candidate	Votes	%	±%
Labour	P. Moorhead	3,634	73%	+29%
Conservative	E. M. Clein *	1,330	27%	−29%
Majority		2,304		
Registered electors		15,236		
Turnout		4,964	33%	+11%
Labour gain from Conservative		Swing		

=== Tuebrook ===
Tuebrook
Party	Candidate	Votes	%	±%
Labour	J. E. Roberts	2,419	61%	+31%
Conservative	D. E. Daniel ^{(PARTY)}	1,563	39%	−31%
Majority		856		
Registered electors		11,786		
Turnout		3,982	34%	+3%
Labour gain from Conservative		Swing		

=== Vauxhall ===
Vauxhall 2 seats
Party	Candidate	Votes	%	±%
Labour	Mrs. C. O'Rourke ^{(PARTY)}	1,312	93%	+25%
Labour	G. R. Sullivan ^{(PARTY)}	1,140	81%	+13%
Liberal	J. J. Hastings	69	5%	−20%
Conservative	H. Davies	32	2%	−2%
Conservative	I. McFall	28	2%	−2%
Majority		1,243		
Registered electors		5,866		
Turnout		1,413	24%	+5%
Labour hold		Swing		
Labour hold		Swing		

=== Warbreck ===
Warbreck
Party	Candidate	Votes	%	±%
Labour	E. Kelly	1,931	52%	+31%
Conservative	R. B. Flude ^{(PARTY)}	1,786	48%	−31%
Majority		145		
Registered electors		12,333		
Turnout		3,717	30%	−2%
Labour gain from Conservative		Swing		

=== Westminster ===
Westminster
Party	Candidate	Votes	%	±%
Labour	J. Gardner	1,401	71%	+29%
Conservative	J. Wareing *	569	29%	−29%
Majority		832		
Registered electors		5,779		
Turnout		1,970	34%	+2%
Labour gain from Conservative		Swing		

=== Woolton ===
Woolton 2 seats
Party	Candidate	Votes	%	±%
Labour	L. Evans ^{(PARTY)}	4,834	50%	+8%
Conservative	L. B. Williams ^{(PARTY)}	4,771	50%	−8%
Conservative	C. G. Hallows	4,600	48%	−10%
Labour	K. Simpson	4,561	47%	+5%
Majority		63		
Registered electors		30,380		
Turnout		9,605	32%	0%
Conservative hold		Swing		
Labour gain from Conservative		Swing		
