= Arundel (Liverpool ward) =

- Arundel ward within Liverpool
- Population: 3,670 (2023 electorate)
- Metropolitan borough: City of Liverpool
- Metropolitan county: Merseyside
- Region: North West
- Country: England
- Sovereign state: United Kingdom
- UK Parliament: Liverpool Wavertree
- Councillors: Laura Robertson-Collins (Labour Party)

Arundel ward is an electoral district of Liverpool City Council. It was created in 1953 from the Sefton Park East ward. Its boundaries were changed for the 1973 elections and again for the 1980 elections.

In the Local Government Boundary Commission's Report on the 1980 reorganisation the proposed new boundaries for the ward were described as "Commencing at a point where Ullet Road meets Sefton Park Road, thence northwards along said road and Lodge Lane to the southern boundary of Smithdown Ward, thence southeastwarda along said boundary and the southern boundary of Picton Ward to the western boundary of Church Ward, thence southeastwards, southwestwards and southeastwards along said boundary to the road known as Queens Drive Mossley Hill, thence southwestwards along said road to Mossley Hill Drive, thence northwestwards along said drive to the road known as Croxteth Gate, thence northwards along said road to Ullet Road, thence southwestwards along said road to the point of commencement."

The ward was dissolved prior to the 2004 Liverpool City Council Elections and distributed into by the re-arranged Church and Picton wards, the reinstated St. Michael's ward and the new Greenbank ward.

The 2022 review by the Local Government Boundary Commission for England decided that the existing 30 wards each represented by three Councillors should be replaced by 64 wards represented by 85 councillors with varying representation by one, two or three councillors per ward. The Arundel ward was recreated as a smaller, single-member ward from a section of the previous Greenbank and Picton wards. The new ward is roughly bounded by Smithdown Road, Lodge Lane, Fern Grove, Hartington Road and Ullet Road .

== Councillors ==
Election	Councillor	Councillor	Councillor
1953	J.N.M Entwistle (Con)	Harold Lees (Con)	W.I. Throssell (Con)
1954	J.N.M Entwistle (Con)	Harold Lees (Con)	W.I. Throssell (Con)
1955	J.N.M Entwistle (Con)	Harold Lees (Con)	W.I. Throssell (Con)
1956	J.N.M Entwistle (Con)	Harold Lees (Con)	W.I. Throssell (Con)
1957	P.W. Rathbone (Con)	Harold Lees (Con)	W.I. Throssell (Con)
1958	P.W. Rathbone (Con)	Harold Lees (Con)	W.I. Throssell (Con)
1959	P.W. Rathbone (Con)	Harold Lees (Con)	Clifford Price (Con)
1960	P.W. Rathbone (Con)	Harold Lees (Con)	Clifford Price (Con)
1961	P.W. Rathbone (Con)	Harold Lees (Con)	Clifford Price (Con)
1962	P.W. Rathbone (Con)	Harold Lees (Con)	Clifford Price (Con)
1963	P.W. Rathbone (Con)	Harold Lees (Con)	Clifford Price (Con)
1964	P.W. Rathbone (Con)	John E. Kendrick (Con)	Clifford Price (Con)
1965	P.W. Rathbone (Con)	John E. Kendrick (Con)	Clifford Price (Con)
1966	Kevin W. Edwards (Con)	John E. Kendrick (Con)	Clifford Price (Con)
1967	Kevin W. Edwards (Con)	John E. Kendrick (Con)	Clifford Price (Con)
1968	Kevin W. Edwards (Con)	John E. Kendrick (Con)	Clifford Price (Con)
1969	Kevin W. Edwards (Con)	John E. Kendrick (Con)	Clifford Price (Con)
1970	Kevin W. Edwards (Con)	John E. Kendrick (Con)	Clifford Price (Con)
1971	Kevin W. Edwards (Con)	John E. Kendrick (Con)	N. Wood (Lib)
1972	Charles Hutchinson (Lib)	John E. Kendrick (Con)	N. Wood (Lib)
1973	Charles Hutchinson (Lib)	K. Rainford (Lib)	N. Wood (Lib)
1975	Charles Hutchinson (Lib)	K. Rainford (Lib)	N. Wood (Lib)
1976	Charles Hutchinson (Lib)	K. Rainford (Lib)	N. Wood (Lib)
1978	Charles Hutchinson (Lib)	K. Rainford (Lib)	Ronald Spencer-Fairclough (Con)
1979	Charles Hutchinson (Lib)	Julie Lyon-Taylor (Lab)	Ronald Spencer-Fairclough (Con)
1980	Charles Hutchinson (Lib)	Julie Lyon-Taylor (Lab)	Patrick Grannell (Lab)
1982	Charles Hutchinson (Lib)	Julie Lyon-Taylor (Lab)	Mary Johnston (Lib)
1983	Charles Hutchinson (Lib)	Julie Lyon-Taylor (Lab)	Mary Johnston (Lib)
1984	S.J. Hicks (All)	Julie Lyon-Taylor (Lab)	Mary Johnston (Lib)
1987	S.J. Hicks (All)	Julie Lyon-Taylor (Lab)	Roger Johnston (All)
1988	S.J. Hicks (SLD)	M. Victoria Roberts (Lab)	Roger Johnston (SLD)
1990	Andrew Duckworth (Lab)	M. Victoria Roberts (Lab)	Roger Johnston (SLD)
1991	Andrew Duckworth (Lab)	M. Victoria Roberts (Lab)	Roger Johnston (LD)
1992	Andrew Duckworth (Lab)	Paul Clein (LD)	Roger Johnston (LD)
1994	Jan Clein (LD)	Paul Clein (LD)	Roger Johnston (LD)
1995	Jan Clein (LD)	Paul Clein (LD)	Paul Brant (Lab)
1996	Jan Clein (LD)	Paul Clein (LD)	Paul Brant (Lab)
1998	Jan Clein (LD)	Paul Clein (LD)	Paul Brant (Lab)
1999	Jan Clein (LD)	Paul Clein (LD)	Mirna Juarez (LD)
2000	Jan Clein (LD)	Paul Clein (LD)	Mirna Juarez (LD)
2002	Jan Clein (LD)	Paul Clein (LD)	Mirna Juarez (LD)
2003	Jan Clein (LD)	Paul Clein (LD)	Mirna Juarez (LD)
2004 - 2022 WARD DISESTABLISHED
2023	Laura Robertson-Collins (Lab)		

indicates seat up for re-election after boundary changes.

indicates seat up for re-election.

indicates change in affiliation.

indicates seat up for re-election after casual vacancy.

== Election results ==
=== Elections of the 2020s ===
==== 2023 ====
Thursday, 4th May 2023
Party	Candidate	Votes	%	±%
Labour	Laura Annette Robertson-Collins	716	73.44	
Green	Rachael Joanne Blackman Stretton	154	15.79	
Liberal Democrats	Jeremy Clein	105	10.77	
Majority		562	57.65	
Turnout		975	26.54	
Rejected ballots		8	0.81	
Total ballots		983	26.79	
Registered electors		3,670		
Labour win (new seat)				

=== Elections of the 2000s ===
==== 2003 ====
Thursday, 1st May 2003
Party	Candidate	Votes	%	±%
Liberal Democrats	Mirna Juarez	1,141	61.21%	▲7.53
Labour	Anthony Murphy	401	21.51%	▼7.91
Green	Donald Ross	144	7.73%	▲0.08
Socialist Alliance	Ian Foulkes	125	6.71%	▲1.00
Conservative	Ann Nugent	53	2.84%	▼0.71
Majority		740	39.70%	▲15.44
Registered electors		11,131		
Turnout		1,864	16.75%	▼5.11
Rejected ballots				
Liberal Democrats hold		Swing	▲7.72	

==== 2002 ====
Thursday, 2nd May 2002
Party	Candidate	Votes	%	±%
Liberal Democrats	Jan Clein	1,299	53.68%	▼6.10
Labour	Neville Bann	712	29.42%	▲3.65
Green	Donald Ross	185	7.64%	▼0.48
Socialist Alliance	Robert Foulkes	138	5.70%	Steady
Conservative	Ann Nugent	86	3.55%	▼0.79
Majority		587	24.26%	▼9.76
Registered electors		11,073		
Turnout		2,420	21.85%	▲8.05
Rejected ballots				
Liberal Democrats hold		Swing	▼4.88	

==== 2000 ====
Thursday, 4th May 2000
Party	Candidate	Votes	%	±%
Liberal Democrats	Paul Clein	935	59.78%	▼1.02
Labour	K. McNerney	403	25.77%	▼4.27
Green	Donald Ross	127	8.12%	▲3.20
Conservative	Ann Nugent	68	4.35%	▲0.11
Liberal	W. Grace	31	1.98%	Steady
Majority		532	34.02%	▲3.25
Registered electors		11,330		
Turnout		1,564	13.80%	▼5.18
Rejected ballots				
Liberal Democrats hold		Swing	▲1.62	

=== Elections of the 1990s ===
==== 1999 ====
Thursday, 6th May 1999
Party	Candidate	Votes	%	±%
Liberal Democrats	Mirna Juarez	1,334	60.80%	▲2.76
Labour	C. Evans	659	30.04%	▼2.36
Green	Donald Ross	108	4.92%	Steady
Conservative	Ann Nugent	93	4.24%	▲0.95
Majority		675	30.77%	▲5.12
Registered electors		11,559		
Turnout		2,194	18.98%	▲0.46
Rejected ballots				
Liberal Democrats gain from Labour		Swing	▲2.56	

==== 1998 ====
Thursday, 7th May 1998
Party	Candidate	Votes	%	±%
Liberal Democrats	Jan Clein	1,324	58.04%	▲12.18
Labour	Hillary Burrage	739	32.40%	▼11.69
Socialist Labour	Robert Foulkes	143	6.27%	Steady
Conservative	Diane Watson	75	3.29%	▼1.02
Majority		585	25.65%	▲23.87
Registered electors		12,315		
Turnout		2,281	18.52%	▼8.91
Rejected ballots				
Liberal Democrats hold		Swing	▲11.94	

==== 1996 ====
Thursday, 2nd May 1996
Party	Candidate	Votes	%	±%
Liberal Democrats	Paul Clein	1,448	45.87%	▲5.52
Labour	R. Gladden	1,392	44.09%	▼6.28
Green	Donald Ross	181	5.73%	▲0.66
Conservative	K. Watkin	136	4.31%	▲0.10
Majority		56	1.77%	▼8.26
Registered electors		11,510		
Turnout		3,157	27.43%	▼2.26
Rejected ballots				
Liberal Democrats hold		Swing	▲5.90	

==== 1995 ====
Thursday, 4th May 1995
Party	Candidate	Votes	%	±%
Labour	Paul Brant	1,677	50.38%	▲6.70
Liberal Democrats	Roger Johnston	1,343	40.34%	▼4.35
Green	A. Willan	169	5.08%	▲1.37
Conservative	K. Edwards	140	4.21%	▲0.09
Majority		334	10.03%	▲9.02
Registered electors		11,214		
Turnout		3,329	29.69%	▼3.00
Rejected ballots				
Labour gain from Liberal Democrats		Swing	▲5.52	

==== 1994 ====
Thursday, 5th May 1994
Party	Candidate	Votes	%	±%
Liberal Democrats	Jan Clein	1,628	44.69%	▲7.03
Labour	A. Cleary	1,591	43.67%	▲9.18
Conservative	K. Edwards	150	4.12%	▼6.40
Liberal	D. Jones	139	3.82%	Steady
Green	Ms L. Lever	135	3.71%	▼4.68
Majority		37	1.02%	▼2.15
Registered electors		11,144		
Turnout		3,643	32.69%	▲5.65
Rejected ballots				
Liberal Democrats gain from Labour		Swing	▼1.07	

==== 1992 ====
Thursday, 7th May 1992
Party	Candidate	Votes	%	±%
Liberal Democrats	Paul Clein	1,167	37.66%	▼8.58
Labour	M. Victoria Roberts	1,069	34.49%	▲1.48
Conservative	Carols Zsigmond	326	10.52%	▲3.22
Green	J. Hulton	260	8.39%	▼2.79
Independent	J. Stancer	259	8.36%	Steady
SDP	D. Pollard	18	0.58%	▼0.44
Majority		98	3.16%	▼10.06
Registered electors		11,459		
Turnout		3,099	27.04%	▼5.03
Rejected ballots				
Liberal Democrats gain from Labour		Swing	▲12.83	

==== 1991 ====
Thursday, 2nd May 1991
Party	Candidate	Votes	%	±%
Liberal Democrats	Roger Johnston	1,812	46.24%	▲6.7
Labour	P. Tyrell	1,294	33.02%	▼18.95
Green	W. Jenkins	438	11.18%	Steady
Conservative	A. Zsigmond	286	7.30%	▲0.44
Independent	S. Maidment	49	1.25%	Steady
SDP	Ms V. Gould	40	1.02%	Steady
Majority		518	13.22%	▲0.80
Registered electors		11,114		
Turnout		3,919	35.26%	▼3.09
Rejected ballots				
Liberal Democrats hold		Swing	▲9.47	

==== 1990 ====
Thursday, 3rd May 1990
Party	Candidate	Votes	%	±%
Labour	Andrew Duckworth	2,234	51.97%	▼0.41
SLD	Mary Johnston	1,700	39.54%	▲5.25
Conservative	D.W. Patmore	295	6.86%	▼0.75
Independent	D.E. Huish	70	1.63%	Steady
Majority		534	12.42%	▼5.66
Registered electors		11,209		
Turnout		4,299	38.35%	▼2.20
Rejected ballots				
Labour gain from Alliance		Swing	▼2.83	

=== Elections of the 1980s ===
==== 1988 ====
Thursday, 5th May 1988
Party	Candidate	Votes	%	±%
Labour	M. Victoria Roberts	2,381	52.38%	▲15.18
SLD	B. Grocott	1,559	34.29%	Steady
Conservative	D.W. Patmore	346	7.61%	▲0.01
Green	G. Thomson	213	4.69%	▲1.21
Communist	J. Crawley	47	1.03%	Steady
Majority		822	18.08%	▲3.55
Registered electors		11,209		
Turnout		4,546	40.56%	▼4.22
Rejected ballots				
Labour gain from Alliance		Swing	▲7.59	

==== 1987 ====
Thursday, 7th May 1987
Party	Candidate	Votes	%	±%
Alliance	Roger Johnston	2,709	51.73%	▲1.04
Labour	D.J. Bermingham	1,948	37.20%	▲1.28
Conservative	D.W. Patmore	398	7.60%	▼1.31
Green	G. Thomson	182	3.48%	▲0.19
Majority		761	14.53%	▼0.24
Registered electors		11,695		
Turnout		5,237	44.78%	▲2.31
Rejected ballots				
Alliance gain from Labour		Swing	▼0.12	

==== 1986 ====
Thursday, 8th May 1986
Party	Candidate	Votes	%	±%
Alliance	Mary Johnston	2,560	50.69%	▲7.89
Labour	K. Feintuck	1,814	35.92%	▼5.64
Conservative	Steve Fitzsimmons	450	8.91%	▼5.60
Green	G. Thomson	166	3.29%	Steady
Communist	Jack Kay	60	1.19%	▲0.07
Majority		746	14.77%	▲13.53
Registered electors		11,891		
Turnout		5,050	42.47%	▼3.89
Rejected ballots				
Alliance hold		Swing	▲6.76	

==== 1984 ====
Thursday, 3rd May 1984
Party	Candidate	Votes	%	±%
Alliance	S.J. Hicks	2,404	42.81%	▲3.24
Labour	M.Victoria Roberts	2,334	41.56%	▲1.99
Conservative	Helen Margaret Rigby	815	14.51%	▼4.25
Communist	J.C. Blevin	63	1.12%	▼0.08
Majority		70	1.25%	▲0.12
Registered electors		12,114		
Turnout		5,616	46.36%	▲3.59
Rejected ballots				
Alliance hold		Swing	▼1.00	

==== 1983 ====
Thursday, 5th May 1983
Party	Candidate	Votes	%	±%
Labour	Julie Lyon-Taylor	2,075	39.57%	▲3.40
Liberal	S. Hicks	2,016	38.44%	▼0.42
Conservative	Helen Margaret Rigby	984	18.76%	▼4.65
SDP	G. Endicott	106	2.02%	Steady
Communist	J.C. Blevin	63	1.20%	▼0.36
Majority		59	1.13%	▼1.56
Registered electors		12,262		
Turnout		5,244	42.77%	▲6.84
Rejected ballots				
Labour hold		Swing	▲1.70	

==== 1982 ====
Thursday, 6th May 1982
Party	Candidate	Votes	%	±%
Alliance	Mary Johnston	1,693	38.86%	▲2.78
Labour	A.C. Snowden	1,576	36.17%	▲2.20
Conservative	Helen Margaret Rigby	1,020	23.41%	▼3.47
Communist	Jack Kay	68	1.56%	▼1.51
Majority		117	2.69%	▲0.58
Registered electors		12,127		
Turnout		4,357	35.93%	▼1.44
Rejected ballots				
Alliance gain from Labour		Swing	▼1.10	

==== 1980 ====
Tuesday, 6th May 1980 (3 seats)
Party	Candidate	Votes	%	±%
Liberal	Charles Hutchinson	1,678	36.08%	▲4.63
Labour	Julie Lyon-Taylor	1,580	33.97%	▼1.57
Labour	Patrick Grannell	1,536		▼
Liberal	John Hemmingway	1,508		▲
Liberal	Roger Johnston	1,506		▲
Labour	Ian George Williams	1,463		▼
Conservative	Ronald Spencer Fairclough	1,250	26.88%	▼6.13
Conservative	Donald Malcolm Green	1,166		▼
Conservative	Helen Margaret Rigby	1,049		▼
Communist	Rosita Marc	143	3.07%	Steady
Majority		98	2.11%	▼0.43
Registered electors		12,446		
Turnout		4,651	37.37%	▼23.86
Rejected ballots				
Liberal hold		Swing		
Labour hold		Swing		
Labour gain from Conservative		Swing		

==== 1979 ====
Thursday, 3rd May 1979
Party	Candidate	Votes	%	±%
Labour	Julie Lyon-Taylor	2,769	35.55%	▲8.77
Conservative	J.C. Shaw	2,571	33.00%	▼3.39
Liberal	J.G. Morgan	2,450	31.45%	▼1.60
Majority		198	2.54%	▼0.79
Registered electors		12,722		
Turnout		7,790	61.23%	▲32.02
Rejected ballots				
Labour gain from Liberal		Swing	▲6.08	

=== Elections of the 1970s ===
==== 1978 ====
Thursday, 4th May 1978
Party	Candidate	Votes	%	±%
Conservative	Ronald Spencer Fairclough	1,397	36.39%	▲7.40
Liberal	P.H. Hodgson	1,269	33.06%	▼11.03
Labour	J. McLean	1,028	26.78%	▼0.15
Communist	Jack Kay	145	3.78%	Steady
Majority		128	3.33%	▼11.76
Registered electors		13,140		
Turnout		3,839	29.22%	▼0.32
Rejected ballots				
Conservative gain from Liberal		Swing	▲9.22	

==== 1976 ====
Thursday, 6th May 1976
Party	Candidate	Votes	%	±%
Liberal	Charles Hutchinson	1,781	44.08%	▼2.73
Conservative	R.M. Amyes	1,171	28.99%	▲0.62
Labour	F.S. Roderick	1,088	26.93%	▲2.12
Majority		610	15.10%	▼3.35
Registered electors		13,680		
Turnout		4,040	29.53%	▲3.82
Rejected ballots				
Liberal hold		Swing	▼1.68	

==== 1975 ====
Thursday, 1st May 1975
Party	Candidate	Votes	%	±%
Liberal	K.L. Rainford	1,700	46.82%	▼13.65
Conservative	R.M. Amyes	1,030	28.37%	▲9.48
Labour	F.S. Roderick	901	24.81%	▲4.16
Majority		670	18.45%	▼21.36
Registered electors		14,119		
Turnout		3,631	25.72%	▼1.73
Rejected ballots				
Liberal hold		Swing	▼11.56	

==== 1973 ====
Thursday, 10th May 1973 (3 seats)
Party	Candidate	Votes	%	±%
Liberal	N. Wood	2,395	60.46%	▲16.15
Liberal	Charles Hutchinson	2,230		▲
Liberal	K. Rainford	2,202		▲
Labour	A.E. Janes	818	20.65%	▼6.07
Labour	D. Jones	795		▼
Labour	P.V. Wall	788	%	▼
Conservative	Ronald Spencer Fairclough	748	18.88%	▼10.08
Conservative	M. Kingston	736		▼
Conservative	E.W. Mossford	731		▼
Majority		1577	39.81%	▲24.46
Registered electors		14,434		
Turnout		3,961	27.44%	▼5.35
Rejected ballots				
Liberal hold		Swing		
Liberal hold		Swing		
Liberal gain from Conservative		Swing		

==== 1972 ====
Wednesday, 3rd May 1972
Party	Candidate	Votes	%	±%
Liberal	Charles Hutchinson	2,093	44.32%	▼3.54
Conservative	Kevin W. Edwards	1,368	28.96%	▲1.50
Labour	A.L. Jones	1,262	26.72%	▲2.04
Majority		725	15.35%	▼5.05
Registered electors		14,405		
Turnout		4,723	32.79%	▼0.31
Rejected ballots				
Liberal gain from Conservative		Swing	▼2.52	

==== 1971 ====
Thursday, 13th May 1971
Party	Candidate	Votes	%	±%
Liberal	N. Wood	2,236	47.86%	Steady
Conservative	A.J. Browne	1,283	27.46%	▼34.57
Labour	C. O'Rourke	1,153	24.68%	▼10.85
Majority		953	20.40%	▼6.11
Registered electors		14,116		
Turnout		4,672	33.10%	▲2.51
Rejected ballots				
Liberal gain from Conservative		Swing	▲17.29	

==== 1970 ====
Thursday, 7th May 1970
Party	Candidate	Votes	%	±%
Conservative	John E. Kendrick	2,621	62.04%	▲1.25
Labour	M. Evans	1,501	35.53%	▲21.99
Communist	Jack Kay	103	2.44%	▼0.87
Majority		1120	26.51%	▼15.21
Registered electors		13,815		
Turnout		4,225	30.58%	▼0.74
Rejected ballots				
Conservative hold		Swing	▼10.37	

=== Elections of the 1960s ===
==== 1969 ====
Thursday, 8th May 1969
Party	Candidate	Votes	%	±%
Conservative	Kevin W. Edwards	2,331	60.78%	▼11.27
Liberal	Leonard Tyrer	731	19.06%	▲7.28
Labour	Mrs Mabel Evans	519	13.53%	▲0.89
Communist	Jack Kay	127	3.31%	▼0.21
National Front	Eric Tomlinson	127	3.31%	Steady
Majority		1600	41.72%	▼17.68
Registered electors		12,245		
Turnout		3,835	31.32%	▲3.17
Rejected ballots				
Conservative hold		Swing	▼9.27	

==== 1968 ====
Thursday, 9th May 1968
Party	Candidate	Votes	%	±%
Conservative	Clifford Price	2,495	72.05%	▲2.96
Labour	Stanley G. Thorne	438	12.65%	▼15.01
Liberal	Edward J. Kennedy	408	11.78%	Steady
Communist	Jack Kay	122	3.52%	▲0.26
Majority		2057	59.40%	▲17.97
Registered electors		12,301		
Turnout		3,463	28.15%	▼5.43
Rejected ballots				
Conservative hold		Swing	▲8.99	

==== 1967 ====
Thursday, 11th May 1967
Party	Candidate	Votes	%	±%
Conservative	John E. Kendrick	2,840	69.08%	▲5.36
Labour	Joseph Cloherty	1,137	27.66%	▼6.49
Communist	Jack Kay	134	3.26%	▲1.13
Majority		1703	41.43%	▲11.85
Registered electors		12,243		
Turnout		4,111	33.58%	▲4.83
Rejected ballots				
Conservative hold		Swing	▲5.93	

==== 1966 ====
Thursday, 12th May 1966
Party	Candidate	Votes	%	±%
Conservative	Kevin W. Edwards	2,243	63.72%	▲0.57
Labour	Joseph Cloherty	1,202	34.15%	▼0.00
Communist	Jack Kay	75	2.13%	▼0.57
Majority		1041	29.57%	▲0.58
Registered electors		12,243		
Turnout		3,520	28.75%	▼5.74
Rejected ballots				
Conservative hold		Swing	▲0.29	

==== 1965 ====
Thursday, 13th May 1965
Party	Candidate	Votes	%	±%
Conservative	Clifford Price	2,598	63.15%	▲14.72
Labour	Mrs G.J. Mathison	1,405	34.15%	▼1.09
Communist	Jack Kay	111	2.70%	▲0.63
Majority		1193	29.00%	▲15.81
Registered electors		11,928		
Turnout		4,114	34.49%	▼2.64
Rejected ballots				
Conservative hold		Swing	▲7.90	

==== 1964 ====
Thursday, 7th May 1964
Party	Candidate	Votes	%	±%
Conservative	John E. Kendrick	2,225	48.43%	▲6.04
Labour	T. Roberts	1,619	35.24%	▼5.03
Liberal	P.J. Goddard	560	12.19%	▼3.63
Communist	Jack Kay	95	2.07%	▲0.54
Independent	R.H. Richardson	95	2.07%	Steady
Majority		606	13.19%	▲11.07
Registered electors		12,373		
Turnout		4,594	37.13%	▼5.95
Rejected ballots				
Conservative hold		Swing	▲5.53	

==== 1963 ====
Thursday, 9th May 1963
Party	Candidate	Votes	%	±%
Conservative	P.W. Rathbone	2,278	42.39%	▲1.21
Labour	C. Taylor	2,164	40.27%	▲6.27
Liberal	I. Gottlieb	850	15.82%	▼7.42
Communist	Jack Kay	82	1.53%	▼0.07
Majority		114	2.12%	▼5.07
Registered electors		12,476		
Turnout		5,374	43.07%	▲1.42
Rejected ballots				
Conservative hold		Swing	▼2.53	

==== 1962 ====
Thursday, 10th May 1962
Party	Candidate	Votes	%	±%
Conservative	Clifford Price	2,143	41.18%	▼17.91
Labour	C. Taylor	1,769	33.99%	▲12.69
Liberal	I. Gottlieb	1,209	23.23%	▲6.92
Communist	Jack Kay	83	1.59%	▼1.70
Majority		374	7.19%	▼30.59
Registered electors		12,494		
Turnout		5,204	41.65%	▲6.78
Rejected ballots				
Conservative hold		Swing	▼15.30	

==== 1961 ====
Thursday, 11th May 1961
Party	Candidate	Votes	%	±%
Conservative	Harold Lees	2,546	59.09%	▼4.91
Labour	Patrick Grannell	918	21.30%	▼0.91
Liberal	R.M. Bale	703	16.31%	▲5.26
Communist	Jack Kay	142	3.30%	▲0.57
Majority		1628	37.78%	▼4.00
Registered electors		12,358		
Turnout		4,309	34.87%	▲3.06
Rejected ballots				
Conservative hold		Swing	▼2.00	

==== 1960 ====
Thursday, 12th May 1960
Party	Candidate	Votes	%	±%
Conservative	P.W. Rathbone	2,535	64.00%	▼1.39
Labour	G.C. Carr	880	22.22%	▼8.38
Liberal	Mrs B.A. Hands	438	11.06%	Steady
Communist	Jack Kay	108	2.73%	▼1.28
Majority		1655	41.78%	▲6.99
Registered electors		12,454		
Turnout		3,961	31.81%	▼4.03
Rejected ballots				
Conservative hold		Swing	▲3.50	

=== Elections of the 1950s ===
==== 1959 ====
Thursday, 7th May 1959
Party	Candidate	Votes	%	±%
Conservative	Clifford Price	2,936	65.39%	▲8.44
Labour	J.M. Burke	1,374	30.60%	▼9.01
Communist	Jack Kay	180	4.01%	▲0.56
Majority		1562	34.79%	▲17.45
Registered electors		12,531		
Turnout		4,490	35.83%	▲0.17
Rejected ballots				
Conservative hold		Swing	▲8.73	

==== 1958 ====
Thursday, 8th May 1958
Party	Candidate	Votes	%	±%
Conservative	Harold Lees	2,562	56.95%	▼6.60
Labour	John E. McPherson	1,782	39.61%	▲5.06
Communist	Jack Kay	155	3.45%	▲1.55
Majority		780	17.34%	▼11.66
Registered electors		12,615		
Turnout		4,499	35.66%	▼4.31
Rejected ballots				
Conservative hold		Swing	▼5.83	

==== 1957 ====
Thursday, 9th May 1957
Party	Candidate	Votes	%	±%
Conservative	P.W. Rathbone	3,246	63.55%	▲7.82
Labour	F.D. Shemmonds	1,765	34.55%	▼6.69
Communist	Jack Kay	97	1.90%	▼1.13
Majority		1481	28.99%	▲14.51
Registered electors		12,779		
Turnout		5,108	39.97%	▲7.41
Rejected ballots				
Conservative hold		Swing	▲7.25	

==== 1956 ====
Thursday, 10th May 1956
Party	Candidate	Votes	%	±%
Conservative	W.I. Throssell	2,358	55.73%	▼16.09
Labour	F.D. Shemmonds	1,745	41.24%	▲13.06
Communist	Jack Kay	128	3.03%	Steady
Majority		613	14.49%	▼29.15
Registered electors		12,993		
Turnout		4,231	32.56%	▼5.53
Rejected ballots				
Conservative hold		Swing	▼14.58	

==== 1955 ====
Thursday, 12th May 1955
Party	Candidate	Votes	%	±%
Conservative	Harold Lees	3,660	71.82%	▲6.23
Labour	J. Palliser	1,436	28.18%	▼6.23
Majority		2224	43.64%	▲12.47
Registered electors		13,376		
Turnout		5,096	38.10%	▲0.91
Rejected ballots				
Conservative hold		Swing	▲6.23	

==== 1954 ====
Thursday, 13th May 1954
Party	Candidate	Votes	%	±%
Conservative	J.N.M. Entwistle	3,238	65.59%	▲1.65
Labour	B. Deane	1,699	34.41%	▼1.65
Majority		1539	31.17%	▲3.29
Registered electors		13,276		
Turnout		4,937	37.19%	▼7.10
Rejected ballots				
Conservative hold		Swing	▲1.65	

==== 1953 ====
Thursday, 7th May 1953 (3 seats)
Party	Candidate	Votes	%	±%
Conservative	W.I. Throssell	3,782	63.94%	
Conservative	Harold Lees	3,714	62.79%	
Conservative	J.N.M. Entwistle	3,627	61.32%	
Labour	A. Young	2,133	36.06%	
Labour	T. McManus	2,113	35.72%	
Labour	E.N. Mannheim	2,085	35.25%	
Majority		1649	27.88%	
Registered electors		13,355		
Turnout		5,915	44.29%	
Rejected ballots				
Conservative hold		Swing		
Conservative hold		Swing		
Conservative hold		Swing		
