= 1969 Liverpool City Council election =

1969 UK local election

← 1968	8 May 1969	1970 →
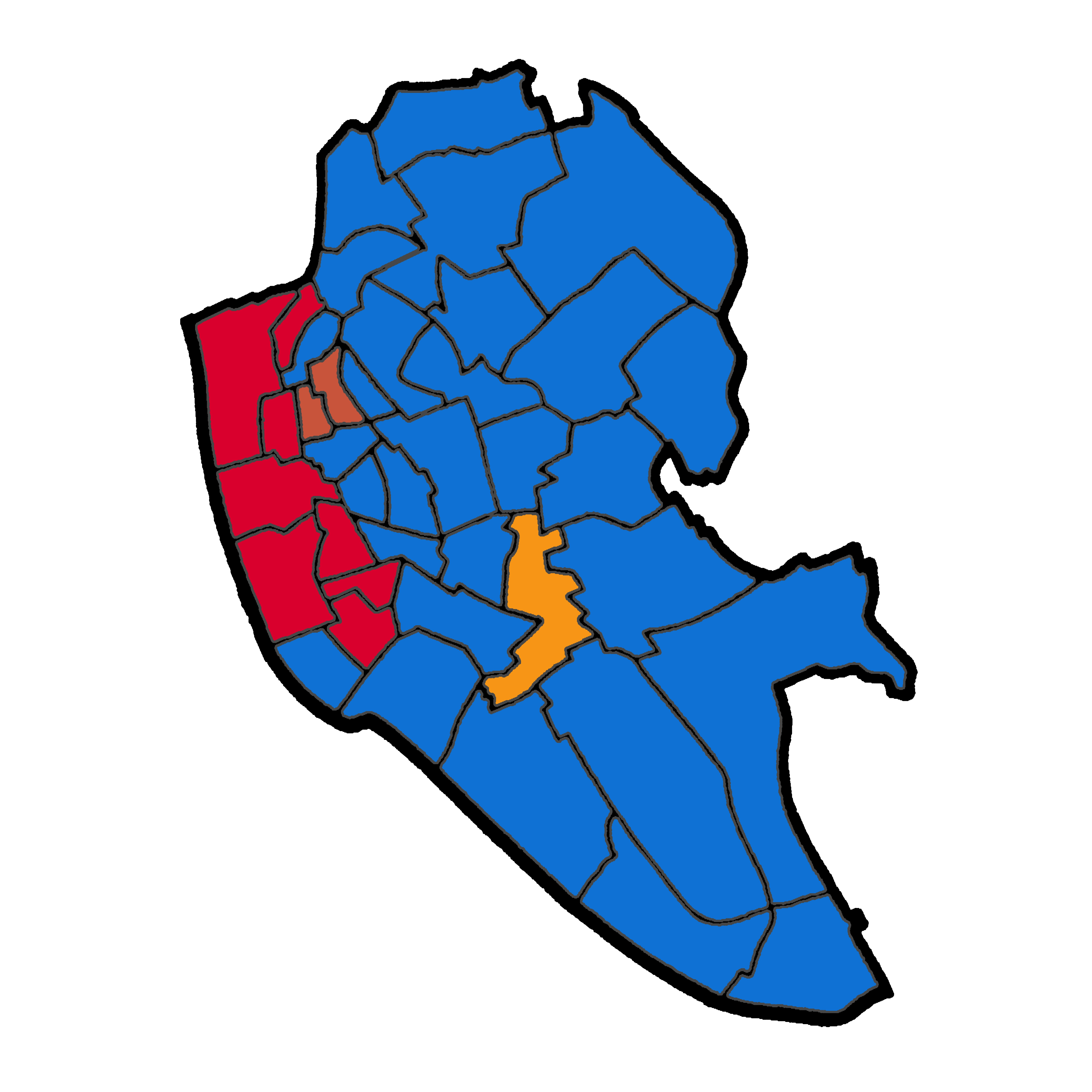
- Map of Liverpool showing wards won (first placed party)

Elections to Liverpool City Council were held on 8 May 1969.

After the election, the composition of the council was:

Party	Councillors	±	Aldermen
Conservative	87	+9	??
Labour	23	-10	??
Liberal	3	+1	??
Protestant	7	0	??

== Election result ==
Liverpool local election result 1969
Party	Seats	Gains	Losses	Net gain/loss	Seats %	Votes %	Votes	+/−
Conservative	29	11	2	+9	72%	60%	76,255	
Labour	8	1	11	-10	20%	28%	35,402	
Liberal	1	1	0	+1	2.5%	8%	9,974	
Protestant	2	0	0	0	5%	1.5%	1,889	
Communist	0	0	0	0	0%	1.8%	2,275	
National Front	0	0	0	0	0%	0.43%	551	

== Ward results ==
* - Councillor seeking re-election

^{(PARTY)} - Party of former Councillor

The Councillors seeking re-election at this election were elected in 1966 for a three-year term, therefore comparisons are made with the 1966 election results.

=== Abercromby ===
Abercromby
Party	Candidate	Votes	%	±%
Labour	William F. Burke *	515	44%	−15%
Conservative	Stanley V. Hennessy	449	39%	+7%
Communist	Anthony McClelland	158	14%	+5%
National Front	Elvyn Thompson	39	3%	
Majority		66		
Registered electors		5,557		
Turnout		1,161	21%	+4%
Labour hold		Swing		

=== Aigburth ===
Aigburth
Party	Candidate	Votes	%	±%
Conservative	Sydney T. Moss ^{(PARTY)}	4,429	92%	+20%
Labour	Andrew Williams	394	8%	0%
Majority		4,035		
Registered electors		13,462		
Turnout		4,823	36%	0%
Conservative hold		Swing		

=== Allerton ===
Allerton
Party	Candidate	Votes	%	±%
Conservative	David E. Williams *	2,723	70%	+2%
Liberal	Miss Jean E. Freeman	880	23%	+1%
Labour	Frank W. Longworth	292	7%	−3%
Majority		1,843		
Registered electors		9,950		
Turnout		3,895	39%	+5%
Conservative hold		Swing		

=== Anfield ===
Anfield
Party	Candidate	Votes	%	±%
Conservative	Robert G. Semple *	2,897	76%	+13%
Labour	John D. Hamilton	913	24%	−13%
Majority		2,431		
Registered electors		12,894		
Turnout		3,810	30%	−1%
Conservative hold		Swing		

=== Arundel ===
Arundel
Party	Candidate	Votes	%	±%
Conservative	Kevin W. Edwards *	2,331	62%	−2%
Liberal	Leonard Tyrer	731	19%	+19%
Labour	Mrs. Mabel Evans	519	14%	−20%
Communist	Jack Kay	127	3%	+1%
National Front	Eric Tomlinson	127	3%	+1%
Majority		1,600		
Registered electors		12,245		
Turnout		3,766	31%	+2%
Conservative hold		Swing		

=== Breckfield ===
Breckfield
Party	Candidate	Votes	%	±%
Conservative	Michael W. Maxwell	1,552	54%	+6%
Labour	Len Williams *	801	28%	−24%
Liberal	Michael V. Lilley	508	18%	+18%
Majority		751		
Registered electors		9,617		
Turnout		2,861	30%	+6%
Conservative gain from Labour		Swing		

=== Broadgreen ===
Broadgreen
Party	Candidate	Votes	%	±%
Conservative	Daniel J. Jones	1,913	57%	−9%
Liberal	Thomas R. W. Johnston	1,016	30%	+19%
Labour	Michael Black ^{(PARTY)}	429	13%	−10%
Majority		897		
Registered electors		10,893		
Turnout		3,358	31%	+1%
Conservative hold		Swing		

=== Central ===
Central
Party	Candidate	Votes	%	±%
Labour	George G. Maloney	1,226	49%	0%
Conservative	Barry V. Groombridge	1,216	49%	−2%
Communist	Thomas R. Woods	57	2%	+2%
Majority		10		
Registered electors		6,946		
Turnout		2,499	36%	−10%
Labour gain from Conservative		Swing		

=== Childwall ===
Childwall
Party	Candidate	Votes	%	±%
Conservative	Frank H. Andrews ^{(PARTY)}	4,405	73%	+22%
Liberal	Harry Davies	1,108	18%	−21%
Labour	Anthony Mulhearn	407	7%	−1%
Majority		3,297		
Registered electors		17,336		
Turnout		6,044	35%	+9%
Conservative hold		Swing		

=== Church ===
Church
Party	Candidate	Votes	%	±%
Liberal	Reginald F. Atkins	3,573	55%	+13%
Conservative	Herbert R. Balmer	2,761	42%	−10%
Labour	Charles H. Winter	179	3%	−2%
Majority		812		
Registered electors		13,463		
Turnout		6,513	48%	+7%
Liberal gain from Conservative		Swing		

=== Clubmoor ===
Clubmoor
Party	Candidate	Votes	%	±%
Conservative	Ernest Johnson *	2,273	62%	+4%
Labour	Kenneth Stewart	1,383	38%	−4%
Majority		890		
Registered electors		10,285		
Turnout		3,656	36%	+2%
Conservative hold		Swing		

=== County ===
County
Party	Candidate	Votes	%	±%
Conservative	William Thomas *	2,760	67%	+15%
Labour	Terence Roberts	1,093	27%	−21%
Communist	Kenneth T. Dowd	251	6%	+6%
Majority		1,667		
Registered electors		12,643		
Turnout		4,104	32%	0%
Conservative hold		Swing		

=== Croxteth ===
Croxteth
Party	Candidate	Votes	%	±%
Conservative	Alexander L. Audley *	3,457	87%	+8%
Labour	Rodney Ludvigsen	500	13%	−8%
Majority		2,957		
Registered electors		11,765		
Turnout		3,957	34%	−2%
Conservative hold		Swing		

=== Dingle ===
Dingle
Party	Candidate	Votes	%	±%
Conservative	John H. Lea	1,655	49%	+10%
Labour	Daniel Cumella *	1,485	44%	−17%
Communist	John Cook	134	4%	+4%
National Front	Douglas H. Kewley	76	2%	+2%
Majority		170		
Registered electors		10,291		
Turnout		3,350	33%	+5%
Conservative gain from Labour		Swing		

=== Dovecot ===
Dovecot
Party	Candidate	Votes	%	±%
Conservative	John L. Walsh *	2,307	57%	+7%
Labour	Wilfred P. Johnson	1,725	43%	−7%
Majority		582		
Registered electors		15,266		
Turnout		4,032	26%	+1%
Conservative hold		Swing		

=== Everton ===
Everton
Party	Candidate	Votes	%	±%
Conservative	Ralph S. Charles	388	49%	+21%
Labour	Sydney F. Jacobs	378	47%	−21%
Majority		10		
Registered electors		4,142		
Turnout		795	19%	+7%
Conservative gain from Labour		Swing		

=== Fairfield ===
Fairfield
Party	Candidate	Votes	%	±%
Conservative	George H. Hesketh ^{(PARTY)}	2,101	74%	+15%
Labour	Harold Lee	744	26%	−15%
Majority		1,357		
Registered electors		12,002		
Turnout		2,845	24%	−11%
Conservative hold		Swing		

=== Fazakerley ===
Fazakerley
Party	Candidate	Votes	%	±%
Conservative	Alan Lloyd *	2,498	76%	+19%
Labour	James M. Burke	802	24%	−19%
Majority		1,696		
Registered electors		10,968		
Turnout		3,300	30%	−5%
Conservative hold		Swing		

=== Gillmoss ===
Gillmoss
Party	Candidate	Votes	%	±%
Conservative	George Smith	2,090	50%	+16%
Labour	John F. Stevens *	1,850	44%	−22%
Communist	John B. Cartwright	239	6%	+6%
Majority		240		
Registered electors		17,751		
Turnout		4,179	24%	+6%
Conservative gain from Labour		Swing		

=== Granby ===
Granby
Party	Candidate	Votes	%	±%
Labour	Mrs. Margaret B. Simey *	1,204	50%	−14%
Conservative	David Greenaway	1,098	46%	+14%
Communist	Frederick Gleeson	102	4%	0%
Majority		106		
Registered electors		9,371		
Turnout		2,404	26%	+4%
Labour hold		Swing		

=== Kensington ===
Kensington
Party	Candidate	Votes	%	±%
Conservative	James G. Barrett	1,627	54%	+17%
Labour	Edward Burke	735	25%	−38%
Ind. Labour Party	T. K. Williams *	578	19%	
National Front	William G. Clarkson	49	2%	+2%
Majority		892		
Registered electors		10,465		
Turnout		2,989	29%	+5%
Conservative gain from Labour		Swing		

=== Low Hill ===
Low Hill
Party	Candidate	Votes	%	±%
Conservative	Thomas P. Pink	844	57%	+20%
Labour	George M. Scott	577	39%	−20%
National Front	Richard J. Williams	49	3%	
Majority		267		
Registered electors		5,146		
Turnout		1,470	29%	+7%
Conservative gain from Labour		Swing		

=== Melrose ===
Melrose
Party	Candidate	Votes	%	±%
Labour	Benjamin Shaw ^{(PARTY)}	904	50%	−13%
Conservative	Charles E. Ratcliffe	901	50%	+13%
Majority		3		
Registered electors		7,389		
Turnout		1,805	24%	+8%
Labour hold		Swing		

=== Netherfield ===
Netherfield
Party	Candidate	Votes	%	±%
Protestant	William Owen *	579	70%	+3%
Labour	Edward Loyden	194	23%	−6%
Communist	Frank Cartwright	54	7%	+3%
Majority		385		
Registered electors		3,984		
Turnout		827	21%	+3%
Protestant hold		Swing		

=== Old Swan ===
Old Swan
Party	Candidate	Votes	%	±%
Conservative	Norman F. Derrick *	2,036	45%	−5%
Liberal	Doreen Jones	1,853	41%	+32%
Labour	Stanley G. Thorne	626	14%	−28%
Majority		1,410		
Registered electors		13,091		
Turnout		4,515	34%	+5%
Conservative hold		Swing		

=== Picton ===
Picton
Party	Candidate	Votes	%	±%
Conservative	Thomas Lyrian Hobday *	2,095	62%	+11%
Labour	William R. Snell	1,145	34%	−15%
National Front	Douglas Richardson	155	5%	
Majority		950		
Registered electors		12,183		
Turnout		3,395	28%	0%
Conservative hold		Swing		

=== Pirrie ===
Pirrie
Party	Candidate	Votes	%	±%
Conservative	Ivor P. Balmer	2,600	60%	+11%
Labour	John McLean *	1,768	40%	−11%
Majority		832		
Registered electors		15,445		
Turnout		4,368	28%	+1%
Conservative gain from Labour		Swing		

=== Prince's Park ===
Prince's Park
Party	Candidate	Votes	%	±%
Labour	Dr. Cyril Taylor *	1,655	50%	−7%
Conservative	Robert S. Jones	1,459	44%	+4%
Communist	John Humes	188	6%	+3%
Majority		196		
Registered electors		10,863		
Turnout		3,302	30%	+4%
Labour hold		Swing		

=== Sandhills ===
Sandhills
Party	Candidate	Votes	%	±%
Labour	Vincent P. Hyams ^{(PARTY)}	1,001	60%	−20%
Conservative	Alfred W. Jones	605	36%	+19%
Communist	Robert Cartwright	73	4%	+1%
Majority		396		
Registered electors		6,649		
Turnout		1,679	25%	+4%
Labour hold		Swing		

=== St. Domingo ===
St. Domingo
Party	Candidate	Votes	%	±%
Protestant	Harold W. Blower *	1,310	61%	+7%
Labour	Thomas McManus	763	36%	−10%
Communist	Kenneth Dunlop	74	3%	
Majority		547		
Registered electors		9,181		
Turnout		2,147	23%	+1%
Protestant hold		Swing		

=== St. James ===
St. James
Party	Candidate	Votes	%	±%
Labour	Edward Shields ^{(PARTY)}	1,442	51%	−12%
Conservative	Cyril Smith	711	25%	−1%
Communist	Roger O'Hara	622	22%	+11%
National Front	Kevin Keatley	58	2%	
Majority		731		
Registered electors		8,533		
Turnout		2,833	33%	+17%
Labour hold		Swing		

=== St. Mary's ===
St. Mary's
Party	Candidate	Votes	%	±%
Conservative	Robert E. Lloyd	2,150	68%	+18%
Labour	Patrick Grannell *	1,031	32%	−18%
Majority		1,119		
Registered electors		9,842		
Turnout		3,181	32%	+2%
Conservative gain from Labour		Swing		

=== St. Michael's ===
St. Michael's
Party	Candidate	Votes	%	±%
Conservative	Eric S. Nixon *	2,568	81%	+24%
Labour	Alfonso Samosa	617	19%	−2%
Majority		1,951		
Registered electors		11,265		
Turnout		3,185	28%	−10%
Conservative hold		Swing		

=== Smithdown ===
Smithdown
Party	Candidate	Votes	%	±%
Conservative	James W. Butler	740	54%	+15%
Labour	W. Gibbs *	555	41%	−20%
National Front	Thomas Everall	67	5%	
Majority		185		
Registered electors		7,777		
Turnout		1,362	18%	+3%
Conservative gain from Labour		Swing		

=== Speke ===
Speke
Party	Candidate	Votes	%	±%
Conservative	Edwin M. Clein	1,677	56%	+13%
Labour	Francis J. McConville *	1,317	44%	−13%
Majority		360		
Registered electors		13,603		
Turnout		2,994	22%	+9%
Conservative gain from Labour		Swing		

=== Tuebrook ===
Tuebrook
Party	Candidate	Votes	%	±%
Conservative	Michael P. Tinne *	2,468	70%	+14%
Labour	David M. Mitchell	1,037	30%	−14%
Majority		1,431		
Registered electors		11,265		
Turnout		3,505	31%	−1%
Conservative hold		Swing		

=== Vauxhall ===
Vauxhall
Party	Candidate	Votes	%	±%
Labour	Frank Marsden ^{(PARTY)}	823	68%	−21%
Liberal	James A. Gallagher	305	25%	
Conservative	Peter S. Jones	45	4%	−2%
Communist	Thomas E. Cassin	43	4%	−1%
Majority		518		
Registered electors		6,265		
Turnout		1,216	19%	+9%
Labour hold		Swing		

=== Warbreck ===
Warbreck
Party	Candidate	Votes	%	±%
Conservative	Ralph H. Morris *	2,593	79%	+15%
Labour	Edward T. Mooney	683	21%	−15%
Majority		1,910		
Registered electors		11,676		
Turnout		3,276	28%	0%
Conservative hold		Swing		

=== Westminster ===
Westminster
Party	Candidate	Votes	%	±%
Conservative	James Wareing	1,081	58%	+15%
Labour	James Gardner *	792	42%	−15%
Majority		289		
Registered electors		5,864		
Turnout		1,873		
Conservative gain from Labour		Swing		

=== Woolton ===
Woolton
Party	Candidate	Votes	%	±%
Conservative	James McAllister *	4,752	84%	+9%
Labour	Robert C. Evans	898	16%	
Majority		3,854		
Registered electors		20,849		
Turnout		5,650	27%	−1%
Conservative hold		Swing		
