= 1968 Liverpool City Council election =

1968 UK local election

← 1967	9 May 1968	1969 →
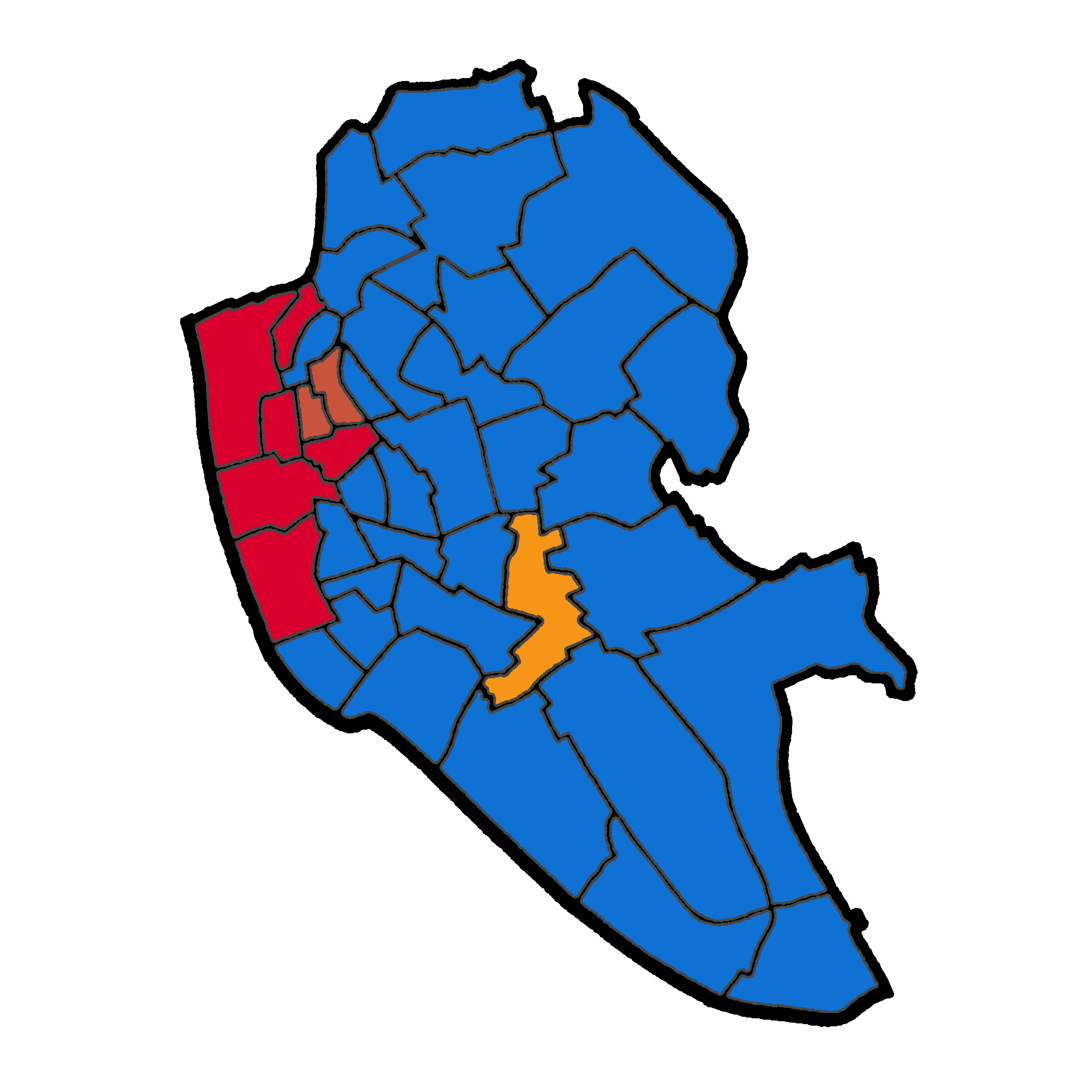
- Map of Liverpool showing wards won (first placed party)

Elections to Liverpool City Council were held on Thursday 9 May 1968.

After the election, the composition of the council was:

Party	Councillors	±	Aldermen
Conservative	79	+12	??
Labour	46	-13	??
Liberal	1	0	??
Protestant	7	+1	??

== Election result ==
Liverpool local election result 1968
Party	Seats	Gains	Losses	Net gain/loss	Seats %	Votes %	Votes	+/−
Conservative	31	12	0	+12	77%	62%	76,088	
Labour	6	0	13	-13	15%	25%	31,198	
Liberal	1	0	0	0	2.5%	10%	11,976	
Protestant	2	1	0	+1	5%	1.3%	1,619	
Communist	0	0	0	0	0%	1.5%	1,792	

== Ward results ==
* - Councillor seeking re-election

^{(PARTY)} - Party of former Councillor

=== Abercromby ===
Abercromby
Party	Candidate	Votes	%	±%
Conservative	David E. Daniel *	483	45%	+15%
Labour	Frank Gaier	470	44%	−19%
Communist	A. M^{c}Clelland	113	11%	−3%
Majority		66		
Registered electors		5,938		
Turnout		1,066	18%	−5%
Conservative gain from Labour		Swing		

=== Aigburth ===
Aigburth
Party	Candidate	Votes	%	±%
Conservative	William N. Venmore *	4,142	69%	−11%
Liberal	Alan G. Wilson	1,679	28%	+16%
Labour	Vincent P. Hyams	208	3%	−6%
Majority		2,463		
Registered electors		13,437		
Turnout		6,029	45%	+6%
Conservative hold		Swing		

=== Allerton ===
Allerton
Party	Candidate	Votes	%	±%
Conservative	Brian F. Evans ^{(PARTY)}	2,982	88%	+19%
Labour	Stanley R. Maddox	412	12%	0%
Majority		2,570		
Registered electors		9,878		
Turnout		3,394	34%	−5%
Conservative hold		Swing		

=== Anfield ===
Anfield
Party	Candidate	Votes	%	±%
Conservative	John Mass ^{(PARTY)}	3,163	80%	+13%
Labour	Rodney Ludvigsen	787	20%	−13%
Majority		2,376		
Registered electors		13,001		
Turnout		3,950	30%	−4%
Conservative hold		Swing		

=== Arundel ===
Arundel
Party	Candidate	Votes	%	±%
Conservative	Clifford Price *	2,495	72%	+9%
Labour	Stanley G. Thorne	438	13%	−21%
Liberal	Edward J. Kennedy	408	12%	
Communist	Jack Kay	122	4%	+1%
Majority		2,057		
Registered electors		12,301		
Turnout		3,463	28%	−6%
Conservative hold		Swing		

=== Breckfield ===
Breckfield
Party	Candidate	Votes	%	±%
Conservative	John K. Tanner *	1,689	71%	+17%
Labour	Andrew Williams	702	29%	−17%
Majority		987		
Registered electors		9,742		
Turnout		2,391	25%	−2%
Conservative hold		Swing		

=== Broadgreen ===
Broadgreen
Party	Candidate	Votes	%	±%
Conservative	Henry Helsall ^{(PARTY)}	2,081	62%	−1%
Labour	John W. Hubble	496	15%	−11%
Majority		1,326		
Registered electors		10,864		
Turnout		3,332	31%	−4%
Conservative hold		Swing		

=== Central ===
Central
Party	Candidate	Votes	%	±%
Labour	James Parry	1,241	51%	−3%
Conservative	Peter R. S. Williams	1,122	46%	0%
Liberal	George C. Hewlett	54	2%	
Communist	John Cook	25	1%	
Majority		119		
Registered electors		7,135		
Turnout		2,442	34%	+7%
Labour hold		Swing		

=== Childwall ===
Childwall
Party	Candidate	Votes	%	±%
Conservative	Charles G. Pascoe *	4,360	64%	−7%
Liberal	Owen Trevor Jones	1,983	29%	+13%
Labour	Tony Mulhearn	338	5%	−7%
Majority		2,377		
Registered electors		17,187		
Turnout		6,772	39%	+3%
Conservative hold		Swing		

=== Church ===
Church
Party	Candidate	Votes	%	±%
Liberal	Cyril E. Carr *	4,458	64%	+14%
Conservative	Mrs. Myra Fitzsimmons	2,316	33%	−11%
Labour	John E. Roberts	191	3%	−3%
Majority		2,142		
Registered electors		13,429		
Turnout		6,965	52%	+4%
Liberal hold		Swing		

=== Clubmoor ===
Clubmoor
Party	Candidate	Votes	%	±%
Conservative	Gordon K. McKelvie *	2,057	63%	+7%
Labour	Ken Stewart	1,226	37%	−7%
Majority		831		
Registered electors		10,400		
Turnout		3,283	32%	−7%
Conservative hold		Swing		

=== County ===
County
Party	Candidate	Votes	%	±%
Conservative	Reginald B. Flude *	2,753	69%	+13%
Labour	George G. Maloney	1,014	25%	−19%
Communist	Kenneth T. Dowd	213	5%	
Majority		1,739		
Registered electors		12,330		
Turnout		3,980	32%	−8%
Conservative hold		Swing		

=== Croxteth ===
Croxteth
Party	Candidate	Votes	%	±%
Conservative	Clarence Dickinson *	3,642	89%	+17%
Labour	Edward Shields	472	11%	−9%
Majority		3,170		
Registered electors		11,805		
Turnout		4,114	35%	−9%
Conservative hold		Swing		

=== Dingle ===
Dingle
Party	Candidate	Votes	%	±%
Conservative	Mrs. Kathleen Prescott	1,706	58%	+13%
Labour	William G. Curtin ^{(PARTY)}	1,086	37%	−18%
Communist	Miss Frances Thompson	125	4%	
Majority		620		
Registered electors		10,521		
Turnout		2.917	28%	0%
Conservative gain from Labour		Swing		

=== Dovecot ===
Dovecot
Party	Candidate	Votes	%	±%
Conservative	Ronald S. Fairclough	2,413	58%	+12%
Labour	Wilfred P. Johnson ^{(PARTY)}	1,755	42%	−12%
Majority		658		
Registered electors		15,407		
Turnout		4,168	27%	−1%
Conservative gain from Labour		Swing		

=== Everton ===
Everton
Party	Candidate	Votes	%	±%
Labour	William Smyth *	520	50%	−13%
Conservative	Douglas G. Deaves	362	34%	+3%
Liberal	Michael V. Lilley	132	13%	+13%
Communist	Robert E. Parry	36	3%	−3%
Majority		158		
Registered electors		6,042		
Turnout		1,050	17%	−1%
Labour hold		Swing		

=== Fairfield ===
Fairfield
Party	Candidate	Votes	%	±%
Conservative	John P. Moyses *	2,225	69%	+4%
Labour	David M. Mitchell	655	21%	−14%
Liberal	Jarlath F. Chambers	329	10%	+10%
Majority		1,560		
Registered electors		12,075		
Turnout		3,219	27%	−2%
Conservative hold		Swing		

=== Fazakerley ===
Fazakerley
Party	Candidate	Votes	%	±%
Conservative	Alexander L. Ritchie *	2,607	75%	+16%
Labour	Kenneth E. Keane	870	25%	−16%
Majority		1,737		
Registered electors		11,075		
Turnout		3,477	31%	−12%
Conservative hold		Swing		

=== Gillmoss ===
Gillmoss
Party	Candidate	Votes	%	±%
Conservative	Mervin Kingston	1,690	49%	+14%
Labour	George E. Delooze *	1,514	44%	−16%
Communist	John B. Cartwright	256	7%	+3%
Majority		176		
Registered electors		16,100		
Turnout		3,460	21%	−3%
Conservative gain from Labour		Swing		

=== Granby ===
Granby
Party	Candidate	Votes	%	±%
Conservative	John J. Swainbank	1,063	45%	+2%
Labour	John D. Hamilton *	797	34%	−18%
Liberal	Mrs. Rosalind M. Craig	390	16%	+16%
Majority		266		
Registered electors		9,830		
Turnout		2,373	24%	+1%
Conservative gain from Labour		Swing		

=== Kensington ===
Kensington
Party	Candidate	Votes	%	±%
Conservative	John N. M. Entwistle	1,913	61%	+15%
Labour	Harry Livermore ^{(PARTY)}	1,239	39%	−15%
Majority		674		
Registered electors		10,831		
Turnout		3,152	29%	+3%
Conservative gain from Labour		Swing		

=== Low Hill ===
Low Hill
Party	Candidate	Votes	%	±%
Conservative	Ernest Crierie	841	59%	+15%
Labour	William R. Snell *	529	37.5%	−15%
Majority		312		
Registered electors		6,180		
Turnout		1,436	23%	+1%
Conservative gain from Labour		Swing		

=== Melrose ===
Melrose
Party	Candidate	Votes	%	±%
Labour	George Ackers *	839	50%	−15%
Conservative	Charles E. Ratcliffe	826	50%	+15%
Majority		13		
Registered electors		7,982		
Turnout		1,665	21%	0%
Labour hold		Swing		

=== Netherfield ===
Netherfield
Party	Candidate	Votes	%	±%
Protestant	James Boardnman ^{(PARTY)}	448	52%	−6%
Labour	John L. Hughes	206	24%	−18%
	Robert D. Jenkins	165	19%	
Communist	Francis J. Cartright	42	5%	+5%
Majority		242		
Registered electors		3,982		
Turnout		861	22%	+1%
Protestant gain from Labour		Swing		

=== Old Swan ===
Old Swan
Party	Candidate	Votes	%	±%
Conservative	Andrew M^{c}Kie Reid *	2,537	75%	−12%
Labour	Eddie Loyden	837	25%	−12%
Majority		1,700		
Registered electors		13.038		
Turnout		3,374	26%	−4%
Conservative hold		Swing		

=== Picton ===
Picton
Party	Candidate	Votes	%	±%
Conservative	Mrs. Ruth Dean *	2,165	61%	+9%
Labour	Tom Bailey	941	26%	−22%
Liberal	Edward C. Hesketh	470	13%	+13%
Majority		1,224		
Registered electors		12,441		
Turnout		3,576	29%	−3%
Conservative hold		Swing		

=== Pirrie ===
Pirrie
Party	Candidate	Votes	%	±%
Conservative	James E. Nicoll	2,568	58%	+13%
Labour	Michael Black *	1,822	42%	−13%
Majority		746		
Registered electors		15,579		
Turnout		4,390	28%	−5%
Conservative gain from Labour		Swing		

=== Prince's Park ===
Prince's Park
Party	Candidate	Votes	%	±%
Conservative	John Cheshire	1,564	55%	+18%
Labour	Terence Roberts	874	31%	−18%
National Front	David T. Jones	174	6%	+6%
Communist	John Humes	135	5%	+2%
Toxteth Nat.	Michael J. Smout	97	3%	+3%
Majority		690		
Registered electors		11,421		
Turnout		2,844	25%	−3%
Conservative gain from Labour		Swing		

=== Sandhills ===
Sandhills
Party	Candidate	Votes	%	±%
Labour	Leo P. Hyams *	903	56%	−26%
Conservative	Frederick Jones	640	40%	+22%
Communist	Robert Cartwright	70	4%	+4%
Majority		263		
Registered electors		6,963		
Turnout		1,613	23%	+1%
Labour hold		Swing		

=== St. Domingo ===
St. Domingo
Party	Candidate	Votes	%	±%
Protestant	Ronald F. Henderson	1,171	48%	−2%
Liberal	Rev. Robert A. Lally	634	26%	+26%
Labour	Frank Marsden	533	22%	−28%
Communist	James P. Hannah	80	3%	+3%
Majority		537		
Registered electors		9,787		
Turnout		2,418	25%	−1%
Protestant hold		Swing		

=== St. James ===
St. James
Party	Candidate	Votes	%	±%
Labour	Owen J. Doyle *	776	52%	−22%
Conservative	Reginald Rendell	392	26%	+8%
Communist	Roger O'Hara	330	22%	+14%
Majority		384		
Registered electors		8,679		
Turnout		1,498	17%	−2%
Labour hold		Swing		

=== St. Mary's ===
St. Mary's
Party	Candidate	Votes	%	±%
Conservative	John Tushingham	2,014	64%	+15%
Labour	Frank W. Longworth *	1,114	36%	−15%
Majority		900		
Registered electors		9,681		
Turnout		3,128	32%	+2%
Conservative gain from Labour		Swing		

=== St. Michael's ===
St. Michael's
Party	Candidate	Votes	%	±%
Conservative	Anthony McVeigh *	2,337	83%	+26%
Labour	Harold Lee	340	12%	−6%
Communist	Michael M^{c}Nally	152	5%	
Majority		1,997		
Registered electors		9,571		
Turnout		2,829	30%	−15%
Conservative hold		Swing		

=== Smithdown ===
Smithdown
Party	Candidate	Votes	%	±%
Conservative	J. M^{c}Dermott	683	69%	+30%
Labour	Thomas C. Greenwood ^{(PARTY)}	387	31%	−30%
Majority		476		
Registered electors		8,924		
Turnout		1,250	14%	−2%
Conservative gain from Labour		Swing		

=== Speke ===
Speke
Party	Candidate	Votes	%	±%
Conservative	Christopher G. Hallows	1,280	50%	+14%
Labour	Thomas Higgins *	1,258	50%	−14%
Majority		22		
Registered electors		13,691		
Turnout		2,538	19%	+3%
Conservative gain from Labour		Swing		

=== Tuebrook ===
Tuebrook
Party	Candidate	Votes	%	±%
Conservative	Rodney M. Amyes *	2,415	72%	+13%
Labour	James Mottram	931	28%	−13%
Majority		1,484		
Registered electors		11,298		
Turnout		3,346	30%	−8%
Conservative hold		Swing		

=== Vauxhall ===
Vauxhall
Party	Candidate	Votes	%	±%
Labour	Anthony Dunford *	430	64%	−21%
Liberal	Francis Quinn	157	24%	+24%
Conservative	Peter S. Jones	50	7%	−3%
Communist	Thomas E. Cassin	31	5%	0%
Majority		273		
Registered electors		6,795		
Turnout		668	10%	−2%
Labour hold		Swing		

=== Warbreck ===
Warbreck
Party	Candidate	Votes	%	±%
Conservative	Davis A. Ritchie *	2,443	68%	+2%
Labour	Edward Mooney	605	17%	−17%
Liberal	George Sephton	527	15%	+15%
Majority		1,838		
Registered electors		11,799		
Turnout		3,575	30%	−6%
Conservative hold		Swing		

=== Westminster ===
Westminster
Party	Candidate	Votes	%	±%
Conservative	William Gilbody *	1,087	58%	+3%
Labour	Edward Burke	774	42%	−3%
Majority		313		
Registered electors		6,117		
Turnout		1,861	30%	+1%
Conservative hold		Swing		

=== Woolton ===
Woolton
Party	Candidate	Votes	%	±%
Conservative	Leslie B. Williams *	4,802	88%	+14%
Labour	James M. Burke	658	12%	−14%
Majority		4,144		
Registered electors		19,373		
Turnout		5,460	28%	−4%
Conservative hold		Swing		
