= 1971 Liverpool City Council election =

1971 UK local election

← 1970	13 May 1971	1972 →

40 seats were up for election (one third): one seat for each of the 40 wards 81 of 120 Councillors and 40 Aldermen seats needed for a majority
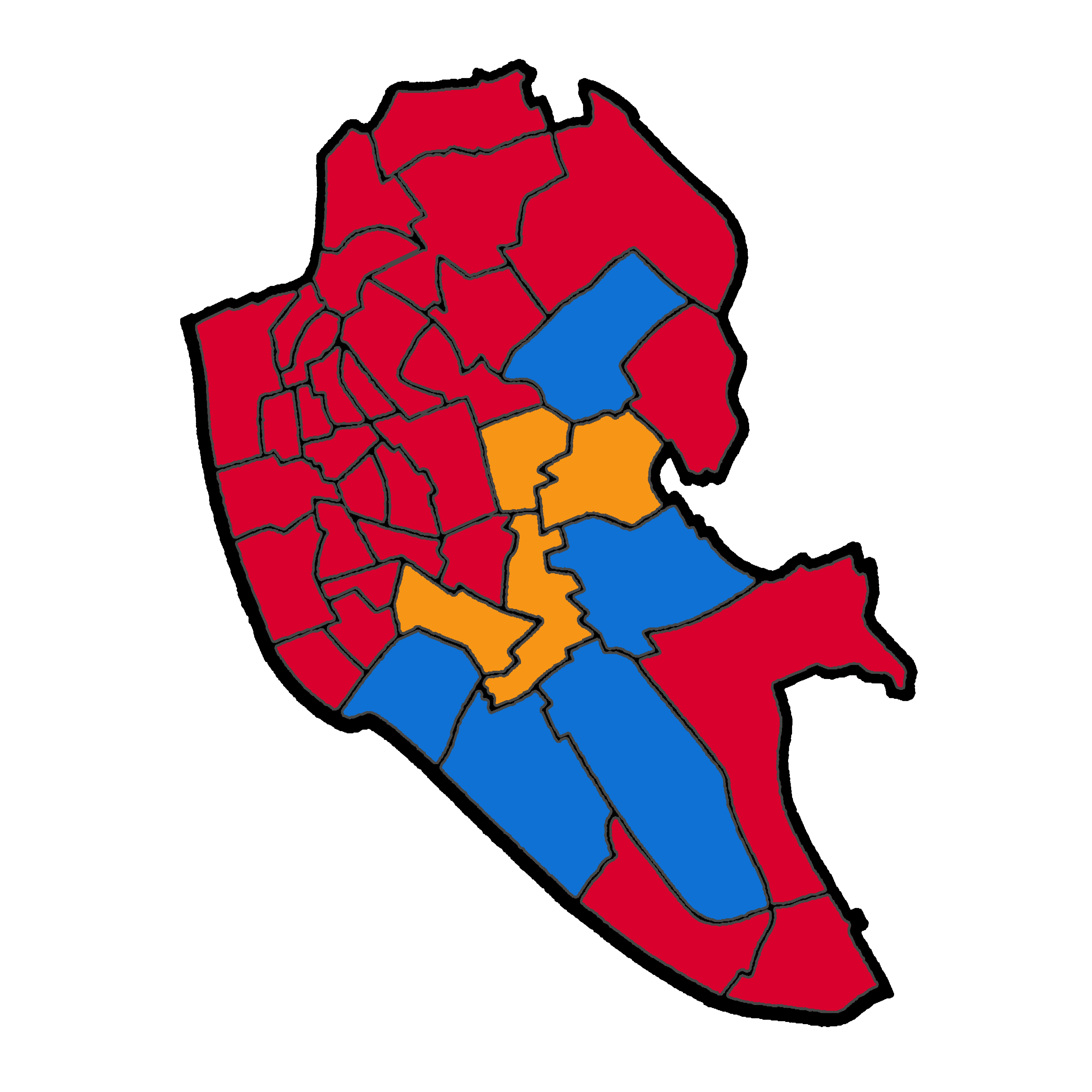
- Map of Liverpool showing wards won (first placed party)

Elections to Liverpool City Council were held on 13 May 1971.

After the election, the composition of the council was:

Party	Councillors	±	Aldermen
Conservative	53	-26	??
Labour	55	+25	??
Liberal	7	+3	??
Protestant	5	-2	??

== Election result ==
Liverpool local election result 1971
Party	Seats	Gains	Losses	Net gain/loss	Seats %	Votes %	Votes	+/−
Labour	31	25	0	+25	77.5%	54%	80,725	
Conservative	5	0	26	-26	12.5%	31%	46,215	
Liberal	4	3	0	+3	10%	13%	18,792	
Communist	0	0	0	0	0%	1%	1,508	
Protestant	0	0	2	-2	0%	0.8%	1,198	

== Ward results ==
This data is compared with the election results for 1968, when the councillors were elected for a three-year term.

* - Councillor seeking re-election

^{(PARTY)} - Party of former Councillor

=== Abercromby ===
Abercromby
Party	Candidate	Votes	%	±%
Labour	S. F. Jacobs	1,038	74%	+30%
Conservative	D. E. Daniel *	287	20%	−25%
Communist	A. McClelland	85	6%	−5%
Majority		751		
Registered electors		5,483		
Turnout		1,410	26%	+8%
Labour gain from Conservative		Swing		

=== Aigburth ===
Aigburth
Party	Candidate	Votes	%	±%
Conservative	H. H. Francis ^{(PARTY)}	3,633	77%	+8%
Labour	G. Walsh	1,058	23%	+20%
Majority		2,575		
Registered electors		14,684		
Turnout		6,029	32%	−13%
Conservative hold		Swing		

=== Allerton ===
Allerton
Party	Candidate	Votes	%	±%
Conservative	B. Evans *	2,300	70%	−18%
Labour	N. J. Dawson	989	30%	+18%
Majority		1,311		
Registered electors		11,000		
Turnout		3,289	30%	−4%
Conservative hold		Swing		

=== Anfield ===
Anfield
Party	Candidate	Votes	%	±%
Labour	F. J. McGurk	2,826	56%	+36%
Conservative	J. Mass *	3,163	38%	−42%
Liberal	F. D. Whaley	338	7%	+7%
Majority		903		
Registered electors		13,519		
Turnout		5,087	38%	+8%
Labour gain from Conservative		Swing		

=== Arundel ===
Arundel
Party	Candidate	Votes	%	±%
Liberal	N. Wood	2,236	47%	+35%
Conservative	A. J. Browne	1,283	27%	−48%
Labour	C. O'Rourke	1,153	24%	+11%
Majority		953		
Registered electors		`14,116		
Turnout		4,748	34%	+7%
Liberal gain from Conservative		Swing		

=== Breckfield ===
Breckfield
Party	Candidate	Votes	%	±%
Labour	L. Williams	1,531	60%	+31%
Conservative	D. J. Lewis ^{(PARTY)}	748	27%	−44%
Liberal	P. Chivall	368	13%	+13%
Majority		893		
Registered electors		8,890		
Turnout		2,757	31%	+6%
Labour gain from Conservative		Swing		

=== Broadgreen ===
Broadgreen
Party	Candidate	Votes	%	±%
Liberal	Roger Johnston	1,905	43%	+20%
Conservative	H. Kelsall *	1,407	32%	−30%
Labour	T. McManus	1,114	25%	+10%
Majority		498		
Registered electors		11,854		
Turnout		4,426	37%	+6%
Liberal gain from Conservative		Swing		

=== Central ===
Central
Party	Candidate	Votes	%	±%
Labour	J. Parry *	1,474	95%	+44%
Conservative	S. V. Hennessy	56	4%	−42%
Communist	R. Cartwright	24	2%	+1%
Majority		1,418		
Registered electors		5,421		
Turnout		1,554	29%	−5%
Labour hold		Swing		

=== Childwall ===
Childwall
Party	Candidate	Votes	%	±%
Conservative	C. G. Pascoe *	3,221	42%	−22%
Liberal	H. Davies	3,186	42%	+13%
Labour	V. Seddon	1,248	16%	+11%
Majority		35		
Registered electors		19,228		
Turnout		7,655	40%	+1%
Conservative hold		Swing		

=== Church ===
Church
Party	Candidate	Votes	%	±%
Liberal	Cyril E. Carr *	3,877	67%	+3%
Conservative	S. P. Mason	1,959	31%	−2%
Labour	K. Jones	468	7%	+4%
Majority		1,918		
Registered electors		14,766		
Turnout		6,304	43%	−9%
Liberal hold		Swing		

=== Clubmoor ===
Clubmoor
Party	Candidate	Votes	%	±%
Labour	J. M. Burke	2,392	57%	+20%
Conservative	A. L. Jones ^{(PARTY)}	1,553	37%	−26%
Liberal	J. Crawford	272	6%	−6%
Majority		839		
Registered electors		11,147		
Turnout		4,217	38%	+6%
Labour gain from Conservative		Swing		

=== County ===
County
Party	Candidate	Votes	%	±%
Labour	J. McLean	2,955	59.08	
Conservative	R. B. Flude *	1,857	37.13	
Communist	K. T. Dowd	190	3.80	
Majority		1,098	21.95	
Registered electors		13,098		
Turnout				
Labour gain from Conservative		Swing		

=== Croxteth ===
Croxteth
Party	Candidate	Votes	%	±%
Conservative	T. Larty ^{(PARTY)}	2,671	60%	−29%
Labour	W. H. Westbury	1,768	40%	+29%
Majority		903		
Registered electors		12,902		
Turnout		4,439	34%	−1%
Conservative hold		Swing		

=== Dingle ===
Dingle
Party	Candidate	Votes	%	±%
Labour	S. W. Jones	2,466	75%	+38%
Conservative	E. W. Mossford ^{(PARTY)}	697	21%	−37%
Communist	J. Cook	111	3%	−1%
Majority		1,769		
Registered electors		9,839		
Turnout		3,274	33%	+5%
Labour gain from Conservative		Swing		

=== Dovecot ===
Dovecot
Party	Candidate	Votes	%	±%
Labour	E. Burke	4,285	78%	+36%
Conservative	R. S. Fairclough *	1,194	22%	−36%
Majority		3,091		
Registered electors		16,448		
Turnout		5,479	33%	+6%
Labour gain from Conservative		Swing		

=== Everton ===
Everton
Party	Candidate	Votes	%	±%
Labour	W. Smythe *	659	83%	+33%
Conservative	E. Bowness	134	17%	−17%
Majority		525		
Registered electors		2,840		
Turnout		793	29%	+12%
Labour hold		Swing		

=== Fairfield ===
Fairfield
Party	Candidate	Votes	%	±%
Labour	D. Hughes	1,811	49%	+28%
Conservative	J. P. Moyses *	1,270	34%	−35%
Liberal	C. Crawford	613	17%	+10%
Majority		541		
Registered electors		11,783		
Turnout		3,694	31%	+4%
Labour gain from Conservative		Swing		

=== Fazakerley ===
Fazakerley
Party	Candidate	Votes	%	±%
Labour	F. Gaier	2,544	60%	+35%
Conservative	A. Ritchie *	1,717	40%	−35%
Majority		827		
Registered electors		11,683		
Turnout		4,261	36%	+5%
Labour gain from Conservative		Swing		

=== Gillmoss ===
Gillmoss
Party	Candidate	Votes	%	±%
Labour	D. Jones	5,163	80%	+36%
Conservative	M. Kingston *	1,122	17%	−32%
Communist	K. Dunlop	137	2%	−5%
Majority		4,041		
Registered electors		20,095		
Turnout		6,422	32%	+11%
Labour gain from Conservative		Swing		

=== Granby ===
Granby
Party	Candidate	Votes	%	±%
Labour	A. Doswell	2,012	75%	+41%
Conservative	J. J. Swainbank *	580	22%	−23%
Communist	J. V. Powell	103	4%	−1%
Majority		1,432		
Registered electors		8,520		
Turnout		2,695	32%	+8%
Labour gain from Conservative		Swing		

=== Kensington ===
Kensington
Party	Candidate	Votes	%	±%
Labour	S. G. Thorne	2,040	59%	+20%
Conservative	J. Entwhistle *	865	25%	−36%
Liberal	I. Parker	529	15%	+15%
Majority		1,175		
Registered electors		10,671		
Turnout		3,434	32%	+3%
Labour gain from Conservative		Swing		

=== Low Hill ===
Low Hill
Party	Candidate	Votes	%	±%
Labour	W. R. Snell	980	64%	+27%
Conservative	E. Crierie *	393	26%	−33%
Liberal	K. Firth	150	10%	+10%
Majority		587		
Registered electors		4,655		
Turnout		1,523	33%	+10%
Labour gain from Conservative		Swing		

=== Melrose ===
Melrose
Party	Candidate	Votes	%	±%
Labour	G. Ackers *	1,837	80%	+30%
Conservative	I. MacFall	460	20%	−30%
Majority		1,377		
Registered electors		7,517		
Turnout		2,297	31%	+10%
Labour hold		Swing		

=== Netherfield ===
Netherfield
Party	Candidate	Votes	%	±%
Labour	J. Mottram	775	57%	+27%
Protestant	J. Boardman *	514	38%	−26%
Liberal	J. J. Hastings	60	4%	+4%
Majority		261		
Registered electors		4,327		
Turnout		1,349	31%	+13%
Labour gain from Protestant		Swing		

=== Old Swan ===
Old Swan
Party	Candidate	Votes	%	±%
Liberal	C. Lyons	2,910	50%	+50%
Labour	T. Roberts	1,547	27%	+2%
Conservative	A. McKie Reid *	1,316	23%	−52%
Majority		1,363		
Registered electors		13,896		
Turnout		5,773	42%	+16%
Liberal gain from Conservative		Swing		

=== Picton ===
Picton
Party	Candidate	Votes	%	±%
Labour	T. Bailey	2,021	43%	+17%
Liberal	J. A. Gallagher	1,652	35%	+22%
Conservative	F. R. Butler ^{(PARTY)}	929	20%	−41%
Communist	J. G. Volleamere	57	1%	
Majority		369		
Registered electors		12,793		
Turnout		4,659	36%	+7%
Labour gain from Conservative		Swing		

=== Pirrie ===
Pirrie
Party	Candidate	Votes	%	±%
Labour	M. Black	4,551	75%	+33%
Conservative	J. F. Atkinson ^{(PARTY)}	1,417	23%	−35%
Communist	B. Anderson	125	2%	
Majority		3,134		
Registered electors		16,587		
Turnout		6,093	37%	+9%
Labour gain from Conservative		Swing		

=== Prince's Park ===
Prince's Park
Party	Candidate	Votes	%	±%
Labour	G. T. Walsh	2,294	72%	+41%
Conservative	J. Cheshire *	789	25%	−30%
Communist	J. F. Greig	114	4%	−1%
Majority		1,505		
Registered electors		8,798		
Turnout		3,197	36%	+11%
Labour gain from Conservative		Swing		

=== Sandhills ===
Sandhills
Party	Candidate	Votes	%	±%
Labour	L. P. Hyams *	1,446	91%	+35%
Conservative	R. Walsh	138	9%	−31%
Majority		1,308		
Registered electors		6,157		
Turnout		1,584	26%	+3%
Labour hold		Swing		

=== St. Domingo ===
St. Domingo
Party	Candidate	Votes	%	±%
Labour	C. McDonald	827	55%	+33%
Protestant	R. F. Henderson *	684	45%	−3%
Majority		143		
Registered electors		6,083		
Turnout		1,511	25%	0%
Labour gain from Protestant		Swing		

=== St. James ===
St. James
Party	Candidate	Votes	%	±%
Labour	O. J. Doyle	2,244	78%	+26%
Communist	R' O'Hara	426	15%	−7%
Conservative	J. Howard	194	7%	−19%
Majority		1,818		
Registered electors		8,946		
Turnout		2,864	32%	+15%
Labour hold		Swing		

=== St. Mary's ===
St. Mary's
Party	Candidate	Votes	%	±%
Labour	R. C. Evans	2,850	69%	+33%
Conservative	J. Tushingham *	1,308	31%	−33%
Majority		1,542		
Registered electors		10,467		
Turnout		4,158	40%	+8%
Labour gain from Conservative		Swing		

=== St. Michael's ===
St. Michael's
Party	Candidate	Votes	%	±%
Conservative	A. McVeigh *	1,744	50%	−33%
Labour	B. J. Johnson	1,436	42%	+30%
Liberal	D. H. Reece	214	6%	+6%
Majority		308		
Registered electors		10,568		
Turnout		3,454	33%	+3%
Conservative hold		Swing		

=== Smithdown ===
Smithdown
Party	Candidate	Votes	%	±%
Labour	C. H. Winter	1,372	62%	+31%
Liberal	R. Madeley jnr.	482	22%	+22%
Conservative	J. McDermott *	349	16%	−53%
Majority		890		
Registered electors		7,566		
Turnout		2,203	29%	+15%
Labour gain from Conservative		Swing		

=== Speke ===
Speke
Party	Candidate	Votes	%	±%
Labour	G. Maudsley	4,100	80%	+30%
Conservative	C. Hallows *	1,024	20%	−30%
Majority		3,076		
Registered electors		15,678		
Turnout		5,124	33%	+14%
Labour gain from Conservative		Swing		

=== Tuebrook ===
Tuebrook
Party	Candidate	Votes	%	±%
Labour	D. Mitchell	2,621	63%	+35%
Conservative	R. M. Aymes *	1,536	37%	−35%
Majority		1,085		
Registered electors		11,826		
Turnout		4,157	35%	+5%
Labour gain from Conservative		Swing		

=== Vauxhall ===
Vauxhall
Party	Candidate	Votes	%	±%
Labour	A. Dunford *	916	96%	+32%
Conservative	A. M. Bowner	43	4%	−46%
Majority		873		
Registered electors		6,132		
Turnout		959	16%	+6%
Labour hold		Swing		

=== Warbreck ===
Warbreck
Party	Candidate	Votes	%	±%
Labour	J. Finnegan	2,094	57%	+40%
Conservative	D. A. Ritchie	1,594	43%	−25%
Majority		500		
Registered electors		12,265		
Turnout		3,688	30%	0%
Labour gain from Conservative		Swing		

=== Westminster ===
Westminster
Party	Candidate	Votes	%	±%
Labour	W. Lafferty	1,506	65%	+23%
Conservative	W. Gilbody *	805	35%	−23%
Majority		701		
Registered electors		6,159		
Turnout		2,311	38%	+8%
Labour gain from Conservative		Swing		

=== Woolton ===
Woolton
Party	Candidate	Votes	%	±%
Labour	A. Fletcher	4,204	54%	+42%
Conservative	L. B. Williams	3,556	46%	−42%
Majority		648		
Registered electors		27,610		
Turnout		7,760	28%	0%
Labour gain from Conservative		Swing		
