= 1970 Liverpool City Council election =

1970 UK local election

← 1969	7 May 1970	1971 →

40 councillors' seats were up for election (one third): one seat for each of the 40 wards 81 of 120 Councillors and 40 Aldermen seats needed for a majority
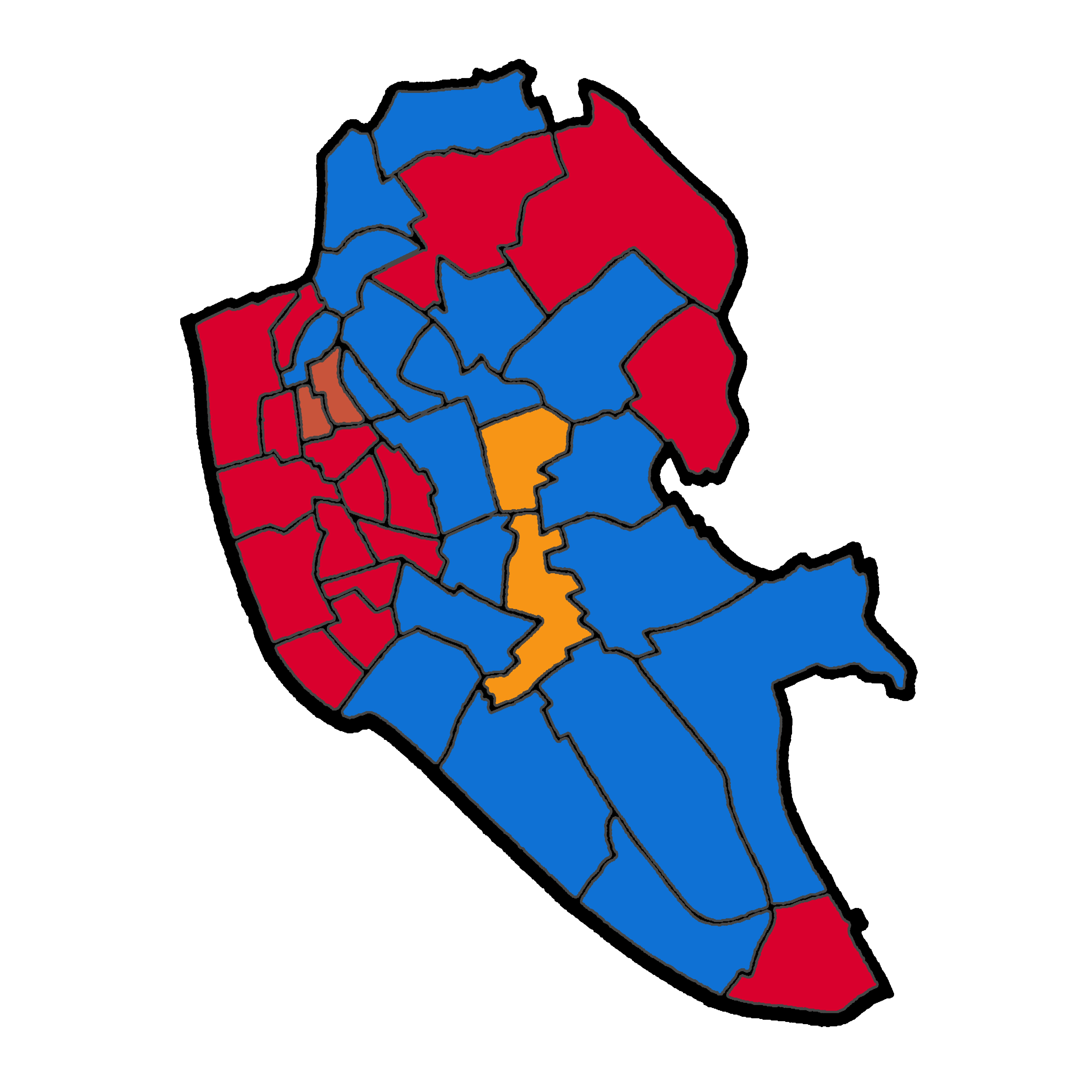
- Map of Liverpool showing wards won (first placed party)

Elections to Liverpool City Council were held on 7 May 1970.

One third of the council was up for election.

After the election, the composition of the council was:

Party	Councillors	±	Aldermen
Conservative	79	-9	??
Labour	30	+7	??
Liberal	4	+2	??
Protestant	7	0	??

== Election result ==
Liverpool local election result 1970
Party	Seats	Gains	Losses	Net gain/loss	Seats %	Votes %	Votes	+/−
Conservative	19				47.5%	48%	72,584	
Labour	17				42.5%	43%	64,880	
Liberal	2				5%	7%	11,381	
Protestant	2	0	0	0	5%	1.2%	1,901	
Communist	0	0	0	0	0%	1.1%	1,604	
Independent	0	0	0	0	0%	0.02%	26	

== Ward results ==
* - Councillor seeking re-election

=== Abercromby ===
Abercromby
Party	Candidate	Votes	%	±%
Labour	J. E. McPherson *	883	66%	▲18%
Conservative	A. W. Jones	298	22%	▼19%
Communist	A. McClelland	150	11%	Steady
Majority		585		
Registered electors		5,684		
Turnout		1,331	23%	+3%
Labour hold		Swing		

=== Aigburth ===
Aigburth
Party	Candidate	Votes	%	±%
Conservative	J. E. R. Fischer *	4,522	84%	+5%
Labour	G. T. Walsh	860	16%	+9%
Majority		3,662		
Registered electors		14,772		
Turnout		5,382	37%	−10%
Conservative hold		Swing		

=== Allerton ===
Allerton
Party	Candidate	Votes	%	±%
Conservative	S. B. Caulfield *	3,195	81%	+1%
Labour	S. G. Thorne	756	19%	+9%
Majority		2,439		
Registered electors		10,972		
Turnout		3,951	36%	−7%
Conservative hold		Swing		

=== Anfield ===
Anfield
Party	Candidate	Votes	%	±%
Conservative	Mrs. M. Fitzsimmons	2,755	61%	−11%
Labour	D. M. Mitchell	1,753	39%	+11%
Majority		1,002		
Registered electors		13,655		
Turnout		4,508	33%	−3%
Conservative hold		Swing		

=== Arundel ===
Arundel
Party	Candidate	Votes	%	±%
Conservative	J. E. Kendrick *	2,621	62%	−7%
Labour	M. Evans	1,501	36%	+8%
Communist	J. Kay	103	2%	−1%
Majority		1,120		
Registered electors		13,815		
Turnout		4,225	31%	−3%
Conservative hold		Swing		

=== Breckfield ===
Breckfield
Party	Candidate	Votes	%	±%
Conservative	K.B. Jacques *	1,392	57%	0%
Labour	T. Roberts	1,044	43%	0%
Majority		348		
Registered electors		9,985		
Turnout		2,436	25%	−9%
Conservative hold		Swing		

=== Broadgreen ===
Broadgreen
Party	Candidate	Votes	%	±%
Conservative	Mrs. D. I. Keenan	2,002	44%	−26%
Liberal	H. Davies	1,598	35%	+35%
Labour	D. Cowley	966	21%	+2%
Majority		404		
Registered electors		11,753		
Turnout		4,566	39%	+4%
Conservative hold		Swing		

=== Central ===
Central
Party	Candidate	Votes	%	±%
Labour	J. E. Walker *	1,607	86%	+33%
Conservative	F. Jones	117	6%	−41%
Liberal	J. E. Gallagher	110	6%	+6%
Communist	R. Woods	30	2%	+2%
Majority		1,490		
Registered electors		5,828		
Turnout		1,864	32%	−2%
Labour hold		Swing		

=== Childwall ===
Childwall
Party	Candidate	Votes	%	±%
Conservative	A. Fearenside	4,401	55%	−16%
Liberal	H. Davies	2,519	32%	+12%
Labour	S. F. Jacobs	1,003	13%	+3%
Majority		1,882		
Registered electors		19,306		
Turnout		7,988	41%	+1%
Conservative hold		Swing		

=== Church ===
Church
Party	Candidate	Votes	%	±%
Liberal	Owen Trevor Jones	4,019	54%	+20%
Conservative	S. P. Mason	2,862	39%	−20%
Labour	C. H. J. Winter	501	7%	0%
Majority		1,157		
Registered electors		14,671		
Turnout		7,382	50%	+2%
Liberal gain from Conservative		Swing		

=== Clubmoor ===
Clubmoor
Party	Candidate	Votes	%	±%
Conservative	J. F. Jones *	2,074	49%	−8%
Labour	T. McManus	1,938	46%	+3%
Liberal	J. G. Morgan	231	5%	+5%
Majority		136		
Registered electors		11,328		
Turnout		4,243	37%	−10%
Conservative hold		Swing		

=== County ===
County
Party	Candidate	Votes	%	±%
Conservative	P. Tunna *	2,445	53%	−6%
Labour	J. McLean	2,003	44%	+8%
Communist	K. T. Dowd	143	3%	−2%
Majority		442		
Registered electors		13,315		
Turnout		4,591	34%	−7%
Conservative hold		Swing		

=== Croxteth ===
Croxteth
Party	Candidate	Votes	%	±%
Conservative	Dr. G. H. Prince *	3,596	77%	−6%
Labour	R. Ludvigsen	1,084	23%	+6%
Majority		2,512		
Registered electors		12,940		
Turnout		4,680	36%	−8%
Conservative hold		Swing		

=== Dingle ===
Dingle
Party	Candidate	Votes	%	±%
Labour	R. Stoddart *	2,481	60%	+12%
Conservative	D. M. Pannell	1,520	37%	−10%
Communist	J. Cook	134	3%	−1%
Majority		961		
Registered electors		10,831		
Turnout		4,135	38%	+3%
Labour hold		Swing		

=== Dovecot ===
Dovecot
Party	Candidate	Votes	%	±%
Labour	W. P. Johnson	3,314	61%	+14%
Conservative	G. E. Brandwood *	2,103	39%	−14%
Majority		1,211		
Registered electors		16,539		
Turnout		5,417	33%	−6%
Labour gain from Conservative		Swing		

=== Everton ===
Everton
Party	Candidate	Votes	%	±%
Labour	F. Burke *	588	62%	
Conservative	J. Irving	364	38%	
Majority		224		
Registered electors		3,268		
Turnout		952	29%	
Labour hold		Swing		

=== Fairfield ===
Fairfield
Party	Candidate	Votes	%	±%
Conservative	J. Pownall	1,942	56%	
Labour	E. Burke	1,498	44%	
Majority		444		
Registered electors		12,197		
Turnout		3,440	28%	
Conservative hold		Swing		

=== Fazakerley ===
Fazakerley
Party	Candidate	Votes	%	±%
Conservative	D. R. Bushell	2,260	54%	
Labour	M. Black	1,955	46%	
Majority		305		
Registered electors		11,781		
Turnout		4,215	36%	
Conservative hold		Swing		

=== Gillmoss ===
Gillmoss
Party	Candidate	Votes	%	±%
Labour	Eddie Loyden	4,270	67%	
Conservative	Mrs. E. G. Smith	1,990	31%	
Communist	K. Dunlop	130	2%	
Majority		2,280		
Registered electors		20,237		
Turnout		6,390	32%	
Labour hold		Swing		

=== Granby ===
Granby
Party	Candidate	Votes	%	±%
Labour	John D. Hamilton	1,457	58%	+1%
Conservative	G. Hughes	981	39%	−4%
Communist	J. Powell	68	3%	
Majority		476		
Registered electors		9,095		
Turnout		2,506	28%	
Labour hold		Swing		

=== Kensington ===
Kensington
Party	Candidate	Votes	%	±%
Labour	E. D. Roderick	1,559	52%	+27%
Conservative	F. R. Butler	1,421	48%	−4%
Majority		138		
Registered electors		10,836		
Turnout		2,980	28%	
Labour gain from Conservative		Swing		

=== Low Hill ===
Low Hill
Party	Candidate	Votes	%	±%
Labour	Mrs. M. J. Powell	1,066	63%	+24%
Conservative	S. K. Cross	610	36%	−21%
Independent	W. Finnegan	26	2%	
Majority		456		
Registered electors		5,075		
Turnout		1,702	34%	
Labour gain from Conservative		Swing		

=== Melrose ===
Melrose
Party	Candidate	Votes	%	±%
Labour	I. I. Levin	1,376	59%	+2%
Conservative	C. E. Rapson	776	33%	−10%
Liberal	J. J. Hastings *	191	8%	
Majority		600		
Registered electors		7,618		
Turnout		2,343	31%	+5%
Labour hold		Swing		

=== Netherfield ===
Netherfield
Party	Candidate	Votes	%	±%
Protestant	A. Brown *	750	57%	−5%
Labour	S. J. Chegwin	572	43%	+9%
Majority		178		
Registered electors		4,359		
Turnout		1,322	30%	+3%
Protestant hold		Swing		

=== Old Swan ===
Old Swan
Party	Candidate	Votes	%	±%
Liberal	Mrs. Doreen Jones	2,713	48%	+48%
Conservative	A. J. Browne *	1,887	33%	−27%
Labour	F. Gaier	1,098	19%	−21%
Majority		826		
Registered electors		13,931		
Turnout		5,698	41%	+4%
Liberal gain from Conservative		Swing		

=== Picton ===
Picton
Party	Candidate	Votes	%	±%
Conservative	C. J. Kinrade *	2,149	50%	−9%
Labour	T. Bailey	2,033	48%	+7%
Communist	Mrs. H. A. Thomas	87	2%	+2%
Majority		116		
Registered electors		12,964		
Turnout		4,269	33%	−3%
Conservative hold		Swing		

=== Pirrie ===
Pirrie
Party	Candidate	Votes	%	±%
Labour	H. Dalton	3,703	60%	+13%
Conservative	J. F. Atkinson	2,359	38%	−15%
Communist	Brian Anderson	113	2%	+2%
Majority		113		
Registered electors		16,794		
Turnout		6,175	37%	−5%
Labour gain from Conservative		Swing		

=== Prince's Park ===
Prince's Park
Party	Candidate	Votes	%	±%
Labour	J. F. Stevens	1,919	58%	+12%
Conservative	A. Palin	1,298	39%	−12%
Communist	J. F. Greig	93	3%	−1%
Majority		621		
Registered electors		10,059		
Turnout		3,310	33%	−2%
Labour gain from Conservative		Swing		

=== Sandhills ===
Sandhills
Party	Candidate	Votes	%	±%
Labour	Miss M. Schofield *	1,545	71%	+2%
Conservative	J. Barton	636	29%	+2%
Majority		909		
Registered electors		6,676		
Turnout		2,181	33%	+4%
Labour hold		Swing		

=== St. Domingo ===
St. Domingo
Party	Candidate	Votes	%	±%
Protestant	R. Hughes *	1,151	57%	+3%
Labour	A. Williams	875	43%	0%
Majority		276		
Registered electors		8,697		
Turnout		2,026	23%	−8%
Protestant hold		Swing		

=== St. James ===
St. James
Party	Candidate	Votes	%	±%
Labour	R. Parry *	2,122	72%	+21%
Communist	R. O'Hara	488	16%	+5%
Conservative	R. Bostock	356	12%	−14%
Majority		971		
Registered electors		8,944		
Turnout		2,966	33%	+10%
Labour hold		Swing		

=== St. Mary's ===
St. Mary's
Party	Candidate	Votes	%	±%
Conservative	W. L. Harris *	1,804	56%	
Labour	P. Grannel	1,441	44%	−4%
Majority		363		
Registered electors		10,740		
Turnout		3,245	30%	−12%
Conservative hold		Swing		

=== St. Michael's ===
St. Michael's
Party	Candidate	Votes	%	±%
Conservative	Mrs. M. Brown *	2,413	53%	−15%
Labour	R. C. Evans	2,122	47%	+25%
Majority		291		
Registered electors		10,615		
Turnout		4,535	43%	+2%
Conservative hold		Swing		

=== Smithdown ===
Smithdown
Party	Candidate	Votes	%	±%
Labour	H. Lee	1,147	68%	+15%
Conservative	Mrs. M. G. Savage	551	32%	−15%
Majority		596		
Registered electors		7,808		
Turnout		1,698	22%	+3%
Labour gain from Conservative		Swing		

=== Speke ===
Speke
Party	Candidate	Votes	%	±%
Labour	Ken Stewart	3,065	62%	+15%
Conservative	C. Smith	1,918	38%	−15%
Majority		1,147		
Registered electors		16,029		
Turnout		4,983	31%	+5%
Labour gain from Conservative		Swing		

=== Tuebrook ===
Tuebrook
Party	Candidate	Votes	%	±%
Conservative	G. B. Watterson	2,252	56%	−5%
Labour	J. Mottram	1,778	44%	+5%
Majority		474		
Registered electors		11,995		
Turnout		4,030	34%	−8%
Conservative hold		Swing		

=== Vauxhall ===
Vauxhall
Party	Candidate	Votes	%	±%
Labour	Paul Orr *	1,348	93%	+9%
Conservative	J. Howard	102	7%	−5%
Majority		1,246		
Registered electors		6,511		
Turnout		1,450	22%	+5%
Labour hold		Swing		

=== Warbreck ===
Warbreck
Party	Candidate	Votes	%	±%
Conservative	D. Greenway	2,327	62%	−8%
Labour	J. M. Burke	1,398	38%	+8%
Majority		929		
Registered electors		12,344		
Turnout		3,725	30%	−4%
Conservative hold		Swing		

=== Westminster ===
Westminster
Party	Candidate	Votes	%	±%
Conservative	James Gillin *	1,240	53%	+2%
Labour	J. Gardner	1,118	47%	−2%
Majority		122		
Registered electors		6,228		
Turnout		2,358	38%	−1%
Conservative hold		Swing		

=== Woolton ===
Woolton
Party	Candidate	Votes	%	±%
Conservative	Mrs. T. L. Norton	5,045	70%	−9%
Labour	Tony Mulhearn	2,133	30%	−9%
Majority		2,912		
Registered electors		24,035		
Turnout		7,178	30%	−7%
Conservative hold		Swing		

== Aldermanic Elections ==
Twenty of the forty Aldermen were elected by the city council on 18 May 1970. Those elected by the council and the wards they were allocated to are shown in the table below:

Party	Alderman	Ward
Labour	Louis Caplan	Allerton
Labour	Hugh Carr	Arundel
Labour	Sir Joseph Cleary	Picton
Labour	David Cowley	Dingle
Labour	Brian Crookes	Church
Labour	James Cullen	Warbreck
Labour	Charles Minton	Netherfield
Labour	Joseph Morgan	Smithdown
Conservative	James Porter	County
Conservative	James Ross	Central
Labour	William Sefton	Croxteth
Labour	John Sheehan	Granby
Conservative	William Thomas	Everton
Conservative	Mrs. Ruth Dean	Breckfield
Conservative	Clarence Dickinson	Kensington
Conservative	John Kendrick	Sandhills
Conservative	James McAllister	Gillmoss
Conservative	Ralph Morris	Fairfield
Conservative	Clifford Price	Childwall
Conservative	David Williams	St. Mary's
