= Cyril Taylor =

Cyril Taylor may refer to:

- Cyril Taylor (doctor) (1921–2000), British doctor and Liverpool politician
- Sir Cyril Taylor (educationist) (1935–2018), British educationist and social entrepreneur
