= Cyril Taylor (doctor) =

British doctor and Liverpool politician

Cyril Taylor (9 March 1921 – 11 December 2000) was a medical doctor in general practice and politician in Liverpool.

He was born in New Brighton to orthodox Jewish parents. The family changed their name from Zadesky to reflect his father's profession. He went to Wallasey Grammar School, where he was active in the Federation of Zionist Youth and later joined the Communist Party of Great Britain.

He studied medicine at Liverpool University. He worked at the medical receiving centre at Alder Hey Hospital which received casualties from the evacuation of Dunkirk. During his national service he became major in charge of the British hospital in Khartoum.

In 1946, he was one of a delegation of doctors from the Socialist Medical Association who met Nye Bevan and urged him to resist the demands of the medical establishment. He was President of the Socialist Health Association from 1980 to 1989.

In 1949 he was appointed medical officer with the Liverpool Shipping Federation but was sacked because of his politics. He then set up as a general practitioner in his home in Sefton Drive, Liverpool. He became an active member of the Hospital and Welfare Services Union and later the Confederation of Health Service Employees. He stood for election to the City Council as a Communist in 1949 and was reprimanded by COHSE for referring to his membership in his election literature. He left the Communist Party in 1956. He played for Sefton Rugby Club until he was 40.

He was an elected member of Liverpool City Council from 1966 and became chair of the social services committee. He helped to establish the Centre 56 Women & Children's Aid Centre in 1973. He was appointed a member of the Royal Commission on the National Health Service in 1975.

He pioneered the concept of NHS Health Centres and was instrumental in establishing the Princes Park health centre, in Toxteth in 1977.Beryl Bainbridge, Fritz Spiegl, Alexei Sayle and Adrian Henri were his patients there. Henri produced a poem and a portrait of him as a tennis player. In 2021 two of his former colleagues, Katy Gardner and Susanna Graham-Jones, produced an account of the centre: A Radical Practice in Liverpool: the rise, fall and rise of the Princes Park Health centre.

== Publications ==
- Is your GP really necessary?
- Charter for Health
