= Dovecot, Liverpool =

District of Liverpool, England

Coordinates: 53.417°N 2.885°W

Dovecot
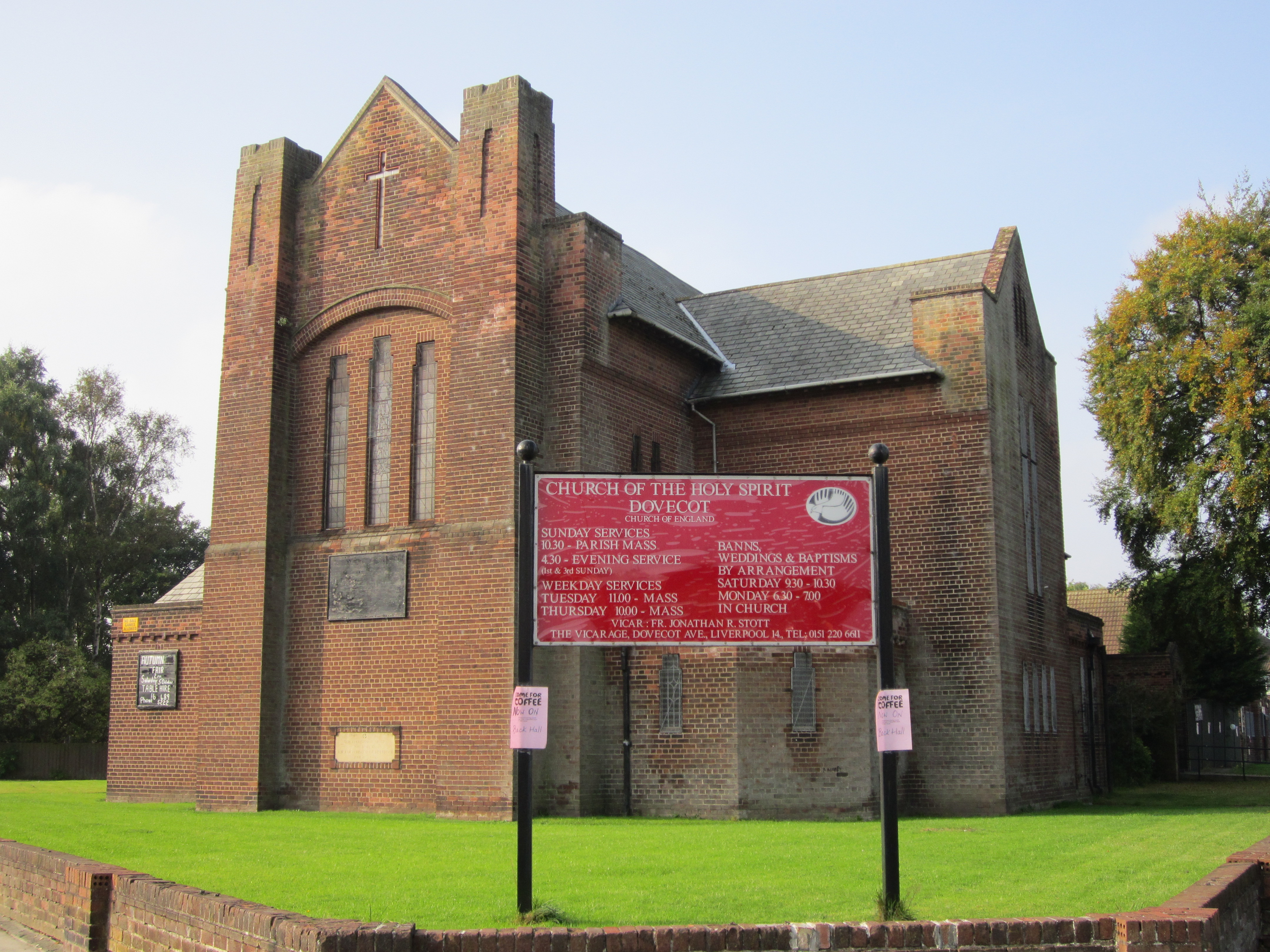
- Church of the Holy Spirit, Dovecot

- Location within Merseyside
- OS grid reference: SJ412915
- Metropolitan borough: Liverpool
- Metropolitan county: Merseyside
- Region: North West
- Country: England
- Sovereign state: United Kingdom
- Post town: LIVERPOOL
- Postcode district: L14
- Dialling code: 0151
- Police: Merseyside
- Fire: Merseyside
- Ambulance: North West
- UK Parliament: Liverpool Wavertree

Dovecot is a district of Liverpool, England, on the eastern edge of the city bordered by Knotty Ash, West Derby, Broadgreen and Roby. The area is part of the Knotty Ash ward of Liverpool City Council.

== Description ==
Dovecot is a small district composed primarily of 20th-century townhouses, usually large in size. There are a number of more desirable semi-detached houses on the border with Knotty Ash. The main attraction of the area is Dovecot Park, Which is now home to flocks of parakeet.

== Transport ==
The closest railway station is Broad Green, which offers regular services to Liverpool city centre, Manchester, Wigan, and St Helens.
