= Fairfield, Liverpool =

Area of Liverpool, England

Coordinates: 53.404°N 2.935°W

Fairfield
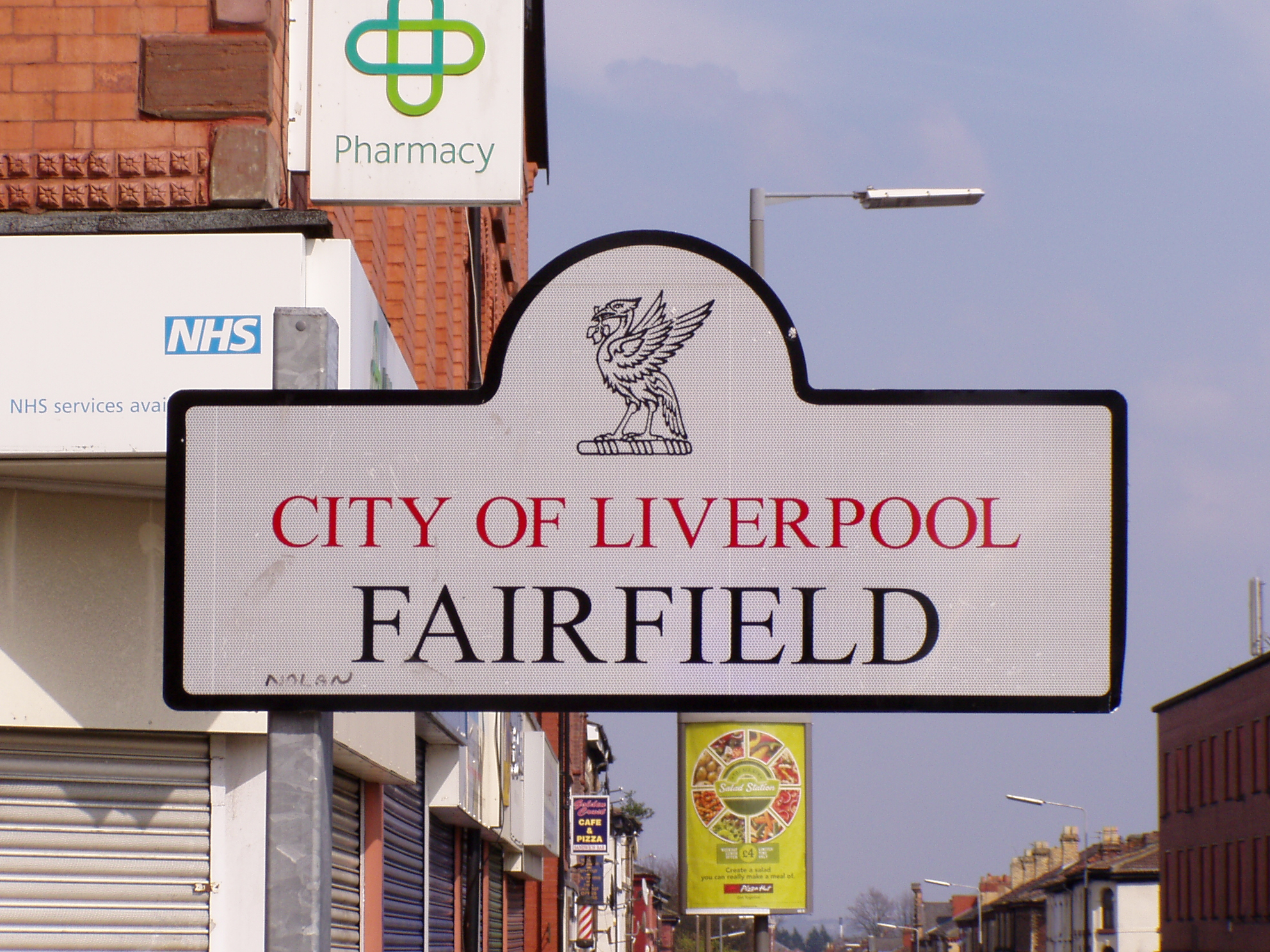
- Sign as you enter Fairfield from Kensington

- Location within Merseyside
- Metropolitan borough: Liverpool
- Metropolitan county: Merseyside
- Region: North West
- Country: England
- Sovereign state: United Kingdom
- Post town: LIVERPOOL
- Postcode district: L6, L7
- Dialling code: 0151
- Police: Merseyside
- Fire: Merseyside
- Ambulance: North West
- UK Parliament: Liverpool Wavertree

Fairfield is an area of Liverpool, in Merseyside, England, encompassing streets between Tuebrook and Kensington and stretching to Old Swan. It consists of a variety of houses; there are some traditional red-brick terraces, larger Victorian villas and also the notable 300-year-old Georgian Fairfield Crescent which is off the equally old Prospect Vale. The area also contains the Victorian Newsham Park; Friends of Newsham Park meet with council officers regularly at the Newsham Park park forum to discuss improvements to the park and are currently anticipating the start on site of the building of a new pavilion.

Fairfield is now also home to a new shopping development on Prescot Road, which brings retail stores like Iceland and other shops into this once neglected neighbourhood centre.

Another new facility is the community fire station on Beech Street which was opened in 2010 by the Duchess of Gloucester. It has been named "Kensington" Fire Station, despite being just inside the Fairfield border. Fairfield is paired with Kensington to form a Liverpool City Council Ward.

The district is primarily residential although a few industrial estate roads exist.

== Toponymy ==
Fairfield means "land where swine are pastured", from Old English fōr "swine" and feld "field, pasture". The name was recorded as Fornefeled in 1129.
