= Gillmoss =

Area of Liverpool, England

Coordinates: 53.45819°N 2.89957°W

- Location within Merseyside
- OS grid reference: SJ383954
- Metropolitan borough: Liverpool
- Metropolitan county: Merseyside
- Region: North West
- Country: England
- Sovereign state: United Kingdom
- Post town: LIVERPOOL
- Postcode district: L11
- Dialling code: 0151
- Police: Merseyside
- Fire: Merseyside
- Ambulance: North West
- UK Parliament: Liverpool West Derby

Gillmoss is an area in north Liverpool, Merseyside, England, located between Croxteth, Fazakerley and Kirkby.

== Description ==
Gillmoss is a predominantly industrial area with little residential housing although pockets exist around the East Lancashire Road, and parts have been described as a 'ghost town' after years of decay. More recently, a commercial development known as Stonebridge Park has been built as part of regeneration project in this part of north Liverpool which currently houses Euro Foodbrands Export Ltd, P.A Foods Ltd and Healthy Foods Online Ltd.

One of Liverpool's largest bus depots, originally built by Liverpool Corporation Transport but now owned by Stagecoach, is based in Gillmoss on the East Lancs Road.

Gillmoss falls between the neighbouring suburbs of Croxteth and Fazakerley with Kirkby nearby. As a small district, it is often merged with Croxteth, a larger suburb of the city.
