= Picton (ward) =

Former metropolitan borough council ward in Liverpool, England

Coordinates: 53.404°N 2.939°W

- Picton ward (2004) within Liverpool
- Area: 2.173 km^{2} (0.839 sq mi)
- Population: 18,906 (2021 census)
  - Density: 8,700/km^{2} (23,000/sq mi)
- Registered Electors: 11,445 (2021 election)
- Metropolitan borough: City of Liverpool
- Metropolitan county: Merseyside
- Region: North West
- Country: England
- Sovereign state: United Kingdom
- UK Parliament: Liverpool Wavertree

Picton ward was an electoral division of Liverpool City Council centred on the Edge Hill, Liverpool district of Liverpool.

== Background ==
The ward was first established in 1953 and its boundaries were changed in 1974, 1980 and 2004 before being dissolved in 2023.

=== 1980 boundaries ===
1980 Old Swan ward

The ward boundary was changed for the 1980 elections. A report of the Local Government Boundary Commission for England published in November 1978 set out proposals for changes to the wards of Liverpool City Council, maintaining the number of councillors at 99 representing 33 wards. Picton ward was represented by three councillors.

The report describes the boundaries of Picton ward as "Commencing at a point where Smithdown Road meets the eastern boundary of Smithdown Ward, thence generally northeastwards, generally northwestwards and southeastwards along said boundary to the southern boundary of Kensington Ward, thence eastwards along said boundary to Rathbone Road, thence southwestwards along said road to Shanklin Road, thence eastwards and southwards along said road to Sandown Road, thence eastwards and southwestwards along said road and continuing southwestwards along Sandown Lane to High Street, thence southeastwards along said street to Grange Terrace, thence southwestwards along said terrace and continuing southwards along the path across Wavertree Playground, between Grange Terrace and Smithdown Road, to Smithdown Road, thence westwards along said road to Garmoyle Road, thence northwestwards along said road to Wellington Avenue, thence southwestwards along said avenue to Smithdown Road, thence northwestwards along said road to the point of commencement".

=== 2004 boundaries ===
A review by the Boundary Committee for England recommended that the council was formed of a reduced number of 90 members elected from 30 wards. The ward was formed from the former Picton ward, losing some of the pre-2004 ward and gaining from the former Kensington, Smithdown and Arundel wards. The ward was part of the Liverpool Wavertree Parliamentary constituency.

The population at the 2011 census was 17,009, and at the 2021 Census was 18,906.

== Councillors ==
Election	Councillor	Councillor	Councillor
2004	Laurence Sidorczuk (LD)	Ian Jobling (LD)	Andrew Makinson (LD)
2006	Laurence Sidorczuk (LD)	Ian Jobling (LD)	Andrew Makinson (LD)
2007	Laurence Sidorczuk (LD)	Ian Jobling (LD)	Andrew Makinson (LD)
2008	Laurence Sidorczuk (LD)	Ian Jobling (LD)	Andrew Makinson (LD)
2010	Tim Beaumont (Lab)	Ian Jobling (Lab)	Andrew Makinson (LD)
2011	Tim Beaumont (Lab)	Abdul Qadir (Lab)	Andrew Makinson (LD)
2012	Tim Beaumont (Lab)	Abdul Qadir (Lab)	Nathalie Nicholas (Lab)
2014	Tim Beaumont (Lab)	Abdul Qadir (Lab)	Nathalie Nicholas (Lab)
2015	Tim Beaumont (Lab)	Abdul Qadir (Lab)	Nathalie Nicholas (Lab)
2016	Tim Beaumont (Lab)	Abdul Qadir (Lab)	Nathalie Nicholas (Lab)
2018	Paul Kenyon (Lab)	Abdul Qadir (Lab)	Nathalie Nicholas (Lab)
2019	Calvin Smeda (Lab)	Abdul Qadir (Lab)	Nathalie Nicholas (Lab)
2021	Calvin Smeda (Lab)	Abdul Qadir (Lab)	Nathalie Nicholas (Lab)

indicates seat up for re-election after boundary changes.

indicates seat up for re-election.

indicates change in affiliation.

indicates seat up for re-election after casual vacancy.

=== Notes ===
- Cllr Ian Jobling (Lib Dem, 2007) defected to the Labour Party and was subsequently elected as a Labour candidate in the Allerton & Hunts Cross ward.
- Cllr Paul Kenyon (Labour, 2018) resigned from the council in September 2019

== Election results ==
=== Elections of the 2020s ===
Liverpool City Council Municipal Elections: Thursday 6 May 2021
Party	Candidate	Votes	%	±%
**Labour**	**Nathalie Nicholas**	**1,697**	**65.67**	**▼13.78**
Green	Maria Teresa Coughlan	443	17.14	▲10.15
Liberal Democrats	Jenny Turner	198	7.66	▲2.52
Conservative	Joshua Forrester	165	6.39	▲0.85
Liberal	Alan Oscroft	81	3.13%	▲1.48
Majority		1,254	48.53	▼23.93
Turnout		2,584	22.58	▼34.11
Rejected ballots		63	2.38	▲1.79
Total ballots		2,647	23.13	
Registered electors		11,445		
Labour **hold**		Swing	-11.97	

=== Elections of the 2010s ===
Picton by-election 2019
Party	Candidate	Votes	%	±%
**Labour**	**Calvin Wesley Smeda**	**5,196**	**79.45**	**▲9.61**
Green	Sophie Brown	457	6.99	▼8.23
Conservative	Chris Hall	362	5.54	▲1.23
Liberal Democrats	Jenny Turner	336	5.14	▼2.36
Liberal	Alan Oscroft	108	1.65	▼1.49
Independent	Adam Heatherington	81	1.24	N/A
Majority		4,739	72.46	▲17.84
Turnout		6,540	56.69	▲34.32
Rejected ballots		39	0.59	▼0.39
Total ballots		6,579	57.03	
Registered electors		11,536		
Labour **hold**		Swing	+8.92	

Liverpool City Council Municipal Elections: Thursday 2 May 2019
Party	Candidate	Votes	%	±%
**Labour**	**Abdul Qadir**	**1,556**	**69.84**	**▼13.75**
Green	Sophie Brown	339	15.22	▲9.20
Liberal Democrats	Steve Brauner	167	7.50	▲3.69
Conservative	Joshua Forrester	96	4.31	▲1.02
Liberal	Alan Oscroft	70	3.14	▲2.23
Majority		1,217	54.62	▼22.96
Turnout		2,250	22.37	▼0.85
Registered electors		10,059		
Rejected ballots		22	0.98	▲0.46
Labour **hold**		Swing	-11.47	

Liverpool City Council Municipal Elections: 3rd May 2018
Party	Candidate	Votes	%	±%
**Labour**	**Paul David Kenyon**	**1,931**	**83.59**	**▲10.60**
Green	Paul Woodruff	139	6.02	▼4.05
Liberal Democrats	Alex Cottrell	88	3.81	▼4.29
Conservative	Johnathan Peter Andrew	76	3.29	▼0.38
Independent	Adam Giles Heatherington	55	2.38	N/A
Liberal	Colin Edwards	21	0.91	N/A
Majority		1,792	77.58	▲14.66
Turnout		2,322	23.22	▼4.25
Registered electors		10,002		
Rejected ballots		12	0.52	▼1.11
Labour **hold**		Swing	+2.94	

Liverpool City Council Municipal Elections: 5th May 2016
Party	Candidate	Votes	%	±%
Labour	**Nathalie Alicia Nicholas**	**1,892**	**72.99%**	▲3.66
Green	Paul Woodruff	261	10.07%	▼2.21
Liberal Democrats	Kevin White	210	8.10%	▲3.15
TUSC	Frank Bowen	134	5.17%	▲2.31
Conservative	Laura Elizabeth Watson	95	3.67%	▼0.38
Majority		1,631	62.92%	▲5.88
Turnout		2,635	27.47%	▼27.06
Registered electors		9,592		
Rejected ballots		43	1.63%	▲0.44
Labour **hold**		Swing	▲2.94	

Liverpool City Council Municipal Elections: 7th May 2015
Party	Candidate	Votes	%	±%
Labour	**Abdul Qadir**	**3,849**	**69.33%**	▲3.47
Green	Paul David Kenyon	682	12.28%	▲1.08
UKIP	Adam Giles Heathington	362	6.52%	▼4.75
Liberal Democrats	Kevin White	275	4.95%	▲0.03
Conservative	Alma McGing	225	4.05%	▲1.00
TUSC	Frank Bowen	159	2.86%	▲0.62
Majority		3,167	57.04%	▲2.45
Turnout		5,584	54.53%	▲27.82
Registered electors		10,240		
Rejected ballots		32	0.57%	
Labour **hold**		Swing	▲1.19	

Liverpool City Council Municipal Elections: 22nd May 2014
Party	Candidate	Votes	%	±%
Labour	**Tim Beaumont**	1794	65.86%	−8.84%
UKIP	David Halvorsen	307	11.27%	+6.89%
Green	Ross James Campbell	305	11.20%	+3.77%
Liberal Democrats	Kevin White	134	4.92%	−2.59%
Conservative	Alma Gavine McGing	83	3.05%	−0.11%
TUSC	Frank Bowen	61	2.24%	n/a
Liberal	Susan O'Brien	40	1.47%	−1.69%
Majority		1,487	54.59%	−12.60%
Turnout		2724	26.71%	+1.35%
Labour **hold**		Swing	-7.87%	

Liverpool City Council Municipal Elections 2012: 3rd May 2012
Party	Candidate	Votes	%	±%
Labour	**Nathalie Alicia Nicholas**	1960	74.70%	+12.51%
Liberal Democrats	Paul Woodruff	197	7.51%	−15.17%
Green	Jennifer Jane Geddes	195	7.43%	−0.24%
UKIP	Shimrit Manning	115	4.38%	n/a
Liberal	Shelley Harrison	83	3.16%	−1.37%
Conservative	Seth Pemberton	74	3.16%	+0.23%
Majority		1,763	67.19%	+27.69%
Turnout		2624	25.36%	−5.94%
Labour **gain** from Liberal Democrats		Swing	+13.84%	

Liverpool City Council Municipal Elections 2011: 5th May 2011
Party	Candidate	Votes	%	±%
Labour	**Abdul Basit Qadir**	**2059**	**62.19%**	+7.77%
Liberal Democrats	Laurence Sidorczuk	751	22.68%	−10.41%
Green	Jennifer Jane Geddes	254	7.67%	+4.00%
Liberal	Griffith Wynne Parry	150	4.53%	−0.12%
Conservative	Patricia Anita Waddington	97	2.93%	−1.24%
Majority		1308	39.50%	+18.17%
Turnout		3311	31.30%	−18.52%
Labour **hold**		Swing	9.09%	

Liverpool City Council Municipal Elections 2010: Picton
Party	Candidate	Votes	%	±%
Labour	**Timothy Martin Beaumont**	**2937**	**54.42%**	
Liberal Democrats	Laurence Sidorczuk	1786	33.09%	
Liberal	Griffith Wynne Parry	251	4.65%	
Conservative	Pauline Anne Shuttleworth	225	4.17%	
Green	Ian Harvey	198	3.67%	
Majority		1151	21.33%	
Turnout		5397	49.82%	
Labour **gain** from Liberal Democrats		Swing		

=== Elections of the 2000s ===
Liverpool City Council Municipal Elections 2008: Picton
Party	Candidate	Votes	%	±%
Liberal Democrats	**Andrew Makinson**	**1262**	**47.89%**	
Labour	Timothy Martin Beaumont	1015	38.52%	
Green	Laurence Wilson	150	5.69%	
Liberal	Griffith Wynne Parry	109	4.14%	
Conservative	Ann Temple	99	3.76%	
Majority				
Turnout		2635	24.16%	
Liberal Democrats **hold**		Swing		

Liverpool City Council Municipal Elections 2007: Picton
Party	Candidate	Votes	%	±%
Liberal Democrats	**Ian Jobling**	**1316**	**53.41%**	
Labour	Denis Dunphy	721	29.26%	
Liberal	Griffith Wynne Parry	236	9.58%	
Green	Jean Hill	118	4.79%	
Conservative	Ann Temple	73	2.96%	
Majority				
Turnout		2464	22.99%	
Liberal Democrats **hold**		Swing		

Liverpool City Council Municipal Elections 2006: Picton
Party	Candidate	Votes	%	±%
Liberal Democrats	**Laurence Sidorczuk**	**1253**	**49.55%**	
Labour	Angela Eileen Glanville	879	34.76%	
Liberal	Griffith Wynne Parry	217	8.58%	
Green	Nilesh Chauhan	180	7.12%	
Majority				
Turnout		2529	21.15%	
Liberal Democrats **hold**		Swing		

After the boundary change of 2004 the whole of Liverpool City Council faced election. Three Councillors were returned.

Liverpool City Council Municipal Elections 2004: Picton
Party	Candidate	Votes	%	±%
Liberal Democrats	**Andrew Makinson**	**1871**		
Liberal Democrats	**Ian Jobling**	**1782**		
Liberal Democrats	**Laurence Sidorczuk**	**1764**		
Labour	Angela Glanville	1192		
Labour	Denis Dunphy	1104		
Labour	Neville Bann	1054		
Majority				
Turnout		3253	26.32%	
Liberal Democrats **hold**		Swing	n/a	

• italics - Denotes the sitting Councillor.
• bold - Denotes the winning candidate.
