= Broadgreen =

Suburb of Liverpool, England

Coordinates: 53.4062°N 2.8965°W

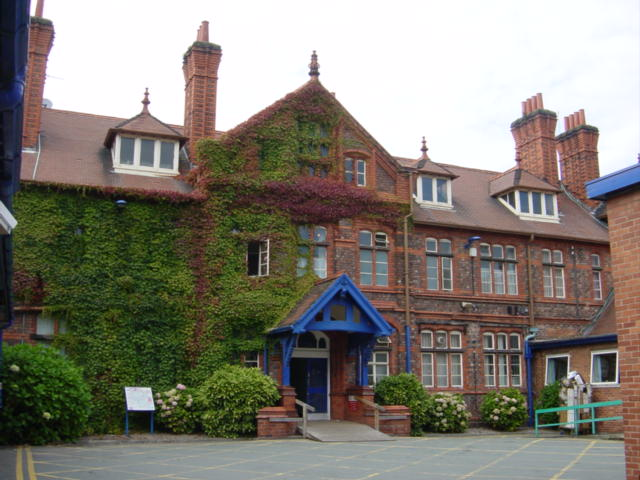
- The original entrance to Broadgreen Hospital

- Location within Merseyside
- Population: 14,889 (2001 Census)
- OS grid reference: SJ405903
- Metropolitan borough: Liverpool
- Metropolitan county: Merseyside
- Region: North West
- Country: England
- Sovereign state: United Kingdom
- Post town: LIVERPOOL
- Postcode district: L14
- Dialling code: 0151
- Police: Merseyside
- Fire: Merseyside
- Ambulance: North West
- UK Parliament: Liverpool Wavertree

Broadgreen (officially Broad Green) is an eastern suburb of Liverpool, Merseyside, England. On the edge of the city, it is bordered by Old Swan to the north-west, Knotty Ash to the north-east, Childwall to the south and, further east, Bowring Park. Until 2004, it was a Liverpool City Council ward.

== Description ==
Historically a part of Lancashire, Broadgreen is primarily a residential area, made up of semi-detached and detached houses. As a small district, it is often counted with Childwall or Knotty Ash which are larger suburbs of the city. It is home to Broadgreen Hospital, Broadgreen Primary School and Dixons Broadgreen Academy.

Broadgreen covers an area of just over a square mile (2.97 km^{2}) and in the 2001 Census had a population of 14,889 (6,919 males and 7,970 females).

== Transport ==
Situated close to the end of the M62 motorway, the area is served by Broad Green railway station, where regular trains depart for Liverpool city centre, Manchester, Wigan and St Helens.

== Notable people ==
The actor Chris Mason grew up in Broadgreen.
