= Woolton (ward) =

Former ward of Liverpool City Council (UK)

Coordinates: 53.3739°N 2.8646°W

- Woolton ward (2004) within Liverpool
- Population: 13,126 (2021 census)
- Registered Electors: 10,813 (2021 election)
- Metropolitan borough: City of Liverpool
- Metropolitan county: Merseyside
- Region: North West
- Country: England
- Sovereign state: United Kingdom
- UK Parliament: Garston and Halewood

Woolton ward was an electoral division of Liverpool City Council between 1953 and 1973, and 1980 and 2023. It and was centred on the Woolton district of Liverpool.

== Background ==
The ward was first formed in 1953. It was split up in 1973, reformed in 1980 and its boundaries were changed in 2004 before being dissolved in 2023.

=== 1953 boundaries ===
1953 boundaries

The ward was formed from the former Little Woolton and Much Woolton wards.

The ward was part of the Liverpool Garston Parliamentary constituency.

=== 1973 election ===
Following the Local Government Act 1972 the ward boundaries of the council were altered. The number of wards was reduced from 40 to 33 and the aldermanic system was abolished. Woolton was split into the Woolton East and Woolton West wards.

=== 1980 boundaries ===
1980 boundaries

A report of the Local Government Boundary Commission for England published in November 1978 set out proposals for changes to the wards of Liverpool City Council, maintaining the number of councillors at 99 representing 33 wards. Woolton ward was reestablished to be represented by three councillors.

The report describes the boundaries of Woolton ward as "Commencing at a point where Allerton Road (northern carriageway) meets Menlove Avenue, thence northwestwards along said avenue to the southern boundary of Church Ward, thence northeastwards along said boundary and northwestwards along the eastern boundary of said ward to the southern boundary of Childwall Ward, thence southeastwards along said boundary and generally northeastwards, northwestwards and northeastwards along the southeastern boundary of said ward to the southwestern boundary of Valley Ward, thence southeastwards along said boundary and the southwestern boundary of Netherley Ward to the eastern boundary of the City, thence southwestwards and southwards along said boundary to a point opposite Manor Way, thence westwards to and along said Way to North Manor Way, thence northwards and generally southwestwards along said way to Manor Way thence southwestwarde along said way to Manor Road, thence northwestwards along said road and Speke Road to High Street (Northern carriageway), thence southwestwards along said street and Allerton Road (northern carriageway) to the point of commencement".

The ward was part of the Liverpool Garston Parliamentary constituency.

=== 2004 boundaries ===
2004 ward boundaries

A review by the Boundary Committee for England recommended that the council was formed of a reduced number of 90 members elected from 30 wards. Woolton ward was changed to gain small parts of the former Allerton and Church wards, and losing a small part to the new Allerton and Hunts Cross (ward).

The ward boundaries follow the North Liverpool Extension Line, Out Lane, Kings Drive, Speke Road, School Lane, the southern boundary of Woolton Woods, Hillfoot Road, Menlove Avenue, Druid's Cross Road, Hornby Lane, Woolton Road, the southern boundary of Childwall Woods, Childwall Lane, the northern property line of Well Lane and Viewpark Close.

Until 2010 the ward was part of the Liverpool Garston Parliamentary constituency and from 2010 part of the Garston and Halewood Parliamentary constituency.

The population of the 2004 ward at the 2021 census was 13,126.

=== 2023 elections ===
Following a 2022 review by the Local Government Boundary Commission for England which decided that the existing 30 wards each represented by three Councillors should be replaced by 64 wards represented by 85 councillors, the ward was split up into the new Calderstones, Gateacre, Much Woolton and Hunts Cross, Woolton Village wards.

== Councillors ==
Election	Councillor	Councillor	Councillor
1953	J.B. Smart (Con)	Joseph Norton (Con)	G.F. Caitlin (Con)
1954	J.B. Smart (Con)	Joseph Norton (Con)	G.F. Caitlin (Con)
1955	J.B. Smart (Con)	Joseph Norton (Con)	G.F. Caitlin (Con)
1956	J.B. Smart (Con)	Joseph Norton (Con)	G.F. Caitlin (Con)
1957	James McAllister (Con)	Joseph Norton (Con)	G.F. Caitlin (Con)
1958	James McAllister (Con)	Joseph Norton (Con)	G.F. Caitlin (Con)
1959	James McAllister (Con)	Joseph Norton (Con)	G.F. Caitlin (Con)
1960	James McAllister (Con)	Joseph Norton (Con)	G.F. Caitlin (Con)
1961	James McAllister (Con)	Joseph Norton (Con)	G.F. Caitlin (Con)
1962	James McAllister (Con)	Joseph Norton (Con)	Leslie Williams (Con)
1963	James McAllister (Con)	Joseph Norton (Con)	Leslie Williams (Con)
1964	James McAllister (Con)	Joseph Norton (Con)	Leslie Williams (Con)
1965	James McAllister (Con)	Joseph Norton (Con)	Leslie Williams (Con)
1966	James McAllister (Con)	Joseph Norton (Con)	Leslie Williams (Con)
1967	James McAllister (Con)	Joseph Norton (Con)	Leslie Williams (Con)
1968	James McAllister (Con)	Joseph Norton (Con)	Leslie Williams (Con)
1969	James McAllister (Con)	Joseph Norton (Con)	Leslie Williams (Con)
1970	James McAllister (Con)	T.L. Norton (Con)	Leslie Williams (Con)
1971	James McAllister (Con)	T.L. Norton (Con)	A. Fletcher (Lab)
1972	L. Evans (Lab)	Leslie Williams (Con)	A. Fletcher (Lab)
1973-1979 see Woolton East and Woolton West
1980	Chris Hallows (Con)	Anthony McVeigh (Con)	Ruth Dean (Con)
1982	Chris Hallows (Con)	Anthony McVeigh (Con)	Ruth Dean (Con)
1983	Chris Hallows (Con)	Anthony McVeigh (Con)	Ruth Dean (Con)
1984	Chris Hallows (Con)	Anthony McVeigh (Con)	Ruth Dean (Con)
1986	Chris Hallows (Con)	Anthony McVeigh (Con)	Ruth Dean (Con)
1987	Chris Hallows (Con)	Pauline McKibbin (Alliance)	Ruth Dean (Con)
1988	Steve Fitzsimmons (Con)	Pauline McKibbin (Alliance)	J Backhouse (Con)
1990	Steve Fitzsimmons (Con)	Pauline McKibbin (Alliance)	J Backhouse (Con)
1991	Steve Fitzsimmons (Con)	Pauline McKibbin (SDP)	J Backhouse (Con)
1992	Steve Fitzsimmons (Con)	Pauline McKibbin (SDP)	J Backhouse (Con)
1994	Steve Fitzsimmons (Con)	Pauline McKibbin (SDP)	J Backhouse (Con)
1995	Steve Fitzsimmons (Con)	B Lewis (LD)	J Backhouse (Con)
1996	Steve Fitzsimmons (Con)	B Lewis (LD)	Malcolm Kelly (LD)
1998	Barbara Collinge (LD)	B Lewis (LD)	Malcolm Kelly (LD)
1999	Barbara Collinge (LD)	Barbara Mace (LD)	Malcolm Kelly (LD)
2000	Barbara Collinge (LD)	Barbara Mace (LD)	Malcolm Kelly (LD)
2002	Barbara Collinge (LD)	Barbara Mace (LD)	Malcolm Kelly (LD)
2003	Barbara Collinge (LD)	Barbara Mace (LD)	Malcolm Kelly (LD)
WARD REFORMED
2004	Barbara Collinge (LD)	Barbara Mace (LD)	Malcolm Kelly (LD)
2006	Barbara Collinge (LD)	Barbara Mace (LD)	Malcolm Kelly (LD)
2007	Barbara Collinge (LD)	Barbara Mace (LD)	Malcolm Kelly (LD)
2008	Barbara Collinge (LD)	Barbara Mace (LD)	Malcolm Kelly (LD)
2010	Barbara Collinge (LD)	Barbara Mace (LD)	Malcolm Kelly (LD)
2011	Barbara Collinge (LD)	Barbara Mace (LD)	Malcolm Kelly (LD)
2012	Mark Norris (Lab)	Barbara Mace (LD)	Malcolm Kelly (LD)
2014	Mark Norris (Lab)	Barbara Mace (LD)	Colin McAlley (Lab)
2015	Mark Norris (Lab)	Alice Bennett (Lab)	Colin McAlley (Lab)
2016	Malcolm Kelly (LD)	Alice Bennett (Lab)	Colin McAlley (Lab)
2018	Malcolm Kelly (LD)	Alice Bennett (Lab)	Kris Brown (LD)
2019	Malcolm Kelly (LD)	Barbara Mace (LD)	Kris Brown (LD)
2021	Malcolm Kelly (LD)	Barbara Mace (LD)	Kris Brown (LD)

indicates seat up for re-election after boundary changes.

indicates seat up for re-election.

indicates change in affiliation.

indicates seat up for re-election after casual vacancy.

== Election results ==
=== Elections of the 2020s ===
Thursday 6 May 2021
Party	Candidate	Votes	%	±%
**Liberal Democrats**	**Malcolm Kelly**	**2,081**	**46.62**	**▲3.05**
Labour	Alice Bennett	1,251	28.02	▼5.05
Conservative	Derek Thomas Nuttall	444	9.95	▲3.78
Liberal	Alan Hutchinson	357	8.00	N/A
Green	Ellie Pontin	331	7.41	▲0.71
Majority		830	18.59	▲8.09
Turnout		4,464	41.28	▼2.53
Rejected ballots		78	1.72	▲1.06
Total ballots		4,542	42.00	
Registered electors		10,813		
Liberal Democrats **hold**		Swing	+4.05	

=== Elections of the 2010s ===
Thursday 2 May 2019
Party	Candidate	Votes	%	±%
**Liberal Democrats**	**Barbara Mace**	**2,042**	**43.57**	**▼6.81**
Labour	Alice Bennett	1,550	33.07	▲0.38
Green	Jennifer Mary Brown	314	6.70	▲1.40
Conservative	Christopher David Thomas	289	6.17	▼5.27
Majority		492	10.50	▼7.18
Turnout		4,687	43.81	▲3.79
Rejected ballots		31	0.66	▲0.47
Total ballots		4,718	44.10	
Registered electors		10,699		
Liberal Democrats **gain** from Labour		Swing	-3.60	

Thursday 3rd May 2018
Party	Candidate	Votes	%	±%
**Liberal Democrats**	**Kris Brown**	**2,148**	**50.38**	**▲4.33**
Labour	Colin McAlley	1,394	32.69	▲3.61
Conservative	Adam Marsden	488	11.44	▲1.96
Green	Jennifer Mary Brown	226	5.30	▲1.44
Majority		754	17.68	▲0.71
Turnout		4,256	40.02	▼5.82
Rejected ballots		8	0.19	▼0.90
Total ballots		4,264	40.09	
Registered electors		10,636		
Liberal Democrats **gain** from Labour		Swing	+0.36	

Thursday 5th May 2016
Party	Candidate	Votes	%	±%
**Liberal Democrats**	**Malcolm Robert Kelly**	**2,206**	**46.05**	**▲20.83**
Labour	Mark Steven Norris	1,393	29.08	▼9.01
Conservative	Adam Ernest Marsden	454	9.48	▼11.30
Independent	Alan Hutchinson	236	4.93	N/A
UKIP	Vivienne Rosalind Beckett	220	4.59	▼4.18
Green	Jennifer Mary Brown	185	3.86	▼2.16
TUSC	Harry Smith	44	0.92	▼0.19
Majority		813	16.97	▲4.10
Turnout		4,738	45.84	▼24.55
Rejected ballots		52	1.09%	▲1.08
Total ballots		4,790	46.34	
Registered electors		10,337		
Liberal Democrats **gain** from Labour		Swing	+14.92	

Thursday 7th May 2015
Party	Candidate	Votes	%	±%
**Labour**	**Alice Bennett**	**2,836**	**38.09**	**▼0.42**
Liberal Democrats	Malcolm Kelly	1,878	25.22	▼8.38
Conservative	Adam Ernest Marsden	1,547	20.78	▲1.91
UKIP	Vivienne Beckett	653	8.77	N/A
Green	Frances Gina Muscatelli	448	6.02	▼0.63
TUSC	Harry Smith	83	1.11	N/A
Majority		958	12.87	▲7.96
Turnout		7,474	70.39	▲31.23
Rejected ballots		29	0.39%	
Total ballots		7,503	70.66	
Registered electors		10,618		
Labour **gain** from Liberal Democrats		Swing	+3.98	

Thursday 22nd May 2014
Party	Candidate	Votes	%	±%
**Labour**	**Colin McAlley**	**1,576**	**38.51**	**▲1.49**
Liberal Democrats	Malcolm Kelly	1,375	33.60	▼0.77
Conservative	Adam Marsden	772	18.87	▲1.29
Green	Ben Owen	272	6.65	▲3.12
Liberal	Maria Langley	97	2.37	▼0.20
Majority		201	4.91	▲2.27
Turnout		4,092	39.16	▼0.88
Labour **gain** from Liberal Democrats		Swing	+1.13	

Thursday 3rd May 2012
Party	Candidate	Votes	%	±%
**Labour**	**Mark Steven Norris**	**1,541**	**37.02**	**▲4.66**
Liberal Democrats	Kathryn Dadswell	1,431	34.37	▼3.01
Conservative	Adam Ernest Marsden	732	17.58	▼6.95
UKIP	Joseph Stanley Chiffers	205	4.92	N/A
Green	Fiona Margaret McGill Coyne	147	3.53	▲0.21
Liberal	Maria Langley	107	2.57	▲0.25
Majority		110	2.64	▼2.48
Turnout		4,163	40.04	▼5.23
Registered electors		10,395		
Labour **gain** from Liberal Democrats		Swing	+3.88	

Thursday 5th May 2011
Party	Candidate	Votes	%	±%
**Liberal Democrats**	**Barbara Mace**	**1,763**	**37.48**	**▼13.37**
Labour	Mary Aspinall	1,522	32.36	▲7.56
Conservative	Adam Ernest Marsden	1,154	24.53	▲3.00%
Green	Alexander Rudkin	156	3.32	▲0.49
Liberal	Maria Langley	109	2.32	N/A
Majority		241	5.12	▼20.93
Turnout		4,704	45.27	▼21.30
Registered electors		10,390		
Liberal Democrats **hold**		Swing	-20.93	

Thursday 6 May 2010
Party	Candidate	Votes	%	±%
**Liberal Democrats**	**Malcolm Kelly**	**3,543**	**50.85**	**▲4.44**
Labour	John Owen Fulham	1,728	24.80	▲9.81
Conservative	Richard Michael Downey	1,500	21.53	▼11.33
Green	Alexander Rudkin	197	2.83	▼1.39
Majority		1,815	26.05	▲12.50
Turnout		6,968	66.57	▲30.12
Registered electors		10,467		
Liberal Democrats **hold**		Swing	-7.28%	

=== Elections of the 2000s ===
Thursday 1 May 2008
Party	Candidate	Votes	%	±%
**Liberal Democrats**	**Barbara Collinge**	**1,771**	**46.41**	**▼10.92**
Conservative	Richard Michael Downey	1,254	32.86	▲11.79
Labour	Laurence Richard Freeman	572	14.99	▲1.05
Green	Alexander Rudkin	161	4.22	▼0.01
Liberal	Maria Langley	58	1.52	▼1.92
Majority		517	13.55	▼22.71
Turnout		3,816	36.45	▲2.80
Registered electors		10,468		
Liberal Democrats **hold**		Swing	-11.36	

Thursday 3 May 2007
Party	Candidate	Votes	%	±%
**Liberal Democrats**	**Barbara Mace**	**2,019**	**57.33**	**▲1.07**
Conservative	Stephen Fitzsimmons	742	21.07	▼0.53
Labour	Laurence Richard Freeman	491	13.94	▲0.76
Green	Alexander Rudkin	149	4.23	▼1.17
Liberal	Maria Langley	121	3.44	▼0.12
Majority		1,277	36.26	▲1.60
Turnout		3,522	33.65	▲0.64
Registered electors		10,466		
Liberal Democrats **hold**		Swing	+0.80	

Thursday 4 May 2006
Party	Candidate	Votes	%	±%
**Liberal Democrats**	**Malcolm Kelly**	**1,959**	**56.26**	
Conservative	Stephen Fitzsimmons	752	21.60	
Labour	Laurence Richard Freeman	459	13.18	
Green	Alexander Rudkin	188	5.40	
Liberal	Maria Langley	124	3.56	
Majority		1,207	34.66	
Turnout		3,482	33.01	
Registered electors		10,548		
Liberal Democrats **hold**		Swing		

Thursday 10 June 2004 (Note: After the boundary change of 2004 the whole of Liverpool City Council faced election. Three Councillors were returned.)
Party	Candidate	Votes	%	±%
**Liberal Democrats**	**Barbara Collinge**	**3,440**		
**Liberal Democrats**	**Barbara Mace**	**3,440**		
**Liberal Democrats**	**Malcolm Kelly**	**3,134**		
Conservative	Emlyn Williams	656		
Conservative	Stephen Fitzsimmons	599		
Labour	Maureen Freeman	594		
Conservative	Nanik Vaswani	589		
Labour	Laurence Freeman	571		
Majority				
Turnout		4,823	45.62	
Registered electors		10,571		
Liberal Democrats **win** (new seat)				
Liberal Democrats **win** (new seat)				
Liberal Democrats **win** (new seat)				

Thursday 1 May 2003
Party	Candidate	Votes	%	±%
**Liberal Democrats**	**Barbara Mace**	**2,186**	**68.38**	**▲1.73**
Conservative	Stephen Fitzsimmons	411	12.86	▼3.94
Labour	Francis Steer	392	12.26	▼0.40
Liberal	Maria Langley	112	3.50	▲2.36
Green	Naomi Rose	96	3.00	▲0.25
Majority		1,775	55.52	▲5.67
Turnout		3,197	26.58	▼5.85
Registered electors		12,029		
Liberal Democrats **hold**		Swing	+2.84	

Thursday 2 May 2002
Party	Candidate	Votes	%	±%
**Liberal Democrats**	**Barbara Collinge**	**2,622**	**66.65**	**▼6.60**
Conservative	S. Fitzsimmons	661	16.80	▲4.06
Labour	R. Keenan	498	12.66	▲3.22
Green	Ms. N. Rose	108	2.75	▲0.74
Liberal	Ms. V. Woodward	45	1.14	▼1.43
Majority		1,961	49.85	▼10.66
Turnout		3,934	32.43	▲4.88
Registered electors		12,129		
Liberal Democrats **hold**		Swing	-5.33	

Thursday 4 May 2000
Party	Candidate	Votes	%	±%
**Liberal Democrats**	**Malcolm Kelly**	**2,484**	**73.25**	**▼0.64**
Conservative	D. Nuttall	432	12.74	▲0.44
Labour	Ms. S. Kenwright	320	9.44	▼0.85
Liberal	Ms. M. Langley	87	2.57	▼0.96
Green	Ms. J. Brown	68	2.01	N/A
Majority		2,052	60.51	▼1.08
Turnout		3,391	27.55	▼5.58
Registered electors		12,310		
Liberal Democrats **hold**		Swing	-0.54	

=== Elections of the 1990s ===
Thursday 6 May 1999
Party	Candidate	Votes	%	±%
**Liberal Democrats**	**Barbara Mace**	**3,016**	**73.89**	**▲3.84**
Conservative	S. Fitsimmons	502	12.30	▼5.55
Labour	W. Braben	420	10.29	▲0.35
Liberal	Ms. M. Langley	144	3.53	▲1.37
Majority		2,514	61.59	▲9.39
Turnout		4,082	33.13	▼3.83
Registered electors		12,323		
Liberal Democrats **hold**		Swing	+4.69	

Thursday 7 May 1998
Party	Candidate	Votes	%	±%
**Liberal Democrats**	**Barbara Collinge**	**3,206**	**70.05**	**▲31.85**
Conservative	S. Fitzsimmons	817	17.85	▼10.67
Labour	Ms. B. Wilde	455	9.94	▼16.65
Liberal	G. Bellas	99	2.16	▼1.21
Majority		2,389	52.20	▲42.52
Turnout		4,577	36.96	▲0.36
Registered electors		12,384		
Liberal Democrats **gain** from Conservative		Swing	+21.26	

Thursday 2 May 1996
Party	Candidate	Votes	%	±%
**Liberal Democrats**	**Malcolm Kelly**	**1,725**	**38.20**	**▼0.50**
Conservative	Ms. H. Rigby	1,288	28.52	▲7.41
Labour	S. Owens	1,201	26.59	▼11.76
Liberal	Ms. M. Langley	152	3.37	▲1.53
Independent Liberal Democrat	T. Frazer	150	3.32	N/A
Majority		437	9.68	▲9.34
Turnout		4,516	36.60	▼9.40
Registered electors		12,340		
Liberal Democrats **gain** from Conservative		Swing	3.96	

Thursday 4 May 1995
Party	Candidate	Votes	%	±%
**Liberal Democrats**	**Ms. B. Lewis**	**1,910**	**38.70**	**▲5.46**
Labour	Ms. P. McKibben	1,893	38.35	▲9.44
Conservative	E. Williams	1,042	21.11	▼12.26
Liberal	Ms. M. Langley	91	1.84	▼2.63
Majority		17	0.34	▲
Turnout				▲0.21
Registered electors		12,345		
Liberal Democrats **gain** from Labour		Swing	-1.99	

Thursday 5 May 1994
Party	Candidate	Votes	%	±%
**Conservative**	**S. Fitzsimmons**	**1,790**	**33.37**	**▼9.61**
Liberal Democrats	Ms. B. Lewis	1,783	33.24	▲26.18
Labour	C. Evans	1,551	28.91	▲20.43
Liberal	Ms. A. Halewood	240	4.47	N/A
Majority		7	0.13	▼1.37
Turnout		5,364	42.98	▲1.82
Registered electors		12,481		
Conservative **hold**		Swing	-17.89	

Thursday 7 May 1992
Party	Candidate	Votes	%	±%
**Conservative**	**J. Backhouse**	**2,235**	**42.98**	**▲11.72**
SDP	H. Gibson	2,157	41.48	▼8.99
Labour	J. Lusk	441	8.48	▼1.19
Liberal Democrats	C. Hulme	367	7.06	▲0.22
Majority		78	1.50	▼17.70
Turnout		5,200	41.16	▼9.12
Registered electors		12,634		
Conservative **hold**		Swing	+10.36	

Thursday 2 May 1991
Party	Candidate	Votes	%	±%
**SDP**	**P. McKibbin**	**3,193**	**50.47**	**▲29.82**
Conservative	J. Mass	1,978	31.26	▲2.10
Labour	I. Harvey	612	9.67	▼8.51
Liberal Democrats	Ms. E. Jones	433	6.84	▼21.85
Green	Ms. J. Cantwell	111	1.75	▼1.56
Majority		1,215	19.20	▲18.74
Turnout		6,327	50.28	▼0.64
Registered electors		12,583		
SDP **hold**		Swing	+13.86	

Thursday 3 May 1990
Party	Candidate	Votes	%	±%
**Conservative**	**S. Fitzsimmons**	**1,831**	**29.16**	**▼9.44**
SLD	B. Brown	1,802	28.69	▲3.79
SDP	D. Pollard	1,297	20.65	N/A
Labour	A. Gallagher	1,142	18.18	▲0.48
Green	Ms. J. Cantwell	208	3.31	▲0.51
Majority		29	0.46	▼10.94
Turnout		6,280	50.92	▼5.59
Registered electors		12,318		
Conservative **hold**		Swing	-6.62	

=== Elections of the 1980s ===
Thursday 5 May 1988
Party	Candidate	Votes	%	±%
**Conservative**	**J. Backhouse**	**2,310**	**38.6**	
**Conservative**	**S. Fitzsimmons**	**2,241**		
SLD	Ron Gould	1,487	24.9	
SLD	Ian Phillips	1,424		
Labour	A. White	1,057	17.7	
Labour	S. Balmer	1,056		
SDP	Ms. S. Parry	962	16.1	N/A
SDP	D. Pollard	873		N/A
Green	J. Hulton	166	2.8	N/A
Majority		823	11.40	▼2.50
Turnout		7,218	56.51	
Registered electors		12,772		
Conservative **hold**		Swing	+0.48	
Conservative **hold**		Swing		

Thursday 7 May 1987
Party	Candidate	Votes	%	±%
**Alliance**	**Pauline McKibbin**	**3,635**	**49.62**	**▲9.41**
Conservative	A. McVeigh	2,632	35.93	▼9.36
Labour	C.B. Cole	951	12.98	▲0.46
Green	D. Lindsay	107	1.46	▼0.52
Majority		1,003	13.69	▲8.61
Turnout		7,325	56.92	
Registered electors		12,868		
Liberal **gain** from Conservative		Swing	+9.39	

Thursday 8 May 1986
Party	Candidate	Votes	%	±%
**Conservative**	**Christopher Hallows**	**2,989**	**45.29**	**▼23.21**
Alliance	E. Jones	2,654	40.21	▲26.34
Labour	G. Casey	826	12.52	▼5.10
Green	D. Lindsay	131	1.98	N/A
Majority		335	5.08	▼45.80
Turnout		6,600		
Registered electors				
Conservative **hold**		Swing	-24.78	

Thursday 3 May 1984
Party	Candidate	Votes	%	±%
**Conservative**	**Ruth Dean**	**4,696**	**68.50**	**▼2.86**
Labour	R.J. Lafferty	1,208	17.62	▼2.97
Liberal	D.E. Huish	951	13.87	▲6.08
Majority		3,488	50.88	▲5.82
Turnout		6,855	53.32	▲11.65
Registered electors		12,857		
Conservative **hold**		Swing	+2.92	

Thursday 5 May 1983
Party	Candidate	Votes	%	±%
**Conservative**	**A. McVeigh**	**3,498**	**65.64**	**▲12.37**
Labour	H.G. Kilduff	1,097	20.59	▲4.05
Liberal	J. Joyce	415	7.79	▼19.90
SDP	R. Carrick	319	5.99	N/A
Majority		2,401	45.06	▲19.47
Turnout		5,329	41.67	▲6.76
Registered electors		12,790		
Conservative **hold**		Swing	+4.16	

Thursday 6 May 1982
Party	Candidate	Votes	%	±%
**Conservative**	**C.G. Hallows**	**2,384**	**53.27**	**▼19.15**
Liberal	E.M. Clein	1,239	27.69	▲18.94
Labour	D.A. Bradbury	740	16.54	▼2.30
Ecology	N. Everard	112	N/A	
Majority		1,145	25.59	▼28.02
Turnout		4,475	34.91	▼6.95
Registered electors		12,817		
Conservative **hold**		Swing	-19.04	

Thursday 6 May 1980
Party	Candidate	Votes	%	±%
**Conservative**	**Ruth Dean**	**3,883**	**72.42**	
**Conservative**	**Anthony McVeigh**	**3,798**	**70.83**	
**Conservative**	**Christopher Geoffrey Hallows**	**3,770**	**70.31**	
Labour	Philip Richard Martin	1,010	18.84	
Labour	Owen McDonough	998	18.61	
Labour	David Alan Bradbury	923	17.21	
Liberal	Philip Martin Freeman	469	8.75	
Liberal	Richard Powell	438	8.17	
Liberal	Ann Ryan	423	7.89	
Majority		2,873	53.61	
Turnout		5,362	41.86	
Registered electors		12,808		
Conservative **win** (new seat)				
Conservative **win** (new seat)				
Conservative **win** (new seat)				

=== Elections of the 1970s ===
Thursday 3 May 1972
Party	Candidate	Votes	%	±%
**Labour**	**L. Evans**	**4,834**	**50.33**	**▼3.85**
**Conservative**	**L.B. Williams**	**4,771**	**49.67**	**▲3.85**
Conservative	C.G. Hallows	4,600	47.89	▲2.07
Labour	K. Simpson	4,561	47.49	▼6.69
Majority		63	0.66	▼7.69
Turnout		9,605	31.62	▲3.51
Registered electors		30,380		
Conservative **hold**		Swing		
Labour **gain** from Conservative		Swing		

Thursday 13 May 1971
Party	Candidate	Votes	%	±%
**Labour**	**A. Fletcher**	**4,204**	**54.18**	**▲24.46**
Conservative	L.B. Williams	3,556	45.82	▼24.46
Majority		648	8.35	▼32.22
Turnout		7,760	28.11	▼1.75
Registered electors		27,610		
Conservative **hold**		Swing	+24.46	

Thursday 7 May 1970
Party	Candidate	Votes	%	±%
**Conservative**	**Mrs T.L. Norton**	**5,045**	**70.28**	**▼13.83**
Labour	Tony Mulhearn	2,133	29.72	▲13.83
Majority		2,912	40.57	▼27.64
Turnout		7,178	29.86	▲2.76
Registered electors		24,035		
Conservative **hold**		Swing	-13.83	

=== Elections of the 1960s ===
Thursday 8 May 1969
Party	Candidate	Votes	%	±%
**Conservative**	**James McAllister**	**4,752**	**84.11**	**▼3.84**
Labour	Robert C. Evans	898	15.89	▲3.84
Majority		3,854	68.21	▼7.69
Turnout		5,650	27.10	▼1.08
Registered electors		20,849		
Conservative **hold**		Swing	-3.84	

Thursday 9 May 1968
Party	Candidate	Votes	%	±%
**Conservative**	**Leslie B. Williams**	**4,802**	**87.95**	**▲8.75**
Labour	James M. Burke	658	12.05	▼8.70
Majority		4,144	75.90	▲17.40
Turnout		5,460	28.18	▼8.56
Registered electors		19,373		
Conservative **hold**		Swing	+8.72	

Thursday 11 May 1967
Party	Candidate	Votes	%	±%
**Conservative**	**Joseph Norton**	**5,606**	**79.2**	**▲3.98**
Labour	George J. Maudsley	1,468	20.75	▼3.98
Majority		4,138	58.50	▲7.96
Turnout		7,074	36.74	▲8.93
Registered electors		19,254		
Conservative **hold**		Swing	+3.98	

Thursday 12 May 1966
Party	Candidate	Votes	%	±%
**Conservative**	**J. McAllister**	**4,051**	**75.27**	**▲1.17**
Labour	L.A. Boner	1,331	24.73	▼1.17
Majority		2,720	50.54	▲2.34
Turnout		5,382	27.81	▼4.38
Registered electors		19,352		
Conservative **hold**		Swing	+1.17	

Thursday 13 May 1965
Party	Candidate	Votes	%	±%
**Conservative**	**L.B. Williams**	**4,495**	**74.10**	**▲12.57**
Labour	G.R. Sullivan	1,571	25.90	▼2.13
Majority		2,924	48.20	▲14.70
Turnout		6,066	32.19	▼4.01
Registered electors		18,845		
Conservative **hold**		Swing	+7.35	

Thursday 7 May 1964
Party	Candidate	Votes	%	±%
**Conservative**	**J. Norton**	**4,000**	**61.53**	**▲11.57**
Labour	G.R. Sullivan	1,822	28.03	▲5.01
Liberal	J. Deaves	679	10.44	▼13.58
Majority		2,178	33.50	▲9.56
Turnout		6,501	36.20	▼9.73
Registered electors		17,959		
Conservative **hold**		Swing	+3.28	

Thursday 9 May 1963
Party	Candidate	Votes	%	±%
**Conservative**	**J. McAllister**	**4,000**	**49.96**	**▼15.76**
Labour	S.J. Cook	2,083	23.02	▼8.26
Liberal	R.S. Hale	1,923	24.02	N/A
Majority		1,917	23.94	▼7.50
Turnout		8,006	45.93	▲16.63
Registered electors		17,432		
Conservative **hold**		Swing	-3.75	

Thursday 10 May 1962
Party	Candidate	Votes	%	±%
**Conservative**	**L.B. Williams**	**3,294**	**65.72**	**▼6.87**
Labour	J.F. Cloherty	1,718	34.28	▲6.87
Majority		1,576	31.44	▼13.73
Turnout		5,012	29.30	▲0.52
Registered electors		17,108		
Conservative **hold**		Swing	-6.87	

Thursday 11 May 1961
Party	Candidate	Votes	%	±%
**Conservative**	**J. Norton**	**3,445**	**72.59**	**▼7.30**
Labour	J.F. Cloherty	1,301	27.41	▲7.30
Majority		2,144	45.17	▼14.62
Turnout		4,746	28.78	▲1.53
Registered electors		16,490		
Conservative **hold**		Swing	-7.30	

Thursday 12 May 1960
Party	Candidate	Votes	%	±%
**Conservative**	**J. McAllister**	**3,445**	**79.89**	**▲5.05**
Labour	W. Lungley	867	20.11	▼5.05
Majority		2,578	59.79	▲10.11
Turnout		4,312	27.25	▼10.24
Registered electors		15,824		
Conservative **hold**		Swing	+5.05	

=== Elections of the 1950s ===
Thursday 7 May 1959
Party	Candidate	Votes	%	±%
**Conservative**	**G. F. Caitlin**	**4,215**	**74.84**	**▲6.20**
Labour	W. Lungley	1,417	25.16	▼6.20
Majority		2,798	49.68	▲12.40
Turnout		5,632	37.49	▲2.31
Registered electors		15,021		
Conservative **hold**		Swing	+6.20	

Thursday 8 May 1958
Party	Candidate	Votes	%	±%
**Conservative**	**J. Norton**	**3,476**	**68.64**	**▼4.67**
Labour	P. Grannell	1,588	31.36	▲4.67
Majority		1,888	37.28	▼9.33
Turnout		5,064	35.18	▼2.40
Registered electors		14,395		
Conservative **hold**		Swing	-4.67	

Thursday 9 May 1957
Party	Candidate	Votes	%	±%
**Conservative**	**J. McAllister**	**3,507**	**73.31**	**▼2.71**
Labour	J. Mottram	1,277	26.69	▲2.71
Majority		2,230	46.61	▼5.43
Turnout		4,784	37.58	▲4.55
Registered electors		12,729		
Conservative **hold**		Swing	-2.71	

Thursday 10 May 1956
Party	Candidate	Votes	%	±%
**Conservative**	**G.F. Caitlin**	**3,145**	**76.02**	**▼1.48**
Labour	Charles Patrick Wall	992	23.98	▲1.48
Majority		2,153	52.04	▼2.96
Turnout		4,137	33.03	▼12.07
Registered electors		12,525		
Conservative **hold**		Swing	-1.48	

Thursday 12 May 1955
Party	Candidate	Votes	%	±%
**Conservative**	**J. Norton**	**4,250**	**77.50**	**▲8.08**
Labour	Charles Patrick Wall	1,234	22.50	▼8.08
Majority		3,016	55.00	▲16.16
Turnout		5,484	45.10	▲2.42
Registered electors		12,160		
Conservative **hold**		Swing	+8.08	

Thursday 13 May 1954
Party	Candidate	Votes	%	±%
**Conservative**	**J.B. Smart**	**3,546**	**69.42**	**▲1.47**
Labour	T. McNerney	1,562	30.58	▼1.47
Majority		1,984	38.84	▲2.95
Turnout		5,108	42.68	▼9.76
Registered electors		11,969		
Conservative **hold**		Swing	+1.47	

Thursday 7 May 1953
Party	Candidate	Votes	%	±%
**Conservative**	**G.F. Caitlin**	**4,161**	**67.95**	
**Conservative**	**J. Norton**	**4,128**	**67.41**	
**Conservative**	**J.B. Smart**	**4,096**	**66.88**	
Labour	Mrs R.M. Checkett	1,963	32.05	
Labour	T. Churchill	1,958	31.97	
Labour	I. Cocker	1,904	31.09	
Majority		2,198	35.89	
Turnout		6,124	52.44	
Registered electors		11,679		
Conservative **win** (new seat)				
Conservative **win** (new seat)				
Conservative **win** (new seat)				

• italics - Denotes the sitting Councillor.
•bold - Denotes the winning candidate.

== See also ==
- Liverpool City Council
- Liverpool City Council elections 1880–present
- Liverpool Town Council elections 1835 - 1879
