= Croxteth (Liverpool ward) =

Metropolitan borough council ward in Liverpool, England

Coordinates: 53.4552°N 2.8985°W

- Croxteth ward within Liverpool
- Population: 6,703 (2021 census)
- Registered Electors: 4,344 (2023 election)
- Metropolitan borough: City of Liverpool
- Metropolitan county: Merseyside
- Region: North West
- Country: England
- Sovereign state: United Kingdom
- UK Parliament: Liverpool West Derby
- Councillors: Anthony Lavelle (Labour Party)

Croxteth ward is an electoral division of Liverpool City Council. The ward is in the Liverpool West Derby parliamentary constituency.

== Background ==
The ward was created in 1953 where it returned three councillors. The boundaries of the ward were changed for the 1973, 1980, 2004 and 2023 elections.

=== 1980 boundaries ===
1980 ward boundaries

A report of the Local Government Boundary Commission for England published in November 1978 set out proposals for changes to the wards of Liverpool City Council, maintaining the number of councillors at 99 representing 33 wards. Croxteth ward was represented by three councillors.

The report describes the boundaries as "Commencing at a point where Alder Road meets the road known as Queens Drive Stoneycroft, thence northwestwards along said Queens Drive Stoneycroft and the northeastern boundary of Tuebrook Ward to the southeastern boundary of Clubmoor Ward, thence northeastwards along said boundary and continuing northeastwards and southeastwards along the southern boundary of Gillmoss Ward to the unnamed road being a continuation northeastwards of Deysbrook Lane, thence southwestwards along said unnamed road and said Deysbrook Lane to Leyfield Road, thence southeastwards along said road to Honey's Green Lane, thence southwestwards along said lane to Alder Road, thence generally southwestwards along said road to the point of commencement".

=== 2004 boundaries ===
2004 ward boundaries

A review by the Boundary Committee for England recommended that the council was formed of a reduced number of 90 members elected from 30 wards.

Croxteth ward saw significant changes as the pre-2004 Croxteth ward was based around West Derby village, which became West Derby ward with only small parts in the new Croxteth ward as well as the Knotty Ash, Tuebrook and Stoneycroft and Yew Tree wards. The new ward was based on the Croxteth 'Council' estate and the Croxteth Country Park estate formerly covered by Gillmoss ward.

The ward boundaries followed the East Lancashire Road, the city boundary, the southern edge of Croxteth Country Park, Croxteth Hall Lane, the western property boundary of Elwick Drive, the southern boundary of the De La Salle Academy playing fields, and Dwerryhouse Lane.

The population of the 2004 ward at the 2011 census was 14,561, and at the 2021 census of 14,432.

=== 2023 boundaries ===
The ward boundary was changed in 2023 taking the northern half of the previous Croxteth ward. The new ward is represented by one councillor.

The ward boundaries follow the East Lancashire Road, the city boundary with Knowsley, the northwestern edge of Craven Wood, the northeastern edge of Dam Wood, the River Alt, Oak Lane North, Croxteth Hall Lane, the southern property line on Carr Lane East, then Worrow Road, Storrington Avenue and Lower House Lane.

The population of the ward at the 2021 census was 6,703.

== Councillors ==
Election	Councillor	Councillor	Councillor
1953	J.G. Hughes (Con)	T.H. Thompson (Con)	N.A. Williams (Con)
1954	J.G. Hughes (Con)	T.H. Thompson (Con)	N.A. Williams (Con)
1955	J.G. Hughes (Con)	T.H. Thompson (Con)	N.A. Williams (Con)
1956	J.G. Hughes (Con)	T.H. Thompson (Con)	F Bidston (Con)
1957	J.E. Thompson (Con)	T.H. Thompson (Con)	F Bidston (Con)
1958	J.E. Thompson (Con)	T.H. Thompson (Con)	F Bidston (Con)
1959	J.E. Thompson (Con)	T.H. Thompson (Con)	C Dickinson (Con)
1960	J.E. Thompson (Con)	T.H. Thompson (Con)	C Dickinson (Con)
1961	J.E. Thompson (Con)	A. Morrow (Con)	C Dickinson (Con)
1962	J.E. Thompson (Con)	A. Morrow (Con)	C Dickinson (Con)
1963	Alexander Audley (Con)	A. Morrow (Con)	C Dickinson (Con)
1964	Alexander Audley (Con)	A. Morrow (Con)	C Dickinson (Con)
1965	Alexander Audley (Con)	A. Morrow (Con)	C Dickinson (Con)
1966	Alexander Audley (Con)	A. Morrow (Con)	C Dickinson (Con)
1967	Alexander Audley (Con)	George Prince (Con)	C Dickinson (Con)
1968	Alexander Audley (Con)	George Prince (Con)	C Dickinson (Con)
1969	Alexander Audley (Con)	George Prince (Con)	C Dickinson (Con)
1970	Alexander Audley (Con)	George Prince (Con)	C Dickinson (Con)
1971	Alexander Audley (Con)	George Prince (Con)	T Larty (Con)
1972	K.W. Hart (Lib)	George Prince (Con)	T Larty (Con)
WARD REFORMED
1973	W.T. Brodie (Lib)	T. Blyde (Lib)	J. Holmes (Lib)
1975	Ivan Clews (Lib)	T. Blyde (Lib)	J. Holmes (Lib)
1976	Ivan Clews (Lib)	Geoffrey Brandwood (Con)	J. Holmes (Lib)
1978	Ivan Clews (Lib)	Geoffrey Brandwood (Con)	Ernest Fitzpatrick (Con)
1979	Frederick Butler (Con)	Geoffrey Brandwood (Con)	Ernest Fitzpatrick (Con)
WARD REFORMED
1980	Ernest Fitzpatrick (Con)	Frederick Butler (Con)	Geoffrey Brandwood (Con)
1982	Ernest Fitzpatrick (Con)	Frederick Butler (Con)	Geoffrey Brandwood (Con)
1983	Ernest Fitzpatrick (Con)	Frederick Butler (Con)	Geoffrey Brandwood (Con)
1984	Ernest Fitzpatrick (Con)	Frederick Butler (Con)	Geoffrey Brandwood (Con)
1986	Gillian Bundred (Lib)	Frederick Butler (Con)	Geoffrey Brandwood (Con)
1987	Gillian Bundred (Lib)	JJ Cunningham (SDP)	Geoffrey Brandwood (Con)
1988	Gillian Bundred (Lib)	JJ Cunningham (SDP)	Elaine Kinahan (SLD)
1990	Gillian Bundred (LD)	JJ Cunningham (SDP)	Elaine Kinahan (LD)
1991	Gillian Bundred (LD)	Norman Mills (LD)	Elaine Kinahan (LD)
1992	Gillian Bundred (LD)	Norman Mills (LD)	Elaine Kinahan (LD)
1994	Ann Hines (LD)	Norman Mills (LD)	Elaine Kinahan (LD)
1995	Ann Hines (LD)	Norman Mills (LD)	Elaine Kinahan (LD)
1996	Ann Hines (LD)	Norman Mills (LD)	Elaine Kinahan (LD)
1998	Ann Hines (LD)	Norman Mills (LD)	Elaine Kinahan (LD)
1999	Ann Hines (LD)	Norman Mills (LD)	Elaine Kinahan (LD)
2000	Ann Hines (LD)	Norman Mills (LD)	Stuart Monkcom (LD)
2002	Ann Hines (LD)	Norman Mills (LD)	Stuart Monkcom (LD)
2003	Ann Hines (LD)	Norman Mills (LD)	Stuart Monkcom (LD)
WARD REFORMED
2004	Nadia Stewart (Lab)	Alan Fearehough (Lab)	Rose Bailey (Lab)
2006	Nadia Stewart (Lab)	Alan Fearehough (Lab)	Rose Bailey (Lab)
2007	Nadia Stewart (Lab)	Phil Moffatt (LD)	Rose Bailey (Lab)
2008	Nadia Stewart (LD)	Phil Moffatt (LD)	Rose Bailey (Lab)
2010	Peter Mitchell (Lab)	Phil Moffatt (LD)	Rose Bailey (Lab)
2010	Peter Mitchell (Lab)	Steph Till (Lab)	Martin Cummins (Lab)
2011	Peter Mitchell (Lab)	Steph Till (Lab)	Martin Cummins (Lab)
2012	Peter Mitchell (Lab)	Steph Till (Lab)	Martin Cummins (Lab)
2014	Peter Mitchell (Lab)	Steph Till (Lab)	Martin Cummins (Ind)
2015	Peter Mitchell (Lab)	Joann Kushner (Lab)	Martin Cummins (Ind)
2016	Peter Mitchell (Lab)	Joann Kushner (Lab)	Anthony Lavelle (Lab)
2018	Peter Mitchell (Lab)	Joann Kushner (Lab)	Anthony Lavelle (Lab)
2019	Peter Mitchell (Lab)	Joann Kushner (Lab)	Anthony Lavelle (Lab)
2021	Peter Mitchell (Ind)	Carol Sung (Lab)	Anthony Lavelle (Lab)
WARD REFORMED
2023	Anthony Lavelle (Lab)		

- Nadia Stewart (elected as Labour) sat as an Independent member of the council for part of 2007 before defecting to the Liberal Democrats on the evening of the 2008 elections allowing the Liberal Democrat administration to retain a slender majority on the council.
- Martin Cummins (elected as Labour) sat as an Independent member of the council from 2014 to 2016 after the Leader of the Labour Party was photographed holding the Sun newspaper.
- Peter Mitchell (elected as Labour) sat as an Independent member of the council from 2021 after "allowing his membership [of the Labour Party] to lapse".

indicates seat up for re-election after boundary changes.

indicates seat up for re-election.

indicates change in affiliation.

indicates seat up for re-election after casual vacancy.

== Election results ==
=== Elections of the 2020s ===
4th May 2023
Party	Candidate	Votes	%	±%
**Labour**	**Anthony Lavelle (Note: Anthony Lavelle was a re-standing councillor for the former Croxteth ward.)**	**740**	**82.50**	
Independent	Maurice Sherman	89	9.92	
Liberal Democrats	Bill Barrow	68	7.58	
Majority		651	72.58	
Turnout		897	20.65	
Rejected ballots		4	0.44	
Total ballots		901	20.74	
Registered electors		4,344		
Labour **win** (new seat)				

A by-election was held alongside the ordinary election on 6 May 2023 following the resignation of Cllr Joanne Kushner (elected 2019, Labour).

Liverpool City Council Municipal Elections 2021:6th May 2021
Party	Candidate	Votes	%	±%
**Labour**	**Anthony Lavelle**	**1,643**		
**Labour**	**Carol Sung**	**1,230**		
Liberal	Ray Catesby	382		
Liberal	Tom Doolan	378		
Green	Nicola Jane Stewart	243		
Green	Nicola Jane Stewart	236		
Conservative	Johnathan Andrew	196		
Liberal Democrats	Pamela Clein	170		
Liberal Democrats	Kay Davies	169		
Conservative	Johnathan Andrew	154		
Majority				
Turnout				
Registered electors		10,601		
Rejected ballots		37		
Labour **hold**		Swing		
Labour **hold**		Swing		

=== Elections of the 2010s ===
Liverpool City Council Municipal Elections 2019: 2nd May 2019
Party	Candidate	Votes	%	±%
**Labour**	**Joann Kushner**	**1,670**	**73.12**	**▼9.76**
Green	Rachael Joanne Blackman-Stretton	215	9.41	▲5.54
Conservative	Alice Margaret Day	146	6.39	▼0.33
Liberal	Ray Catesby	128	5.60	▲2.63
Liberal Democrats	Bill Barrow	125	5.47	▲1.91
Majority		1,455	63.70	▼12.45
Turnout		2,318	22.01	▼2.30
Registered electors		10,532		
Rejected ballots		34	1.47	▲1.12
Labour **hold**		Swing	-7.65	

Liverpool City Council Municipal Elections 2018: 3rd May 2018
Party	Candidate	Votes	%	±%
**Labour**	**Peter Mitchell**	**2,120**	**82.88**	**▲9.02**
Conservative	Alice Margaret Day	172	6.72	▲3.78
Green	Martin Trevor Randall	99	3.87	▲0.59
Liberal Democrats	Richard Pendril Bentall	91	3.56	▼0.91
Liberal	Raymond Frank Catesby	76	2.97	▼0.83
Majority		1,948	76.15	▲12.01
Turnout		2,567	24.31	▼2.15
Registered electors		10,558		
Rejected ballots		9	0.35	
Labour **hold**		Swing	2.62	

Liverpool City Council Municipal Elections 2016: 5th May 2016
Party	Candidate	Votes	%	±%
**Labour**	**Anthony Lavelle**	**1,984**	**73.86**	**▲1.21**
UKIP	John David Sisson	261	9.72	▼0.33
Liberal Democrats	Angela Hulme	120	4.47	▼0.90
Liberal	John James McBridge	102	3.80	▲2.15
Green	Yasmin Gasimova	88	3.28	▼0.39
Conservative	Denise Mary Nuttall	79	2.94	▼1.59
TUSC	Rebecca Elizabeth McCourt	52	1.94	▼0.15
Majority		1,723	64.14	▲1.54
Registered electors		10,287		
Turnout		2,722	26.46	▼36.38
Labour **gain** from Independent		Swing	n/a	

Liverpool City Council Municipal Elections 2015: 7th May 2015
Party	Candidate	Votes	%	±%
Labour	**Joann Kushner**	4,765	72.65%	+6.32%
UKIP	Mark Andrew Leavesley	659	10.05%	−11.92%
Liberal Democrats	Paul Twigger	352	5.37%	n/a
Conservative	Beryl Pinnington	297	4.53%	+0.59%
Green	Lewis Coyne	241	3.67%	−0.79%
TUSC	Mary Ann Wheeler	137	2.09%	n/a
Liberal	John James McBridge	108	1.65%	−1.65%
Majority		4,106	62.60%	−18.24%
Turnout		6,588	62.84%	+35.57%
Labour **hold**		Swing	9.12%	

Liverpool City Council Municipal Elections 2014: 22nd May 2014
Party	Candidate	Votes	%	±%
Labour	**Peter Mitchell**	1,887	66.33%	+0.74%
UKIP	Mark Leavesley	625	21.97%	n/a
Green	Don Ross	127	4.46%	+2.30%
Conservative	Giselle Henrietta McDonald	112	3.94%	+1.56%
Liberal	John James McBridge	94	3.30%	+1.46%
Majority		1,262	44.36%	−6.47%
Turnout		2845	27.27%	+0.32%
Labour **hold**		Swing		

Liverpool City Council Municipal Elections 2012: 3rd May 2012
Party	Candidate	Votes	%	±%
Labour	**Martin Cummins**	1,822	65.59%	−2.97%
Socialist Labour	Kai Andersen	410	14.76%	+9.79%
Liberal Democrats	Mark Coughlin	283	10.19%	−7.10%
English Democrat	Lee Alan Walton	86	3.10%	n/a%
Conservative	Brenda Coppell	66	2.38%	−1.55%
Green	Don Ross	60	2.16%	+0.37%
Liberal	John James McBride	51	1.84%	−0.23%
Majority		1,412	50.83%	−0.44%
Turnout		2,778	26.95%	−3.44%
Labour **hold**		Swing	-6.38%	

Liverpool City Council Municipal Elections 2011: 5th May 2011
Party	Candidate	Votes	%	±%
Labour	**Stephanie Till**	**2181**	**68.56%**	
Liberal Democrats	Mark Anthony Coughlin	550	17.29%	
Socialist Labour	Kai Andersen	158	4.97%	
Conservative	Brenda Coppell	125	3.93%	
Liberal	John James McBride	66	2.07%	
Green	Donald Ross	57	1.79%	
BNP	Peter Tierney	44	1.38	
Majority		1631	51.27%	
Turnout		3181	30.39%	

Following the death of Cllr Rose Bailey and the resignation of Cllr Phil Moffat a dual by-election was held on 18 November 2010. Two candidates were returned:

Croxteth By-Election 18 November 2010
Party	Candidate	Votes	%	±%
Labour	**Martin Cummins**	**1447**	**31.85%**	
Labour	**Stephanie Till**	**1424**	**31.34%**	
Liberal Democrats	Mark Coughlin	611	13.45%	
Liberal Democrats	Michael Marner	479	10.54%	
Socialist Labour	Kai Andersen	135	2.97%	
BNP	Peter Tierney	117	2.58%	
Socialist Labour	Barbara Bryan	70	1.54%	
Green	Eleanor Pontin	63	1.39%	
UKIP	Tony Hammond	50	1.10%	
English Democrat	Paul Rimmer	35	0.77%	
English Democrat	Steven McEllenborough	33	0.73%	
Conservative	Norman Coppell	31	0.68%	
Conservative	Brenda Coppell	29	0.64%	
UKIP	Michael Lane	19	0.42%	
Majority				
Turnout		4543	21.42%	
Labour **hold**		Swing		
Labour **gain** from Liberal Democrats		Swing		

Liverpool City Council Municipal Elections 2010: Croxteth
Party	Candidate	Votes	%	±%
Labour	**Peter Mitchell**	**3307**	**57.10%**	
Liberal Democrats	Mark Coughlin	1711	29.54%	
Conservative	Grace Charlotte Tyldsley	271	4.68%	
Socialist Labour	Kai Andersen	244	4.21%	
Liberal	Michael Morgan	181	3.13%	
Green	Don Ross	78	1.35%	
Majority				
Turnout		5792	54.62%	
Labour **hold**		Swing		

=== Elections of the 2000s ===
Liverpool City Council Municipal Elections 2008: Croxteth
Party	Candidate	Votes	%	±%
Labour	**Rose Bailey**	**1810**	**51.71%**	
Liberal Democrats	Stephen Geoghegan	1245	35.57%	
Independent	Ken Stewart	171	4.89%	
BNP	George Muse	109	3.11%	
Conservative	Diane Joyce Westwell	88	2.51%	
Green	Don Ross	77	2.20%	
Majority				
Turnout		3500	33.35%	
Labour **hold**		Swing		

Liverpool City Council Municipal Elections 2007: Croxteth
Party	Candidate	Votes	%	±%
Liberal Democrats	**Philip Moffatt**	**1246**	**45.61%**	
Labour	Jim Noakes	1236	45.24%	
Green	Anne Graham	121	4.43%	
Conservative	Diane Joyce Westwell	90	3.29%	
Liberal	Susan O'Brien	39	1.43%	
Majority				
Turnout		2732	26.36%	
Liberal Democrats **gain** from Labour		Swing		

Liverpool City Council Municipal Elections 2006: Croxteth
Party	Candidate	Votes	%	±%
Labour	**Nadia Stewart**	**1804**	**61.49%**	
Liberal Democrats	Patrick Moloney	902	30.74%	
Green	Anne Graham	151	5.15%	
Liberal	Mary Jane Canning	77	2.62%	
Majority				
Turnout		2934	27.78%	
Labour **hold**		Swing		

After the boundary change of 2004 the whole of Liverpool City Council faced election. Three Councillors were returned.

Liverpool City Council Municipal Elections 2004: Croxteth
Party	Candidate	Votes	%	±%
Labour	**Rosemary Bailey**	**1749**		
Labour	**Alan Fearehough**	**1426**		
Labour	**Nadia Stewart**	**1379**		
Liberal Democrats	Pamela Clein	1350		
Liberal Democrats	Patrick Moloney	1326		
Liberal Democrats	James Gaskell	1248		
Liverpool Labour	Anthony Jennings	324		
Liverpool Labour	John Jones	315		
Liverpool Labour	Henry Bennett	303		
Conservative	Audrey Bowness	170		
Green	Anne Graham	165		
Liberal	Beryl Ackers	127		
Liberal	Francis Porter	91		
Socialist Labour	Violet Shaw	90		
Liberal	Jean Worrall	82		
Majority				
Turnout		3791	35.67%	
Labour **hold**		Swing	n/a	

• italics – Denotes sitting Councillor.

• bold – Denotes the winning candidate
