= 1960 Liverpool City Council election =

1960 UK local election

← 1959	12 May 1960	1961 →
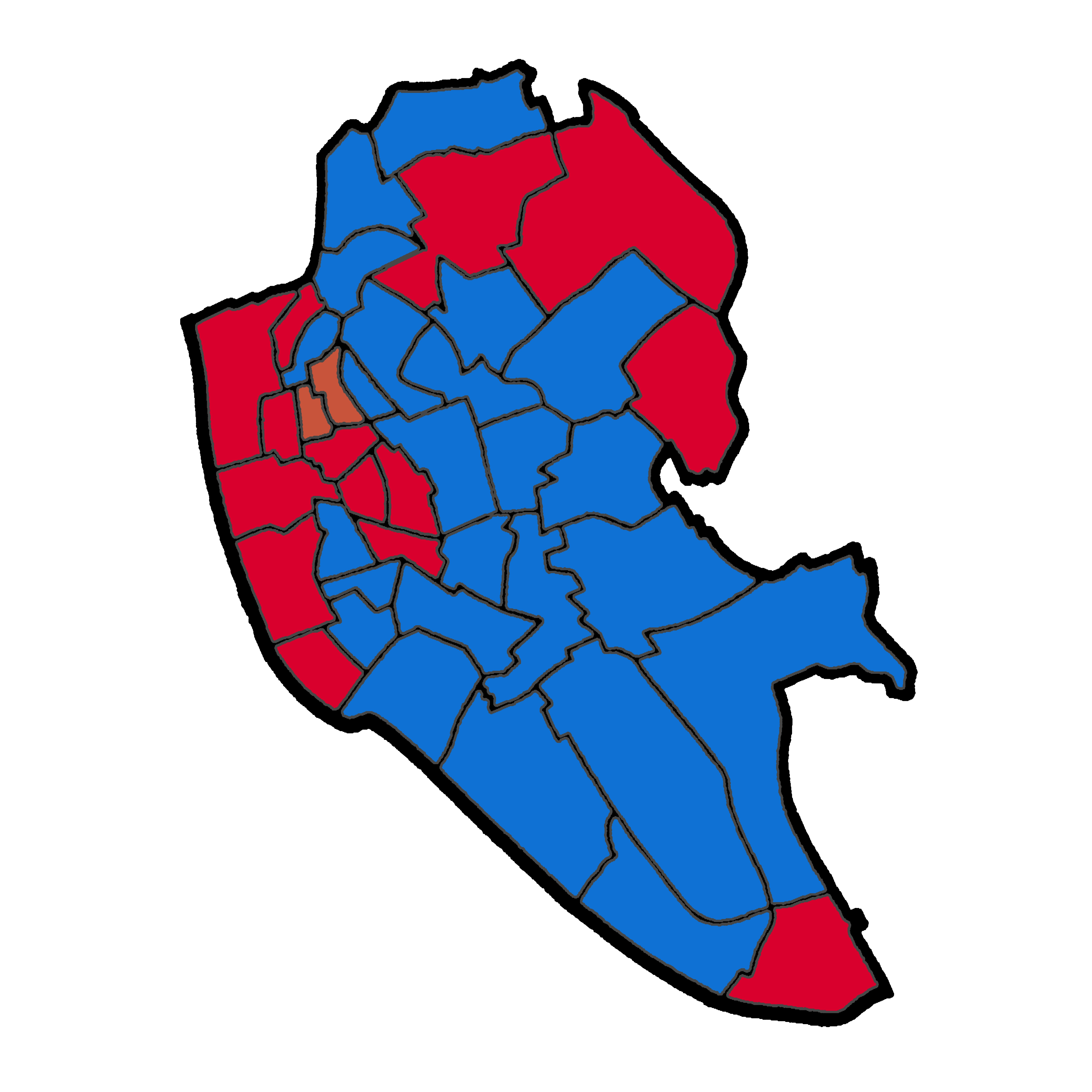
- Map of Liverpool showing wards won (first placed party)

Elections to Liverpool City Council were held on 12 May 1960.

After the election, the composition of the council was:

Party	Councillors	±	Aldermen	Total
Labour	61	-10	32	93
Conservative	56	+8	8	64
Protestant	3	+2	0	3

== Election result ==
Liverpool local election result 1960
Party	Seats	Gains	Losses	Net gain/loss	Seats %	Votes %	Votes	+/−
Conservative	24	9	2	+7	60%	56%	78,857	
Labour	14	2	11	-9	23%	38%	53,498	
Liberal	0	0	0	0	0%	3%	4,933	
Protestant	3	+2	0	+2	7.5%	2%	3,159	
Communist	0	9	0	0	0%			

== Ward results ==
* - Councillor seeking re-election

The Councillors seeking re-election at this election were elected in 1957 for a three-year term, therefore comparisons are made with the 1957 election results.

=== Abercromby ===
Abercromby
Party	Candidate	Votes	%	±%
Conservative	R. W. Rollins	1,089	49%	+16%
Labour	A. Williams	945	42%	−10%
Union Movement	H. Taylor	105	5%	
Communist	A. M^{c}Clelland	85	4%	0%
Majority		144		
Registered electors		10,592		
Turnout		2,224	21%	−10%
Conservative gain from Labour		Swing		

=== Aigburth ===
Aigburth
Party	Candidate	Votes	%	±%
Conservative	J. M. Entwistle	4,163	93%	+21%
Labour	F. J. McConville	328	7%	+1%
Majority		3,835		
Registered electors		13,984		
Turnout		4,491	32%	−9%
Conservative hold		Swing		

=== Allerton ===
Allerton
Party	Candidate	Votes	%	±%
Conservative	J. McMillan	2,698	87%	+7%
Labour	J. Taylor-Venables	404	13%	−7%
Majority		2,294		
Registered electors		10,304		
Turnout		3.102	30%	−5%
Conservative hold		Swing		

=== Anfield ===
Anfield
Party	Candidate	Votes	%	±%
Conservative	C. G. S. Gordon	3,287	70%	+12%
Labour	S. W. Jones	1,396	30%	−12%
Majority		1,891		
Registered electors		14,324		
Turnout		4,638	33%	−7%
Conservative hold		Swing		

=== Arundel ===
Arundel
Party	Candidate	Votes	%	±%
Conservative	P. W. Rathbone	2,535	64%	−7%
Labour	G. C. Carr	880	22%	−18%
Liberal	Mrs. B. A. Hands	438	11%	+11%
Communist	J. Kay	108	3%	0%
Majority		1,655		
Registered electors		12,454		
Turnout		3,961	32%	−4%
Conservative hold		Swing		

=== Breckfield ===
Breckfield
Party	Candidate	Votes	%	±%
Conservative	W. A. Lowe	1,991	61%	+20%
Labour	J. McKenna	1,297	39%	−20%
Majority		694		
Registered electors		11,244		
Turnout		3,288	29%	−10%
Conservative gain from Labour		Swing		

=== Broadgreen ===
Broadgreen
Party	Candidate	Votes	%	±%
Conservative	J. Keenan	2,534	76%	+11%
Labour	J. H. Summerville	819	24%	−11%
Majority		1,715		
Registered electors		11,745		
Turnout		3,353	29%	−6%
Conservative hold		Swing		

=== Central ===
Central
Party	Candidate	Votes	%	±%
Labour	W. McKeown *	1,347	51%	−10%
Conservative	A. McKie Reid	1,277	49%	+12%
Majority		70		
Registered electors		8,928		
Turnout		2,624	29%	−4%
Labour hold		Swing		

=== Childwall ===
Childwall
Party	Candidate	Votes	%	±%
Conservative	H. W. Hughes *	3,360	74%	+2%
Liberal	W. Russell Dyson	901	20%	+3%
Labour	J. Furlong	309	7%	−3%
Majority		2,459		
Registered electors		14,339		
Turnout		4,570	32%	−7%
Conservative hold		Swing		

=== Church ===
Church
Party	Candidate	Votes	%	±%
Conservative	H. M. Steward *	3,218	60%	−15%
Liberal	Cyril Carr	1,849	34%	+22%
Labour	J. F. Cloherty	336	6%	−4%
Majority		1,369		
Registered electors		13,772		
Turnout		5,403	39%	−2%
Conservative hold		Swing		

=== Clubmoor ===
Clubmoor
Party	Candidate	Votes	%	±%
Conservative	F. H. Wilson *	2,639	64%	+16%
Labour	Mrs. C. A. George	1,488	36%	−9%
Majority		1,151		
Registered electors		11,651		
Turnout		4,127	35%	−13%
Labour hold		Swing		

=== County ===
County
Party	Candidate	Votes	%	±%
Conservative	A. H. Maynard	3,208	55%	−8%
Labour	H. Dailey *	2,659	45%	−8%
Majority		549		
Registered electors		14,003		
Turnout		5,867	42%	−6%
Conservative gain from Labour		Swing		

=== Croxteth ===
Croxteth
Party	Candidate	Votes	%	±%
Conservative	J. E. Thompson *	3,440	77%	+8%
Labour	D. Pierce	602	14%	−8%
Majority		2,838		
Registered electors		11,645		
Turnout		4,443	38%	−10%
Conservative hold		Swing		

=== Dingle ===
Dingle
Party	Candidate	Votes	%	±%
Labour	D. Cumella *	2,132	51%	−8%
Conservative	C. N. Peplow	1,572	37%	0%
Liberal	J. F. Ross	469	12%	+12%
Majority		560		
Registered electors		13,077		
Turnout		4,200	32%	−7%
Labour hold		Swing		

=== Dovecot ===
Dovecot
Party	Candidate	Votes	%	±%
Labour	W. I. Davies *	1,960	51%	
Conservative	E. Johnson	1,857	49%	
Majority		103		
Registered electors		14,706		
Turnout		3,807	26%	
Labour gain from Conservative		Swing		

=== Everton ===
Everton
Party	Candidate	Votes	%	±%
Labour	S. F. Jacobs	1,290	63%	−18%
Conservative	E. Shaw	747	37%	+37%
Majority		543		
Registered electors		11,370		
Turnout		2,037	18%	−2%
Labour hold		Swing		

=== Fairfield ===
Fairfield
Party	Candidate	Votes	%	±%
Conservative	W. Thomas *	2,121	72%	+13%
Labour	R. Buckle	819	28%	−13%
Majority		1,302		
Registered electors		14,237		
Turnout		2,940	21%	−9%
Conservative hold		Swing		

=== Fazakerley ===
Fazakerley
Party	Candidate	Votes	%	±%
Conservative	B. Rattray *	2,799	64%	+13%
Labour	Pat Wall	1,566	36%	−13%
Majority		1,233		
Registered electors		11,819		
Turnout		4,365	37%	−13%
Conservative hold		Swing		

=== Gillmoss ===
Gillmoss
Party	Candidate	Votes	%	±%
Labour	Eddie Loyden	2,469	61%	−9%
Conservative	G. K. McKelvie	1,559	39%	+9%
Majority		910		
Registered electors		16,278		
Turnout		4,028	25%	−8%
Labour hold		Swing		

=== Granby ===
Granby
Party	Candidate	Votes	%	±%
Conservative	A. Lloyd	1,565	51%	+10%
Labour	J. Guinan *	1,489	49%	−10%
Majority		76		
Registered electors		11,841		
Turnout		3,054	26%	−6%
Conservative gain from Labour		Swing		

=== Kensington ===
Kensington
Party	Candidate	Votes	%	±%
Labour	T. K. Williams *	1,886	50%	−11%
Conservative	A. L. Audley	1,875	50%	+11%
Majority		11		
Registered electors		12,531		
Turnout		3,761	30%	−6%
Labour hold		Swing		

=== Low Hill ===
Low Hill
Party	Candidate	Votes	%	±%
Labour	G. M. Scott *	1,358	54%	−7%
Conservative	E. Crierie	1,171	46%	+7%
Majority		187		
Registered electors		9,816		
Turnout		2,529	26%	−3%
Labour hold		Swing		

=== Melrose ===
Melrose
Party	Candidate	Votes	%	±%
Labour	C. H. Browne *	1,292	56%	−14%
Conservative	S. D. Lunt	746	32%	+2%
Liberal	B. F. Bannon	277	12%	+12%
Majority		546		
Registered electors		9,699		
Turnout		2,315	24%	−7%
Labour hold		Swing		

=== Netherfield ===
Netherfield
Party	Candidate	Votes	%	±%
Protestant	F. Crook	1,322	56%	+56%
Labour	T. Robinson *	1,057	44%	−13%
Majority		265		
Registered electors		8,932		
Turnout		2,379	27%	+1%
Protestant gain from Labour		Swing		

=== Old Swan ===
Old Swan
Party	Candidate	Votes	%	±%
Conservative	R. H. Morris	2,707	64%	+16%
Labour	Mrs. M. Wills	1,347	32%	−19%
Communist	J. Edgar	143	3%	+2%
Majority		1,360		
Registered electors		15,367		
Turnout		4,197	27%	−13%
Conservative gain from Labour		Swing		

=== Picton ===
Picton
Party	Candidate	Votes	%	±%
Conservative	G. F. T. Smith	2,611	56%	+17%
Labour	A. G. Roberts *	2,059	44%	−7%
Majority		552		
Registered electors		14,299		
Turnout		4,670	33%	−7%
Conservative gain from Labour		Swing		

=== Pirrie ===
Pirrie
Party	Candidate	Votes	%	±%
Labour	Eric Heffer	3,001	52%	−9%
Conservative	J. P. Bailey	2,841	48%	+9%
Majority		180		
Registered electors		16,690		
Turnout		5,822	35%	−6%
Labour hold		Swing		

=== Prince's Park ===
Prince's Park
Party	Candidate	Votes	%	±%
Conservative	G. Clarke	1,807	52%	+7%
Labour	T. Roberts *	1,694	48%	−7%
Majority		113		
Registered electors		13,449		
Turnout		3,501	26%	−8%
Conservative gain from Labour		Swing		

=== Sandhills ===
Sandhills
Party	Candidate	Votes	%	±%
Labour	J. Scully *	1,592	90%	−3%
Conservative	A. C. Bailey	173	10%	+3%
Majority		1,419	20%	−4%
Registered electors		9,041		
Turnout		1,765	20%	−4%
Labour hold		Swing		

=== St. Domingo ===
St. Domingo
Party	Candidate	Votes	%	±%
Protestant	H. D. Longbottom	1,837	54%	+54%
Labour	W. R. Maylor *	1,581	46%	−13%
Majority		256		
Registered electors		11,931		
Turnout		3,418	29%	−2%
Protestant gain from Labour		Swing		

=== St. James ===
St. James
Party	Candidate	Votes	%	±%
Labour	T. McManus *	1,556	74%	−7%
Conservative	B. Ingham	534	26%	+7%
Majority		1,022		
Registered electors		10,772		
Turnout		2,090	19%	−8%
Labour hold		Swing		

=== St. Mary's ===
St. Mary's
Party	Candidate	Votes	%	±%
Conservative	J. A. Nolan	1,880	53%	+9%
Labour	Mrs. P. Henley *	1,652	47%	−9%
Majority		228		
Registered electors		11,454		
Turnout		3,532	31%	−2%
Conservative gain from Labour		Swing		

=== St. Michael's ===
St. Michael's
Party	Candidate	Votes	%	±%
Conservative	W. Browne *	2,323	67%	−4%
Liberal	D. W. Haggart	571	17%	+17%
Labour	J. F. Stevens	436	13%	−12%
Anti-Debt League	A. P. Cooney	126	4%	0%
Majority		1,752		
Registered electors		10,063		
Turnout		3,456	34%	−4%
Conservative hold		Swing		

=== Smithdown ===
Smithdown
Party	Candidate	Votes	%	±%
Labour	W. Gibbs *	1,492	68%	−3%
Conservative	H. Hawkins	698	32%	+3%
Majority		794		
Registered electors		12,261		
Turnout		2,190	18%	−9%
Labour hold		Swing		

=== Speke ===
Speke
Party	Candidate	Votes	%	±%
Labour	W. H. Sefton *	1,657	56%	
Conservative	G. McDonald	1,294	44%	
Majority		363		
Registered electors		14,086		
Turnout		14,086	21%	
Labour gain from Conservative		Swing		

=== Tuebrook ===
Tuebrook
Party	Candidate	Votes	%	±%
Conservative	E. F. Pine *	2,683	65%	+10%
Labour	H. Roberts	1,465	35%	−10%
Majority		1,218		
Registered electors		12,928		
Turnout		4,148	32%	−12%
Conservative hold		Swing		

=== Vauxhall ===
Vauxhall
Party	Candidate	Votes	%	±%
Labour	W. Dean-Jones *	640	77%	−7%
Communist	T. E. Cassin	190	23%	+20%
Majority		640		
Registered electors		9,424		
Turnout		830	9%	−8%
Labour hold		Swing		

=== Warbreck ===
Warbreck
Party	Candidate	Votes	%	±%
Conservative	R. J. McLaughlin	3,075	73%	+12%
Labour	K. E. Dickinson	1,148	27%	−12%
Majority		1,927		
Registered electors		13,244		
Turnout		4,223	32%	−13%
Conservative hold		Swing		

=== Westminster ===
Westminster
Party	Candidate	Votes	%	±%
Conservative	J. Gillin	1,355	53%	+13%
Labour	R. J. Alcock *	1,193	47%	−13%
Majority		162		
Registered electors		7,770		
Turnout		2,548	33%	−5%
Conservative gain from Labour		Swing		

=== Woolton ===
Woolton
Party	Candidate	Votes	%	±%
Conservative	J. McAllister *	3,445	80%	+7%
Labour	W. Lungley	867	20%	−7%
Majority		2,578		
Registered electors		15,824		
Turnout		4,312	27%	−11%
Conservative hold		Swing		
