= 1962 Liverpool City Council election =

1962 UK local election

← 1961	10 May 1962	1963 →

41 (including a by-election for St. Domingo ward) of 120 Councillors' seats to Liverpool City Council 81 of 120 Councillors and 40 Aldermen seats needed for a majority
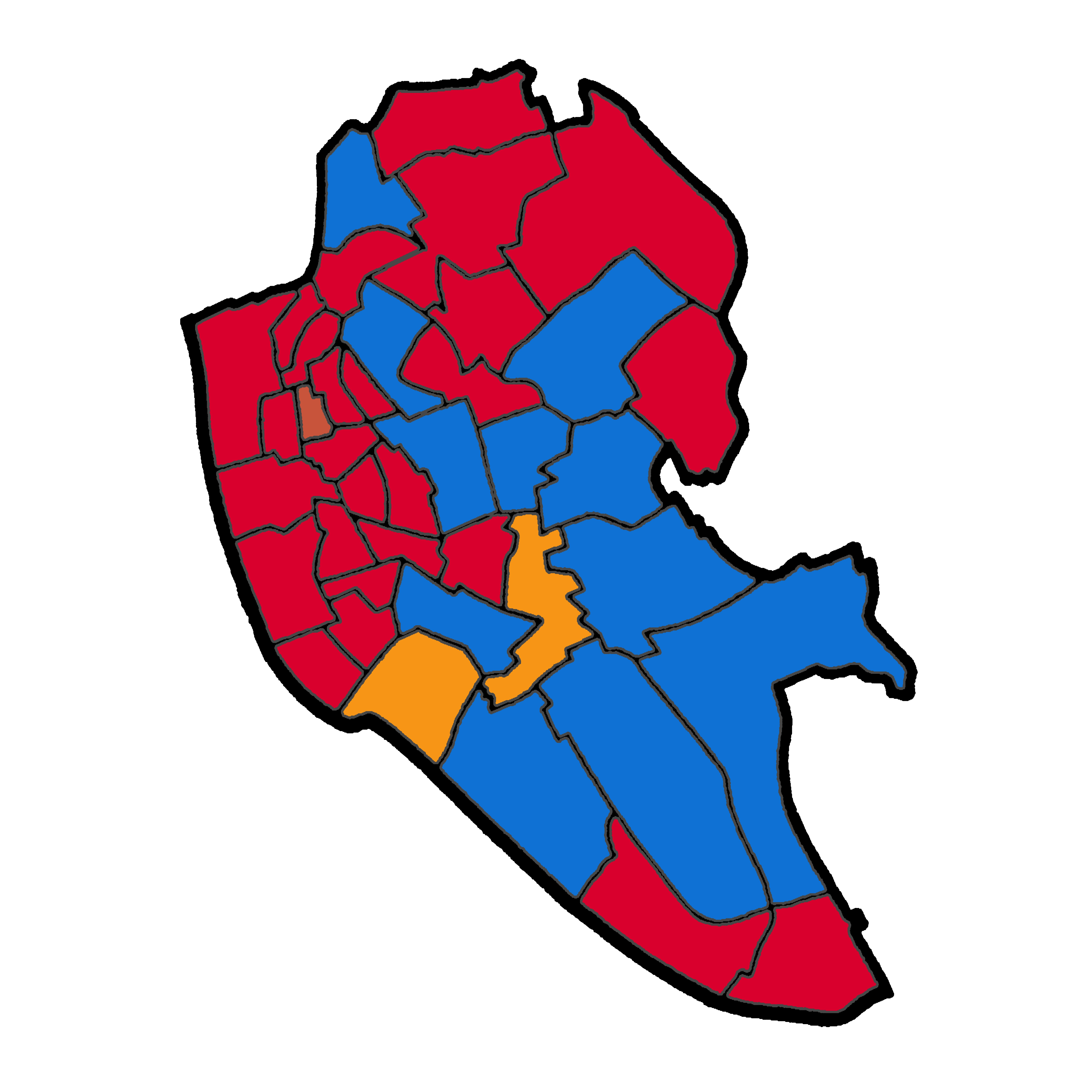
- Map of Liverpool showing wards won (first placed party)

Elections to Liverpool City Council were held on 10 May 1962.

Aldermanic elections took place at the City Council meeting on 24 May 1962, and as some councillors were elected as Aldermen there were by-elections for the vacated seats on Thursday 29 June 1962.

After the election, the composition of the council was:

Party	Councillors	±	Aldermen	Total
Conservative	55	-8	26	81
Labour	59	+8	14	73
Protestant	4	0	0	4
Liberal	2	+2	0	2

== Election result ==
Liverpool local election result 1962
Party	Seats	Gains	Losses	Net gain/loss	Seats %	Votes %	Votes	+/−
Conservative	10	0	6	-6	27%	41%	66,656	
Labour	23	6	0	+6	66%	48%	79,288	
Liberal	2	1	0	+1	5%	8%	12,662	
Protestant	1	0	1	-1	2.5%	3.1%	5,084	
Communist	0	0	0	0	0%	0.44%	722	
Anti-Debt	0	0	0	0	0%	0.25%	402	
British Union Movement	0	0	0	0	0%	0.22%	365	

== Ward results ==
* - Councillor seeking re-election

^{(PARTY)} - Party of former Councillor

The Councillors seeking re-election at this election were elected in 1959 for a three-year term, therefore comparisons are made with the 1959 election results.

=== Abercromby ===
Abercromby
Party	Candidate	Votes	%	±%
Labour	Harry Livermore ^{(PARTY)}	1,707	66%	+11%
Conservative	L. Huglin	742	29%	−11%
Communist	A. M^{c}Clelland	135	5%	0%
Majority		965		
Registered electors		9.810		
Turnout		2,584	26%	+1%
Labour hold		Swing		

=== Aigburth ===
Aigburth
Party	Candidate	Votes	%	±%
Conservative	W. N. Venmore ^{(PARTY)}	3,821	87%	+10%
Labour	S. J. Cook	550	13%	+8%
Majority		3,271		
Registered electors		13,792		
Turnout		4,371	32%	−11%
Conservative hold		Swing		

=== Allerton ===
Allerton
Party	Candidate	Votes	%	±%
Conservative	W. S. D. Weaver ^{(PARTY)}	2,486	73%	−8%
Labour	Mrs. M. B. Simey	912	27%	+8%
Majority		1,574		
Registered electors		10,186		
Turnout		3,398	33%	−3%
Conservative hold		Swing		

=== Anfield ===
Anfield
Party	Candidate	Votes	%	±%
Conservative	R. F. Craine *	3,026	59%	−9%
Labour	S. W. Jones	2,097	41%	+9%
Majority		929		
Registered electors		14,090		
Turnout		5,123	36%	−4%
Conservative hold		Swing		

=== Arundel ===
Arundel
Party	Candidate	Votes	%	±%
Conservative	C. Price *	2,143	41%	−24%
Labour	C. Taylor	1,769	34%	+3%
Liberal	I. Gottlieb	1,209	23%	+23%
Communist	J. Kay	83	4%	0%
Majority		374		
Registered electors		12,494		
Turnout		5,204	42%	+6%
Conservative hold		Swing		

=== Breckfield ===
Breckfield
Party	Candidate	Votes	%	±%
Labour	J. E. Burns	2,021	53%	+6%
Conservative	S. Airey *	1,783	47%	−6%
Majority		238		
Registered electors		11,118		
Turnout		3,804	34%	−3%
Labour gain from Conservative		Swing		

=== Broadgreen ===
Broadgreen
Party	Candidate	Votes	%	±%
Conservative	F. J. Bullen ^{(PARTY)}	1,796	45%	−32%
Liberal	W. Galbraith	1,133	27%	+27%
Labour	J. M. Burke	1,027	26%	+12%
Majority		663		
Registered electors		11,511		
Turnout		3,956	34%	−6%
Conservative hold		Swing		

=== Central ===
Central
Party	Candidate	Votes	%	±%
Labour	J. Cullen *	1,827	66%	
Conservative	A. E. Rossington	933	34%	
Majority		894		
Registered electors		8,629		
Turnout		2,760	32%	
Labour hold		Swing		

=== Childwall ===
Childwall
Party	Candidate	Votes	%	±%
Conservative	W. J. Sergent *	3,171	51%	−15%
Liberal	A. J. Markey	2,314	37%	+11%
Labour	T. Bailey	687	11%	+4%
Majority		857		
Registered electors		16,674		
Turnout		6,172	37%	−5%
Conservative hold		Swing		

=== Church ===
Church
Party	Candidate	Votes	%	±%
Liberal	Cyril E. Carr	3,540	53%	+23%
Conservative	Mrs. T. L. Norton	2,732	41%	−19%
Labour	Mrs. M. E. Cullen	384	6%	−4%
Majority		808		
Registered electors		13,565		
Turnout		6,656	49%	+7%
Liberal hold		Swing		

=== Clubmoor ===
Clubmoor
Party	Candidate	Votes	%	±%
Labour	F. Grue	2,326	47%	+2%
Conservative	L. J. Carr *	1,974	40%	−15%
Liberal	G. H. Bilson	651	13%	+13%
Majority		352		
Registered electors		11,310		
Turnout		4,951	44%	−1%
Labour gain from Conservative		Swing		

=== County ===
County
Party	Candidate	Votes	%	±%
Labour	C. P. Wall	3,057	54%	+4%
Conservative	B. Ingham ^{(PARTY)}	2,625	46%	−4%
Majority		432		
Registered electors		13,588		
Turnout		5,682	42%	−3%
Labour gain from Conservative		Swing		

=== Croxteth ===
Croxteth
Party	Candidate	Votes	%	±%
Conservative	C. Dickinson *	3,065	71%	−4%
Labour	G. C. Carr	1,256	29%	+11%
Majority		1,809		
Registered electors		11,692		
Turnout		4,321	37%	−8%
Conservative hold		Swing		

=== Dingle ===
Dingle
Party	Candidate	Votes	%	±%
Labour	Richard Crawshaw *	2,434	60%	−2%
Conservative	Mrs. F. Devine	1,197	30%	−8%
Liberal	J. Reilly	235	6%	+6%
Anti-debt	J. R. Gradwell	176	4%	+4%
Majority		1,237		
Registered electors		12,434		
Turnout		4,042	33%	−3%
Labour hold		Swing		

=== Dovecot ===
Dovecot
Party	Candidate	Votes	%	±%
Labour	W. P. Johnson *	2,908	54%	−3%
Conservative	A. M. Wilson	1,506	28%	−15%
Liberal	John Bowen	928	17%	+17%
Anti-Debt	F. G. Connor	71	1%	+1%
Majority		1,402		
Registered electors		25,329		
Turnout		5,413	38%	+6%
Labour hold		Swing		

=== Everton ===
Everton
Party	Candidate	Votes	%	±%
Labour	W. Smyth *	1,811	72%	−2%
Conservative	E. Shaw	562	22%	
Communist	J. Edgar	80	3%	+3%
British Union Movement	T. G. Kenny	67	3%	+3%
Majority		1,239		
Registered electors		10,198		
Turnout		2,520	25%	+2%
Labour hold		Swing		

=== Fairfield ===
Fairfield
Party	Candidate	Votes	%	±%
Conservative	J. P. Moyses ^{(PARTY)}	1,908	51%	−8%
Labour	J. Guinan	1,824	49%	+8%
Majority		84		
Registered electors		13,695		
Turnout		3,732	27%	−6%
Conservative hold		Swing		

=== Fazakerley ===
Fazakerley
Party	Candidate	Votes	%	±%
Labour	J. Morgan	2,545	51%	+7%
Conservative	A. L. Ritchie	2,421	49%	−7%
Majority		124		
Registered electors		11,448		
Turnout		4,966	43%	−5%
Labour gain from Conservative		Swing		

=== Gillmoss ===
Gillmoss
Party	Candidate	Votes	%	±%
Labour	G. E. Delooze *	3,883	73%	+7%
Conservative	J. Swainbank	1,191	22%	−12%
Communist	D. Wilkinson	247	5%	+5%
Majority		2,692		
Registered electors		16,007		
Turnout		5,321	33%	+3%
Labour hold		Swing		

=== Granby ===
Granby
Party	Candidate	Votes	%	±%
Labour	J. D. Hamilton *	2,075	58%	+3%
Conservative	S. A. Hughes	1,493	42%	−3%
Majority		582		
Registered electors		10,954		
Turnout		3,568	33%	+3%
Labour hold		Swing		

=== Kensington ===
Kensington
Party	Candidate	Votes	%	±%
Labour	L. Holden ^{(PARTY)}	2,189	64%	+6%
Conservative	A. B. Moore	1,120	33%	−9%
Anti-Debt	A. P. Cooney	118	3%	+3%
Majority		1,069		
Registered electors		12,011		
Turnout		3,427	29%	−6%
Labour hold		Swing		

=== Low Hill ===
Low Hill
Party	Candidate	Votes	%	±%
Labour	W. R. Snell *	1,676	68%	+6%
Conservative	T. Hillcock	698	28%	−10%
British Union Movement	M. J. Ward	83	3%	+3%
Majority		978		
Registered electors		9,493		
Turnout		2,457	26%	−1%
Labour hold		Swing		

=== Melrose ===
Melrose
Party	Candidate	Votes	%	±%
Labour	G. Ackers ^{(PARTY)}	1,791	70%	+6%
Conservative	S. D. Lunt	762	30%	−6%
Majority		1,029		
Registered electors		9,394		
Turnout		3.107	27%	−4%
Labour hold		Swing		

=== Netherfield ===
Netherfield
Party	Candidate	Votes	%	±%
Protestant	A Harris ^{(PARTY)}	1,447	51%	▼3%
Labour	L. Caplan	1,413	49%	▲19%
Majority		34		
Registered electors		8,306		
Turnout		2,860	34%	▼3%
Protestant hold		Swing		

=== Old Swan ===
Old Swan
Party	Candidate	Votes	%	±%
Conservative	A. McKie Reid ^{(PARTY)}	2,364	54%	▼3%
Labour	G. R. Sullivan	2,038	46%	▲3%
Majority		326		
Registered electors		14.917		
Turnout		4,402	30%	▼9%
Conservative hold		Swing		

=== Picton ===
Picton
Party	Candidate	Votes	%	±%
Labour	H. Evans *	2,975	57%	+5%
Conservative	E. W. Holland	2,282	43%	−5%
Majority		693		
Registered electors		13,994		
Turnout		5,257	38%	▼1%
Labour hold		Swing		

=== Pirrie ===
Pirrie
Party	Candidate	Votes	%	±%
Labour	M. Black *	4,208	68%	▲9%
Conservative	G. Parsons	1,988	32%	▼7%
Majority		2,220		
Registered electors		16,590		
Turnout		6,196	37%	▼2%
Labour hold		Swing		

=== Prince's Park ===
Prince's Park
Party	Candidate	Votes	%	±%
Labour	J. Sidwell *	2,304	54%	▼1%
Conservative	W. Savage	1,317	31%	▼14%
Liberal	A. Garland	629	15%	▲15%
Majority		987		
Registered electors		13,264		
Turnout		4,250	32%	▲2%
Labour hold		Swing		

=== Sandhills ===
Sandhills
Party	Candidate	Votes	%	±%
Labour	V. Burke *	1,878	89%	▲1%
Conservative	A. C. Bailey	146	7%	▼5%
Communist	B. Campbell	95	4%	▼4%
Majority		1,732		
Registered electors		8,440		
Turnout		2,119	25%	▼3%
Labour hold		Swing		

=== St. Domingo ===
St. Domingo 2 seats
Party	Candidate	Votes	%	±%
Labour	J. Gardner ^{(PARTY)}	2,369	56%	▲4%
Labour	F. Keating	2,237	53%	▲1%
Protestant	W. H. Blower ^{(PARTY)}	1,877	44%	▼4%
Protestant	G. H. Mason	1,760	41%	▼7%
Majority		492		
Registered electors		11,763		
Turnout		4,246	36%	▼1%
Labour hold		Swing		
Labour gain from Protestant		Swing		

=== St. James ===
St. James
Party	Candidate	Votes	%	±%
Labour	O. J. Doyle *	2,151	80%	▲2%
Conservative	K. W. Davies	536	20%	▲2%
Majority		1,615		
Registered electors		10,738		
Turnout		2,687	25%	0%
Labour hold		Swing		

=== St. Mary's ===
St. Mary's
Party	Candidate	Votes	%	±%
Labour	F. Walker ^{(PARTY)}	2,501	58%	▲4%
Conservative	J. Tushingham	1,830	42%	▼1%
Majority		671		
Registered electors		11,167		
Turnout		4,331	39%	0%
Labour hold		Swing		

=== St. Michael's ===
St. Michael's
Party	Candidate	Votes	%	±%
Liberal	Joseph R. Wilmington	2,023	46%	▲46
Conservative	S. T. Moss ^{(PARTY)}	1,859	42	▼33
Labour	S. G. Thorne	544	12	▼8
Majority		164		
Registered electors		9,895		
Turnout		4,426	45	▲8
Liberal gain from Conservative		Swing		

=== Smithdown ===
Smithdown
Party	Candidate	Votes	%	±%
Labour	Mrs. E. E. Wright *	1,909	65%	▼2%
Conservative	T. Strange	797	27%	▼6%
British Union Movement	H. Traynor	215	7%	▲7%
Majority		1,112		
Registered electors		12,042		
Turnout		2,921	24%	0%
Labour hold		Swing		

=== Speke ===
Speke
Party	Candidate	Votes	%	±%
Labour	T. Higgins *	2,990	77%	▲19%
Conservative	B. F. Evans	885	23%	▼15%
Majority		2,105		
Registered electors		14,135		
Turnout		3,875	27%	▼1%
Labour hold		Swing		

=== Tuebrook ===
Tuebrook
Party	Candidate	Votes	%	±%
Labour	B. Shaw	2,576	52%	▲9%
Conservative	J. F. Bradley *	2,348	48%	
Majority		228	4%	
Registered electors		12,641		
Turnout		4,924	39%	▼2%
Labour gain from Conservative		Swing		

=== Vauxhall ===
Vauxhall
Party	Candidate	Votes	%	±%
Labour	A. Dunford *	1,661	95%	0%
Communist	T. E. Cassin	82	5%	0%
Majority		1,661		
Registered electors		9,560		
Turnout		1,743	18%	▲1%
Labour hold		Swing		

=== Warbreck ===
Warbreck
Party	Candidate	Votes	%	±%
Conservative	D. A. Ritchie ^{(PARTY)}	2,672	60%	▼5%
Labour	J. V. Grue	1,788	40%	▲5%
Majority		884		
Registered electors		12,868		
Turnout		4,460	35%	▼7%
Labour hold		Swing		

=== Westminster ===
Westminster
Party	Candidate	Votes	%	±%
Labour	H. Carr ^{(PARTY)}	1,575	56%	▲1%
Conservative	W. Gilbody	1,182	42%	▼3%
Anti-Debt	T. J. Anderson	37	1%	▲1%
Majority		393	14%	▲4%
Registered electors		7,626		
Turnout		2,794	37%	▼2%
Labour hold		Swing		

=== Woolton ===
Woolton
Party	Candidate	Votes	%	±%
Conservative	L. B. Williams ^{(PARTY)}	3,294	66%	▼9%
Labour	R. Buckle	1,718	34%	▲9%
Majority		1,576		
Registered electors		17,108		
Turnout		5,012	29%	▼8%
Conservative hold		Swing		
