= 1958 Liverpool City Council election =

1958 UK local election

← 1957	8 May 1958	1959 →
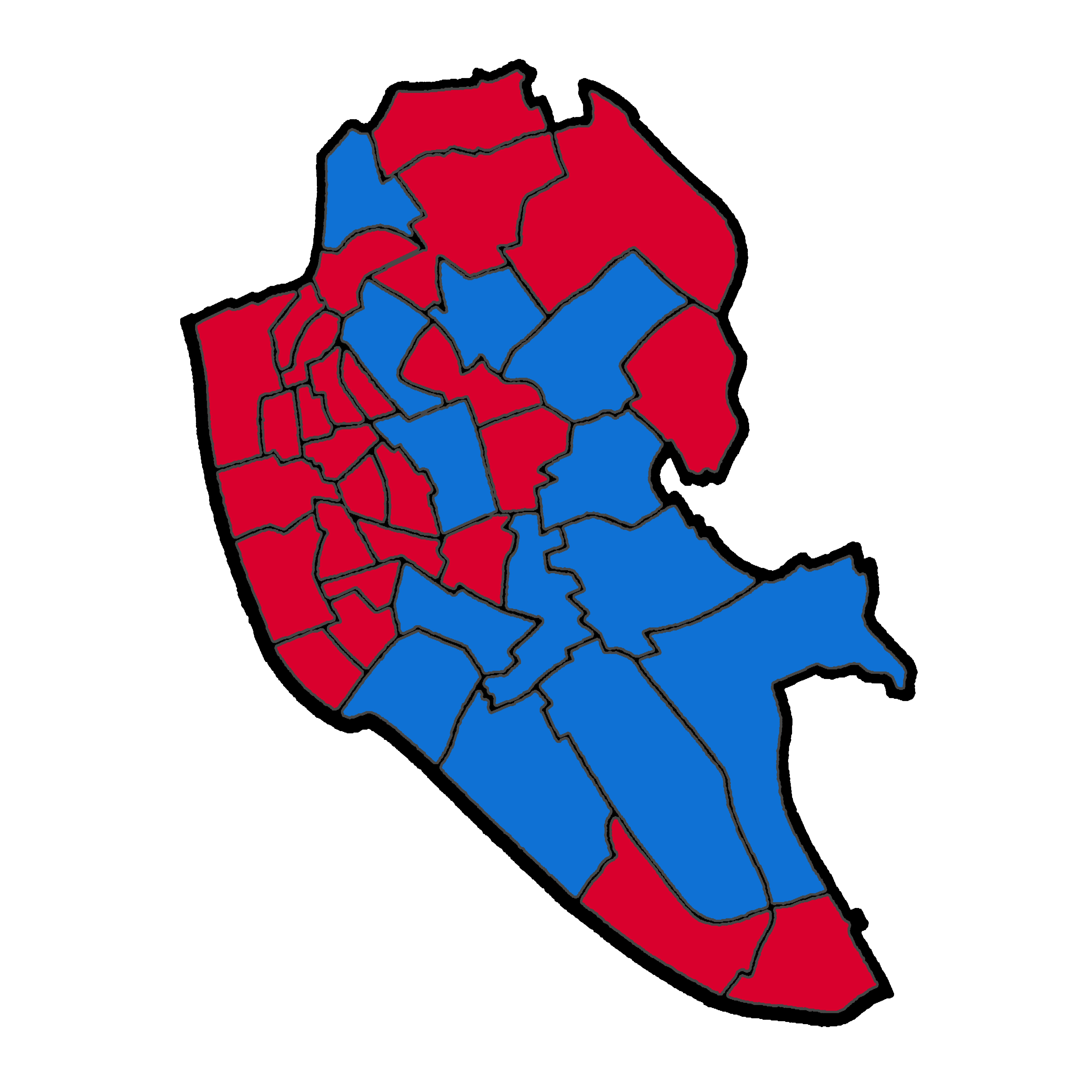
- Map of Liverpool showing wards won (first placed party)

Elections to Liverpool City Council were held on 8 May 1958.

After the election, the composition of the council was:

Party	Councillors	±	Aldermen
Labour	75	+10	30
Conservative	44	-7	9
Protestant	2	-1	1
Liberal	0	0	0

== Election result ==
Liverpool local election result 1958
Party	Seats	Gains	Losses	Net gain/loss	Seats %	Votes %	Votes	+/−
Labour	27	7	0	+7		51%	87,421	
Conservative	13	0	6	-6		46%	77,492	
Liberal	0	0	0	0	0	2.5%	4,188	
Protestant	0	0	1	-1				
Communist	0	0	0	0	0%	0.33%	560	

== Ward results ==
* - Councillor seeking re-election

^{(PARTY)} - Party of former Councillor

The Councillors seeking re-election at this election were elected in 1955 for a three-year term, therefore comparisons are made with the 1955 election results.

=== Abercromby ===
Abercromby
Party	Candidate	Votes	%	±%
Labour	P. Maguire *	1,795	52%	
Conservative	A. McVeigh	1,131	33%	
Independent	L. Murphy	298	9%	
Communist	A. M^{c}Clelland	145	4%	+1%
Independent Labour	J. C. Nurse	52	2%	
Majority		664		
Registered electors		11,108		
Turnout		3,421	31%	
Labour hold		Swing		

=== Aigburth ===
Aigburth
Party	Candidate	Votes	%	±%
Conservative	W. A. Kinear *	4,156	72	
Liberal	W. Russell Dyson	1,208	21	
Labour	J. H. Sommerville	369	6	
Majority		2,948		
Registered electors		13,969		
Turnout		5,733	41	
Conservative hold		Swing		

=== Allerton ===
Allerton
Party	Candidate	Votes	%	±%
Conservative	S. Minion *	2,883	80%	
Labour	Mrs. E. E. Wright	700	20%	
Majority		2,183		
Registered electors		10,234		
Turnout		3,583	35%	
Conservative hold		Swing		

=== Anfield ===
Anfield
Party	Candidate	Votes	%	±%
Conservative	J. A. Porter *	3,411	58%	
Labour	J. T. Venables	2,473	42%	
Majority		938		
Registered electors		14,634		
Turnout		5,884	40%	
Conservative hold		Swing		

=== Arundel ===
Arundel
Party	Candidate	Votes	%	±%
Conservative	H. Lees *	2,562	57%	
Labour	J. E. McPherson	1,782	40%	
Communist	J. Kay	155	3%	
Majority		780		
Registered electors		12,615		
Turnout		4,499	36%	
Conservative hold		Swing		

=== Breckfield ===
Breckfield
Party	Candidate	Votes	%	±%
Labour	J. Mottram	2,680	59%	
Conservative	H. Pagakis ^{(PARTY)}	1,855	41%	
Majority		825		
Registered electors		11,675		
Turnout		4,535	39%	
Labour gain from Conservative		Swing		

=== Broadgreen ===
Broadgreen
Party	Candidate	Votes	%	±%
Conservative	L. T. Rogers *	2,700	65%	
Labour	M. Black	1,486	35%	
Majority		1,214		
Registered electors		11,998		
Turnout		4,186	35%	
Conservative hold		Swing		

=== Central ===
Central
Party	Candidate	Votes	%	±%
Labour	Miss M. Schofield ^{(PARTY)}	1,732	59%	
Conservative	C. P. Bramble	1,195	41%	
Majority		537		
Registered electors		9,271		
Turnout		2,927	32%	
Labour hold		Swing		

=== Childwall ===
Childwall
Party	Candidate	Votes	%	±%
Conservative	A. Young *	3,362	59	
Liberal	Albert Globe	1,908	33	
Labour	W. M. Cooper	430	8	
Majority		1,454		
Registered electors		14,012		
Turnout		5,700	41	
Conservative hold		Swing		

=== Church ===
Church
Party	Candidate	Votes	%	±%
Conservative	J. F. Barnes ^{(PARTY)}	3,611	68%	
Liberal	Mrs, A. E. Shanks	1,072	20%	
Labour	G. E. Delooze	657	12%	
Majority		2,954		
Registered electors		14,001		
Turnout		5,340	38%	
Conservative hold		Swing		

=== Clubmoor ===
Clubmoor
Party	Candidate	Votes	%	±%
Conservative	N. A. Williams *	2,715	50%	
Labour	R. Buckle	2,674	50%	
Majority		41		
Registered electors		11,929		
Turnout		5,389	45%	
Conservative hold		Swing		

=== County ===
County
Party	Candidate	Votes	%	±%
Labour	B. Deane	3,859	59%	
Conservative	C. F. Allanson *	2,679	41%	
Majority		1,180		
Registered electors		14,560		
Turnout		6,538	45%	
Labour gain from Conservative		Swing		

=== Croxteth ===
Croxteth
Party	Candidate	Votes	%	±%
Conservative	T. H. Thompson *	3,725	72%	
Labour	J. M. Burke	1,458	28%	
Majority		2,267		
Registered electors		11,561		
Turnout		5,183	45%	
Conservative hold		Swing		

=== Dingle ===
Dingle
Party	Candidate	Votes	%	±%
Labour	R. Stodart ^{(PARTY)}	3,452	66%	
Conservative	J. F. I. Bamber	1,788	34%	
Majority		1,664		
Registered electors		13,723		
Turnout		5,240	38%	
Labour hold		Swing		

=== Dovecot ===
Dovecot
Party	Candidate	Votes	%	±%
Labour	T. H. Maloney *	2,772	68%	
Conservative	Mrs. E. I. McGinn	1,281	32%	
Majority		1,491		
Registered electors		14,809		
Turnout		4,053	27%	
Labour hold		Swing		

=== Everton ===
Everton
Party	Candidate	Votes	%	±%
Labour	Francis Burke ^{(PARTY)}	unopposed		
Registered electors		12,370		
Labour hold		Swing		

=== Fairfield ===
Fairfield
Party	Candidate	Votes	%	±%
Conservative	J. S. Ross *	2,419	50%	
Labour	V. Burke	2,379	50%	
Majority		40		
Registered electors		14,487		
Turnout		4,798	33%	
Conservative hold		Swing		

=== Fazakerley ===
Fazakerley - 2 seats
Party	Candidate	Votes	%	±%
Labour	F. Grue	3,400	52%	
Labour	H. Wallace	3,173	49%	
Conservative	R. J. McLoughlin	3,136	48%	
Conservative	R. Poole *	3,025	46%	
Majority		264		
Registered electors		12,279		
Turnout		6,536	53%	
Labour gain from Conservative		Swing		
Labour gain from Conservative		Swing		

=== Gillmoss ===
Gillmoss
Party	Candidate	Votes	%	±%
Labour	E. D. Roderick ^{(PARTY)}	4,004	72%	
Conservative	H. R. Butler	1,559	28%	
Majority		2,445		
Registered electors		16,413		
Turnout		5,563	34%	
Labour hold		Swing		

=== Granby ===
Granby
Party	Candidate	Votes	%	±%
Labour	W. T, Brodie *	2,278	64%	
Conservative	Mrs. R. Dean	1,301	36%	
Majority		977		
Registered electors		11,893		
Turnout		3,579	30%	
Labour hold		Swing		

=== Kensington ===
Kensington
Party	Candidate	Votes	%	±%
Labour	Mrs. E. Wormald *	3,022	67%	
Conservative	A. L. Audley	1,457	33%	
Majority		1,565		
Registered electors		13,018		
Turnout		4,479	34%	
Labour hold		Swing		

=== Low Hill ===
Low Hill
Party	Candidate	Votes	%	±%
Labour	Mrs. M. J. Powell *	2,321	70%	
Conservative	E. Crierie	990	27%	
Majority		1,331		
Registered electors		10,301		
Turnout		3,311	32%	
Labour hold		Swing		

=== Melrose ===
Melrose
Party	Candidate	Votes	%	±%
Labour	A. MacDonald *	2,168	73%	
Conservative	J. Smith	814	27%	
Majority		1,354		
Registered electors		10,090		
Turnout		2,982	30%	
Labour hold		Swing		

=== Netherfield ===
Netherfield
Party	Candidate	Votes	%	±%
Labour	R. Clitherow	1,364	54%	
Conservative	E. Shaw	1,168	46%	
Majority		196		
Registered electors		9,137		
Turnout		2,532	28%	
Labour gain from Protestant		Swing		

=== Old Swan ===
Old Swan
Party	Candidate	Votes	%	±%
Labour	J. A. Dunn ^{(PARTY)}	3,235	53%	
Conservative	R. J. Cleary	2,703	44%	
Communist	E. Cohen	191	3%	
Majority		532		
Registered electors		15,738		
Turnout		6,129	39%	
Labour hold		Swing		

=== Picton ===
Picton
Party	Candidate	Votes	%	±%
Labour	G. R. Sullivan	3,237	56%	
Conservative	J. E. Kendrick *	2,549	44%	
Majority		688		
Registered electors		14,584		
Turnout		5,786	40%	
Labour gain from Conservative		Swing		

=== Pirrie ===
Pirrie
Party	Candidate	Votes	%	±%
Labour	W. F. Smith ^{(PARTY)}	4,230	66%	
Conservative	Mrs. M. Berry	2,195	34%	
Majority		2,035		
Registered electors				
Turnout		6,425		
Labour hold		Swing	6	

=== Prince's Park ===
Prince's Park
Party	Candidate	Votes	%	±%
Labour	T. C. Greenwood *	2,796	64%	
Conservative	Mrs. M. Brown	1,596	36%	
Majority		1,200		
Registered electors		13,672		
Turnout		4,392	32%	
Labour hold		Swing		

=== Sandhills ===
Sandhills
Party	Candidate	Votes	%	±%
Labour	W. H. Aldritt ^{(PARTY)}	2,491	94%	
Conservative	A. E. Dailey	163	6%	
Majority		2,328		
Registered electors		9,417		
Turnout		2,654	28%	
Labour hold		Swing		

=== St. Domingo ===
St. Domingo
Party	Candidate	Votes	%	±%
Labour	James Gardner *	unopposed		
Registered electors				
Turnout				
Labour hold		Swing		

=== St. James ===
St. James
Party	Candidate	Votes	%	±%
Labour	Mrs. E. E. Gough *	2,147	82%	
Conservative	K. W. Davies	483	18%	
Majority		1,664		
Registered electors		10,998		
Turnout		2,630	24%	
Labour hold		Swing		

=== St. Mary's ===
St. Mary's
Party	Candidate	Votes	%	±%
Labour	S. E. Maddox *	2,671	62%	
Conservative	Miss O. Adair	1,630	38%	
Majority		1,041		
Registered electors				
Turnout		4,301		
Labour hold		Swing		

=== St. Michael's ===
St. Michael's
Party	Candidate	Votes	%	±%
Conservative	C. Cowlin *	2,525	67%	
Labour	F. D. Shemmonds	1,247	33%	
Majority		1,278		
Registered electors		10,103		
Turnout		3,772	37%	
Conservative hold		Swing		

=== Smithdown ===
Smithdown
Party	Candidate	Votes	%	±%
Labour	G, W. Clarke *	2,525	79%	
Conservative	E. Johnson	686	21%	
Majority		1,839		
Registered electors		13,018		
Turnout		3,211	25%	
Labour hold		Swing		

=== Speke ===
Speke
Party	Candidate	Votes	%	±%
Labour	B. Crookes *	2,591	74%	
Conservative	E. Smith	920	26%	
Majority		1,671		
Registered electors		13,996		
Turnout		3,511	25%	
Labour hold		Swing		

=== Tuebrook ===
Tuebrook
Party	Candidate	Votes	%	±%
Labour	B. Shaw	3,086	54%	
Conservative	J. Jordan ^{(PARTY)}	2,612	46%	
Majority		474		
Registered electors		13,217		
Turnout		5,698	43%	
Labour gain from Conservative		Swing		

=== Vauxhall ===
Vauxhall
Party	Candidate	Votes	%	±%
Labour	J. P. Shannon ^{(PARTY)}	1,917	97%	
Communist	R. Cuerdon	69	3%	
Majority		1,917		
Registered electors		9,673		
Turnout		1,986	21%	
Labour hold		Swing		

=== Warbreck ===
Warbreck
Party	Candidate	Votes	%	±%
Conservative	A. W. Lowe *	3,125	56%	
Labour	Mrs. C. A. George	2,484	44%	
Majority		641		
Registered electors		13,636		
Turnout		5,609	41%	
Conservative hold		Swing		

=== Westminster ===
Westminster
Party	Candidate	Votes	%	±%
Labour	E. Burke	1,921	67%	
Conservative	R. M. Jones	931	33%	
Majority		990		
Registered electors		8,104		
Turnout		2,852	35%	
Labour hold		Swing		

=== Woolton ===
Woolton
Party	Candidate	Votes	%	±%
Conservative	J. Norton	3,476	69%	
Labour	P. Grannell	1,588	31%	
Majority		1,888		
Registered electors		14,395		
Turnout		5,064	35%	
Conservative hold		Swing		

== Aldermanic Elections ==
At the meeting of the City Council on 19 May 1958 the terms of office of twenty of the forty Aldermen expired and the Councillors elected twenty Aldermen to fill the vacant positions for a term of six years.

Party	Alderman
Labour	J. J. Cleary*
Labour	A. Griffin*
Labour	D. Cowley*
Labour	J. Cullen*
Labour	I. I. Levin*
Labour	D. G. Logan*
Labour	P. J. O'Hare*
Labour	J. Sheehan*
Labour	M. J. Reppion*
Labour	John Braddock*
Labour	C. McDonald
Labour	H. Dalton
Conservative	H. N. Bewley*
Labour	T. H. Burton*
Conservative	W. Clark*
Conservative	A. Critchely*
Conservative	D. J. Lewis*
Conservative	H. T. Wilson*
Conservative	J. Village*
Conservative	???

- Reelected Aldermen
