= 1996 Liverpool City Council election =

1996 UK local government election

- 2 May 1996

33 seats were up for election (one third): one seat for each of the 33 wards 50 seats needed for a majority

Elections to Liverpool City Council were held on 2 May 1996. One third of the council was up for election and the Labour Party achieved overall control of the council.

After the election, the composition of the council was:

Party	Seats	±
Labour	50	??
Liberal Democrat	42	??
Liberal Party	3	??
Ward Labour	3	??

== Election results ==
Liverpool local election result 1996
Party	Seats	Gains	Losses	Net gain/loss	Seats %	Votes %	Votes	+/−
Liberal Democrats	17	0	0	0	52%	41%	37,557	
Labour	14	0	1	-1	42%	42%	38,416	
Ward Labour	2				6%	7%	4,162	
Liberal	1	0	0	0	3%	7%	6,821	
Conservative	0	0	0	0	0%	7%	6,047	
Independent								

== Ward results ==
=== Abercromby ===
Abercromby
Party	Candidate	Votes	%	±%
Labour	Sarah Norman	1,083	73%	▲2%
Liberal Democrats	Kevin Firth	113	8%	▼3%
Green	R. Spalding	100	7%	▼1%
Liberal	A. Carroll	109	7%	N/A
Conservative	C. Zsigmond	90	6%	▼4%
Majority		969		
Registered electors				
Turnout				
Labour hold		Swing		

=== Aigburth ===
Aigburth 2 seats
Party	Candidate	Votes	%	±%
Liberal Democrats	Cathy Hancox	2,185	58%	
Liberal Democrats	Dave Antrobus	1,856	51%	
Labour	J. Middleton	1,626	34%	
Labour	Joe Anderson	1,221	33%	
Conservative	A. McGing	343	9%	
Conservative	D. Patmore	315	9%	
Green	R. Lentle	230	6%	
Majority		899		
Turnout				

=== Allerton ===
Allerton
Party	Candidate	Votes	%	±%
Liberal Democrats	Rosie Cooper	1,947	56%	
Labour	M. Bailey	1,026	29%	
Allerton Liberal Democrats	C. Hulme	492	14%	
Conservative	F. Bate	454	13%	
Green	R. Cantwell	60	2%	
Majority		920		
Turnout				

=== Anfield ===
Anfield
Party	Candidate	Votes	%	±%
Labour	Alan Walker	1,427	47%	
Liberal Democrats	Richard Marbrow	1,189	39%	
Liberal	S. Brooks	315	10%	
Militant Labour	P. Filby	107	4%	
Majority		238		
Turnout				

=== Arundel ===
Arundel
Party	Candidate	Votes	%	±%
Liberal Democrats	Paul Clein	1,488	46%	
Labour	R. Gladden	1,392	44%	
Green	D. Ross	181	6%	
Conservative	K. Watkin	136	4%	
Majority		56		
Turnout				

=== Breckfield ===
Breckfield
Party	Candidate	Votes	%	±%
Labour	M. McGiveron	1,291	66%	
Liberal Democrats	Karren Afford	265	14%	
Liberal	J. McAllister	222	11%	
Militant Labour	J. Morris	59	3%	
Majority		1,026		
Turnout				

=== Broadgreen ===
Broadgreen
Party	Candidate	Votes	%	±%
Labour	M. McDaid	1,776	53%	
Liberal Democrats	J. McCabe	1,167	35%	
Liberal	T. Mills	196	6%	
Conservative	K. Sutton	194	6%	
Majority		609		
Turnout				

=== Childwall ===
Childwall
Party	Candidate	Votes	%	±%
Liberal Democrats	Eddie Clein	2,766	65%	
Labour	H. Adams	1,068	25%	
Conservative	C. Coffey	415	10%	
Majority		1,698		
Turnout				

=== Church ===
Church
Party	Candidate	Votes	%	±%
Liberal Democrats	Mike Storey	3,106	67%	
Labour	N. Harvey	1,014	22%	
Conservative	J. Mullans	362	8%	
Green	J. Brown	127	3%	
Majority		2,092		
Turnout				

=== Clubmoor ===
Clubmoor
Party	Candidate	Votes	%	±%
Labour	Steve Ellison	1,396	50%	
Liberal	B. Jackson	639	23%	
Ward Labour	A. Hincks	319	12%	
Liberal Democrats	H. Owen	252	9%	
Conservative	G. Hicklin	159	6%	
Majority		757		
Turnout				

=== County ===
County
Party	Candidate	Votes	%	±%
Liberal Democrats	Paul Clark	2,124	61%	
Labour	L. French	1,265	36%	
Conservative	J. Atkinson	57	2%	
Liberal	R. Webb	42	1%	
Majority		859		
Turnout				

=== Croxteth ===
Croxteth
Party	Candidate	Votes	%	±%
Liberal Democrats	E. Kinahan	2,758	63%	
Labour	G. Wood	1,004	23%	
Conservative	E. Nash	412	9%	
Liberal	R. Cameron	155	4%	
Green	I Graham	73	2%	
Majority		1,754		
Turnout				

=== Dingle ===
Dingle
Party	Candidate	Votes	%	±%
Liberal Democrats	Peter Allen	1,178	43%	
Labour	B. Williams	1,142	41%	
Ward Labour	S. Hilditch	172	6%	
Conservative	J. Watson	91	3%	
Majority		36		
Turnout				

=== Dovecot ===
Dovecot
Party	Candidate	Votes	%	±%
Labour	S. Renilson	1,192	62%	
Liberal	K. Buchanan	357	18%	
Liberal Democrats	L. Kinahan	277	14%	
Conservative	J. Brandwood	107	6%	
Majority		915		
Turnout				

=== Everton ===
Everton
Party	Candidate	Votes	%	±%
Ward Labour	George Knibb	781	58%	
Labour	F. Kidd	497	37%	
Liberal Democrats	K. Reid	48	4%	
Liberal	J. Mayes	22	2%	
Majority		284		
Turnout				

=== Fazakerley ===
Fazakerley
Party	Candidate	Votes	%	±%
Labour	Dave Hanratty	1,705	68%	
Liberal Democrats	A. Poole	616	25%	
Conservative	D. Johnston	192	8%	
Majority		1,089		
Turnout				

=== Gillmoss ===
Gillmoss
Party	Candidate	Votes	%	±%
Ward Labour	Alf Flatery	1,146	38%	
Labour	M. Black	1,026	34%	
Liberal Democrats	M. Hines	339	11%	
Liberal	F. Fall	331	11%	
Conservative	B. Jones	153	5%	
Majority		120		
Turnout				

=== Granby ===
Granby
Party	Candidate	Votes	%	±%
Labour	P. Tyrrell	1,250	74%	
Liberal Democrats	D. Forster-Green	166	10%	
Ward Labour	C. Wilson	166	10%	
Liberal	M. Wingfield	104	6%	
Majority		1,084		
Turnout				

=== Grassendale ===
Grassendale
Party	Candidate	Votes	%	±%
Liberal Democrats	Chris Curry	2,691	64%	
Labour	G. Lovegreen	969	23%	
Conservative	C. Cross	509	12%	
Natural Law	G. Mead	27	1%	
Majority		1,722		
Turnout				

=== Kensington ===
Kensington
Party	Candidate	Votes	%	±%
Liberal Democrats	Jimmy Kendrick	1,597	55%	
Labour	R. Kennedy	1,097	38%	
Kensington Liberal Democrat	A. Hulme	161	6%	
Ward Labour	A. Dunn	108	4%	
Liberal	M. Bickley	68	2%	
Conservative	I. McFall	48	2%	
Majority		500		
Turnout				

=== Melrose ===
Melrose
Party	Candidate	Votes	%	±%
Labour	W. Owen	1,509	71%	
Liberal	D. Mayes	358	17%	
Militant Labour	L. Mahmood	168	8%	
Conservative	A. Nugent	86	4%	
Majority		1,509		
Turnout				

=== Netherley ===
Netherley
Party	Candidate	Votes	%	±%
Labour	Joe Devaney	956	62%	
Liberal Democrats	Tommy Marshall	393	25%	
Independent	J. Courtney	94	6%	
Conservative	I. Prosser	58	4%	
Liberal	N. Roberts	50	3%	
Independent	M. Fowler	46	3%	
Majority		563		
Turnout				

=== Old Swan ===
Old Swan
Party	Candidate	Votes	%	±%
Liberal Democrats	Bernie Turner	1,034	41%	
Labour	M. Lyons	774	30%	
Socialist Labour	G. Lloyd	451	18%	
Liberal	H. Williams	156	6%	
Conservative	R. Bethell	138	5%	
Old Swan Liberal Democrat	M. McNeilly	128	5%	
Majority		260		
Turnout				

=== Picton ===
Picton
Party	Candidate	Votes	%	±%
Liberal Democrats	Richard Kemp	1,693	57%	
Labour	K. Bradley	1,221	41%	
Conservative	T. Coffey	70	2%	
Picton Liberal Democrat	W. Barrow	136	5%	
Majority		472		
Turnout				

=== Pirrie ===
Pirrie
Party	Candidate	Votes	%	±%
Labour	Dot Gavin	1,351	66%	
Liberal Democrats	P. Dutton	273	13%	
Liberal	C. Mayes	163	8%	
Conservative	F. Stevens	137	7%	
Ward Labour	J. Kidd	124	6%	
Majority		1,078		
Turnout				

=== St. Mary's ===
St. Mary's
Party	Candidate	Votes	%	±%
Liberal Democrats	Peter Millea	2,206	67%	
Labour	P. Hughes	1,006	31%	
Conservative	G. Harden	58	2%	
Majority		1,200		
Turnout				

=== Smithdown ===
Smithdown
Party	Candidate	Votes	%	±%
Labour	R. White	960	63%	
Liberal Democrats	Garry Airey	353	23%	
Liberal	K. White	222	14%	
Majority		607		
Turnout				

=== Speke ===
Speke
Party	Candidate	Votes	%	±%
Labour	F. Anderson	1,028	75%	
Liberal Democrats	M. McKenna	276	20%	
Conservative	T. Morrison	75	5%	
Majority		752		
Turnout				

=== Tuebrook ===
Tuebrook
Party	Candidate	Votes	%	±%
Liberal	S. Radford	2,888	74%	
Labour	B. Lawless	751	19%	
Liberal Democrats	J. Richardson	159	4%	
Conservative	G. Brandwood	80	2%	
Majority		2,137		
Turnout				

=== Valley ===
Valley
Party	Candidate	Votes	%	±%
Liberal Democrats	Ian Phillips	1,318	50%	
Labour	M. Fitzsimmons	965	37%	
Ward Labour	J. Marston	210	8%	
Liberal	W. McGrady	67	3%	
Conservative	J. Matthews	61	2%	
Majority		353		
Turnout				

=== Vauxhall ===
Vauxhall
Party	Candidate	Votes	%	±%
Labour	Paul Orr	1,100	71%	
Ward Labour	J. Long	351	23%	
Liberal Democrats	A. Connor	60	4%	
Liberal	I. Mayes	39	3%	
Majority		1,040		
Turnout				

=== Warbreck ===
Warbreck
Party	Candidate	Votes	%	±%
Liberal Democrats	Richard Roberts	2,029	51%	
Labour	P. Harvey	1,751	44%	
Conservative	D. Gray	180	5%	
Majority		278		
Turnout				

=== Woolton ===
Woolton
Party	Candidate	Votes	%	±%
Liberal Democrats	Malcolm Kelly	1,725	40%	
Conservative	H. Rigby	1,288	30%	
Labour	S. Owens	1,201	28%	
Liberal	M. Langley	152	3%	
Majority		524		
Turnout				

== By-Elections ==
=== Melrose, 11 December 1997 ===
Melrose By-Election 11 December 1997
Party	Candidate	Votes	%	±%
Melrose Ward Labour	Alfie Hincks	272	38.6	+38.6
Labour		217	30.4	−40.8
Liberal Democrats		180	25.6	+25.6
Socialist		35	5.0	+5.0
Majority		55	8.2	
Turnout		704	5.9	
Independent gain from Labour		Swing		

== See also ==
- Liverpool City Council
- Liverpool Town Council elections 1835 - 1879
- Liverpool City Council elections 1880–present
- Mayors and Lord Mayors of Liverpool 1207 to present
- History of local government in England
