= 1995 Liverpool City Council election =

1995 UK local government election

- 4 May 1995

34 seats were up for election (one third): one seat for each of the 33 wards, plus one by-election 50 seats needed for a majority

Elections to Liverpool City Council were held on 4 May 1995. One third of the council was up for election and although the election resulted in the continuation of no overall control, the Labour Party continued to lead a minority administration.

After the election, the composition of the council was:

Party	Seats	±
Labour	??	??
Liberal Democrat	??	??
Liberal Party	??	??
Independent	??	??
Others	??	??

== Election results ==
Liverpool local election result 1995
Party	Seats	Gains	Losses	Net gain/loss	Seats %	Votes %	Votes	+/−
Labour	21	+4			63%	48%	50,600	
Liberal Democrats	12		1		36%	39%	40,913	
Conservative	0	0	1	-1	0%	6%	5,912	
Liberal	1	0	0	0	3%	5%	4,999	
Green	0	0	0	0	0%	1%	696	
Independent	0	0	0	0	0%	0.1%	93	
Natural Law	0	0	0	0	0%	0.03%	36	

== Ward results ==
=== Abercromby ===
Abercromby (2 seats)
Party	Candidate	Votes	%	±%
Labour	A. Cleary	1,404	75%	▼2%
Labour	S. Watson	1,265	67%	▼10%
Liberal Democrats	Nigel Dyer	151	8%	▼7%
Green	R. Spalding	145	8%	N/A
Liberal Democrats	John Clucas	141	8%	▼7%
Conservative	P. Edwards	97	5%	▼3%
Majority		1,253		
Registered electors				
Turnout				
Labour hold		Swing	▼2%	
Labour hold		Swing	▼10%	

=== Aigburth ===
Aigburth
Party	Candidate	Votes	%	±%
Liberal Democrats	J. Thomson	1,773	46%	
Labour	J. Middleton	1,475	38%	
Conservative	A. McGing	419	11%	
Green	R. Lentle	177	5%	
Majority		298		
Turnout		3,844		

=== Allerton ===
Allerton
Party	Candidate	Votes	%	±%
Liberal Democrats	Vera Best	2,158	51%	
Labour	G. Jones	1,404	33%	
Conservative	F. Bate	548	13%	
Green	R. Cantwell	86	3%	
Natural Law	S. Cohen	8	0.2%	
Majority		754		
Turnout		4,204		

=== Anfield ===
Anfield
Party	Candidate	Votes	%	±%
Labour	G. Wilson	1,558	47%	
Liberal Democrats	Peter Allen	1,347	41%	
Conservative	C. Coffey	110	3%	
Liberal	J. Kehoe	266	8%	
Majority		211		
Turnout		3,281		

=== Arundel ===
Arundel
Party	Candidate	Votes	%	±%
Labour	Paul Brant	1,667	50%	
Liberal Democrats	Roger Johnston	1,343	40%	
Conservative	K. Edwards	140	4%	
Green	A. Willan	169	5%	
Majority		334		
Turnout		3,329		

=== Breckfield ===
Breckfield
Party	Candidate	Votes	%	±%
Labour	J. McIntosh	1,607	72%	
Liberal Democrats	Karren Afford	224	10%	
Liberal	B. Edwards	136	6%	
Militant Labour	J. Mcintosh ??	144	6%	
Majority		1,383		
Turnout		2,224		

=== Broadgreen ===
Broadgreen
Party	Candidate	Votes	%	±%
Labour	Chris Newby	1,996	51%	
Liberal Democrats	Chris Curry	1,639	42%	
Conservative	R. Bethell	133	42%	
Liberal	C. Serjeant	158	4%	
Majority		357		
Turnout		3,926		

=== Childwall ===
Childwall
Party	Candidate	Votes	%	±%
Liberal Democrats	Frank Ruse	3,139	64%	
Labour	Dr. H. Gibson	1,403	28%	
Conservative	P. Dougherty	395	8%	
Majority		1,736		
Turnout		4,937		

=== Church ===
Church
Party	Candidate	Votes	%	±%
Liberal Democrats	C. Roberts	3,048	62%	
Labour	N. Harvey	1,474	30%	
Conservative	M. Williams	422	9%	
Majority		1,574		
Turnout		4,944		

=== Clubmoor ===
Clubmoor
Party	Candidate	Votes	%	±%
Labour	George Smith	1,994	60%	
Liberal	B. Jackson	964	29%	
Liberal Democrats	L. Kinahan	235	7%	
Conservative	G. Brandwood	128	4%	
Majority		1,769		
Turnout		3,321		

=== County ===
County
Party	Candidate	Votes	%	±%
Liberal Democrats	M. Fielding	2,447	58%	
Labour	J. Hamilton	1,647	39%	
Conservative	J. Atkinson	80	2%	
Liberal	L. Alderdice	72	2%	
Majority		800		
Turnout		4,246		

=== Croxteth ===
Croxteth
Party	Candidate	Votes	%	±%
Liberal Democrats	Norman Mills	2,778	57%	
Labour	B. McGrath	1,539	32%	
Conservative	E. Nash	345	7%	
Liberal	S. Owen	150	3%	
Green	I. Graham	67	1%	
Majority		1,239		
Turnout		4,879		

=== Dingle ===
Dingle
Party	Candidate	Votes	%	±%
Labour	F. Orr	1,641	54%	
Liberal Democrats	John Clucas	1,241	42%	
Conservative	D. Patmore	111	4%	
Majority		357		
Turnout		3,036		

=== Dovecot ===
Dovecot
Party	Candidate	Votes	%	±%
Labour	R. Quinn	1,570	72%	
Liberal Democrats	Andrew Tremarco	268	12%	
Liberal	K. Buchanan	224	10%	
Conservative	J. Brandwood	108	5%	
Majority		1,302		
Turnout		2,170		

=== Everton ===
Everton
Party	Candidate	Votes	%	±%
Labour	J. Rutledge	973	87%	
Liberal Democrats	Jeremy Chowings	144	13%	
Majority		829		
Turnout		1,117		

=== Fazakerley ===
Fazakerley
Party	Candidate	Votes	%	±%
Labour	Jack Spriggs	2,281	72%	
Liberal Democrats	A. Poole	395	13%	
Liberal	P. Mayne	194	6%	
Conservative	D. Johnson	178	6%	
Militant Labour	K. Dunne	110	3%	
Majority		1,886		
Turnout		3,158		

=== Gillmoss ===
Gillmoss
Party	Candidate	Votes	%	±%
Labour	W. Craig	1,481	44%	
Gilmoss Labour	M. Alderson	1,221	36%	
Liberal Democrats	H. Owen	306	9%	
Liberal	F. Fall	204	6%	
Conservative	B. Jones	121	4%	
Green	A. Graham	52	2%	
Majority		1,175		
Turnout		3,385		

=== Granby ===
Granby
Party	Candidate	Votes	%	±%
Labour	Alan Dean	1,332	65%	
Liberal Democrats	Richard Clein	267	13%	
Conservative	J. McEachern	70	3%	
Militant Labour	C. Wilson	219	11%	
Liberal	M. Wingfield	72	4%	
Independent	J. Farrag	60	3%	
Independent	G. Muies	33	2%	
Majority		1,965		
Turnout		2,053		

=== Grassendale ===
Grassendale
Party	Candidate	Votes	%	±%
Liberal Democrats	Gerry Scott	2,777	64%	
Labour	G. Lovgreen	1,176	27%	
Conservative	C. Cross	381	9%	
Natural Law	Dr. G. Mead	28	0.6%	
Majority		1,601		
Turnout		4,362		

=== Kensington ===
Kensington
Party	Candidate	Votes	%	±%
Liberal Democrats	Frank Doran	1,962	54%	
Labour	A. Walker	1,506	42%	
Conservative	I. MacFall	63	2%	
Liberal	M. Bickley	82	2%	
Majority		456		
Turnout		3,613		

=== Melrose ===
Melrose
Party	Candidate	Votes	%	±%
Labour	R. Lancaster	1,912	73%	
Liberal Democrats	P. Salter	385	15%	
Militant Labour	L. Mahmood	201	8%	
Conservative	A. Nugent	108	4%	
Majority		1,527		
Turnout		2,606		

=== Netherley ===
Netherley
Party	Candidate	Votes	%	±%
Labour	Oliver Martins	1,185	61%	
Liberal Democrats	D. Seddon	446	23%	
Netherley Labour	M. Bolland	290	15%	
Conservative	I. Prosser	36	2%	
Majority		739		
Turnout		1,957		

=== Old Swan ===
Old Swan
Party	Candidate	Votes	%	±%
Liberal Democrats	Keith Turner	1,207	34%	
Labour	W. Owen	1,184	33%	
Old Swan Independent Labour	G. Lloyd	810	23%	
Conservative	G. Powell	114	3%	
Liberal	E. Carroll	234	7%	
Majority		23		
Turnout		3,549		

=== Picton ===
Picton
Party	Candidate	Votes	%	±%
Liberal Democrats	Erica Plant	2,005	57%	
Labour	R. White	1,429	41%	
Conservative	T. Coffey	85	2%	
Majority		576		
Turnout		3,519		

=== Pirrie ===
Pirrie
Party	Candidate	Votes	%	±%
Labour	J. Goulbourne	1,879	77%	
Liberal Democrats	P. Dutton	296	12%	
Liberal	C. Maynes	156	6%	
Conservative	F. Stevens	99	4%	
Majority		1,583		
Turnout		2,430		

=== St. Mary's ===
St. Mary's
Party	Candidate	Votes	%	±%
Labour	M. Harrison	1,680	50%	
Liberal Democrats	C. Hulme	1,609	48%	
Conservative	G. Harden	81	2%	
Majority		71		
Turnout		3,370		

=== Smithdown ===
Smithdown
Party	Candidate	Votes	%	±%
Labour	M. Clarke	1,286	69%	
Liberal Democrats	G. Hulme	465	25%	
Liberal	N. Roberts	81	4%	
Conservative	K. Watkin	28	2%	
Majority		821		
Turnout		1,860		

=== Speke ===
Speke
Party	Candidate	Votes	%	±%
Labour	P. Coventry	1,430	66%	
Liberal Democrats	W. Hughes	686	32%	
Conservative	T. Morrison	56	3%	
Majority		744		
Turnout		2,172		

=== Tuebrook ===
Tuebrook
Party	Candidate	Votes	%	±%
Liberal	K. McCullough	1,799	48%	
Labour	B. Lawless	1,124	30%	
Liberal Democrats	N. Cardwell	720	19%	
Conservative	S. Lennard	97	3%	
Majority		675		
Turnout		3,740		

=== Valley ===
Valley
Party	Candidate	Votes	%	±%
Labour	E. Devaney	1,230	51%	
Liberal Democrats	F. Dobie	1,086	45%	
Conservative	J. Matthews	79	3%	
Majority		144		
Turnout		2,395		

=== Vauxhall ===
Vauxhall
Party	Candidate	Votes	%	±%
Labour	J. Livingston	1,524	74%	
Ward Labour	M. Jordan	478	23%	
Liberal Democrats	Richard Marbrow	64	3%	
Majority		1,460		
Turnout		2,066		

=== Warbreck ===
Warbreck
Party	Candidate	Votes	%	±%
Liberal Democrats	Joe Lang	2,354	55%	
Labour	D. Dunphy	1,775	41%	
Conservative	D. Gray	125	3%	
Liberal	I. Mayes	35	1%	
Majority		579		
Turnout		4,289		

=== Woolton ===
Woolton
Party	Candidate	Votes	%	±%
Liberal Democrats	B. Lewis	1,910	39%	
Labour	P. McKibbin	1,893	38%	
Conservative	Dr. E. Williams	1,042	21%	
Liberal	M. Langley	91	2%	
Majority		17		
Turnout		4,936		
