= 1961 Liverpool City Council election =

1961 UK local election

- 11 May 1961
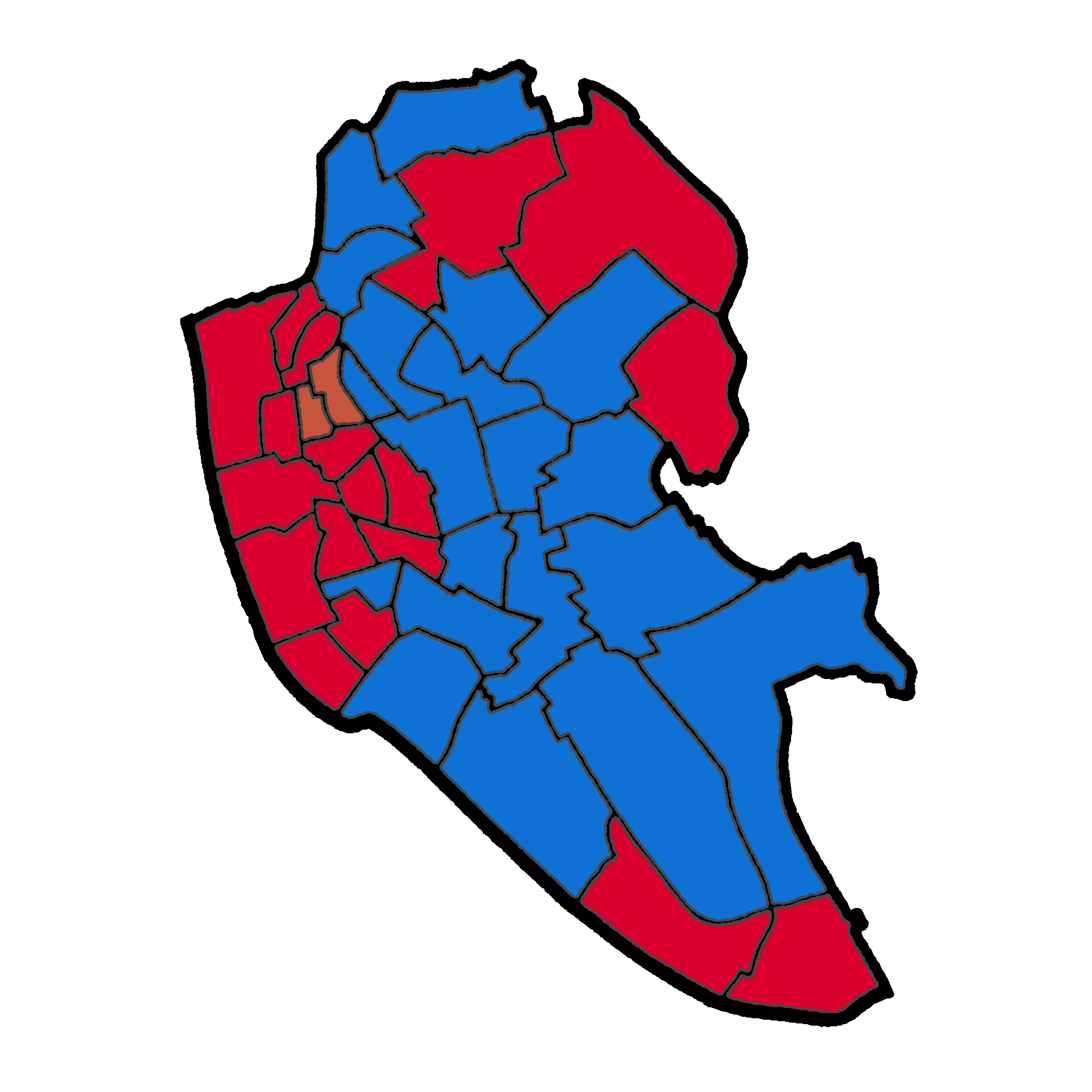
- Map of Liverpool showing wards won (first placed party)

Elections to Liverpool City Council were held on 11 May 1961.

After the election, the composition of the council was:

Party	Councillors	±	Aldermen	Total
Labour	52	-8	32	84
Conservative	63	+8	7*	70
Protestant	5	+2	0	5

- One Conservative Aldermanic vacancy following the death of C. G. S. Gordon.

== Election result ==
Liverpool local election result 1961
Party	Seats	Gains	Losses	Net gain/loss	Seats %	Votes %	Votes	+/−
Conservative	21	8	0	+8	50%	57%	95,863	
Labour	19	0	8	-8	45%	42%	71,299	
Protestant	2	2	0	+2	4.8%	2.1%	3,572	
Liberal	0	0	0	0	0%	4.2%	7,073	
Communist	0	0	0	0	0%	0.21%	350	
Public Safety	0	0	0	0	0%	0.44%	738	
Union Movement	0	0	0	0	0%	0.07%	112	

== Ward results ==
* - Councillor seeking re-election

^{(PARTY)} - Party of former Councillor

The Councillors seeking re-election at this election were elected in 1958 for a three-year term, therefore comparisons are made with the 1958 election results.

=== Abercromby ===
Abercromby
Party	Candidate	Votes	%	±%
Labour	J. E. McPherson ^{(PARTY)}	1,356	54%	+2%
Conservative	G. W. Boult	1,052	42%	+9%
Union Movement	H. Taylor	112	4%	+4%
Majority		304		
Registered electors		10,052		
Turnout		2,520	25%	−6%
Labour hold		Swing		

=== Aigburth ===
Aigburth 2 seats
Party	Candidate	Votes	%	±%
Conservative	W. A. Kinear *	4,494	92%	+20%
Conservative	S. A. Cotton ^{(PARTY)}	4,368	90%	+18%
Labour	G. Ackers	371	8%	+2%
Labour	J. G. Morgan	354	7%	+1%
Majority		4,123		
Registered electors		13.783		
Turnout		4,865	35%	−6%
Conservative hold		Swing		
Conservative hold		Swing		

=== Allerton ===
Allerton
Party	Candidate	Votes	%	±%
Conservative	S. Minion *	2,919	84%	+4%
Labour	J. Woolwich	565	16%	−4%
Majority		2,354		
Registered electors		10,174		
Turnout		3,484	34%	−1%
Conservative hold		Swing		

=== Anfield ===
Anfield 2 seats
Party	Candidate	Votes	%	±%
Conservative	J. A. Porter *	3,918	69%	+11%
Conservative	R. G. Semple ^{(PARTY)}	3,795	67%	+9%
Labour	S. W. Jones	1,771	31%	−11%
Labour	F. Shemmonds	1,712	30%	−12%
Majority		2,147		
Registered electors		14,013		
Turnout		5,689	41%	+1%
Conservative hold		Swing		
Conservative hold		Swing		

=== Arundel ===
Arundel
Party	Candidate	Votes	%	±%
Conservative	H. Lees *	2,546	59%	+2%
Labour	P. Grannell	918	21%	−19%
Liberal	R. M. Bale	703	16%	+16%
Communist	J. Kay	142	3%	0%
Majority		1,628		
Registered electors		12,358		
Turnout		4,309	35%	−1%
Conservative hold		Swing		

=== Breckfield ===
Breckfield
Party	Candidate	Votes	%	±%
Conservative	F. Parry	2,263	55%	+14%
Labour	A. Williams ^{(PARTY)}	1,861	45%	−14%
Majority		402		
Registered electors		11,074		
Turnout		4,124	37%	−2%
Conservative gain from Labour		Swing		

=== Broadgreen ===
Broadgreen
Party	Candidate	Votes	%	±%
Conservative	L. T. Rogers *	2,774	77%	+12%
Labour	W. M. Cooper	504	14%	−21%
Public Safety	A. Anderson	298	8%	
Majority		2,240		
Registered electors		11,623		
Turnout		3,546	31%	−4%
Conservative hold		Swing		

=== Central ===
Central
Party	Candidate	Votes	%	±%
Labour	Miss M. Schofield *	1,555	55%	−4%
Conservative	A. McKie Reid	1,286	45%	+4%
Majority		269		
Registered electors		8,788		
Turnout		2,841	32%	0%
Labour hold		Swing		

=== Childwall ===
Childwall
Party	Candidate	Votes	%	±%
Conservative	A. Young *	3,927	64%	+5%
Liberal	Albert Globe	1,645	27%	−6%
Labour	W. Lungley	578	9%	+1%
Majority		3,349		
Registered electors		15,727		
Turnout		6,150	39%	−2%
Conservative hold		Swing		

=== Church ===
Church
Party	Candidate	Votes	%	±%
Conservative	J. H. Elderton ^{(PARTY)}	3,539	56%	−12%
Liberal	Cyril E. Carr	2,331	37%	+17%
Labour	J. Disley	397	6%	−6%
Majority		1,208		
Registered electors		13,595		
Turnout		6,287	46%	+8%
Conservative hold		Swing		

=== Clubmoor ===
Clubmoor
Party	Candidate	Votes	%	±%
Conservative	N. A. Williams *	2,718	57%	+7%
Labour	G. A. McAllister	2,091	43%	
Majority		627		
Registered electors		11,423		
Turnout		4,809	42%	−3%
Conservative hold		Swing		

=== County ===
County
Party	Candidate	Votes	%	±%
Labour	R. B. Flude ^{(PARTY)}	3,384	53%	−6%
Conservative	B. Deane	2,936	47%	+6%
Majority		438		
Registered electors		13.712		
Turnout		6,330	46%	−1%
Labour hold		Swing		

=== Croxteth ===
Croxteth
Party	Candidate	Votes	%	±%
Conservative	A. Morrow ^{(PARTY)}	4,022	78%	+6%
Labour	H. W. Dolman	1,144	22%	−6%
Majority		2,878		
Registered electors		11,610		
Turnout		5,166	44%	−1%
Conservative hold		Swing		

=== Dingle ===
Dingle
Party	Candidate	Votes	%	±%
Labour	R. Stoddart *	2,288	52%	−14%
Conservative	C. N. Peplow	1,695	38%	+4%
Liberal	Jack F. Ross	443	10%	+10%
Majority		593		
Registered electors		12,707		
Turnout		4,426	35%	−3%
Labour hold		Swing		

=== Dovecot ===
Dovecot
Party	Candidate	Votes	%	±%
Labour	T. H. Maloney *	2,386	51%	−17%
Conservative	E. Johnson	2,307	49%	+17%
Majority		79		
Registered electors		14,463		
Turnout		4,693	32%	+5%
Labour hold		Swing		

=== Everton ===
Everton
Party	Candidate	Votes	%	±%
Labour	Francis Burke *	1,607	64%	
Conservative	E. Shaw	813	32%	
Communist	A. E. Rivers	105	4%	
Majority		794		
Registered electors		10,768		
Turnout		2,525	23%	
Labour hold		Swing		

=== Fairfield ===
Fairfield
Party	Candidate	Votes	%	±%
Conservative	J. S. Ross *	2,373	61%	+11%
Labour	T. Roberts	967	25%	−25%
Liberal	S. R. Jolly	569	15%	+15%
Majority		1,406		
Registered electors		14,019		
Turnout		3,909	28%	−5%
Conservative hold		Swing		

=== Fazakerley ===
Fazakerley
Party	Candidate	Votes	%	±%
Conservative	R. Bessell	3,251	58%	+10%
Labour	F. Grue *	2,371	42%	−10%
Majority		880		
Registered electors		11,569		
Turnout		5.622	48%	−5%
Conservative gain from Labour		Swing		

=== Gillmoss ===
Gillmoss
Party	Candidate	Votes	%	±%
Labour	E. D. Roderick *	3,428	66%	−6%
Conservative	G. K. McKelvie	1,743	34%	+6%
Majority		1,685		
Registered electors		15,917		
Turnout		5,171	32%	−2%
Labour hold		Swing		

=== Granby ===
Granby
Party	Candidate	Votes	%	±%
Labour	Mrs. R. Dean	1,943	53%	+17%
Conservative	J. Guinan	1,746	47%	−17%
Majority		197		
Registered electors		11,288		
Turnout		3,689	33%	+3%
Conservative gain from Labour		Swing		

=== Kensington ===
Kensington
Party	Candidate	Votes	%	±%
Labour	Mrs. E. M. Wormald *	2,401	50%	−17%
Conservative	A. L. Audley	2,252	47%	+14%
Public Safety	J. R. Gradwell	145	3%	+3%
Majority		149		
Registered electors		12,293		
Turnout			39%	+5%
Labour hold		Swing		

=== Low Hill ===
Low Hill
Party	Candidate	Votes	%	±%
Labour	Mrs. M. M. Powell *	1,758	58%	−12%
Conservative	E, Crierie	1,285	42%	+12%
Majority		473		
Registered electors		9,564		
Turnout		3,043	32%	0%
Labour hold		Swing		

=== Melrose ===
Melrose
Party	Candidate	Votes	%	±%
Labour	A. MacDonald *	1,616	63%	−10%
Conservative	S. D. Lunt	951	37%	+10%
Majority		665		
Registered electors		9,466		
Turnout		2,567	27%	−3%
Labour hold		Swing		

=== Netherfield ===
Netherfield
Party	Candidate	Votes	%	±%
Protestant	A. Brown	1,409	58%	+58%
Labour	R. Clitherow *	1,020	42%	−12%
Majority		389		
Registered electors		8,626		
Turnout		2,429	28%	0%
Protestant gain from Labour		Swing		

=== Old Swan ===
Old Swan
Party	Candidate	Votes	%	±%
Conservative	W. F. Everett	3,103	56%	+12%
Labour	J. A. Dunn *	2,416	44%	−9%
Majority		687		
Registered electors		14,965		
Turnout		5,519	37%	−2%
Conservative gain from Labour		Swing		

=== Picton ===
Picton
Party	Candidate	Votes	%	±%
Conservative	J. Polack	3,124	54%	+10%
Labour	G. R. Sullivan *	2,623	46%	−10%
Majority		501		
Registered electors		14,096		
Turnout		5,747	41%	+1%
Conservative gain from Labour		Swing		

=== Pirrie ===
Pirrie
Party	Candidate	Votes	%	±%
Labour	W. H. Hart ^{(PARTY)}	3,920	55%	−11%
Conservative	J. P. Bailey	3,147	45%	+11%
Majority		773		
Registered electors		16,656		
Turnout		7,067	42%	
Labour hold		Swing		

=== Prince's Park ===
Prince's Park
Party	Candidate	Votes	%	±%
Labour	T. C. Greenwood *	2,078	45%	−19%
Conservative	W. T. Savage	1,954	42%	+6%
Liberal	D. B. McClaren	597	13%	+13%
Majority		124		
Registered electors		13,182		
Turnout		4,629	35%	+3%
Labour hold		Swing		

=== Sandhills ===
Sandhills
Party	Candidate	Votes	%	±%
Labour	W. H. Aldritt *	1,842	86%	−8%
Conservative	A. C. Bailey	207	10%	+4%
Communist	B.Campbell	103	5%	+5%
Majority		1,635		
Registered electors		8,758		
Turnout		2,152	25%	−3%
Labour hold		Swing		

=== St. Domingo ===
St. Domingo
Party	Candidate	Votes	%	±%
Protestant	R. F. Henderson	2,163	50%	
Labour	J. Gardner *	2,147	50%	
Majority		16		
Registered electors		11,770		
Turnout		4,310	37%	
Protestant gain from Labour		Swing		

=== St. James ===
St. James
Party	Candidate	Votes	%	±%
Labour	Mrs. E. E. Gough *	1,544	67%	−15%
Conservative	B. Ingham	747	33%	+15%
Majority		797		
Registered electors		10,783		
Turnout		797	21%	−3%
Labour hold		Swing		

=== St. Mary's ===
St. Mary's
Party	Candidate	Votes	%	±%
Labour	S. R. Maddox *	2,394	51%	−11%
Conservative	S. B. Caulfield	2,206	47%	+9%
Public Safety	T. J. Anderson	108	2%	+2%
Majority		188		
Registered electors		11,220		
Turnout		4,708	42%	
Labour hold		Swing		

=== St. Michael's ===
St. Michael's
Party	Candidate	Votes	%	±%
Conservative	C. Cowlin *	2,555	67%	0%
Liberal	J. R. Wilmington	674	18%	+18%
Labour	Mrs. M. Wills	370	10%	−23%
Public Safety	A. P. Cooney	187	5%	+5%
Majority		1,881		
Registered electors		10,034		
Turnout		3,786	38%	+1%
Conservative hold		Swing		

=== Smithdown ===
Smithdown
Party	Candidate	Votes	%	±%
Labour	G. W. Clarke *	1,905	64%	−15%
Conservative	H. Hawkins	1,050	36%	+15%
Majority		855		
Registered electors		12,238		
Turnout		2,955	24%	−1%
Labour hold		Swing		

=== Speke ===
Speke
Party	Candidate	Votes	%	±%
Labour	B. Crookes *	2,235	68%	−6%
Conservative	P. S. Jones	1,049	32%	+6%
Majority		1,186		
Registered electors		14,032		
Turnout		3,284	23%	−2%
Labour hold		Swing		

=== Tuebrook ===
Tuebrook
Party	Candidate	Votes	%	±%
Conservative	R. H. Aymes	2,879	56%	+10%
Labour	B. Shaw *	2,222	44%	−10%
Majority		657		
Registered electors		12,770		
Turnout		5,101	40%	−3%
Conservative gain from Labour		Swing		

=== Vauxhall ===
Vauxhall
Party	Candidate	Votes	%	±%
Labour	J. P. Shannon *	1,216	81%	−16%
Communist	T. E. Cassin	171	11%	+8%
Liberal	C. K. Rowland	111	7%	+7%
Majority		1,045		
Registered electors		9,353		
Turnout		1,498	16%	−5%
Labour hold		Swing		

=== Warbreck ===
Warbreck
Party	Candidate	Votes	%	±%
Conservative	A. W. Lowe *	3,060	67%	+11%
Labour	R. Buckle	1,517	33%	−11%
Majority		1,543		
Registered electors		12,923		
Turnout		4,577	35%	−6%
Conservative hold		Swing		

=== Westminster ===
Westminster
Party	Candidate	Votes	%	±%
Labour	E. Burke *	1,420	50%	−17%
Conservative	W. Gilbody	1,402	50%	+17%
Majority		18		
Registered electors		7,630		
Turnout		2,822	37%	+2%
Labour hold		Swing		

=== Woolton ===
Woolton
Party	Candidate	Votes	%	±%
Conservative	J. Norton *	4,230	76%	+7%
Labour	J. F. Cloherty	1,301	24%	−7%
Majority		2,929		
Registered electors		16,490		
Turnout		5,531	34%	−1%
Conservative hold		Swing		

== Aldermanic elections ==
At the meeting of the City Council on 24 May 1961 the terms of office of twenty of the forty Aldermen expired and the Councillors elected twenty Aldermen to fill the vacant positions for a term of six years. Eighteen of the twenty retiring Labour Aldermen were replaced with Conservatives.

Party	Alderman
Labour	John Leslie Hughes*
Labour	Peter McKernan* (Lord Mayor)
Conservative	Herbert Mylrea Allen
Conservative	Alfred Nathaniel Bates
Conservative	Gordon Frederick Catlin
Conservative	Arthur Brierley Collins
Conservative	Charles Cowlin
Conservative	Charles Haswell
Conservative	Harold William Hughes
Conservative	Harold Lees
Conservative	Arthur Whitaker Lowe
Conservative	Robert Meadows
Conservative	Stephen Minion
Conservative	Ralph Rattray
Conservative	Leslie Thomas Rogers
Conservative	Leslie Hebron Sanders
Conservative	Harold Macdonald Steward
Conservative	James Edward Thompson
Conservative	Frank Woolfenden
Conservative	Alexander Young

- Returned Alderman
