= Aigburth (Liverpool ward) =

Metropolitan borough council ward in England

- Aigburth ward within Liverpool
- Population: 5,560 (2021 census)
- Registered Electors: 4,081 (2023 elections)
- Metropolitan borough: City of Liverpool
- Metropolitan county: Merseyside
- Region: North West
- Country: England
- Sovereign state: United Kingdom
- UK Parliament: Liverpool Wavertree
- Councillors: vacant

Aigburth ward is an electoral district of Liverpool City Council within the Liverpool Wavertree Parliamentary constituency.

== Background ==
The ward was created in 1902 within the Liverpool East Toxteth constituency, when three councillors were elected. The boundaries were altered for the 1953 election, 1973 and 1980 elections. Between 1950 and 1983 it was within the Liverpool Garston constituency and between 1983 and 1997 the Liverpool Mossley Hill constituency.

=== 1980 boundaries ===
1980 ward boundaries

A report of the Local Government Boundary Commission for England published in November 1978 set out proposals for changes to the wards of Liverpool City Council, maintaining the number of councillors at 99 representing 33 wards. Aigburth ward was represented by three councillors.

The report describes the boundaries as "Commencing at a point where the western boundary of the City meets the southeastern boundary of Dingle Ward, thence northeastwards along said boundary and northwestwards along the northeastern boundary of said ward to the southeastern boundary of Granby Ward, thence northeastwards along said boundary to the southern boundary of Arundel Ward, thence northeastwards, southeastwards and generally eastwards along said boundary to the southwestern boundary of Church Ward, thence southeastwards along said boundary and continuing along the railway to a point being the prolongation northeastwards of Kirkraore Road, thence southwestwards along said prolongation and said road, crossing Brodie Avenue and Cooper Avenue North and continuing southwestwards along Mentmore Road to Mossley Hill Road, thence southwards along said road to Holmefield Road, thence southwestwards along said road, to Aigburth Road, thence northwestwards along said road to Alresford Road, thence southwestwards along said road to Hailsham Road, thence northwestwards along said road to Mersey Road, thence southwestwards along said road to Otterspool Drive, thence due southwestwards to the western boundary of the City, thence northwestwards along said boundary to the point of commencement".

=== 2004 election ===
The ward was dissolved in 2004 where it was distributed into the new St Michael's, Mossley Hill and Greenbank wards.

=== 2023 boundaries ===
A 2022 review by the Local Government Boundary Commission for England decided that the existing 30 wards each represented by three Councillors should be replaced by 64 wards represented by 85 councillors with varying representation by one, two or three councillors per ward. The Aigburth ward was reinstated as a smaller, single-member ward from a section of the previous Mossley Hill ward.

The new ward boundaries follow Aigburth Vale, Elmswood Road, North Sudley Road, behind Barkhill Road, Aigburth Road, behind Liverpool Cricket Club and the Alfred Holt Athletic Ground, the River Mersey, Jericho Lane and Otterspool Road. The ward contains Otterspool Promenade, Aigburth railway station, and St Margaret's Church of England Academy.

The population of the ward at the 2021 census was 5,560.

== Councillors ==
Election	Councillor	Councillor	Councillor
1902	Arthur Twiss Kemble (Con)	Archibald Bathgate (Lib)	William Hall Jowett (Con)
1903	John Salmon (Con)	Archibald Bathgate (Lib)	William Hall Jowett (Con)
1904	John Salmon (Con)	Archibald Bathgate (Lib)	William Hall Jowett (Con)
1905	John Salmon (Con)	Archibald Bathgate (Lib)	Hartley Wilson (Con)
1906	Albert Edward Jacob (Lib)	Archibald Bathgate (Lib)	Hartley Wilson (Con)
1907	Albert Edward Jacob (Lib)	William Parkfield Wethered (Con)	Hartley Wilson (Con)
1908	Albert Edward Jacob (Lib)	William Parkfield Wethered (Con)	Hartley Wilson (Con)
1909	Albert Edward Jacob (Lib)	William Parkfield Wethered (Con)	Hartley Wilson (Con)
1910	Albert Edward Jacob (Lib)	William Parkfield Wethered (Con)	Hartley Wilson (Con)
1911	Albert Edward Jacob (Lib)	William Parkfield Wethered (Con)	Hartley Wilson (Con)
1912	Henry Morley Miller (Con)	William Parkfield Wethered (Con)	Hartley Wilson (Con)
1913	Henry Morley Miller (Con)	William Parkfield Wethered (Con)	Hartley Wilson (Con)
1919	Henry Morley Miller (Con)	William Parkfield Wethered (Con)	Hartley Wilson (Con)
1920	Henry Morley Miller (Con)	Albert Edward Jacob (Lib)	Hartley Wilson (Con)
1921	Henry Morley Miller (Con)	Albert Edward Jacob (Lib)	John Ritchie (Con)
1922	Henry Morley Miller (Con)	Albert Edward Jacob (Lib)	John Ritchie (Con)
1923	Henry Morley Miller (Con)	Albert Edward Jacob (Lib)	John Ritchie (Con)
1924	Wilfred Bowring Stoddart (Con)	Albert Edward Jacob (Lib)	Edward James Deane (Con)
1925	Wilfred Bowring Stoddart (Con)	Albert Edward Jacob (Lib)	Edward James Deane (Con)
1926	Wilfred Bowring Stoddart (Con)	Alan Layfield (Con)	Edward James Deane (Con)
1927	Wilfred Bowring Stoddart (Con)	Alan Layfield (Con)	Edward James Deane (Con)
1928	Wilfred Bowring Stoddart (Con)	Alan Layfield (Con)	Edward James Deane (Con)
1929	Wilfred Bowring Stoddart (Con)	Frank Campbell Wilson (Con)	Edward James Deane (Con)
1930	Wilfred Bowring Stoddart (Con)	Frank Campbell Wilson (Con)	Edward James Deane (Con)
1931	Wilfred Bowring Stoddart (Con)	Frank Campbell Wilson (Con)	Edward James Deane (Con)
1932	Wilfred Bowring Stoddart (Con)	Vere Egerton Cotton (Con)	Edward James Deane (Con)
1933	Wilfred Bowring Stoddart (Con)	Vere Egerton Cotton (Con)	Edward James Deane (Con)
1934	Eric Errington (Con)	Vere Egerton Cotton (Con)	Edward James Deane (Con)
1935	Eric Errington (Con)	Vere Egerton Cotton (Con)	Edward James Deane (Con)
1936	Arthur Donald Dennis (Lib)	Vere Egerton Cotton (Con)	Edward James Deane (Con)
1936	John Richard Jones (Lib)	Vere Egerton Cotton (Con)	Edward James Deane (Con)
1937	William Edward Stirling Napier (Con)	Vere Egerton Cotton (Con)	Edward James Deane (Con)
1938	William Edward Stirling Napier (Con)	Vere Egerton Cotton (Con)	Edward James Deane (Con)
1939	William Edward Stirling Napier (Con)	Vere Egerton Cotton (Con)	Herbert Mylrea Allen (Con)
1945	William Edward Stirling Napier (Con)	Vere Egerton Cotton (Con)	Herbert Mylrea Allen (Con)
1946	Richard Martin Bingham (Con)	Vere Egerton Cotton (Con)	Herbert Mylrea Allen (Con)
1946	Richard Martin Bingham (Con)	William Latham Bateson (Con)	Herbert Mylrea Allen (Con)
1947	Richard Martin Bingham (Con)	William Latham Bateson (Con)	Herbert Mylrea Allen (Con)
1949	William Alexander Kinnear (Con)	William Latham Bateson (Con)	Herbert Mylrea Allen (Con)
1950	William Alexander Kinnear (Con)	Richard Meredith Alcock (Con)	Herbert Mylrea Allen (Con)
1951	William Alexander Kinnear (Con)	Richard Meredith Alcock (Con)	Herbert Mylrea Allen (Con)
1952	William Alexander Kinnear (Con)	Richard Meredith Alcock (Con)	Herbert Mylrea Allen (Con)
WARD REFORMED
1953	William Alexander Kinnear (Con)	G.S. Fulton (Con)	Herbert Mylrea Allen (Con)
1954	William Alexander Kinnear (Con)	G.S. Fulton (Con)	Herbert Mylrea Allen (Con)
1955	William Alexander Kinnear (Con)	G.S. Fulton (Con)	Herbert Mylrea Allen (Con)
1956	William Alexander Kinnear (Con)	G.S. Fulton (Con)	Herbert Mylrea Allen (Con)
1957	William Alexander Kinnear (Con)	J. Maxwell Entwistle (Con)	Herbert Mylrea Allen (Con)
1958	William Alexander Kinnear (Con)	J. Maxwell Entwistle (Con)	Herbert Mylrea Allen (Con)
1959	William Alexander Kinnear (Con)	J. Maxwell Entwistle (Con)	Herbert Mylrea Allen (Con)
1960	William Alexander Kinnear (Con)	J. Maxwell Entwistle (Con)	Herbert Mylrea Allen (Con)
1961	William Alexander Kinnear (Con)	S.A. Cotton (Con)	Herbert Mylrea Allen (Con)
1962	William Alexander Kinnear (Con)	S.A. Cotton (Con)	William N. Venmore (Con)
1963	William Alexander Kinnear (Con)	S.A. Cotton (Con)	William N. Venmore (Con)
1964	John E.R. Fischer (Con)	S.A. Cotton (Con)	William N. Venmore (Con)
1965	John E.R. Fischer (Con)	S.A. Cotton (Con)	William N. Venmore (Con)
1966	John E.R. Fischer (Con)	S.A. Cotton (Con)	William N. Venmore (Con)
1967	John E.R. Fischer (Con)	S.A. Cotton (Con)	William N. Venmore (Con)
1968	John E.R. Fischer (Con)	S.A. Cotton (Con)	William N. Venmore (Con)
1969	John E.R. Fischer (Con)	Sydney T. Moss (Con)	William N. Venmore (Con)
1970	John E.R. Fischer (Con)	Sydney T. Moss (Con)	William N. Venmore (Con)
1971	John E.R. Fischer (Con)	Sydney T. Moss (Con)	H.H. Francis (Con)
1972	John E.R. Fischer (Con)	Sydney T. Moss (Con)	H.H. Francis (Con)
WARD REFORMED
1973	Len Tyrer (Lib)	William R. Dyson (Lib)	Ian R. Porteous (Lib)
1975	J.H. Lea (Con)	William R. Dyson (Lib)	Ian R. Porteous (Lib)
1976	J.H. Lea (Con)	Sydney T. Moss (Con)	Ian R. Porteous (Lib)
1978	J.H. Lea (Con)	Sydney T. Moss (Con)	F. Fawcett (Lib)
1979	J.H. Lea (Con)	Sydney T. Moss (Con)	F. Fawcett (Con)
WARD REFORMED
1980	Peter Millea (Lib)	Trevor Jones (Lib)	Catherine Hancox (Lib)
1982	Peter Millea (Lib)	Trevor Jones (Lib)	Catherine Hancox (Lib)
1983	Peter Millea (Lib)	Trevor Jones (Lib)	Catherine Hancox (Lib)
1984	Peter Millea (Lib)	Trevor Jones (Lib)	Catherine Hancox (Lib)
1986	Douglas McKittrick (Lib)	Trevor Jones (Lib)	Catherine Hancox (Lib)
1987	Douglas McKittrick (Lib)	Trevor Jones (Lib)	Catherine Hancox (Lib)
1988	Douglas McKittrick (Lib)	Trevor Jones (Lib)	Catherine Hancox (Lib)
1990	Douglas McKittrick (LD)	Trevor Jones (Lib)	Catherine Hancox (Lib)
1991	Douglas McKittrick (LD)	Peter Allen (LD)	Catherine Hancox (Lib)
1992	Douglas McKittrick (LD)	Peter Allen (LD)	Catherine Hancox (LD)
1994	Ron Gould (LD)	Peter Allen (LD)	Catherine Hancox (LD)
1995	Ron Gould (LD)	J Thomson (LD)	Catherine Hancox (LD)
1996	Ron Gould (LD)	David Antrobus (LD)	Catherine Hancox (LD)
1998	Ron Gould (LD)	David Antrobus (LD)	Catherine Hancox (LD)
1999	Ron Gould (LD)	David Antrobus (LD)	Catherine Hancox (LD)
2000	Ron Gould (LD)	David Antrobus (LD)	Tina Gould (LD)
2002	Ron Gould (LD)	David Antrobus (LD)	Tina Gould (LD)
2003	Ron Gould (LD)	David Antrobus (LD)	Tina Gould (LD)
2004 - 2022 WARD DISESTABLISHED
2023	David Antrobus (LD)		
2026	Paul Ruddick (Grn)		

indicates seat up for re-election after boundary changes.

indicates seat up for re-election.

indicates change in affiliation.

indicates seat up for re-election after casual vacancy.

== Election results ==
=== Elections of the 2020s ===
12 March 2026 by-election
Party	Candidate	Votes	%	±%
Green	Paul Ruddick	782	45.0%	▲29.5
Liberal Democrats	Dave Thomas	637	36.7%	▼13.6
Labour	Jim Davies	177	10.2%	▼21.9
Reform	Harry Gallimore-King	121	7.0%	New
Independent	Craig Carden	12	0.7%	New
Conservative	Chris Hall	8	0.5%	▼1.8
Majority		145		
Registered electors				
Turnout			42.67%	
Rejected ballots		0		
Green gain from Liberal Democrats		Swing		

4 May 2023
Party	Candidate	Votes	%	±%
Liberal Democrats	Dave Antrobus	862	50.32	
Labour	Cate Murphy	546	31.87	
Green	Jean-Paul Roberts	266	15.53	
Conservative	David Michael John Jeffrey	39	2.28	
Majority		316	18.45	
Turnout		1,713	41.98	
Rejected ballots		13	0.75	
Total ballots		1,726	42.29	
Registered electors		4,081		
Liberal Democrats win (new seat)				

=== Elections of the 2000s ===
1 May 2003
Party	Candidate	Votes	%	±%
Liberal Democrats	David Antrobus	1,394	47.29	▼3.40
Labour	Barbara Murray	654	22.18	▼4.91
Liberal	Catherine Hancox	315	10.69	Steady
Green	Alexander Rudkin	239	8.11	▼0.13
Conservative	Michael Bunter	235	7.97	▼0.07
Socialist Alliance	Mark Henzel	111	3.77	Steady
Majority		740	25.10	▲1.51
Turnout		2,948		
Liberal Democrats hold		Swing	0.75	

2 May 2002
Party	Candidate	Votes	%	±%
Liberal Democrats	Ron Gould	1,766	50.69	▼5.57
Labour	Jack Johnson	944	27.10	▲6.79
Green	Alexander Rudkin	287	8.24	▼3.07
Conservative	Alma McGing	280	8.04	▼3.31
Independent	Cathy Hancox	207	5.94	Steady
Majority		822	23.59	▼12.36
Turnout		3,484		
Liberal Democrats hold		Swing	-6.18	

4 May 2000
Party	Candidate	Votes	%	±%
Liberal Democrats	Tina Gould	1,438	56.26	▼8.73
Labour	H. Adams	519	20.31	▼2.18
Conservative	Alma McGing	290	11.35	▲4.13
Green	H.J. Jago	289	11.31	▲6.00
Alliance for Student Rights	J. Cole	20	0.78	Steady
Majority		919	35.95	▼5.09
Turnout		2,556		
Liberal Democrats hold		Swing	-3.28	

=== Elections of the 1990s ===
6 May 1999
Party	Candidate	Votes	%	±%
Liberal Democrats	David Antrobus	2,107	64.99	▲1.63
Labour	H. Adams	729	49	▼4.70
Conservative	A. McGing	234	7.22	▼2.23
Green	R.C. Lentle	172	5.31	Steady
Majority		1,378	42.50	▲6.33
Turnout		3242		
Liberal Democrats hold		Swing	3.17	

7 May 1998
Party	Candidate	Votes	%	±%
Liberal Democrats	Ron Gould	1,757	63.36	▲9.21
Labour	J. Middleton	754	27.19	▼4.05
Conservative	Alma McGing	262	9.45	▲0.71
Majority		1,003	36.17	▲13.26
Turnout		2773		
Liberal Democrats hold		Swing	6.63	

2 May 1996 (2 seats)
Party	Candidate	Votes	%	±%
Liberal Democrats	Cathy Hancox	2,125	54.15	▲8.03
Liberal Democrats	Dave Antrobus	1,856		
Labour	J. Middleton	1,226	31.24	▼7.13
Labour	Joe Anderson	1,220		
Conservative	Alma McGing	343	8.74	▼2.16
Conservative	D. Patmore	315		
Green	R. Lentle	230	5.86	▲1.26
Majority		899	22.91	▼7.40
Turnout		3,924	29.09	
Liberal Democrats hold		Swing	7.58	

4 May 1995
Party	Candidate	Votes	%	±%
Liberal Democrats	J. Thomson	1,773	46.12	▼6.41
Labour	J. Middleton	1,475	38.37	▲5.78
Conservative	Alma McGing	419	10.90	▲1.79
Green	R. Lentle	177	4.60	▼1.17
Majority		298	7.75	▼12.19
Turnout		3,844		
Liberal Democrats hold		Swing	-6.09	

5 May 1994
Party	Candidate	Votes	%	±%
Liberal Democrats	Ron Gould	2,450	52.53	▼3.56
Labour	M. McDaid	1,520	32.59	▲9.69
Conservative	Alma McGing	425	9.11	▼8.72
Green	R. Lentle	269	5.77	▲3.18
Majority		930	19.94	▼13.25
Turnout		4,664		
Liberal Democrats hold		Swing	-6.63	

7 May 1992
Party	Candidate	Votes	%	±%
Liberal Democrats	Cathy Hancox	2,508	56.09	▲5.84
Labour	J. Middleton	1,024	22.90	▼3.73
Conservative	Elizabeth Furman	797	17.83	▲0.43
Green	Janifer Jones	142	3.18	▼1.68
Majority		1,484	33.19	▲9.57
Turnout		4,471		
Liberal Democrats hold		Swing	4.79	

2 May 1991
Party	Candidate	Votes	%	±%
Liberal Democrats	Peter Allen	2,553	50.25	▲3.95
Labour	B. Hardy	1,353	26.63	▼9.22
Conservative	N. Liddell	884	17.40	▲6.37
Green	J. Cook	247	4.86	▼1.96
SDP	D. Pollard	44	0.87	Steady
Majority		1,200	23.62	▲16.78
Turnout		5,081		
Liberal Democrats hold		Swing	6.58	

3 May 1990
Party	Candidate	Votes	%	±%
Liberal Democrats	Douglas McKittrick	2,778	46.30	▲3.56
Labour	R. Parkinson	2,151	35.85	▼0.05
Conservative	N.W. Liddell	662	11.03	▼5.63
Green	Joanne Cook	409	6.82	▲2.12
Majority		672	10.45	▲3.61
Turnout		6,000		
Liberal Democrats hold		Swing	1.81	

=== Elections of the 1980s ===
5 May 1988
Party	Candidate	Votes	%	±%
Liberal	Cathy Hancox	2,475	42.74	▼16.30
Labour	K. Taft	2,079	35.90	▲7.09
Conservative	N. Liddell	965	16.66	▲7.98
Green	Joanne Cook	272	4.70	▲1.24
Majority		396	6.84	▼23.39
Turnout		5,791		
Liberal hold		Swing	-11.70	

7 May 1987
Party	Candidate	Votes	%	±%
Liberal	Trevor Jones	4,074	59.04	▲3.05
Labour	K. F. Taft	1,988	28.81	▲3.13
Conservative	Olga Hughes	599	8.68	▼5.41
Green	Helen Prescott	239	3.46	Steady
Majority		2,086	30.23	▼0.08
Registered electors		13,487		
Turnout		6,900	51.16	
Liberal hold		Swing	-0.04	

8 May 1986
Party	Candidate	Votes	%	±%
Alliance	Douglas McKittrick	3,521	56.00	▲2.72
Labour	K. Taft	1,615	25.68	▼1.82
Conservative	J. Mass	886	14.09	▼5.13
	K. Prescott	266	4.23	Steady
Majority		1,906	30.31%	▲4.53
Turnout		6,288		
Alliance hold		Swing	▲2.27	

1 May 1984
Party	Candidate	Votes	%	±%
Liberal	Cathy Hancox	3,683	53.28%	▲7.54
Labour	J. D. Williams	1,901	27.50%	▼0.23
Conservative	J. Mass	1,329	19.22%	▼7.31
Majority		1,782	25.78%	▲7.77
Registered electors		13,502		
Turnout		6,913	51.20%	▲9.49
Liberal hold		Swing	3.89	

5 May 1983
Party	Candidate	Votes	%	±%
Liberal	Trevor Jones	2,624	45.74%	▼2.99
Labour	J. D. Williams	1,591	27.73%	▼2.47
Conservative	J. Mass	1,522	26.53%	▲5.47
Majority		1,033	18.01%	
Registered electors		13,755		
Turnout		5,737	41.71%	▲4.03
Liberal hold		Swing	-0.26	

6 May 1982
Party	Candidate	Votes	%	±%
Liberal	Peter Millea	2,462	48.73	▲4.40
Labour	J. Williams	1,526	30.21	▲13.79
Conservative	R. Jones	1,064	21.06	▼18.19
Majority		936	18.53	▲13.45
Registered electors		13,409		
Turnout		5,052	37.68	
Liberal hold		Swing	-4.69	

6 May 1980 3 seats
Party	Candidate	Votes	%	±%
Liberal	Catherine Hancox	2,271	44.33	▲20.71
Liberal	Trevor Jones	2,266		
Liberal	Peter Millea	2,054		
Conservative	Olga Yvonne Hughes	2,011	39.25	▼21.16
Conservative	Paul Davies Gill	1,950		
Conservative	John James Swainbank	1,926		
Labour	Frank Winstanley Longworth	841	16.42	▲0.45
Labour	Francis Stanley Roderick	771		
Labour	Francis Joseph Wiles	742		
Majority		260	5.08%	▼31.72
Registered electors		13,245		
Turnout			25.2%	
Liberal gain from Conservative		Swing	20.93	
Liberal gain from Conservative		Swing		
Liberal gain from Conservative		Swing		

=== Elections of the 1970s ===
3 May 1979
Party	Candidate	Votes	%	±%
Conservative	J. H. Lea	6,832	60.41	▼1.62
Liberal	Cathy Hancox	2,671	23.62	▼3.58
Labour	T. McManus	1,806	15.97	▲5.19
Majority		4,161	36.79	▲1.96
Registered electors		14,762		
Turnout		11,309	76.61	▲35.55
Conservative hold		Swing	0.98	

4 May 1978
Party	Candidate	Votes	%	±%
Conservative	F. Fawcett	3,775	62.03	▲9.50
Liberal	I. R. Porteous ^{(PARTY)}	1,655	27.19	▼10.15
Labour	F. Dunee	656	10.78	▲0.65
Majority		2,120	34.83	▲19.64
Registered electors		14,821		
Turnout		6,086	41.06	▼2.65
Conservative gain from Liberal		Swing	9.82	

6 May 1976
Party	Candidate	Votes	%	±%
Conservative	S. T. Moss	3,465	52.53	▲2.71
Liberal	W. R. Dyson ^{(PARTY)}	2,463	37.34	▼4.77
Labour	T. Roberts	668	10.13	▲2.06
Majority		1,002	15.19	▲7.48
Registered electors		15,090		
Turnout		6,596	43.71	▲1.68
Conservative gain from Liberal		Swing	3.74	

1 May 1975
Party	Candidate	Votes	%	±%
Conservative	J. H. Lea	3,037	49.82	▲13.03
Liberal	Len Tyrer	2,567	42.11	▼12.58
Labour	L. P. Gallagher	492	8.07	▼0.45
Majority		470	7.71	▼10.18
Registered electors		14,502		
Turnout		6,096	42.04	
Conservative gain from Liberal		Swing	12.80	

10 May 1973
Party	Candidate	Votes	%	±%
Liberal	Ian R. Porteous	3,472	54.69	
Liberal	Willam. R. Dyson	3,443		
Liberal	Len Tyrer	3,366		
Conservative	J. E. R. Fischer	2,336	36.79	▼43.82
Conservative	H. G. Francis	2,183		
Conservative	E. M. Clein ^{(PARTY)}	2,061		
Labour	K. M. Stewart	541	8.52	▼10.86
Labour	R. Fogg	411		
Majority		1,136	17.89	▼43.34
Registered electors				
Turnout		6,349		
Liberal gain from Conservative		Swing	49.25	
Liberal gain from Conservative		Swing		
Liberal gain from Conservative		Swing		

3 May 1972
Party	Candidate	Votes	%	±%
Conservative	S. T. Moss	3,639	80.62	▼3.17
Labour	R. Fogg	875	19.38	▼3.17
Majority		2,764	61.23	▲6.34
Registered electors		14,550		
Turnout		4,514	31.02	▼0.92
Conservative hold		Swing	3.17	

13 May 1971
Party	Candidate	Votes	%	±%
Conservative	H. H. Francis ^{(PARTY)}	3,633	77.45	▼6.57
Labour	G. Walsh	1,058	22.55	▲6.57
Majority		2,575	54.89	▼13.15
Registered electors		14,684		
Turnout		4,691	31.95	▼4.49
Conservative hold		Swing	-6.57	

7 May 1970
Party	Candidate	Votes	%	±%
Conservative	J. E. R. Fischer	4,522	84.02	▼7.81
Labour	G. T. Walsh	860	15.98	▲7.81
Majority		3,662	68.04	▼7.81
Registered electors		14,772		
Turnout		5,382	36.43	▲0.61
Conservative hold		Swing	-7.81	

=== Elections of the 1960s ===
8 May 1969
Party	Candidate	Votes	%	±%
Conservative	Sydney T. Moss ^{(PARTY)}	4,429	91.83	▲23.13
Labour	Andrew Williams	394	8.17	4.72
Majority		4,035	83.66	▼9.04
Registered electors		13,462		
Turnout		4,823	35.83	▼9.04
Conservative hold		Swing	9.21	

9 May 1968
Party	Candidate	Votes	%	±%
Conservative	William N. Venmore	4,142	68.70	▼10.23
Liberal	Alan G. Wilson	1,679	27.85	▲13.98
Labour	Vincent P. Hyams	208	3.45	▼3.75
Majority		2,463	40.85	▼24.20
Registered electors		13,437		
Turnout		6,029	44.87	▼2.58
Conservative hold		Swing		

11 May 1967
Party	Candidate	Votes	%	±%
Conservative	John E. R. Fischer	5,030	78.93	▲6.74
Liberal	Alan G. Wilson	884	13.87	▼6.23
Labour	Edwin C. Pimlett	459	7.20	▼0.52
Majority		4,146	65.06	▲12.97
Registered electors		13,430		
Turnout		6,373	47.45	▲11.22
Conservative hold		Swing	6.48	

12 May 1966
Party	Candidate	Votes	%	±%
Conservative	S. A. Cotton	3,599	72.18	▼7.37
Liberal	M. J. Mumford	1,002	20.10	▲8.38
Labour	G. Bradwell	385	7.72	▼1.01
Majority		2,597	52.09	▼15.75
Registered electors		13,762		
Turnout		4,986	36.23	▼2.37
Conservative hold		Swing	-7.87	

13 May 1965
Party	Candidate	Votes	%	±%
Conservative	W. N. Venmore	4,229	79.55	▲11.42
Labour	G. Bramwell	464	8.73	▼2.37
Liberal	J. S. Roddick	623	11.72	▼9.05
Majority		3,606	67.83	▲20.47
Registered electors		13,772		
Turnout		5,316	38.60	▲0.09
Conservative hold		Swing		

7 May 1964
Party	Candidate	Votes	%	±%
Conservative	J. E. R. Fischer ^{(PARTY)}	3,622	68.13	▲68.13
Liberal	Mrs. A. Dyson	1,104	20.77	▼6.71
Labour	S. J. Cook	590	11.10	▲3.45
Majority		2,518	47.37	▲9.97
Registered electors		13,805		
Turnout		5,316	38.51	▼2.95
Conservative hold		Swing	4.98	

9 May 1963
Party	Candidate	Votes	%	±%
Conservative	S. Cotton ^{(PARTY)}	3,655	64.87	▼22.54
Liberal	Mrs. A. Dyson	1,548	27.48	
Labour	T. Bailey	431	7.65	▼4.93
Majority		2,107	37.40	▼37.44
Registered electors		13,591		
Turnout		5,756	41.45	▲9.76
Conservative hold		Swing	-25.01	

10 May 1962
Party	Candidate	Votes	%	±%
Conservative	W. N. Venmore ^{(PARTY)}	3,821	87.42	▼4.96
Labour	S. J. Cook	550	12.58	▲4.96
Majority		3,271	74.83	▼9.91
Registered electors		13,792		
Turnout		4,371	31.69	▼3.60
Conservative hold		Swing	-4.96	

11 May 1961 2 seats
Party	Candidate	Votes	%	±%
Conservative	W. A. Kinear	4,494	92.37	▼0.32
Conservative	S. A. Cotton ^{(PARTY)}	4,368		
Labour	G. Ackers	371	7.63	+▲0.32
Labour	J. G. Morgan	354		
Majority		4,123	84.75	▼0.64
Registered electors		13,783		
Turnout		4,865	35.30	▲3.18
Conservative hold		Swing	-0.32	
Conservative hold		Swing		

12 May 1960
Party	Candidate	Votes	%	±%
Conservative	J. M. Entwistle	4,163	92.70	▲15.92
Labour	F. J. McConville	328	7.30	▲2.66
Majority		3,835	32.12	▼10.99
Registered electors		13,984		
Turnout		4,491	32.12	▼10.99
Conservative hold		Swing	6.63	

=== Elections of the 1950s ===
7 May 1959
Party	Candidate	Votes	%	±%
Conservative	H. M. Allen	4,612	76.78	▲4.28
Liberal	W. Russell Dyson	990	16.48	▼4.59
Labour	J. F. Stevens	279	4.64	▼1.79
Anti-Debt League	P. Cooney	126	2.10	
Majority		3,622	60.30	▲8.87
Registered electors		13,936		
Turnout		6,007	43.10	▲2.06
Conservative hold		Swing	4.44	

8 May 1958
Party	Candidate	Votes	%	±%
Conservative	W. A. Kinnear	4,156	72.49	▼16.88
Liberal	W. Russell Dyson	1,208	21.07	
Labour	J. H. Sommerville	369	6.44	▼4.19
Majority		2,948	51.42	▼27.32
Registered electors		13,969		
Turnout		5,733	41.04	▲3.06
Conservative hold		Swing	-18.98	

9 May 1957
Party	Candidate	Votes	%	±%
Conservative	J. Maxwell Entwistle ^{(PARTY)}	4,785	89.37	▼1.89
Labour	F. J. McConville	569	10.63	▲1.89
Majority		4,216	78.74	▼3.78
Registered electors		14,097		
Turnout		5,354	37.98	▲1.42
Conservative hold		Swing		

10 May 1956
Party	Candidate	Votes	%	±%
Conservative	H. M. Allen	4,700	91.26	▲3.6
Labour	Mrs. D. L. H. Taylor	450	8.74	▼3.60
Majority		4,250	82.52	▲7.21
Registered electors		14,088		
Turnout		5,150	36.56	▲7.17
Conservative hold		Swing		

12 May 1955
Party	Candidate	Votes	%	±%
Conservative	W. A. Kinnear	3,615	87.66	▼1.26
Labour	T. Higgins	509	12.34	▲1.26
Majority		3,106	75.32	▼2.51
Registered electors		14,033		
Turnout		4,124	29.39	▼11.17
Conservative hold		Swing	-1.26	

13 May 1954
Party	Candidate	Votes	%	±%
Conservative	G. S. Fulton	5,069	88.91	▼0.22
Labour	K. A. Holland	632	11.09	▲0.22
Majority		4,437	77.83	▼0.44
Registered electors		14,058		
Turnout		5,701	40.55	▼4.08
Conservative hold		Swing	-0.22	

7 May 1953 - 3 seats
Party	Candidate	Votes	%	±%
Conservative	H. M. Allen	5,578	89.13	▲12.96
Conservative	W. A. Kinnear	5,551		
Conservative	G. S. Fulton ^{(PARTY)}	5,437		
Labour	W. Rice-Jones	680	10.87	▼2.65
Labour	T. G. White	609		
Labour	R. Hunter	567		
Majority		4,898	78.27	▲15.62
Registered electors		14,022		
Turnout		6,258	44.63	▲0.08
Conservative hold		Swing		
Conservative hold		Swing		
Conservative hold		Swing		

8 May 1952
Party	Candidate	Votes	%	±%
Conservative	William Alexander Kinnear	5,268	76.17	▼7.20
Labour	Thomas George White	935	13.52	▲5.46
Liberal	John Bowen	713	10.31	▲1.75
Majority		4,333	62.65	▼12.16
Registered electors		15,523		
Turnout		6,916	44.55	▼0.34
Conservative hold		Swing		

11 May 1951
Party	Candidate	Votes	%	±%
Conservative	Herbert Mylrea Allen	5,842	833.37	▲2.21
Liberal	William Edward Oates	600	8.56	▼1.06
Labour	Roy Stoddart	565	8.06	▼1.16
Majority		5,267	44.90	▲3.27
Registered electors		15,607		
Turnout		7,007	44.90	▼1.35
Conservative hold		Swing		

11 May 1950
Party	Candidate	Votes	%	±%
Conservative	Richard Meredith Alcock	5,881	81.16	▲4.84
Liberal	William Edward Oates	697	9.62	▼2.80
Labour	Thomas George White	668	9.22	▼2.04
Majority		5,184	71.54	▲7.63
Registered electors		15,667		
Turnout		7,246	46.25	▼8.92
Conservative hold		Swing	3.82	

=== Elections of the 1940s ===
12 May 1949
Party	Candidate	Votes	%	±%
Conservative	William Alexander Kinnear ^{(PARTY)}	6,867	76.33	▼6.75
Liberal	William Edward Oates	1,117	12.42	
Labour	Terence Roberts	1,013	11.26	▼5.67
Majority		5,750	63.91	▼2.23
Registered electors		16,154		
Turnout		8,997	55.17	▼2.93
Conservative hold		Swing	-9.59	

1 November 1947
Party	Candidate	Votes	%	±%
Conservative	Herbert M. Allen'	7,871	83.07	
Labour	William Firman Aldis	1,604	16.93	
Majority		6,267	66.14	
Registered electors		16,307		
Turnout		9,475	58.10	

Vere Egerton Cotton (Conservative) was elected as an Alderman on 9 November 1946. A by-election was called for 28 November 1946.

28 November 1946
Party	Candidate	Votes	%	±%
Conservative	William Latham Bateson	unopposed		
Registered electors		16,530		

1 November 1946
Party	Candidate	Votes	%	±%
Conservative	Vere Egerton Cotton	5,778	82.23%	
Labour	Eric Barnes	1,249	17.77%	
Majority		4,529	64.45	
Registered electors		16,530		
Turnout		7,027	42.51	

By-election caused by the resignation of Councillor William Edward Stirling Napier.

16 May 1946
Party	Candidate	Votes	%	±%
	Richard Martin Bingham	5,036	73%	
	Victor Harold Edgar Baker	1,255	18%	
	Edmund Booth	619	9%	
Majority		3,781		
Registered electors		16,061		
Turnout		6,910	43%	

1 November 1945
Party	Candidate	Votes	%	±%
Conservative	Herbert Mylrea Allen	4,468	59.79	
Labour	John Francis Carr	1,505	20.14	
Liberal	Vera Catherine Davie	827	11.07	
Independent	Arthur Jas. Holland	673	9.01	
Majority		2,963	39.65	
Registered electors		16,061		
Turnout		7,473	46.53	

=== Elections of the 1930s ===
Councillor Edward James Deane (Conservative) was elected as an alderman on 9 November 1939. Herbert Mylrea Allen was appointed by the Council as Councillor for the Aigburth ward on 6 December 1939 under the Local Elections and Register of Electors (Temporary Provisions) Act 1939.

Appointment of Councillor 6 December 1939
Party	Former councillor	Appointed replacement	Term expires
Conservative	Councillor Edward James Deane	Herbert Mylrea Allen	19

1 November 1938
Party	Candidate	Votes	%	±%
Conservative	Vere Egerton Cotton O.B.E	unopposed		
Registered electors				
Conservative hold		Swing		

1 November 1937
Party	Candidate	Votes	%	±%
Conservative	William Edward Stirling Napier	3,121	59.20	▼0.78
Liberal	John Richard Jones	2,151	40.80	▲0.78
Majority		970	18.40	▼1.56
Registered electors		10,659		
Turnout		5,272	49.46%	▲5.03
Conservative gain from Liberal		Swing		

1 November 1936
Party	Candidate	Votes	%	±%
Conservative	Edward James Deane	2,777	59.98%	▲25.57
Liberal	Philip Binnes	1,853	40.02%	▼25.57
Majority		924	19.96	▼11.22
Registered electors		10,421		
Turnout		4,630	44.43%	▲7.96
Conservative hold		Swing	0	

Caused by the resignation of Councillor Arthur Donald Dennis (Liberal, elected at the by-election of 3 March 1936).

10 September 1936
Party	Candidate	Votes	%	±%
Liberal	John Richard Jones	unopposed		
Registered electors		10,095		
Liberal hold		Swing		

The term of office to end on 1 November 1937.

Caused by the resignation of Councillor Eric Errington (Conservative).

3 March 1936
Party	Candidate	Votes	%	±%
Liberal	Arthur Donald Dennis	2,415	65.59%	▲25.85
Conservative	Harold Diedrick Arrowsmith	1,267	34.41%	▼25.85
Majority		1,148	31.18	▲10.66
Registered electors		10,095		
Turnout		3,682	36.47%	▼7.89
Liberal gain from Conservative		Swing		

The term of office to end on 1 November 1937.

1 November 1935
Party	Candidate	Votes	%	±%
Conservative	Vere Egerton Cotton OBE	2,699	60.26%	▲1.73
Liberal	Arthur Donald Dennis	1,780	39.74%	▼1.73
Majority		919	20.52	▲3.47
Registered electors		10,095		
Turnout		4,479	44.37%	▲8.95
Conservative hold		Swing		

1 November 1934
Party	Candidate	Votes	%	±%
Conservative	Eric Errington	2,001	58.53%	▼4.11
Liberal	Arthur Donald Dennis	1,418	41.47%	▲4.11
Majority		583	17.05	▼8.21
Registered electors		9,653		
Turnout		3,419	35.42%	▼1.72
Conservative hold		Swing		

1 November 1933
Party	Candidate	Votes	%	±%
Conservative	Edward James Deane	2,132	62.63%	▲2.21
Liberal	Arthur Donald Dennis	1,272	37.37▼2.21%	
Majority		860	25.26	▲1.55
Registered electors		9,165		
Turnout		3,404	37.14%	▲0.10
Conservative hold		Swing		

1 November 1932
Party	Candidate	Votes	%	±%
Conservative	Vere Egerton Cotton OBE	1,974	60.42%	
Liberal	Arthur Donald Dennis	1,293	39.58%	
Majority		681	20.84	
Registered electors		8,819		
Turnout		3,267	37.05%	
Conservative hold		Swing		

1 November 1931
Party	Candidate	Votes	%	±%
Conservative	Wilfred Bowring Stoddart	unopposed		
Registered electors		4,379		
Conservative hold		Swing		

1 November 1930
Party	Candidate	Votes	%	±%
Conservative	Edward James Deane	2,743	82.50%	▲13.53
Labour	William Edward Lloyd	582	17.50%	▼13.53
Majority		2,161	64.99	▲27.06
Registered electors		8,137		
Turnout		3,325	40.86%	▼8.02
Conservative hold		Swing	0	

=== Elections of the 1920s ===
1 November 1929
Party	Candidate	Votes	%	±%
Conservative	Frank Campbell Wilson	2,549	68.97	
Labour	James Henry Howard	1,147	31.03	
Majority		1,402	37.93	
Registered electors		7,561		
Turnout		3,696	4.88	
Conservative hold		Swing		

1 November 1928
Party	Candidate	Votes	%	±%
Conservative	Wilfred Bowring Stoddart	unopposed		
Registered electors				
Conservative hold		Swing		

1 November 1927
Party	Candidate	Votes	%	±%
Conservative	Edward James Deane	unopposed		
Registered electors				
Conservative hold		Swing		

1 November 1926
Party	Candidate	Votes	%	±%
Conservative	Alan Layfield	unopposed		
Registered electors		5,831		
Conservative gain from Liberal		Swing		

1 November 1925
Party	Candidate	Votes	%	±%
Conservative	Wilfred Bowring Stoddart	unopposed		
Registered electors		5,507		
Conservative hold		Swing		

By-election caused by the election as an alderman of Councillor Henry Morley Miller (Conservative) on 10 November 1924.

28 November 1924
Party	Candidate	Votes	%	±%
Conservative	Wilfrid Bowring Stoddart	unopposed		
Registered electors				
Conservative hold		Swing		

Term of office to expire on 1 November 1925

1 November 1924
Party	Candidate	Votes	%	±%
Conservative	Edward James Deane	unopposed		
Registered electors				
Conservative hold		Swing		

1 November 1923
Party	Candidate	Votes	%	±%
Liberal	Albert Edward Jacob	unopposed		
Registered electors				
Liberal hold		Swing		

1 November 1922
Party	Candidate	Votes	%	±%
Conservative	Henry Morley Miller	unopposed		
Registered electors				
Conservative hold		Swing		

1 November 1921
Party	Candidate	Votes	%	±%
Conservative	John Ritchie	1,955	66.75%	
Middle Class Union	William James Austin	974	33.25%	
Majority		981	33.49	
Registered electors		4,612		
Turnout		2,929	63.51%	
Conservative hold		Swing		

1 November 1920
Party	Candidate	Votes	%	±%
Liberal	Albert Edward Jacob	unopposed		
Registered electors				
Liberal hold		Swing		

=== Elections of the 1910s ===
1 November 1919
Party	Candidate	Votes	%	±%
Conservative	Henry Morley Miller	unopposed		
Registered electors				
Conservative hold		Swing		

1 November 1913
Party	Candidate	Votes	%	±%
Conservative	William Parkfield Wethered	unopposed		
Registered electors				
Conservative hold		Swing		

1 November 1912
Party	Candidate	Votes	%	±%
Conservative	Henry Morley Miller	unopposed		
Registered electors				
Conservative gain from Liberal		Swing		

1 November 1911
Party	Candidate	Votes	%	±%
Conservative	Hartley Wilson	unopposed		
Registered electors				
Conservative hold		Swing		

1 November 1910
Party	Candidate	Votes	%	±%
Conservative	William Parkfield Wethered	704	54.36%	▲12.73
Liberal	William Abercromby	591	45.64%	▼12.73
Majority		113	8.73	▼8.02
Registered electors		1,754		
Turnout		1,295	73.83%	
Conservative hold		Swing		

=== Elections of the 1900s ===
1 November 1909
Party	Candidate	Votes	%	±%
Liberal	Albert Edward Jacob	760	58.37%	
Conservative	David Jackson	542	41.63%	
Majority		218	16.74	
Registered electors		1,691		
Turnout		1,302	77%	
Liberal hold		Swing		

1 November 1908
Party	Candidate	Votes	%	±%
Conservative	Hartley Wilson	unopposed		
Registered electors				
Conservative hold		Swing		

1 November 1907
Party	Candidate	Votes	%	±%
Conservative	William Parkfield Wethered	696	64.15%	▲15.95
Liberal	Archibald Bathgate	389	35.85%	▼15.95
Majority		307	28.29	▲24.68
Registered electors		1,450		
Turnout		1,085	75%	
Conservative gain from Liberal		Swing	0	

1 November 1906
Party	Candidate	Votes	%	±%
Liberal	Albert Edward Jacob	559	81.81%	▼1.97
Conservative	William Parkfield Wethered	520	48.19%	▲1.97
Majority		39	3.61	▲3.29
Registered electors		1,450		
Turnout		1,079		
Liberal gain from Conservative		Swing		

1 November 1905
Party	Candidate	Votes	%	±%
Conservative	Hartley Wilson	469	49.84%	Steady
Liberal	Albert Edward Jacob	466	49.84%	Steady
Majority		3	0.32	
Registered electors		1,319		
Turnout		935	71%	
Conservative hold		Swing		

1 November 1904
Party	Candidate	Votes	%	±%
Liberal	Archibald Bathgate	unopposed		
Registered electors				
Liberal hold		Swing		

2 November 1903
Party	Candidate	Votes	%	±%
Conservative	John Salmon	unopposed		
Registered electors				
Conservative hold		Swing		

1 November 1902 - 3 seats
Party	Candidate	Votes	%	±%
Liberal	Archibald Bathgate	unopposed		
Conservative	William Hall Jowett	unopposed		
Conservative	Arthur Twiss Kemble	unopposed		
Registered electors				
Liberal win (new seat)				
Conservative win (new seat)				
Conservative win (new seat)				
