= Broadgreen (Liverpool ward) =

Electoral division in England

Coordinates: 53°24′49.1″N 2°54′14.8″W

- Broadgreen ward (2023) within Liverpool
- Population: 4,510 (2023 electorate)
- Metropolitan borough: City of Liverpool
- Metropolitan county: Merseyside
- Region: North West
- Country: England
- Sovereign state: United Kingdom
- UK Parliament: Liverpool West Derby
- Councillors: Nick Crofts (Labour)

Broadgreen ward is an electoral district of Liverpool City Council. It was created in 1953. Its boundaries were changed for the 1973 and 1980 elections. The ward was dissolved prior to the 2004 Liverpool City Council election and distributed into the new Knotty Ash ward, and small parts of the Old Swan and Yew Tree wards.

The 2022 review by the Local Government Boundary Commission for England decided that the existing 30 wards each represented by three Councillors should be replaced by 64 wards represented by 85 councillors with varying representation by one, two or three councillors per ward. The Broadgreen ward was recreated as a smaller, single-member ward from a section of the previous Knotty Ash and Old Swan wards. The new ward is roughly bounded by Edge Lane Drive, Bowring Park Road, the North Liverpool Extension Line, Alder Road, Queens Drive, Cunningham Road, and Oakhill Road.

== Background ==
The following maps show the boundary changes to the ward from 1953 to 1980, compared to its re-constitution in 2023.

Broadgreen ward, 1953

Broadgreen ward, 1973

Broadgreen ward, 1980

current ward (2023)

== Councillors ==
Election	Councillor	Councillor	Councillor
1980 WARD REFORMED
1980	Geoffrey Smith (Lib)	James Joyce (Lib)	Rosie Cooper (Lib)
1982	Geoffrey Smith (Lib)	James Joyce (Lib)	Rosie Cooper (Lib)
1983	Geoffrey Smith (Lib)	J.L. Dillon (Lab)	Rosie Cooper (Lib)
1984	Geoffrey Smith (Lib)	J.L. Dillon (Lab)	Rosie Cooper (Lib)
1986	Geoffrey Smith (Lib)	J.L. Dillon (Lab)	Rosie Cooper (Lib)
1987	Geoffrey Smith (Lib)	Chris Curry (Lib)	Rosie Cooper (Lib)
1988	Geoffrey Smith (SLD)	Chris Curry (SLD)	Rosie Cooper (SLD)
1990	Tony Concepcion (Lab)	Chris Curry (LD)	Rosie Cooper (LD)
1991	Tony Concepcion (Lab)	Chris Curry (LD)	Rosie Cooper (LD)
1992	Tony Concepcion (Lab)	Chris Curry (LD)	Rosie Cooper (LD)
1994	Tony Concepcion (Lab)	Chris Curry (LD)	Rosie Cooper (LD)
1995	Tony Concepcion (Lab)	Chris Newby (Lab)	Rosie Cooper (LD)
1996	Tony Concepcion (Lab)	Chris Newby (Lab)	M. McDaid (Lab)
1998	David Irving (LD)	Chris Newby (LD)	M. McDaid (Lab)
1999	David Irving (LD)	Chris Newby (LD)	M. McDaid (Lab)
2000	David Irving (LD)	Chris Newby (LD)	Josie Mullen (LD)
2002	David Irving (LD)	Chris Newby (LD)	Josie Mullen (LD)
2003	David Irving (LD)	Chris Newby (LD)	Josie Mullen (LD)
2004-2022 WARD DISESTABLISHED
2023	Nick Crofts (Lab)		

indicates seat up for re-election after boundary changes.

indicates seat up for re-election.

indicates change in affiliation.

indicates seat up for re-election after casual vacancy.

== Election results ==
=== Elections of the 2020s ===
==== 2023 ====
Thursday, 4th May 2023
Party	Candidate	Votes	%	±%
Labour Co-op	Nick Crofts^{§}	883	56.89	
Liberal Democrats	Josie Mullen	482	31.06	
Green	Andrew Philip Dimelow	100	6.44	
Independent	Barry Joseph Farmer	87	5.61	
Majority		401	25.83	
Turnout		1,552	34.41	
Rejected ballots		7	0.45	
Total ballots		1,559	34.57	
Registered electors		4,510		
Labour win (new seat)				

^{§}Nick Crofts was a re-standing councillor for the Knotty Ash ward.

=== Elections of the 2000s ===
1 May 2003
Party	Candidate	Votes	%	±%
Liberal Democrats	Christopher Newby	1,244	54.87	▼5.29
Labour	Peter Davidson	796	35.11	▲4.96
Socialist Alliance	John Ralph	79	3.48	▲0.28
Conservative	Keith Sutton	77	3.40	▲0.80
Liberal	Deborah Tilston	71	3.13	▼0.75
Majority		448	19.76	▼10.25
Turnout		2,267	19.8	
Liberal Democrats hold		Swing	-5.12	

2 May 2002
Party	Candidate	Votes	%	±%
Liberal Democrats	David Irving	1,690	60.16	▼1.58
Labour	Anthony Murphy	847	30.15	▼0.86
Liberal	Maria Langley	109	3.88	▲0.28
Socialist Alliance	John Ralph	90	3.20	n/a
Conservative	Keith Sutton	73	2.60	▼1.04
Majority		843	30.01	▼0.71
Turnout		2,809		
Liberal Democrats hold		Swing	-0.36	

4 May 2000
Party	Candidate	Votes	%	±%
Liberal Democrats	Josie Mullen	1,475	61.74	▲4.44
Labour	M. McDaid	741	31.02	▼3.48
Liberal	C. Paton	86	3.60	▼2.08
Conservative	Keith Sutton	87	3.64	▲1.12
Majority		734	30.72	▲7.91
Turnout		2,389	20	
Liberal Democrats gain from Labour		Swing	3.96	

=== Elections of the 1990s ===
6 May 1999
Party	Candidate	Votes	%	±%
Liberal Democrats	Chris Newby	1,593	57.30	▼9.55
Labour	G. Dunphy	959	34.50	▲6.42
Liberal	J. Garner	158	5.68	▲0.61
Conservative	K. Sutton	70	2.52	n/a
Majority		634	22.81	▼15.98
Turnout		2,780		
Liberal Democrats gain from Labour		Swing	-7.99	

7 May 1998
Party	Candidate	Votes	%	±%
Liberal Democrats	Dave Irving	2,029	66.85	▲31.84
Labour	Tony Concepcion	852	28.07	▼25.22
Liberal	J. Newall	154	5.07	▼0.75
Majority		1,177	38.78	▲20.51
Turnout		3,035		
Liberal Democrats gain from Labour		Swing	28.53	

2 May 1996
Party	Candidate	Votes	%	±%
Labour	M. McDaid	1,776	53.29	▲2.44
Liberal Democrats	J. McCabe	1,167	35.01	▼6.73
Liberal	T. Mills	196	5.82	▲2.43
Conservative	K. Sutton	194	5.82	▲2.43
Majority		609	18.27	▲9.18
Turnout		3,333		
Labour gain from Liberal Democrats		Swing	4.59	

4th May 1995
Party	Candidate	Votes	%	±%
Labour	Chris Newby	1,996	50.84	▲1.02
Liberal Democrats	Chris Curry	1,639	41.75	▼1.71
Conservative	R. Bethell	133	3.39	▼0.81
Liberal	C. Serjeant	158	4.02	
Majority		357	9.09	▲2.73
Turnout		3,926		
Labour gain from Liberal Democrats		Swing	1.37	

5th May 1994
Party	Candidate	Votes	%	±%
Labour	Tony Concepcion	2,349	49.82	▲23.95
Liberal Democrats	K. MacDonald	2,049	43.46	▼18.03
Conservative	I. MacFall	198	4.20	▼1.39
Ward Independent Labour	J. Mooney	119	2.52	▼4.53
Majority		300	6.36	▼29.26
Turnout		4,715		
Labour hold		Swing	20.99	

7th May 1992
Party	Candidate	Votes	%	±%
Liberal Democrats	Rosie Cooper	2,660	61.49	▲12.37
Labour	Dave Minahan	1,119	25.87	▼12.64
Conservative	N. Hastings	242	5.59	▼3.83
Broadgreen Labour	F. Gillard	305	7.05	
Majority		1,541	35.62	▲25.01
Turnout		4,326	35.62	▲25.01
Liberal Democrats hold		Swing	12.51	

2 May 1991
Party	Candidate	Votes	%	±%
Liberal Democrats	Chris Curry	2,606	49.11	▲10.29
Labour	Dave Minahan	2,043	38.50	▼15.26
Conservative	J. Brandwood	500	9.42	▲4.65
Green	S. Nath	109	2.05	▼0.58
SDP	M. Mason	48	0.90	
Majority		563	10.61	▼4.34
Turnout		5,306		
Liberal Democrats hold		Swing	12.78	

3rd May 1990
Party	Candidate	Votes	%	±%
Labour	Tony Concepcion	3,489	53.77	▲11.36
Liberal Democrats	G. B. Smith	2,519	38.82	▼11.91
Conservative	M. Lind	310	4.78	▼0.35
Green	B. Turner	171	2.64	▲1.64
Majority		970	14.95	▲6.63
Turnout		6,489		
Labour gain from Liberal Democrats		Swing	11.63	

=== Elections of the 1980s ===
5th May 1988
Party	Candidate	Votes	%	±%
SLD	Rosie Cooper	3,109	50.73	▲0.38
Labour	F. Gillard	2,599	42.40	▼0.17
Conservative	J. Baldwin	314	5.12	▼1.95
Green	Nina Morgan	61	1.00	
SDP	R. Nolan	46	0.75	
Majority		510	8.32	▲0.55
Turnout		6,129		
SLD hold		Swing	0.28	

7th May 1987
Party	Candidate	Votes	%	±%
Liberal	Chris Curry	3,500	50.35	▼2.57
Labour	G. M. Casey	2,960	42.58	▲3.85
Conservative	G. Powell	492	7.08	▼1.28
Majority		540	7.77	▼6.43
Turnout		6,952	52.38	
Registered electors		13,271		
Liberal gain from Labour		Swing	-3.21	

8th May 1986
Party	Candidate	Votes	%	±%
Alliance	Geoffrey Smith	3,337	52.92	▲4.56
Labour	Alan Dean	2,442	38.73	▼2.47
Conservative	M. Kingston	527	8.36	▼2.09
Majority		895	14.19	▲7.04
Turnout		6,306		
Liberal hold		Swing	3.52	

3rd May 1984
Party	Candidate	Votes	%	±%
Liberal	Rosemary Cooper	3,500	48.36	▲12.68
Labour	R. Quinn	2,982	41.20	▼2.58
Conservative	S. Fitzsimmons	756	10.44	▼10.09
Majority		518	7.16	▼0.95
Turnout		7,238	53.49	▲9.84
Registered electors		13,532		
Liberal hold		Swing	7.63	

5th May 1983
Party	Candidate	Votes	%	±%
Labour	J. L. Dillon	2,599	43.78	▲11.12
Liberal	I. Ilkin	2,118	35.68	▼6.91
Conservative	S. Fitzsimmons	1,219	20.54	▼4.21
Majority		481	8.10	▼1.82
Turnout		5,936	43.65	▲7.82
Registered electors		13,599		
Labour gain from Liberal		Swing	9.02	

6th May 1982
Party	Candidate	Votes	%	±%
Liberal	Geoffrey Smith	2,072	42.59	▲1.17
Labour	E. J. Smith	1,589	32.66	▲3.63
Conservative	S. Fitzsimmons	1,204	24.75	▼4.80
Majority		483	9.93	▼1.94
Turnout		4,865	35.83	▼0.61
Registered electors		13,578		
Liberal hold		Swing		

1st May 1980 - 3 seats
Party	Candidate	Votes	%	±%
Liberal	Rosemary Cooper	2,066	41.42	
Liberal	James Joyce	1,847		
Liberal	Geoffrey Smith	1,766		
Conservative	Frederick Christopher Burgess	1,474	29.03	
Labour	David James Minahan	1,448	29.55	
Labour	Barbara Lucile Walsh	1,469		
Labour	John Vincent Walsh	1,427		
Conservative	Charles James Lister	1,416		
Conservative	Richard Donald Oughton	1,395		
Majority		592	11.87	
Turnout		4,988	36.44	
Registered electors		13,668		
Liberal win (new seat)				
Liberal win (new seat)				
Liberal win (new seat)				
