= 1991 Liverpool City Council election =

1991 UK local government election

← 1990	2 May 1991	1992 →

33 seats were up for election (one third): one seat for each of the 33 wards 50 seats needed for a majority

Elections to Liverpool City Council were held on 2 May 1991. One third of the council was up for election and the Labour Party kept overall control of the council.

After the election, the composition of the council was:

Party	Seats	±
Labour	62	??
Liberal Democrat	27	-1
Militant Labour	5	??
Social Democrats	1	??
Liberal Party	0	??
Independent	??	??
Others	2	??

== Election results ==
Liverpool local election result 1991
Party	Seats	Gains	Losses	Net gain/loss	Seats %	Votes %	Votes	+/−
Liberal Democrats	13				39%	38%	54,751	
Labour	13				39%	36%	50,905	
Militant Labour	6			5	15%	8%	11,097	
SDP	1			1	3%	3%	3,747	
Liberal	0			0	0%	3%	3,869	
Conservative	0			0	0%	11%	15,482	
Green	0			0	0%	2%	3,267	
Others	0			0	0%	0.03%	49	

== Ward results ==
=== Abercromby ===
Abercromby
Party	Candidate	Votes	%	±%
Labour	N. Stanley	1,526	77%	▲6%
Liberal Democrats	Nigel Dyer	289	15%	▼4%
Conservative	C. Zsigmond	155	8%	▲3%
Majority		1,237		
Registered electors				
Turnout		1,970		
Labour hold		Swing	▲6%	

=== Aigburth ===
Aigburth
Party	Candidate	Votes	%	±%
Liberal Democrats	Peter Allen	2,553	50%	
Labour	B. Hardy	1,353	27%	
Conservative	N. Liddell	884	17%	
Green	J. Cook	247	5%	
SDP	D. Pollard	44	1%	
Majority		1,200		
Turnout		5,081		

=== Allerton ===
Allerton
Party	Candidate	Votes	%	±%
Liberal Democrats	Vera Best	2,749	47%	
Conservative	S. North	1,179	20%	
Labour	G. Martin	1,559	27%	
Green	R. Cantwell	179	3%	
SDP	Ron Gould	153	3%	
Majority		1,190		
Turnout		5,819		

=== Anfield ===
Anfield
Party	Candidate	Votes	%	±%
Anfield Labour	J. Smith	1,624	30%	
Liberal Democrats	J. Cunningham	1,357	25%	
Labour	M. Tottey	1,232	23%	
Conservative	M. Fitzsimmons	566	11%	
Liberal	T. Newall	608	11%	
Majority		267		
Turnout		5,387		

=== Arundel ===
Arundel
Party	Candidate	Votes	%	±%
Liberal Democrats	Roger Johnston	1,812	46%	
Labour	P. Tyrrell	1,294	33%	
Conservative	A. Zsigmond	286	7%	
Green	W. Jenkins	438	11%	
Lurch the Thinking Woman's crumpet	S. Maidment	49	1%	
SDP	V. Gould	40	1%	
Majority		518		
Turnout		3,919		

=== Breckfield ===
Breckfield
Party	Candidate	Votes	%	±%
Labour	Alan Dean	2,081	66%	
Liberal Democrats	C. Cartmel	757	24%	
Conservative	E. Bayley	333	11%	
Majority		1,324		
Turnout		3,171		

=== Broadgreen ===
Broadgreen
Party	Candidate	Votes	%	±%
Liberal Democrats	Chris Curry	2,606	49%	
Labour	D. Minahan	2,043	39%	
Conservative	J. Brandwood	500	9%	
Green	S. Nath	109	2%	
SDP	M. Mason	48	1%	
Majority		563		
Turnout		5,306		

=== Childwall ===
Childwall
Party	Candidate	Votes	%	±%
Liberal Democrats	Neville Chin	3,926	61%	
Conservative	M. Kingston	1,116	17%	
Labour	R. Griffiths	1,112	17%	
Green	A. Willan	255	4%	
Majority		2,814		
Turnout		6,409		

=== Church ===
Church
Party	Candidate	Votes	%	±%
Liberal Democrats	W. Roberts	4,277	64%	
Labour	A. Joel	1,130	17%	
Conservative	I. Bishop	979	15%	
Green	?	290	4%	
Majority		3,147		
Turnout		6,676		

=== Clubmoor ===
Clubmoor
Party	Candidate	Votes	%	±%
Clubmoor Labour	M. Richardson	2,462	51%	
Liberal	B. Jackson	1,581	33%	
Liberal Democrats	H. Owen	322	7%	
Conservative	D. Smith	309	6%	
Green	J. Best	129	3%	
Majority		881		
Turnout		4,803		

=== County ===
County
Party	Candidate	Votes	%	±%
Liberal Democrats	M. Fielding	3,548	62%	
Labour	P. Banks	2,050	36%	
Conservative	J. Atkinson	137	2%	
SDP	H. Gibson	31	1%	
Majority		1,498		
Turnout		5,766		

=== Croxteth ===
Croxteth
Party	Candidate	Votes	%	±%
Liberal Democrats	Norman Mills	3,471	55%	
Labour	S. Balmer	1,591	25%	
Conservative	G. Brandwood	985	16%	
SDP	M. Killen	117	2%	
Green	I. Graham	172	3%	
Majority		1,880		
Turnout		6,336		

=== Dingle ===
Dingle
Party	Candidate	Votes	%	±%
Dingle Labour	F. Hegarty	1,548	33%	
Labour	E. Shields	1,459	31%	
Liberal Democrats	J. Dakin	1,274	27%	
Conservative	D. Patmore	295	6%	
Green	R. Spalding	171	4%	
Majority		89		
Turnout		4,747		

=== Dovecot ===
Dovecot
Party	Candidate	Votes	%	±%
Labour	R. Quinn	1,989	63%	
Liberal Democrats	S. Woodward	827	26%	
Conservative	W. Connolly	342	11%	
Majority		1,162		
Turnout		3,158		

=== Everton ===
Everton
Party	Candidate	Votes	%	±%
Everton Labour	M.McCauly	964	50%	
Labour	P. Davies	836	44%	
Liberal Democrats	J. Thomson	119	6%	
Majority		128		
Turnout		1,919		

=== Fazakerley ===
Fazakerley
Party	Candidate	Votes	%	±%
Labour	Jack Spriggs	2,459	62%	
Liberal Democrats	J. Johnson	989	25%	
Conservative	G. Breckell	497	13%	
Majority		1,470		
Turnout		3,945		

=== Gillmoss ===
Gillmoss
Party	Candidate	Votes	%	±%
Gillmoss Labour	M. Alderson	2,127	49%	
Labour	E. Roderick	1,207	28%	
Liberal Democrats	George Mann	633	14%	
Conservative	A. Bowness	299	7%	
Green	S. Ellison	116	3%	
Majority		920		
Turnout		4,382		

=== Granby ===
Granby
Party	Candidate	Votes	%	±%
Labour	P. Lashley	1,598	65%	
Liberal Democrats	H. Priddie	435	18%	
Conservative	P. Edwards	199	8%	
Green	R. Morris	211	9%	
Majority		1,163		
Turnout		2,443		

=== Grassendale ===
Grassendale
Party	Candidate	Votes	%	±%
Liberal Democrats	Gerry Scott	3,915	67%	
Labour	F. Nelson	763	13%	
Conservative	A. Ogden	1,055	18%	
Green	A. Krisna-Das	149	3%	
Majority		3,152		
Turnout		5,882		

=== Kensington ===
Kensington
Party	Candidate	Votes	%	±%
Liberal Democrats	Frank Doran	2,872	64%	
Labour	J. Bowers	1,473	33%	
Conservative	R. Bethell	109	2%	
SDP	J. Reece	23	1%	
Majority		1,399		
Turnout		4,477		

=== Melrose ===
Melrose
Party	Candidate	Votes	%	±%
Labour	G. Booth	2,713	72%	
Liberal Democrats	C. Mayes	781	21%	
Conservative	A. Nugent	275	7%	
Majority		1,932		
Turnout		3,769		

=== Netherley ===
Netherley
Party	Candidate	Votes	%	±%
Netherley Labour	M. Bolland	1,199	43%	
Labour	B. Navarro	1,014	36%	
Liberal Democrats	J. Clein	380	14%	
Conservative	W. Dobinson	125	4%	
Green	M. Fowler	75	3%	
Majority		185		
Turnout		2,793		

=== Old Swan ===
Old Swan
Party	Candidate	Votes	%	±%
Labour	L. Hughes	1,827	36%	
Liberal Democrats	J. Berman	1,553	37%	
Conservative	M. Lind	616	15%	
Green	I. Gilmour	160	4%	
Majority		274		
Turnout		4,156		

=== Picton ===
Picton
Party	Candidate	Votes	%	±%
Liberal Democrats	P. McGrath	2,973	59%	
Labour	D. Dunphy	1,648	33%	
Green	J. Hulton	192	4%	
Conservative	M. Williams	148	3%	
SDP	L. Devereux	53	1%	
Majority		1,325		
Turnout		5,014		

=== Pirrie ===
Pirrie
Party	Candidate	Votes	%	±%
Labour	B. Owen	2,510	68%	
Liberal Democrats	A. Hulme	836	23%	
Conservative	P. Aldcroft	350	9%	
Majority		1,674		
Turnout		3,696		

=== St. Mary's ===
St. Mary's
Party	Candidate	Votes	%	±%
Labour	K. Coyne	2,323	51%	
Liberal Democrats	C. Hutchinson	1,842	40%	
Conservative	G. Harden	308	7%	
Green	L. Williams	126	3%	
Majority		481		
Turnout		4,599		

=== Smithdown ===
Smithdown
Party	Candidate	Votes	%	±%
Labour	M. Clarke	1,661	60%	
Liberal Democrats	W. Barrow	965	35%	
Conservative	D. O'Leary	134	5%	
Majority		696		
Turnout		2,760		

=== Speke ===
Speke
Party	Candidate	Votes	%	±%
Labour	P. Coventry	1,775	79%	
Conservative	C. Harpin	484	21%	
Majority		1,775		
Turnout		2,259		

=== Tuebrook ===
Tuebrook
Party	Candidate	Votes	%	±%
Liberal Democrats	Neil Cardwell	1,870	37%	
Liberal	Hazel Williams	1,680	33%	
Labour	T. McManus	1,188	24%	
Conservative	E. Rodick	155	3%	
Green	J. Jones	137	3%	
Majority		682		
Turnout		5,030		

=== Valley ===
Valley
Party	Candidate	Votes	%	±%
Labour	E. Devaney	1,222	35%	
Valley Labour	M. Burke	1,173	34%	
Liberal Democrats	Ian Phillips	776	22%	
Conservative	S. Lever	291	8%	
Majority		446		
Turnout		3,462		

=== Vauxhall ===
Vauxhall
Party	Candidate	Votes	%	±%
Labour	J. Livingston	1,701	89%	
Liberal Democrats	B.Grocott	128	7%	
Conservative	P. Edwards	75	4%	
Majority		1,573		
Turnout		1,904		

=== Warbreck ===
Warbreck
Party	Candidate	Votes	%	±%
Liberal Democrats	J. Lang	3,483	60%	
Labour	J. Humphries	1,956	34%	
Conservative	D. Gray	318	5%	
SDP	L. Hannacott	45	1%	
Majority		1,527		
Turnout		5,802		

=== Woolton ===
Woolton
Party	Candidate	Votes	%	±%
SDP	P. McKibbin	3,193	50%	
Conservative	J. Mass	1,978	31%	
Labour	I. Harvey	612	10%	
Liberal Democrats	E. Jones	433	7%	
Green	J. Cantwell	111	2%	
Majority		1,215		
Turnout		6,327		
