= 2002 Liverpool City Council election =

2002 UK local government election

- 2 May 2002

35 seats were up for election (one third): one seat for each of the 33 wards plus 2 by-elections 50 seats needed for a majority

Elections to Liverpool City Council were held on 2 May 2002. One third of the council was up for election and the Liberal Democrat party kept overall control of the council.

After the election, the composition of the council was

- Liberal Democrat 66
- Labour 26
- Liberal 2
- Independent 1
- Others 4

== Election result ==
Liverpool local election result 2002
Party	Seats	Gains	Losses	Net gain/loss	Seats %	Votes %	Votes	+/−
Liberal Democrats	20			-6	57.1	50.3	46,773	
Labour	14			+6	40.0	35.4	32,917	
Liberal	1			0	2.9	5.5	5,138	
Conservative	0			0	0	4.2	3,904	
Green	0			0	0	2.0	1,889	
Independent	0			0	0	1.7	1,588	
Socialist Alliance	0			0	0	0.4	360	
Socialist Labour	0			0	0	0.3	282	
BNP	0			0	0	0.2	148	

== Ward results ==
Abercromby
Party	Candidate	Votes	%	±%
Labour	Joe Anderson	1,001	65.8	
Liberal Democrats	Daniel Clein	232	15.3	
Green	Peter Cranie	165	10.8	
Conservative	Diane Watson	73	4.8	
Liberal	Arthur Carroll	50	3.3	
Majority		769	50.5	
Registered electors				
Turnout		1,521		
Labour hold		Swing		

Aigburth
Party	Candidate	Votes	%	±%
Liberal Democrats	Ron Gould	1,766	50.7	
Labour	Jack Johnson	944	27.1	
Green	Alexander Rudkin	287	8.2	
Conservative	Alma McGing	280	8.0	
Independent	Cathy Hancox	207	5.9	
Majority		822	23.6	
Turnout		3,484		

Allerton
Party	Candidate	Votes	%	±%
Liberal Democrats	Flo Clucas	2,050	55.2	
Labour	Laurence Freeman	716	19.3	
Conservative	Mark Bill	536	14.4	
Liberal	Christopher Hulme	300	8.1	
Green	Eleanor Martin	113	3.0	
Majority		1,334	35.9	
Turnout		3,715		

Anfield
Party	Candidate	Votes	%	±%
Liberal Democrats	Kiron Reid	1,633	55.5	
Labour	Kevin Doran	733	24.9	
Independent	Michael Butler	521	17.7	
Socialist Alliance	Lesley Mahmood	55	1.9	
Majority		900	30.6	
Turnout		2,942		

Arundel
Party	Candidate	Votes	%	±%
Liberal Democrats	Janet Clein	1,299	53.7	
Labour	Neville Bann	712	29.4	
Green	Donald Ross	185	7.6	
Socialist Alliance	Robert Foulkes	138	5.7	
Conservative	Ann Nugent	86	3.6	
Majority		587	24.3	
Turnout		2,420		

Breckfield
Party	Candidate	Votes	%	±%
Labour	Frank Prendergast	1,159	63.5	
Liberal Democrats	Jeremy Wright	482	26.4	
Liberal	Beryl Ackers	184	10.1	
Majority		677	37.1	
Turnout		1,825		

Broadgreen
Party	Candidate	Votes	%	±%
Liberal Democrats	David Irving	1,690	60.2	
Labour	Anthony Murphy	847	30.2	
Liberal	Maria Langley	109	3.9	
Socialist Alliance	John Ralph	90	3.2	
Conservative	Keith Sutton	73	2.6	
Majority		843	30.0	
Turnout		2,809		

Childwall (2)
Party	Candidate	Votes	%	±%
Liberal Democrats	Doreen Jones	2,754		
Liberal Democrats	Trevor Jones	2,453		
Labour	Janet Kent	689		
Labour	Sheila Murphy	689		
Conservative	Neville Liddell	239		
Conservative	George Powell	183		
Green	Terry Ezra	139		
Green	Anne Saunders	107		
Liberal	Francis Porter	104		
Turnout		7,357		

Church
Party	Candidate	Votes	%	±%
Liberal Democrats	Stephen Hurst	4,041	74.3	
Labour	Joe Roberts	880	16.2	
Green	Jenna Hegarty	273	5.0	
Conservative	Paul Harrison	244	4.5	
Majority		3,161	58.1	
Turnout		5,438		

Clubmoor
Party	Candidate	Votes	%	±%
Labour	Ben Williams	1,202	45.1	
Liberal	Paul Jones	816	30.6	
Liberal Democrats	Paul Woodruff	645	24.2	
Majority		386	14.5	
Turnout		2,663		

County
Party	Candidate	Votes	%	±%
Liberal Democrats	Karen Afford	1,565	57.1	
Labour	Patrick Delahunty	1,087	39.7	
Liberal	Roger Webb	88	3.2	
Majority		478	17.4	
Turnout		2,740		

Croxteth
Party	Candidate	Votes	%	±%
Liberal Democrats	Ann Hines	2,653	68.9	
Labour	Victor Moffatt	862	22.4	
Conservative	Geoffrey Brandwood	222	5.8	
Liberal	Barbara Pickstock	114	3.0	
Majority		1,791	46.5	
Turnout		3,851		

Dingle (2)
Party	Candidate	Votes	%	±%
Liberal Democrats	Elaine Allen	1,442		
Liberal Democrats	John Coyne	1,422		
Labour	Cathy Hawkes	1,265		
Labour	Emma Reed	1,192		
Conservative	David Patmore	92		
Socialist Alliance	Mark O'Brien	77		
Liberal	David O'Brien	70		
Turnout		5,560		

Dovecot
Party	Candidate	Votes	%	±%
Labour	Peter Killeen	1,183	48.6	
Liberal Democrats	Graham Hulme	1,022	42.0	
Liberal	Tracey Hawksford	158	6.5	
Conservative	June Brandwood	72	3.0	
Majority		161	6.6	
Turnout		2,435		

Everton
Party	Candidate	Votes	%	±%
Labour	Jane Corbett	675	55.4	
Independent	Douglas Kidd	279	22.9	
Liberal Democrats	Eleanore Clein	146	12.0	
Conservative	John Watson	55	4.5	
Green	John Whitelegg	43	3.5	
Liberal	George Roberts	21	1.7	
Majority		396	32.5	
Turnout		1,219		

Fazakerley
Party	Candidate	Votes	%	±%
Labour	Steven Rotheram	1,754	68.4	
Liberal Democrats	Alan Poole	661	25.8	
Liberal	Deborah Mayes	148	5.8	
Majority		1,093	42.6	
Turnout		2,563		

Gillmoss
Party	Candidate	Votes	%	±%
Labour	Rose Bailey	1,861	51.9	
Liberal Democrats	Laurence Sidorczuk	1,371	38.3	
Liberal	Frances Fall	178	5.0	
Conservative	Brian Jones	94	2.6	
Socialist Labour	Kai Anderson	79	2.2	
Majority		490	13.6	
Turnout		3,583		

Granby
Party	Candidate	Votes	%	±%
Labour	Gideon Ben-Tovim	962	72.0	
Liberal Democrats	Annette Butler	210	15.7	
Green	Jean Hill	103	7.7	
Conservative	Catherine Hurst	36	2.7	
Liberal	Deborah Tilston	25	1.9	
Majority		752	56.3	
Turnout		1,336		

Grassendale
Party	Candidate	Votes	%	±%
Liberal Democrats	Beatrice Fraenkel	2,857	67.9	
Labour	Catherine Dooley	761	18.1	
Conservative	Carl Cross	383	9.1	
Green	Vera Jones	160	3.8	
Liberal	Susan O'Brien	48	1.1	
Majority		2,096	49.8	
Turnout		4,209		

Kensington
Party	Candidate	Votes	%	±%
Liberal Democrats	Richard Marbrow	1,008	51.0	
Labour	Michael Fox	871	44.1	
Conservative	Francis Dunne	55	2.8	
Liberal	Michael Williams	42	2.1	
Majority		137	6.9	
Turnout		1,976		

Melrose
Party	Candidate	Votes	%	±%
Labour	Peter Dowling	1,299	60.0	
Independent	Alfie Hincks	456	21.0	
Liberal Democrats	Graham Seddon	288	13.3	
Liberal	James Richardson	126	5.8	
Majority		843	39.0	
Turnout		2,169		

Netherley
Party	Candidate	Votes	%	±%
Labour	Pauline Walton	996	55.9	
Liberal Democrats	Thomas Marshall	674	37.8	
Socialist Labour	Alan Fogg	83	4.7	
Conservative	Joyce Carrosa	28	1.6	
Majority		322	18.1	
Turnout		1,781		

Old Swan
Party	Candidate	Votes	%	±%
Liberal Democrats	Kevin Firth	1,640	65.7	
Labour	David Minahan	665	26.6	
Conservative	Francis Stevens	102	4.1	
Liberal	Christopher Lenton	91	3.6	
Majority		975	39.1	
Turnout		2,498		

Picton
Party	Candidate	Votes	%	±%
Liberal Democrats	Herbert Herrity	1,384	63.3	
Labour	Angela Glanville	653	29.9	
Green	Jennifer Andrew	102	4.7	
Conservative	Ann Temple	47	2.2	
Majority		731	33.4	
Turnout		2,186		

Pirrie
Party	Candidate	Votes	%	±%
Labour	Catherine Prayle	1,180	57.6	
Liberal Democrats	James Gaskell	583	28.5	
Liberal	Charles Mayes	120	5.9	
Conservative	Mark Cotterell	118	5.8	
Socialist Labour	Violet Shaw	48	2.3	
Majority		597	29.1	
Turnout		2,049		

St Mary's
Party	Candidate	Votes	%	±%
Liberal Democrats	Francis Roderick	1,505	59.1	
Labour	Barbara Murray	756	29.7	
BNP	Raymond Malone	148	5.8	
Liberal	Irene Mayes	90	3.5	
Conservative	Grahame Harden	47	1.8	
Majority		749	29.4	
Turnout		2,546		

Smithdown
Party	Candidate	Votes	%	±%
Labour	Richard White	711	49.6	
Liberal Democrats	Gary Airey	517	36.1	
Independent	Michael Lane	125	8.7	
Liberal	John Moore	35	2.4	
Green	Simon Holgate	28	2.0	
Conservative	Kenneth Watkin	18	1.3	
Majority		194	13.5	
Turnout		1,434		

Speke
Party	Candidate	Votes	%	±%
Labour	Raymond Carrick	634	49.2	
Liberal Democrats	George Smith	627	48.6	
Conservative	Denise Nuttall	28	2.2	
Majority		7	0.6	
Turnout		1,289		

Tuebrook
Party	Candidate	Votes	%	±%
Liberal	Hazel Williams	2,051	71.5	
Labour	Elizabeth Thomas	445	15.5	
Liberal Democrats	Jimmy Woods	263	9.2	
Conservative	Alistair Furze	59	2.1	
Green	Nadia Greger	51	1.8	
Majority		1,606	56.0	
Turnout		2,869		

Valley
Party	Candidate	Votes	%	±%
Liberal Democrats	Paula Keaveney	1,069	56.4	
Labour	Christopher Nezianya	683	36.0	
Socialist Labour	James Hackett	72	3.8	
Conservative	Derek Nuttall	48	2.5	
Liberal	Iain Woodward	25	1.3	
Majority		386	20.4	
Turnout		2,049		

Vauxhall
Party	Candidate	Votes	%	±%
Labour	Malcolm Kennedy	1,187	87.5	
Liberal Democrats	Sean McHugh	119	8.8	
Conservative	Martyn Barber	25	1.8	
Green	Anja Ploger	25	1.8	
Majority		1,068	78.7	
Turnout		1,356		

Warbreck
Party	Candidate	Votes	%	±%
Liberal Democrats	Joan Lang	2,080	62.2	
Labour	Michael Langan	1,165	34.8	
Liberal	Linda Roberts	100	3.0	
Majority		915	27.4	
Turnout		3,345		

Woolton
Party	Candidate	Votes	%	±%
Liberal Democrats	Barbara Collinge	2,622	66.6	
Conservative	Stephen Fitzsimmons	661	16.8	
Labour	Richard Keenan	498	12.7	
Green	Naomi Rose	108	2.7	
Liberal	Vivienne Woodward	45	1.1	
Majority		1,961	49.8	
Turnout		3,934		
