= 1999 Liverpool City Council election =

1999 UK local government election

← 1998	6 May 1999	2000 →

33 seats were up for election (one third): one seat for each of the 33 wards 50 seats needed for a majority

Elections to Liverpool City Council were held on 6 May 1999. One third of the council was up for election and the Liberal Democrat party kept overall control of the council. Overall turnout was 23.6%.

After the election, the composition of the council was:

Party	Seats	±
Liberal Democrat	60	+9
Labour	28	-10
Liberal Party	5	+1
Independent	2	-1
Others	4	+1

== Election results ==
Liverpool local election result 1999
Party	Seats	Gains	Losses	Net gain/loss	Seats %	Votes %	Votes	+/−
Liberal Democrats	22			+9	66.7	56.03	45,972	+0.8
Labour	7			-10	21.2	28.20	23,134	-0.2
Liberal	2			+1	6.1	7.20	5,904	
Independent	0			-1	0.0	0.51	415	
Conservative	0			0	0.0	3.94	3,234	-1.2
Green						0.62	511	

== Ward results ==
=== Abercromby ===
Abercromby
Party	Candidate	Votes	%	±%
Labour	Paul Brant	879	57.49	+3.25
Liberal Democrats	Josie Mullen	501	32.77	+6.01
Green	J.M. Brown	105	6.87	
Conservative	D.I. Watson	44	2.88	
Majority		378		
Turnout		1,074	10	

=== Aigburth ===
Aigburth
Party	Candidate	Votes	%	±%
Liberal Democrats	Dave Antrobus	2,107	64.99	+1.63
Labour	H. Adams	729	49	−4.7
Conservative	A. McGing	234	7.22	
Green	R.C. Lentle	172	5.31	
Majority		1,378		
Turnout				

=== Allerton ===
Allerton
Party	Candidate	Votes	%	±%
Liberal Democrats	Vera Best	2,470	67.80	+7.67
Labour	D. Garmann	573	15.73	−1.58
Conservative	M. E. Bill	346	9.50	
Green	R. E. Cantwell	74	2.03	
Independent	C. Hulme	180	5	
Majority		1,897		
Turnout				

=== Anfield ===
Anfield
Party	Candidate	Votes	%	±%
Liberal Democrats	Joe Kenny	1,597	61.35	−0.73
Labour	G. Wilson	725	27.85	+4.47
Conservative	B.A. Nash	42	1.61	
Liberal	J. Richardson	179	6.88	
Socialist Alliance	P. Filby	60	2.31	
Independent	C. Hulme	180	5	
Majority		1,897		
Turnout				

=== Arundel ===
Arundel
Party	Candidate	Votes	%	±%
Liberal Democrats	Mirna Juarez	1,334	60.80	+2.76
Labour	C. Evans	659	30.04	−2.36
Conservative	A. Nugent	93	4.24	
Green	D. Ross	108	+4.92	
Majority		675		
Turnout				

=== Breckfield ===
Breckfield
Party	Candidate	Votes	%	±%
Labour	John McIntosh	873	46.99	
Liberal Democrats	Harry Jones	782	42.09	20.96
Liberal	E. Bamford	148	7.97	
Ward Labour	K. Wignall	22	1.18	
Socialist Labour	J. Dooher	33	1.78	
Majority		91		
Turnout		1,858		

=== Broadgreen ===
Broadgreen
Party	Candidate	Votes	%	±%
Liberal Democrats	Chris Newby	1,593	57.30	−7.75
Labour	G. Dunphy	959	34.50	+7.18
Conservative	K. Sutton	70	2.52	
Liberal	J. Garner	158	5.68	
Majority		634		
Turnout		2,780		

=== Childwall ===
Childwall
Party	Candidate	Votes	%	±%
Liberal Democrats	Frank Ruse	2,707	69.32	−14.16
Labour	P. Williams	652	16.70	
Conservative	D. Nuttall	227	5.81	
Liberal	C. Mayes	319	8.17	
Majority		2,055		
Turnout		3,905		

=== Church ===
Church
Party	Candidate	Votes	%	±%
Liberal Democrats	Bill Roberts	3,113	71.65	
Labour	K. McNerney	715	16.46	
Conservative	N. Liddell	216	4.97	
Liberal	F. Porter	201	6.93	
Majority		2,398		
Turnout		4,345		

=== Clubmoor ===
Clubmoor
Party	Candidate	Votes	%	±%
Liberal	G.W. Smith	1,014	42.46%	
Labour	B. Williams	899	37.65%	
Liberal Democrats	S. Monkcom	316	13.23%	
Socialist Labour	K. Anderson	71	2.97%	
Conservative	G.M. Hicklin	40	1.68%	
Majority		115		
Turnout				

=== County ===
County
Party	Candidate	Votes	%	±%
Liberal Democrats	M. Fielding	1,975	71.04%	
Labour	G. Jones	676	24.32%	
Socialist Labour	K. Anderson	71	2.97%	
Ward Labour	S. Bennett	48	2.01%	
Liberal	R. Webb	46	1.65%	
Conservative	K. Watkin	31	1.12%	
Majority		1,299		
Turnout				

=== Croxteth ===
Croxteth
Party	Candidate	Votes	%	±%
Liberal Democrats	Norman Mills	2,567	71.97%	
Labour	V. Moffatt	594	16.65%	
Conservative	G. Brandwood	216	6.06%	
Liberal	M. Williams	138	3.87%	
Green	I. Graham	52	1.46%	
Majority		1,973		
Turnout				

=== Dingle ===
Dingle
Party	Candidate	Votes	%	±%
Liberal Democrats	Julie Gosling	1,442	61.02%	
Labour	B. Redmond	828	35.04%	
Conservative	D. Patmore	93	3.94%	
Majority		614		
Turnout				

=== Dovecot ===
Dovecot
Party	Candidate	Votes	%	±%
Liberal Democrats	R. Ousby	985	53.1%	
Labour	R. Quinn	701	37.39%	
Conservative	W.H. Connolly	39	2.1%	
Liberal	S. Hawksford	130	7.01%	
Ward Labour	B. Walsh	0	0%	
Majority		284		
Turnout				

=== Everton ===
Everton
Party	Candidate	Votes	%	±%
Ward Labour	C. Dooley	654	58.13%	
Labour	N. Bann	307	27.29%	
Liberal Democrats	S. McHugh	87	7.73%	
Socialist Labour	J. Rutledge	44	3.91%	
Conservative	J.L. Perry	14	1.24%	
Majority		347		
Turnout				

=== Fazakerley ===
Fazakerley
Party	Candidate	Votes	%	±%
Labour	Jack Spriggs	1,423	52.37%	
Liberal Democrats	F. Forrester	1,093	40.23%	
Conservative	E.O. Bayley	84	3.09%	
Majority		330		
Turnout				

=== Gillmoss ===
Gillmoss
Party	Candidate	Votes	%	±%
Liberal Democrats	P. Moloney	1,445	50.07%	
Labour	J. Murphy	810	28.07%	
Conservative	B. Jones	62	2.15%	
Ward Labour	J. White	367	12.72%	
Liberal	F.E. Fall	202	7.0%	
Majority		635		
Turnout				

=== Granby ===
Granby
Party	Candidate	Votes	%	±%
Labour	Alan Dean	760	57.79%	
Liberal Democrats	M.Osi-Efa	412	31.33%	
Conservative	C. Hirst	68	5.17%	
Socialist Alliance	C. Wilson	75	5.70%	
Majority		348		
Turnout				

=== Grassendale ===
Grassendale
Party	Candidate	Votes	%	±%
Liberal Democrats	Gerry Scott	2,875	73.93%	
Labour	L. Mackerel	545	14.01%	
Conservative	C. Cross	284	7.30%	
Liberal	K. Woodward	185	4.76%	
Majority		2,330		
Turnout				

=== Kensington ===
Kensington
Party	Candidate	Votes	%	±%
Liberal Democrats	Frank Doran	1,510	72.81%	
Labour	T. Allen	530	25.55%	
Conservative	I. MacFall	34	1.64%	
Majority		980		
Turnout				

=== Melrose ===
Melrose
Party	Candidate	Votes	%	±%
Labour	R. Lancaster	849	44.87%	
Liberal Democrats	K. Oates	809	42.76%	
Ward Labour	W. Thomas	130	6.87%	
Liberal	J. Woods	78	4.12%	
Conservative	M. Cotterall	26	1.37%	
Majority		40		
Turnout				

=== Netherley ===
Netherley
Party	Candidate	Votes	%	±%
Labour	Oliver Martins	801	49.81%	
Liberal Democrats	D. Kent	667	41.48%	
Socialist Labour	A. D. Fogg	116	7.21%	
Conservative	P. Hughes	24	1.49%	
Majority		134		
Turnout				

=== Old Swan ===
Old Swan
Party	Candidate	Votes	%	±%
Liberal Democrats	Keith Turner	1,492	64.90%	
Labour	D. Harty	475	20.66%	
Liberal	A. Carroll	178	7.74%	
Conservative	S. Lennard	77	3.35%	
Socialist Labour	G. Williams	77	3.35%	
Majority		1,017		
Turnout				

=== Picton ===
Picton
Party	Candidate	Votes	%	±%
Liberal Democrats	Erica Kemp	1,579	70.30%	
Labour	A. Glanville	631	28.09%	
Conservative	W. Hobhouse	36	1.60%	
Majority		948		
Turnout				

=== Pirrie ===
Pirrie
Party	Candidate	Votes	%	±%
Labour	J. Gouldbourne	849	47.99%	
Liberal Democrats	F. Johnston	553	31.26%	
Conservative	F. Stevens	56	3.17%	
Liberal	K. Buchannan	299	16.90%	
Ward Labour	J. Kidd	12	0.68%	
Majority		296		
Turnout				

=== St. Mary's ===
St. Mary's
Party	Candidate	Votes	%	±%
Liberal Democrats	Richard Oglethorpe	1,722	71.25%	
Labour	M. Harrison	603	24.95%	
Conservative	G. Harden	33	1.37%	
Liberal	V. Woodward	59	2.44%	
Majority		1,119		
Turnout				

=== Smithdown ===
Smithdown
Party	Candidate	Votes	%	±%
Liberal Democrats	Andrew Makinson	668	50.30%	
Labour	R. Keenan	515	38.78%	
Liberal	J. Moore	70	5.27%	
Conservative	J. Cole	28	2.11%	
Ward Labour	L. Evans	12	0.90%	
Majority		153		
Turnout				

=== Speke ===
Speke
Party	Candidate	Votes	%	±%
Liberal Democrats	D. Hughes	892	55.27%	
Labour	M. Rasmussen	663	41.08%	
Liberal	I. Smith	36	2.23%	
Conservative	D. Nuttall	23	1.43%	
Majority		229		
Turnout				

=== Tuebrook ===
Tuebrook
Party	Candidate	Votes	%	±%
Liberal	Tom Carter	2,055	69.15%	
Labour	B. McGrath	430	14.47%	
Liberal Democrats	L. Kinnahan	184	6.19%	
Conservative	J. Brandwood	68	2.29%	
Independent Liberal	K. McCullough	235	7.91%	
Majority		1.625		
Turnout				

=== Valley ===
Valley
Party	Candidate	Votes	%	±%
Liberal Democrats	Frank O'Donoghue	1,373	71.77%	
Labour	N. Small	424	22.16%	
Liberal	I. Mayes	83	4.34%	
Conservative	M. Williams	33	1.73%	
Majority		949		
Turnout				

=== Vauxhall ===
Vauxhall
Party	Candidate	Votes	%	±%
Ward Labour	Pauline Connolly	840	46.82%	
Labour	F. Orr	810	45.15%	
Liberal Democrats	E. Wilkinson	102	5.69%	
Liberal	C. Woodruff	32	1.78%	
Conservative	J. Watson	10	0.56%	
Majority		30		
Turnout				

=== Warbreck ===
Warbreck
Party	Candidate	Votes	%	±%
Liberal Democrats	Jean Newton	2,004	60.56%	
Labour	L. Hughes	827	24.99%	
Liberal	D. A. Mayes	294	8.88%	
Socialist Labour	J. A. Hackett	103	3.11%	
Conservative	E. Nash	81	2.45%	
Majority		1,177		
Turnout				

=== Woolton ===
Woolton
Party	Candidate	Votes	%	±%
Liberal Democrats	Barbara Mace	3,016	73.89%	
Conservative	S. Fitzsimmons	502	12.30%	
Labour	W. Braben	420	10.29%	
Socialist Labour	M. Langley	144	3.53%	
Majority		2,596		
Turnout				
