= 1998 Liverpool City Council election =

1998 UK local government election

- 7 May 1998

33 seats were up for election (one third): one seat for each of the 33 wards 50 seats needed for a majority

Elections to Liverpool City Council were held on 7 May 1998. One third of the council was up for election and the Liberal Democrat party took control of the council from the Labour Party.

After the election the composition of the council was:

Party	Seats	±
Liberal Democrat	52	+10
Labour	39	-8
Militant Labour	3	-1
Liberal Party	4	+2
Independent	1	-1
Conservative	0	-2

== Election results ==
Liverpool local election result 1998
Party	Seats	Gains	Losses	Net gain/loss	Seats %	Votes %	Votes	+/−
Liberal Democrats	23			+10	67.6	54.9	43,587	
Labour	9			-8	26.5	28.3	20,829	
Liberal	2			+2	5.9	8.0	6,426	
Conservative	0			-2	0.0	5.1	4,025	
Independent	0			-1	0.0			
	0			-1	0.0			

== Ward results ==
=== Abercromby ===
Abercromby - 2 seats
Party	Candidate	Votes	%	±%
Labour	Joe Anderson	588	54%	
Labour	S. Mumby	547	50%	
Liberal Democrats	C. Barnett	290	25.75%	
Liberal Democrats	J.Cowan	244	25.75%	
Liberal	M. Wingfield	71	7%	
Conservative	C.P.S. Biller	42	4%	
Conservative	C.S. Harley	41	4%	
Majority		298		
Registered electors				
Turnout				
Labour hold		Swing		
Labour hold		Swing		

=== Aigburth ===
Aigburth
Party	Candidate	Votes	%	±%
Liberal Democrats	R. Gould	1,757	63.36%	
Labour	J. Middleton	754	27%	
Conservative	A. McGing	262	9%	
Majority		1,003		
Turnout				

=== Allerton ===
Allerton
Party	Candidate	Votes	%	±%
Liberal Democrats	Flo Clucas	2,015	60.13%	
Labour	P. Rhodes	580	17%	
Conservative	M.E. Bill	405	12%	
Allerton Lib Dem Ward Resident	C. Hulme	351	10%	
Majority		1,435		
Turnout				

=== Anfield ===
Anfield
Party	Candidate	Votes	%	±%
Liberal Democrats	Kiron Reid	1.739	62.08%	
Labour	A. Keenan	655	23%	
Liberal	S. Brooks	305	11%	
Socialist	P. Filby	61	2%	
Conservative	E.A. Jones	57	2%	
Official Labour	G. Casey	45	2%	
Independent	H. Jones	32	1%	
Majority		1,084		
Turnout				

=== Arundel ===
Arundel
Party	Candidate	Votes	%	±%
Liberal Democrats	Jan Clein	1,324	58%	
Labour	H. Burrage	739	32%	
Socialist Labour	I. Foulkes	143	6%	
Conservative	D.I. Watson	75	3%	
Majority		585		
Turnout				

=== Breckfield ===
Breckfield
Party	Candidate	Votes	%	±%
Labour	Frank Prendergast	721	37%	
Liberal Democrats	J. Clucas	413	21%	
Liberal	M. Seigar	91	5%	
Socialist Labour	J. Dooher	90	5%	
Conservative	E. Bayley	77	4%	
Majority		308		
Turnout				

=== Broadgreen ===
Broadgreen
Party	Candidate	Votes	%	±%
Liberal Democrats	Dave Irving	2,029	65%	
Labour	A. Concepcion	852	27%	
Liberal	J. Newall	154	5%	
Majority		1,177		
Turnout				

=== Childwall ===
Childwall
Party	Candidate	Votes	%	±%
Liberal Democrats	Lady Doreen Jones	3,452	48%	
Labour	L. French	513	12%	
Conservative	A. Garnett	170	4%	
Majority		2,939		
Turnout				

=== Church ===
Church
Party	Candidate	Votes	%	±%
Liberal Democrats	Len Tyrer	2,990	89.6%	
Conservative	G.Fawcett	275	8%	
Labour	H. Adams	72	2%	
Majority		2,918		
Turnout				

=== Clubmoor ===
Clubmoor
Party	Candidate	Votes	%	±%
Liberal	Paul Woodruff	910	42%	
Labour	B. Williams	645	29%	
Official New Labour	J. Kenny	563	26%	
Liberal Democrats	R. Ousby	500	23%	
Socialist Labour	K. Anderson	75	3%	
Conservative	G. Hicklin	41	2%	
Majority		275		
Turnout				

=== County ===
County
Party	Candidate	Votes	%	±%
Liberal Democrats	Karren Afford	2,010	72%	
Labour	T. Denny	613	22%	
Socialist	L. Mahmood	63	2%	
Conservative	J. Atkinson	58	2%	
Majority		1,397		
Turnout				

=== Croxteth ===
Croxteth
Party	Candidate	Votes	%	±%
Liberal Democrats	A. Hines	2,394	70%	
Labour	V. Moffatt	554	16%	
Conservative	G. Brandwood	275	8%	
Liberal	R. Cameron	175	5%	
Majority		1,840		
Turnout				

=== Dingle ===
Dingle
Party	Candidate	Votes	%	±%
Liberal Democrats	E. Phelan	1,309	60%	
Labour	S. Sharma	718	33%	
Conservative	D. Patmore	94	4%	
Socialist	P. Dunne	65	3%	
Majority		591		
Turnout				

=== Dovecot ===
Dovecot
Party	Candidate	Votes	%	±%
Liberal Democrats	Graham Hulme	543	35%	
Labour	J. Jones	476	31%	
Liberal	K. Buchanan	355	23%	
Ward Labour	B. Walsh	112	7%	
Conservative	W.H. Connolly	71	5%	
Majority		67		
Turnout				

=== Everton ===
Everton
Party	Candidate	Votes	%	±%
Labour	P. Brennan	432	48%	
Ward Labour	C.M. Dooley	372	41%	
Liberal Democrats	W. Allen	75	8%	
Liberal	A. Taylor	26	3%	
Majority		60		
Turnout				

=== Fazakerley ===
Fazakerley
Party	Candidate	Votes	%	±%
Liberal Democrats	A. Poole	947	43%	
Labour	E. Thomas	768	35%	
Liberal	S. Rutherford	213	10%	
Ward Labour	C.A. Heron	166	8%	
Conservative	D. Johnson	94	4%	
Majority		179		
Turnout				

=== Gillmoss ===
Gillmoss
Party	Candidate	Votes	%	±%
Labour	Rose Bailey	682	26%	
Ward Labour	C. Morgan	621	23%	
Liberal	F. Fall	583	22%	
Liberal Democrats	S. Monkcom	560	21%	
Independent	E. Burke	119	4%	
Conservative	B. Jones	93	3%	
Majority		122		
Turnout				

=== Granby ===
Granby
Party	Candidate	Votes	%	±%
Labour	Gideon Ben-Tovim	752	62%	
Liberal Democrats	D. Lewis	339	28%	
Socialist	C.Wilson	92	8%	
Majority		413		
Turnout				

=== Grassendale ===
Grassendale
Party	Candidate	Votes	%	±%
Liberal Democrats	Beatrice Fraenkel	2,596	72%	
Labour	A. Burrage	560	16%	
Conservative	C. Cross	368	10%	
Liberal	J. Moore	52	1%	
Natural Law	G. Mead	10	0.3%	
Majority		2,036		
Turnout				

=== Kensington ===
Kensington
Party	Candidate	Votes	%	±%
Liberal Democrats	Richard Marbrow	1,280	61%	
Labour	J. Hamilton	525	25%	
Liberal	M. Bickley	254	12%	
Conservative	I. McFall	42	2%	
Majority		755		
Turnout				

=== Melrose ===
Melrose
Party	Candidate	Votes	%	±%
Labour	F. Kidd	629	37%	
Ward Labour	B.P. Hincks	481	28%	
Liberal Democrats	F. Forrester	361	21%	
Liberal	T. Newall	185	11%	
Conservative	A. Nugent	50	3%	
Majority		148		
Turnout				

=== Netherley ===
Netherley
Party	Candidate	Votes	%	±%
Liberal Democrats	T. Marshall	594	48%	
Labour	D. Garman	472	38%	
Socialist Labour	A. Fogg	132	11%	
Conservative	P. Hughes	34	3%	
Independent	M. Fowler	28	2%	
Majority		122		
Turnout				

=== Old Swan ===
Old Swan
Party	Candidate	Votes	%	±%
Liberal Democrats	Kevin Firth	1,631	65%	
Labour	D. Minahan	643	26%	
Liberal	F. Carroll	169	7%	
Conservative	S. Lennard	64	3%	
Majority		988		
Turnout				

=== Picton ===
Picton
Party	Candidate	Votes	%	±%
Liberal Democrats	H. Herrity	1,631	67%	
Labour	J. Nolan	712	29%	
Conservative	P.D. Barron	76	3%	
Majority		919		
Turnout				

=== Pirrie ===
Pirrie
Party	Candidate	Votes	%	±%
Labour	C. Prayle	741	49%	
Liberal Democrats	M. Kelly	372	25%	
Liberal	C. Mayes	301	20%	
Conservative	F.V. Stevens	88	6%	
Majority		369		
Turnout				

=== St. Mary's ===
St. Mary's
Party	Candidate	Votes	%	±%
Liberal Democrats	F. Roderick	1,442	56%	
Labour	M. Rasmussen	885	35%	
Liberal	P. Hayes	172	7%	
Conservative	D.M. Nuttall	42	2%	
Majority		537		
Turnout				

=== Smithdown ===
Smithdown
Party	Candidate	Votes	%	±%
Liberal Democrats	G. Airey	681	51%	
Labour	N. Bann	525	39%	
Liberal	M. Williams	77	6%	
Ward Labour	V. Marsland	53	4%	
Majority		156		
Turnout				

=== Speke ===
Speke
Party	Candidate	Votes	%	±%
Liberal Democrats	G. Smith	856	56%	
Labour	P. Bostok	508	33%	
Liberal	M. Langley	126	8%	
Conservative	M. Williams	36	2%	
Majority		348		
Turnout				

=== Tuebrook ===
Tuebrook
Party	Candidate	Votes	%	±%
Liberal	Hazel Williams	1,958	73%	
Labour	B. Lawless	434	16%	
Liberal Democrats	L. Kinahan	233	9%	
Conservative	A.E. Bowness	71	3%	
Majority		1,524		
Turnout				

=== Valley ===
Valley
Party	Candidate	Votes	%	±%
Liberal Democrats	D. Craig	1,531	67%	
Labour	I. Harvey	596	26%	
Liberal	I. Mayes	47	2%	
Conservative	J. Perry	34	1%	
Majority		935		
Turnout				

=== Vauxhall ===
Vauxhall
Party	Candidate	Votes	%	±%
Labour	M. Kennedy	715	62%	
Ward Labour	F. Murphy	284	25%	
Liberal Democrats	T. Drake	98	9%	
Liberal	D. Mayes	52	5%	
Majority		617	1,149	
Turnout				

=== Warbreck ===
Warbreck
Party	Candidate	Votes	%	±%
Liberal Democrats	J. Lang	2,165	71%	
Labour	P. Harvey	778	26%	
Conservative	A. Gray	89	3%	
Majority		1,387		
Turnout				

=== Woolton ===
Woolton
Party	Candidate	Votes	%	±%
Liberal Democrats	Barbara Collinge	3,206	70%	
Conservative	S. Fitzsimmons	817	17%	
Labour	B.C. Wilde	455	10%	
Liberal	G. Bellas	99	2%	
Majority		2,751		
Turnout				
