= 1994 Liverpool City Council election =

1994 UK local government election

- 5 May 1994

34 seats were up for election (one third): one seat for each of the 33 wards plus one by-election 50 seats needed for a majority

Elections to Liverpool City Council were held on 5 May 1994. One-third of the council was up for election and the Labour Party retained leadership of the council as a minority administration.

As of 2026, this was the last Liverpool City Council election where a Conservative was elected.

After the election, the composition of the council was:

Party	Seats	±
Labour	44	??
Liberal Democrat	44	??
Ward Labour	7	??
Conservative Party	2	??
Liberal Party	2	??

== Election results ==
Liverpool local election result 1994
Party	Seats	Gains	Losses	Net gain/loss	Seats %	Votes %	Votes	+/−
Labour	18					44%	57,011	
Liberal Democrats	13					40%	51,825	
Conservative	1				3%	6%	7,948	
Liberal	1				3%	5%	6,116	
Liverpool Labour	1				3%	4%	5,379	
Green	0				0%	1%	??	
Others								

== Ward results ==
=== Abercromby ===
Abercromby
Party	Candidate	Votes	%	±%
Labour	J. Hackett	1,374	74%	▲1%
Liberal Democrats	Nigel Dyer	223	12%	▲6%
Green	J. Brown	112	6%	▼5%
Conservative	P. Edwards	89	5%	▼6%
Liberal	J. Highcock	69	4%	N/A
Majority		1,151		
Registered electors				
Turnout		1,867		
Labour hold		Swing	▲1%	

=== Aigburth ===
Aigburth
Party	Candidate	Votes	%	±%
Liberal Democrats	Ron Gould	2,450	53%	
Labour	M. McDaid	1,520	33%	
Conservative	A. McGing	425	9%	
Green	R. Lentle	269	6%	
Majority		930		
Turnout		4,664		

=== Allerton ===
Allerton
Party	Candidate	Votes	%	±%
Liberal Democrats	Flo Clucas	2,951	58%	
Labour	K. Dovaston	1,435	28%	
Conservative	G. Brandwood	595	12%	
Green	R. Cantwell	91	2%	
Majority		1,516		
Turnout		5,027		

=== Anfield ===
Anfield
Party	Candidate	Votes	%	±%
Labour	R. Carrick	1,712	44%	
Liberal Democrats	R. Cunningham	1,667	43%	
Conservative	C. Cross	161	4%	
Liberal	J. Kehoe	252	6%	
Independent	R. Fallows	113	3%	
Majority		45		
Turnout		3,905		

=== Arundel ===
Arundel
Party	Candidate	Votes	%	±%
Liberal Democrats	Jan Clein	1,628	45%	
Labour	A. Cleary	1,591	44%	
Conservative	K. Edwards	150	4%	
Liberal	D. Jones	139	4%	
Green	L. Lever	135	4%	
Majority		37		
Turnout		3,643		

=== Breckfield ===
Breckfield
Party	Candidate	Votes	%	±%
Labour	Frank Prendergast	2,229	77%	
Liberal Democrats	Karren Afford	461	16%	
Conservative	E. Bayley	196	7%	
Majority		1,768		
Turnout		2,886		

=== Broadgreen ===
Broadgreen
Party	Candidate	Votes	%	±%
Labour	A. Concepcion	2,349	50%	
Liberal Democrats	K. MacDonald	2,049	43%	
Conservative	I. MacFall	198	4%	
Ward Independent Labour	J. Mooney	119	3%	
Majority		300		
Turnout		4,715		

=== Childwall ===
Childwall
Party	Candidate	Votes	%	±%
Liberal Democrats	Doreen Jones	3,863	72%	
Labour	H. Gibson	1,041	19%	
Conservative	E. Bishop	484	9%	
Majority		2,822		
Turnout		5,388		

=== Church ===
Church
Party	Candidate	Votes	%	±%
Liberal Democrats	Len Tyrer	3,854	67%	
Labour	M. Anderson	1,326	23%	
Conservative	A. Knowlson	425	7%	
Green	I. Gilmour	166	3%	
Majority		2,528		
Turnout		5,771		

=== Clubmoor ===
Clubmoor 2 seats
Party	Candidate	Votes	%	±%
Labour	Joe Kenny	2,215	62%	
Labour	P. Harvey	2,081		
Liberal	B. Jackson	672	19%	
Liberal	S. Owen	419	14%	
Liberal Democrats	L. Kinahan	438	12%	
Liberal Democrats	H. Owen	416	13%	
Conservative	J. Brandwood	225	6%	
Conservative	F. Stevens	166		
Majority		1,777		
Turnout		6,632		

=== County ===
County
Party	Candidate	Votes	%	±%
Liberal Democrats	B. Brown	2,524	52%	
Labour	J. Hamilton	2,182	45%	
Conservative	J. Atkinson	115	2%	
Majority		342		
Turnout		4,821		

=== Croxteth ===
Croxteth
Party	Candidate	Votes	%	±%
Liberal Democrats	A. Hines	3,210	57%	
Labour	B. McGrath	1,588	28%	
Conservative	E. Nash	553	10%	
Liberal	C. Paton	214	4%	
Green	I. Graham	76	1%	
Majority		1,622		
Turnout		5,641		

=== Dingle ===
Dingle
Party	Candidate	Votes	%	±%
Liberal Democrats	Julie Gosling	1,887	46%	
Labour	M. McDaid	1,750	42%	
Conservative	D. Patmore	139	3%	
Majority		137		
Turnout		4,134		

=== Dovecot ===
Dovecot
Party	Candidate	Votes	%	±%
Labour	F. Nelson	1,717	62%	
Liberal Democrats	John Clucas	658	24%	
Ward Independent Labour	K. Williams	196	7%	
Conservative	W. Connolly	180	7%	
Majority		1,059		
Turnout		2,751		

=== Everton ===
Everton
Party	Candidate	Votes	%	±%
Labour	P. Brennan	1,089	65%	
Ward Labour	V. Brownless	494	29%	
Liberal Democrats	Jeremy Chowings	51	3%	
Ward Independent	J. Hackett	34	2%	
Conservative	J. McEachern	17	1%	
Majority		1,038		
Turnout		1,685		

=== Fazakerley ===
Fazakerley
Party	Candidate	Votes	%	±%
Labour	E. Thomas	2,293	70%	
Liberal Democrats	A. Poole	475	14%	
Conservative	D. Johnston	200	6%	
Liberal	P. Mayne	319	10%	
Majority		1,818		
Turnout		3,287		

=== Gillmoss ===
Gillmoss
Party	Candidate	Votes	%	±%
Labour	Ken Stewart	2,064	47%	
Liberal Democrats	George Mann	703	16%	
Conservative	B. Jones	191	4%	
Ward Labour	A, Jennings	1,391	31%	
Green	A. Graham	85	2%	
Majority		1,361		
Turnout		4,434		

=== Granby ===
Granby
Party	Candidate	Votes	%	±%
Labour	Gideon Ben Tovim	1,449	57%	
Liberal	A. Damsell	640	25%	
Militant Labour	C. Wilson	274	11%	
Green	R. Morris	102	4%	
Conservative	T. Morrison	61	2%	
Majority		1,339		
Turnout		2,526		

=== Grassendale ===
Grassendale
Party	Candidate	Votes	%	±%
Liberal Democrats	Beatrice Fraenkel	3,752	69%	
Labour	J. Middleton	1,175	22%	
Conservative	N. Liddell	482	9%	
Majority		2,577		
Turnout		5,409		

=== Kensington ===
Kensington
Party	Candidate	Votes	%	±%
Labour	A. Keenan	1,751	45%	
Liberal Democrats	A. Hulme	1,735	45%	
Liberal	M. Bickley	169	4%	
Green	M. Walsh	83	2%	
Conservative	F. Wood	72	2%	
Ward Independent Labour	G. Williams	41	1%	
Majority		16		
Turnout		3,851		

=== Melrose ===
Melrose
Party	Candidate	Votes	%	±%
Labour	D. Booth	2,342	69%	
Liberal Democrats	M. Homfray	583	17%	
Militant Labour	L. Mahmood	368	11%	
Conservative	A. Nugent	97	3%	
Majority		1,759		
Turnout		3,390		

=== Netherley ===
Netherley
Party	Candidate	Votes	%	±%
Labour	T. Griffin	1,242	57%	
Liberal Democrats	D. Seddon	554	25%	
Broad Left Labour	A. Fogg	340	16%	
Conservative	I. Prosser	56	3%	
Majority		688		
Turnout		2,192		

=== Old Swan ===
Old Swan
Party	Candidate	Votes	%	±%
Liberal Democrats	J. Downham	1,810	43%	
Labour	L. Richlings	1,421	34%	
Conservative	N. Hastings	100	2%	
Liberal	?	307	7%	
Majority		389		
Turnout		4,183		

=== Picton ===
Picton
Party	Candidate	Votes	%	±%
Liberal Democrats	H. Herrity	2,347	55%	
Labour	Oliver Martins	1,608	40%	
Green	A. Willan	86	2%	
Conservative	Thérèse Coffey	79	2%	
Ward Independent Labour	J. Spencer	43	1%	
Majority		659		
Turnout		4,243		

=== Pirrie ===
Pirrie
Party	Candidate	Votes	%	±%
Labour	F. Gibbons	2,444	76%	
Liberal Democrats	P. Dutton	396	12%	
Liberal	C. Mayes	230	7%	
Conservative	B. Nash	141	4%	
Majority		2,048		
Turnout		3,211		

=== St. Mary's ===
St. Mary's
Party	Candidate	Votes	%	±%
Liberal Democrats	Frank Roderick	2,298	58%	
Labour	T. Smith	1,609	40%	
Conservative	G. Harden	70	2%	
Majority		689		
Turnout		3,977		

=== Smithdown ===
Smithdown
Party	Candidate	Votes	%	±%
Labour	Neville Bann	1,592	61%	
Liberal Democrats	G. Hulme	853	33%	
Liberal	M. Langley	111	4%	
Conservative	D. O'Leary	41	2%	
Majority		739		
Turnout		2,597		

=== Speke ===
Speke
Party	Candidate	Votes	%	±%
Labour	P. Bostock	1,462	55%	
Liberal Democrats	W. Hughes	782	30%	
Conservative	A. Garnett	71	3%	
Ward Labour	M. Knight	334	13%	
Majority		680		
Turnout		2,649		

=== Tuebrook ===
Tuebrook
Party	Candidate	Votes	%	±%
Liberal	D. Curtiss	2,223	49%	
Labour	F. Orr	1,157	26%	
Liberal Democrats	M. Hyett	1,066	24%	
Conservative	R. Bethell	90	2%	
Majority		1,066		
Turnout		4,536		

=== Valley ===
Valley
Party	Candidate	Votes	%	±%
Labour	O. Harvey	1,454	48%	
Liberal Democrats	Frank Ruse	1,257	41%	
Local Resident	Frank O'Donoghue	239	8%	
Conservative	P. Finnih	100	3%	
Majority		197		
Turnout		3,050		

=== Vauxhall ===
Vauxhall
Party	Candidate	Votes	%	±%
Ward Labour	F. Murphy	957	46%	
Labour	W. Snell	893	43%	
Liberal Democrats	N. Deas	123	6%	
Ward independent Labour	J. McGrath	95	5%	
Majority		64		
Turnout		2,068		

=== Warbreck ===
Warbreck
Party	Candidate	Votes	%	±%
Liberal Democrats	J. Lang	2,978	54%	
Labour	W. Ritchie	2,275	41%	
Conservative	D. Gray	189	3%	
Liberal	J. Donohue	112	2%	
Majority		703		
Turnout		5,554		

=== Woolton ===
Woolton
Party	Candidate	Votes	%	±%
Conservative	S. Fitzsimmons	1,790	34%	
Liberal Democrats	B. Lewis	1,783	34%	
Labour	C. Evans	1,501	28%	
Liberal	A. Halewood	240	5%	
Majority		7		
Turnout		5,314		
