= 1992 Liverpool City Council election =

British election

- 7 May 1992

33 seats were up for election (one third): one seat for each of the 33 wards 50 seats needed for a majority

Elections to Liverpool City Council were held on 7 May 1992. One third of the council was up for election and although the Labour Party lost overall control of the council, it continued to lead a minority administration with Harry Rimmer as leader of the council.

After the election, the composition of the council was:

Party	Seats	±
Labour	??	??
Liberal Democrat	??	??
Liberal Party	??	??
Independent	??	??
Others	??	??

== Election results ==
Liverpool local election result 1992
Party	Seats	Gains	Losses	Net gain/loss	Seats %	Votes %	Votes	+/−
Liberal Democrats	18				55%	38%	42,327	
Labour	12				36%	33%	36,681	
Conservative	1				3%	13%	14,422	
Ward Labour	1				3%	10%	10,676	
Liberal	1				3%	3%	3,341	
Green	0				0%	0.9%	1,054	
Poll Tax Payer Against the surcharge	0				0%	0.2%	192	

== Ward results ==
=== Abercromby ===
Abercromby
Party	Candidate	Votes	%	±%
Labour	Sarah Norman	1,080	71%	▼10%
Liberal Democrats	Nigel Dyer	171	11%	▲4%
Conservative	A. Zsigmond	156	10%	▼3%
Green	S. Mansfield	117	8%	N/A
Majority		909		
Registered electors				
Turnout				
Labour hold		Swing	▼10%	

=== Aigburth ===
Aigburth
Party	Candidate	Votes	%	±%
Liberal Democrats	Cathy Hancox	2,508	56%	
Labour	J. Middleton	1,024	23%	
Conservative	Elizabeth Furman	797	18%	
Green	Janifer Jones	142	3%	
Majority		1,484		
Turnout				

=== Allerton ===
Allerton
Party	Candidate	Votes	%	±%
Liberal Democrats	W. Bullock	1,887	42%	
Conservative	S. North	1,409	31%	
Labour	Mary Anderson	1,061	24%	
Green	R. Cantwell	79	2%	
Social Democrat	I. Garbett	41	1%	
Majority		478		
Turnout				

=== Anfield ===
Anfield
Party	Candidate	Votes	%	±%
Liberal Democrats	Paul Woodruff	1,513	39%	
Labour	J. Rutledge	1,320	34%	
Conservative	Myra Fitzsimmons	408	11%	
Anfield Labour	Judith Nelson	389	10%	
Liberal	T. Newall	234	6%	
Majority		193		
Turnout				

=== Arundel ===
Arundel
Party	Candidate	Votes	%	±%
Liberal Democrats	Paul Clein	1,167	38%	
Labour	Vicki Roberts	1,069	34%	
Conservative	Carol Zsigmond	326	11%	
Green	J. Hulton	260	8%	
Arundel Labour	J. Stancer	259	8%	
Social Democrat	D. Pollard	18	1%	
Majority		98		
Turnout				

=== Breckfield ===
Breckfield
Party	Candidate	Votes	%	±%
Labour	Mary McGiveron	1,382	61%	
Liberal Democrats	F. Crebbin	387	17%	
Conservative	Elizabeth Bayley	285	12%	
Liverpool Independent Labour	H. Chase	230	10%	
Majority		995		
Turnout				

=== Broadgreen ===
Broadgreen
Party	Candidate	Votes	%	±%
Liberal Democrats	Rosie Cooper	2,660	61%	
Labour	D. Minahan	1,119	26%	
Conservative	N. hastings	242	6%	
Broadgreen Labour	F. Gillard	305	7%	
Majority		1,541		
Turnout				

=== Childwall ===
Childwall
Party	Candidate	Votes	%	±%
Liberal Democrats	Eddie Clein	3,171	61%	
Labour	A. Doherty	898	17%	
Conservative	Helen Rigby	1,121	22%	
Majority		2,273		
Turnout				

=== Church ===
Church
Party	Candidate	Votes	%	±%
Liberal Democrats	Mike Storey	3,834	68%	
Labour	K. Cocklin	877	16%	
Conservative	A. Knowlson	793	14%	
Green	Deborah Kinn	101	2%	
Majority		2,957		
Turnout				

=== Clubmoor ===
Clubmoor
Party	Candidate	Votes	%	±%
Labour	S. Ellison	1,680	59%	
Conservative	E. Harper	448	16%	
Liberal	Barbara Jackson	424	15%	
Liberal Democrats	B. Williams	319	11%	
Majority		1,361		
Turnout				

=== County ===
County
Party	Candidate	Votes	%	±%
Liberal Democrats	Paul Clark	2,762	61%	
Labour	I. Harvey	1,519	34%	
Conservative	J. Atkinson	206	5%	
Social Democrat	R. Gould	12	0.3%	
Majority		1,243		
Turnout				

=== Croxteth ===
Croxteth
Party	Candidate	Votes	%	±%
Liberal Democrats	Elaine Kinahan	2,787	57%	
Labour	F. Nelson	1,072	22%	
Conservative	G. Brandwood	972	20%	
Social Democrat	Virginia Gould	35	1%	
Green	I. Graham	20	0.4%	
Majority		1,715		
Turnout				

=== Dingle ===
Dingle
Party	Candidate	Votes	%	±%
Liberal Democrats	J. Rossington	1,388	38%	
Labour	R. Lafferty	1,133	31%	
Dingle Labour	Christine Campos	828	23%	
Conservative	D. Patmore	202	6%	
Green	R. Spalding	79	2%	
Majority		255		
Turnout		3,630		

=== Dovecot ===
Dovecot
Party	Candidate	Votes	%	±%
Labour	H. Rimmer	1,085	48%	
Dovecot Labour	T. Fitzsimmons	387	17%	
Liberal Democrats	S. Woodward	310	14%	
Conservative	W. Connolly	267	12%	
Poll tax payers against the surcharge	Christine Young	192	9%	
Majority		698		
Turnout		2,241		

=== Everton ===
Everton
Party	Candidate	Votes	%	±%
Everton Labour	George Knibb	894	58%	
Labour	Pauline Davies	577	37%	
Conservative	Joan McEachern	45	3%	
Liberal Democrats	Annette Butler	32	2%	
Majority		317		
Turnout		1,548		

=== Fazakerley ===
Fazakerley
Party	Candidate	Votes	%	±%
Labour	Dave Hanratty	1,895	62%	
Conservative	Clare Coffey	442	15%	
Liberal Democrats	Angela Hulme	295	10%	
Fazakerley Labour	Frank Vaudrey	224	7%	
Liberal	D. Curtis	187	6%	
Majority		1,600		
Turnout		3,043		

=== Gillmoss ===
Gillmoss
Party	Candidate	Votes	%	±%
Labour	M. Black	1,317	45%	
Gillmoss Independent Labour	S. Ledwich	900	31%	
Liberal Democrats	George Mann	406	14%	
Conservative	Audrey Bowness	318	11%	
Majority		417		
Turnout		2,941		

=== Granby ===
Granby
Party	Candidate	Votes	%	±%
Labour	P. Tyrrell	1,152	54%	
Granby Labour	A. Fogg	493	23%	
Liberal Democrats	H. Priddie	287	14%	
Conservative	P. Edwards	135	6%	
Green	R. Morris	55	3%	
Majority		659		
Turnout		2,122		

=== Grassendale ===
Grassendale
Party	Candidate	Votes	%	±%
Liberal Democrats	G. Smith	3,144	64%	
Conservative	N. Liddell	995	20%	
Labour	F. Gibbons	781	16%	
Majority		2,149		
Turnout		4,920		

=== Kensington ===
Kensington
Party	Candidate	Votes	%	±%
Liberal Democrats	Jimmy Kendrick	1,685	56%	
Labour	K. Radcliffe	636	21%	
Liberal	Millicent Bickley	156	5%	
Conservative	Edna Rodick	137	5%	
Green	M. Walsh	64	2%	
Majority		1,049		
Turnout		3,027		

=== Melrose ===
Melrose 2 seats
Party	Candidate	Votes	%	±%
Labour	Frances Kidd	1,642	63%	
Labour	R. Lancaster	1,565	60%	
Melrose Labour	E. Marnell	647	25%	
Liberal Democrats	D. Parker	362	14%	
Independent Labour	A. Hincks	358	14%	
Liberal Democrats	J. Turner	327	13%	
Conservative	J. Fitzsimmons	231	9%	
Conservative	Ann Nugent	194	7%	
Majority		995		
Turnout		2,593		

=== Netherley ===
Netherley
Party	Candidate	Votes	%	±%
Labour	J. Devaney	1,071	49%	
Netherley Labour	Lesley Mahmood	624	29%	
Liberal Democrats	D. Seddon	313	14%	
Conservative	W. Dobinson	132	6%	
Green	M. Fowler	40	2%	
Majority		447		
Turnout		2,180		

=== Old Swan ===
Old Swan
Party	Candidate	Votes	%	±%
Liberal Democrats	Mary Johnston	1,232	39%	
Labour	J. Hamilton	1,008	32%	
Independent Labour	G. Lloyd	560	18%	
Conservative	G. Powell	372	12%	
Majority		224		
Turnout		3,172		

=== Picton ===
Picton
Party	Candidate	Votes	%	±%
Liberal Democrats	Richard Kemp	2,291	58%	
Labour	D. Dunphy	1,397	35%	
Conservative	Maureen Williams	149	4%	
Green	I. Gilmour	97	2%	
SDP	L. Hammacott	16	0.4%	
Majority		894		
Turnout		3,950		

=== Pirrie ===
Pirrie
Party	Candidate	Votes	%	±%
Labour	Dot Gavin	1,431	51%	
Independent Labour	F. Johnston	784	28%	
Liberal Democrats	Pamela Dutton	310	11%	
Conservative	P. Aldcroft	280	10%	
Majority		647		
Turnout		2,805		

=== St. Mary's ===
St. Mary's
Party	Candidate	Votes	%	±%
Liberal Democrats	Peter Millea	1,783	53%	
Labour	D. Hunt	795	24%	
Sitting Labour	Frank O'Donoghue	571	17%	
Conservative	G. Harden	186	6%	
SDP	Margaret Mason	21	1%	
Majority		988		
Turnout		3,356		

=== Smithdown ===
Smithdown
Party	Candidate	Votes	%	±%
Liberal Democrats	W. Barrow	1,159	48%	
Labour	Cecilia Holleran	994	41%	
Conservative	Denise O'Leary	64	3%	
Smithdown Labour	D. Bermingham	217	9%	
Majority		165		
Turnout		2,434		

=== Speke ===
Speke
Party	Candidate	Votes	%	±%
Labour	F. Anderson	1,046	53%	
Speke Independent Labour	M. Knight	486	25%	
Liberal Democrats	F. Thomas	246	13%	
Conservative	A. Fayer	184	9%	
Majority		800		
Turnout		1,962		

=== Tuebrook ===
Tuebrook
Party	Candidate	Votes	%	±%
Liberal	S. Radford	2,533	60%	
Labour	E. Burke	565	13%	
Liberal Democrats	Susan Brooks	541	13%	
Liverpool Labour	Patricia Mallon	421	10%	
Conservative	R. Bethell	162	4%	
Majority		1,968		
Turnout		4,222		

=== Valley ===
Valley
Party	Candidate	Votes	%	±%
Liberal Democrats	Ian Phillips	968	34%	
Labour	T. Smith	831	29%	
Conservative	S. Lever	206	7%	
Valley Labour	Sylvia Sharpey-Schafer	843	30%	
Majority		137		
Turnout		2,848		

=== Vauxhall ===
Vauxhall
Party	Candidate	Votes	%	±%
Labour	Paul Orr	1,044	66%	
Vauxhall Independent Labour	J. Hackett	409	26%	
Liberal Democrats	Jeremy Chowings	64	4%	
Conservative	Pauline Edwards	62	4%	
Majority		980		
Turnout		1,579		

=== Warbreck ===
Warbreck
Party	Candidate	Votes	%	±%
Liberal Democrats	Richard Roberts	1,995	47%	
Labour	B. Lawless	1,777	42%	
Conservative	Dorothy Gray	473	11%	
Majority		218		
Turnout		4,245		

=== Woolton ===
Woolton
Party	Candidate	Votes	%	±%
Conservative	J. Backhouse	2,235	43%	
Labour	j. Lusk	441	8%	
Liberal Democrats	C. Hulme	367	7%	
SDP	H. Gibson	2,157		
Majority		78		
Turnout		5,200		
