= 2000 Liverpool City Council election =

2000 UK local government election

- 4 May 2000

35 seats were up for election (one third): one seat for each of the 33 wards plus 2 by-elections 50 seats needed for a majority

Elections to Liverpool City Council were held on 4 May 2000. One third of the council was up for election and the Liberal Democrat party kept overall control of the council.

After the election, the composition of the council was:

Party	Seats	+/-
Liberal Democrat	69	+10
Labour	21	-6
Liberal	6	+1
Others	3	-2

== Election result ==
Liverpool local election result 2000
Party	Seats	Gains	Losses	Net gain/loss	Seats %	Votes %	Votes	+/−
Liberal Democrats	26			+10	74.3	54.51	36,226	▼1.52
Labour	6			-6	17.1	26.12	17,358	▼2.08
Liberal	2			+1	5.7	8.26	5,490	▲1.06
Conservative	0			0	0	5.57	3,705	▲1.63
Green	0			-3	0	1.71	1,135	▲1.09
Others	1			-2	2.9	3.83	2,545	

== Ward results ==
=== Abercromby ===
Abercromby
Party	Candidate	Votes	%	±%
Labour	Steve Mumby	758	71	
Liberal Democrats	Jeremy Wright	198	18	
Green	R. Barratt	73	7	
Conservative	G.A. Watson	45	4	
Liberal	J. Richardson	70	7	
Majority		560	53	
Turnout		1,074	10	

=== Aigburth ===
Aigburth
Party	Candidate	Votes	%	±%
Liberal Democrats	Tina Gould	1,438	54	
Labour	H. Adams	519	19	
Conservative	Alma McGing	290	11	
Green	H.J. Jago	289	11	
Alliance for Student Rights	J. Cole	20	1	
Majority		918	35	
Turnout		2,673	19	

=== Allerton ===
Allerton
Party	Candidate	Votes	%	±%
Liberal Democrats	John Clucas	1,683	61	
Labour	G. Martin	407	15	
Conservative	Mark Bill	559	20	
Green	R.Cantwell	116	4	
Majority		1,276	46	
Turnout		2,765	23	

=== Anfield ===
Anfield
Party	Candidate	Votes	%	±%
Liberal Democrats	Jeremy Chowings	986	51	
Labour	B. Williams	440	23	
Liberal	J. Cumberland	395	20	
Conservative	M. Cotterell	70	4	
Socialist Alliance	P. Filby	52	3	
Majority		546	28	
Turnout		1,943	17	

=== Arundel ===
Arundel
Party	Candidate	Votes	%	±%
Liberal Democrats	Paul Clein	935	60	
Labour	K. McNerney	403	26	
Green	Donald Ross	127	8	
Conservative	Ann Nugent	68	4	
Majority		532	34	
Turnout		1,564	14	

=== Breckfield ===
Breckfield
Party	Candidate	Votes	%	±%
Liberal Democrats	Harry Jones	690	47	
Labour	Richie Keenan	660	45	
Liberal	E. Bamford	112	8	
Majority		30	2	
Turnout		1,462	16	

=== Broadgreen ===
Broadgreen
Party	Candidate	Votes	%	±%
Liberal Democrats	Josie Mullen	1,475	62	
Labour	M. McDaid	741	31	
Liberal	C. Paton	86	4	
Conservative	Keith Sutton	87	4	
Majority		734	31	
Turnout		2,389	20	

=== Childwall ===
Childwall
Party	Candidate	Votes	%	±%
Liberal Democrats	Eddie Clein	2,478	73	
Labour	E. Reed	566	17	
Conservative	Neville Liddell	235	7	
Liberal	Francis Porter	110	3	
Majority		1,912	56	
Turnout		3,389	26	

=== Church ===
Church (2)
Party	Candidate	Votes	%	±%
Liberal Democrats	Mike Storey	3,000	78	
Liberal Democrats	Warren Bradley	2,865	74	
Labour	M. Langam	440	11	
Labour	Wendy Simon	484	13	
Conservative	Paul Harrison	209	5	
Conservative	L. Harrison	191	5	
Green	W. Byrne	273	5	
Liberal	D. Mayes	68	2	
Liberal	I. Mayes	49	1	
Majority				
Turnout				

=== Clubmoor ===
Clubmoor
Party	Candidate	Votes	%	±%
Liberal	Irene Smith	827	45	
Labour	Steve Ellison	745	40	
Liberal Democrats	John Pettitt	165	9	
Conservative	G. Hicklin	72	4	
Independent	F. Kenny	41	2	
Majority		82	5	
Turnout		1,850	18	

=== County ===
County
Party	Candidate	Votes	%	±%
Liberal Democrats	Paul Clark	1,675	76	
Labour	G. Jones	481	22	
Liberal	R.G. Webb	51	2	
Majority		1,194	54	
Turnout		2207	20	

=== Croxteth ===
Croxteth
Party	Candidate	Votes	%	±%
Liberal Democrats	Stuart Monkcom	1,923	65	
Labour	V. Moffatt	441	15	
Conservative	J. Brandwood	279	9	
Liberal	M. Booth	251	8	
Green	I. Graham	63	2	
Majority		1,482	50	
Turnout		2957	22	

=== Dingle ===
Dingle (2)
Party	Candidate	Votes	%	±%
Liberal Democrats	Peter Allen	1,221		
Liberal Democrats	Elaine Allen	1,140		
Labour	R. Bennett	601		
Labour	E. Berg	579		
Conservative	W.D. Patmore	108		
Conservative	D. Watson	83		
Green	J. Hill	111		
Green	S. Holgate	65		
Majority				
Turnout				

=== Dovecot ===
Dovecot
Party	Candidate	Votes	%	±%
Liberal Democrats	Roger Johnton	992	61	
Labour	Syvia Renilson	490	30	
Liberal	S. Hawksford	114	7	
Conservative	W. Connolly	42	3	
Majority		502	31	
Turnout		1,638	18	

=== Everton ===
Everton
Party	Candidate	Votes	%	±%
Ward Labour Party	George Knibb	543	78	
Labour	J. Murphy	149	19	
Liberal Democrats	D. Clein	55	7	
Liberal	D. Tilston	18	2	
Conservative	J. L. Perry	15	2	
Majority		396	59	
Turnout		780	16	

=== Fazakerley ===
Fazakerley
Party	Candidate	Votes	%	±%
Labour	Dave Hanratty	1,020	53	
Liberal Democrats	F. Forrester	636	33	
Liberal	E. Lye	140	7	
Ward Labour Party	Alf Flattery	127	7	
Majority		384	20	
Turnout		1,923	17	

=== Gillmoss ===
Gillmoss
Party	Candidate	Votes	%	±%
Liberal Democrats	Pam Clein	1,083	45	
Labour	Nadia Stewart	641	27	
Ward Labour Party	J. Jones	424	18	
Liberal	G.W. Booth	132	5	
Conservative	B.J. Jones	130	5	
Majority		442	18	
Turnout		2,410	17	

=== Granby ===
Granby
Party	Candidate	Votes	%	±%
Labour	S. P. Sharma	545	49	
Independent	P. Tyrell	206	19	
Liberal Democrats	M.I.Osi-Efa	197	18	
Liberal	V.A. Woodward	58	5	
Conservative	C. Hurst	58	5	
Socialist Alliance	C. Wilson	41	4	
Majority		339	30	
Turnout		1,195	13	

=== Grassendale ===
Grassendale
Party	Candidate	Votes	%	±%
Liberal Democrats	Chris Curry	2,073	63	
Labour	S.W. Owens	482	15	
Conservative	E. Williams	493	15	
Liberal	J. Moore	221	7	
Majority		1,591	48	
Turnout		3,269	27	

=== Kensington ===
Kensington
Party	Candidate	Votes	%	±%
Liberal Democrats	Jimmy Kendrick	979	62	
Labour	J. Roberts	413	26	
Conservative	Frank Dunne	79	5	
Socialist Labour	Mike Lane	77	5	
Liberal	P.B. Williams	41	2	
Majority		566	36	
Turnout		1,589	14	

=== Melrose ===
Melrose
Party	Candidate	Votes	%	±%
Labour	Joe Hanson	826	44	
Liberal Democrats	Ann Kendrick	612	33	
Ward Labour Party	Alfie Hincks	419	23	
Liberal	J. P. Woods	?	?	
Majority		214	11	
Turnout		1,857	18	

=== Netherley ===
Netherley
Party	Candidate	Votes	%	±%
Liberal Democrats	Bill Deputy	632	48	
Labour	Rosie Cooper	488	37	
Socialist Labour	D. Fogg	175	13	
Conservative	D. M. Nuttall	27	2	
Majority		144	11	
Turnout		1,322	22	

=== Old Swan ===
Old Swan
Party	Candidate	Votes	%	±%
Liberal Democrats	Bernie Turner	1,297	68	
Labour	D.J. Dunphy	436	23	
Liberal	F. Carroll	172		
Majority		861	45	
Turnout		1,905	19	

=== Picton ===
Picton
Party	Candidate	Votes	%	±%
Liberal Democrats	Richard Kemp	1,403	74	
Labour	Angela Glanville	416	22	
Conservative	G. Powell	43	2	
Green	A. Grams	38	2	
Majority		987	52	
Turnout		1,900	16	

=== Pirrie ===
Pirrie
Party	Candidate	Votes	%	±%
Labour	Dot Gavin	619	46	
Liberal Democrats	L. Sidorczuk	552	41	
Liberal	B. Woodruff	117	9	
Conservative	F.V. Stevens	69	5	
Majority		67	5	
Turnout		1,357	14	

=== St Mary's ===
St Mary's
Party	Candidate	Votes	%	±%
Liberal Democrats	Peter Millea	1,472	76	
Labour	J. P. Nolan	385	20	
Conservative	G. Harden	43	2	
Liberal	J. S. Smith	26	1	
Majority		1,976	56	
Turnout		1,926	21	

=== Smithdown ===
Smithdown
Party	Candidate	Votes	%	±%
Liberal Democrats	Juli Sames	558	55	
Labour	Richie White	391	38	
Liberal	M. A. Williams	47	5	
Conservative	K. G. Watkin	22	2	
Majority		167	17	
Turnout		1,018	11	

=== Speke ===
Speke
Party	Candidate	Votes	%	±%
Liberal Democrats	Chris Byrne	680	54	
Labour	M. Rassmussen	542	43	
Conservative	M. Williams	30	2	
Majority		138	11	
Turnout		1,252	19	

=== Tuebrook ===
Tuebrook
Party	Candidate	Votes	%	±%
Liberal	Steve Radford	2,215	85	
Labour	B.A.McGrath	247	9	
Liberal Democrats	J. Colon	83	3	
Conservative	A. Bowness	64	2	
Majority		1,968	74	
Turnout		2,609	22	

=== Valley ===
Valley
Party	Candidate	Votes	%	±%
Liberal Democrats	I. Phillips	1,104	72	
Labour	Nick Small	357	23	
Conservative	J. Larossa	46	3	
Liberal	K. Woodward	24	2	
Majority		747	49	
Turnout		1,531	21	

=== Vauxhall ===
Vauxhall
Party	Candidate	Votes	%	±%
Labour	Pat Holleran	799	61	
Independent Labour	Paul Orr	420	32	
Liberal Democrats	M. Chivers	54	4	
Liberal	J.K. Prescott	26	2	
Conservative	J. Watson	7	1	
Majority		379	29	
Turnout		1,306	23	

=== Warbeck ===
Warbreck
Party	Candidate	Votes	%	±%
Liberal Democrats	Richard Roberts	1,521	66	
Labour	L. Hughes	579	25	
Conservative	E.J. Nash	104	5	
Liberal	C. Mayes	91	4	
Majority		942	41	
Turnout		2,295	16	

=== Woolton ===
Woolton
Party	Candidate	Votes	%	±%
Liberal Democrats	Malcolm Kelly	2,484	73	
Conservative	D.T. Nuttall	432	13	
Labour	S. Kenwright	320	9	
Liberal	M. Langley	87	3	
Green	J.M. Brown	68	2	
Majority		2,052	60	
Turnout		3,391	28	
