= 1990 Liverpool City Council election =

1990 UK local government election

- 3 May 1990

33 seats were up for election (one third): one seat for each of the 33 wards 50 seats needed for a majority

Elections to Liverpool City Council were held on 3 May 1990. One third of the council was up for election and the Labour Party kept overall control of the council.

After the election, the composition of the council was:

Party	Seats	±
Labour	??	??
Liberal Democrat	??	??
Liberal Party	??	??
Independent	??	??
Others	??	??

== Election results ==
Liverpool local election result 1990
Party	Seats	Gains	Losses	Net gain/loss	Seats %	Votes %	Votes	+/−
Labour	27			27	82%	56%	93,575	
Liberal Democrats	6			6	18%	33%	54,441	
Conservative	1			1	3%	7%	12,214	
Green	0			0	0%	3%	4,725	
Communist	0			0	0%	0.1%	213	
Democratic Anti Poll Tax	0			0	0%	0.04%	70	

== Ward results ==
=== Abercromby ===
Abercromby 2 seats
Party	Candidate	Votes	%	±%
Labour	K. Hackett	1,802	73%	▲3%
Labour	Sarah Norman	1,745	71%	▲1%
Green	Laura Davenport	277	11%	N/A
Liberal Democrats	Jeremy Chowings	145	6%	▼11%
Liberal Democrats	Nigel Dyer	134	5%	▲12%
Conservative	Pauline Edwards	127	5%	Steady
Conservative	D. Radcliffe	114	5%	Steady
Communist	F. Carroll	107	4%	▲1%
Majority		1,525		
Registered electors				
Turnout		2,458		
Labour hold		Swing	▲3%	
Labour hold		Swing	▲1%	

As there were two vacancies for this seat, in order to allow comparison, only the votes for the highest scoring candidate for each party have been used to compile the statistics.

=== Aigburth ===
Aigburth
Party	Candidate	Votes	%	±%
Liberal Democrats	Douglas McKittrick	2,778	46%	
Labour	R. Parkinson	2,151	36%	
Conservative	N.W. Liddell	662	11%	
Green	Joanne Cook	409	7%	
Majority		672		
Turnout		6,000		

=== Allerton ===
Allerton
Party	Candidate	Votes	%	±%
Liberal Democrats	Flo Clucas	2,750	44%	
Labour	K. E. Neary	2,236	36%	
Conservative	P. Lee	942	15%	
Green	R. E. Cantwell	228	4%	
SDP	R. E. Gould	135	2%	
Majority		514		
Turnout		6,291		

=== Anfield ===
Anfield
Party	Candidate	Votes	%	±%
Labour	S. H. Oldfield	3,365	57%	
Liberal Democrats	Veronica Best	2,319	39%	
Conservative	J. Mass	240	4%	
Majority		1,047		
Turnout		5,923		

=== Arundel ===
Arundel
Party	Candidate	Votes	%	±%
Labour	A. Duckworth	2,234	47%	
Liberal Democrats	Mary Johnston	1,700	36%	
Conservative	D. W. Patmore	295	6%	
Green	G. Thomson	482	10%	
Democratic Anti Poll Tax	D. E. Huish	70	1%	
Majority		534		
Turnout		4,781		

=== Breckfield ===
Breckfield
Party	Candidate	Votes	%	±%
Labour	Frank Prendergast	3,238	80%	
Liberal Democrats	Karen Afford	581	14%	
Conservative	Elizabeth Bayley	210	5%	
Majority		2,657		
Turnout		4,029		

=== Broadgreen ===
Broadgreen
Party	Candidate	Votes	%	±%
Labour	Tony Concepcion	3,489	54%	
Liberal Democrats	G. B. Smith	2,519	39%	
Conservative	M. Lind	310	5%	
Green	B. Turner	171	3%	
Majority		970		
Turnout		6,489		

=== Childwall ===
Childwall
Party	Candidate	Votes	%	±%
Liberal Democrats	Lady Doreen Jones	3,565	52%	
Labour	N.D. Fleet	2,022	29%	
Conservative	Helen Rigby	939	14%	
Green	M. S. Hughes	332	5%	
Majority		1,543		
Turnout		6,858		

=== Church ===
Church
Party	Candidate	Votes	%	±%
Liberal Democrats	Len Tyrer	4,203	58%	
Labour	E. Taylor	1,812	25%	
Conservative	I. Bishop	911	13%	
Green	A. G. Maxwell	316	4%	
Majority		2,391		
Turnout		7,253		

=== Clubmoor ===
Clubmoor
Party	Candidate	Votes	%	±%
Labour	K. Noon	3,909	73%	
Liberal Democrats	Hilary Owen	869	16%	
Conservative	Paula Denovan	338	6%	
Green	Joan Best	165	3%	
Communist	K. F. McDonough	106	2%	
Majority		3,040		
Turnout		5,387		

=== County ===
County
Party	Candidate	Votes	%	±%
Labour	Margaret McDaid	3,249	49%	
Liberal Democrats	Sybil Brookes	3,216	49%	
Conservative	J. F. Atkinson	115	2%	
SDP	Joan Sewell	37	1%	
Majority		33		
Turnout		6,617		

=== Croxteth ===
Croxteth
Party	Candidate	Votes	%	±%
Liberal Democrats	Gillian Bundred	3,682	53%	
Labour	J. Mooney	2,379	34%	
Conservative	G. E. Brandwood	656	9%	
Green	?	186	3%	
SDP	Marie Killen	46	1%	
Majority		1,303		
Turnout		6,949		

=== Dingle ===
Dingle
Party	Candidate	Votes	%	±%
Labour	Joan Brown	3,612	74%	
Liberal Democrats	S. P. Boddy	860	18%	
Conservative	R. D. Knox	189	4%	
Green	R. Spalding	224	5%	
Majority		2,752		
Turnout		4,885		

=== Dovecot ===
Dovecot
Party	Candidate	Votes	%	±%
Labour	I. H. Scott	2,984	75%	
Liberal Democrats	Norman Mills	746	19%	
Conservative	W. H. Connolly	261	7%	
Majority		2,238		
Turnout		3,991		

=== Everton ===
Everton
Party	Candidate	Votes	%	±%
Labour	G. A. Allen	1,895	94%	
Liberal Democrats	J.S. Thomson	128	6%	
Majority		1,767		
Turnout		2,023		

=== Fazakerley ===
Fazakerley
Party	Candidate	Votes	%	±%
Labour	J. Brazier	3,743	77%	
Liberal Democrats	J. J. Johnston	782	16%	
Conservative	G. Breckell	355	7%	
Majority		2,961		
Turnout		4,880		

=== Gillmoss ===
Gillmoss
Party	Candidate	Votes	%	±%
Labour	Tony Jennings	3,479	78%	
Liberal Democrats	George Mann	526	12%	
Conservative	S. North	255	6%	
Green	Susan Ellison	183	4%	
Majority		2,953		
Turnout		4,443		

=== Granby ===
Granby
Party	Candidate	Votes	%	±%
Labour	Gideon Ben-Tovim	2,633	80%	
Liberal Democrats	H. Priddie	282	9%	
Conservative	Henrietta Edwards	150	5%	
Green	W. Jenkins	180	5%	
?	?	61	2%	
Majority		2,351		
Turnout		3,306		

=== Grassendale ===
Grassendale
Party	Candidate	Votes	%	±%
Liberal Democrats	Beatrice Fraenkel	3,994	62%	
Labour	D. Dunphy	1,358	21%	
Conservative	Audrey Ogden	858	13%	
Green	E. Goldsmith	278	4%	
Majority		2,636		
Turnout		6,488		

=== Kensington ===
Kensington
Party	Candidate	Votes	%	±%
Labour	Ann Keenan	2,438	50%	
Liberal Democrats	Frank Doran	2,344	48%	
Conservative	R. Bethell	93	2%	
SDP	Joan Reece	40	1%	
Majority		94		
Turnout		4,915		

=== Melrose ===
Melrose
Party	Candidate	Votes	%	±%
Labour	Dawn Booth	4,146	84%	
Liberal Democrats	D. Parker	619	13%	
Conservative	Anne Nugent	175	4%	
Majority		3,527		
Turnout		4,940		

=== Netherley ===
Netherley
Party	Candidate	Votes	%	±%
Labour	Catherine Wilson	2,373	84%	
Liberal Democrats	J. Clein	316	11%	
Conservative	W. Dobinson	123	4%	
Majority		2,057		
Turnout		2,812		

=== Old Swan ===
Old Swan
Party	Candidate	Votes	%	±%
Labour	K. Williams	3,342	64%	
Liberal Democrats	J. Berman	1,190	23%	
Conservative	G. Powell	465	9%	
Green	I. Gilmour	217	4%	
Majority		2,152		
Turnout		5,214		

=== Picton ===
Picton
Party	Candidate	Votes	%	±%
Labour	Susan Hogan	3,057	53%	
Liberal Democrats	H. Heritty	2,214	38%	
Green	J. Hulton	287	5%	
Conservative	K. Watkin	163	3%	
SDP	L. Devereux	49	1%	
Majority		843		
Turnout		5,770		

=== Pirrie ===
Pirrie
Party	Candidate	Votes	%	±%
Labour	W. Edwards	3,948	82%	
Liberal Democrats	Maureen Doran	606	13%	
Conservative	P. Aldcroft	234	5%	
Majority		3,342		
Turnout		4,788		

=== St. Mary's ===
St. Mary's
Party	Candidate	Votes	%	±%
Labour	J. Doyle	3,008	55%	
Liberal Democrats	Peter Millea	2,115	39%	
Conservative	A. Fayer	196	4%	
Green	Lucy Williams	107	2%	
Majority		893		
Turnout		5,426		

=== Smithdown ===
Smithdown
Party	Candidate	Votes	%	±%
Labour	Juliet Herzog	2,632	67%	
Liberal Democrats	P. McGrath	1,093	28%	
Conservative	Denise O'Leary	96	2%	
Green	J. Stevenson	84	2%	
Majority		1,539		
Turnout		3,905		

=== Speke ===
Speke
Party	Candidate	Votes	%	±%
Labour	K. Cannon	2,789	85%	
Liberal Democrats	Victoria Clein	305	9%	
Conservative	G. Harden	194	6%	
Majority		2,484		
Turnout		3,288		

=== Tuebrook ===
Tuebrook
Party	Candidate	Votes	%	±%
Labour	Anne Gorton	2,629	47%	
Liberal Democrats	N. Cardwell	2,537	45%	
Conservative	Edna Rodick	262	5%	
Green	R. Morris	167	3%	
Majority		92		
Turnout		5,595		

=== Valley ===
Valley
Party	Candidate	Votes	%	±%
Labour	Frank Ruse	2,799	75%	
Liberal Democrats	Kay Brown	485	13%	
Conservative	S. Lever	241	6%	
Green	A. Willan	224	6%	
Majority		2,314		
Turnout		3,749		

=== Vauxhall ===
Vauxhall
Party	Candidate	Votes	%	±%
Labour	W. Snell	2,320	95%	
Liberal Democrats	B. Grocott	80	3%	
Conservative	R. Fairclough	49	2%	
Majority		2,240		
Turnout		2,449		

=== Warbreck ===
Warbreck
Party	Candidate	Votes	%	±%
Labour	G. Hughes	3,617	53%	
Liberal Democrats	Richard Roberts	2,957	43%	
Conservative	Dorothy Gray	268	4%	
Majority		660		
Turnout		6,842		

=== Woolton ===
Woolton
Party	Candidate	Votes	%	±%
Conservative	S. Fitzsimmons	1,831	29%	
Liberal Democrats	B. Brown	1,802	29%	
Labour	A. Gallagher	1,142	18%	
Green	?	208	3%	
Majority		29		
Turnout		6,280		
