= 1963 Liverpool City Council election =

1963 UK local election

← 1962	9 May 1963	1964 →
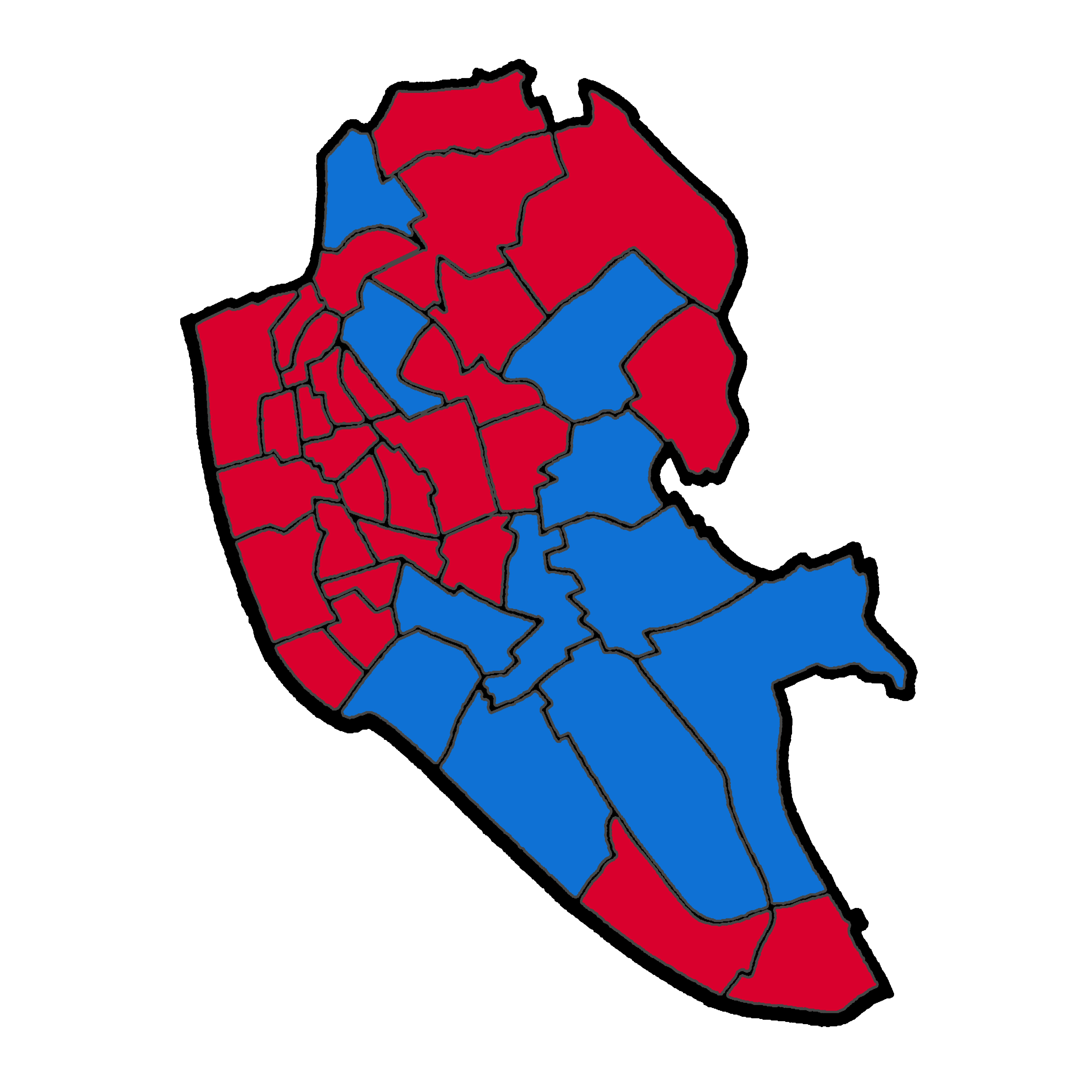
- Map of Liverpool showing wards won (first placed party)

Elections to Liverpool City Council were held on 9 May 1963.

After the election, the composition of the council was:

Party	Councillors	±	Aldermen	Total
Conservative	43	-13	25	68
Labour	72	+15	14	86
Protestant	3	-1	0	3
Liberal	2	0	1	3

== Election result ==
Liverpool local election result 1963
Party	Seats	Gains	Losses	Net gain/loss	Seats %	Votes %	Votes	+/−
Conservative	11	0	13	-13	27%	37%	64,442	
Labour	30	15	0	+15	73%	50%	87,751	
Liberal	0	0	0	0	0%	12%	20,973	
Protestant	0	0	2	-2	0%	1.5%	2,621	
Communist	0	0	0	0	0%	0.60%	1,053	
British Union Movement	0	0	0	0	0%	1.2%	2,052	
Anti-debt	0	0	0	0	0%	0.16%	289	

== Ward results ==
* - Councillor seeking re-election

^{(PARTY)} - Party of former Councillor

The Councillors seeking re-election at this election were elected in 1960 for a three-year term, therefore comparisons are made with the 1960 election results.

=== Abercromby ===
Abercromby
Party	Candidate	Votes	%	±%
Labour	L. Caplan	1,792	64%	+22%
Conservative	R. W. Rollins ^{(PARTY)}	873	31%	−18%
Communist	A. M^{c}Clelland	139	5%	+1%
Majority		919		
Registered electors		9,353		
Turnout		2,804	30%	+9%
Labour gain from Conservative		Swing		

=== Aigburth ===
Aigburth
Party	Candidate	Votes	%	±%
Conservative	S. Cotton ^{(PARTY)}	3,655	63%	−30%
Liberal	Mrs. A. Dyson	1,548	27%	+27%
Labour	T. Bailey	431	7%	0%
Majority		2,107		
Registered electors		13,591		
Turnout		5,756	42%	+10%
Conservative hold		Swing		

=== Allerton ===
Allerton
Party	Candidate	Votes	%	±%
Conservative	D. K. Williams ^{(PARTY)}	2,481	55%	−32%
Liberal	A. G. Wilson	1,286	29%	+29%
Labour	G. C. Corner	599	13%	0%
Anti-debt	F. G. Connor	117	3%	+3%
Majority		1,205		
Registered electors		10,032		
Turnout		4,493	45%	+15%
Conservative hold		Swing		

=== Anfield ===
Anfield
Party	Candidate	Votes	%	±%
Conservative	R. G. Semple ^{(PARTY)}	2,741	45%	−35%
Labour	S. W. Jones	2,396	40%	+10%
Liberal	G. W. Ryder	907	15%	+15%
Majority		345		
Registered electors		13,962		
Turnout		6,044	43%	+10%
Conservative hold		Swing		

=== Arundel ===
Arundel
Party	Candidate	Votes	%	±%
Conservative	P. W. Rathbone *	2,278	42	−22
Labour	C. Taylor	2,164	40	−18
Liberal	Isaac Gottlieb	850	16	+5
Communist	J. Kay	82	2	−1
Majority		114		
Registered electors		12,476		
Turnout		5,374	43	+11
Conservative hold		Swing		

=== Breckfield ===
Breckfield
Party	Candidate	Votes	%	±%
Labour	L. Williams	2,435	59%	+20%
Conservative	W. A. Lowe *	1,663	41%	−20%
Majority		772		
Registered electors		10,876		
Turnout		4,098	38%	+9%
Labour gain from Conservative		Swing		

=== Broadgreen ===
Broadgreen
Party	Candidate	Votes	%	±%
Conservative	J. Keenan *	2,046	50%	−26%
Labour	T. Graves	1,196	29%	+5%
Liberal	W. M. Galbraith	837	21%	+21%
Majority		850		
Registered electors		11,223		
Turnout		4,079	36%	+7%
Conservative hold		Swing		

=== Central ===
Central
Party	Candidate	Votes	%	±%
Labour	W. McKeown *	unopposed		
Registered electors		8,441		
Labour hold		Swing		

=== Childwall ===
Childwall
Party	Candidate	Votes	%	±%
Conservative	S. Airey ^{(PARTY)}	3,491	50	−24
Liberal	Albert Globe	2,608	37	+17
Labour	J. Dalrymple	865	12	+5
Majority		883		
Registered electors		16,657		
Turnout		6,964	42	+10
Conservative hold		Swing		

=== Church ===
Church
Party	Candidate	Votes	%	±%
Conservative	E. W. Holland ^{(PARTY)}	3,029	48%	−12%
Liberal	G. A. Gerrard	2,832	45%	+11%
Labour	W. Lungley	416	7%	
Majority		197		
Registered electors		13,448		
Turnout		6,277	47%	+8%
Conservative hold		Swing		

=== Clubmoor ===
Clubmoor
Party	Candidate	Votes	%	±%
Labour	R. Buckle	2,937	54	+18
Conservative	E. Johnson ^{(PARTY)}	1,519	35	−29
Liberal	Ron Smith	631	11	+11
Majority		1,018		
Registered electors		11,110		
Turnout		5,487	49	+14
Labour gain from Conservative		Swing		

=== County ===
County
Party	Candidate	Votes	%	±%
Labour	B. Deane	3,316	57%	+12%
Conservative	A. H. Maynard *	2,529	43%	−12%
Majority		787		
Registered electors		13,335		
Turnout		5,845	44%	+2%
Labour gain from Conservative		Swing		

=== Croxteth ===
Croxteth
Party	Candidate	Votes	%	±%
Conservative	A. L. Audley ^{(PARTY)}	2,810	51%	−26%
Liberal	J. H. Aspinall	1,473	27%	+18%
Labour	W. F. Burke	1,268	23%	+9%
Majority		1,337		
Registered electors		11,497		
Turnout		5,551	48%	+10%
Conservative hold		Swing		

=== Dingle ===
Dingle
Party	Candidate	Votes	%	±%
Labour	D. Cumella *	2,946	67%	+16%
Conservative	C. J. C. Burgess	1,045	24%	−13%
Liberal	E. Royal	390	9%	−3%
Majority		1,901		
Registered electors		12,007		
Turnout		4,381	36%	+4%
Labour hold		Swing		

=== Dovecot ===
Dovecot
Party	Candidate	Votes	%	±%
Labour	W. I. Davies	3,116	62%	
Conservative	T. Hillock	1,135	23%	
Liberal	P. J. Goddard	759	15%	
Majority		1,981		
Registered electors		14,134		
Turnout		5,010	35%	
Labour gain from		Swing		

=== Everton ===
Everton
Party	Candidate	Votes	%	±%
Labour	S. F. Jacobs *	1,738	75%	
Conservative	E. Shaw	522	22%	−15%
Communist	Miss E. M. Shelbourne	68	3%	+3%
Majority		1,216		
Registered electors		9,705		
Turnout		2,328	24%	+6%
Labour hold		Swing		

=== Fairfield ===
Fairfield
Party	Candidate	Votes	%	±%
Labour	J. Guinan	2,015	52%	+24%
Conservative	W. Thomas *	1,746	45%	−27%
British Union Movement	G. Gabrielson	83	2%	+2%
Majority		269		
Registered electors		13,397		
Turnout		3,844	29%	+8%
Labour hold		Swing		

=== Fazakerley ===
Fazakerley
Party	Candidate	Votes	%	±%
Labour	J. Woolwich	2,754	51%	+15%
Conservative	C. N. Peplow	2,674	49%	−15%
Majority		80		
Registered electors		11,180		
Turnout		5,428	49%	+12%
Labour hold		Swing		

=== Gillmoss ===
Gillmoss
Party	Candidate	Votes	%	±%
Labour	J. F. Stevens ^{(PARTY)}	3,888	68%	+7%
Conservative	J. Swainbank	867	15%	−24%
Liberal	R. Grundy	711	12%	+12%
Communist	F. J. Marsh	223	4%	+4%
Majority		3,021		
Registered electors		15,770		
Turnout		5,689	36%	+11%
Labour hold		Swing		

=== Granby ===
Granby
Party	Candidate	Votes	%	±%
Labour	Mrs. M. B. Simey	2,253	58%	+9%
Conservative	A. Lloyd *	1,442	37%	−14%
Communist	J. Melia	166	4%	+4%
Majority		811		
Registered electors		11,117		
Turnout		3,861	35%	+9%
Labour gain from Conservative		Swing		

=== Kensington ===
Kensington
Party	Candidate	Votes	%	±%
Labour	T. K. Williams *	2,718	67%	+17%
Conservative	K. W. Davies	1,203	29%	−21%
British Union Movement	T. G. Kenny	162	4%	+4%
Majority		1,515		
Registered electors		11,824		
Turnout		4,083	35%	+5%
Labour hold		Swing		

=== Low Hill ===
Low Hill
Party	Candidate	Votes	%	±%
Labour	G. M. Scott *	1,964	75%	+21%
Conservative	D. E. Daniel	570	22%	−24%
British Union Movement	M. J. Ward	74	3%	+3%
Majority		1,394		
Registered electors		9,193		
Turnout		2,608	28%	+2%
Labour hold		Swing		

=== Melrose ===
Melrose
Party	Candidate	Votes	%	±%
Labour	C. H. Brown *	1,933	73%	+17%
Conservative	S. D. Lunt	704	27%	−5%
Majority		1,229		
Registered electors		9,314		
Turnout		2,637	28%	+4%
Labour hold		Swing		

=== Netherfield ===
Netherfield
Party	Candidate	Votes	%	±%
Labour	N. S. Barnett	1,326	57%	+13%
Protestant	R. F. Goll ^{(PARTY)}	1,007	43%	−13%
Majority		319		
Registered electors		7,597		
Turnout		2,333	31%	+4%
Labour gain from Protestant		Swing		

=== Old Swan ===
Old Swan
Party	Candidate	Votes	%	±%
Labour	S. G. Thorne	2,683	48%	+16%
Conservative	R. H. Morris *	2,120	38%	−26%
Liberal	D. Kearon	749	13%	+13%
Majority		563		
Registered electors		14,555		
Turnout		5,552	38%	+11%
Labour gain from Conservative		Swing		

=== Picton ===
Picton
Party	Candidate	Votes	%	±%
Labour	C. J. Minton	2,846	52%	+8%
Conservative	N. F. Derrick ^{(PARTY)}	1,825	33%	−23%
Liberal	F. F. W. Barton	796	15%	+15%
Majority		1,021		
Registered electors		13,637		
Turnout		5,467	40%	−7%
Labour gain from Conservative		Swing		

=== Pirrie ===
Pirrie
Party	Candidate	Votes	%	±%
Labour	Eric Heffer *	4,789	70%	+18%
Conservative	Mrs. M. E. Jones	2,075	30%	−18%
Majority		2,714		
Registered electors		16,218		
Turnout		6,864	42%	+7%
Labour hold		Swing		

=== Prince's Park ===
Prince's Park
Party	Candidate	Votes	%	±%
Labour	F. H. Cain	2,636	61%	+13%
Conservative	G. Clark *	1,277	29%	−23%
Liberal	A. Garland	428	10%	+10%
Majority		1,359		
Registered electors		12,778		
Turnout		4,341	34%	+8%
Labour gain from Conservative		Swing		

=== Sandhills ===
Sandhills
Party	Candidate	Votes	%	±%
Labour	J. Scully *	2,372	91%	+1%
Communist	B. Campbell	133	5%	+5%
Conservative	N. Heywood	100	4%	−6%
Majority		2,239		
Registered electors		7,829		
Turnout		2,605	33%	+13%
Labour hold		Swing		

=== St. Domingo ===
St. Domingo
Party	Candidate	Votes	%	±%
Labour	F. Keating	2,274	57%	+11%
Protestant	W. H. Blower	1,614	40%	−14%
Communist	W. C. Doherty	105	3%	+3%
Majority		660		
Registered electors		11,579		
Turnout		3,993	34%	+5%
Labour gain from Protestant		Swing		

=== St. James ===
St. James 2 seats
Party	Candidate	Votes	%	±%
Labour	T. McManus *	2,322	79%	+5%
Labour	R. Parry ^{(PARTY)}	1,759	60%	−14%
Conservative	G. Boult	612	21%	−5%
Majority		1,710		
Registered electors		10,222		
Turnout		2,934	29%	+10%
Labour hold		Swing		
Labour hold		Swing		

=== St. Mary's ===
St. Mary's
Party	Candidate	Votes	%	±%
Labour	P. Gunnell	2,424	53%	+6%
Conservative	J. A. Nolan *	1,646	36%	−17%
Liberal	S. Levy	496	11%	+11%
Majority		778		
Registered electors		10,801		
Turnout		4,556	42%	+11%
Labour gain from Conservative		Swing	16%	

=== St. Michael's ===
St. Michael's
Party	Candidate	Votes	%	±%
Conservative	E. Stanley Nixon ^{(PARTY)}	2,111	44	−23
Liberal	Jack F. Ross	1,749	36	+19
Labour	A. Fowler	889	19	+6
Anti-debt	A. P. Cooney	50	1	+1
Majority		362		
Registered electors		9,931		
Turnout		4,799	48%	+14
Conservative hold		Swing		

=== Smithdown ===
Smithdown
Party	Candidate	Votes	%	±%
Labour	W. Gibbs *	2,187	74%	+6%
Conservative	T. J. Strange	663	22%	−10%
British Union Movement	R. J. Williams	119	4%	+4%
Majority		1,524		
Registered electors		11,632		
Turnout		2,969	26%	+8%
Labour hold		Swing		

=== Speke ===
Speke
Party	Candidate	Votes	%	±%
Labour	W. H. Sefton	2,847	81%	
Conservative	B. F. Evans	652	19%	
Majority		2,195		
Registered electors		13,806		
Turnout		3,499	25%	

=== Tuebrook ===
Tuebrook
Party	Candidate	Votes	%	±%
Labour	H. Dailey	2,693	54%	+19%
Conservative	E. F. Pine *	2,269	46%	−19%
Majority		424		
Registered electors		12,470		
Turnout		4,962	40%	+8%
Labour gain from Conservative		Swing		

=== Vauxhall ===
Vauxhall
Party	Candidate	Votes	%	±%
Labour	J. A. Gallagher ^{(PARTY)}	2,846	95%	+18%
Communist	T. E. Cassin	137	5%	−18%
Majority		2,709		
Registered electors		9,462		
Turnout		2,983	32%	+23%
Labour hold		Swing		

=== Warbreck ===
Warbreck
Party	Candidate	Votes	%	±%
Conservative	R. J. McLaughlin *	2,507	56%	−17%
Labour	J. V. Grue	1,936	44%	+17%
Majority		571		
Registered electors		12,555		
Turnout		4,443	35%	+3%
Conservative hold		Swing		

=== Westminster ===
Westminster
Party	Candidate	Votes	%	±%
Labour	J. Dunn	1,699	60%	+13%
Conservative	J. Gillin *	1,152	40%	−13%
Majority		547		
Registered electors		4,239		
Turnout		2,851	39%	+6%
Labour gain from Conservative		Swing		

=== Woolton ===
Woolton
Party	Candidate	Votes	%	±%
Conservative	J. McAllister *	4.000	50%	−30%
Labour	S. J. Cook	2,083	26%	+6%
Liberal	R. S. Hale	1,923	24%	+24%
Majority		1,917		
Registered electors		17,432		
Turnout		8,006	46%	+19%
Conservative hold		Swing		
