= 1965 Liverpool City Council election =

1965 UK local election

← 1964	13 May 1965	1966 →
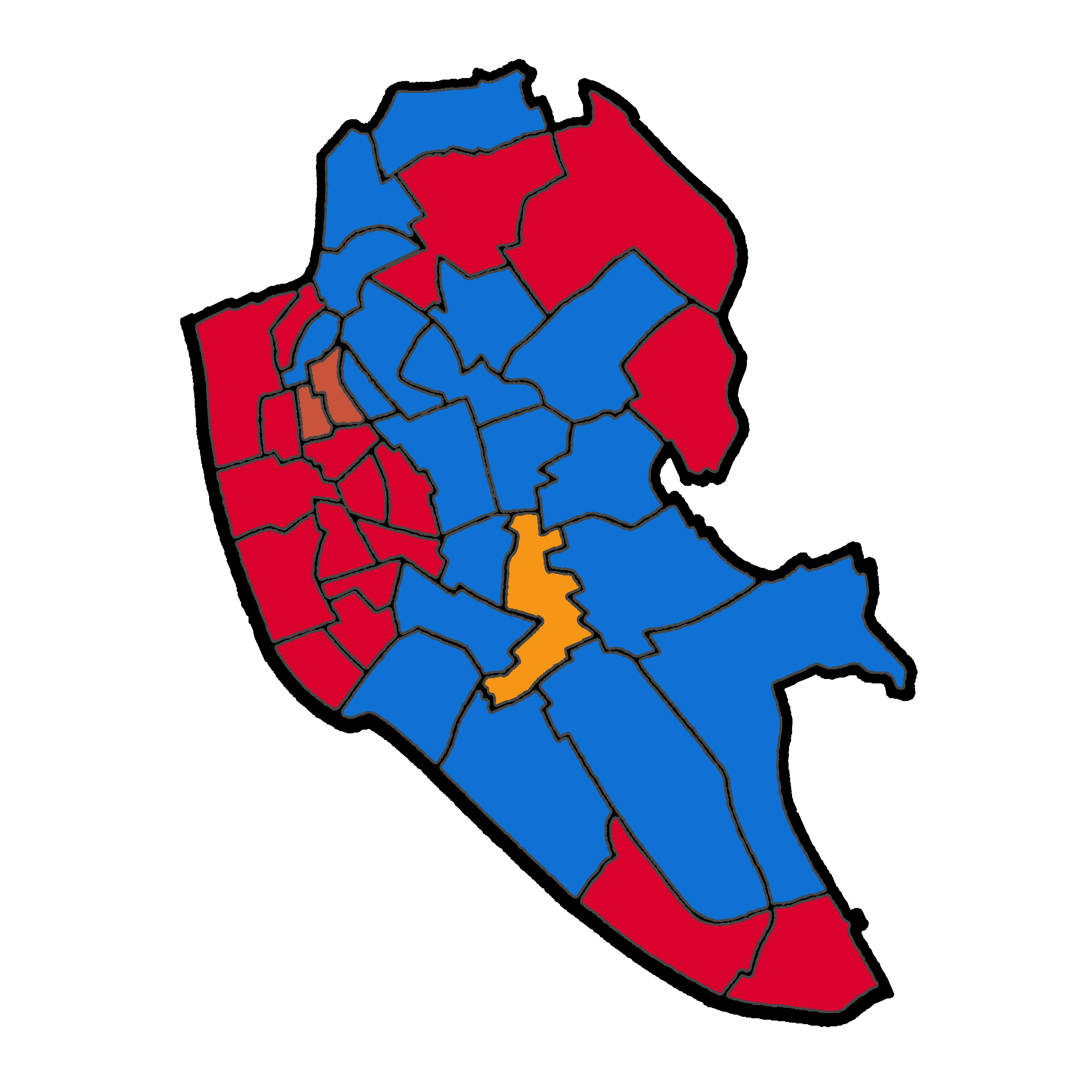
- Map of Liverpool showing wards won (first placed party)

Elections to Liverpool City Council were held on 13 May 1965.

After the election, the composition of the council was:

Party	Councillors	±	Aldermen
Conservative	44	+9	??
Labour	72	-9	??
Protestant	3	+1	??
Liberal	1	-1	??

== Election result ==
Liverpool local election result 1965
Party	Seats	Gains	Losses	Net gain/loss	Seats %	Votes %	Votes	+/−
Conservative	20	9	0	+9	49%	53%	74,531	
Labour	18	0	9	-9	44%	39%	54,209	
Liberal	1	0	1	-1	2.5%	5.5%	7,672	
Protestant	2	1	0	+1	4.9%	1.5%	2,159	
Communist	0	0	0	0	0%	0.66%	928	

== Ward results ==
* - Councillor seeking re-election

^{(PARTY)} - Party of former Councillor

The Councillors seeking re-election at this election were elected in 1962 for a three-year term, therefore comparisons are made with the 1962 election results.

=== Abercromby ===
Abercromby
Party	Candidate	Votes	%	±%
Labour	F. Gaier ^{(PARTY)}	1,017	58%	−8%
Conservative	C. Hughes	637	37%	+8%
Communist	A. M^{c}Clelland	88	5%	0%
Majority		380		
Registered electors		8,596		
Turnout		1,742	20%	−6%
Labour hold		Swing		

=== Aigburth ===
Aigburth
Party	Candidate	Votes	%	±%
Conservative	W. N. Venmore *	4,229	80%	−7%
Liberal	J. S. Roddick	623	12%	+12%
Labour	G. Bramwell	464	9%	−4%
Majority		3,606		
Registered electors		13,772		
Turnout		5,316	39%	+3%
Conservative hold		Swing		

=== Allerton ===
Allerton
Party	Candidate	Votes	%	±%
Conservative	W. S. D. Weaver *	2,698	69%	−4%
Liberal	M. J. Mumford	749	19%	+19%
Labour	S. A. Roberts	461	12%	−15%
Majority		1,949		
Registered electors		9,985		
Turnout		3,908	39%	−6%
Conservative hold		Swing		

=== Anfield ===
Anfield
Party	Candidate	Votes	%	±%
Conservative	R. F. Craine *	3,361	67%	+8%
Labour	S. W. Jones	1,663	33%	−8%
Majority		1,698		
Registered electors		13,500		
Turnout		5,024	37%	+1%
Conservative hold		Swing		

=== Arundel ===
Arundel
Party	Candidate	Votes	%	±%
Conservative	C. Price *	2,598	63%	+22%
Labour	Mrs. G. J. Mathison	1,405	34%	0%
Communist	J. Kay	111	3%	+1%
Majority		1,193		
Registered electors		11,928		
Turnout		4,114	34%	−8%
Conservative hold		Swing		

=== Breckfield ===
Breckfield
Party	Candidate	Votes	%	±%
Conservative	J. K. Tanner	1,523	54%	+7%
Labour	J. E. Burns *	1,285	46%	−7%
Majority		238		
Registered electors		10,443		
Turnout		2,808	27%	−7%
Conservative gain from Labour		Swing		

=== Broadgreen ===
Broadgreen
Party	Candidate	Votes	%	±%
Conservative	F. J. Bullen *	2,438	63%	+18%
Labour	F. Johnton	988	26%	0%
Liberal	G. W. Ryder	446	12%	−17%
Majority		1,450		
Registered electors		10,936		
Turnout		3,872	35%	+1%
Conservative hold		Swing		

=== Central ===
Central 2 seats
Party	Candidate	Votes	%	±%
Labour	J. Cullen *	1,158	54%	−12%
Conservative	B. V. Groombridge	973	46%	+12%
Labour	G. J. Maudsley	917	43%	−23%
Conservative	Dr. T. L. Hobday	915	43%	+9%
Majority		185		
Registered electors		7,893		
Turnout		2,131	27%	−5%
Labour hold		Swing		
Conservative gain from Labour		Swing		

=== Childwall ===
Childwall
Party	Candidate	Votes	%	±%
Conservative	C. G. Pascoe ^{(PARTY)}	4,371	71%	+20%
Liberal	J. Aspinwall	991	16%	−21%
Labour	I. Edwards	763	12%	+1%
Communist	A. B. Williams	74	1%	+1%
Majority		3,380		
Registered electors		17,377		
Turnout		6,199	36%	−1%
Conservative hold		Swing		

=== Church ===
Church
Party	Candidate	Votes	%	±%
Liberal	Cyril E. Carr *	3,291	50%	−3%
Conservative	V. Burke	2,878	44%	+3%
Labour	A. Doswell	398	6%	0%
Majority		413		
Registered electors		13,758		
Turnout		6,567	48%	−1%
Liberal hold		Swing		

=== Clubmoor ===
Clubmoor
Party	Candidate	Votes	%	±%
Conservative	G. McKelvie	2,346	56%	+16%
Labour	F. Grue *	1,815	44%	−3%
Majority		531		
Registered electors		10,787		
Turnout		4,161	39%	−5%
Conservative gain from Labour		Swing		

=== County ===
County
Party	Candidate	Votes	%	±%
Conservative	R. B. Flude	2,864	56%	+10%
Labour	J. McLean ^{(PARTY)}	2,229	44%	−10%
Majority		635		
Registered electors		12,695		
Turnout		5,093	40%	−2%
Conservative gain from Labour		Swing		

=== Croxteth ===
Croxteth
Party	Candidate	Votes	%	±%
Conservative	C. Dickinson *	3,683	72%	+1%
Labour	A. P. Lee	1,017	20%	−9%
Liberal	J. B. Kellett	439	9%	+9%
Majority		2,666		
Registered electors		11,695		
Turnout		5,139	44%	+7%
Conservative hold		Swing		

=== Dingle ===
Dingle
Party	Candidate	Votes	%	±%
Labour	Mrs. C. A. George ^{(PARTY)}	1,753	55%	−5%
Conservative	Dr. H. G. Prince	1,457	45%	+15%
Majority		296		
Registered electors		11,281		
Turnout		3,210	28%	−5%
Labour hold		Swing		

=== Dovecot ===
Dovecot
Party	Candidate	Votes	%	±%
Labour	W. P. Johnson *	2,092	54%	0%
Conservative	E. G. Sowerbutts	1,800	46%	
Majority		292		
Registered electors		14,080		
Turnout		3,892	28%	−10%
Labour hold		Swing		

=== Everton ===
Everton
Party	Candidate	Votes	%	±%
Labour	W. Smyth *	905	63%	−9%
Conservative	I. D. McGaw	445	31%	+9%
Communist	A. Quire	80	6%	+3%
Majority		460		
Registered electors		8,150		
Turnout		1,430	18%	−7%
Labour hold		Swing		

=== Fairfield ===
Fairfield
Party	Candidate	Votes	%	±%
Conservative	J. P. Moyses *	2,409	65%	+14%
Labour	W. T. Brodie	1,311	35%	−14%
Majority		1,098		
Registered electors		12,737		
Turnout		3,720	29%	+2%
Conservative hold		Swing		

=== Fazakerley ===
Fazakerley
Party	Candidate	Votes	%	±%
Conservative	A. L. Ritchie	2,842	59%	+10%
Labour	W. H. Waldron ^{(PARTY)}	1,952	41%	−10%
Majority		890		
Registered electors		11,123		
Turnout		4,794	43%	0%
Conservative gain from Labour		Swing		

=== Gillmoss ===
Gillmoss
Party	Candidate	Votes	%	±%
Labour	G. E. Delooze *	2,284	60%	−13%
Conservative	P. N. Wilson	1,330	35%	+13%
Communist	F. W. Speakman	169	4%	−1%
Majority		954		
Registered electors		15,833		
Turnout		3,783	24%	−9%
Labour hold		Swing		

=== Granby ===
Granby
Party	Candidate	Votes	%	±%
Labour	J. D. Hamilton *	1,250	52%	−6%
Conservative	T. J. White	1,031	43%	+1%
Communist	J. Melia	118	5%	+5%
Majority		219		
Registered electors		10,248		
Turnout		2,399	23%	−10%
Labour hold		Swing		

=== Kensington ===
Kensington
Party	Candidate	Votes	%	±%
Labour	A. Fowler ^{(PARTY)}	1,643	54%	−10%
Conservative	T. J. Strange	1,376	46%	+13%
Majority		267		
Registered electors		11,468		
Turnout		3,019	26%	−3%
Labour hold		Swing		

=== Low Hill ===
Low Hill
Party	Candidate	Votes	%	±%
Labour	W. R. Snell *	1,026	52%	−16%
Conservative	W. F. Everett	874	44%	+16%
Communist	W. H. Black	72	4%	+4%
Majority		152		
Registered electors		8,069		
Turnout		1,972	24%	−2%
Labour hold		Swing		

=== Melrose ===
Melrose
Party	Candidate	Votes	%	±%
Labour	G. Ackers *	1,200	65%	−5%
Conservative	S. D. Lunt	636	35%	+5%
Majority		564		
Registered electors		8,841		
Turnout		1,836	21%	−6%
Labour hold		Swing		

=== Netherfield ===
Netherfield
Party	Candidate	Votes	%	±%
Protestant	A. Harris *	725	58%	+7%
Labour	E. C. Pimlett	526	42%	−7%
Majority		199		
Registered electors		5,872		
Turnout		1,251	21%	−13%
Protestant hold		Swing		

=== Old Swan ===
Old Swan
Party	Candidate	Votes	%	±%
Conservative	A. McKie Reid *	2,640	63%	+9%
Labour	J. Cloherty	1,571	37%	−9%
Majority		1,069		
Registered electors		14,007		
Turnout		4,211	30%	0%
Conservative hold		Swing		

=== Picton ===
Picton
Party	Candidate	Votes	%	±%
Conservative	Mrs. R. Dean	2,211	52%	+9%
Labour	H. Evans *'	2,005	48%	−9%
Majority		206		
Registered electors		13,295		
Turnout		4,216	32%	−6%
Conservative gain from Labour		Swing		

=== Pirrie ===
Pirrie
Party	Candidate	Votes	%	±%
Labour	M. Black *	2,940	55%	−13%
Conservative	I. A. T. Legge	2,376	45%	+13%
Majority		564		
Registered electors		15,908		
Turnout		5,316	33%	−4%
Labour hold		Swing		

=== Prince's Park ===
Prince's Park
Party	Candidate	Votes	%	±%
Labour	J. Sidwell *	1,631	49%	−5%
Conservative	G. W. Boult	1,221	37%	+6%
Independent	Rev. B. R. Green	401	12%	+12%
Communist	J. Galloway	88	3%	+3%
Majority		410		
Registered electors		12,062		
Turnout		3,341	28%	−4%
Labour hold		Swing		

=== Sandhills ===
Sandhills
Party	Candidate	Votes	%	±%
Labour	L. P. Hyams ^{(PARTY)}	1,304	82%	−7%
Conservative	E. L. Kirby	288	18%	+11%
Majority		1,016		
Registered electors		7,138		
Turnout		1,592	22%	−3%
Labour hold		Swing		

=== St. Domingo ===
St. Domingo
Party	Candidate	Votes	%	±%
Protestant	R. F. Henderson	1,434	50%	+6%
Labour	J. Gardner *	1,408	50%	−6%
Majority		26		
Registered electors		10,805		
Turnout		2,842	26%	−10%
Protestant gain from Labour		Swing		

=== St. James ===
St. James
Party	Candidate	Votes	%	±%
Labour	O. J. Doyle *	1,289	74%	−6%
Conservative	C. T. R, Viles	304	18%	−2%
Communist	R. O'Hara	144	8%	+8%
Majority		985		
Registered electors		9,354		
Turnout		1,737	19%	−6%
Labour hold		Swing		

=== St. Mary's ===
St. Mary's
Party	Candidate	Votes	%	±%
Labour	F. W. Longworth ^{(PARTY)}	1,609	51%	−7%
Conservative	J. Swainbank	1,551	49%	+7%
Majority		58		
Registered electors		10,390		
Turnout		3,160	30%	−9%
Labour hold		Swing		

=== St. Michael's ===
St. Michael's
Party	Candidate	Votes	%	±%
Conservative	A. McVeigh	2,505	57%	+15%
Liberal	J. R. Wilmington *	1,133	26%	−20%
Labour	V. P. Hyams	793	18%	+6%
Majority		1,712		
Registered electors		9,828		
Turnout		4,431	45%	0%
Conservative gain from Liberal		Swing		

=== Smithdown ===
Smithdown
Party	Candidate	Votes	%	±%
Labour	Mrs. E. E. Wright *	1,083	61%	−4%
Conservative	S. Whittaker	680	39%	+12%
Majority		403		
Registered electors		11,165		
Turnout		1,763	16%	−8%
Labour hold		Swing		

=== Speke ===
Speke
Party	Candidate	Votes	%	±%
Labour	T. Higgins *	1,414	64%	−13%
Conservative	A. J. Browne	796	36%	+13%
Majority		618		
Registered electors		13,836		
Turnout		2,210	16%	−11%
Labour hold		Swing		

=== Tuebrook ===
Tuebrook
Party	Candidate	Votes	%	±%
Conservative	R. M. Aymes	2,659	59%	+11%
Labour	B. Shaw	1,848	41%	−11%
Majority		811		
Registered electors		12,015		
Turnout		4,507	38%	−1%
Conservative gain from Labour		Swing		

=== Vauxhall ===
Vauxhall
Party	Candidate	Votes	%	±%
Labour	A. Dunfoed *	898	85%	−10%
Conservative	A. Lloyd	106	10%	+10%
Communist	T. E. Cassin	56	5%	0%
Majority		792		
Registered electors		9,084		
Turnout		1,060	12%	−6%
Labour hold		Swing		

=== Warbreck ===
Warbreck
Party	Candidate	Votes	%	±%
Conservative	D. A. Ritchie *	2,938	66%	+6%
Labour	H. E. Ankers	1,539	34%	−6%
Majority		1,399		
Registered electors		12,300		
Turnout		4,477	36%	+1%
Conservative hold		Swing		

=== Westminster ===
Westminster
Party	Candidate	Votes	%	±%
Conservative	W. Gilbody'	991	55%	+13%
Labour	T. Roberts	821	45%	−11%
Majority		170		
Registered electors		6,285		
Turnout		1,812	29%	−8%
Conservative gain from Labour		Swing		

=== Woolton ===
Woolton
Party	Candidate	Votes	%	±%
Conservative	L. B. Williams *	4,495	74%	+8%
Labour	G. R. Sullivan	1,571	26%	−8%
Majority		2,924		
Registered electors		18,845		
Turnout		6,066	32%	+3%
Conservative hold		Swing		
