= 1966 Liverpool City Council election =

1966 UK local election

← 1965	12 May 1966	1967 →
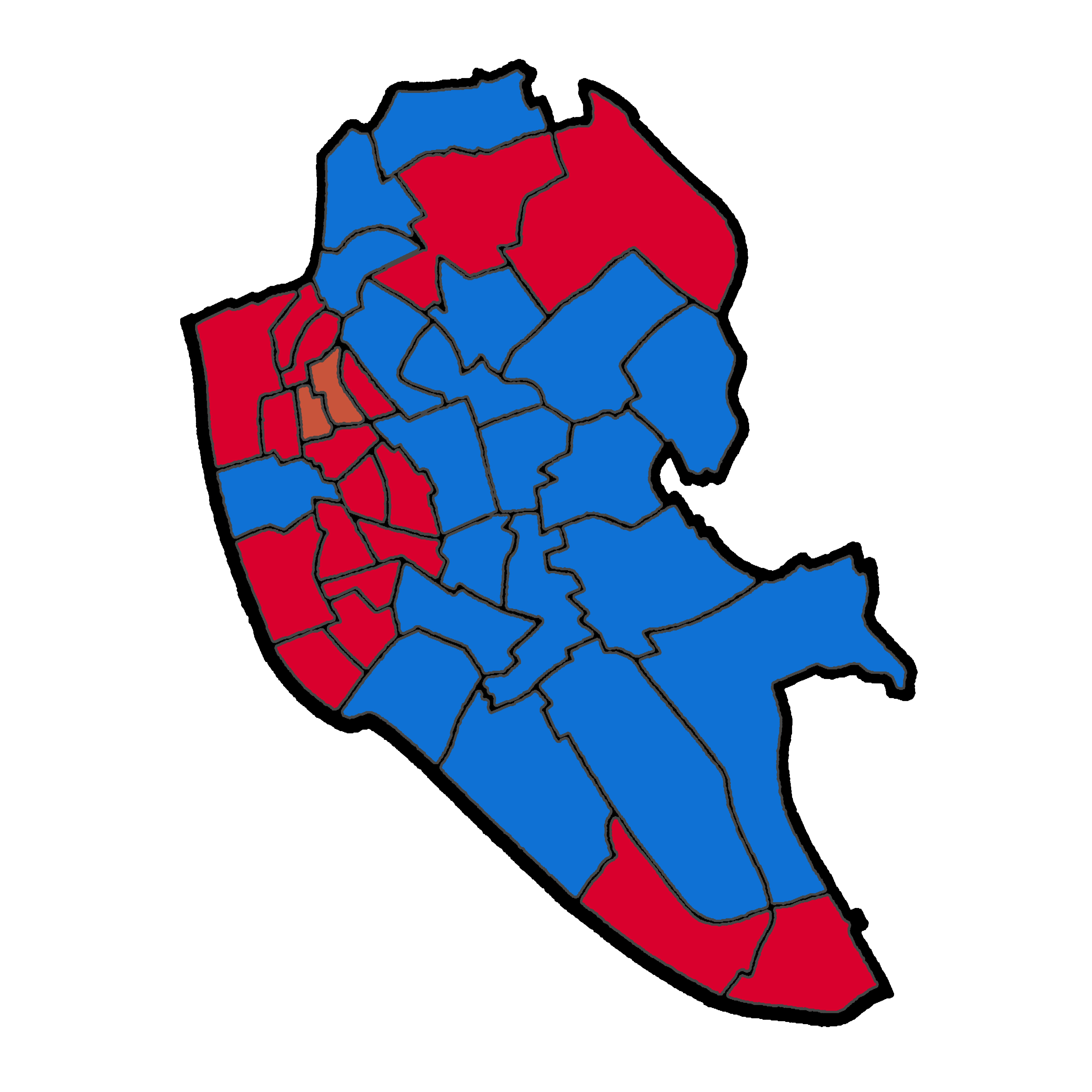
- Map of Liverpool showing wards won (first placed party)

Elections to Liverpool City Council were held on Thursday 12 May 1966.

After the election, the composition of the council was:

Party	Councillors	±	Aldermen
Conservative	56	+12	??
Labour	60	-12	??
Liberal	1	0	??
Protestant	5	+2	??

== Election result ==
Liverpool local election result 1966
Party	Seats	Gains	Losses	Net gain/loss	Seats %	Votes %	Votes	+/−
Conservative	21	10	0	+10	52.5%	52%	62,487	
Labour	17	0	12	-12	42.5%	39%	47,674	
Liberal	0	0	0	0	0%	7%	8,128	
Protestant	2	2	0	+2	5%	1.5%	1,832	
Communist	0	0	0	0	0%	0.63%	761	

== Ward results ==
* - Councillor seeking re-election

^{(PARTY)} - Party of former Councillor

The Councillors seeking re-election at this election were elected in 1963 for a three-year term, therefore comparisons are made with the 1963 election results.

=== Abercromby ===
Abercromby
Party	Candidate	Votes	%	±%
Labour	W. F. Burke ^{(PARTY)}	833	59%	−5%
Conservative	H. C. Norcott	447	32%	−1%
Communist	A. M^{c}Clelland	121	9%	+4%
Majority		386		
Registered electors		8,108		
Turnout		1,401	17%	−13%
Labour hold		Swing		

=== Aigburth ===
Aigburth
Party	Candidate	Votes	%	±%
Conservative	S. A. Cotton *	3,599	72%	+9%
Liberal	M. J. Mumford	1,002	20%	−7%
Labour	G. Bradwell	385	8%	+1%
Majority		2,597		
Registered electors		13,762		
Turnout		4,986	36%	−6%
Conservative hold		Swing		

=== Allerton ===
Allerton
Party	Candidate	Votes	%	±%
Conservative	D. E. Williams *	2,277	68%	−14%
Liberal	Mrs. J. Williams	735	22%	+22%
Labour	E. C. Pimlett	339	10%	−8%
Majority		1,542		
Registered electors		10,001		
Turnout		3,351	34%	−1%
Conservative hold		Swing		

=== Anfield ===
Anfield
Party	Candidate	Votes	%	±%
Conservative	R. G. Semple *	2,547	63%	+18%
Labour	S. W. Jones	1,527	37%	−3%
Majority		1,020		
Registered electors		13,321		
Turnout		4,074	31%	−12%
Conservative hold		Swing		

=== Arundel ===
Arundel
Party	Candidate	Votes	%	±%
Conservative	K. W. Edwards ^{(PARTY)}	2,243	64%	+22%
Labour	J. F. Cloherty	1,202	34%	
Communist	J. Kay	75	2%	0%
Majority		1,041		
Registered electors		12,188		
Turnout		3,520	29%	−14%
Conservative hold		Swing		

=== Breckfield ===
Breckfield
Party	Candidate	Votes	%	±%
Labour	L. Williams *	1,276	52%	−7%
Conservative	K. B. Jacques	1,178	48%	+7%
Majority		98		
Registered electors		10,254		
Turnout		2,454	24%	−14%
Labour hold		Swing		

=== Broadgreen ===
Broadgreen
Party	Candidate	Votes	%	±%
Conservative	J. Keenan *	2,138	66%	+16%
Labour	S. A. Roberts	759	23%	−6%
Liberal	W. M. Galbraith	357	11%	−10%
Majority		1,379		
Registered electors		11,015		
Turnout		3,254	30%	−6%
Conservative hold		Swing		

=== Central ===
Central
Party	Candidate	Votes	%	±%
Conservative	B. V. Groombridge	1,018	51%	+14%
Labour	G. J. Mawdsley ^{(PARTY)}	996	49%	−12%
Majority		22		
Registered electors		7,634		
Turnout		2,014	26%	−7%
Conservative gain from Labour		Swing		

=== Childwall ===
Childwall
Party	Candidate	Votes	%	±%
Conservative	S. Airey ^{(PARTY)}	3,287	52%	−20%
Liberal	D. L. Nadin	2,480	39%	+22%
Labour	R. Ashcroft	480	8%	−2%
Communist	A. B. Williams	67	1%	+1%
Majority		807		
Registered electors		17,678		
Turnout		6,314	36%	−3%
Conservative hold		Swing		

=== Church ===
Church
Party	Candidate	Votes	%	±%
Conservative	E. F. Pine ^{(PARTY)}	2,933	52%	−23%
Liberal	B. J. Maxwell	2,368	42%	+30%
Labour	A. Doswell	306	5%	−5%
Majority		565		
Registered electors		13,709		
Turnout		5,607	41%	+4%
Conservative hold		Swing		

=== Clubmoor ===
Clubmoor
Party	Candidate	Votes	%	±%
Conservative	E. Johnson	2,087	58%	+23%
Labour	R. Buckle *	1,538	42%	−12%
Majority		549		
Registered electors		10,665		
Turnout		3,625	34%	−15%
Conservative gain from Labour		Swing		

=== County ===
County
Party	Candidate	Votes	%	±%
Conservative	W. Thomas	2,079	52%	−9%
Labour	J. Dalrymple ^{(PARTY)}	1,938	48%	−9%
Majority		141		
Registered electors		12,660		
Turnout		4,017	32%	−12%
Conservative gain from Labour		Swing		

=== Croxteth ===
Croxteth
Party	Candidate	Votes	%	±%
Conservative	A. L. Audley *	3,384	79%	+28%
Labour	A. P. Lee	902	21%	−2%
Majority		2,482		
Registered electors		11,922		
Turnout		4,286	36%	−12%
Conservative hold		Swing		

=== Dingle ===
Dingle
Party	Candidate	Votes	%	±%
Labour	D. Cumella *	1,873	61%	−6%
Conservative	Dr. H. G. Prince	1,214	39%	+15%
Majority		659		
Registered electors		11,031		
Turnout		3,087	28%	−8%
Conservative gain from Labour		Swing		

=== Dovecot ===
Dovecot
Party	Candidate	Votes	%	±%
Conservative	J. L. Walsh	1,764	50%	+27%
Labour	W. H. Waldron ^{(PARTY)}	1,759	50%	−12%
Majority		5		
Registered electors		14,159		
Turnout		3,523	25%	−10%
Conservative gain from Labour		Swing		

=== Everton ===
Everton
Party	Candidate	Votes	%	±%
Labour	S. F. Jacobs *	626	69%	−6%
Conservative	N. Heywood	245	27%	+5%
Communist	Mrs. J. Wareham	36	4%	+1%
Majority		381		
Registered electors		7,697		
Turnout		907	12%	−12%
Labour hold		Swing		

=== Fairfield ===
Fairfield
Party	Candidate	Votes	%	±%
Conservative	J. Strange	1,892	59%	+24%
Labour	J. Guinan *	1,293	41%	−11%
Majority		599		
Registered electors		12,467		
Turnout		3,185	26%	−3%
Conservative gain from Labour		Swing		

=== Fazakerley ===
Fazakerley
Party	Candidate	Votes	%	±%
Conservative	A. Lloyd	2,209	57%	−8%
Labour	B Shaw ^{(PARTY)}	1,686	43%	−8%
Majority		523		
Registered electors		11,237		
Turnout		3,895	35%	−14%
Conservative gain from Labour		Swing		

=== Gillmoss ===
Gillmoss
Party	Candidate	Votes	%	±%
Labour	J. F. Stevens *	1,861	66%	−2%
Conservative	P.N. Wilson	952	34%	+19%
Majority		909		
Registered electors		15,619		
Turnout		2,813	18%	−18%
Labour hold		Swing		

=== Granby ===
Granby
Party	Candidate	Votes	%	±%
Labour	Mrs. M. Simey *	1,431	64%	+6%
Conservative	G. Hughes	709	32%	−5%
Communist	W. R. Jones	96	4%	0%
Majority		722		
Registered electors		10,122		
Turnout		2,236	22%	−13%
Labour hold		Swing		

=== Kensington ===
Kensington
Party	Candidate	Votes	%	±%
Labour	T. K. Williams *	1,697	63%	−4%
Conservative	F. R. Butler	1,009	37%	+8%
Majority		688		
Registered electors		11,362		
Turnout		2,706	24%	−11%
Labour hold		Swing		

=== Low Hill ===
Low Hill
Party	Candidate	Votes	%	±%
Labour	G. M. Scott *	992	59%	−16%
Conservative	W. F. Everett	625	37%	+15%
Communist	D. P. Holland	69	4%	+4%
Majority		367		
Registered electors		7,632		
Turnout		1,686	22%	−6%
Labour hold		Swing		

=== Melrose ===
Melrose
Party	Candidate	Votes	%	±%
Labour	C. H. Brown *	896	63%	−10%
Conservative	P. J. Dunne	530	37%	+10%
Majority		366		
Registered electors		8,662		
Turnout		1,426	16%	−12%
Labour hold		Swing		

=== Netherfield ===
Netherfield
Party	Candidate	Votes	%	±%
Protestant	W. Owen	586	67%	+24%
Labour	Dr. N. S. Barnett *	253	29%	−28%
Communist	F. Cartwright	35	4%	+4%
Majority		333		
Registered electors		4,812		
Turnout		874	18%	−13%
Protestant gain from Labour		Swing		

=== Old Swan ===
Old Swan
Party	Candidate	Votes	%	±%
Conservative	N. F. Derrick	1,958	50%	+12%
Labour	S. G. Thorne *	1,651	42%	−6%
Liberal	L. G. Burke	341	9%	−4%
Majority		307		
Registered electors		13,821		
Turnout		3,950	29%	−9%
Conservative gain from Labour		Swing		

=== Picton ===
Picton
Party	Candidate	Votes	%	±%
Conservative	Dr. Thomas Lyrian Hobday	1,908	51%	+18%
Labour	D. Pierce	1,821	49%	−3%
Majority		87		
Registered electors		13,174		
Turnout		3,729	28%	−12%
Conservative gain from Labour		Swing		

=== Pirrie ===
Pirrie
Party	Candidate	Votes	%	±%
Labour	J. McLean ^{(PARTY)}	2,216	51%	−19%
Conservative	I. A. T. Legge	2,124	49%	+19%
Majority		508		
Registered electors		15,949		
Turnout		4,340	27%	−15%
Labour hold		Swing		

=== Prince's Park ===
Prince's Park
Party	Candidate	Votes	%	±%
Labour	Dr. Cyril Taylor	1,750	57%	−4%
Conservative	G. W. Boult	1,242	40%	+11%
Communist	J. Galloway	89	3%	+3%
Majority		508		
Registered electors		11,745		
Turnout		3,081	26%	−6%
Labour hold		Swing		

=== Sandhills ===
Sandhills
Party	Candidate	Votes	%	±%
Labour	J. Scully *	1,158	80%	−11%
Conservative	E. L. Kirby	248	17%	+13%
Communist	B. Campbell	44	3%	−2%
Majority		910		
Registered electors		6,979		
Turnout		1,450	21%	−12%
Labour hold		Swing		

=== St. Domingo ===
St. Domingo
Party	Candidate	Votes	%	±%
Protestant	H. W. Blower	1,246	54%	+14%
Labour	F. Keating ^{(PARTY)}	1,072	46%	−11%
Majority		174		
Registered electors		10,529		
Turnout		2,318	22%	−12%
Protestant gain from Labour		Swing		

=== St. James ===
St. James
Party	Candidate	Votes	%	±%
Labour	T. McManus *	905	63%	−16%
Conservative	P. Robinson	370	26%	+5%
Communist	R. O'Hara	157	11%	+11%
Majority		535		
Registered electors		9,050		
Turnout		1,432	16%	−13%
Labour hold		Swing		

=== St. Mary's ===
St. Mary's
Party	Candidate	Votes	%	±%
Labour	P. Grannell ^{(PARTY)}	1,526	50%	−3%
Conservative	S. J. Swainbank	1,510	50%	+14%
Majority		16		
Registered electors		10,164		
Turnout		3,036	30%	−12%
Labour hold		Swing		

=== St. Michael's ===
St. Michael's
Party	Candidate	Votes	%	±%
Conservative	E. S. Nixon *	2,129	57%	+13%
Liberal	J. R. Wilmington	845	23%	−13%
Labour	R. Ludvigsen	774	21%	+2%
Majority		1,355		
Registered electors		9,772		
Turnout		3,758	38%	−10%
Conservative hold		Swing		

=== Smithdown ===
Smithdown
Party	Candidate	Votes	%	±%
Labour	W. Gibbs *	986	61%	−13%
Conservative	S. Whittaker	643	39%	+17%
Majority		343		
Registered electors		11,145		
Turnout		1,629	15%	−11%
Labour hold		Swing		

=== Speke ===
Speke
Party	Candidate	Votes	%	±%
Labour	F. J. McConville ^{(PARTY)}	1,070	57%	−24%
Conservative	H. K. Jones	798	43%	+24%
Majority		272		
Registered electors		14,034		
Turnout		1,868	13%	−12%
Labour hold		Swing		

=== Tuebrook ===
Tuebrook
Party	Candidate	Votes	%	±%
Conservative	M. P. Tinne	2,121	56%	+10%
Labour	H. Dailey *	1,657	44%	−10%
Majority		464		
Registered electors		11,646		
Turnout		3,778	32%	−8%
Conservative gain from Labour		Swing		

=== Vauxhall ===
Vauxhall
Party	Candidate	Votes	%	±%
Labour	J. A. Gallagher *	735	89%	−6%
Conservative	D. I. Horsey	46	6%	+6%
Communist	T. E. Cassin	41	5%	0%
Majority		689		
Registered electors		8,620		
Turnout		822	10%	−22%
Labour hold		Swing		

=== Warbreck ===
Warbreck
Party	Candidate	Votes	%	±%
Conservative	R. H. Morris ^{(PARTY)}	2,195	64%	+8%
Labour	J. H. Evans	1,229	36%	−8%
Majority		966		
Registered electors		12,185		
Turnout		3,424	28%	−7%
Conservative hold		Swing		

=== Westminster ===
Westminster
Party	Candidate	Votes	%	±%
Labour	J. Gardner ^{(PARTY)}	945	57%	−3%
Conservative	D. S. Jarvis	718	43%	+3%
Majority		227		
Registered electors		6,047		
Turnout		1,663	28%	−11%
Labour hold		Swing		

=== Woolton ===
Woolton
Party	Candidate	Votes	%	±%
Conservative	J. McAllister *	4,051	75%	+25%
Labour	L. A. Boner	1,331	25%	−1%
Majority		2,720		
Registered electors		19,352		
Turnout		5,382	28%	−18%
Conservative hold		Swing		
