= 1964 Liverpool City Council election =

1964 UK local election

← 1963	7 May 1964	1965 →
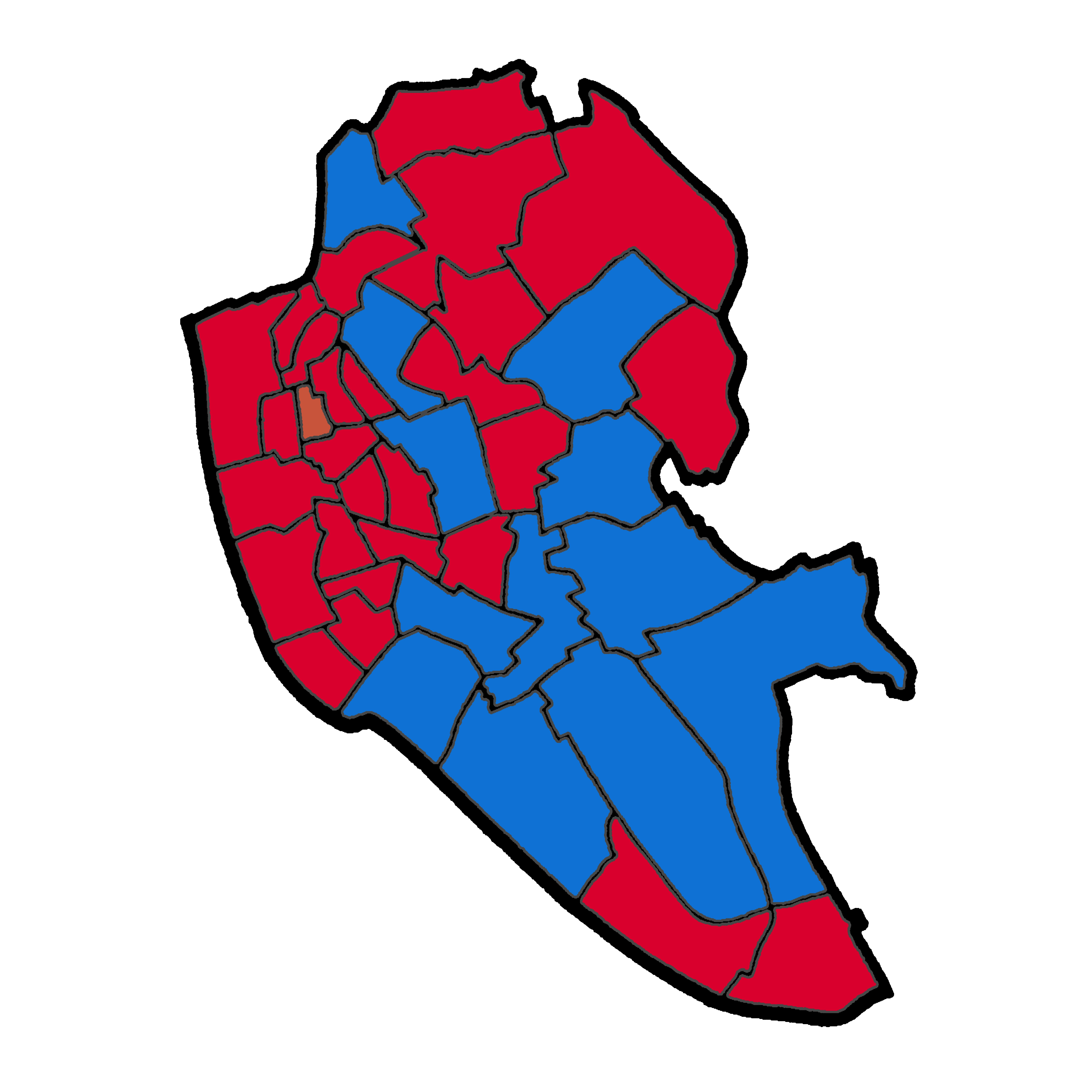
- Map of Liverpool showing wards won (first placed party)

Elections to Liverpool City Council were held on 7 May 1964.

After the election, the composition of the council was:

Party	Councillors	±	Aldermen
Labour	81	+13	16
Conservative	35	-7	22
Protestant	2	-1	0
Liberal	2	0	1

Note that there was one Conservative Aldermanic vacancy.

== Election result ==
Liverpool local election result 1964
Party	Seats	Gains	Losses	Net gain/loss	Seats %	Votes %	Votes	+/−
Conservative	13	0	6	-6	30%	41%	65,667	
Labour	30	7	0	+7	68%	48%	76,830	
Protestant	1	0	1	-1	2%	1.6%	2,540	
Liberal	0	0	0	0	0%	7.7%	12,178	
Communist	0	0	0	0	0%	0.66%	1,046	

== Ward results ==
* - Councillor seeking re-election

^{(PARTY)} - Party of former Councillor

The Councillors seeking re-election at this election were elected in 1961 for a three-year term, therefore comparisons are made with the 1961 election results.

=== Abercromby ===
Abercromby
Party	Candidate	Votes	%	±%
Labour	J. E. McPherson *	1,318	63%	+9%
Conservative	G. W. Boult	619	30%	−12%
Communist	A. M^{c}Clelland	161	8%	+8%
Majority		699		
Registered electors		9,118		
Turnout		2,098	23%	−2%
Labour hold		Swing		

=== Aigburth ===
Aigburth
Party	Candidate	Votes	%	±%
Conservative	J. E. R. Fischer ^{(PARTY)}	3,622	68%	−24%
Liberal	Mrs. A. Dyson	1,104	21%	+21%
Labour	S. J. Cook	590	11%	+3%
Majority		2,518		
Registered electors		13,805		
Turnout		5,316	39%	+4%
Conservative hold		Swing		

=== Allerton ===
Allerton
Party	Candidate	Votes	%	±%
Conservative	S. B. Caulfield ^{(PARTY)}	2,636	65%	−19%
Liberal	A. G. Wilson	775	19%	+19%
Labour	F. Longworth	657	16%	+16%
Majority		1,861		
Registered electors		10,082		
Turnout		1,861	40%	+6%
Conservative hold		Swing		

=== Anfield ===
Anfield
Party	Candidate	Votes	%	±%
Conservative	J. A Porter *	2,698	51%	−18%
Labour	S. W. Jones	2,220	42%	+11%
Liberal	R. Sutherland	367	7%	+7%
Majority		478		
Registered electors		13,705		
Turnout		5,285	39%	−2%
Conservative hold		Swing		

=== Arundel ===
Arundel
Party	Candidate	Votes	%	±%
Conservative	J. E. Kendrick ^{(PARTY)}	2,225	48%	−11%
Labour	T. Roberts	1,619	35%	+14%
Liberal	P. J. Goddard	560	12%	−4%
Communist	J. Kay	95	2%	−1%
Independent	R. H. Richardson	95	2%	+2%
Majority		606		
Registered electors		12,373		
Turnout		4,594	37%	+2%
Conservative hold		Swing		

=== Breckfield ===
Breckfield
Party	Candidate	Votes	%	±%
Labour	A. Williams	2,023	61%	+16%
Conservative	S. D. Lunt	1,268	39%	−16%
Majority		755		
Registered electors		10,799		
Turnout		3,291	30%	−7%
Labour gain from Conservative		Swing		

=== Broadgreen ===
Broadgreen
Party	Candidate	Votes	%	±%
Conservative	Mrs. L. Sanders ^{(PARTY)}	2,081	53%	−24%
Labour	L. A. Boner	1,227	31%	+17%
Majority		854		
Registered electors		11,223		
Turnout		3,923	35%	+4%
Conservative hold		Swing		

=== Central ===
Central
Party	Candidate	Votes	%	±%
Labour	Miss M. Schofield *	1,674	67%	+12%
Conservative	E. G. Hardman	842	33%	−12%
Majority		832		
Registered electors		8,198		
Turnout		2,516	31%	−1%
Labour hold		Swing		

=== Childwall ===
Childwall
Party	Candidate	Votes	%	±%
Conservative	W. E. Dailey ^{(PARTY)}	3,936	65%	+1%
Liberal	F. Barton	1,256	21%	−6%
Labour	L. P. Hyams	826	14%	+5%
Majority		2,680		
Registered electors		17,321		
Turnout		6,018	35%	−4%
Conservative hold		Swing		

=== Church ===
Church
Party	Candidate	Votes	%	±%
Conservative	J. L. Caldwell ^{(PARTY)}	3,435	55%	−1%
Liberal	G. A. Goddard	2,422	38%	+1%
Labour	J. F. Cloherty	445	7%	+1%
Majority		1,013		
Registered electors		13,694		
Turnout		6,302	46%	0%
Conservative hold		Swing		

=== Clubmoor ===
Clubmoor
Party	Candidate	Votes	%	±%
Labour	K. Stewart	2,398	52%	+9%
Conservative	N. A. Williams *	1,917	42%	−15%
Liberal	Edith A. Ousby	296	6%	+6%
Majority		481		
Registered electors		10,994		
Turnout		4,611	42%	0%
Labour gain from Conservative		Swing		

=== County ===
County 2 seats
Party	Candidate	Votes	%	±%
Labour	G. G. Maloney ^{(PARTY)}	2,867	51%	−2%
Labour	J. Dalrymple ^{(PARTY)}	2,784	50%	−3%
Conservative	R. B. Flude *	2,735	49%	+2%
Conservative	W. Thomas	2,518	45%	+2%
Majority		132		
Registered electors		13,224		
Turnout		5,602	42%	−4%
Labour hold		Swing		
Labour hold		Swing		

=== Croxteth ===
Croxteth
Party	Candidate	Votes	%	±%
Conservative	A. Morrow *	2,967	56%	−22%
Labour	W. F. Burke	1,251	24%	+2%
Liberal	J. Aspinall	1,100	21%	+21%
Majority		1,716		
Registered electors		11,559		
Turnout		5,318	46%	+2%
Conservative hold		Swing		

=== Dingle ===
Dingle
Party	Candidate	Votes	%	±%
Labour	R. Stoddart *	2,401	64%	+12%
Conservative	G. H. Prince	1,364	36%	−2%
Majority		1,037		
Registered electors		11,618		
Turnout		3,765	32%	−3%
Labour hold		Swing		

=== Dovecot ===
Dovecot
Party	Candidate	Votes	%	±%
Labour	T. H. Maloney *	2,690	63%	+12%
Conservative	T. Hillock	1,249	29%	−20%
Liberal	G. Ryder	315	7%	+7%
Majority		1,441		
Registered electors		14,263		
Turnout		4,254	30%	−2%
Labour hold		Swing		

=== Everton ===
Everton
Party	Candidate	Votes	%	±%
Labour	F. Burke *	1,342	73%	+9%
Conservative	E. Shaw	417	23%	−9%
Communist	Ellen Rivers	77	4%	0%
Majority		925		
Registered electors		9,175		
Turnout		1,836	20%	−3%
Labour hold		Swing		

=== Fairfield ===
Fairfield
Party	Candidate	Votes	%	±%
Conservative	J. S. Ross *	2,043	48%	−13%
Labour	A. Fowler	1,954	45%	+20%
Liberal	John Bowen	300	7%	−8%
Majority		89		
Registered electors		13,172		
Turnout		4,297	33%	+5%
Conservative hold		Swing		

=== Fazakerley ===
Fazakerley 2 seats
Party	Candidate	Votes	%	±%
Labour	Mrs. M. A. Cumella	2,626	51%	+9%
Labour	W. H. Waldron	2,550	50%	
Conservative	R. Bessell *	2,552	49%	−9%
Conservative	A. L. Ritchie	2,409	47%	−11%
Majority		104		
Registered electors		11,190		
Turnout		5,148	46%	−2%
Labour hold		Swing		
Labour hold		Swing		

=== Gillmoss ===
Gillmoss
Party	Candidate	Votes	%	±%
Labour	E. D. Rodderick *	3,323	72%	+6%
Conservative	J. J. Swainbank	1,119	24%	−10%
Communist	F. W. Speakman	197	4%	+4%
Majority		2,204		
Registered electors		15,868		
Turnout		4,639	29%	−3%
Labour hold		Swing		

=== Granby ===
Granby
Party	Candidate	Votes	%	±%
Labour	J. M. Burke	2,040	62%	+15%
Conservative	Mrs. R. Dean *	1,156	35%	−18%
Communist	J. Melia	118	4%	+4%
Majority		884		
Registered electors		10,663		
Turnout		3,314	31%	−2%
Labour gain from Conservative		Swing		

=== Kensington ===
Kensington
Party	Candidate	Votes	%	±%
Labour	Mrs. E. M. Wormold *	2,391	64%	+14%
Conservative	A. W. Hardy	1,361	36%	−11%
Majority		1,030		
Registered electors		11,622		
Turnout		3,752	32%	−7%
Labour hold		Swing		

=== Low Hill ===
Low Hill
Party	Candidate	Votes	%	±%
Labour	Mrs. M. J. Powell *	1,832	73%	+15%
Conservative	T. G. H. Cutts	607	24%	−18%
Communist	W. H. Black	77	3%	+3%
Majority		1,225		
Registered electors		8,954		
Turnout		2,516	28%	−4%
Labour hold		Swing		

=== Melrose ===
Melrose
Party	Candidate	Votes	%	±%
Labour	J. J. Hastings ^{(PARTY)}	1,757	72%	+9%
Conservative	T. J. Strange	689	28%	−9%
Majority		1,068		
Registered electors		9,068		
Turnout		2,446	27%	0%
Labour hold		Swing		

=== Netherfield ===
Netherfield
Party	Candidate	Votes	%	±%
Protestant	A. Brown *	1,043	51%	−7%
Labour	G. Carmichael	988	49%	+7%
Majority		55		
Registered electors		6,893		
Turnout		2,031	29%	+1%
Protestant hold		Swing		

=== Old Swan ===
Old Swan
Party	Candidate	Votes	%	±%
Labour	Eddie Loyden	2,402	50%	+6%
Conservative	W. F. Everett	2,032	42%	−14%
Liberal	M. A. Globe	368	8%	+8%
Majority		370		
Registered electors		14,307		
Turnout		4,802	34%	−3%
Labour gain from Conservative		Swing		

=== Picton ===
Picton
Party	Candidate	Votes	%	±%
Labour	T. Bailey	2,574	55%	+9%
Conservative	J. Polack *	1,772	38%	−16%
Liberal	B. Caplan	297	6%	+6%
Majority		802		
Registered electors		13,517		
Turnout		4,643	34%	−7%
Labour gain from Conservative		Swing		

=== Pirrie ===
Pirrie
Party	Candidate	Votes	%	±%
Labour	W. H. Hart *	3,958	67%	+12%
Conservative	I. M. T. Legge	1,966	33%	−12%
Majority		1,992		
Registered electors		16,185		
Turnout		5,924	37%	−5%
Labour hold		Swing		

=== Prince's Park ===
Prince's Park
Party	Candidate	Votes	%	±%
Labour	T. C. Greenwood *	1,946	58%	+13%
Conservative	W. T. Savage	1,186	35%	−7%
Liberal	A. Garland	221	7%	−6%
Majority		760		
Registered electors		12,606		
Turnout		3,353	27%	−8%
Labour hold		Swing		

=== Sandhills ===
Sandhills
Party	Candidate	Votes	%	±%
Labour	W. H. Aldritt *	1,954	85%	−1%
Conservative	P. H. Williams	245	11%	+1%
Communist	B. Campbell	102	4%	−1%
Majority		1,709		
Registered electors		7,494		
Turnout		2,301	31%	+6%
Labour hold		Swing		

=== St. Domingo ===
St. Domingo
Party	Candidate	Votes	%	±%
Labour	F. N. Marsden	1,859	54%	+4%
Protestant	R. F. Henderson	1,497	44%	−6%
Communist	A. B. Williams	84	2%	+2%
Majority		362		
Registered electors		11,260		
Turnout		3,440	31%	−6%
Labour gain from Protestant		Swing		

=== St. James ===
St. James
Party	Candidate	Votes	%	±%
Labour	R. Parry ^{(PARTY)}	1,873	74%	+7%
Conservative	G. Hughes	513	20%	−13%
Communist	R. O'Hara	150	6%	+6%
Majority		1,360		
Registered electors		9,673		
Turnout		2,536	26%	+5%
Labour hold		Swing		

=== St. Mary's ===
St. Mary's
Party	Candidate	Votes	%	±%
Labour	S. R. Maddox *	2,640	66%	+15%
Conservative	T. W. Wilkinson	1,338	34%	−13%
Majority		1,302		
Registered electors		10,685		
Turnout		3,978	37%	−5%
Labour hold		Swing		

=== St. Michael's ===
St. Michael's
Party	Candidate	Votes	%	±%
Conservative	Mrs. M. Browne ^{(PARTY)}	2,228	49%	−18%
Liberal	A. Globe	1,281	28%	+10%
Labour	A. P. Lee	1,067	23%	+13%
Majority		947		
Registered electors		9,898		
Turnout		4,576	46%	+8%
Conservative hold		Swing		

=== Smithdown ===
Smithdown
Party	Candidate	Votes	%	±%
Labour	G. W. Clarke *	1,892	68%	+4%
Conservative	S. Whittaker	739	26%	−10%
British Nat.	R. J. Williams	159	6%	+6%
Majority		1,153		
Registered electors		11,447		
Turnout		2,790	24%	0%
Labour hold		Swing		

=== Speke ===
Speke 2 seats
Party	Candidate	Votes	%	±%
Labour	B. Crookes *	2,400	72%	+4%
Labour	F. J. McConville ^{(PARTY)}	2,289	69%	+1%
Conservative	A. J. Browne	708	21%	−11%
Conservative	D. R. Bushnell	681	20%	−12%
Liberal	M. J. Mumford	222	7%	+7%
Majority		1,692		
Registered electors		13,978		
Turnout		3,330	24%	+1%
Labour hold		Swing		
Labour hold		Swing		

=== Tuebrook ===
Tuebrook
Party	Candidate	Votes	%	±%
Labour	J. Mottram	2,368	52%	+8%
Conservative	R. M. Aymes *	2,230	48%	−8%
Majority		138		
Registered electors		12,137		
Turnout		4,598	38%	−2%
Labour gain from Conservative		Swing		

=== Vauxhall ===
Vauxhall
Party	Candidate	Votes	%	±%
Labour	Paul Orr ^{(PARTY)}	2,437	94%	+13%
Conservative	P. S. Jones	97	4%	+4%
Communist	T. E. Cassin	62	2%	−9%
Majority		2,340		
Registered electors		9,285		
Turnout		2,596	28%	+12%
Labour hold		Swing		

=== Warbreck ===
Warbreck 2 seats
Party	Candidate	Votes	%	±%
Conservative	A. H. Maynard ^{(PARTY)}	2,535	57%	−10%
Conservative	R. H. Morris	2,383	54%	−13%
Labour	H. E. Ankers	1,901	43%	+10%
Labour	J. McKeown	1,857	42%	+9%
Majority		634		
Registered electors		12,457		
Turnout		4,436	36%	+1%
Conservative hold		Swing		
Conservative hold		Swing		

=== Westminster ===
Westminster
Party	Candidate	Votes	%	±%
Labour	E. Burke *	1,435	64%	+14%
Conservative	W. Gilbody	824	36%	−14%
Majority		611		
Registered electors		6,682		
Turnout		2,259	34%	−3%
Labour hold		Swing		

=== Woolton ===
Woolton
Party	Candidate	Votes	%	±%
Conservative	J. Norton *	4,000	62%	−14%
Labour	G. R. Sullivan	1,822	28%	+4%
Liberal	J. Deaves	679	10%	+10%
Majority		2,178		
Registered electors		17,959		
Turnout		6,501	36%	+2%
Conservative hold		Swing		

== Aldermanic Elections ==
Twenty of the forty Aldermen were elected by the city council on 20 May 1964. There were 20 vacancies, 7 Conservative and 13 Labour, with 20 Labour candidates returned. Those elected by the council and the wards they were allocated to are shown in the table below:

Party	Alderman	Ward
Labour	Louis Caplan (Lord Mayor)	
Labour	Hugh Carr	
Labour	Brian Crooks	
Labour	Len Holden	
Labour	C. J. Milton	
Labour	J. M. Taylor	
Labour	Fred Walker	
Labour	Frank Cain*	
Labour	J. J. Cleary*	
Labour	David Cowley*	
Labour	James Cullen*	
Labour	Hugh Dalton*	
Labour	Alex Griffin*	
Labour	I. I. Levin*	
Labour	Charles McDonald*	
Labour	Joseph Morgan*	
Labour	P. J. O'Hare*	
Labour	M. J. Reppion	
Labour	W. H. Sefton*	
Labour	John Sheehan*	

- Re-elected
