= 1967 Liverpool City Council election =

1967 UK local election

← 1966	11 May 1967	1968 →
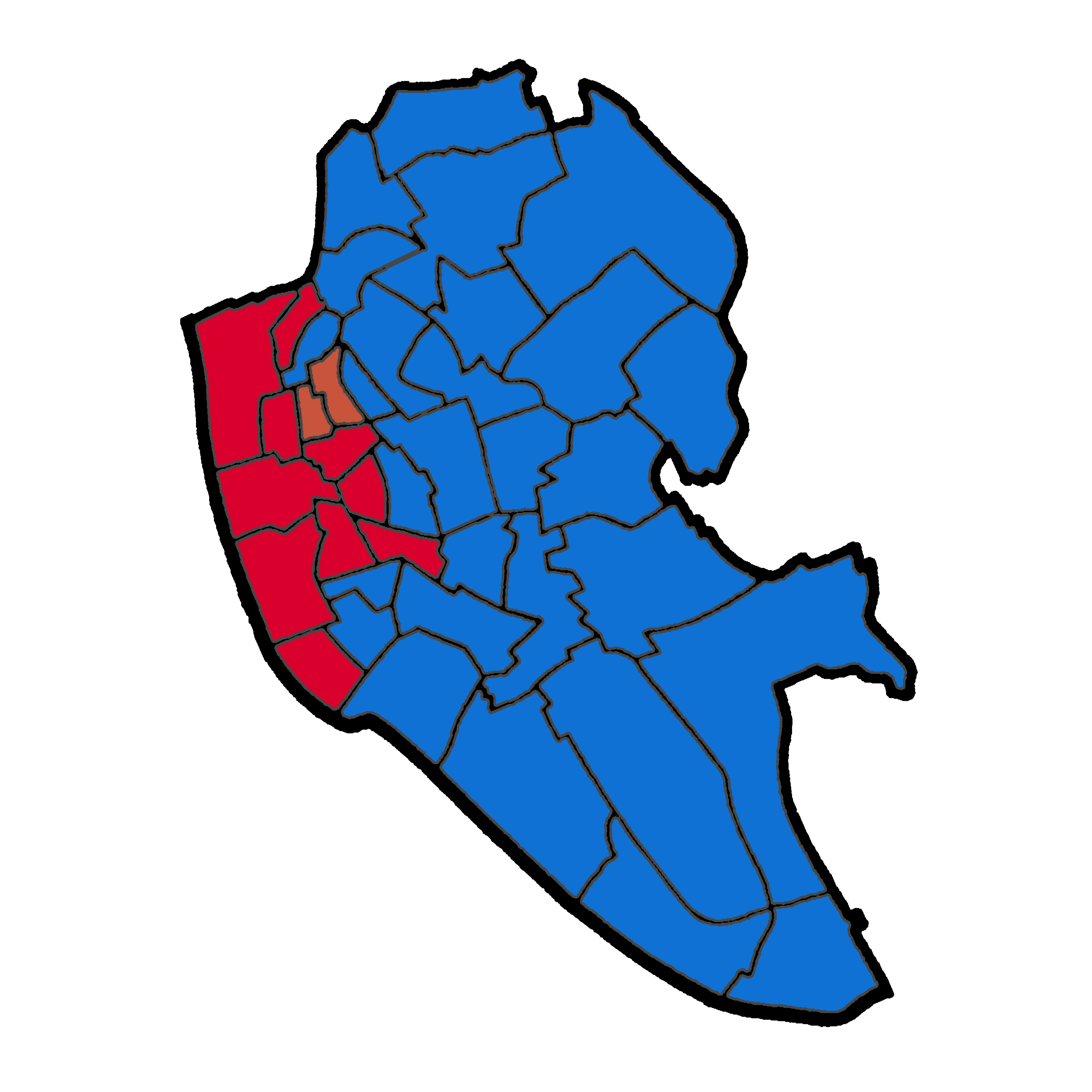
- Map of Liverpool showing wards won (first placed party)

Elections to Liverpool City Council were held on 11 May 1967.

After the election, the composition of the council was:

Party	Councillors	±	Aldermen	Total
Conservative	67	+17	17	84
Labour	46	-16	22	68
Liberal	1	0	1	2
Protestant	6	+1	0	6

== Election result ==
Liverpool local election result 1967
Party	Seats	Gains	Losses	Net gain/loss	Seats %	Votes %	Votes	+/−
Conservative	28				68%	59%	91,809	
Labour	11				27%	36%	55,888	
Liberal	0	0	0	0	0%	4.2%	6,493	
Protestant	2	0	0	2	5%	1.5%	2,352	
Communist	0	0	0	0	0%	1%	1,581	

== Ward results ==
* - Councillor seeking re-election

^{(PARTY)} - Party of former Councillor

The Councillors seeking re-election at this election were elected in 1964 for a three-year term, therefore comparisons are made with the 1964 election results.

=== Abercromby ===
Abercromby
Party	Candidate	Votes	%	±%
Labour	John E. M^{c}Pherson *	695	48%	−15%
Conservative	Herbert C. Norcott	603	41%	+11%
Communist	A. M^{c}Clelland	159	11%	+3%
Majority		92		
Registered electors		7,276		
Turnout		1,457	20%	−3%
Labour hold		Swing		

=== Aigburth ===
Aigburth
Party	Candidate	Votes	%	±%
Conservative	John E. R. Fischer *	5,030	79%	+11%
Liberal	Alan G. Wilson	884	14%	−7%
Labour	Edwin C. Pimlett	459	7%	−4%
Majority		4,146		
Registered electors		13,430		
Turnout		6,373	47%	+8%
Conservative hold		Swing		

=== Allerton ===
Allerton
Party	Candidate	Votes	%	±%
Conservative	Stanley B. Caulfield *	3,392	80%	+15%
Labour	Rodney Ludvigsen	434	10%	−6%
Liberal	Mrs. Margaret S. Springbett	405	10%	−9%
Majority		2,958		
Registered electors		9,887		
Turnout		4,231	43%	+3%
Conservative hold		Swing		

=== Anfield ===
Anfield
Party	Candidate	Votes	%	±%
Conservative	James A. Porter M.B.E. *	3,407	72%	+21%
Labour	Sydesy W. Jones	1,352	28%	−14%
Majority		2,055		
Registered electors		13,033		
Turnout		4,759	37%	−2%
Conservative hold		Swing		

=== Arundel ===
Arundel
Party	Candidate	Votes	%	±%
Conservative	John E. Kendrick	2,840	69%	+21%
Labour	Joseph Cloherty	1,137	28%	−7%
Communist	Jack Kay	134	3%	+1%
Majority		1,703		
Registered electors		12,243		
Turnout		4,111	34%	−3%
Conservative hold		Swing		

=== Breckfield ===
Breckfield
Party	Candidate	Votes	%	±%
Conservative	Kenneth B. Jacques	1,929	57%	+18%
Labour	Andrew Williams *	1,430	43%	−18%
Majority		499		
Registered electors		9,897		
Turnout		3,359	34%	+4%
Conservative gain from Labour		Swing		

=== Broadgreen ===
Broadgreen
Party	Candidate	Votes	%	±%
Conservative	Mrs. Lennie Sanders *	2,693	70%	+17%
Labour	John W. Hubble	744	19%	−12%
Resident	Ernest Bide	436	11%	
Majority		1,948		
Registered electors		11,003		
Turnout		3,872	35%	0%
Conservative hold		Swing		

=== Central ===
Central
Party	Candidate	Votes	%	±%
Labour	James E. Walker ^{(PARTY)}	1,299	53%	−14%
Conservative	John R. P. Dennis	1,151	47%	+14%
Majority		148		
Registered electors		7,186		
Turnout		2,450	34%	+3%
Labour hold		Swing		

=== Childwall ===
Childwall
Party	Candidate	Votes	%	±%
Conservative	William E. Dailey *	4,890	71%	+6%
Liberal	Owen Trevor Jones	1,363	20%	−1%
Labour	Stanley G. Thorne	659	10%	−4%
Majority		3,527		
Registered electors		17,174		
Turnout		6,912	40%	+5%
Conservative hold		Swing		

=== Church ===
Church
Party	Candidate	Votes	%	±%
Conservative	Sir Charles C. Martin ^{(PARTY)}	3,879	59%	+4%
Liberal	John Swinnerton	2,238	34%	−4%
Labour	Vincent P. Hyams	427	7%	0%
Majority		1,641		
Registered electors		13,535		
Turnout		6,544	48%	+2%
Conservative hold		Swing		

=== Clubmoor ===
Clubmoor
Party	Candidate	Votes	%	±%
Conservative	John F. Jones	2,797	57%	+15%
Labour	Kenneth Stewart *	2,099	43%	−9%
Majority		698		
Registered electors		10,442		
Turnout		4,896	47%	+5%
Conservative gain from Labour		Swing		

=== County ===
County
Party	Candidate	Votes	%	±%
Conservative	Percy Tunna	3,073	59%	+10%
Labour	George G. Maloney *	1,875	36%	−15%
Communist	Kenneth T. Dowd	234	5%	+5%
Majority		1,198		
Registered electors		12,488		
Turnout		5,182	41%	−1%
Conservative gain from Labour		Swing		

=== Croxteth ===
Croxteth
Party	Candidate	Votes	%	±%
Conservative	Dr. George Harrald Prince ^{(PARTY)}	4,326	83%	+27%
Labour	Joseph H. Evans	881	17%	−7%
Majority		3,445		
Registered electors		11,796		
Turnout		5,207	44%	−2%
Conservative hold		Swing		

=== Dingle ===
Dingle
Party	Candidate	Votes	%	±%
Labour	Roy Stoddart *	1,818	48%	−16%
Conservative	Mrs. Kathlenn Prescott	1,784	47%	+11%
Communist	David I. Thompson	154	4%	
Majority		34		
Registered electors		10,633		
Turnout		3,756	35%	+3%
Labour hold		Swing		

=== Dovecot ===
Dovecot
Party	Candidate	Votes	%	±%
Conservative	Geoffrey E. Brandwood	3,075	53%	+24%
Labour	Thomas H. Maloney	2,738	47%	−16%
Majority		337		
Registered electors		15,094		
Turnout		5,813	39%	+9%
Conservative gain from Labour		Swing		

=== Everton ===
Everton
Party	Candidate	Votes	%	±%
Labour	Francis Burke *	862	46%	−27%
Conservative	John Mass	673	36%	+13%
Liberal	Michael V. Lilley	299	16%	+16%
Majority		189		
Registered electors		7,465		
Turnout		1,887	25%	+5%
Labour hold		Swing		

=== Fairfield ===
Fairfield
Party	Candidate	Votes	%	±%
Conservative	James S. Ross *	2,484	68%	+20%
Labour	John Guinan	1,167	32%	−13%
Majority		1,317		
Registered electors		12,148		
Turnout		1,317	30%	−3%
Conservative hold		Swing		

=== Fazakerley ===
Fazakerley
Party	Candidate	Votes	%	±%
Conservative	Ingram A. T. Legge	2,895	63%	+14%
Labour	Dr. Norman S. Barnett	1,729	37%	−14%
Majority		1,166		
Registered electors		11,156		
Turnout		4,624	41%	−5%
Conservative hold		Swing		

=== Gillmoss ===
Gillmoss
Party	Candidate	Votes	%	±%
Conservative	Peter J. Dunne	2,089	45%	+21%
Labour	Edward D. Roderick	1,943	42%	−30%
Liberal	Joseph R. Wilmington	645	14%	+14%
Majority		146		
Registered electors		15,525		
Turnout		4,677	30%	+1%
Conservative gain from Labour		Swing		

=== Granby ===
Granby
Party	Candidate	Votes	%	±%
Conservative	Glyn Hughes	1,259	48%	+13%
Labour	James M. Burke *	1,214	47%	−15%
Majority		45		
Registered electors		9,731		
Turnout		2,596	27%	−4%
Conservative gain from Labour		Swing		

=== Kensington ===
Kensington
Party	Candidate	Votes	%	±%
Conservative	Frederick R. Butler	1,976	51%	+15%
Labour	Mrs. Ethel M. Wormald	1,884	49%	−15%
Majority		92		
Registered electors		11,056		
Turnout		3,860	35%	+3%
Conservative gain from Labour		Swing		

=== Low Hill ===
Low Hill
Party	Candidate	Votes	%	±%
Labour	Mrs. Mary J. Powell *	1,364	56%	−17%
Conservative	William F. Everett	984	41%	+17%
Communist	Donald P. Holland	78	3%	0%
Majority		380		
Registered electors		7,155		
Turnout		2,426	34%	+6%
Labour hold		Swing		

=== Melrose ===
Melrose 2 seats
Party	Candidate	Votes	%	±%
Labour	James J. Hastings *	1,230	57%	−15%
Labour	Benjamin Shaw	1,173	54%	−18%
Conservative	Thomas Head-Rapson	945	43%	+15%
Conservative	Daniel J. Jones	941	43%	+15%
Majority		285		
Registered electors		8,212		
Turnout		2,175	26%	−1%
Labour hold		Swing		
Labour hold		Swing		

=== Netherfield ===
Netherfield
Party	Candidate	Votes	%	±%
Protestant	Albert Brown *	679	62%	+11%
Labour	Frank Keating	372	34%	−15%
Communist	Frank Cartwright	46	4%	+4%
Majority		307		
Registered electors		4,021		
Turnout		1,097	27%	−2%
Protestant hold		Swing		

=== Old Swan ===
Old Swan
Party	Candidate	Votes	%	±%
Conservative	Arthur J. Browne	2,987	60%	+18%
Labour	Edward Loyden *	1,968	40%	−10%
Majority		1,019		
Registered electors		13,412		
Turnout		4,955	37%	+3%
Conservative gain from Labour		Swing		

=== Picton ===
Picton
Party	Candidate	Votes	%	±%
Conservative	Clifford J. Kinrade	2,694	59%	+21%
Labour	Tom Bailey *	1,899	41%	+14%
Majority		795		
Registered electors		12,839		
Turnout		4,593	36%	+2%
Conservative gain from Labour		Swing		

=== Pirrie ===
Pirrie
Party	Candidate	Votes	%	±%
Conservative	Peter J. McCann	3,485	53%	+20%
Labour	John Dalrymple ^{(PARTY)}	3,040	47%	−20%
Majority		445		
Registered electors		15,645		
Turnout		6,525	42%	+5%
Conservative gain from Labour		Swing		

=== Prince's Park ===
Prince's Park
Party	Candidate	Votes	%	±%
Conservative	William T. Savage	2,016	51%	+16%
Labour	Thomas C. Greenwood	1,819	46%	−12%
Communist	John Galloway	152	4%	+4%
Majority		197		
Registered electors		11,440		
Turnout		3,987	35%	+8%
Conservative gain from Labour		Swing		

=== Sandhills ===
Sandhills
Party	Candidate	Votes	%	±%
Labour	Miss Margaret Schofield ^{(PARTY)}	1,394	69%	−17%
Conservative	Frederick Jones	544	27%	+16%
Communist	Brian Campbell	72	4%	0%
Majority		850		
Registered electors		7,025		
Turnout		2,010	29%	−2%
Labour hold		Swing		

=== St. Domingo ===
St. Domingo
Party	Candidate	Votes	%	±%
Protestant	Roy Hughes	1,673	54%	+10%
Labour	Frank N. Marsden *	1,313	43%	−11%
Communist	Richard M^{c}Guire	102	3%	+1%
Majority		360		
Registered electors		9,844		
Turnout		3,088	31%	0%
Protestant gain from Labour		Swing		

=== St. James ===
St. James
Party	Candidate	Votes	%	±%
Labour	Robert Parry *	1,015	51%	−23%
Conservative	Mrs. Jessie E. Reid	522	26%	+6%
Liberal	Gershon Greenberg	248	12%	+12%
Communist	Roger O'Hara	215	11%	+5%
Majority		493		
Registered electors		8,612		
Turnout		2,000	23%	−3%
Labour hold		Swing		

=== St. Mary's ===
St. Mary's
Party	Candidate	Votes	%	±%
Conservative	William L. Harris	2,194	52%	+18%
Labour	Stanley R. Maddox *	2,021	48%	−18%
Majority		173		
Registered electors		9,925		
Turnout		4,215	42%	+5%
Conservative gain from Labour		Swing		

=== St. Michael's ===
St. Michael's
Party	Candidate	Votes	%	±%
Conservative	Mrs. Marion Browne M.B.E. *	2,653	68%	+19%
Labour	David M. Mitchell	852	22%	−1%
Liberal	Miss Margaret J. Baber	411	10%	−18%
Majority		1,801		
Registered electors		9,648		
Turnout		3,916	41%	−5%
Conservative hold		Swing		

=== Smithdown ===
Smithdown
Party	Candidate	Votes	%	±%
Labour	George W. Clarke *	1,034	53%	−15%
Conservative	Stanley Whittaker	930	47%	+21%
Majority		104		
Registered electors		10,160		
Turnout		1,964	19%	−5%
Labour hold		Swing		

=== Speke ===
Speke
Party	Candidate	Votes	%	±%
Conservative	Harry K. Jones	1,913	53%	+32%
Labour	Stephen J. Cook	1,709	47%	−25%
Majority		204		
Registered electors		13,899		
Turnout		3,622	26%	+2%
Conservative gain from Labour		Swing		

=== Tuebrook ===
Tuebrook
Party	Candidate	Votes	%	±%
Conservative	Norman A. Pannell	2,932	61%	
Labour	James Mottram	1,901	39%	−13%
Majority		1,031		
Registered electors		11,413		
Turnout		4,833	42%	+4%
Conservative gain from Labour		Swing		

=== Vauxhall ===
Vauxhall
Party	Candidate	Votes	%	±%
Labour	Paul Orr *	1,073	84%	−10%
Conservative	Herbert A. Williams	150	12%	+8%
Communist	Thomas E. Cassin	59	5%	+3%
Majority		923		
Registered electors		7,610		
Turnout		1,282	17%	−11%
Labour hold		Swing		

=== Warbreck ===
Warbreck
Party	Candidate	Votes	%	±%
Conservative	Albert H. K. Maynard *	2,859	70%	+13%
Labour	Peter Comer	2,232	30%	−13%
Majority		1,627		
Registered electors		11,868		
Turnout		4,091	34%	−2%
Conservative hold		Swing		

=== Westminster ===
Westminster
Party	Candidate	Votes	%	±%
Conservative	James Gillin	1,210	51%	+15%
Labour	Edward Burke *	1,165	49%	−15%
Majority		45		
Registered electors		6,047		
Turnout		2,375	39%	+5%
Conservative gain from Labour		Swing		

=== Woolton ===
Woolton
Party	Candidate	Votes	%	±%
Conservative	Joseph Norton *	5,606	79%	+17%
Labour	George J. Maudsley	1,468	21%	−7%
Majority		4,138		
Registered electors		19,254		
Turnout		7,074	37%	+1%
Conservative hold		Swing		

== Aldermanic Elections ==
Twenty of the forty Aldermen were elected by the city council on 22 May 1967. Those elected by the council and the wards they were allocated to are shown in the table below:

Party	Alderman	Ward
Conservative	Stanley Airey	St. James
Conservative	Herbert M. Allen	Speke
Conservative	Alfred N. Bates	Dovecot
Conservative	William Browne	Clubmoor
Conservative	Arthur B. Collins M.B.E.	Abercromby
Conservative	Charles Cowlin	old Swan
Conservative	Raymond F. Craine M.B.E.	Vauxhall
Conservative	Harold W. Hughes O.B.E.	Tuebrook
Conservative	John Keenan	Woolton
Conservative	Harold Lees	Westminster
Conservative	Arthur W. Lowe O.B.E.	Melrose
Conservative	Robert Meadows	Princes Park
Conservative	Stephen Minion O.B.E.	Anfield
Conservative	Joseph Norton	Broadgreen
Conservative	Ralph Rattray	Pirrie
Conservative	Leslie H. Sanders	Aigburth
Conservative	Harold M. Steward	Low Hill
Conservative	James E. Thompson	St. Domingo
Conservative	Frank Woolfenden	Fazakerley
Conservative	Alexander Young	St. Michael's
