= 1848 Liverpool Town Council election =

English local election

← 1847	November 1, 1848	1849 →

16 seats were up for election: one seat for each of the 16 wards 33 (incl. Aldermen) seats needed for a majority

Elections to Liverpool Town Council were held on Wednesday 1 November 1848, with the exception of Castle Street and Scotland wards where the elections were held on 2 November because the Aldermen for these wards were not able to act as returning officers. One third of the council seats were up for election, the term of office of each councillor being three years.

Eight of the sixteen wards were uncontested.

This was the first year that the local press referred to "Liberals" rather than "Reformers"

The main issue at this election was whether the Corporation's estate and the docks should be subject to Rates (tax).

After the election, the composition of the council was:

Party	Councillors	±	Aldermen	Total
Conservative	33	0	15	48
Reformers	15	0	1	16

== Election result ==
Liverpool local election result 1848
Party	Seats	Gains	Losses	Net gain/loss	Seats %	Votes %	Votes	+/−
Conservative	10	4	4	0	62%	60%	1,826	
Whig	6	4	4	0	38%	40%	1,218	

Because half of the wards were uncontested, these statistics should be taken in that context.

== Ward results ==
* - Retiring Councillor seeking re-election

=== Abercromby ===
No. 11 Abercromby
Party	Candidate	Votes	%	±%
Conservative	Hugn Neil	249	55%	
Whig	William Earle	201	45%	
Majority		48	10%	
Registered electors				
Turnout		450		
Conservative hold		Swing		

Polling Place : The Phœnix Inn, on the east side of Mount-pleasant.

=== Castle Street ===
No. 6 Castle Street
Party	Candidate	Votes	%	±%
Whig	Hugh Hornby *	Unopposed	N/A	N/A
Registered electors				
Whig hold				

Polling Place : The Saracen's Head in Dale-street.

=== Everton ===
No. 1 Everton
Party	Candidate	Votes	%	±%
Whig	Edward Langsdale	352	51%	
Conservative	Francis Shand *	338	49%	
Majority		14	2%	
Registered electors				
Turnout		690		
Whig gain from Conservative		Swing		

Polling Place : The Public-house on the north side of Great Homer-street, Occupied by Mr. Charles Unwin.

Francis Shand was opposed to the rating of the Corporation and Dock Estates, Edward Langsdale was of the opposite view.

=== Exchange ===
No. 5 Exchange
Party	Candidate	Votes	%	±%
Conservative	Thomas Littledale jun. *	Unopposed	N/A	N/A
Registered electors				
Conservative hold				

Polling Place : The north end of the Sessions' house, in Chapel-street.

Thomas Littledale jun. was a pro-rater.

=== Great George ===
No. 9 Great George
Party	Candidate	Votes	%	±%
Conservative	Thomas Wagstaff	202	58%	
Whig	Thomas Lloyd	147	42%	
Majority		55	16%	
Registered electors				
Turnout		349		
Conservative hold		Swing		

Polling Place : The Shop, No. 64 at the north side of Nelson-street, occupied by Mr. Richard Hesketh.

=== Lime Street ===
No. 12 Lime Street
Party	Candidate	Votes	%	±%
Whig	James Johnson	Unopposed	N/A	N/A
Registered electors				
Whig hold				

Polling Place : The Public-house of Mr. William Prescott, at the corner of St. Vincent-street, London-road.

James Johnson was a pro-rater.

=== North Toxteth ===
No. 16 North Toxteth
Party	Candidate	Votes	%	±%
Conservative	William Fisher	Unopposed	N/A	N/A
Registered electors				
Conservative gain from Whig				

Polling Place : The Public-house, sign of "The Royal Oak", corner of Warwick-street, Park-road.

William Fisher was a pro-rater.

=== Pitt Street ===
No. 8 Pitt Street
Party	Candidate	Votes	%	±%
Conservative	Thomas Robinson *	Unopposed		
Registered electors				
Conservative hold				

Polling Place : The Committee-room of the South Corporation School, in Park-lane.

Thomas Robinson was a pro-rater.

=== Rodney Street ===
No. 10 Rodney Street
Party	Candidate	Votes	%	±%
Conservative	George Booker	Unopposed		
Registered electors				
Conservative hold				

Polling Place : The Shop, near the entrance to the New Arcade, on the west side of Renshaw-street, occupied by Mr. Robert Brassey.

George Booker was a pro-rater.

=== St. Anne Street ===
No. 13 St. Anne Street
Party	Candidate	Votes	%	±%
Conservative	Thomas Poole	138	80%	
Whig	Henry Adams	35	20%	
Majority		103	60%	N/A
Registered electors				
Turnout		173		
Conservative gain from Whig		Swing		

Polling Place : The House of Mr. Thomas Hindle, on the west side of Christian-street

Thomas Pool was a pro-rater.

=== St. Paul's ===
No. 4 St. Paul's
Party	Candidate	Votes	%	±%
Conservative	John Briscoe	185	50.4%	
Whig	John Rowland McGuffie	182	49.6%	
Majority		3	0.8%	N/A
Registered electors				
Turnout		367		
Conservative gain from Whig		Swing		

Polling Place : The House of Mr. Mather, at the northwest corner of St. Paul's-square.

Both candidates were pro-raters.

=== St. Peter's ===
No. 7 St. Peter's
Party	Candidate	Votes	%	±%
Conservative	John Ferguson	268	59%	
Conservative	John Stewart *	184	41%	
Majority		84	18%	N/A
Registered electors				
Turnout		452		
Conservative gain from Conservative		Swing		

Polling Place : The Public-house, sign of "The Horse and Jockey" in Seel-street'

John Ferguson, a determined pro-rater and chairman of the National Federation.

=== Scotland ===
No. 2 Scotland
Party	Candidate	Votes	%	±%
Whig	James Thomson	Unopposed	N/A	N/A
Registered electors				
Whig gain from Conservative				

Polling Place : The House No. 64, on the north side of Burlington-street, near Limekiln-lane, occupied by Mr. Joseph Jones.

James Thomson advocated the rating of the Corporate and Dock estates.

=== South Toxteth ===
No. 15 South Toxteth
Party	Candidate	Votes	%	±%
Whig	Edward Cannon Hindley	Unopposed	N/A	N/A
Registered electors				
Whig gain from Conservative				

Polling Place : The Shop, on the west side of Park-road, occupied by Mrs. Eliza Gould, near the church of St. John the Baptist.

Edward Cannon Hindley was a pro-rater.

=== Vauxhall ===
No. 3 Vauxhall
Party	Candidate	Votes	%	±%
Conservative	Thomas Llewellyn Hodson	123	78%	
Whig	William Rathbone *	35	22%	
Majority		88	56%	N/A
Registered electors				
Turnout		158		
Conservative gain from Whig		Swing		

Polling Place : The House occupied by Mr. George Gurden, on the west side of Vauxhall-road nearly opposite the end of Blackstock-street.

William Rathbone was an advocate of the Rivington Pike water scheme and opposed to the rating of the Corporate and Dock estates. Mr. Hodson took the contrary views.

=== West Derby ===
No. 14 West Derby
Party	Candidate	Votes	%	±%
Whig	Richard Mitchell Beckwith	266	65%	
Conservative	James H. Bourne	141	35%	
Majority		125	30%	N/A
Registered electors				
Turnout		407		
Whig gain from Conservative		Swing		

Polling Place : The House, on the south side of Edge-hill, opposite the Church, in the occupation of Mrs. Mary Fleetwood.

Richard Mitchell Beckwith was a pro-rater.

== See also ==
- Liverpool Town Council elections 1835 - 1879
- Liverpool City Council elections 1880–present
- Mayors and Lord Mayors of Liverpool 1207 to present
- History of local government in England
