= 1844 Liverpool Town Council election =

English local election

← 1843	November 1, 1844	1845 →

16 seats were up for election: one seat for each of the 16 wards 33 (incl. Aldermen) seats needed for a majority

Elections to Liverpool Town Council were held on Wednesday 1 November 1844. One third of the council seats were up for election, the term of office of each councillor being three years.

Seven of the sixteen wards were uncontested.

After the election of Councillors on Friday 1 November 1844 and the Aldermanic election on Saturday 9 November 1844, the composition of the council was:

Party	Councillors	±	Aldermen	Total
Conservative	35	0	16	51
Reformers	10	0	0	10

== Election result ==
Liverpool local election result 1844
Party	Seats	Gains	Losses	Net gain/loss	Seats %	Votes %	Votes	+/−
Conservative	13	1	1	0	81%	56%	2,105	
Whig	3	1	1	0	19%	44%	1,646	

== Ward results ==
* - Retiring Councillor seeking re-election

=== Abercromby ===
No. 11 Abercromby
Party	Candidate	Votes	%	±%
Conservative	James Procter	Unopposed	N/A	N/A
Registered electors		673		
Conservative hold				

=== Castle Street ===
No. 6 Castle Street
Party	Candidate	Votes	%	±%
Whig	John Holmes *	Unopposed	N/A	N/A
Registered electors		821		
Whig hold				

=== Everton ===
No. 1 Everton
Party	Candidate	Votes	%	±%
Conservative	Thomas Shaw *	Unopposed	N/A	N/A
Registered electors		781		
Conservative hold				

=== Exchange ===
No. 5 Exchange
Party	Candidate	Votes	%	±%
Conservative	Charles Stuart Middleton	Unopposed	N/A	N/A
Registered electors		670		
Conservative gain from Whig				

=== Great George ===
No. 9 Great George
Party	Candidate	Votes	%	±%
Conservative	George Green Hornby	136	67%	
Conservative	Robertson Gladstone	67	33%	
Majority		69	34%	
Registered electors		487		
Turnout		203	42%	
Conservative hold		Swing		

=== Lime Street ===
No. 12 Lime Street
Party	Candidate	Votes	%	±%
Conservative	John Buck Lloyd *	324	53%	
Whig	Henry Holmes	292	47%	
Majority		32	6%	
Registered electors		813		
Turnout		616	76%	
Conservative hold		Swing		

=== North Toxteth ===
No. 16 North Toxteth
Party	Candidate	Votes	%	±%
Conservative	William Mann	274	56%	
Whig	George Holt	214	44%	
Majority		60	12%	
Registered electors		877		
Turnout		488	56%	
Conservative hold		Swing		

=== Pitt Street ===
No. 8 Pitt Street
Party	Candidate	Votes	%	±%
Conservative	James Aspinall *	Unopposed	N/A	N/A
Registered electors		536		
Conservative hold				

=== Rodney Street ===
No. 10 Rodney Street
Party	Candidate	Votes	%	±%
Conservative	John Pemberton	273	55%	
Whig	Robert Ellison Harvey	222	45%	
Majority		51	10%	
Registered electors		796		
Turnout		495	62%	
Conservative hold		Swing		

=== St. Anne Street ===
No. 13 St. Anne Street
Party	Candidate	Votes	%	±%
Conservative	James Parker *	231	52%	
Whig	William Earle	216	48%	
Majority		15	4%	
Registered electors		527		
Turnout		447	85%	
Conservative hold		Swing		

=== St. Paul's ===
No. 4 St. Paul's
Party	Candidate	Votes	%	±%
Conservative	Robert Brodhurst Hill	152	56%	
Whig	James Stitt	119	44%	
Majority		33	12%	
Registered electors		388		
Turnout		271	70%	
Conservative hold		Swing		

=== St. Peter's ===
No. 7 St. Peter's
Party	Candidate	Votes	%	±%
Conservative	Robert Sellar Henderson	269	54%	
Whig	Thomas Bolton	230	46%	
Majority		39	12%	
Registered electors		716		
Turnout		499	70%	
Conservative hold		Swing		

=== Scotland ===
No. 2 Scotland
Party	Candidate	Votes	%	±%
Whig	James Brancker	217	52%	
Conservative	Isaac Holmes	204	48%	
Majority		13	4%	N/A
Registered electors		535		
Turnout		421	79%	
Whig gain from Conservative		Swing		

=== South Toxteth ===
No. 15 South Toxteth
Party	Candidate	Votes	%	±%
Conservative	Roger Lyon Jones	175	56%	
Whig	Richard Vaughan Yates	136	44%	
Majority		39	12%	
Registered electors		464		
Turnout		311	67%	
Conservative hold		Swing		

=== Vauxhall ===
No. 3 Vauxhall
Party	Candidate	Votes	%	±%
Whig	William Preston *	Unopposed	N/A	N/A
Registered electors		512		
Whig hold				

=== West Derby ===
No. 14 West Derby
Party	Candidate	Votes	%	±%
Conservative	John Shaw Leigh *	Unopposed	N/A	N/A
Registered electors		590		
Conservative hold				

== Aldermanic Elections ==
On 9 November 1844, the term of office of eight aldermen who were elected on 9 November 1838 expired.

The following were elected as Aldermen by the Council on 9 November 1844 for a term of office of six years.

* - re-elected Alderman.

Party	Alderman
Conservative	David Hodgson
Conservative	Thomas Berry Horsfall
Conservative	James Lawrence *
Conservative	Sir Thomas Brancker *
Conservative	Anthony Swainson
Conservative	John Shaw Leigh
Conservative	William Pratt Bushby
Conservative	Thomas Sands

== See also ==
- Liverpool Town Council elections 1835 - 1879
- Liverpool City Council elections 1880–present
- Mayors and Lord Mayors of Liverpool 1207 to present
- History of local government in England
