= 1847 Liverpool Town Council election =

English local election

- November 1, 1847

16 seats were up for election: one seat for each of the 16 wards 33 (incl. Aldermen) seats needed for a majority

Elections to Liverpool Town Council were held on Wednesday 1 November 1847. One third of the council seats were up for election, the term of office of each councillor being three years.

Four of the sixteen wards were uncontested.

After the annual Council election on 1 November 1847, the Aldermanic election on 9 November 1847 and the four by-elections caused by four Councillors having been elected as Aldermen on 17 November 1847, the composition of the council was:

Party	Councillors	±	Aldermen	±	Total
Conservative	32	−2	15	−1	47
Reformers	16	+2	1	+!	17

== Election result ==
Liverpool local election result 1847
Party	Seats	Gains	Losses	Net gain/loss	Seats %	Votes %	Votes	+/−
Conservative	13	0	2	-2	81%	55%	2,879	
Whig	3	2	0	+2	19%	45%	2,347	

== Ward results ==
* – Retiring Councillor seeking re-election

=== Abercromby ===
No. 11 Abercromby
Party	Candidate	Votes	%	±%
Conservative	James Procter *	Unopposed	N/A	N/A
Registered electors				
Conservative hold				

=== Castle Street ===
No. 6 Castle Street
Party	Candidate	Votes	%	±%
Whig	John Holmes *	Unopposed	N/A	N/A
Registered electors				
Whig hold				

=== Everton ===
No. 1 Everton
Party	Candidate	Votes	%	±%
Whig	William Watthew	283	50.4%	
Conservative	George Green Hornby	278	49.6%	
Majority		5	0.8%	N/A
Registered electors		858		
Turnout		561	65%	
Whig gain from Conservative		Swing		

=== Exchange ===
No. 5 Exchange
Party	Candidate	Votes	%	±%
Conservative	George Henry Horsfall	256	58%	
Whig	William Clare	182	42%	
Majority		74	16%	
Registered electors		748		
Turnout		438	59%	
Conservative hold		Swing		

=== Great George ===
No. 9 Great George
Party	Candidate	Votes	%	±%
Conservative	Henry Gordon Harbord	Unopposed	N/A	N/A
Registered electors		564		
Conservative hold				

=== Lime Street ===
No. 12 Lime Street
Party	Candidate	Votes	%	±%
Conservative	John Buck Lloyd *	312	53%	
Whig	James Allanson Picton	281	47%	
Majority		31	6%	
Registered electors		818		
Turnout		593	72%	
Conservative hold		Swing		

=== North Toxteth ===
No. 16 North Toxteth
Party	Candidate	Votes	%	±%
Conservative	William Mann *	281	55%	
Whig	William Purser Freme	230	45%	
Majority		51	10%	
Registered electors		907		
Turnout		511	56%	
Conservative hold		Swing		

=== Pitt Street ===
No. 8 Pitt Street
Party	Candidate	Votes	%	±%
Conservative	Thomas Rimmer	169	56%	
Whig	James Denton	131	44%	
Majority		38	12%	
Registered electors		476		
Turnout		300	63%	
Conservative hold		Swing		

=== Rodney Street ===
No. 10 Rodney Street
Party	Candidate	Votes	%	±%
Conservative	James Aspinall Tobin	295	63%	
Whig	James Lewin	176	37%	
Majority		119	26%	
Registered electors		781		
Turnout		471	60%	
Conservative hold		Swing		

=== St. Anne Street ===
No. 13 St. Anne Street
Party	Candidate	Votes	%	±%
Conservative	James Parker *	216	55%	
Whig	James Mellor	180	45%	
Majority		36	10%	
Registered electors		491		
Turnout		396	81%	
Conservative hold		Swing		

=== St. Paul's ===
No. 4 St. Paul's
Party	Candidate	Votes	%	±%
Conservative	Robert Brodhurst Hill *	173	57%	
Whig	Thomas Booth	129	43%	
Majority		44	14%	
Registered electors		461		
Turnout		302	66%	
Conservative hold		Swing		

=== St. Peter's ===
No. 7 St. Peter's
Party	Candidate	Votes	%	±%
Conservative	Robert Sellar Henderson *	242	53%	
Whig	Daniel Bell	214	47%	
Majority		28	6%	
Registered electors		725		
Turnout		456	63%	
Conservative hold		Swing		

=== Scotland ===
No. 2 Scotland
Party	Candidate	Votes	%	±%
Conservative	John Woodruff	197	51%	
Whig	James Thompson	190	49%	
Majority		7	2%	
Registered electors		535		
Turnout		387	72%	
Conservative hold		Swing		

=== South Toxteth ===
No. 15 South Toxteth
Party	Candidate	Votes	%	±%
Conservative	Roger Lyon Jones *	219	54%	
Whig	Thomas Avison	184	46%	
Majority		35	8%	
Registered electors		625		
Turnout		403	64%	
Conservative hold		Swing		

=== Vauxhall ===
No. 3 Vauxhall
Party	Candidate	Votes	%	±%
Whig	William Preston *	Unopposed	N/A	N/A
Registered electors		234		
Whig hold				

=== West Derby ===
No. 14 West Derby
Party	Candidate	Votes	%	±%
Conservative	Josias Booker	210	56%	
Whig	Richard Mitchell Beckwith	163	44%	
Majority		47	12%	
Registered electors		661		
Turnout		373	56%	
Conservative hold		Swing		

== Aldermanic Elections ==
On 9 November 1847, the term of office of eight aldermen who were elected on 9 November 1841 expired.

The following were elected as Aldermen by the council on 9 November 1847 for a term of office of six years.

* – re-elected Alderman.

Party	Alderman
Conservative	John Bramley-Moore *
Conservative	Edmund Molyneux *
Conservative	Thomas Chilton *
Reformer	John Holmes
Conservative	William Nicol *
Conservative	James Procter
Conservative	John Nelson Wood
Conservative	Joseph Cooper

== By-elections ==
=== No. 6, Castle Street, Wednesday 17 November 1847 ===
Caused by the election of Councillor John Holmes (Reformer, Castle Street, elected 1 November 1847) as an Alderman on 9 November 1847.

No. 6 Castle Street 17 November 1847
Party	Candidate	Votes	%	±%
Whig	George Holt	Unopposed	N/A	N/A
Registered electors				
Whig hold				

=== No. 9, Great George, Wednesday 17 November 1847 ===
Caused by the election of Councillor Joseph Cooper (Conservative, Great George, elected 1 November 1846) as an Alderman on 9 November 1847.

No. 9 Great George 17 November 1847
Party	Candidate	Votes	%	±%
Whig	John Rogers	177	53%	
Conservative	Mr. Dover	156	47%	
Majority		21	6%	N/A
Registered electors		564		
Turnout		333	59%	
Whig gain from Conservative		Swing		

=== No. 11, Abercromby, Wednesday 17 November 1847 ===
Caused by the election of Councillor James Procter (Conservative, Abercromby, elected 1 November 1847

No. 11 Abercromby 17 November 1847
Party	Candidate	Votes	%	±%
Conservative	Richard Cardwell Gardner	189	51%	
Whig	Robertson Gladstone	183	49%	
Majority		6	2%	
Registered electors		613		
Turnout		372	61%	
Conservative hold		Swing		

=== No. 10, Rodney Street, Wednesday 17 November 1847 ===
Caused by the election of Councillor John Nelson Wood (Conservative, Rodney Street, elected 1 November 1845) as an Alderman on 9 November 1847.

No. 10 Rodney Street 17 November 1847
Party	Candidate	Votes	%	±%
Conservative	George Booker	267	66%	
Whig	Mr. Lewin	140	34%	
Majority		127	32%	
Registered electors		781		
Turnout		407	52%	
Conservative hold		Swing		

== See also ==
- Liverpool Town Council elections 1835 – 1879
- Liverpool City Council elections 1880–present
- Mayors and Lord Mayors of Liverpool 1207 to present
- History of local government in England
