= 1887 Liverpool City Council election =

Liverpool Town Council elections 1887

← 1886	November 1, 1887	1888 →

16 seats were up for election (one third): one seat for each of the 16 wards 33 (incl. Aldermen) seats needed for a majority

Elections to Liverpool City Council were held on Tuesday 1 November 1887. One third of the council seats were up for election, the term of office of each councillor being three years.

Fourteen of the sixteen seats were uncontested.

After the election, the composition of the council was:

Party	Councillors	±	Aldermen	Total
Conservative	??	-1	16	??
Liberal	??	+1	0	??
Irish Home Rule	6	0	0	6

== Election result ==
Liverpool local election result 1887
Party	Seats	Gains	Losses	Net gain/loss	Seats %	Votes %	Votes	+/−
Conservative	9	0	1	-1	56%	51.34%	1,267	
Liberal	5	1	0	+1	31%	48.66%	1,201	
Home Rule	2	0	0	0	12.5%			

== Ward results ==
* - Retiring Councillor seeking re-election

=== Abercromby ===
No. 11 Abercromby
Party	Candidate	Votes	%	±%
Conservative	George Henry Ball	unopposed		
Registered electors				
Conservative hold		Swing		

=== Castle Street ===
No. 6 Castle Street
Party	Candidate	Votes	%	±%
Conservative	Joseph Bond Morgan *	unopposed		
Registered electors				
Conservative hold		Swing		

=== Everton ===
No. 1 Everton
Party	Candidate	Votes	%	±%
Conservative	James Barkeley Smith *	unopposed		
Registered electors				
Conservative hold		Swing		

=== Exchange ===
No. 5 Exchange
Party	Candidate	Votes	%	±%
Liberal	Thomas Holder *	unopposed		
Registered electors				
Liberal hold		Swing		

=== Great George ===
No. 9 Great George
Party	Candidate	Votes	%	±%
Liberal	Edward Paull	431	51%	
Conservative	George Peet *	420	49%	
Majority		11	2%	N/A
Registered electors				
Turnout		851		
Liberal gain from Conservative		Swing		

=== Lime Street ===
No. 12 Lime Street
Party	Candidate	Votes	%	±%
Conservative	Thomas William Oakshott *	unopposed		
Registered electors				
Conservative hold		Swing		

=== North Toxteth ===
No. 16 North Toxteth
Party	Candidate	Votes	%	±%
Conservative	Robert Hamilton *	unopposed		
Registered electors				
Conservative hold		Swing		

=== Pitt Street ===
No. 8 Pitt Street
Party	Candidate	Votes	%	±%
Conservative	Francis Joseph McAdam *	Unopposed	N/A	N/A
Registered electors				
Conservative hold				

=== Rodney Street ===
No. 10 Rodney Street
Party	Candidate	Votes	%	±%
Liberal	Frederick Smith *	Unopposed	N/A	N/A
Registered electors				
Liberal hold				

=== St. Anne Street ===
No. 13 St. Anne Street
Party	Candidate	Votes	%	±%
Conservative	William Clarkson	847	52%	
Liberal	Samuel McMillin	770	48%	
Majority		77	4%	
Registered electors				
Turnout		1,617		
Conservative hold		Swing		

=== St. Paul's ===
No. 4 St. Paul's
Party	Candidate	Votes	%	±%
Conservative	George Curzon Dobell *	unopposed		
Registered electors				
Conservative hold		Swing		

=== St. Peter's ===
No. 7 St. Peter's
Party	Candidate	Votes	%	±%
Liberal	William Benjamin Bowring *	Unopposed	N/A	N/A
Registered electors				
Liberal hold				

=== Scotland ===
No. 2 Scotland
Party	Candidate	Votes	%	±%
Home Rule	Edward Purcell	unopposed		
Registered electors				
Home Rule hold		Swing		

=== South Toxteth ===
No. 15 South Toxteth
Party	Candidate	Votes	%	±%
Conservative	Joseph Ball *	unopposed		
Registered electors				
Conservative hold		Swing		

=== Vauxhall ===
No. 3 Vauxhall
Party	Candidate	Votes	%	±%
Home Rule	Patrick Byrne	unopposed		
Registered electors				
Home Rule hold		Swing		

=== West Derby ===
No. 14 West Derby
Party	Candidate	Votes	%	±%
Conservative	William John Lunt *	unopposed		
Registered electors				
Conservative hold		Swing		

== By-elections ==
=== No. 2 Scotland, 29 December 1887 ===
Caused by the resignation of Cllr. William Madden (Home Rule, elected unopposed 1 November 1886) .

No. 2 Scotland
Party	Candidate	Votes	%	±%
Home Rule	Patrick Edmund O'Hare	unopposed		
Registered electors				
Home Rule hold		Swing		

=== No. 3, Vauxhall, 31 January 1888 ===
Caused by the death of Councillor John Yates (Irish Home Rule, Vauxhall, elected unopposed 1 November 1886) .

No. 3 Vauxhall
Party	Candidate	Votes	%	±%
Home Rule	John Gregory Taggart	unopposed		
Registered electors				
Home Rule hold		Swing		

== See also ==
- Liverpool City Council
- Liverpool Town Council elections 1835 - 1879
- Liverpool City Council elections 1880–present
- Mayors and Lord Mayors of Liverpool 1207 to present
- History of local government in England
