= 1849 Liverpool Town Council election =

English local election

← 1848	November 1, 1849	1850 →

16 seats were up for election: one seat for each of the 16 wards 33 (incl. Aldermen) seats needed for a majority

Elections to Liverpool Town Council were held on Thursday 1 November 1849. One third of the council seats were up for election, the term of office of each councillor being three years.

Eight of the sixteen wards were uncontested.

The major issues were the Rivington Pike Water Scheme and the imposition of rates on the dock and corporation estates. In several wards Candidates with the same party affiliation stood for election against each other over these issues

After the election, the composition of the council was:

Party	Councillors	±	Aldermen	Total
Conservative	??	??	15	??
Reformers	??	??	1	??

== Election result ==
Liverpool local election result 1849
Party	Seats	Gains	Losses	Net gain/loss	Seats %	Votes %	Votes	+/−
Conservative	8				50%	49.7%	1,584	
Whig	8				50%	50.3%	1,601	

Of the sixteen councillors elected, fourteen were opposed to the Rivington Pike water scheme and two were in favour.

== Ward results ==
* - Retiring Councillor seeking re-election

=== Abercromby ===
No. 11 Abercromby
Party	Candidate	Votes	%	±%
Conservative	Bernard Hall	Unopposed	N/A	N/A
Registered electors		733		
Conservative hold				

Bernard Hall was opposed to the Rivington Pike water scheme and in favour of imposing rates on the docks and corporation estate.

=== Castle Street ===
No. 6 Castle Street
Party	Candidate	Votes	%	±%
Whig	Thomas Avison	304	53%	
Whig	James Aikin *	265	47%	
Majority		39	6%	
Registered electors		894		
Turnout		569	64%	
Whig hold		Swing		

Thomas Avison was opposed to the Rivington Pike water scheme, whereas James Aikin was in favour.

=== Everton ===
No. 1 Everton
Party	Candidate	Votes	%	±%
Whig	Thomas Chalmer the younger	Unopposed	N/A	N/A
Registered electors		1,079		
Whig gain from Conservative				

Thomas Chalmer was opposed to the Rivington Pike water scheme.

=== Exchange ===
No. 5 Exchange
Party	Candidate	Votes	%	±%
Conservative	James Tyrer *	Unopposed	N/A	N/A
Registered electors		648		
Conservative hold				

James Tyrer was in favour of the Rivington Pike water scheme and opposed to imposing rates on the docks and corporation estate.

=== Great George ===
No. 9 Great George
Party	Candidate	Votes	%	±%
Whig	John Rogers	Unopposed	N/A	N/A
Registered electors		505		
Whig gain from Conservative				

John Rogers was opposed to the Rivington Pike water scheme and in favour of imposing rates on the docks and corporation estate.

=== Lime Street ===
No. 12 Lime Street
Party	Candidate	Votes	%	±%
Whig	James Allanson Picton	Unopposed	N/A	N/A
Registered electors		784		
Whig hold				

James Allanson Picton was opposed to the Rivington Pike water scheme.

=== North Toxteth ===
No. 16 North Toxteth
Party	Candidate	Votes	%	±%
	Thomas Lloyd	unopposed		
Registered electors		735		
	gain from	Swing		

Thomas Lloyd was opposed to the Rivington Pike water scheme.

=== Pitt Street ===
No. 8 Pitt Street
Party	Candidate	Votes	%	±%
Conservative	Thomas Toulmin *	Unopposed	N/A	N/A
Registered electors		482		
Conservative hold				

Thomas Toulmin was opposed to the Rivington Pike water scheme.

=== Rodney Street ===
No. 10 Rodney Street
Party	Candidate	Votes	%	±%
Conservative	Algernon Frederick Jones	423	71%	
Conservative	Samuel Holmes *	169	29%	
Majority		254	42%	N/A
Registered electors		931		
Turnout		592	64%	
Conservative gain from Conservative		Swing		

Samuel Holmes was in favour of the Rivington Pike water scheme, which Algernon Frederick Jones opposed.

=== St. Anne Street ===
No. 13 St. Anne Street
Party	Candidate	Votes	%	±%
Conservative	William Bennett *	Unopposed	N/A	N/A
Registered electors		470		
Conservative hold				

William Bennett was opposed to the Rivington Pike water scheme.

=== St. Paul's ===
No. 4 St. Paul's
Party	Candidate	Votes	%	±%
Conservative	Thomas Godfrey	137	52%	
Conservative	Dr. John Games	125	48%	
Majority		12	4%	
Registered electors		411		
Turnout		262	64%	
Conservative hold		Swing		

Thomas Godfrey was opposed to the Rivington Pike water scheme and in favour of imposing rates on the dock and council estates, as was Dr. John Games.

=== St. Peter's ===
No. 7 St. Peter's
Party	Candidate	Votes	%	±%
Whig	John Charles Fernihough	227	55%	
Conservative	Thomas Clarke	184	45%	
Majority		43	10%	N/A
Registered electors		730		
Turnout		411	56%	
Whig gain from Conservative		Swing		

John Charles Fernihough and Thomas Clarke were both opposed to the Rivington Pike water scheme.

=== Scotland ===
No. 2 Scotland
Party	Candidate	Votes	%	±%
Whig	John Bingham	301	69%	
Conservative	James Holme *	135	31%	
Majority		166	38%	N/A
Registered electors		675		
Turnout		436	65%	
Whig gain from Conservative		Swing		

John Bingham was opposed to the Rivington Pike water scheme, but James Holme was in favour.

There were two cases of Personation. John Jones of Cazneau-street, who intended to vote for Mr. Bingham, discovered that he had been personated by someone who had voted for James Holme. David Starke of Waterloo-road discovered that someone else had voted for Mr. Bingham in his name.

John Holmes of Dryden-street, gave in his voting paper for Mr. Bingham, but as he walked away before his name was recorded, his vote was lost.

Liverpool Mail Saturday 3 November 1849

=== South Toxteth ===
No. 15 South Toxteth
Party	Candidate	Votes	%	±%
	William Joseph Horsfall	229	62%	
	Richard Harbord	139	38%	
Majority		90		
Registered electors		558		
Turnout		368	66%	
	gain from	Swing		

William Joseph Horsfall was in favour of the Rivington Pike water scheme, whereas Richard Harbord was opposed.

=== Vauxhall ===
No. 3 Vauxhall
Party	Candidate	Votes	%	±%
Conservative	Jonathan Atkinson	106	62%	
Whig	William Rathbone V	66	38%	
Majority		40	24%	
Registered electors		315		
Turnout		172	55%	
Conservative hold		Swing		

Jonathan Atkinson was opposed to the Rivington Pike water scheme, whereas William Rathbone V was in favour.

=== West Derby ===
No. 14 West Derby
Party	Candidate	Votes	%	±%
Whig	Arthur Henderson	214	57%	
Whig	Daniel Mather	85	23%	
Conservative	George Hall Lawrence *	76	20%	
Majority		129		
Registered electors		634		
Turnout		375	59%	
gain from Conservative		Swing		

Arthur Henderson was opposed to the Rivington Pike water scheme, Daniel Mather was a supporter of collecting rates from the dock and council estates.

At about half past two the chairman of Mr. Mather's committee proposed to the chairman of Mr. Henderson's committee that Mr. Mather withdrew from the contest and that "all double votes be sent down to Castle-street ward in favour of Mr. Avison". This was agreed.

== Aldermanic By Election 29 October 1850 ==
At a meeting of the Council on Tuesday 29 October 1850 Cllr. James Parker (Conservative, St. Anne Street, elected 1 November 1847) was elected as an Alderman to take the place of Alderman William Nicol (elected as an Alderman on Tuesday 9 November 1847), who had resigned. As Cllr. Parker's term of office as a Councillor was due to expire on 1 November 1850, there was no need to hold a by election to fill this post, as it would be filled at the municipal elections on 1 November 1850.

== See also ==
- Liverpool Town Council elections 1835 - 1879
- Liverpool City Council elections 1880–present
- Mayors and Lord Mayors of Liverpool 1207 to present
- History of local government in England
