= 1843 Liverpool Town Council election =

English local election

← 1842	1 November 1843	1844 →

16 seats were up for election: one seat for each of the 16 wards 33 (incl. Aldermen) seats needed for a majority

Elections to Liverpool Town Council were held on Wednesday 1 November 1843. One third of the council seats were up for election, the term of office of each councillor being three years.

Two of the sixteen wards were uncontested.

After the election, the composition of the council was:

Party	Councillors	±	Aldermen	Total
Conservative	39	+1	10	49
Reformers	9	-1	6	15

== Election result ==
Liverpool local election result 1843
Party	Seats	Gains	Losses	Net gain/loss	Seats %	Votes %	Votes	+/−
Conservative	12	2	1	+1	75%	53%	2,914	
Whig	4	1	2	-1	25%	44%	2,385	

== Ward results ==
* - Retiring Councillor seeking re-election

=== Abercromby ===
No. 11 Abercromby
Party	Candidate	Votes	%	±%
Conservative	Charles Boutflower	195	56%	
Conservative	Daniel Neilson	154	44%	
Majority		195	12%	
Registered electors		683		
Turnout		349	51%	
Conservative hold		Swing		

Although both candidates were Conservative, Charles Boutflower "promised to support the exclusive system at the Corporation Schools", whilst Daniel Neilson stood in opposition to this stance.

Polling Place : A Booth in the Joiner's Yard of Thomas Bag?, on the east side of Mount-pleasant, nearly opposite the fever ward.

=== Castle Street ===
No. 6 Castle Street
Party	Candidate	Votes	%	±%
Whig	James Aikin *	Unopposed	N/A	N/A
Registered electors		712		
Whig hold				

Polling Place : The House, formerly the Queen's Arms Hotel, Castle-street.

=== Everton ===
No. 1 Everton
Party	Candidate	Votes	%	±%
Conservative	David Hodgson *	221	64%	
Whig	Christopher Rawdon	123	36%	
Majority		98	28%	
Registered electors		907		
Turnout		344	38%	
Conservative hold		Swing		

Polling Place : Halliday's Everton Coffee House, Everton.

=== Exchange ===
No. 5 Exchange
Party	Candidate	Votes	%	±%
Conservative	Thomas Sands *	240	60%	
Whig	George Holt	157	40%	
Majority		83	20%	
Registered electors		666		
Turnout		397	60%	
Conservative hold		Swing		

Polling Place : The north end of the Sessions'-house, in Chapel-street.

=== Great George ===
No. 9 Great George
Party	Candidate	Votes	%	±%
Conservative	John Sothern	158	71%	
Whig	Thomas Taylor	64	29%	
Majority		94	42%	
Registered electors		499		
Turnout		222	44%	
Conservative hold		Swing		

Polling Place : The Shop, No. 64, on the north side of Nelson-street, occupied by Mr. Richard Hesketh.

=== Lime Street ===
No. 12 Lime Street
Party	Candidate	Votes	%	±%
Conservative	John Kilshaw	337	50.2%	
Whig	Thomas Morecroft	334	49.8%	
Majority		3	0.4%	
Registered electors		840		
Turnout		671	80%	
Conservative hold		Swing		

Polling Place : The Public-house of William Precott, at the corner of St. Vincent-street, London Road.

=== North Toxteth ===
No. 16 North Toxteth
Party	Candidate	Votes	%	±%
Conservative	Richard Harbord *	222	53%	
Whig	William Lockerby	193	47%	
Majority		29	6%	
Registered electors		657		
Turnout		415	63%	
Conservative hold		Swing		

Polling Place : A Booth, on the Land situated on the east side of Park-road, and south side of St. Patrick's Chapel.

=== Pitt Street ===
No. 8 Pitt Street
Party	Candidate	Votes	%	±%
Conservative	Thomas Toulmin *	211	55%	
Whig	Robert Benn	173	45%	
Majority		38	10%	
Registered electors		516		
Turnout		384	74%	
Conservative hold		Swing		

Polling Place : The Committee-room of the South Corporation School, in Park-lane.

=== Rodney Street ===
No. 10 Rodney Street
Party	Candidate	Votes	%	±%
Conservative	William Birkett *	279	52%	
Whig	William Lassell	261	48%	
Majority		18	4%	
Registered electors		799		
Turnout		540	68%	
Conservative hold		Swing		

Polling Place : The Shop near the entrance of the New Arcade, on the west side of Renshaw-street, occupied by Mr. Bryson.

=== St. Anne Street ===
No. 13 St. Anne Street
Party	Candidate	Votes	%	±%
Whig	Joseph Hornby	210	55%	
Conservative	H. G. Harbord	174	45%	
Majority		36	10%	
Registered electors		511		
Turnout		384	75%	
Whig hold		Swing		

Polling Place : The House of William Dyer, No. 52, on the south side of Christian-street

=== St. Paul's ===
No. 4 St. Paul's
Party	Candidate	Votes	%	±%
Conservative	Richard Benson Blundell Hollinshead Blundell *	179	52%	
Whig	John Deakin	162	48%	
Majority		17	4%	
Registered electors		423		
Turnout		341	81%	
Conservative hold		Swing		

Polling Place : Mr. Mather's Baths, at the north west corner of St. Paul's-square.

=== St. Peter's ===
No. 7 St. Peter's
Party	Candidate	Votes	%	±%
Conservative	J. A. Tinne	264	53%	
Whig	Thomas Bolton	233	47%	
Majority		31	6%	N/A
Registered electors		701		
Turnout		497	71%	
Conservative gain from Whig		Swing		

Polling Place : The Horse and Jockey, in Seel-street.

=== Scotland ===
No. 2 Scotland
Party	Candidate	Votes	%	±%
Whig	William Thornhill *	227	50.4%	
Conservative	Thomas Vernon	223	49.6%	
Majority		4	0.8%	
Registered electors		563		
Turnout		450	80%	
Whig hold		Swing		

Polling Place : The House, No. 61, on the south side of Burlington Street, near Limekiln-lane occupied by Mrs. Bell.

=== South Toxteth ===
No. 15 South Toxteth
Party	Candidate	Votes	%	±%
Conservative	T. T. Glazebrook	118	50.2%	
Whig	John Platt *	117	49.8%	
Majority		1	0.4%	N/A
Registered electors		687		
Turnout		235	34%	
Conservative gain from Whig		Swing		

Polling Place : The Shop on the west side of Park-road, occupied by William McCartney, near the Church of John the Baptist.

=== Vauxhall ===
No. 3 Vauxhall
Party	Candidate	Votes	%	±%
Whig	Thomas Chalmer	131	58%	
Conservative	Thomas Case	93	42%	
Majority		38	16%	N/A
Registered electors		563		
Turnout		224	40%	
Whig gain from Conservative		Swing		

Polling Place : The House occupied by Edward Ashort, nearly opposite the end of Naylor-street, being on the west side of Vauxhall-road.

=== West Derby ===
No. 14 West Derby
Party	Candidate	Votes	%	±%
Conservative	George Hall Lawrence *	Unopposed	N/A	N/A
Registered electors		453		
Conservative hold				

Polling Place : The House on the south side of Edge-hill, opposite the Church in the occupation of Mr. Thomas Proctor.

== See also ==
- Liverpool Town Council elections 1835 - 1879
- Liverpool City Council elections 1880–present
- Mayors and Lord Mayors of Liverpool 1207 to present
- History of local government in England
