= 1886 Liverpool City Council election =

Liverpool Town Council elections 1886

← 1886	November 1, 1886	1887 →

16 seats were up for election (one third): one seat for each of the 16 wards 33 (incl. Aldermen) seats needed for a majority

Elections to Liverpool City Council were held on Tuesday 1 November 1886. One third of the council seats were up for election, the term of office of each councillor being three years.

After the election, the composition of the council was:

Party	Councillors	±	Aldermen	Total
Conservative	??	+4	16	??
Liberal	??	-6	0	??
Irish Home Rule	5	+2	0	5
Irish Nationalists	1	0	0	1

== Election result ==
Liverpool local election result 1886
Party	Seats	Gains	Losses	Net gain/loss	Seats %	Votes %	Votes	+/−
Conservative	12	4	0	+4	75%	55%	3,805	
Liberal	2	0	6	-6	12.5%	45%	3,103	
Home Rule	2	2	0	+2	12.5%			

== Ward results ==
* - Retiring Councillor seeking re-election

=== Abercromby ===
No. 11 Abercromby
Party	Candidate	Votes	%	±%
Conservative	Thomas Menlove	903	60%	
Liberal	Thomas Goffey	606	40%	
Majority		297	20%	N/A
Registered electors		2,323		
Turnout		1,509	65%	
Conservative gain from Liberal		Swing		

=== Castle Street ===
No. 6 Castle Street
Party	Candidate	Votes	%	±%
Conservative	James Marke Wood *	unopposed		
Registered electors				
Conservative hold		Swing		

=== Everton ===
No. 1 Everton
Party	Candidate	Votes	%	±%
Conservative	Edward Whitley MP *	Unopposed	N/A	N/A
Registered electors				
Conservative hold				

=== Exchange ===
No. 5 Exchange
Party	Candidate	Votes	%	±%
Liberal	Robert Durning Holt *	Unopposed	N/A	N/A
Registered electors				
Liberal hold				

=== Great George ===
No. 9 Great George
Party	Candidate	Votes	%	±%
Conservative	Thomas Bird Hall	400	51%	
Liberal	Edward Paull	389	49%	
Majority		11	2%	
Registered electors		1,132		
Turnout		789	70%	
Conservative hold		Swing		

=== Lime Street ===
No. 12 Lime Street
Party	Candidate	Votes	%	±%
Conservative	James Duncan the younger	unopposed		
Registered electors				
Conservative gain from		Swing		

=== North Toxteth ===
No. 16 North Toxteth
Party	Candidate	Votes	%	±%
Conservative	Herbert Campbell	unopposed		
Registered electors				
Conservative hold		Swing		

=== Pitt Street ===
No. 8 Pitt Street
Party	Candidate	Votes	%	±%
Liberal	Henry Charles Hawley *	327	57%	
Conservative	Ephraim Walker	246	43%	
Majority		81	14%	
Registered electors		785		
Turnout		573	73%	
Liberal hold		Swing		

=== Rodney Street ===
No. 10 Rodney Street
Party	Candidate	Votes	%	±%
Conservative	Matthew Henry Larmor	809	56%	
Liberal	John McDiarmid *	626	40%	
Majority		183	16%	N/A
Registered electors		2,403		
Turnout		1,435	60%	
Conservative gain from Liberal		Swing		

=== St. Anne Street ===
No. 13 St. Anne Street
Party	Candidate	Votes	%	±%
Conservative	Dr. William Cross *	889	60%	
Liberal	John Prendeville	600	40%	
Majority		289	20%	
Registered electors		2,234		
Turnout		1,489	67%	
Conservative hold		Swing		

=== St. Paul's ===
No. 4 St. Paul's
Party	Candidate	Votes	%	±%
Conservative	Sylvester Mattison	unopposed		
Registered electors				
Conservative gain from Liberal		Swing		

=== St. Peter's ===
No. 7 St. Peter's
Party	Candidate	Votes	%	±%
Conservative	Isaac Morris	558	50%	
Liberal	Edmund Knowles Muspratt *	555	50%	
Majority		3	0%	N/A
Registered electors		1,523		
Turnout		1,113	73%	
Conservative gain from Liberal		Swing		

=== Scotland ===
No. 2 Scotland
Party	Candidate	Votes	%	±%
Home Rule	William Madden	unopposed		
Registered electors				
Home Rule gain from Liberal		Swing		

=== South Toxteth ===
No. 15 South Toxteth
Party	Candidate	Votes	%	±%
Conservative	Thomas Bland Royden M.P. *	Unopposed	N/A	N/A
Registered electors				
Conservative hold				

=== Vauxhall ===
No. 3 Vauxhall
Party	Candidate	Votes	%	±%
Home Rule	John Yates *	unopposed		
Registered electors				
Home Rule gain from Liberal		Swing		

=== West Derby ===
No. 14 West Derby
Party	Candidate	Votes	%	±%
Conservative	James Poole *	unopposed		
Registered electors				
Conservative hold		Swing		

== Aldermanic Election ==
At the meeting of the Council on 9 November 1886, the terms of office of eight alderman expired. The following eight were elected as Aldermen by the Council (Aldermen and Councillors) on 9 November 1886 for a term of six years.

* - re-elected aldermen.

Party	Alderman
Conservative	William Cross
Conservative	John Hughes *
Conservative	Henry Jennings *
Conservative	Joseph Gibbons Livingston *
Conservative	David MacIver *
Conservative	Hugh Hathorn Nicholson *
Conservative	Thomas Richard Shallcross *
Conservative	Sir Andrew Barclay Walker

== By-elections ==
=== No. 2, Scotland, Tuesday 2 November 1886 ===
Caused by the resignation of Cllr. Laurence Connolly MP (Irish Home Rule, Scotland, elected 1 November 1884).

No. 2 Scotland
Party	Candidate	Votes	%	±%
Home Rule	Edward Purcell	1,237	51%	
	Patrick Edmund O'Hare	1,175	49%	
Majority		62		
Registered electors				
Turnout		2,412		
Home Rule hold		Swing		

=== No. 13, St. Anne's Street, 23 November 1886 ===
Caused by the election of Dr. William Cross (Conservative, St. Anne's Street, elected 1 November 1886) as an alderman by the Council on 9 November 1886.

No. 13 St. Anne's Street
Party	Candidate	Votes	%	±%
	William Bennett	841	54%	
	John Prendiville	710	46%	
Majority		131		
Registered electors		2,234		
Turnout		1,551	69%	
		Swing		

=== No. 11, Abercromby ===
Alderman John Pearson died on 2 June 1887. Councillor Anthony Bower (Conservative, Abercromby, elected 1 November 1884) was elected by the council as an alderman on 6 July 1887.

== See also ==
- Liverpool City Council
- Liverpool Town Council elections 1835 - 1879
- Liverpool City Council elections 1880–present
- Mayors and Lord Mayors of Liverpool 1207 to present
- History of local government in England
