= 1842 Liverpool Town Council election =

English local election

← 1841	November 1, 1842	1843 →

16 seats were up for election: one seat for each of the 16 wards 33 (incl. Aldermen) seats needed for a majority

Elections to Liverpool Town Council were held on Tuesday 1 November 1842. One third of the council seats were up for election, the term of office of each councillor being three years.

Three of the sixteen wards were uncontested.

After the election, the composition of the council was:

Party	Councillors	±	Aldermen	Total
Conservative	38	+5	9	47
Reformers	10	-5	7	17

== Election result ==
Liverpool local election result 1842
Party	Seats	Gains	Losses	Net gain/loss	Seats %	Votes %	Votes	+/−
Conservative	13	6	1	+5	81%	60%	2,793	
Whig	3	1	6	-5	19%	40%	1,839	

== Ward results ==
* - Retiring Councillor seeking re-election

=== Abercromby ===
No. 11 Abercromby
Party	Candidate	Votes	%	±%
Conservative	Christopher Bushell *	172	88%	
Whig	John Downey	24	12%	
Majority		148	76%	
Registered electors		696		
Turnout		196	28%	
Conservative hold		Swing		

Time	Christopher Bushell		John Downey	
Time	Votes	%	Votes	%
10:00				
11:00	74	93%	6	8%
12:00				
13:00	86	90%	10	10%
14:00	123	87%	18	13%
15:00				
16:00	172	88%	24	12%

=== Castle Street ===
No. 6 Castle Street
Party	Candidate	Votes	%	±%
Whig	Hugh Hornby	312	53%	
Conservative	Thomas Twanbrook Glazebrooke	277	47%	
Majority		35	6%	
Registered electors		795		
Turnout		589	74%	
Whig hold		Swing		

Time	Hugh Hornby		Thomas Twanbrook Glazebrooke	
Time	Votes	%	Votes	%
10:00	62	52%	57	48%
11:00	109	53%	98	47%
12:00	126	52%	118	48%
13:00	164	54%	141	46%
14:00	198	54%	170	46%
15:00	237	52%	221	48%
16:00	312	53%	277	47%

=== Everton ===
No. 1 Everton
Party	Candidate	Votes	%	±%
Conservative	Francis Shand	Unopposed	N/A	N/A
Registered electors		760		
Conservative gain from Whig				

=== Exchange ===
No. 5 Exchange
Party	Candidate	Votes	%	±%
Conservative	John North	Unopposed	N/A	N/A
Registered electors		694		
Conservative gain from Whig				

=== Great George ===
No. 9 Great George
Party	Candidate	Votes	%	±%
Conservative	Thomas Royden	177	66%	
Whig	Edward Chaloner	90	34%	
Majority		87	32%	N/A
Registered electors		473		
Turnout		267	56%	
Conservative gain from Whig				

Time	Thomas Royden		Edward Chaloner	
Time	Votes	%	Votes	%
10:00	69	78%	19	22%
11:00	98	77%	30	23%
12:00	120	69%	53	31%
13:00	134	68%	64	32%
14:00	157	68%	74	32%
15:00	166	67%	82	33%
16:00	177	66%	90	34%

=== Lime Street ===
No. 12 Lime Street
Party	Candidate	Votes	%	±%
Conservative	Robert Rigby *	313	57%	
Whig	Thomas Morecroft	236	43%	
Majority		77	14%	
Registered electors		855		
Turnout		549	64%	
Conservative hold		Swing		

Time	Robert Rigby		Thomas Morecroft	
Time	Votes	%	Votes	%
10:00	42	53%	37	47%
11:00	84	53%	78	48%
12:00	120	54%	101	46%
13:00	159	56%	123	44%
14:00	226	58%	164	42%
15:00	245	58%	175	42%
16:00	313	57%	236	43%

=== North Toxteth ===
No. 16 North Toxteth
Party	Candidate	Votes	%	±%
Conservative	John Sheppard	278	65%	
Whig	William Lockerby	149	35%	
Majority		129	30%	N/A
Registered electors		946		
Turnout		427	45%	
Conservative gain from Whig		Swing		

Time	John Sheppard		William Lockerby	
Time	Votes	%	Votes	%
10:00	32	52%	30	48%
11:00	61	54%	53	64%
12:00	76	55%	61	45%
13:00	126	61%	80	39%
14:00	175	64%	100	36%
15:00	216	63%	128	37%
16:00	278	65%	149	35%

=== Pitt Street ===
No. 8 Pitt Street
Party	Candidate	Votes	%	±%
Whig	William Fawcett	190	53%	
Conservative	John Taylor	171	47%	
Majority		19	6%	
Registered electors		484		
Turnout		361	75%	
Whig hold		Swing		

Time	William Fawcett		John Taylor	
Time	Votes	%	Votes	%
10:00	51	57%	39	43%
11:00	76	56%	60	44%
12:00	87	57%	66	43%
13:00	107	56%	83	44%
14:00	138	54%	116	46%
15:00	160	52%	145	48%
16:00	190	53%	171	47%

=== Rodney Street ===
No. 10 Rodney Street
Party	Candidate	Votes	%	±%
Conservative	John Nelson Wood *	217	62%	
Whig	James Mulleneux	132	38%	
Majority		85	24%	
Registered electors		699		
Turnout		349	50%	
Conservative hold		Swing		

Time	John Nelson Wood		James Mulleneux		Votes	%	Votes	%
Time	10:00	46	62%	28	38%			
11:00	97	64%	54	36%				
12:00	107	58%	76	42%				
13:00	133	61%	85	39%				
14:00	158	60%	104	40%				
15:00								
16:00	217	62%	132	38%				

=== St. Anne Street ===
No. 13 St. Anne Street
Party	Candidate	Votes	%	±%
Conservative	Robert Jones jun. *	210	51%	
Whig	Robert Ellison Harvey	202	49%	
Majority		8	2%	
Registered electors		545		
Turnout		412	76%	
Conservative hold		Swing		

Time	Robert Jones jun.		Robert Ellison Harvey	
Time	Votes	%	Votes	%
10:00	29	53%	26	47%
11:00	48	51%	47	49%
12:00	77	52%	71	48%
13:00	102	53%	92	47%
14:00	124	50%	122	50%
15:00	164	52%	151	48%
16:00	210	51%	202	49%

=== St. Paul's ===
No. 4 St. Paul's
Party	Candidate	Votes	%	±%
Conservative	John Caton Thompson	186	53%	
Whig	John Deakin	165	47%	
Majority		21	6%	
Registered electors		477		
Turnout		351	74%	
Conservative hold		Swing		

Time	John Caton Thompson		John Deakin	
Time	Votes	%	Votes	%
10:00	30	71%	12	29%
11:00	59	60%	40	40%
12:00	91	58%	66	42%
13:00	116	59%	81	41%
14:00	143	56%	113	44%
15:00	150	53%	131	47%
16:00	186	53%	165	47%

=== St. Peter's ===
No. 7 St. Peter's
Party	Candidate	Votes	%	±%
Conservative	Samuel Holme	252	65%	
Whig	Adam Cliff	137	35%	
Majority		115	30%	N/A
Registered electors		682		
Turnout		389	57%	
Conservative gain from Whig		Swing		

Time	Samuel Holme		Adam Cliff	
Time	Votes	%	Votes	%
10:00	64	70%	28	30%
11:00	108	67%	53	33%
12:00	145	63%	85	37%
13:00	173	63%	103	37%
14:00	195	63%	117	38%
15:00	214	63%	126	37%
16:00	252	65%	137	35%

=== Scotland ===
No. 2 Scotland
Party	Candidate	Votes	%	±%
Conservative	Richard Houghton junr *	Unopposed	N/A	N/A
Registered electors		536		
Conservative hold				

=== South Toxteth ===
No. 15 South Toxteth
Party	Candidate	Votes	%	±%
Conservative	Ambrose Lace	142	69%	
Whig	Francis Jordan *	64	31%	
Majority		78	38%	N/A
Registered electors		385		
Turnout		206	54%	
Conservative gain from Whig		Swing		

Time	Ambrose Lace		Francis Jordan	
Time	Votes	%	Votes	%
10:00				
11:00	53	72%	21	28%
12:00	63	73%	23	27%
13:00	80	74%	28	26%
14:00	103	74%	36	26%
15:00	106	71%	43	29%
16:00	142	69%	64	31%

=== Vauxhall ===
No. 3 Vauxhall
Party	Candidate	Votes	%	±%
Whig	Thomas Blackburn	138	57%	
Conservative	Thomas Case	104	43%	
Majority		34	14%	N/A
Registered electors		332		
Turnout		242	73%	
Whig gain from Conservative		Swing		

Time	Thomas Blackburn		Thomas Case	
Time	Votes	%	Votes	%
10:00	22	69%	10	31%
11:00	49	62%	30	38%
12:00	67	56%	53	44%
13:00	77	53%	69	47%
14:00	108	57%	80	43%
15:00	122	58%	90	42%
16:00	138	57%	104	43%

=== West Derby ===
No. 14 West Derby
Party	Candidate	Votes	%	±%
Conservative	James Plumpton	182	62%	
Conservative	John Smith *	112	38%	
Majority		70	24%	
Registered electors		497		
Turnout		294	59%	
Conservative hold		Swing		

Time	James Plumpton		John Smith	
Time	Votes	%	Votes	%
10:00	77	67	38	33%
11:00	101	63%	60	37%
12:00	113	60%	75	40%
13:00	134	61%	87	39%
14:00	153	62%	95	38%
15:00	162	61%	105	39%
16:00	182	62%	112	38%

James Plumpton, unlike John Smith, was an advocate for scriptural education in the Corporation Schools.

== See also ==
- Liverpool Town Council elections 1835 - 1879
- Liverpool City Council elections 1880–present
- Mayors and Lord Mayors of Liverpool 1207 to present
- History of local government in England
