= 1841 Liverpool Town Council election =

English local election

| ← 1840 | 1 November 1841 | 1842 → |

16 seats were up for election: one seat for each of the 16 wards 33 (incl. Aldermen) seats needed for a majority
- Registered: 9,214
- Turnout: %
| | First party | Second party |
|---|---|---|
| | Conservative | Reformers |
| Leader | ? |
| Party | Conservative | Reformers |
| Seats before | 27 | 21 |
| Seats won | 34 | 14 |
| Seat change | ▲7 | ▼7 |
| Popular vote | 4,270 | 3,672 |
| Percentage | 54% | 46% |
| Swing | ▲3 | ▼3 |
Council Leader before election
Reformers
Council Leader after election
Conservative

Elections to Liverpool Town Council were held on Monday 1 November 1841. One third of the council seats were up for election, the term of office of each councillor being three years.

There were a total of 12,097 registered electors for the entire borough in 1841. The census of 1841 recorded the population of the borough as 293,963 (exclusive of about 10,000 seamen). These figures revealing that only about 4% of the population were enfranchised. (Although the census figures includes children, which skews the figures to some extent).

| | 1841 Census Population | 1841 electorate | % enfranchised |
| Parish of Liverpool | 222,954 | 9,214 | 4.1% |
| Everton & Kirkdale | 9,148 & 3,779 | 820 | 6.3% |
| West Derby | 16,902 | 568 | 3.4% |
| Toxteth Park | 41,180 | 1,495 | 3.6% |
| Borough of Liverpool | 293,963 | 12,097 | 4.1% |

Three of the sixteen wards were uncontested.

After the election of 16 Councillors on 1 November 1841, and the election of 8 Aldermen on 9 November 1841, the composition of the council was:

| Party | Councillors | ± | Aldermen | ± | Total |
|---|---|---|---|---|---|
| Conservative | 34 | +7 | 8 | +8 | 42 |
| Reformers | 14 | -7 | 8 | -8 | 22 |

== Election result ==
Liverpool local election result 1841
| Party | Seats | Gains | Losses | Net gain/loss | Seats % | Votes % | Votes | +/− |
|---|---|---|---|---|---|---|---|---|
| Conservative | 13 | 7 | 0 | +7 | 81% | 54% | 4,270 | |
| Whig | 3 | 0 | 7 | -7 | 19% | 46% | 3,672 | |

== Ward results ==
* - Retiring Councillor seeking re-election

=== Abercromby ===
No. 11 Abercromby
| Party | Candidate | Votes | % | ±% |
|---|---|---|---|---|
| Conservative | Robertson Gladstone * | 388 | 60% | |
| Whig | John Cooper | 257 | 40% | |
| Majority | | 131 | 20% | |
| Registered electors | | 882 | | |
| Turnout | | 645 | 73% | |
| Conservative hold | | Swing | | |

=== Castle Street ===
No. 6 Castle Street
| Party | Candidate | Votes | % | ±% |
|---|---|---|---|---|
| Whig | John Holmes | Unopposed | N/A | N/A |
| Registered electors | | 814 | | |
| Whig hold | | | | |

=== Everton ===
No. 1 Everton
| Party | Candidate | Votes | % | ±% |
|---|---|---|---|---|
| Conservative | Thomas Shaw | 330 | 62% | |
| Whig | Michael Ashcroft | 203 | 38% | |
| Majority | | 127 | 24% | N/A |
| Registered electors | | 820 | | |
| Turnout | | 533 | 65% | |
| Conservative gain from Whig | | Swing | | |

=== Exchange ===
No. 5 Exchange
| Party | Candidate | Votes | % | ±% |
|---|---|---|---|---|
| Whig | Henry Holmes * | 329 | 52% | |
| Conservative | John Ridgway | 300 | 48% | |
| Majority | | 29 | 4% | |
| Registered electors | | 804 | | |
| Turnout | | 629 | 78% | |
| Whig hold | | Swing | | |

=== Great George ===
No. 9 Great George
| Party | Candidate | Votes | % | ±% |
|---|---|---|---|---|
| Conservative | James Lawrence * | 344 | 51% | |
| Whig | William Rathbone | 324 | 49% | |
| Majority | | 20 | 2% | |
| Registered electors | | 768 | | |
| Turnout | | 668 | 87% | |
| Conservative hold | | Swing | | |

=== Lime Street ===
No. 12 Lime Street
| Party | Candidate | Votes | % | ±% |
|---|---|---|---|---|
| Conservative | John Buck Lloyd | 424 | 50.5% | |
| Whig | Thomas Moorecroft * | 416 | 49.5% | |
| Majority | | 8 | 1.0% | N/A |
| Registered electors | | 1,011 | | |
| Turnout | | 840 | 83% | |
| Conservative gain from Whig | | Swing | | |

=== North Toxteth ===
No. 16 North Toxteth
| Party | Candidate | Votes | % | ±% |
|---|---|---|---|---|
| Conservative | Alexander Smith jun. | 374 | 53% | |
| Whig | William Lockerby | 338 | 47% | |
| Majority | | 36 | 6% | N/A |
| Registered electors | | 964 | | |
| Turnout | | 712 | 74% | |
| Conservative gain from Whig | | Swing | | |

=== Pitt Street ===
No. 8 Pitt Street
| Party | Candidate | Votes | % | ±% |
|---|---|---|---|---|
| Conservative | James Aspinall | 317 | 54% | |
| Whig | Hugh Hornby * | 275 | 46% | |
| Majority | | 42 | 8% | N/A |
| Registered electors | | 768 | | |
| Turnout | | 592 | 77% | |
| Conservative gain from Whig | | Swing | | |

=== Rodney Street ===
No. 10 Rodney Street
| Party | Candidate | Votes | % | ±% |
|---|---|---|---|---|
| Conservative | Henry Lawrence | 345 | 56% | |
| Whig | Charles Holland | 274 | 44% | |
| Majority | | 71 | 12% | N/A |
| Registered electors | | 884 | | |
| Turnout | | 619 | 70% | |
| Conservative gain from Whig | | Swing | | |

=== St. Anne Street ===
No. 13 St. Anne Street
| Party | Candidate | Votes | % | ±% |
|---|---|---|---|---|
| Conservative | James Parker | 276 | 57% | |
| Whig | Thomas Chalmers | 206 | 43% | |
| Majority | | 70 | 14% | N/A |
| Registered electors | | 619 | | |
| Turnout | | 482 | 78% | |
| Conservative gain from Whig | | Swing | | |

=== St. Paul's ===
No. 4 St. Paul's
| Party | Candidate | Votes | % | ±% |
|---|---|---|---|---|
| Conservative | Joshua Edwards | 306 | 54% | |
| Whig | Christopher Rawdon | 263 | 46% | |
| Majority | | 43 | 8% | |
| Registered electors | | 771 | | |
| Turnout | | 569 | 80% | |
| Conservative hold | | Swing | | |

=== St. Peter's ===
No. 7 St. Peter's
| Party | Candidate | Votes | % | ±% |
|---|---|---|---|---|
| Conservative | Ebenezer Rae | 312 | 52% | |
| Whig | John Woollright * | 287 | 48% | |
| Majority | | 25 | 4% | N/A |
| Registered electors | | 721 | | |
| Turnout | | 599 | 83% | |
| Conservative gain from Whig | | Swing | | |

=== Scotland ===
No. 2 Scotland
| Party | Candidate | Votes | % | ±% |
|---|---|---|---|---|
| Conservative | Isaac Holmes * | 313 | 51% | |
| Whig | George Quayle | 303 | 49% | |
| Majority | | 10 | 2% | |
| Registered electors | | 720 | | |
| Turnout | | 616 | 86% | |
| Conservative hold | | Swing | | |

=== South Toxteth ===
No. 15 South Toxteth
| Party | Candidate | Votes | % | ±% |
|---|---|---|---|---|
| Conservative | Simon Lee Trotman | 241 | 55% | |
| Whig | William H. Taylour | 197 | 45% | |
| Majority | | 44 | 10% | N/A |
| Registered electors | | 531 | | |
| Turnout | | 438 | 82% | |
| Conservative gain from Whig | | Swing | | |

=== Vauxhall ===
No. 3 Vauxhall
| Party | Candidate | Votes | % | ±% |
|---|---|---|---|---|
| Whig | William Preston | Unopposed | N/A | N/A |
| Registered electors | | 512 | | |
| Whig gain from Conservative | | | | |

=== West Derby ===
No. 14 West Derby
| Party | Candidate | Votes | % | ±% |
|---|---|---|---|---|
| Conservative | John Shaw Leigh * | Unopposed | N/A | N/A |
| Registered electors | | 568 | | |
| Conservative hold | | | | |

== Aldermanic Elections ==
On 9 November 1841, the term of office of eight of the sixteen aldermen expired.

The following were elected as Aldermen by the council on 9 November 1841 for a term of office of six years.

* - re-elected Alderman.

| Party | Alderman |
|---|---|
| Conservative | William Nicol |
| Conservative | John Bramley-Moore |
| Conservative | Thomas Chilton |
| Conservative | Richard Smethurst Crook |
| Conservative | John Haywood Turner |
| Conservative | Richard Houghton sen. |
| Conservative | Edmund Molyneux |
| Conservative | Richard Griffith |

== See also ==
- Liverpool Town Council elections 1835 - 1879
- Liverpool City Council elections 1880–present
- Mayors and Lord Mayors of Liverpool 1207 to present
- History of local government in England
