= 1845 Liverpool Town Council election =

1845 English local government election

← 1844	November 1, 1845	1846 →

16 seats were up for election: one seat for each of the 16 wards 33 (incl. Aldermen) seats needed for a majority

Elections to Liverpool Town Council were held on Wednesday 1 November 1845. One third of the council seats were up for election, the term of office of each councillor being three years.

Ten of the sixteen wards were uncontested.

After the election, the composition of the council was:

Party	Councillors	±	Aldermen	Total
Conservative	35	-3	16	51
Reformers	13	+3	0	13

== Election result ==
Liverpool local election result 1845
Party	Seats	Gains	Losses	Net gain/loss	Seats %	Votes %	Votes	+/−
Conservative	10	1	4	-3	63%	49%	1,273	
Whig	6	4	1	+3	17%	51%	1,317	

Given that ten of the sixteen seats were uncontested, these statistics should be taken in that context.

== Ward results ==
* - Retiring Councillor seeking re-election

=== Abercromby ===
No. 11 Abercromby
Party	Candidate	Votes	%	±%
Conservative	Charles William Reade	Unopposed	N/A	N/A
Registered electors				
Conservative hold				

=== Castle Street ===
No. 6 Castle Street
Party	Candidate	Votes	%	±%
Whig	Hugh Hornby *	Unopposed	N/A	N/A
Registered electors				
Whig hold				

=== Everton ===
No. 1 Everton
Party	Candidate	Votes	%	±%
Conservative	Francis Shand *	Unopposed	N/A	N/A
Registered electors				
Conservative hold				

=== Exchange ===
No. 5 Exchange
Party	Candidate	Votes	%	±%
Conservative	Thomas Littledale jun	Unopposed	N/A	N/A
Registered electors				
Conservative hold		Swing		

=== Great George ===
No. 9 Great George
Party	Candidate	Votes	%	±%
Conservative	Thomas Royden *	Unopposed	N/A	N/A
Registered electors				
Conservative hold				

=== Lime Street ===
No. 12 Lime Street
Party	Candidate	Votes	%	±%
Whig	Vincent Higgins	324	56%	
Conservative	Robert Rigby *	252	44%	
Majority		72	12%	N/A
Registered electors				
Turnout		576		
Whig gain from Conservative		Swing		

=== North Toxteth ===
No. 16 North Toxteth
Party	Candidate	Votes	%	±%
Whig	Timmy Turner	291	56%	
Conservative	John Sheppard *	227	44%	
Majority		64	12%	N/A
Registered electors				
Turnout		518		
Whig gain from Conservative		Swing		

=== Pitt Street ===
No. 8 Pitt Street
Party	Candidate	Votes	%	±%
Conservative	Thomas Robinson	203	65%	
Whig	George Thirkell	108	35%	
Majority		95	30%	N/A
Registered electors				
Turnout		311		
Conservative gain from Whig		Swing		

=== Rodney Street ===
No. 10 Rodney Street
Party	Candidate	Votes	%	±%
Conservative	John Nelson Wood *	275	50%	
Whig	Robert Ellison Harvey	275	50%	
Majority		0	0%	
Registered electors				
Turnout		550		
Conservative hold		Swing		

Because there was a tie, the casting vote of the presiding alderman (Richard Smethurst Crook, Conservative) went to John Nelson Wood (Conservative).

=== St. Anne Street ===
No. 13 St. Anne Street
Party	Candidate	Votes	%	±%
Whig	William Earle	Unopposed	N/A	N/A
Registered electors				
Whig gain from Conservative				

=== St. Paul's ===
No. 4 St. Paul's
Party	Candidate	Votes	%	±%
Whig	Eyre Evans	171	56%	
Conservative	John Caton Thompson *	133	44%	
Majority		38	12%	N/A
Registered electors				
Turnout		304		
Whig gain from Conservative		Swing		

=== St. Peter's ===
No. 7 St. Peter's
Party	Candidate	Votes	%	±%
Conservative	John Stewart	Unopposed	N/A	N/A
Registered electors				
Conservative hold				

=== Scotland ===
No. 2 Scotland
Party	Candidate	Votes	%	±%
Conservative	Richard Houghton jun *	Unopposed	N/A	N/A
Registered electors				
Conservative hold				

=== South Toxteth ===
No. 15 South Toxteth
Party	Candidate	Votes	%	±%
Conservative	Ambrose Lace *	Unopposed	N/A	N/A
Registered electors				
Conservative hold				

=== Vauxhall ===
No. 3 Vauxhall
Party	Candidate	Votes	%	±%
Whig	William Rathbone	Unopposed	N/A	N/A
Registered electors				
Whig hold				

=== West Derby ===
No. 14 West Derby
Party	Candidate	Votes	%	±%
Conservative	James Plumpton *	183	55%	
Whig	James Mellor	148	45%	
Majority		35	10%	
Registered electors				
Turnout		331		
Conservative hold		Swing		

== See also ==
- Liverpool Town Council elections 1835 - 1879
- Liverpool City Council elections 1880–present
- Mayors and Lord Mayors of Liverpool 1207 to present
- History of local government in England
