= Pitt Street (Liverpool ward) =

Coordinates: 53.3995°N 2.9790°W

Pitt Street (ward)
- Electoral ward
- Location within Merseyside
- OS grid reference: SJ347889
  - London: 178 mi (286 km) SSE
- Metropolitan borough: City of Liverpool
- Metropolitan county: Merseyside
- Region: North West
- Country: England
- Sovereign state: United Kingdom
- Post town: LIVERPOOL
- Postcode district: L
- Dialling code: 0151
- Police: Merseyside
- Fire: Merseyside
- Ambulance: North West

Pitt Street was one of the original electoral wards in Liverpool, established under the Municipal Corporations Act 1835. It elected three councillors and was part of the city’s internal divisions until the reorganisation of wards in 1895.

== Overview ==
Pitt Street ward was established on 1 November 1835, when Liverpool was first divided into 16 wards. It participated in Liverpool City Council elections during the 19th century. On 31 October 1895, the original set of wards were reorganised, and many were abolished or restructured. Pitt Street was one of those that ceased to exist in its original form at that time.

Pitt Street ward covered the area around Pitt Street in Central Liverpool, which includes what was once a dense urban area close to the docks. The area had a mixed population, including immigrant communities, boarding houses, and shops. Over time, the street and surrounding neighbourhood became known for poorer housing and overcrowding. The living conditions were reported in various 19th- and early-20th-century sources to be quite difficult.

Pitt Street is historically linked with Liverpool’s Chinese community. Many Chinese-run boarding houses, laundries, restaurants, etc., were located around Pitt Street. It was one of the focal areas for Chinatown early on. There was a Pitt Street Wesleyan Chapel, one of the older Methodist chapels in Liverpool, which was rebuilt and served the area; it was part of the South Circuit of chapels.

== Elections ==
=== 1835 ===
No. 8 Pitt Street - 3 seats
Party	Candidate	Votes	%	±%
Whig	Hugh Hornby	201	56%	N/A
Whig	William Rathbone	193	54%	N/A
Whig	William Robert Preston	184	51%	N/A
Conservative	John Bibby	158	44%	N/A
Conservative	Peter Bourne	151	42%	N/A
Conservative	T. C. Molyneux	140	39%	N/A
Majority		43		N/A
Registered electors		532		
Turnout		359	67%	N/A
Whig win (new seat)				
Whig win (new seat)				
Whig win (new seat)				

Polling place : At two compartments in the South Free School in Park-lane.

=== 1836 ===
No. 8 Pitt Street
Party	Candidate	Votes	%	±%
Conservative	John Bibby	199	55%	
Whig	William Robert Preston *	151	43%	
Majority		48	12%	N/A
Registered electors		551		
Turnout		350	64%	
Conservative gain from Whig		Swing		

=== 1837 ===
No. 8 Pitt Street
Party	Candidate	Votes	%	±%
Whig	William Rathbone *	229	52%	
Conservative	James Aspinall	208	48%	
Majority		21	4%	
Registered electors				
Turnout		437		
Whig hold		Swing		

=== 1838 ===
No. 8 Pitt Street
Party	Candidate	Votes	%	±%
Whig	Hugh Hornby *	210	56%	
Conservative	Thomas Toulmin	166	44%	
Majority		44	12%	
Registered electors		563		
Turnout		376	67%	
Whig hold		Swing		

Time	Hugh Hornby		Thomas Toulmin	
Time	Votes	%	Votes	%
10:00	57	49%	60	51%
11:00	113	53%	100	47%
12:00			113	
13:00	167	56%	131	44%
14:00	172	55%	140	45%
15:00	194	55%	156	45%
16:00	210	56%	166	44%

=== 1839 ===
No. 8 Pitt Street
Party	Candidate	Votes	%	±%
Whig	Richard Vaughan Yates	192	50.4%	
Conservative	John Bibby *	189	49.6%	
Majority		3	0.8%	N/A
Registered electors		560		
Turnout		381	68%	
Whig gain from Conservative		Swing		

=== 1840 ===
No. 8 Pitt Street
Party	Candidate	Votes	%	±%
Conservative	Thomas Toulmin	189	50.1%	
Whig	William Rathbone *	188	49.9%	
Majority		1	0.2%	N/A
Registered electors				
Turnout		377		
Conservative gain from Whig		Swing		

Time	Thomas Toulmin		William Rathbone	
Time	Votes	%	Votes	%
10:00	75	57%	56	43%
11:00	105	56%	84	44%
12:00	135	54%	115	46%
13:00	149	53%	134	47%
14:00	164	53%	146	47%
15:00	170	51%	164	49%
16:00	189	50.1%	188	49.9%

=== 1841 ===
No. 8 Pitt Street
Party	Candidate	Votes	%	±%
Conservative	James Aspinall	317	54%	
Whig	Hugh Hornby *	275	46%	
Majority		42	8%	N/A
Registered electors		768		
Turnout		592	77%	
Conservative gain from Whig		Swing		

=== 1842 ===
No. 8 Pitt Street
Party	Candidate	Votes	%	±%
Whig	William Fawcett	190	53%	
Conservative	John Taylor	171	47%	
Majority		19	6%	
Registered electors		484		
Turnout		361	75%	
Whig hold		Swing		

Time	William Fawcett		John Taylor	
Time	Votes	%	Votes	%
10:00	51	57%	39	43%
11:00	76	56%	60	44%
12:00	87	57%	66	43%
13:00	107	56%	83	44%
14:00	138	54%	116	46%
15:00	160	52%	145	48%
16:00	190	53%	171	47%

=== 1843 ===
No. 8 Pitt Street
Party	Candidate	Votes	%	±%
Conservative	Thomas Toulmin *	211	55%	
Whig	Robert Benn	173	45%	
Majority		38	10%	
Registered electors		516		
Turnout		384	74%	
Conservative hold		Swing		

Polling Place : The Committee-room of the South Corporation School, in Park-lane.

=== 1844 ===
No. 8 Pitt Street
Party	Candidate	Votes	%	±%
Conservative	James Aspinall *	Unopposed	N/A	N/A
Registered electors		536		
Conservative hold				

=== 1845 ===
No. 8 Pitt Street
Party	Candidate	Votes	%	±%
Conservative	Thomas Robinson	203	65%	
Whig	George Thirkell	108	35%	
Majority		95	30%	N/A
Registered electors				
Turnout		311		
Conservative gain from Whig		Swing		

=== 1846 ===
No. 8 Pitt Street
Party	Candidate	Votes	%	±%
Conservative	Thomas Toulmin *	199	55%	
Whig	George Holt	163	45%	
Majority		36	10%	
Registered electors		523		
Turnout		362	69%	
Conservative hold		Swing		

=== 1847 ===
No. 8 Pitt Street
Party	Candidate	Votes	%	±%
Conservative	Thomas Rimmer	169	56%	
Whig	James Denton	131	44%	
Majority		38	12%	
Registered electors		476		
Turnout		300	63%	
Conservative hold		Swing		

=== 1848 ===
No. 8 Pitt Street
Party	Candidate	Votes	%	±%
Conservative	Thomas Robinson *	Unopposed		
Registered electors				
Conservative hold				

Polling Place : The Committee-room of the South Corporation School, in Park-lane.

Thomas Robinson was a pro-rater.

=== 1849 ===
No. 8 Pitt Street
Party	Candidate	Votes	%	±%
Conservative	Thomas Toulmin *	Unopposed	N/A	N/A
Registered electors		482		
Conservative hold				

Thomas Toulmin was opposed to the Rivington Pike water scheme.

=== 1850 ===
No. 8 Pitt Street
Party	Candidate	Votes	%	±%
Conservative	Walter Powell Jeffreys *	Unopposed	N/A	N/A
Registered electors				
Conservative hold				

=== 1851 ===
No. 8 Pitt Street
Party	Candidate	Votes	%	±%
Conservative	John Gladstone jun.	Unopposed	N/A	N/A
Registered electors				
gain from		Swing		

=== 1852 ===
No. 8 Pitt Street
Party	Candidate	Votes	%	±%
Conservative	Thomas Toulmin *	Unopposed	N/A	N/A
Registered electors				
Conservative hold				

=== 1853 ===
No. 8 Pitt Street
Party	Candidate	Votes	%	±%
Conservative	Walter Powell Jeffreys *	225	63%	
Whig	John Smith	133	37%	
Majority		92	26%	N/A
Registered electors				
Turnout		358		
Conservative hold		Swing		

=== 1854 ===
No. 8 Pitt Street
Party	Candidate	Votes	%	±%
Conservative	John Gladstone jun. *	Unopposed	N/A	N/A
Registered electors				
Conservative hold				

=== 1855 ===
No. 8 Pitt Street
Party	Candidate	Votes	%	±%
Conservative	William Mann	unopposed		
Registered electors				
Conservative hold		Swing		

=== 1856 ===
No. 8 Pitt Street
Party	Candidate	Votes	%	±%
Conservative	Walter Powell Jeffreys *	unopposed		
Registered electors				
Conservative hold		Swing		

=== 1857 ===
No. 8 Pitt Street
Party	Candidate	Votes	%	±%
	Samuel Robert Graves	unopposed		
Registered electors				
		Swing		

=== 1858 ===
No. 8 Pitt Street
Party	Candidate	Votes	%	±%
Conservative	Thomas Ridley	unopposed		
Registered electors				
Conservative hold		Swing		

Polling Place : The Committee room of the South Corporation School, in Park Lane.

=== 1859 ===
No. 8 Pitt Street
Party	Candidate	Votes	%	±%
Conservative	Walter Powell Jeffreys *	209	55%	
Liberal	James Steel	174	45%	
Majority		35	10%	
Registered electors		509		
Turnout		383	75%	
Conservative hold		Swing		

Time	Walter Powell Jeffreys		James Steel	
Time	Votes	%	Votes	%
10:00	53	54%	45	46%
11:00	114	55%	95	45%
12:00	141	54%	121	46%
13:00	173	56%	136	44%
14:00	181	55%	149	45%
15:00	203	54%	170	46%
16:00	209	55%	174	45%

=== 1860 ===
No. 8 Pitt Street
Party	Candidate	Votes	%	±%
Conservative	Samuel Robert Graves *	unopposed		
Registered electors				
Conservative hold		Swing		

=== 1861 ===
No. 8 Pitt Street
Party	Candidate	Votes	%	±%
	Thomas Ridley *	unopposed		
Registered electors				
		Swing		

=== 1862 ===
No. 8 Pitt Street
Party	Candidate	Votes	%	±%
Conservative	Walter Powell Jeffreys *	unopposed		
Registered electors				
Conservative hold		Swing		

=== 1863 ===
No. 8 Pitt Street
Party	Candidate	Votes	%	±%
Conservative	Samuel Robert Graves *	20	100%	
Liberal	James Levington	0	0%	
Majority		20	100%	
Registered electors				
Turnout		20		
Conservative hold		Swing		

=== 1864 ===
No. 8 Pitt Street
Party	Candidate	Votes	%	±%
Conservative	John Rimmer	216	52%	
Liberal	William McMillen	197	48%	
Majority		19	4%	
Registered electors				
Turnout		413		
Conservative gain from Liberal		Swing		

Time	John Rimmer		William McMillen	
Time	Votes	%	Votes	%
11:00	107	49%	111	51%
11:30	135	52%	123	48%
12:00	154	52%	141	48%
12:30	166	53%	147	47%
13:00	183	53%	165	47%
13:30	183	53%	165	47%
14:00	192	53%	171	47%
15:00	210	52%	192	48%
15:30	214	52%	195	48%
16:00	216	52%	197	48%

=== 1865 ===
No. 8 Pitt Street
Party	Candidate	Votes	%	±%
Conservative	R. C. Janion	unopposed		
Registered electors				
Conservative hold		Swing		

=== 1866 ===
No. 8 Pitt Street
Party	Candidate	Votes	%	±%
Conservative	Henry Jennings	202	52%	
Liberal	James Steel	187	48%	
Majority		15	4%	
Registered electors				
Turnout		389		
Conservative hold		Swing		

=== 1867 ===
No. 8 Pitt Street
Party	Candidate	Votes	%	±%
Conservative	John Rimmer *	unopposed		
Registered electors				
Conservative hold		Swing		

=== 1868 ===
No. 8 Pitt Street
Party	Candidate	Votes	%	±%
Conservative	William Bower Forwood	189	59%	
Liberal	James Steele	134	41%	
Majority		56	18%	N/A
Registered electors				
Turnout		323		
Conservative gain from Liberal		Swing		

=== 1869 ===
No. 8 Pitt Street
Party	Candidate	Votes	%	±%
Conservative	Henry Jennings *	unopposed		
Registered electors				
Conservative hold		Swing		

=== 1870 ===
No. 8 Pitt Street
Party	Candidate	Votes	%	±%
Conservative	Charles Edward Hamilton	363	55%	
Liberal	Daniel Lowrey	298	45%	
Majority		65	10%	
Registered electors				
Turnout		661		
Conservative hold		Swing		

=== 1871 ===
No. 8 Pitt Street
Party	Candidate	Votes	%	±%
Conservative	William Bower Forwood *	unopposed		
Registered electors				
Conservative hold		Swing		

=== 1872 ===
No. 8 Pitt Street
Party	Candidate	Votes	%	±%
Conservative	Henry Jennings *	unopposed		
Registered electors				
Conservative hold		Swing		

=== 1873 ===
No. 8 Pitt Street
Party	Candidate	Votes	%	±%
Conservative	Charles Edward Hamilton *	305	50%	
Liberal	James Steel	303	50%	
Majority		2		
Registered electors		774		
Turnout		608	79%	
Conservative hold		Swing		

=== 1874 ===
No. 8 Pitt Street
Party	Candidate	Votes	%	±%
Conservative	William Bower Forwood *	unopposed		
Registered electors				
Conservative hold		Swing		

=== 1875 ===
No. 8 Pitt Street
Party	Candidate	Votes	%	±%
Conservative	Henry Jennings *	383	51%	
Liberal	Edward Browne	373	49%	
Majority		10	2%	
Registered electors		1,027		
Turnout		756	74%	
Conservative hold		Swing		

=== 1876 ===
No. 8 Pitt Street
Party	Candidate	Votes	%	±%
Conservative	Col. Charles Edward Hamilton *	332	54%	
Liberal	Garrett Michael Byrne	287	46%	
Majority		45	8%	
Registered electors		764		
Turnout		619	81%	
Conservative hold		Swing		

=== 1877 ===
No. 8 Pitt Street
Party	Candidate	Votes	%	±%
Liberal	Henry Charles Hawley	424	52%	
Conservative	William Bower Forwood *	385	48%	
Majority		39	4%	N/A
Registered electors		943		
Turnout		809	86%	
Liberal gain from Conservative		Swing		

=== 1878 ===
No. 8 Pitt Street
Party	Candidate	Votes	%	±%
Liberal	James Steel	378	55%	
Conservative	Horatio Syred	304	45%	
Majority		74	10%	N/A
Registered electors		847		
Turnout		682	81%	
Liberal gain from Conservative		Swing		

=== 1879 ===
No. 8 Pitt Street
Party	Candidate	Votes	%	±%
Liberal	Jeremiah Miles	371	59%	
Conservative	Robert Andrew Thomas	249	39%	
Conservative	William de Silva	11	2%	
Majority		122	20%	N/A
Registered electors		880		
Turnout		631	72%	
Liberal gain from Conservative		Swing		

=== 1880 ===
No. 8 Pitt Street
Party	Candidate	Votes	%	±%
Liberal	Henry Charles Hawley *	393	57%	
Conservative	Henry Jennings	294	43%	
Majority		99	14%	
Registered electors		848		
Turnout		687	81%	
Liberal hold		Swing		

=== 1881 ===
No. 8 Pitt Street
Party	Candidate	Votes	%	±%
Liberal	Francis Joseph McAdam	326	58%	
Conservative	Horatio Syred	235	42%	
Majority		91	16%	
Registered electors		811		
Turnout		561	69%	
Liberal hold		Swing		

=== 1882 ===
No. 8 Pitt Street
Party	Candidate	Votes	%	±%
Liberal	Jeremiah Miles *	unopposed		
Registered electors				
Liberal hold		Swing		

=== 1883 ===
No. 8 Pitt Street
Party	Candidate	Votes	%	±%
Liberal	Henry Charles Hawley *	unopposed		
Registered electors		798		
Liberal hold		Swing		

=== 1884 ===
No. 8 Pitt Street
Party	Candidate	Votes	%	±%
Liberal	Francis Joseph McAdam *	unopposed		
Registered electors		803		
Liberal hold		Swing		

=== 1885 ===
No. 8 Pitt Street
Party	Candidate	Votes	%	±%
Liberal	Jeremiah Miles *	unopposed		
Registered electors		719		
Liberal hold		Swing		

=== 1886 ===
No. 8 Pitt Street
Party	Candidate	Votes	%	±%
Liberal	Henry Charles Hawley *	327	57%	
Conservative	Ephraim Walker	246	43%	
Majority		81	14%	
Registered electors		785		
Turnout		573	73%	
Liberal hold		Swing		

=== 1887 ===
No. 8 Pitt Street
Party	Candidate	Votes	%	±%
Conservative	Francis Joseph McAdam *	Unopposed	N/A	N/A
Registered electors				
Conservative hold				

=== 1888 ===
No. 8 Pitt Street
Party	Candidate	Votes	%	±%
Liberal	Jeremiah Miles *	unopposed		
Registered electors				
Liberal hold		Swing		

=== 1889 ===
No. 8 Pitt Street
Party	Candidate	Votes	%	±%
Liberal	Henry Charles Hawley *	unopposed		
Registered electors				
Liberal hold		Swing		

=== 1890 ===
No. 8 Pitt Street
Party	Candidate	Votes	%	±%
Liberal	Francis Joseph McAdam *	308	66%	
Conservative	William King	161	34%	
Majority		147	32%	
Registered electors		710		
Turnout		469	66%	
Liberal hold		Swing		

=== 1891 ===
No. 8 Pitt Street
Party	Candidate	Votes	%	±%
Liberal	John Scott	325	59%	
Conservative	William King	229	41%	
Majority		96	18%	
Registered electors				
Turnout		554		
Liberal hold		Swing		

=== 1892 ===
No. 8 Pitt Street
Party	Candidate	Votes	%	±%
Liberal	Henry Charles Hawley *	unopposed		
Registered electors				
Liberal hold		Swing		

=== 1893 ===
No. 8 Pitt Street
Party	Candidate	Votes	%	±%
Liberal	Dr. Joseph George McCann	306	62%	
Conservative	Isaac Ashton	187	38%	
Majority		119	24%	
Registered electors		728		
Turnout		493	68%	
Liberal hold		Swing		

=== 1894 ===
No. 8 Pitt Street
Party	Candidate	Votes	%	±%
Liberal	John Scott *	unopposed		
Registered electors				
Liberal hold		Swing		
