= 1898 Liverpool City Council election =

English local election

- November 1, 1898

28 seats were up for election: one seat for each of the 28 wards 57 (incl. Aldermen) seats needed for a majority

Elections to Liverpool City Council were held on Thursday 1 November 1898. One third of the council seats were up for election, the term of office of each councillor being three years.

Sixteen of the twenty-eight wards were uncontested.

After the election, the composition of the council was:

Party	Councillors	±	Aldermen	Total
Conservative	56	-1	18	74
Liberal	18	+1	8	26
Irish Nationalists	8	0	2	10
Liberal Unionist	1	0	1	2

== Election result ==
Liverpool local election result 1898
Party	Seats	Gains	Losses	Net gain/loss	Seats %	Votes %	Votes	+/−
Conservative	17	1	2	-1	61%	52%	11,656	
Liberal	7	2	1	+1	25%	31%	6,842	
Irish Nationalist	3	0	0	0	11%			
Liberal Unionist	1	0	0	0		4%	1,123	
Independent Liberal	0	0				5.3%	1,185	
Independent	0					3.1%	683	
Labour	0	0	0	0	0%	2.8%	626	
Independent Irish Nationalist	0				0%	0.31%	70	

Because of the large number of uncontested wards, these statistics should be taken in that context.

== Ward results ==
* - Retiring Councillor seeking re-election

Comparisons are made with the 1895 election results, as the retiring councillors were elected in that year.

=== Abercromby ===
No. 21 Abercromby
Party	Candidate	Votes	%	±%
Conservative	Maxwell Hyslop Maxwell *	570	93%	
Independent	John O'Brien	46	7%	
Majority		524		
Registered electors		3,002		
Turnout		616	21%	
Rejected ballots		2		
Conservative hold		Swing		

=== Breckfield ===
No. 6 Breckfield
Party	Candidate	Votes	%	±%
Conservative	Edwin Berry	1,310	55%	
Liberal	Jonathan Hargrove	1,075	45%	
Majority		235		
Registered electors		4,046		
Turnout		2,385	59%	
Conservative hold		Swing		

=== Brunswick ===
No. 25 Brunswick
Party	Candidate	Votes	%	±%
Liberal	Charles Henry Beloe *	1,079	56%	
Conservative	John Thomas	838	44%	
Majority		241		
Registered electors		3,053		
Turnout		1,917	63%	
Liberal hold		Swing		

=== Castle Street ===
No. 18 Castle Street
Party	Candidate	Votes	%	±%
Conservative	Thomas Binley Neale	unopposed		
Registered electors				
Conservative gain from Liberal Unionist		Swing		

=== Dingle ===
No. 26 Dingle
Party	Candidate	Votes	%	±%
Conservative	Edward James Chevalier	1,608	58%	
Independent Liberal	Thomas Byrne	1,185	42%	
Majority		423		
Registered electors		5,367		
Turnout		2,793	52%	
Conservative hold		Swing		

=== Edge Hill ===
No. 12 Edge Hill
Party	Candidate	Votes	%	±%
Conservative	William Wilson Walker	1,441	63%	
Liberal	John William Fairbrother	861	37%	
Majority		580		
Registered electors		4,938		
Turnout		2,302	47%	
Conservative hold		Swing		

=== Everton ===
No. 9 Everton
Party	Candidate	Votes	%	±%
Liberal Unionist	William Oulton *	1,123	84%	
Labour	Robert Clement Faulkener	208	16%	
Majority		915		
Registered electors		4,745		
Turnout		1,331	28%	
Liberal Unionist hold		Swing		

=== Exchange ===
No. 16 Exchange
Party	Candidate	Votes	%	±%
Liberal	Robert Durning Holt *	unopposed		
Registered electors				
Liberal hold		Swing		

=== Fairfield ===
No. 4 Fairfield
Party	Candidate	Votes	%	±%
Conservative	Joseph Hunter	unopposed		
Registered electors				
Conservative hold		Swing		

=== Granby ===
No. 22 Granby
Party	Candidate	Votes	%	±%
Liberal	Robert Henry Bullen	1,439	59%	
Conservative	Herbert Campbell *	992	41%	
Majority		447		
Registered electors		3,992		
Turnout		2,431	61%	
Liberal gain from Conservative		Swing		

=== Great George ===
No. 20 Great George
Party	Candidate	Votes	%	±%
Liberal	Edward Paull	unopposed		
Registered electors				
Liberal hold		Swing		

=== Kensington ===
No. 11 Kensington
Party	Candidate	Votes	%	±%
Conservative	Dr. Thomas Clarke *	unopposed		
Registered electors				
Conservative hold		Swing		

=== Kirkdale ===
No. 2 Kirkdale
Party	Candidate	Votes	%	±%
Conservative	Joseph Hoult *	1,832	65%	
Liberal	John Lyon Langford	987	35%	
Majority		845		
Registered electors		6,228		
Turnout		2,819		
Conservative hold		Swing		

=== Low Hill ===
No. 10 Low Hill
Party	Candidate	Votes	%	±%
Conservative	George Jones *	1,029	71%	
Labour	Clement William George	418	29%	
Majority		611		
Registered electors		4,213		
Turnout		1,447	34%	
Rejected ballots		14		
Conservative hold		Swing		

=== Netherfield ===
No. 8 Netherfield
Party	Candidate	Votes	%	±%
Conservative	John Robert Fletcher *	unopposed		
Registered electors				
Conservative hold		Swing		

=== North Scotland ===
No. 13 North Scotland
Party	Candidate	Votes	%	±%
Irish Nationalist	James Bolger *	unopposed		
Registered electors				
Irish Nationalist hold		Swing		

=== North Walton ===
No. 27 North Walton
Party	Candidate	Votes	%	±%
Conservative	Richard Kelly *	unopposed		
Registered electors				
Conservative hold		Swing		

=== Prince's Park ===
No. 23 Prince's Park
Party	Candidate	Votes	%	±%
Conservative	William Edward Willink *	unopposed		
Registered electors				
Conservative hold		Swing		

=== Sandhills ===
No. 1 Sandhills
Party	Candidate	Votes	%	±%
Liberal	Thomas Salter	1,023	53%	
Conservative	Barnett Lipson	870	45%	
Independent Irish Nationalist	Michael Thomas Bolger	20	1%	
Majority		153		
Registered electors		3,308		
Turnout		1,913	58%	
Liberal hold		Swing		

=== St. Anne's ===
No. 17 St. Anne's
Party	Candidate	Votes	%	±%
Liberal	James Crean *	378	88%	
Independent Irish Nationalist	Thomas Hart	50	12%	
Majority		328		
Registered electors		3,461		
Turnout		428	12%	
Liberal hold		Swing		

=== St. Domingo ===
No. 7 St. Domingo
Party	Candidate	Votes	%	±%
Conservative	Anthony Shelmerdine	unopposed		
Registered electors				
Conservative hold		Swing		

=== St. Peter's ===
No. 19 St. Peter's
Party	Candidate	Votes	%	±%
Liberal	Henry Miles	unopposed		
Registered electors				
Liberal gain from Conservative		Swing		

=== Sefton Park ===
No. 24 Sefton Park
Party	Candidate	Votes	%	±%
Conservative	Francis Henderson *	unopposed		
Registered electors				
Conservative hold		Swing		

=== South Scotland ===
No. 14 South Scotland
Party	Candidate	Votes	%	±%
Irish Nationalist	George Jeremy Lynskey	unopposed		
Registered electors				
Irish Nationalist hold		Swing		

=== South Walton ===
No. 3 South Walton
Party	Candidate	Votes	%	±%
Conservative	William Houlding *	1,166	63%	
Independent	Alexander McLaren	683	37%	
Majority		483		
Registered electors		3,846		
Turnout		1,849	48%	
Conservative hold		Swing		

=== Vauxhall ===
No. 15 Vauxhall
Party	Candidate	Votes	%	±%
Irish Nationalist	John Gregory Taggart *	unopposed		
Registered electors				
Irish Nationalist hold		Swing		

=== Wavertree ===
No. 5 Wavertree
Party	Candidate	Votes	%	±%
Conservative	Isaac Turner *	unopposed		
Registered electors				
Conservative hold		Swing		

=== West Derby ===
No. 28 West Derby
Party	Candidate	Votes	%	±%
Conservative	James Lister *	unopposed		
Registered electors				
Conservative hold		Swing		

== Aldermanic Elections ==
At the meeting of the Council on 9 November 1898, the terms of office of fourteen alderman expired. The following fourteen were elected as Aldermen by the Council (Aldermen and Councillors) on 9 November 1898 for a term of six years.

* - re-elected aldermen.

Party	Alderman
Conservative	William Bartlett *
Liberal	William Benjamin Bowring JP *
Irish Nationalist	Dr. Andrew Commins MP *
Conservative	Charles Herbert Giles *
Liberal Unionist	Henry Hugh Hornby JP *
Conservative	Thomas Menlove JP *
Liberal	Jeremiah Miles JP *
Liberal	Edward Paull JP
Irish Nationalist	Edward Purcell
Liberal	James Ruddin JP *
Conservative	Archibald Tutton Salvidge the younger JP
Liberal	Frederick Smith *
Conservative	Ephraim Walker JP *
Conservative	William Humphry Williams *

== By-elections ==
=== Aldermanic By Election, 9 November 1898 ===
Following the death of Alderman Arthur Bower Forwood Bart. MP, former councillor Herbert Campbell JP (Conservative, North Toxteth elected 1886, 1889 and 1892) was elected as an alderman by the council on 9 November 1898 .

=== No. 20, Great George, 25 November 1898 ===
Caused by the election of Councillor Edward Paul (Liberal, Great George, elected 1 November 1898) as an alderman by the Council on 9 November 1898.

No. 20 Great George
Party	Candidate	Votes	%	±%
	John Henderson	925	63%	
	George Henry Ball	537	37%	
Majority		388		
Registered electors				
Turnout		1,462		
		Swing		

=== No. 13, North Scotland, 29 November 1898 ===
Caused by the election of Councillor Edward Purcell (Irish Nationalist, North Scotland, elected 1 November 1896) as an alderman by the council (councillors and aldermen) on 9 November 1898.

No. 20 North Scotland
Party	Candidate	Votes	%	±%
Irish Nationalist	Alexander Murray Bligh	unopposed		
Registered electors				
Irish Nationalist hold		Swing		

=== No. 14, South Scotland, 29 November 1898 ===
Caused by the death of Councillor Owen O'Hara (Irish Nationalist, South Scotland, elected 1 November 1896) on 11 November 1898.

No. 14 South Scotland
Party	Candidate	Votes	%	±%
Irish Nationalist	Austin Harford	756	49%	
	Terence Edward Brady	472	24%	
	George Turner	470	24%	
	Patrick Redmond	231	12%	
Majority		284		
Registered electors				
Turnout		1,929		
Irish Nationalist hold		Swing		

=== No. 20, Great George, 10 February 1899 ===
Caused by the death of Councillor Thomas Donnelly (Liberal, Great George, elected 1 November 1897) on 18 January 1899.

No. 20 Great George
Party	Candidate	Votes	%	±%
Liberal	Thomas Dowdall	unopposed		
Registered electors				
Liberal hold		Swing		

=== No.1, Sandhills, 17 March 1899 ===
Caused by the resignation of Councillor William Nelson (Liberal, Sandhills, elected 1 November 1897) which was reported to the Council on 1 March 1899.

No. 1 Sandhills
Party	Candidate	Votes	%	±%
Irish Nationalist	Bernard Conlon	unopposed		
Registered electors				
Irish Nationalist hold		Swing		

=== No. 14, South Scotland, 28 April 1899 ===
The election of George Jeremy Lynskey (Irish Nationalist, South Scotland, elected unopposed 1 November 1898) was declared void by the Queen's Bench Division of the High Court of Justice 15 April 1899 .

No. 14 South Scotland
Party	Candidate	Votes	%	±%
	Francis Joseph Harford	993	53%	
	George Jeremy Lynskey	893	47%	
Majority		100		
Registered electors				
Turnout		1,886		
		Swing		

=== No. 15, Vauxhall, 19 May 1899 ===
Caused by the death of Councillor Thomas Flynn (Irish Nationalist, Vauxhall, elected 1 November 1897) on 3 May 1899.

No. 15 Vauxhall
Party	Candidate	Votes	%	±%
Irish Nationalist	Thomas Burke	680	69%	
	Patrick Jeremiah Kelly	304	31%	
Majority		376		
Registered electors				
Turnout		984		
Irish Nationalist hold		Swing		

=== No. 14, South Scotland, ===
Caused by the death of Councillor Robert Thompson (Irish Nationalist, South Scotland, elected 1 November 1896) on 21 July 1899.

No. 14 South Scotland
Party	Candidate	Votes	%	±%
Registered electors				
		Swing		

=== No. 26, Dingle, 10 October 1899 ===
Caused by the resignation of Alderman Joseph Bond Morgan (Conservative, elected by the council as an alderman on 9 November 1895)

Councillor Thomas Evans (Conservative, Dingle, elected 1 November 1897) was elected by the Council (Councillors and Aldermen) as an Alderman on 6 September 1899 .

No. 26 Dingle
Party	Candidate	Votes	%	±%
Conservative	Alfred Stephen Collard	unopposed		
Registered electors				
Conservative hold		Swing		

=== No. 19, St. Peter's, October 1899 ===
The resignation of Alderman Jeremiah Miles (Liberal, elected 9 November 1898) was reported to the Council on 4 October 1899. Councillor William Henry Watts (Liberal St. Peter's, elected 1 November 1897) was elected as an alderman by the council on 4 October 1899.

No. 19 St. Peter's
Party	Candidate	Votes	%	±%
Liberal	Henry Miles *			
Majority				
Registered electors				
Turnout				
Liberal hold		Swing		

== See also ==
- Liverpool City Council
- Liverpool Town Council elections 1835 - 1879
- Liverpool City Council elections 1880–present
- Mayors and Lord Mayors of Liverpool 1207 to present
- History of local government in England
