= 1839 Liverpool Town Council election =

1839 English local government election

← 1838	1 November 1839	1840 →
	Reformers	Conservative
Party	Reformers	Conservative
Council Leader before election
Conservative
Council Leader after election
Reformers

Elections to the Liverpool Town Council were held on Wednesday, 1 November 1839. One-third of the council seats were up for election, with each councillor serving a three-year term.

One of the sixteen wards was uncontested.

After the election, the composition of the council was as follows:

Party	Councillors	±	Aldermen	Total
Reformers	28	-2	16	44
Conservative	20	+2	0	20

== Election result ==
Liverpool local election result 1839
Party	Seats	Gains	Losses	Net gain/loss	Seats %	Votes %	Votes	+/−
Whig	7	2	4	-2	44%	48%	3,146	
Conservative	9	4	2	+2	56%	52%	3,342	

== Ward results ==
* - Retiring Councillor seeking re-election

=== Abercromby ===
No. 11 Abercromby
Party	Candidate	Votes	%	±%
Conservative	Christopher Bushell	318	51%	
Whig	Henry Ripley	310	49%	
Majority		8	2%	N/A
Registered electors		755		
Turnout		628	83%	
Conservative gain from Whig		Swing		

=== Castle Street ===
No. 6 Castle Street
Party	Candidate	Votes	%	±%
Whig	Thomas Bolton *	245	52%	
Conservative	P. Hope	222	48%	
Majority		23	4%	
Registered electors		685		
Turnout		467	68%	
Whig hold		Swing		

=== Everton ===
No. 1 Everton
Party	Candidate	Votes	%	±%
Whig	George Quayle	304	50.1%	
Conservative	William Shand	303	49.9%	
Majority		1	0.2%	N/A
Registered electors		761		
Turnout		607	80%	
Whig gain from Conservative		Swing		

=== Exchange ===
No. 5 Exchange
Party	Candidate	Votes	%	±%
Whig	James Mellor*	193	50.1%	
Conservative	Ambrose Lace	192	49.9%	
Majority		1	0.2%	
Registered electors		552		
Turnout		385	70%	
Whig hold		Swing		

=== Great George ===
No. 9 Great George
Party	Candidate	Votes	%	±%
Conservative	Thomas Robinson	188	53%	
Whig	Lawrence Heyworth	167	47%	
Majority		21	6%	
Registered electors		505		
Turnout		355	70%	
Conservative hold		Swing		

=== Lime Street ===
No. 12 Lime Street
Party	Candidate	Votes	%	±%
Conservative	Robert Rigby	405	52%	
Whig	Vincent Higgins *	371	48%	
Majority		34	4%	N/A
Registered electors		990		
Turnout		776	78%	
Conservative gain from Whig		Swing		

=== North Toxteth ===
No. 16 North Toxteth
Party	Candidate	Votes	%	±%
Whig	Daniel Mather	257	52%	
Conservative	Richard Harbord	233	48%	
Majority		24	4%	
Registered electors		710		
Turnout		490	69%	
Whig hold		Swing		

=== Pitt Street ===
No. 8 Pitt Street
Party	Candidate	Votes	%	±%
Whig	Richard Vaughan Yates	192	50.4%	
Conservative	John Bibby *	189	49.6%	
Majority		3	0.8%	N/A
Registered electors		560		
Turnout		381	68%	
Whig gain from Conservative		Swing		

=== Rodney Street ===
No. 10 Rodney Street
Party	Candidate	Votes	%	±%
Conservative	John Nelson Wood *	274	55%	
Whig	George Loch	225	45%	
Majority		49	10%	N/A
Registered electors		715		
Turnout		499	70%	
Conservative gain from Whig		Swing		

=== St. Anne Street ===
No. 13 St. Anne Street
Party	Candidate	Votes	%	±%
Conservative	Robert Jones jun.	192	53%	
Whig	Joseph Mason *	173	47%	
Majority		19	6%	N/A
Registered electors		489		
Turnout		365	75%	
Conservative gain from Whig		Swing		

=== St. Paul's ===
No. 4 St. Paul's
Party	Candidate	Votes	%	±%
Conservative	John Barton *	178	50.1%	
Whig	John Deakin	177	49.9%	
Majority		1	0.2%	
Registered electors		433		
Turnout		355	82%	
Conservative hold		Swing		

=== St. Peter's ===
No. 7 St. Peter's
Party	Candidate	Votes	%	±%
Whig	Richard Bright *	Unopposed		
Registered electors		583		
Whig hold				

=== Scotland ===
No. 2 Scotland
Party	Candidate	Votes	%	±%
Conservative	Richard Houghton *	232	55%	
Whig	H. T. Atkinson	191	45%	
Majority		41	10%	
Registered electors		594		
Turnout		423	71%	
Conservative hold		Swing		

=== South Toxteth ===
No. 15 South Toxteth
Party	Candidate	Votes	%	±%
Whig	Francis Jordan	148	51%	
Conservative	William McKee	142	49%	
Majority		6	2%	
Registered electors		363		
Turnout		290	80%	
Whig hold		Swing		

=== Vauxhall ===
No. 3 Vauxhall
Party	Candidate	Votes	%	±%
Conservative	Henry Robertson Sandbach	110	55%	
Whig	Thomas Chalmer	91	45%	
Majority		19	10%	
Registered electors		289		
Turnout		201	70%	
Conservative hold		Swing		

=== West Derby ===
No. 14 West Derby
Party	Candidate	Votes	%	±%
Conservative	John Smith *	164	62%	
Whig	Edward James	102	38%	
Majority		62	24%	
Registered electors		422		
Turnout		201	63%	
Conservative hold		Swing		

== See also ==
- Liverpool City Council
- Liverpool Town Council elections 1835–1879
- Liverpool City Council elections 1880–present
- Mayors and Lord Mayors of Liverpool 1207 to present
- History of local government in England
