= 1838 Liverpool Town Council election =

English local election

← 1837	1 November 1838	1839 →
	Reformers	Conservative
Party	Reformers	Conservative
Council Leader before election
Conservative
Council Leader after election
Reformers

Elections to Liverpool Town Council were held on Wednesday 1 November 1838. One third of the council seats were up for election, the term of office of each councillor being three years.

There was a by-election in the Castle Street ward.

Five of the seventeen seats were uncontested.

The terms "Whig" and "Reformer" are used interchangeably, although the local press at the time referred exclusively to "Reformers".

After the election, the composition of the council was:

Party	Councillors	±	Aldermen	Total
Reformers	30	-4	16	46
Conservative	18	+4	0	18

== Election result ==
Liverpool local election result 1838
Party	Seats	Gains	Losses	Net gain/loss	Seats %	Votes %	Votes	+/−
Whig	11	1	5	-4	65%	53%	2,610	
Conservative	6	5	1	+4	35%	47%	2,344	

== Ward results ==
* - Retiring Councillor seeking re-election

=== Abercromby ===
No. 11 Abercromby
Party	Candidate	Votes	%	±%
Conservative	Robertson Gladstone	296	52%	
Whig	William Earle	273	48%	
Majority		23	4%	N/A
Registered electors		663		
Turnout		569	86%	
Conservative gain from Whig		Swing		

Time	Robertson Gladstone		William Earle	
Time	Votes	%	Votes	%
10:00	79	53%	71	47%
11:00	138	55%	112	45%
12:00	170	52%	157	48%
13:00	197	53%	178	47%
14:00	235	52%	215	48%
15:00	237	49%	243	51%
16:00	296	52%	273	48%

=== Castle Street ===
No. 6 Castle Street - 2 seats
Party	Candidate	Votes	%	±%
Whig	Joshua Walmsley *	Unopposed		
Whig	Edward Pilcher	Unopposed		
Registered electors		674		
Whig hold				
Whig hold				

=== Everton ===
No. 1 Everton
Party	Candidate	Votes	%	±%
Whig	John Holmes *	279	51%	
Conservative	Francis Shand	273	49%	
Majority		6	2%	
Registered electors		706		
Turnout		552	78%	
Whig hold		Swing		

Time	John Holmes		Francis Shand	
Time	Votes	%	Votes	%
10:00	67	50%	66	50%
11:00	120	49%	126	51%
12:00	152	49%	157	51%
13:00	179	52%	168	48%
14:00	199	50%	199	50%
15:00	213	49%	233	51%
16:00	279	51%	273	49%

=== Exchange ===
No. 5 Exchange
Party	Candidate	Votes	%	±%
Whig	Henry Holmes	163	62%	
Conservative	George Gurden	101	38%	
Majority		62	24%	
Registered electors		549		
Turnout		264	48%	
Whig hold		Swing		

Time	Henry Holmes		George Gurden	
Time	Votes	%	Votes	%
10:00	35	70%	15	30%
11:00	69	69%	31	31%
12:00	91	62%	55	38%
13:00	120	63%	69	37%
14:00	138	64%	76	36%
15:00	154	62%	94	38%
16:00	163	62%	101	38%

=== Great George ===
No. 9 Great George
Party	Candidate	Votes	%	±%
Conservative	James Lawrence	Unopposed		
Registered electors		442		
Conservative gain from Whig				

=== Lime Street ===
No. 12 Lime Street
Party	Candidate	Votes	%	±%
Whig	Thomas Morecroft *	348	55%	
Conservative	Ambrose Lace	286	45%	
Majority		62	10%	
Registered electors		790		
Turnout		634	80%	
Whig hold		Swing		

Time	Thomas Morecroft		Ambrose Lace	
Time	Votes	%	Votes	%
10:00	45	45%	55	55%
11:00				
12:00	134	44%	171	56%
13:00	201	50%	198	50%
14:00	241	52%	226	48%
15:00	283			
16:00	348	55%	286	45%

=== North Toxteth ===
No. 16 North Toxteth
Party	Candidate	Votes	%	±%
Whig	William Wallace Currie *	Unopposed		
Registered electors		693		
Whig hold				

=== Pitt Street ===
No. 8 Pitt Street
Party	Candidate	Votes	%	±%
Whig	Hugh Hornby *	210	56%	
Conservative	Thomas Toulmin	166	44%	
Majority		44	12%	
Registered electors		563		
Turnout		376	67%	
Whig hold		Swing		

Time	Hugh Hornby		Thomas Toulmin	
Time	Votes	%	Votes	%
10:00	57	49%	60	51%
11:00	113	53%	100	47%
12:00			113	
13:00	167	56%	131	44%
14:00	172	55%	140	45%
15:00	194	55%	156	45%
16:00	210	56%	166	44%

=== Rodney Street ===
No. 10 Rodney Street
Party	Candidate	Votes	%	±%
Whig	Thomas Harvey	274	51%	
Conservative	Henry Lawrence *	265	49%	
Majority		9	2%	N/A
Registered electors		637		
Turnout		539		
Whig gain from Conservative		Swing		

Time	Thomas Harvey		Henry Lawrence	
Time	Votes	%	Votes	%
10:00	28	38%	45	62%
11:00	83	42%	115	58%
12:00	132	46%	152	54%
13:00	170	47%	191	53%
14:00	189	48%	204	52%
15:00	227			
16:00	274	51%	265	49%

=== St. Anne Street ===
No. 13 St. Anne Street
Party	Candidate	Votes	%	±%
Whig	Thomas Coglan *	220	56%	
Conservative	John Davies	175	44%	
Majority		45	12%	
Registered electors		487		
Turnout		395	81%	
Whig hold		Swing		

Time	Thomas Coglan		John Davies	
Time	Votes	%	Votes	%
10:00	27	54%	23	46%
11:00				
12:00	111	56%	89	45%
13:00	129	52%	121	48%
14:00	154	52%	145	48%
15:00	187	53%	163	47%
16:00	220	56%	175	44%

=== St. Paul's ===
No. 4 St. Paul's
Party	Candidate	Votes	%	±%
Conservative	George Wright	184	53%	
Whig	Christopher Rawdon *	163	47%	
Majority		21	6%	N/A
Registered electors		481		
Turnout		347	72%	
Conservative gain from Whig		Swing		

Time	George Wright		Christopher Rawdon	
Time	Votes	%	Votes	%
10:00	56	62%	35	38%
11:00	94			
12:00	121	55%	99	45%
13:00	136	54%	116	46%
14:00	153	54%	129	46%
15:00	166	54%	142	46%
16:00	184	53%	163	47%

=== St. Peter's ===
No. 7 St. Peter's
Party	Candidate	Votes	%	±%
Whig	John Woollright *	208	60%	
Conservative	Wilfred Troutbeck	137	40%	
Majority		71	20%	
Registered electors		607		
Turnout		345	57%	
Whig hold		Swing		

Time	John Woollright		Wilfred Troutbeck	
Time	Votes	%	Votes	%
10:00	34	60%	23	40%
11:00	74	59%	51	41%
12:00	106	59%	73	41%
13:00	130	58%	96	42%
14:00	146	57%	108	43%
15:00	170	58%	121	42%
16:00	208	60%	137	40%

=== Scotland ===
No. 2 Scotland
Party	Candidate	Votes	%	±%
Conservative	Isaac Holmes	228	54%	
Whig	Samuel Lacon	196	46%	
Majority		32	8%	N/A
Registered electors		534		
Turnout		424	79%	
Conservative gain from Whig		Swing		

Time	Isaac Holmes		Samuel L	
Time	Votes	%	Votes	%
10:00	57	48%	63	53%
11:00	86	57%	64	43%
12:00	106	53%	93	47%
13:00	133	53%	116	47%
14:00	158	53%	141	47%
15:00	185	53%	166	47%
16:00			196	

=== South Toxteth ===
No. 15 South Toxteth
Party	Candidate	Votes	%	±%
Whig	John Cropper *	145	57%	
Conservative	Thomas Murray Gladstone	108	43%	
Majority		37	14%	
Registered electors		355		
Turnout		253	71%	
Whig hold		Swing		

Time	John Cropper		Thomas Murray Gladstone	
Time	Votes	%	Votes	%
10:00	64	70%	28	30%
11:00	71	61%	45	39%
12:00	86	65%	47	35%
13:00	101	60%	68	40%
14:00	121	61%	79	40%
15:00	129	60%	85	40%
16:00	145	57%	108	43%

=== Vauxhall ===
No. 3 Vauxhall
Party	Candidate	Votes	%	±%
Conservative	Thomas Case	125	55%	
Whig	Enoch Harvey *	103	45%	
Majority		22	10%	N/A
Registered electors		311		
Turnout		228	73%	
Conservative gain from Whig		Swing		

Time	Thomas Case		Enoch Harvey	
Time	Votes	%	Votes	%
10:00	47	59%	33	41%
11:00	73	55%	59	45%
12:00	90	58%	66	42%
13:00	98	52%	89	48%
14:00	105	53%	93	47%
15:00	111	54%	94	46%
16:00	125	55%	103	45%

=== West Derby ===
No. 14 West Derby
Party	Candidate	Votes	%	±%
Conservative	John Shaw Leigh *	Unopposed		
Registered electors		470		
Conservative hold				

== Aldermanic Elections ==
On 9 November 1838, the term of office of eight of the sixteen aldermen expired.

The following were elected as Aldermen until 9 November 1844.

* - re-elected Alderman.

Party	Alderman
Reformers	Thomas Brockhurst Barclay *
Reformers	Eyre Evans *
Reformers	Thomas Holt
Reformers	James Moon *
Reformers	Thomas Bulley *
Reformers	William Purser Freme *
Reformers	William Earle
Reformers	Enoch Harvey

== See also ==
- Liverpool City Council
- Liverpool Town Council elections 1835 - 1879
- Liverpool City Council elections 1880–present
- Mayors and Lord Mayors of Liverpool 1207 to present
- History of local government in England
