= 1837 Liverpool Town Council election =

English local election

- 1 November 1837
	Reformers	Conservative
Party	Reformers	Conservative
Council Leader before election
Conservative
Council Leader after election
Reformers

Elections to Liverpool Town Council were held on Wednesday 1 November 1837. One third of the council seats were up for election, the term of office of each councillor being three years.

One of the sixteen wards was uncontested.

After the election, the composition of the council was:

Party	Councillors	±	Aldermen	Total
Reformers	33	-4	15	48
Conservative	15	+4	1	16

== Election result ==
Liverpool local election result 1837
Party	Seats	Gains	Losses	Net gain/loss	Seats %	Votes %	Votes	+/−
Whig	12	0	4	-4	75%	51%	3,093	
Conservative	4	4	0	+4	25%	49%	2,945	

== Ward results ==
* - Retiring Councillor seeking re-election

=== Abercromby ===
No. 11 Abercromby
Party	Candidate	Votes	%	±%
Whig	Dr. James Carson *	250	51%	
Conservative	Robertson Gladstone	245	49%	
Majority		5	2%	
Registered electors				
Turnout		495		
Whig hold		Swing		

=== Castle Street ===
No. 6 Castle Street
Party	Candidate	Votes	%	±%
Whig	Charles Birch *	Unopposed		
Registered electors				
Whig hold				

=== Everton ===
No. 1 Everton
Party	Candidate	Votes	%	±%
Conservative	David Hodgson	273	51%	
Whig	George Quayle *	258	49%	
Majority		15	2%	N/A
Registered electors				
Turnout		531		
Conservative gain from Whig		Swing		

=== Exchange ===
No. 5 Exchange
Party	Candidate	Votes	%	±%
Conservative	Thomas Sands	204	51%	
Whig	Lawrence Heyworth *	193	49%	
Majority		11	2%	N/A
Registered electors				
Turnout		397		
Conservative gain from Whig		Swing		

=== Great George ===
No. 9 Great George
Party	Candidate	Votes	%	±%
Conservative	Joseph Cooper	172	57%	
Whig	Hardman Earle	131	43%	
Majority		41	14%	N/A
Registered electors				
Turnout		303		
Conservative gain from Whig		Swing		

=== Lime Street ===
No. 12 Lime Street
Party	Candidate	Votes	%	±%
Whig	Thomas Blackburn *	328	57%	
Conservative	Ambrose Lace	252	43%	
Majority		76	14%	
Registered electors				
Turnout		580		
Whig hold		Swing		

=== North Toxteth ===
No. 16 North Toxteth
Party	Candidate	Votes	%	±%
Whig	William McMurdo Duncan *	232	55%	
Conservative	John Sheppard	191	45%	
Majority		41	10%	
Registered electors				
Turnout		423		
Whig hold		Swing		

=== Pitt Street ===
No. 8 Pitt Street
Party	Candidate	Votes	%	±%
Whig	William Rathbone *	229	52%	
Conservative	James Aspinall	208	48%	
Majority		21	4%	
Registered electors				
Turnout		437		
Whig hold		Swing		

=== Rodney Street ===
No. 10 Rodney Street
Party	Candidate	Votes	%	±%
Whig	William Lassell *	261	51%	
Conservative	John Wright	247	49%	
Majority		14	2%	
Registered electors				
Turnout		508		
Whig hold		Swing		

=== St. Anne Street ===
No. 13 St. Anne Street
Party	Candidate	Votes	%	±%
Whig	Edward Segar	214	51%	
Conservative	John Davies	205	49%	
Majority		9	2%	
Registered electors				
Turnout		419		
Whig hold		Swing		

=== St. Paul's ===
No. 4 St. Paul's
Party	Candidate	Votes	%	±%
Whig	Benjamin Frankland	163	51%	
Conservative	William Winstanley	155	49%	
Majority		8	2%	
Registered electors				
Turnout		318		
Whig hold		Swing		

=== St. Peter's ===
No. 7 St. Peter's
Party	Candidate	Votes	%	±%
Whig	John Priestly	192	53%	
Conservative	Henry R. Sandbach	168	47%	
Majority		24	6%	
Registered electors				
Turnout		360		
Whig hold		Swing		

=== Scotland ===
No. 2 Scotland
Party	Candidate	Votes	%	±%
Whig	William Thornhill *	230	51%	
Conservative	Thomas Berry Horsfall	217	49%	
Majority		13	2%	
Registered electors				
Turnout		447		
Whig hold		Swing		

=== South Toxteth ===
No. 15 South Toxteth
Party	Candidate	Votes	%	±%
Whig	John Platt	134	51%	
Conservative	Alexander Smith jnr	129	49%	
Majority		5	2%	
Registered electors				
Turnout		263		
Whig hold		Swing		

=== Vauxhall ===
No. 3 Vauxhall
Party	Candidate	Votes	%	±%
Whig	William Preston	114	56%	
Conservative	Thomas Case	91	44%	
Majority		23	12%	
Registered electors				
Turnout		205		
Whig hold		Swing		

=== West Derby ===
No. 14 West Derby
Party	Candidate	Votes	%	±%
Conservative	George Hall Lawrence	188	53%	
Whig	George Holt *	164	47%	
Majority		24	6%	N/A
Registered electors				
Turnout		352		
Conservative gain from Whig		Swing		

== See also ==
- Liverpool City Council
- Liverpool Town Council elections 1835 - 1879
- Liverpool City Council elections 1880–present
- Mayors and Lord Mayors of Liverpool 1207 to present
- History of local government in England
