= 1840 Liverpool Town Council election =

English local election

← 1839	1 November 1840	1841 →
	Reformers	Conservative
Party	Reformers	Conservative
Council Leader before election
Conservative
Council Leader after election
Reformers

Elections to Liverpool Town Council were held on Wednesday 1 November 1840. One third of the council seats were up for election, the term of office of each councillor being three years.

All of the sixteen wards were contested.

After the election, the composition of the council was:

Party	Councillors	±	Aldermen	Total
Reformers	22	-6	16	38
Conservative	26	+6	0	26

== Election result ==
Liverpool local election result 1840
Party	Seats	Gains	Losses	Net gain/loss	Seats %	Votes %	Votes	+/−
Whig	6	0	6	-6	37%	49%	3,227	
Conservative	10	6	0	+6	63%	51%	3,414	

== Ward results ==
* - Retiring Councillor seeking re-election

=== Abercromby ===
No. 11 Abercromby
Party	Candidate	Votes	%	±%
Conservative	James Procter	317	53%	
Whig	Thomas Todd	282	47%	
Majority		35	6%	N/A
Registered electors				
Turnout		599		
Conservative gain from Whig		Swing		

Time	James Procter		Thomas Todd	
Time	Votes	%	Votes	%
10:00	63	50%	64	50%
11:00	142	52%	131	48%
12:00	176	51%	171	49%
13:00	214			
14:00				
15:00				
16:00	317	53%	282	47%

=== Castle Street ===
No. 6 Castle Street
Party	Candidate	Votes	%	±%
Whig	James Aikin	228	53%	
Conservative	Peter Hope	206	47%	
Majority		22	6%	
Registered electors				
Turnout		434		
Whig hold		Swing		

Time	James Aikin		Peter Hope	
Time	Votes	%	Votes	%
10:00	65	65%	35	35%
11:00	115	56%	90	44%
12:00	148	54%	127	46%
13:00	170	54%	143	46%
14:00	178	52%	162	48%
15:00	206	53%	181	47%
16:00	228	53%	206	47%

=== Everton ===
No. 1 Everton
Party	Candidate	Votes	%	±%
Conservative	David Hodgson *	308	52%	
Whig	William Brown	287	48%	
Majority		21	4%	
Registered electors				
Turnout		595		
Conservative hold		Swing		

Time	David Hodgson		William Brown	
Time	Votes	%	Votes	%
10:00	109	57%	81	43%
11:00	155	54%	132	46%
12:00	185	54%	158	46%
13:00	213	55%	177	45%
14:00	230	55%	200	47%
15:00	271	54%	228	46%
16:00	308	52%	287	48%

=== Exchange ===
No. 5 Exchange
Party	Candidate	Votes	%	±%
Conservative	Thomas Sands *	190	54%	
Whig	William Wood	160	46%	
Majority		30	8%	
Registered electors				
Turnout		350		
Conservative hold		Swing		

Time	Thomas Sands		William Wood	
Time	Votes	%	Votes	%
10:00	50	65%	27	35%
11:00	101	62%	61	38%
12:00	132	58%	95	42%
13:00	154	58%	111	42%
14:00	171	57%	131	435
15:00	191	55%	154	45%
16:00	199	54%	168	46%

=== Great George ===
No. 9 Great George
Party	Candidate	Votes	%	±%
Conservative	Joseph Cooper *	180	51%	
Whig	Thomas Taylor	172	49%	
Majority		8	2%	
Registered electors				
Turnout		352		
Conservative hold		Swing		

Time	Joseph Cooper		Thomas Taylor	
Time	Votes	%	Votes	%
10:00	56	51%	53	49%
11:00	94	51%	89	49%
12:00	115	49.6%	117	50.4%
13:00	140	50.4%	138	49.6%
14:00	154	51%	150	49%
15:00	170	55%	157	48%
16:00	180	51%	172	49%

=== Lime Street ===
No. 12 Lime Street
Party	Candidate	Votes	%	±%
Whig	Thomas Blackburn *	390	50.1%	
Conservative	John Kilshaw	388	49.9%	
Majority		2	0.2%	
Registered electors				
Turnout		778		
Whig hold		Swing		

Time	Thomas Blackburn		John Kilshaw	
Time	Votes	%	Votes	%
10:00	64	52%	60	48%
11:00	116			
12:00			166	
13:00			223	
14:00	279	51%	271	49%
15:00	324			
16:00	390	50.1%	388	49.9%

=== North Toxteth ===
No. 16 North Toxteth
Party	Candidate	Votes	%	±%
Conservative	Richard Harbord	240	51%	
Whig	William McMurdo Duncan *	233	49%	
Majority		7	2%	N/A
Registered electors				
Turnout		473		
Conservative gain from Whig		Swing		

Time	Richard Harbord		William McMurdo Duncan	
Time	Votes	%	Votes	%
10:00			33	
11:00	74	49%	76	51%
12:00	101			
13:00	167	51%	158	49%
14:00	199	51%	189	49%
15:00	219			
16:00	240		233	49%

=== Pitt Street ===
No. 8 Pitt Street
Party	Candidate	Votes	%	±%
Conservative	Thomas Toulmin	189	50.1%	
Whig	William Rathbone *	188	49.9%	
Majority		1	0.2%	N/A
Registered electors				
Turnout		377		
Conservative gain from Whig		Swing		

Time	Thomas Toulmin		William Rathbone	
Time	Votes	%	Votes	%
10:00	75	57%	56	43%
11:00	105	56%	84	44%
12:00	135	54%	115	46%
13:00	149	53%	134	47%
14:00	164	53%	146	47%
15:00	170	51%	164	49%
16:00	189	50.1%	188	49.9%

=== Rodney Street ===
No. 10 Rodney Street
Party	Candidate	Votes	%	±%
Conservative	William Birkett	269	56%	
Whig	Charles Holland	212	44%	
Majority		57	12%	N/A
Registered electors				
Turnout		481		
Conservative gain from Whig		Swing		

Time	William Birkett		Charles Holland	
Time	Votes	%	Votes	%
10:00			56	
11:00			77	
12:00	111	57%	84	43%
13:00			134	
14:00				
15:00			182	
16:00	269	56%	212	44%

=== St. Anne Street ===
No. 13 St. Anne Street
Party	Candidate	Votes	%	±%
Whig	William Slater	192	51%	
Conservative	John Davies	188	49%	
Majority		4	2%	
Registered electors				
Turnout		380		
Whig hold		Swing		

Time	William Slater		John Davies	
Time	Votes	%	Votes	%
10:00	40	53%	35	47%
11:00	66	57%	50	43%
12:00	95	54%	82	46%
13:00	117	49%	120	51%
14:00	148	50%	150	50%
15:00	167	51%	162	49%
16:00	192	51%	188	49%

=== St. Paul's ===
No. 4 St. Paul's
Party	Candidate	Votes	%	±%
Conservative	Richard Benson Blundell Hollinshead Blundell	177	51%	
Whig	John Rowland McGuffie	167	49%	
Majority		10	2%	N/A
Registered electors				
Turnout		344		
Conservative gain from Whig		Swing		

Time	Richard Benson Blundell Hollinshead Blundell		John Rowland McGuffie	
Time	Votes	%	Votes	%
10:00	72	51%	68	49%
11:00	86	50.3%	85	49.7%
12:00	99	52%	90	48%
13:00	131	52%	123	48%
14:00	146	53%	131	47%
15:00	167	52%	152	48%
16:00	177	51%	167	49%

=== St. Peter's ===
No. 7 St. Peter's
Party	Candidate	Votes	%	±%
Whig	John Priestley *	156	53%	
Conservative	Ebenezer Rae	137	47%	
Majority		19	6%	
Registered electors				
Turnout		293		
Whig hold		Swing		

Time	John Priestley		Ebenezer Rae	
Time	Votes	%	Votes	%
10:00	41	47%	47	53%
11:00	70	49%	73	51%
12:00	97	53%	86	47%
13:00	108	53%	97	47%
14:00	127	53%	113	47%
15:00	146	55%	121	45%
16:00	156	53%	137	47%

=== Scotland ===
No. 2 Scotland
Party	Candidate	Votes	%	±%
Whig	William Thornhill *	215	50.1%	
Conservative	Thomas Murray Gladstone	214	49.9%	
Majority		1	0.2%	
Registered electors				
Turnout		429		
Whig hold		Swing		

Time	William Thornhill		Thomas Murray Gladstone	
Time	Votes	%	Votes	%
10:00	33	45%	40	55%
11:00	79	48%	85	52%
12:00	104	48%	112	52%
13:00	121	48%	129	52%
14:00	166	52%	155	48%
15:00	182	49.7%	184	50.3%
16:00	215	51.1%	214	49.9%

=== South Toxteth ===
No. 15 South Toxteth
Party	Candidate	Votes	%	±%
Whig	John Platt *	144	51%	
Conservative	J. Shepperd	138	49%	
Majority		6	2%	
Registered electors				
Turnout		282		
Whig hold		Swing		

Time	John Platt		John Shepperd	
Time	Votes	%	Votes	%
10:00	30	45%	36	55%
11:00	76	58%	56	42%
12:00				
13:00	107	54%	91	46%
14:00	122	54%	106	46%
15:00	129	51%	122	49%
16:00	144	51%	138	49%

=== Vauxhall ===
No. 3 Vauxhall
Party	Candidate	Votes	%	±%
Conservative	Henry Copeland	108	53%	
Whig	William Preston *	96	47%	
Majority		12	6%	N/A
Registered electors				
Turnout		204		
Conservative gain from Whig		Swing		

Time	Henry Copeland		William Preston	
Time	Votes	%	Votes	%
10:00	44	56%	35	44%
11:00	56	56%	44	44%
12:00	69	55%	56	45%
13:00	80	58%	57	42%
14:00	84	56%	66	44%
15:00	100	56%	77	44%
16:00	108	56%	86	44%

=== West Derby ===
No. 14 West Derby
Party	Candidate	Votes	%	±%
Conservative	George Hall Lawrence *	156	62%	
Whig	Lawrence Heyworth jun.	95	38%	
Majority		61	24%	
Registered electors				
Turnout		251		
Conservative hold		Swing		

Time	George Hall Lawrence		Lawrence Heyworth jun.	
Time	Votes	%	Votes	%
10:00	85	78%	24	22%
11:00	128	74%	46	26%
12:00	138	71%	56	29%
13:00	139	66%	71	34%
14:00	149	64%	83	36%
15:00	155	63%	91	37%
16:00	156	62%	96	38%

== See also ==
- Liverpool Town Council elections 1835 - 1879
- Liverpool City Council elections 1880–present
- Mayors and Lord Mayors of Liverpool 1207 to present
- History of local government in England
