= 1836 Liverpool Town Council election =

English local election

- 2 November 1836
	Reformers	Conservative
Party	Reformers	Conservative
Council Leader before election
Conservative
Council Leader after election
Reformers

Elections to Liverpool Town Council were held on Tuesday 2 November 1836. One third of the council seats were up for election, the term of office of each councillor being three years.

All of the sixteen wards were contested. In addition there was also a by-election in South Toxteth.

After the election, the composition of the council was:

Party	Councillors	±	Aldermen	Total
Reformers	37	-6	15	52
Conservative	11	+6	1	12

== Election result ==
Liverpool local election result 1836
Party	Seats	Gains	Losses	Net gain/loss	Seats %	Votes %	Votes	+/−
Whig	9	0	6	-6	50%	49.7%		
Conservative	8	6	0	+6	50%	50.3%		

== Ward results ==
* - Retiring Councillor seeking re-election

=== Abercromby ===
No. 11 Abercromby
Party	Candidate	Votes	%	±%
Whig	Thomas Brocklebank *	192	53%	
Conservative	Thomas Kaye	168	47%	
Majority		24	6%	
Registered electors		568		
Turnout		360	63%	
Whig hold		Swing		

=== Castle Street ===
No. 6 Castle Street
Party	Candidate	Votes	%	±%
Whig	Thomas Bolton *	188	70%	
Conservative	John Wilkinson	79	30%	
Majority		24	40%	
Registered electors		627		
Turnout		267	43%	
Whig hold		Swing		

=== Everton ===
No. 1 Everton
Party	Candidate	Votes	%	±%
Conservative	James Heyworth	206	50.1%	
Whig	George Quayle	205	49.9%	
Majority		1	0.2%	
Registered electors		562		
Turnout		411	73%	
Conservative hold		Swing		

=== Exchange ===
No. 5 Exchange
Party	Candidate	Votes	%	±%
Whig	James Mellor *	173	50.1%	
Conservative	Thomas Sands	172	49.9%	
Majority		1	0.2%	
Registered electors		513		
Turnout		345	67%	
Whig hold		Swing		

=== Great George ===
No. 9 Great George
Party	Candidate	Votes	%	±%
Conservative	Charles Lawrence	160	55%	
Whig	Henry Ripley	130	45%	
Majority		30	10%	N/A
Registered electors		404		
Turnout		290	72%	
Conservative gain from Whig		Swing		

=== Lime Street ===
No. 12 Lime Street
Party	Candidate	Votes	%	±%
Whig	Vincent Higgins	295	52%	
Conservative	Ambrose Lace	275	48%	
Majority		20	4%	
Registered electors		744		
Turnout		570	77%	
Whig hold		Swing		

=== North Toxteth ===
No. 16 North Toxteth
Party	Candidate	Votes	%	±%
Whig	George Ramsden	195	59%	
Conservative	John Sheppard	133	41%	
Majority		62	18%	
Registered electors		538		
Turnout		328	61%	
Whig hold		Swing		

=== Pitt Street ===
No. 8 Pitt Street
Party	Candidate	Votes	%	±%
Conservative	John Bibby	199	55%	
Whig	William Robert Preston *	151	43%	
Majority		48	12%	N/A
Registered electors		551		
Turnout		350	64%	
Conservative gain from Whig		Swing		

=== Rodney Street ===
No. 10 Rodney Street
Party	Candidate	Votes	%	±%
Conservative	John Nelson Wood	217	53%	
Whig	Thomas Holt *	193	47%	
Majority		24	6%	N/A
Registered electors		575		
Turnout		410	71%	
Conservative gain from Whig		Swing		

=== St. Anne Street ===
No. 13 St. Anne Street
Party	Candidate	Votes	%	±%
Whig	Joseph Mason	200	53%	
Conservative	John N. Wright	180	47%	
Majority		20	6%	
Registered electors		477		
Turnout		380	80%	
Whig hold		Swing		

=== St. Paul's ===
No. 4 St. Paul's
Party	Candidate	Votes	%	±%
Conservative	John Barton *	138	54%	
Whig	James Stitt	116	46%	
Majority		22	8%	
Registered electors		340		
Turnout		254	75%	
Conservative hold		Swing	+8%	

=== St. Peter's ===
No. 7 St. Peter's
Party	Candidate	Votes	%	±%
Whig	Richard Bright *	199	51%	
Conservative	Nathan Litherland	192	49%	
Majority		7	2%	
Registered electors		596		
Turnout		391	66%	
Whig hold		Swing	-3%	

=== Scotland ===
No. 2 Scotland
Party	Candidate	Votes	%	±%
Conservative	Richard Houghton	196	74%	▲34%
Whig	Richard Shiel *	68	26%	▼28%
Majority		128	48%	N/A
Registered electors		491		
Turnout		264	54%	
Conservative gain from Whig		Swing		

=== South Toxteth ===
No. 15 South Toxteth - 2 seats
Party	Candidate	Votes	%	±%
Whig	John Platt	112	53%	
Whig	Francis Jordan *	109	53%	
Conservative	Alexander Smith	100	47%	
Conservative	Thomas M. Gladstone	98	47%	
Majority		12	6%	
Registered electors		279		
Turnout		212	76%	
Whig hold		Swing		
Whig hold		Swing		

=== Vauxhall ===
No. 3 Vauxhall
Party	Candidate	Votes	%	±%
Conservative	William Shand	107	55%	
Whig	James Muspratt	89	45%	
Majority		18	10%	N/A
Registered electors		279		
Turnout		196	70%	
Conservative gain from Whig		Swing		

=== West Derby ===
No. 14 West Derby
Party	Candidate	Votes	%	±%
Conservative	John Smith	165	54%	
Whig	R. W. Wood	138	46%	
Majority		27	8%	
Registered electors		405		
Turnout		303	75%	
Conservative hold		Swing		

== See also ==
Liverpool City Council

Liverpool Town Council elections 1835 - 1879

Liverpool City Council elections 1880–present

Mayors and Lord Mayors of Liverpool 1207 to present

History of local government in England
