= James Mellor =

British businessman (17??-1860)

James Mellor (died 18 August 1860) was a Liverpool merchant, local politician, and friend of Richard Cobden.

== Life ==
Mellor was a brewer, wine and spirit merchant, and maltster. The brewery James Mellor & Sons was founded in 1823, in Hunter Street, Liverpool. The wine and spirit dealers John Mellor & Co., involving John, James and Thomas Mellor, was dissolved in 1835. The brewery business survived to 1974, when it merged with Higsons Brewery.

In the 1835 Liverpool Town Council election, the first for the council following the Municipal Corporations Act 1835, Mellor was one of six candidates for the Exchange ward. He polled third, and was elected, with Henry Holmes and Lawrence Heyworth. The burgess roll for 1846 places his counting house in Exchange Alley North.

In 1840, Mellor was one of two Liverpool delegates to a large Anti-Corn Law League rally in Manchester, in a large temporary structure on the site of the future Free Trade Hall. He was prominent in the Liverpool Anti-Monopoly Association, allied to the League, and at the Liverpool free trade rally of 1843 proposed William Rathbone V as chair. In November 1845, he was one of a delegation, with Thomas Thornely, David Brown and James Mullaneux, calling on the Mayor of Liverpool, and asking what steps were being taken over the potato crop failure affecting Ireland.

Mellor was a member of the Financial Reform Council. Cobden paid him a visit in Liverpool in 1848, meeting there other members of the Council. He was at this time, possibly, a cotton broker.

At the end of Mellor's life, his address was Cleveland Square, Hyde Park, London. His daughter Martha and husband were living with him. He died at Ilkley in Yorkshire.

== Family ==
Mellor's children:

- Alice, married in 1839 William Hargreaves, seventh son of the calico spinner Thomas Hargreaves, and a close friend of Cobden. Their daughter Mary Constance married Sir Joseph Leese, 1st Baronet.
- Martha (1815–1906) married Abraham Walter Paulton and was mother of James Mellor Paulton

Relationship Unknown, not a son.

- George Henry (1853–1910), barrister.
