= 1835 Liverpool Town Council election =

English local election

- 26 December 1835

48 new seats were up for election for the first time: three seats for each of the new 16 wards 33 (incl. 16 Aldermen) seats needed for a majority
- Registered: 6,803
- Turnout: 80.36%
	First party	Second party
	Reformers	Conservative
Party	Reformers	Conservative
Seats won	44	4
Popular vote	3,213	2,254
Percentage	59%	41%
Council Leader before election
Conservative
Council Leader after election
Reformers

Elections to Liverpool Town Council were held on Saturday 26 December 1835.

This was the first democratic election to Liverpool Town Council. The predecessor council, the Common Council, elected new members itself. This election was conducted under the provisions of the Municipal Corporations Act 1835. As this was the first election to the council, all three seats for each of the sixteen wards were up for election. The candidate in each ward with the highest number of votes was elected for three years, the candidate with the second highest number of votes was elected for two years and the candidate with the third highest number of votes was elected for one year. All of the sixteen wards were contested.

The local press, at the time, referred exclusively to candidates as Reformers or Conservatives.

== Members of the preceding Corporation of Liverpool that was replaced by the Liverpool Town Council ==
The Liverpool Corporation consisted of 17 aldermen, including the mayor, and 19 members of the Common Council.

Party	Position	Name
	Mayor	James Aspinall
	Recorder	James Clarke
	Alderman	George Case
	Alderman	P. W. Brancker
	Alderman	John Bourne
	Alderman	Samuel Staniforth
Conservative	Alderman	John Wright
	Alderman	Thomas Case
	Alderman	Sir John Tobin
	Alderman	Richard Leyland
Conservative	Alderman	Charles Lawrence
Conservative	Alderman	Peter Bourne
	Alderman	Thomas Littledale
	Alderman	Nicholas Robinson
	Alderman	Sir George Drinkwater
Conservative	Alderman	Sir Thomas Brancker
	Alderman	Samuel Sandbach
Conservative	Alderman	Charles Horsefall
Conservative	Bailiff	Ambrose Lace
	Bailiff	James Pownall
	Town Clerk	Thomas Foster
Common Council
Party		Name
		Thomas Corrie
Whig		William Wallace Currie
		John Deane Case
		Isaac Oldham Bold
Whig		William Earle
Conservative		John Shaw Leigh
Conservative		William Ripley
		Henry Moss
		John Ewart
		Samuel Thompson
Conservative		Richard Houghton
		Anthony Molyneux
		Thomas Shaw
Conservative		Richard B. B. Hollinshead
		Henry Ashton
Conservative		Robertson Gladstone
		James Crosbie
		James Cockshot
		Joseph N. Walker

== Members of the preceding Liverpool Common Council who sought election to the Liverpool Town Council ==
Party	Candidate	Ward Standing	Elected
Conservative	Charles Horsfall	Everton and Kirkdale	Yes
Conservative	Richard Houghton	Scotland	No
Conservative	John Wright	Vauxhall	No
Conservative	R. B. B. Hollinshhead	St. Paul's	No
Conservative	Sir Thomas Brancker	Castle Street	No
Conservative	Charles Lawrence	Great George	No
Reformers	William Earle jun.	Abercromby	Yes
Conservative	Robertson Gladstone	Abercromby	No
Conservative	William Ripley	Abercromby	No
Conservative	Ambrose Lace	Lime Street	No
Conservative	John Shaw Leigh	West Derby	Yes
Conservative	Charles Lawrence	Great George	Yes
Reformers	W. W. Currie	North Toxteth	Yes

== Composition of the Council ==
After the election of Councillors on 26 December 1835 and the Aldermanic election in January 1836, the composition of the council was:

Party	Councillors	Aldermen	Total
Reformers	44	15	59
Conservative	4	1	5

== Election result ==
Liverpool local election result 1835
Party	Seats	Gains	Losses	Net gain/loss	Seats %	Votes %	Votes	+/−
Reformers	44	N/A	N/A	N/A	92%	59%	3,213	
Conservative	4	N/A	N/A	N/A	8%	41%	2,254	

== Ward results ==
* - Previously a member of the preceding Common Council

=== Everton and Kirkdale ===
No. 1 Everton and Kirkdale - 3 seats
Party	Candidate	Votes	%	±%
Reformer	John Holmes	224	51%	N/A
Reformer	S. Hope	215	49%	N/A
Conservative	Charles Horsfall *	214	49%	N/A
Reformer	Joseph Hornby	211		N/A
Conservative	Adam Hodgson	195		N/A
Conservative	W. C. Molyneux	193		N/A
Majority		10		N/A
Registered electors		503		
Turnout		438	87%	N/A
Whig win (new seat)				
Whig win (new seat)				
Conservative win (new seat)				

The polling place for the township of Kirkdale was Mrs. Stretch's public house in Kirkdale Village.

The polling place for Everton township was Halliday's, Everton Coffee-house

=== Scotland ===
No. 2 Scotland - 3 seats
Party	Candidate	Votes	%	±%
Whig	Crawford Logan	177	60%	N/A
Whig	William Thornhill	171	58%	N/A
Whig	Richard Shiel	159	54%	N/A
Conservative	Richard Houghton *	118	40%	N/A
Conservative	James Heyworth	96	33%	N/A
Conservative	Mr. Foster	89	30%	N/A
Majority		59		N/A
Registered electors		345		
Turnout		295	86%	N/A
Whig win (new seat)				
Whig win (new seat)				
Whig win (new seat)				

The Polling place was Mr. Horner's at the corner of Eccles-street and Vauxhall-road.

=== Vauxhall ===
No. 3 Vauxhall - 3 seats
Party	Candidate	Votes	%	±%
Whig	Enoch Harvey	92	55%	N/A
Whig	Egerton Smith	86	51%	N/A
Whig	J. D. Thornely	80	48%	N/A
Conservative	Henry Coupland	76	45%	N/A
Conservative	John Wright *	74	44%	N/A
Conservative	Joseph Ackers	66	39%	N/A
Majority		16		N/A
Registered electors		201		
Turnout		168	84%	N/A
Whig win (new seat)				
Whig win (new seat)				
Whig win (new seat)				

The polling place was at the Vauxhall Vaults, corner of Banastre-street and Vauxhall-road.

=== St. Paul's ===
No. 4 St. Paul's - 3 seats
Party	Candidate	Votes	%	±%
Whig	Christopher Rawdon	137	54%	N/A
Whig	Alexander McGregor	124	48%	N/A
Conservative	John Barton	119	46%	N/A
Whig	William Stuart	117	46%	N/A
Conservative	R. B. B. Hollinshead *	102	40%	N/A
Conservative	William Shand	89	35%	N/A
Majority		18		N/A
Registered electors		297		
Turnout		256	86%	N/A
Whig win (new seat)				
Whig win (new seat)				
Conservative win (new seat)				

Polling place : At Mather's Baths, corner of St. Paul's-square and Virginia-street

=== Exchange ===
No. 5 Exchange - 3 seats
Party	Candidate	Votes	%	±%
Whig	James Holmes	179	56%	N/A
Whig	Lawrence Heyworth	167	53%	N/A
Whig	James Mellor	161	51%	N/A
Conservative	Thomas Sands	139	44%	N/A
Conservative	John Bent	126	40%	N/A
Conservative	G. B. Irlam	118	37%	N/A
Majority		40		N/A
Registered electors		468		
Turnout		318		N/A
Whig win (new seat)				
Whig win (new seat)				
Whig win (new seat)				

Polling places : Surnames A to K : at the south end of the Sessions'-house in South Chapel-street. Surnames L to Z : at the north end of the Sessions'-house in Chapel-street.

=== Castle Street ===
No. 6 Castle Street - 3 seats
Party	Candidate	Votes	%	±%
Whig	Joshua Walmsley	260	73%	N/A
Whig	Charles Birch	259	73%	N/A
Whig	Thomas Bolton	248	70%	N/A
Conservative	Sir Thomas Brancker *	96	27%	
Conservative	George Grant	83	23%	N/A
Conservative	Mr. Wood	78	22%	N/A
Majority		164		N/A
Registered electors		604		
Turnout		356	59%	N/A
Whig win (new seat)				
Whig win (new seat)				
Whig win (new seat)				

Polling place : At the two windows of the King's Arms Hotel fronting Castle-street

=== St. Peter's ===
No. 7 St. Peter's - 3 seats
Party	Candidate	Votes	%	±%
Whig	John Woollright	205	59%	N/A
Whig	William Rushton	200	57%	N/A
Whig	Richard Bright	190	54%	N/A
Conservative	Mr. Potter	145	41%	N/A
Conservative	Nathan Litherland	143	41%	N/A
Conservative	Thomas Tobin	142	41%	N/A
Majority		60		N/A
Registered electors		548		
Turnout		359	64%	N/A
Whig win (new seat)				
Whig win (new seat)				
Whig win (new seat)				

Polling place : At the two windows of the Horse and Jockey public-house fronting Seel-street

=== Pitt Street ===
No. 8 Pitt Street - 3 seats
Party	Candidate	Votes	%	±%
Whig	Hugh Hornby	201	56%	N/A
Whig	William Rathbone	193	54%	N/A
Whig	William Robert Preston	184	51%	N/A
Conservative	John Bibby	158	44%	N/A
Conservative	Peter Bourne	151	42%	N/A
Conservative	T. C. Molyneux	140	39%	N/A
Majority		43		N/A
Registered electors		532		
Turnout		359	67%	N/A
Whig win (new seat)				
Whig win (new seat)				
Whig win (new seat)				

Polling place : At two compartments in the South Free School in Park-lane.

=== Great George ===
No. 9 Great George
Party	Candidate	Votes	%	±%
Whig	James Lawrence	237	64%	N/A
Whig	Wellwood Maxwell	146	40%	N/A
Whig	James Aikin	135	37%	N/A
Conservative	Charles Lawrence *	131	36%	N/A
Conservative	Joseph Cooper	108	29%	N/A
Majority		106		N/A
Registered electors		335		
Turnout				N/A
Whig win (new seat)				
Whig win (new seat)				
Whig win (new seat)				

Polling place : At a warehouse, east side of St. James's-street, near the corner of St. Vincent-street.

=== Rodney Street ===
No. 10 Rodney Street - 3 seats
Party	Candidate	Votes	%	±%
Conservative	Henry Lawrence	198	50.1%	N/A
Whig	William Lassell	197	49.9%	N/A
Whig	Thomas Holt	194	49%	N/A
Conservative	Dr. J. P. Brandreth	192	49%	N/A
Conservative	John H. Turner	182	46%	N/A
Whig	Eyre Evans	179	45%	N/A
Majority		1		N/A
Registered electors		478		
Turnout		395	83%	N/A
Conservative win (new seat)				
Whig win (new seat)				
Whig win (new seat)				

Polling place : A to K : at a new shop at the entrance of the New Arcade from Renshaw Street. L to Z : at a window of an empty-house, opposite the Unitarian Chapel, in Renshaw-street.

=== Abercromby ===
No. 11 Abercromby - 3 seats
Party	Candidate	Votes	%	±%
Whig	William Earle jun. *	186	56%	N/A
Whig	Jas. Carson M.D.	184	55%	N/A
Whig	Thomas Brocklebank	172	52%	N/A
Conservative	Robertson Gladstone *	147	44%	N/A
Conservative	Thomas Kaye	141	42%	N/A
Conservative	William Ripley *	129	39%	N/A
Majority		39		N/A
Registered electors		373		
Turnout		333	89%	N/A
Whig win (new seat)				
Whig win (new seat)				
Whig win (new seat)				

Polling place : At the Phoenix Inn, at the top of Mount Pleasant

=== Lime Street ===
No. 12 Lime Street - 3 seats
Party	Candidate	Votes	%	±%
Whig	Mr. Langton	308	62%	N/A
Whig	Thomas Blackburn	302	61%	N/A
Whig	R. Roskell	292	59%	N/A
Conservative	Ambrose Lace *	190	38%	N/A
Conservative	Robert Rigby	176	35%	N/A
Conservative	J. Todd Naylor	170	34%	N/A
Majority		118		N/A
Registered electors		633		
Turnout		498	79%	N/A
Whig win (new seat)				
Whig win (new seat)				
Whig win (new seat)				

Polling places : A to K : at a window in the Black Bell Inn, London-road. L to Z : at a window in Challinor's Public-house, on the opposite side of London-road.

=== St. Anne Street ===
No. 13 St. Anne Street - 3 seats
Party	Candidate	Votes	%	±%
Whig	Richard Alison	288	67%	N/A
Whig	Thomas Coglan	195	46%	N/A
Whig	Edward Cropper	191		N/A
Conservative	Edward Gibbon	139	33%	N/A
Conservative	John Davies	132	31%	N/A
Conservative	Richard Jones	127	30%	N/A
Majority		149		N/A
Registered electors		393		
Turnout				N/A
Whig win (new seat)				
Whig win (new seat)				
Whig win (new seat)				

Polling place : At the Pontack's Public-house, in Christian-street.

=== West Derby ===
No. 14 West Derby - 3 seats
Party	Candidate	Votes	%	±%
Conservative	John Shaw Leigh *	172	50.9%	N/A
Whig	George Holt	166	49.4%	N/A
Conservative	Joseph Sanders	153	45%	N/A
Whig	William Purser Freme	153	45%	N/A
Whig	William Blaine	152		N/A
Conservative	William P. Bushby	136	40%	N/A
Majority		6		N/A
Registered electors		370		
Turnout		338	91%	N/A
Conservative win (new seat)				
Whig win (new seat)				
Conservative win (new seat)				

Polling place : At the Edge-hill Coffee-house.

=== South Toxteth ===
No. 15 South Toxteth - 3 seats
Party	Candidate	Votes	%	±%
Whig	John Cropper	114	59%	N/A
Whig	W. Sharples	99	51%	N/A
Whig	Francis Jordan	92	47%	N/A
Conservative	Mr. Fletcher	80	41%	N/A
Conservative	Mr. Smith	75	39%	N/A
Conservative	N. Robinson	65	34%	
Majority		34		N/A
Registered electors		230		
Turnout		194	84%	N/A
Whig win (new seat)				
Whig win (new seat)				
Whig win (new seat)				

Polling place : At the southernmost of the Shops recently built by Dr. Hughes, on the west side of Park-road.

=== North Toxteth ===
No. 16 North Toxteth - 3 seats
Party	Candidate	Votes	%	±%
Whig	W. W. Currie *	242	65%	N/A
Whig	Mr. Duncan	223	60%	N/A
Whig	C. Tayleur	222	59%	N/A
Conservative	Mr. Troughton	132	35%	N/A
Conservative	Mr. Gibbons	130	35%	N/A
Conservative	James Dempsey	90	24%	N/A
Majority		110		N/A
Registered electors		493		
Turnout		374	76%	N/A
Whig win (new seat)				
Whig win (new seat)				
Whig win (new seat)				

Polling place : At two windows of the Royal Oak Public-house, at the corner of Upper Warwick-street and Park-place.

== Aldermanic elections ==
At the meeting of the Council in January 1836, sixteen Aldermen were elected by the Council, eight for a term of six years and eight for a term of three years.

Party	Alderman	Term expires	Ward
Reformers	William Stuart	1841	
Reformers	Thomas Booth	1841	
Reformers	Joseph Hornby	1841	
Reformers	William Brown	1841	
Reformers	Thomas Leathom	1841	
Reformers	Thomas Smith (Toxteth park)	1841	
Reformers	Robert Benn	1841	
Reformers	Christopher Hird Jones	1841	
Reformers	Thomas Bulley	1838	
Reformers	Eyre Evans	1838	
Reformers	William Blaine	1838	
Reformers	James Moon	1838	
Reformers	William Purser Freme	1838	
Reformers	Thomas Brockhurst Barclay	1838	
Reformers	George Robinson	1838	
Conservative	Ormerod Heyworth	1838	

== By-elections ==
=== No. 12, Lime Street, 7 January 1836 ===
Caused by the disqualification of Joseph Langton (Reformers, Lime Street, elected 26 December 1835) because he did not sign the councillors' declaration. Mr. Langton was the manager of the Bank of Liverpool and the directors of the bank did not think him being a town councillor was compatible with his role as manager of the bank.

No. 12 Lime Street 7 January 1836
Party	Candidate	Votes	%	±%
Whig	Thomas Morecroft	270	56%	
Conservative	John Holmes	209	44%	
Majority		61	12%	
Registered electors		633		
Turnout		479	76%	
Whig hold		Swing		

== See also ==
- Liverpool City Council
- Liverpool Town Council elections 1835 - 1879
- Liverpool City Council elections 1880–present
- Mayors and Lord Mayors of Liverpool 1207 to present
- History of local government in England
