= Abercromby (Liverpool ward) =

Former ward of Liverpool City Council (UK)

- Abercromby ward (1980) within Liverpool
- Registered Electors: 11,020 (2003 election)
- Metropolitan borough: City of Liverpool
- Metropolitan county: Merseyside
- Region: North West
- Country: England
- Sovereign state: United Kingdom

Abercromby ward was an electoral division of Liverpool City Council.

== Background ==
The ward was originally created in 1835, its boundaries were changed in 1953, merged with St James ward in 1974 and was recreated in 1980 before being dissolved in 2004.

=== 1835 boundaries ===
The ward was created in 1835 as an original ward of Liverpool Town Council under the provisions of the Municipal Corporations Act 1835. This was the first democratically elected council replacing the previous Liverpool Common Council. Three councillors were returned to the council by Abercromby Ward.

By 1860 the ward boundary commenced from London Road at its junction with Norton Street and Seymour Street, proceeding eastwards along Pembroke Place, thereafter southeastwards along Crown Street to its junction with Falkner Street, westwards along said street to Hope Street, proceeding northwards to Mount Pleasant, thereafter westwards towards Clarence Street, continuing along Russell Street and Seymour Street to the point of commencement.

From 1835 to 1885 the ward was part of the Liverpool Parliamentary constituency, from 1885 to 1918 part of the Liverpool Abercromby Parliamentary constituency, and from 1918 to its dissolution part of the Liverpool Exchange Parliamentary constituency.

=== 1980 boundaries ===
The ward boundary was changed for the 1980 elections. A report of the Local Government Boundary Commission for England published in November 1978 set out proposals for changes to the wards of Liverpool City Council, maintaining the number of councillors at 99 representing 33 wards. Abercromby ward was represented by three councillors.

The report describes the boundaries of Tuebrook ward as "Commencing at a point where the western boundary of the City meets the southern boundary of Everton Ward, thence northeastwards along said ward boundary to Russell Street, thence southwards along said street to Brownlow Hill, thence eastwards along said hill to Crown Street, thence southeastwards along said street and in prolongation thereof to Upper Parliament Street, thence westwards along said street to Windsor Street, thence southeastwards along said street to Northumberland Street, thence southwestwards along said street and in prolongation thereof to the western boundary of the City, thence northwestwards along said boundary to the point of commencement".

From 1980 to 1983 the ward was part of the Liverpool Exchange Parliamentary constituency, and from 1983 to its dissolution was part of the Liverpool Riverside Parliamentary constituency.

=== 2004 elections ===
A report of the Local Government Boundary Commission published in March 2003 recommended the number of wards in the city be reduced to 30 and the number of councillors reduced to 90. The Abercromby ward was dissolved and distributed into the new Riverside and Princes Park wards.

== Councillors ==
Election	Councillor	Councillor	Councillor
1835	Thomas Brocklebank (Ref)	James Carson (Ref)	William Earle (Ref)
1836	Thomas Brocklebank (Whig)	James Carson (Whig)	William Earle (Whig)
1837	Thomas Brocklebank (Whig)	James Carson (Whig)	William Earle (Whig)
1838	Thomas Brocklebank (Whig)	James Carson (Whig)	Robertson Gladstone (Con)
1839	Christopher Bushell (Con)	James Carson (Whig)	Robertson Gladstone (Con)
(1840-1952)
1953	L Murphy (Lab)	Thomas Maguire (Lab)	Harry Livermore (Lab)
1953	L Murphy (Lab)	Kenneth Walter Consell (Lab)	Harry Livermore (Lab)
1954	L Murphy (Lab)	Kenneth Walter Consell (Lab)	Harry Livermore (Lab)
1955	L Murphy (Lab)	P Maguire (Lab)	Harry Livermore (Lab)
1956	L Murphy (Lab)	P Maguire (Lab)	Paul Orr (Lab)
1957	C Morris (Lab)	P Maguire (Lab)	Paul Orr (Lab)
1958	C Morris (Lab)	P Maguire (Lab)	Paul Orr (Lab)
1959	C Morris (Lab)	P Maguire (Lab)	Paul Orr (Lab)
1960	R.W. Rollins (Con)	P Maguire (Lab)	Paul Orr (Lab)
1961	R.W. Rollins (Con)	John E McPherson (Lab)	Paul Orr (Lab)
1962	R.W. Rollins (Con)	John E McPherson (Lab)	Harry Livermore (Lab)
1963	L Caplan (Lab)	John E McPherson (Lab)	Harry Livermore (Lab)
1964	L Caplan (Lab)	John E McPherson (Lab)	Harry Livermore (Lab)
1965	L Caplan (Lab)	John E McPherson (Lab)	Frank Gaier (Lab)
1966	William Burke (Lab)	John E McPherson (Lab)	Frank Gaier (Lab)
1967	William Burke (Lab)	John E McPherson (Lab)	Frank Gaier (Lab)
1968	William Burke (Lab)	John E McPherson (Lab)	David Daniel (Con)
1969	William Burke (Lab)	John E McPherson (Lab)	David Daniel (Con)
1970	William Burke (Lab)	John E McPherson (Lab)	David Daniel (Con)
1971	William Burke (Lab)	John E McPherson (Lab)	SF Jacobs (Lab)
1972	William Burke (Lab)	John E McPherson (Lab)	SF Jacobs (Lab)
1973-1980 see Abercromby St. James
1980	David Vasmer (Lib)	Alan Troy (Lib)	Chris Davies (Lib)
1982	Tony Hood (Lab)	Alan Troy (Lib)	Chris Davies (Lib)
1983	Tony Hood (Lab)	Jimmy Rutledge (Lab)	Chris Davies (Lib)
1984	Tony Hood (Lab)	Jimmy Rutledge (Lab)	Joe Devaney (Lab)
1986	Tony Hood (Lab)	Jimmy Rutledge (Lab)	Joe Devaney (Lab)
1987	Keith Hackett (Lab)	Alan Dean (Lab)	K. Feintuck (Lab)
1988	Keith Hackett (Lab)	Alan Dean (Lab)	K. Feintuck (Lab)
1990	Keith Hackett (Lab)	Alan Dean (Lab)	Sarah Norman (Lab)
1991	Keith Hackett (Lab)	N Stanley (Lab)	Sarah Norman (Lab)
1992	Keith Hackett (Lab)	N Stanley (Lab)	Sarah Norman (Lab)
1994	J Hackett (Lab)	N Stanley (Lab)	Sarah Norman (Lab)
1995	S Watson (Lab)	A Cleary (Lab)	Sarah Norman (Lab)
1996	S Watson (Lab)	A Cleary (Lab)	Sarah Norman (Lab)
1998	Joe Anderson (Lab)	A Cleary (Lab)	Steve Munby (Lab)
1999	Joe Anderson (Lab)	Paul Brant (Lab)	Steve Munby (Lab)
2000	Joe Anderson (Lab)	Paul Brant (Lab)	Steve Munby (Lab)
2002	Joe Anderson (Lab)	Paul Brant (Lab)	Steve Munby (Lab)
2003	Joe Anderson (Lab)	Paul Brant (Lab)	Steve Munby (Lab)

indicates seat up for re-election after boundary changes.

indicates seat up for re-election.

indicates change in affiliation.

indicates seat up for re-election after casual vacancy.

== Election results ==
=== Elections of the 2000s ===
1 May 2003
Party	Candidate	Votes	%	±%
Labour	Paul Brant	953	61.29	▼4.53
Liberal Democrats	Linda-Jane Buckle	288	18.52	▲3.27
Green	Peter Cranie	230	14.79	▲3.94
Conservative	John Creagh	55	3.54	▼1.26
Liberal	Arthur Carroll	29	1.86	▼1.42
Majority		665	42.77	▼7.79
Turnout		1,555	14.11	▲0.13
Registered electors		11,020		
Labour hold		Swing	-3.90	

2 May 2002
Party	Candidate	Votes	%	±%
Labour	Joe Anderson	1,001	65.81	▼0.45
Liberal Democrats	Daniel Clein	232	15.25	▼2.05
Green	Peter Cranie	165	10.85	▲4.47
Conservative	Diane Watson	73	4.80	▲0.87
Liberal	Arthur Carroll	50	3.29	▼2.83%
Majority		769	50.56	▲1.61
Turnout		1,521	13.98	▲2.84
Registered electors		10,876		
Labour hold		Swing	+0.80	

4 May 2000
Party	Candidate	Votes	%	±%
Labour	Steve Munby	758	66.26	▲8.77
Liberal Democrats	Jeremy Wright	198	17.31	▼15.46
Green	R. Barratt	73	6.38	▼0.49
Liberal	J. Richardson	70	6.12	N/A
Conservative	G.A. Watson	45	3.93	▲1.06
Majority		560	48.95	▲24.23
Turnout		1,074	11.15	▼4.67
Registered electors		10,263		
Labour hold		Swing	+12.11	

=== Elections of the 1990s ===
6 May 1999
Party	Candidate	Votes	%	±%
Labour	Paul Brant	879	57.49	▼1.85
Liberal Democrats	Josie Mullen	501	32.77	▲3.50
Green	Jennifer Mary. Brown	105	6.87	N/A
Conservative	Diane Isabel Watson	44	2.88	▼1.36
Majority		378	24.72	▼5.35
Turnout		1,529	15.81	▲5.29
Registered electors		9,669		
Labour hold		Swing	-2.67	

7 May 1998 (2 seats)
Party	Candidate	Votes	%	±%
Labour	Joe Anderson	588	59.33	▼13.50
Labour	Steve Munby	547	55.20	−
Liberal Democrats	C. Barnett	290	29.26	▲21.60
Liberal Democrats	J.Cowan	244	24.62	−
Liberal	M. Wingfield	71	7.16	▲0.44
Conservative	C.P.S. Biller	42	4.24	▼1.81
Conservative	C.S. Harley	41	4.14	−
Majority		298	30.07	▼35.09
Turnout		991	10.52	▼7.43
Registered electors		9,419		
Labour hold		Swing	-17.55	
Labour hold		Swing		

2 May 1996
Party	Candidate	Votes	%	±%
Labour	Sarah Norman	1,083	72.83	▼1.93
Liberal Democrats	Kevin Firth	114	7.67	▼0.37
Liberal	A. Carroll	100	6.72	▲2.41
Green	R. Spalding	100	6.72	▼1.00
Conservative	C. Zsigmond	90	6.05	▲0.89
Majority		969	65.16	▼1.56
Turnout		1,487	17.95	▼5.03
Registered electors		8,285		
Labour hold		Swing	-0.78	

4 May 1995 (2 seats)
Party	Candidate	Votes	%	±%
Labour	A. Cleary	1,404	74.76	▲1.17
Labour	S. Watson	1,265	67.36	−
Liberal Democrats	Nigel Dyer	151	8.04	▼3.90
Green	R. Spalding	145	7.72	▲1.72
Liberal Democrats	John Clucas	141	7.54	−
Conservative	P. Edwards	97	5.17	▲0.40
Liberal	J. Mayes	81	4.31	▲0.62
Majority		1,253	66.72	▲5.07
Turnout		1,878	22.98	▼0.91
Registered electors		8,172		
Labour hold		Swing	+2.54	
Labour hold		Swing		

5 May 1994
Party	Candidate	Votes	%	±%
Labour	J. Hackett	1,374	73.59	▲2.73
Liberal Democrats	Nigel Dyer	223	11.94	▲0.72
Green	Jennifer Brown	112	6.00	▼1.68
Conservative	P. Edwards	89	4.77	▼5.47
Liberal	J. Highcock	69	4.77	N/A
Majority		1,151	61.65	▲2.00
Turnout		1,867	23.89	▲3.25
Registered electors		7,815		
Labour hold		Swing	+1.00	

7 May 1992
Party	Candidate	Votes	%	±%
Labour	Sarah Norman	1,080	70.87	▼6.60
Liberal Democrats	Nigel Dyer	171	11.22	▼3.45
Conservative	A. Zsigmond	156	10.24	▲2.37
Green	S. Mansfield	117	7.68	N/A
Majority		909	59.65	▼3.15
Turnout		1,524	20.64	▼7.43
Registered electors		7,385		
Labour hold		Swing	-1.57	

2 May 1991
Party	Candidate	Votes	%	±%
Labour	N. Stanley	1,526	77.46	▲4.15
Liberal Democrats	Nigel Dyer	289	14.67	▲8.77
Conservative	C. Zsigmond	155	7.87	▲2.70
Majority		1,237	62.79	▲0.75
Turnout		1,970	28.07	▼15.10
Registered electors		7,018		
Labour hold		Swing	-2.31	

3 May 1990 (2 seats)
Party	Candidate	Votes	%	±%
Labour	Keith Hackett	1,802	73.31	▼7.39
Labour	Sarah Norman	1,745	70.99	−
Green	Laura Davenport	277	11.27	N/A
Liberal Democrats	Jeremy Chowings	145	5.90	▼1.35
Liberal Democrats	Nigel Dyer	134	5.45	−
Conservative	Pauline Edwards	127	5.90	▼1.85
Conservative	D. Radcliffe	114	4.64	−
Communist	F. Carroll	107	4.35	▼0.68
Majority		1,525	62.04	▼11.41
Turnout		2,458	43.17	▲5.34
Registered electors		5,694		
Labour hold		Swing	-	

=== Elections of the 1980s ===
5 May 1988
Party	Candidate	Votes	%	±%
Labour	K. Feintuck	2,070	80.70	▲11.57
SLD	Carole Matthews	186	7.25	▼11.38
Conservative	P. Lee	180	7.02	▲1.73
Communist	P. Carroll	129	5.03	▼1.91
Majority		1,884	73.45	▲22.95
Turnout		1,884	73.45	▼4.92
Registered electors		6,780		
Labour hold		Swing	+11.47	

7 May 1987 - 3 seats (Note: Tony Hood, Jimmy Rutledge and Joe Devaney were surcharged and banned from office following the Rate-capping rebellion. Three seats were contested at the 1987 election.)
Party	Candidate	Votes	%	±%
Labour	Alan W. Dean	2,260	79.13	▼0.93
Labour	Keith Hackett	2,225	68.06	−
Labour	K. Feintuck	2,221	67.94	−
Liberal	Annette Butler	609	18.63	▲1.47
Liberal	W. M. Bullock	545	16.67	−
Liberal	K. D. Kelbrick	545	17	−
Communist	F. Carroll	227	6.94	▲3.09
Conservative	G. A. Earle	173	5.29	▼0.14
Conservative	E. B. Steadman	138	4.22	−
Conservative	G. A. H. Tann	130	3.98	−
Majority		1,651	50.50	▼2.39
Turnout		3,269	42.75	▲9.02
Registered electors		7,646		
Labour hold		Swing	-1.20	

1 May 1986
Party	Candidate	Votes	%	±%
Labour	Antony Hood	1,947	70.06	▼9.72
Alliance	B. Aston	477	17.16	▲6.97
Conservative	H. V. Tracey Forster	151	5.43	▼1.91
Communist	F. Carroll	107	3.85	▲1.17
Green	N. Everard	97	3.49	N/A
Majority		1,470	52.90	▼16.69
Turnout		2,779	33.73	▼4.58
Registered electors		8,239		
Labour hold		Swing	-8.35	

1 May 1984
Party	Candidate	Votes	%	±%
Labour	Joe Devaney	2,739	89.78	▲6.13
Liberal	C. J. Leahy	350	10.20	▼3.40
Conservative	H. V. Tracy-Forster	252	7.34	▼1.34
Communist	F. Carroll	92	2.68	▼1.39
Majority		2,389	69.59	▲9.53
Turnout		3,433	38.31	▲9.19
Registered electors		8,960		
Labour gain from Liberal		Swing	+4.77	

5 May 1983
Party	Candidate	Votes	%	±%
Labour	J. Rutledge	2,010	73.65	▲19.59
Liberal	C. J. Leahy	371	13.59	▼24.00
Conservative	H. V. Tracy-Forster	237	8.68	▲5.40
Communist	F. Carroll	111	4.07	▼0.99
Majority		1,639	60.06	▲43.59
Turnout		2,729	29.12	▼2.11
Registered electors		9,370		
Labour gain from Liberal		Swing	+21.79	

6 May 1982
Party	Candidate	Votes	%	±%
Labour	Antony Hood	1,648	54.07	▲19.57
Liberal	David Vasmer	1,146	37.60	▼16.21
Communist	Roger O'Hara	154	5.05	▼3.15
Conservative	G. A. Powell	100	3.28	▼0.20
Majority		502	16.47	▼2.84
Turnout		3,048	31.24	▼3.62
Registered electors		9,757		
Labour gain from Liberal		Swing	+17.89	

6 May 1980 (3 seats)
Party	Candidate	Votes	%	±%
Liberal	Chris Davies	2,040	53.8	
Liberal	Alan Troy	1,696		
Liberal	David Vasmer	1,692		
Labour	Owen Joseph Doyle	1,308	34.5	
Labour	Edward Shields	1,301		
Labour	Violet McCoy	1,292		
Communist	Roger O'Hara	311	8.2	
Conservative	Ian McFall	132	3.5	
Conservative	Eric Wardle Mossford	116		
Conservative	Ernest Peat	107		
Majority		732		
Turnout			36.3	
Registered electors		10,455		
Liberal win (new seat)				
Liberal win (new seat)				
Liberal win (new seat)				

For elections between 1973 and 1979 see Abercromby St James

=== Elections of the 1970s ===
==== 1972 ====
3 May 1972
Party	Candidate	Votes	%	±%
Labour	William F Burke	871	78.75%	▲11.44
Conservative	LW Mossford	139	12.57%	▼6.04
Communist	Anthony McLelland	96	8.68%	▲3.17
Majority		732	66.18%	▲17.48
Turnout		1,106	21.20%	▼6.93
Registered electors		5,218		
Labour hold		Swing	▲8.74	

==== 1971 ====
13 May 1971
Party	Candidate	Votes	%	±%
Labour	SF Jacobs	1,038	67.32%	▲0.97
Conservative	David E. Daniels	287	18.61%	▼3.78
Communist	Anthony McLelland	85	5.51%	▼5.76
Majority		751	48.70%	▲4.75
Turnout		1,542	28.12%	▲4.71
Registered electors		5,483		
Labour gain from Conservative		Swing	▲2.38	

==== 1970 ====
7 May 1970
Party	Candidate	Votes	%	±%
Labour	John E McPherson	883	66.34%	▲21.98
Conservative	A.W. Jones	298	22.39%	▼16.28
Communist	Anthony McLelland	150	11.27%	▼2.34
Majority		585	43.95%	▲38.27
Turnout		1,331	23.42%	▲2.52
Registered electors		5,684		
Labour hold		Swing	▲19.13	

=== Elections of the 1960s ===
==== 1969 ====
8 May 1969
Party	Candidate	Votes	%	±%
Labour	William F Burke	515	44.36%	▲0.27
Conservative	Stanley V Hennessy	449	38.67%	▼6.64
Communist	Anthony McLelland	158	13.61%	▲3.01
National Front	Elvyn Thompson	39	3.36%	N/A
Majority		66	5.68%	▲4.47
Turnout		1,161	20.89%	▲2.94
Registered electors		5,557		
Labour hold		Swing	▲3.45	

==== 1968 ====
9 May 1968
Party	Candidate	Votes	%	±%
Conservative	David E Daniel	483	45.31%	▲3.92
Labour	Frank Gaier	470	44.09%	▼3.61
Communist	Anthony McLelland	113	10.60%	▼0.31
Majority		13	1.22%	▼5.09
Turnout		1,066	27.95%	▼2.07
Registered electors		5,938		
Conservative gain from Labour		Swing	▲3.77	

==== 1967 ====
11 May 1967
Party	Candidate	Votes	%	±%
Labour	John E McPherson	695	47.70%	▼10.51
Conservative	Herbert C Norcott	603	41.39%	▲8.05
Communist	Anthony McLelland	159	10.91%	▲2.46
Majority		92	6.31%	▼18.56
Turnout		1,457	20.02%	▲2.38
Registered electors		7,276		
Labour hold		Swing	▼9.28	

==== 1966 ====
12 May 1966
Party	Candidate	Votes	%	±%
Labour	William F Burke	833	85.21%	▼0.17
Conservative	Herbert C Norcott	477	33.33%	▼3.23
Communist	Anthony McLelland	121	8.46%	▲3.40
Majority		356	24.88%	▲3.06
Turnout		1,431	17.65%	▼2.62
Registered electors		8,108		
Labour hold		Swing	▲1.53	

==== 1965 ====
13 May 1965
Party	Candidate	Votes	%	±%
Labour	Frank Gaier	1,017	58.38%	▼4.44
Conservative	C Hughes	637	36.57%	▲7.06
Communist	Anthony McLelland	88	5.05%	▼2.62
Majority		380	21.81%	▼11.50
Turnout		1,742	20.27%	▼2.74
Registered electors		8,596		
Labour hold		Swing	▼5.75	

==== 1964 ====
7 May 1964
Party	Candidate	Votes	%	±%
Labour	John E McPherson	1,318	62.82%	▼1.09
Conservative	G.W. Boult	619	29.50%	▼1.63
Communist	Anthony McLelland	161	7.67%	▲2.72
Majority		699	33.32%	▲0.54
Turnout		2,098	23.01%	▼6.97
Registered electors		9,118		
Labour hold		Swing	▲0.27	

==== 1963 ====
9 May 1963
Party	Candidate	Votes	%	±%
Labour	L Caplan	1,792	63.91%	▼2.15
Conservative	R.W. Rollins	873	31.13%	▲2.42
Communist	Anthony McLelland	139	4.96%	▼0.27
Majority		919	32.77%	▼4.57
Turnout		2,804	29.98%	▲3.64
Registered electors		9,353		
Labour gain from Conservative		Swing	▼2.29	

==== 1962 ====
10 May 1962
Party	Candidate	Votes	%	±%
Labour	Harry Livermore	1,707	66.06%	▲12.25
Conservative	L Huglin	742	28.72%	▼13.03
Communist	Anthony McLelland	135	5.22%	N/A
Majority		965	37.35%	▲25.28
Turnout		2,584	26.34%	▲1.27
Registered electors		9,810		
Labour hold		Swing	▲12.64	

==== 1961 ====
11 May 1961
Party	Candidate	Votes	%	±%
Labour	John E McPherson	1,356	53.81%	▲11.32
Conservative	G.W. Boult	1,052	41.75%	▼7.22
Union Movement	H Taylor	112	4.44%	▼0.28
Majority		304	12.07%	▲5.59
Turnout		2,520	25.07%	▲4.07
Registered electors		10,052		
Labour hold		Swing	▲9.27	

==== 1960 ====
12 May 1960
Party	Candidate	Votes	%	±%
Conservative	R.W. Rollins	1,089	48.97%	▲9.14
Labour	A Williams	945	42.49%	▼12.20
Union Movement	H Taylor	105	4.72%	N/A
Communist	Anthony McLelland	85	3.82%	▼1.66
Majority		144	6.47%	▼8.38
Turnout		2,224	21.00%	▼6.00
Registered electors		10,592		
Conservative gain from Labour		Swing	▲10.67	

=== Elections of the 1950s ===
==== 1959 ====
7 May 1959
Party	Candidate	Votes	%	±%
Labour	Paul Orr	1,616	54.69%	▲2.22
Conservative	A Lloyd	1,177	39.83%	▲6.77
Communist	Anthony McLelland	162	5.48%	▲1.24
Majority		439	14.86%	▼4.55
Turnout		2,955	27.00%	▼3.80
Registered electors		10,944		
Labour hold		Swing	▼2.28	

==== 1958 ====
8 May 1958
Party	Candidate	Votes	%	±%
Labour	P Maguire	1,795	52.47%	▲7.58
Conservative	A McVeigh	1,131	33.06%	▼4.25
Communist	Anthony McLelland	145	4.24%	▲0.40
Majority		664	19.41%	▲11.84
Turnout		3,421	30.80%	▼1.43
Registered electors		11,108		
Labour hold		Swing	▲5.92	

==== 1957 ====
9 May 1957
Party	Candidate	Votes	%	±%
Labour	C Morris	1,672	44.89%	▼9.35
Conservative	A McVeigh	1,390	37.32%	▼2.93
Independent Labour	L Murphy	520	13.96%	N/A
Communist	Anthony McLelland	143	3.84%	▼1.68
Majority		282	7.57%	▼6.42
Turnout		3,725	32.23%	▲0.79
Registered electors		11,557		
Labour hold		Swing	▼3.21	

==== 1956 ====
10 May 1956
Party	Candidate	Votes	%	±%
Labour	Paul Orr	2,023	54.24%	▲3.28
Conservative	J.H.W. Stewart	1,501	40.24%	▼3.03
Communist	Anthony McLelland	206	5.52%	▼0.25
Majority		522	13.99%	▲6.32
Turnout		3,730	31.44%	▼5.92
Registered electors		11,864		
Labour hold		Swing	▲3.16	

==== 1955 ====
12 May 1955
Party	Candidate	Votes	%	±%
Labour	P Maguire	2,330	50.95%	▼14.83
Conservative	J.H.W. Stewart	1,979	42.28%	▲9.06
Communist	Anthony McLelland	264	5.77%	N/A
Majority		351	7.68%	▼23.89
Turnout		4,573	37.36%	▲0.73
Registered electors		12,241		
Labour hold		Swing	▼11.95	

==== 1954 ====
13 May 1954
Party	Candidate	Votes	%	±%
Labour	L Murphy	3,057	65.78%	▲7.72
Conservative	H.M. Dobbie	1,590	34.22%	▼7.22
Majority		1,467	31.57%	▼26.99
Turnout		4,647	36.63%	▼7.24
Registered electors		12,687		
Labour hold		Swing	▲7.22	

==== 1953 ====
Cllr Thomas George Dominic Maguire died on 24 August 1953.

Abercromby By-election, 24 August 1953
Party	Candidate	Votes	%	±%
Labour	Kenneth Walter Consell	2,493	57.38%	
Conservative	Reginald John McLaughlin	1,852	42.62%	
Majority		641	14.76%	
Turnout		4,345	33.83%	
Registered electors		12,845		
Labour hold		Swing		

The 1953 Municipal elections followed boundary changes resulting in all seats being contested.

7 May 1953 (3 seats)
Party	Candidate	Votes	%	±%
Labour	Harry Livermore	3,300	58.56%	
Labour	Thomas George Dominic Maguire	3,130	55.55%	
Labour	L. Murphy	3,115	55.28%	
Conservative	John Cheshire	2,335	44.44%	
Conservative	Abram Maxwell Caplin	12,256	40.04%	
Conservative	Francis Joseph Bullen	2,231	39.59%	
Majority		965	17.13%	
Turnout		5,635	43.87%	
Registered electors		12,845		
Labour win (new seat)				
Labour win (new seat)				
Labour win (new seat)				

==== 1952 ====
8 May 1952
Party	Candidate	Votes	%	±%
Labour	Harry Livermore	3,564	62.28%	▲15.68
Conservative	John Kenneth Hart	2,159	37.72%	▼15.68
Majority		1,405	24.55%	▲17.75
Turnout		5,723	43.17%	▲5.13
Registered electors		13,256		
Labour gain from Conservative		Swing	▲15.68	

==== 1951 ====
11 May 1951
Party	Candidate	Votes	%	±%
Conservative	Francis Joseph Bullen	2,740	53.40%	▲0.87
Labour	William Smyth	2,391	46.60%	▼0.87
Majority		349	6.80%	▲1.73
Turnout		5,131	38.04%	▼1.54
Registered electors		13,488		
Conservative hold		Swing	▲0.87	

==== 1950 ====
11 May 1950
Party	Candidate	Votes	%	±%
Conservative	John Cheshire	2,747	52.53%	▼1.54
Labour	William Smyth	2,482	47.47%	▲5.38
Majority		265	5.07%	▼6.92
Turnout		5,229	39.58%	▲1.56
Registered electors		13,210		
Conservative hold		Swing	▼3.46	

=== Elections of the 1940s ===
==== 1949 ====
12 May 1949
Party	Candidate	Votes	%	±%
Conservative	John Kenneth Hart	2,954	54.07%	▲0.05
Labour	Francis Lavery	2,299	42.08%	▼3.89
Communist	Mrs Olwyn White	210	3.84%	N/A
Majority		655	11.99%	▲3.94
Turnout		5,463	38.03%	▼3.19
Registered electors		14,366		
Conservative gain from Labour		Swing	▼2.28	

==== 1947 ====
1 November 1947
Party	Candidate	Votes	%	±%
Conservative	Francis Joseph Bullen	3,160	54.03%	▲2.37
Labour	Harry Livermore	2,689	45.97%	▼2.37
Majority		471	8.05%	▲4.74
Turnout		5,849	41.22%	▲7.21
Registered electors		14,189		
Conservative gain from Labour		Swing		

==== 1946 ====
1 November 1946
Party	Candidate	Votes	%	±%
Conservative	John Reginald Bevins	2,435	51.65%	▲7.33
Labour	Richard Clitherow	2,279	48.35%	▼7.33
Majority		156	3.31%	▼8.05
Turnout		4,714	34.02%	▼0.96
Registered electors		13,858		

==== 1945 ====
1 November 1945
Party	Candidate	Votes	%	±%
Labour	Francis Lavery	2,466	55.68%	
Labour	Harry Livermore	2,439	55.07%	
Conservative	Joseph James E Sloan	1,963	44.32%	
Conservative	George Bowman	1,961	44.28%	
Majority		503	11.36%	
Turnout		4,429	34.98%	
Registered electors		12,663		

=== Elections of the 1830s ===
Friday 1 November 1839
Party	Candidate	Votes	%	±%
Conservative	Christopher Bushell	318	50.64	▼1.38
Whig	Henry Ripley	310	49.36	▲1.38
Majority		8	1.27	▼2.77
Turnout		628	83.18	▼2.64
Registered electors		755		
Conservative gain from Whig		Swing	1.38	

Thursday 1 November 1838
Party	Candidate	Votes	%	±%
Conservative	Robertson Gladstone	296	52.02	▲2.53
Whig	William Earle	273	47.98	▼2.53
Majority		23	4.04	▲3.03
Turnout		569	85.82	
Registered electors		663		
Conservative gain from Whig		Swing	+2.53	

Wednesday 1 November 1837
Party	Candidate	Votes	%	±%
Whig	Dr. James Carson	250	50.51	▼2.82
Conservative	Thomas Kaye	245	49.49	▲2.82
Majority		5	1.01	▼5.66
Turnout		495		
Registered electors				
Whig hold		Swing	-2.82	

Tuesday 1 November 1836
Party	Candidate	Votes	%	±%
Whig	Thomas Brocklebank	192	53.33	▼2.53
Conservative	Thomas Kaye	168	46.67	▲2.53
Majority		24	6.67	▼5.05
Turnout		360	63.38	▼25.90
Registered electors		568		
Whig hold		Swing	-2.53	

Saturday 26 December 1835 (Note: Following the establishment of the Liverpool Town Council under the provisions of the Municipal Corporations Act 1835 three members were elected.)
Party	Candidate	Votes	%	±%
Whig	William Earle Jr. (Note: William Earle Jr. was a member of the preceding Liverpool Common Council who sought election to the Liverpool Town Council.)	186	55.86	
Whig	Dr James Carson	184	55.26	
Whig	Thomas Brocklebank	172	51.65	
Conservative	Robertson Gladstone	147	44.14	
Conservative	Thomas Kaye	141	42.34	
Conservative	William Ripley	129	38.74	
Majority		39	11.72	
Turnout		333	89.28	
Registered electors		373		
Whig win (new seat)				
Whig win (new seat)				
Whig win (new seat)				

== See also ==
- Liverpool City Council
- Liverpool City Council elections 1880–present
- Liverpool Town Council elections 1835 - 1879
