= Exchange (Liverpool ward) =

Ward in Liverpool

The Exchange ward was a former electoral division of Liverpool, in the United Kingdom.

The Exchange ward was one of the oldest and most significant areas in Liverpool, named after the Liverpool Exchange, a notable financial and commercial hub in the city. The Liverpool Exchange building itself was central to the economic development of the city during the 18th and 19th centuries, serving as a focal point for trade and business, especially given Liverpool's prominence as a major port during the British Empire.

== Overview ==
Historically, wards in Liverpool were used as administrative districts for electing members to the City Council and for organizing various city services.

The Exchange ward was located in the heart of the city center, encompassing some of the most important civic and commercial buildings, including the Town Hall and the financial district around Castle Street, Water Street, and Old Hall Street. The ward was home to merchants, bankers, and other prominent business figures of the time.

The boundaries of Liverpool’s electoral wards have been redrawn multiple times over the years, reflecting changes in population and administrative needs. By the latter part of the 20th century, the Exchange ward was abolished or merged with surrounding areas as part of broader changes to Liverpool's ward structure. While the Exchange ward itself no longer exists in the modern electoral system, its legacy remains tied to Liverpool's economic history and its development as a major international trading city.

== Elections ==
=== 1835 ===
No. 5 Exchange - 3 seats
Party	Candidate	Votes	%	±%
Whig	James Holmes	179	56%	N/A
Whig	Lawrence Heyworth	167	53%	N/A
Whig	James Mellor	161	51%	N/A
Conservative	Thomas Sands	139	44%	N/A
Conservative	John Bent	126	40%	N/A
Conservative	G. B. Irlam	118	37%	N/A
Majority		40		N/A
Registered electors		468		
Turnout		318		N/A
Whig win (new seat)				
Whig win (new seat)				
Whig win (new seat)				

Polling places : Surnames A to K : at the south end of the Sessions'-house in South Chapel-street. Surnames L to Z : at the north end of the Sessions'-house in Chapel-street.

=== 1836 ===
No. 5 Exchange
Party	Candidate	Votes	%	±%
Whig	James Mellor *	173	50.1%	
Conservative	Thomas Sands	172	49.9%	
Majority		1	0.2%	
Registered electors		513		
Turnout		345	67%	
Whig hold		Swing		

=== 1837 ===
No. 5 Exchange
Party	Candidate	Votes	%	±%
Conservative	Thomas Sands	204	51%	
Whig	Lawrence Heyworth *	193	49%	
Majority		11	2%	N/A
Registered electors				
Turnout		397		
Conservative gain from Whig		Swing		

=== 1838 ===
No. 5 Exchange
Party	Candidate	Votes	%	±%
Whig	Henry Holmes	163	62%	
Conservative	George Gurden	101	38%	
Majority		62	24%	
Registered electors		549		
Turnout		264	48%	
Whig hold		Swing		

Time	Henry Holmes		George Gurden	
Time	Votes	%	Votes	%
10:00	35	70%	15	30%
11:00	69	69%	31	31%
12:00	91	62%	55	38%
13:00	120	63%	69	37%
14:00	138	64%	76	36%
15:00	154	62%	94	38%
16:00	163	62%	101	38%

=== 1839 ===
No. 5 Exchange
Party	Candidate	Votes	%	±%
Whig	James Mellor*	193	50.1%	
Conservative	Ambrose Lace	192	49.9%	
Majority		1	0.2%	
Registered electors		552		
Turnout		385	70%	
Whig hold		Swing		

=== 1919 ===
No. 5 Exchange
Party	Candidate	Votes	%	±%
Irish Nationalist	Peter Kavanagh	955	66%	
Conservative	Perring Thomas Stolterfoht *	486	34%	
Majority		469		
Registered electors		2,549		
Turnout		1,441	57%	
Irish Nationalist gain from Conservative		Swing		

=== 1920 ===
No. 5 Exchange
Party	Candidate	Votes	%	±%
Irish Nationalist	Henry Granby	907	52%	
Liberal	Frederick Charles Bowring *	829	48%	
Majority		78		
Registered electors		2,672		
Turnout		1,736	65%	
Irish Nationalist gain from Liberal		Swing		

=== 1921 ===
No. 5 Exchange
Party	Candidate	Votes	%	±%
Irish Nationalist	John Quinn	948	53%	
Liberal	Charles Sydney Jones *	840	47%	
Majority		108	6%	N/A
Registered electors		2,664		
Turnout		1,788	67%	
Irish Nationalist gain from Liberal		Swing		

=== 1922 ===
No. 5 Exchange
Party	Candidate	Votes	%	±%
Irish Nationalist	Peter Kavanagh *	unopposed		
Registered electors				
Irish Nationalist hold		Swing		

=== 1923 ===
No. 5 Exchange
Party	Candidate	Votes	%	±%
Irish Nationalist	Miss Alice McCormick	904	59%	
Liberal	Mark Philip Rathbone	575	37%	
Independent	Joseph Masterman	50	3%	
Unemployed	John Bingham	7	0.5%	
Majority		329		
Registered electors		2,747		
Turnout		1,536	56%	
Irish Nationalist hold		Swing		

=== 1924 ===
No. 5 Exchange
Party	Candidate	Votes	%	±%
Irish Nationalist	John Quinn *	unopposed		
Registered electors				
Irish Nationalist hold		Swing		

=== 1925 ===
No. 5 Exchange
Party	Candidate	Votes	%	±%
Catholic	Peter Kavanagh *	unopposed		
Registered electors		2,805		
Catholic gain from Irish Nationalist		Swing		

=== 1926 ===
No. 5 Exchange
Party	Candidate	Votes	%	±%
Catholic	Miss Alice McCormick *	709	77%	
Ex-Services	Albert Edward Price	214	23%	
Majority		495		
Registered electors		2,758		
Turnout		923	33%	
Catholic gain from Irish Nationalist		Swing		

=== 1927 ===
No. 5 Exchange
Party	Candidate	Votes	%	±%
Catholic	John Quinn *	910	85%	
Labour	Joseph Nugent	123	12%	
Majority		787		
Registered electors		2,710		
Turnout		1,033		
Catholic hold		Swing		

=== 1928 ===
No. 5 Exchange
Party	Candidate	Votes	%	±%
Catholic	Peter Kavanagh *	unopposed		
Registered electors				
Catholic hold		Swing		

=== 1929 ===
No. 5 Exchange
Party	Candidate	Votes	%	±%
Centre Party	Alice McCormick *	760	66%	
Labour	Margaret McFarlane	384	34%	
Majority		376		
Registered electors		2,697		
Turnout		1,144	42%	
Centre gain from Catholic				

=== 1930 ===
No. 5 Exchange
Party	Candidate	Votes	%	±%
Independent	James Farrell	unopposed		
Registered electors				
Independent gain from Catholic		Swing		

=== 1931 ===
No. 5 Exchange
Party	Candidate	Votes	%	±%
Independent	Peter Kavanagh *	1,228	91%	
Labour	Samuel Sydney Silverman	116	9%	
Majority		1,112		
Registered electors		2,492		
Turnout		1,344	54%	
Independent hold		Swing		

=== 1932 ===
No. 5 Exchange
Party	Candidate	Votes	%	±%
Centre	Miss Alice McCormick *	717	68%	
Labour	Albert Smitton	258	25%	
Youth	Arthur James Gerard Smyth	69	6.6%	
Ind. Labour Party	Mark Edward Boggin	7	0.67%	
Majority		459		
Registered electors				
Turnout		1,051		
Centre hold		Swing		

=== 1933 ===
No. 5 Exchange
Party	Candidate	Votes	%	±%
Independent	James Farrell	837	83%	
Labour	Albert Smitton	166	17%	
Majority		671		
Registered electors		2,404		
Turnout		1,003	42%	
Independent hold		Swing		

=== 1934 ===
No. 5 Exchange
Party	Candidate	Votes	%	±%
Independent	Peter Kavanagh *	unopposed		
Registered electors		2,383		
Independent hold		Swing		

=== 1935 ===
No. 5 Exchange
Party	Candidate	Votes	%	±%
Independent	Thomas Patrick Staunton *	757	63%	
Labour	Alfred Donohue	438	37%	
Majority		319		
Registered electors		2,351		
Turnout		1,195	51%	
Independent gain from Centre				

=== 1936 ===
No. 5 Exchange
Party	Candidate	Votes	%	±%
Independent	Thomas Patrick Staunton *	757	63%	
Labour	Alfred Donohue	438	37%	
Majority		319		
Registered electors		2,351		
Turnout		1,195	51%	
Independent gain from Centre				

=== 1937 ===
No. 5 Exchange
Party	Candidate	Votes	%	±%
Independent	Peter Kavanagh *	unopposed		
Registered electors				
Independent hold		Swing		

=== 1938 ===
No. 5 Exchange
Party	Candidate	Votes	%	±%
Independent	John Granby	765	72%	
Labour	John George Morgan	300	28%	
Majority		465		
Registered electors		2,122		
Turnout		1,065	50%	
Independent hold		Swing		

=== 1945 ===
Exchange - 2 seats
Party	Candidate	Votes	%	±%
Independent	Leo Henry Wright	728	74%	
Independent	Walter McGrath	721	73%	
Labour	Sarah Ann McArd	252	26%	
Labour	Herbert F. Granby	257	26%	
Majority		471		
Registered electors		1,619		
Turnout		985	61%	

=== 1946 ===
Exchange
Party	Candidate	Votes	%	±%
Independent	John Gerard Granby	648	73%	
Labour	Alfred Strange	228	26%	
Independent	Frederick Bowman	9	1%	
Majority		420		
Registered electors		1,589		
Turnout		885	56%	

=== 1947 ===
Exchange
Party	Candidate	Votes	%	±%
Independent	Walter McGrath	704	79%	
Labour	Francis Edward Campbell	188	21%	
Majority		516		
Registered electors		1,620		
Turnout		892	55%	
Independent hold		Swing		

=== 1949 ===
Exchange
Party	Candidate	Votes	%	±%
Independent	Leo Henry Wright *	795	81%	+7%
Labour	Joseph Mooney	190	19%	−7%
Majority		605		
Registered electors		1,625		
Turnout		985	61%	0%
Independent hold		Swing	+7%	

=== 1950 ===
Exchange
Party	Candidate	Votes	%	±%
Independent	John Gerard Granby	666	85%	+6%
Labour	Alexander Kay	121	15%	−6%
Majority		545		
Registered electors		1,575		
Turnout		787	50%	−5%
Independent hold		Swing	+6%	

=== 1951 ===
Exchange
Party	Candidate	Votes	%	±%
Independent	Walter McGrath *	646	74%	−5%
Labour	John Cullen	226	26%	+5%
Majority		420		
Registered electors		1,656		
Turnout		872	53%	−2%
Independent hold		Swing	-5%	

=== 1952 ===
Exchange
Party	Candidate	Votes	%	±%
Independent	John Larkin	598	62%	−19%
Labour	William McKeown	368	38%	+19%
Majority		230		
Registered electors		15,505		
Turnout		966	6%	
Independent hold		Swing		
