= St. Peter's (Liverpool ward) =

Ward in Liverpool

St. Peter’s
- Former Liverpool ward
- South
- Metropolitan borough: City of Liverpool
- Metropolitan county: Merseyside
- Region: North West
- Country: England
- Sovereign state: United Kingdom
- Post town: LIVERPOOL
- Postcode district: L1
- Dialling code: 0151
- Police: Merseyside
- Fire: Merseyside
- Ambulance: North West

St. Peter’s ward is a defunct Liverpool ward. Established in 1835 when Liverpool was first divided into wards under the Municipal Corporations Act 1835, it was abolished in 1953 as part of reordering of Liverpool's electoral wards. It elected three councillors to Liverpool City Council.

It was named after St. Peter’s Church, which stood in Church Street. The church was demolished in 1922. The ward was in the city centre area, covering part of what is now Central Liverpool around Church Street, Seel Street, Concert Square, and nearby districts, with St Peter’s Church and Church Street at the core of the shopping district.

== Overview ==
St Peter's was one of the original sixteen wards established under the Municipal Corporations Act 1835, each sending three councillors to the newly reformed Liverpool City Council. It took its name from the prominent St Peter’s Church on Church Street, Liverpool’s first post-Reformation parish church, built in 1700, consecrated on 29 June 1704, and designated a pro-cathedral upon the establishment of the Diocese in 1880.

The church was widely considered architecturally unattractive: its doorways were each in a different design. It featured an octagonal tower rising to 108 ft with a peal of eight to ten bells, an admired oak altar, stained-glass east window depicting St Peter, and a grand organ. St Peter’s hosted Liverpool’s first oratorio (Handel’s Messiah) and served as pro-cathedral until Liverpool Cathedral took over .

By 1919, services had ceased; the church was demolished by 1922 to widen Church Street and to free up land for retail development, most notably a Woolworths store, later part of Liverpool ONE. The site is now marked by a brass Maltese cross embedded in the pavement.

Politically, following its abolition in the 1953 boundary reorganisation, much of St Peter’s became part of newly created central wards such as Church Ward.

== History and Boundaries ==
- 1835: Created as one of the sixteen municipal wards; elected three councillors. It initially covered the area around Church Street and the city centre WikipediaPenkett.
- Late 19th century to early 20th century: Boundaries gradually evolved, sometimes reflecting divisions such as “St Peter’s plus Pitt Street,” with numbering shifting (e.g., No. 19, No. 16, No. 8 in different years based on census and reorganisation).
- 1953: Formal abolition alongside many other wards, replaced by new electoral divisions under the Local Government Act

== Elections ==
=== 1835 ===
No. 7 St. Peter's - 3 seats
Party	Candidate	Votes	%	±%
Whig	John Woollright	205	59%	N/A
Whig	William Rushton	200	57%	N/A
Whig	Richard Bright	190	54%	N/A
Conservative	Mr. Potter	145	41%	N/A
Conservative	Nathan Litherland	143	41%	N/A
Conservative	Thomas Tobin	142	41%	N/A
Majority		60		N/A
Registered electors		548		
Turnout		359	64%	N/A
Whig win (new seat)				
Whig win (new seat)				
Whig win (new seat)				

Polling place : At the two windows of the Horse and Jockey public-house fronting Seel-street

=== 1836 ===
No. 7 St. Peter's
Party	Candidate	Votes	%	±%
Whig	Richard Bright *	199	51%	
Conservative	Nathan Litherland	192	49%	
Majority		7	2%	
Registered electors		596		
Turnout		391	66%	
Whig hold		Swing	-3%	

=== 1837 ===
No. 7 St. Peter's
Party	Candidate	Votes	%	±%
Whig	John Priestly	192	53%	
Conservative	Henry R. Sandbach	168	47%	
Majority		24	6%	
Registered electors				
Turnout		360		
Whig hold		Swing		

=== 1838 ===
No. 7 St. Peter's
Party	Candidate	Votes	%	±%
Whig	John Woollright *	208	60%	
Conservative	Wilfred Troutbeck	137	40%	
Majority		71	20%	
Registered electors		607		
Turnout		345	57%	
Whig hold		Swing		

Time	John Woollright		Wilfred Troutbeck	
Time	Votes	%	Votes	%
10:00	34	60%	23	40%
11:00	74	59%	51	41%
12:00	106	59%	73	41%
13:00	130	58%	96	42%
14:00	146	57%	108	43%
15:00	170	58%	121	42%
16:00	208	60%	137	40%

=== 1839 ===
No. 7 St. Peter's
Party	Candidate	Votes	%	±%
Whig	Richard Bright *	Unopposed		
Registered electors		583		
Whig hold				

=== 1840 ===
No. 7 St. Peter's
Party	Candidate	Votes	%	±%
Whig	John Priestley *	156	53%	
Conservative	Ebenezer Rae	137	47%	
Majority		19	6%	
Registered electors				
Turnout		293		
Whig hold		Swing		

Time	John Priestley		Ebenezer Rae	
Time	Votes	%	Votes	%
10:00	41	47%	47	53%
11:00	70	49%	73	51%
12:00	97	53%	86	47%
13:00	108	53%	97	47%
14:00	127	53%	113	47%
15:00	146	55%	121	45%
16:00	156	53%	137	47%

=== 1841 ===
No. 7 St. Peter's
Party	Candidate	Votes	%	±%
Conservative	Ebenezer Rae	312	52%	
Whig	John Woollright *	287	48%	
Majority		25	4%	N/A
Registered electors		721		
Turnout		599	83%	
Conservative gain from Whig		Swing		

=== 1842 ===
No. 7 St. Peter's
Party	Candidate	Votes	%	±%
Conservative	Samuel Holme	252	65%	
Whig	Adam Cliff	137	35%	
Majority		115	30%	N/A
Registered electors		682		
Turnout		389	57%	
Conservative gain from Whig		Swing		

Time	Samuel Holme		Adam Cliff	
Time	Votes	%	Votes	%
10:00	64	70%	28	30%
11:00	108	67%	53	33%
12:00	145	63%	85	37%
13:00	173	63%	103	37%
14:00	195	63%	117	38%
15:00	214	63%	126	37%
16:00	252	65%	137	35%

=== 1843 ===
No. 7 St. Peter's
Party	Candidate	Votes	%	±%
Conservative	J. A. Tinne	264	53%	
Whig	Thomas Bolton	233	47%	
Majority		31	6%	N/A
Registered electors		701		
Turnout		497	71%	
Conservative gain from Whig		Swing		

Polling Place : The Horse and Jockey, in Seel-street.

=== 1844 ===
No. 7 St. Peter's
Party	Candidate	Votes	%	±%
Conservative	Robert Sellar Henderson	269	54%	
Whig	Thomas Bolton	230	46%	
Majority		39	12%	
Registered electors		716		
Turnout		499	70%	
Conservative hold		Swing		

=== 1845 ===
No. 7 St. Peter's
Party	Candidate	Votes	%	±%
Conservative	John Stewart	Unopposed	N/A	N/A
Registered electors				
Conservative hold				

=== 1846 ===
No. 7 St. Peter's
Party	Candidate	Votes	%	±%
Conservative	John Abraham Tinne *	3	100%	
Registered electors				
Conservative hold				

=== 1847 ===
No. 7 St. Peter's
Party	Candidate	Votes	%	±%
Conservative	Robert Sellar Henderson *	242	53%	
Whig	Daniel Bell	214	47%	
Majority		28	6%	
Registered electors		725		
Turnout		456	63%	
Conservative hold		Swing		

=== 1848 ===
No. 7 St. Peter's
Party	Candidate	Votes	%	±%
Conservative	John Ferguson	268	59%	
Conservative	John Stewart *	184	41%	
Majority		84	18%	N/A
Registered electors				
Turnout		452		
Conservative gain from Conservative		Swing		

Polling Place : The Public-house, sign of "The Horse and Jockey" in Seel-street'

John Ferguson, a determined pro-rater and chairman of the National Federation.

=== 1849 ===
No. 7 St. Peter's
Party	Candidate	Votes	%	±%
Whig	John Charles Fernihough	227	55%	
Conservative	Thomas Clarke	184	45%	
Majority		43	10%	N/A
Registered electors		730		
Turnout		411	56%	
Whig gain from Conservative		Swing		

John Charles Fernihough and Thomas Clarke were both opposed to the Rivington Pike water scheme.

=== 1850 ===
No. 7 St. Peter's
Party	Candidate	Votes	%	±%
Conservative	James Holme	282	53%	
Whig	William Henderson	248	47%	
Majority		34	6%	
Registered electors		784		
Turnout		530	68%	
Conservative hold		Swing		

=== 1851 ===
No. 7 St. Peter's
Party	Candidate	Votes	%	±%
Conservative	Harmood Banner	285	61%	
Whig	Thomas Clarke *	182	39%	
Majority		103	22%	N/A
Registered electors				
Turnout		467		
Conservative gain from Whig		Swing		

=== 1852 ===
No. 7 St. Peter's
Party	Candidate	Votes	%	±%
Whig	John Charles Fernihough *	Unopposed	N/A	N/A
Registered electors				
Whig hold				

=== 1853 ===
No. 7 St. Peter's
Party	Candidate	Votes	%	±%
Conservative	James Holme *	2	Unopposed	N/A
Registered electors				
Conservative hold				

=== 1854 ===
No. 7 St. Peter's
Party	Candidate	Votes	%	±%
Conservative	Harmood Banner *	247	52%	
Whig	A. H. Wylie	71	15%	
Majority		176		
Registered electors				
Turnout		475		
Conservative hold		Swing		

=== 1855 ===
No. 7 St. Peter's
Party	Candidate	Votes	%	±%
Conservative	John Charles Fernihough *	unopposed		
Registered electors				
Conservative hold		Swing		

=== 1856 ===
No. 7 St. Peter's
Party	Candidate	Votes	%	±%
Conservative	James Holme *	unopposed		
Registered electors				
Conservative hold		Swing		

=== 1857 ===
No. 7 St. Peter's
Party	Candidate	Votes	%	±%
Whig	Charles Tricks Bowring	322	52%	
Conservative	Harmood Banner *	301	48%	
Majority		21	4%	N/A
Registered electors				
Turnout		623		
Whig gain from Conservative		Swing		

=== 1858 ===
No. 7 St. Peter's
Party	Candidate	Votes	%	±%
Whig	David Rae	266	57%	
Whig	John Charles Fernihough *	198	43%	
Majority		68	14%	
Registered electors				
Turnout		464		
Whig gain from Whig		Swing		

Time	David Rae		John Charles Fernihough	
Time	Votes	%	Votes	%
10:00	60	55%	50	45%
11:00	111	55%	91	45%
12:00	166	54%	140	46%
13:00	199	55%	165	45%
14:00	226	56%	176	44%
15:00	252	58%	186	42%
16:00	269	58%	191	42%

Polling Place : The Public House, sign of "The Ring of Bells" in School Lane, occupied by Mr. John Bennion.

=== 1859 ===
No. 7 St. Peter's
Party	Candidate	Votes	%	±%
Liberal	Henry Christie Beloe	331	54%	
Conservative	James Holme *	283	46%	
Majority		48	8%	N/A
Registered electors		875		
Turnout		614	70%	
Liberal gain from Conservative		Swing		

Time	Henry Christie Beloe		James Holme	
Time	Votes	%	Votes	%
10:00	90	59%	63	41%
11:00	168	55%	135	45%
12:00	228	56%	174	44%
13:00	261	55%	216	45%
14:00	280	55%	226	45%
15:00	297	54%	251	46%
16:00	331	54%	283	46%

=== 1860 ===
No. 7 St. Peter's
Party	Candidate	Votes	%	±%
Conservative	Charles Tricks Bowring *	unopposed		
Registered electors				
Conservative hold		Swing		

=== 1861 ===
No. 7 St. Peter's
Party	Candidate	Votes	%	±%
Liberal	David Rae *	unopposed		
Registered electors				
Liberal hold		Swing		

=== 1862 ===
No. 7 St. Peter's
Party	Candidate	Votes	%	±%
Liberal	Henry Christie Beloe *	unopposed		
Registered electors				
Liberal hold		Swing		

=== 1863 ===
No. 7 St. Peter's
Party	Candidate	Votes	%	±%
Liberal	Charles Tricks Bowring *	unopposed		
Registered electors				
Liberal hold		Swing		

=== 1864 ===
No. 7 St. Peter's
Party	Candidate	Votes	%	±%
	David Rae *	unopposed		
Registered electors				
	gain from	Swing		

=== 1865 ===
No. 7 St. Peter's
Party	Candidate	Votes	%	±%
Liberal	Henry Christie Beloe *	unopposed		
Registered electors				
Liberal hold		Swing		

=== 1866 ===
No. 7 St. Peter's
Party	Candidate	Votes	%	±%
Liberal	Charles Tricks Bowring *	unopposed		
Registered electors				
Liberal hold		Swing		

=== 1867 ===
No. 7 St. Peter's
Party	Candidate	Votes	%	±%
Liberal	Jacob Gaitskell Brown	337	51%	
Conservative	Major Richard Fell Steble	327	49%	
Majority		10	2%	N/A
Registered electors				
Turnout		664		
Liberal gain from Conservative		Swing		

=== 1868 ===
No. 7 St. Peter's
Party	Candidate	Votes	%	±%
Liberal	Henry Christie Beloe	unopposed		
Registered electors				
Liberal gain from		Swing		

=== 1869 ===
No. 7 St. Peter's
Party	Candidate	Votes	%	±%
Liberal	Charles Tricks Bowring *	449	69%	
Conservative	Reginald Young	202	31%	
Majority		247	38%	
Registered electors				
Turnout		651		
Liberal hold		Swing		

=== 1870 ===
No. 7 St. Peter's
Party	Candidate	Votes	%	±%
Liberal	Francis George Prange	2		
Conservative	Francis George Harbord	0		
Majority		2		
Registered electors				
Turnout		2		
Liberal hold		Swing		

=== 1871 ===
No. 7 St. Peter's
Party	Candidate	Votes	%	±%
Liberal	Henry Christie Beloe *	unopposed		
Registered electors				
Liberal hold		Swing		

=== 1872 ===
No. 7 St. Peter's
Party	Candidate	Votes	%	±%
Liberal	Charles Tricks Bowring *	466	70%	
Conservative	William George Bradley	196	30%	
Majority		270	40%	
Registered electors		1,595		
Turnout		662	42%	
Liberal hold		Swing		

=== 1873 ===
No. 7 St. Peter's
Party	Candidate	Votes	%	±%
Liberal	Alexander Balfour	576	52%	
Conservative	Edward Lewis Wigan	537	48%	
Majority		39		
Registered electors		1,753		
Turnout		1,113	63%	
gain from Liberal		Swing		

=== 1874 ===
No. 7 St. Peter's
Party	Candidate	Votes	%	±%
Liberal	Henry Christie Beloe *	unopposed		
Registered electors				
Liberal hold		Swing		

=== 1875 ===
No. 7 St. Peter's
Party	Candidate	Votes	%	±%
Liberal	Charles. Tricks Bowring *	Unopposed	N/A	N/A
Registered electors				
Liberal hold				

=== 1876 ===
No. 7 St. Peter's
Party	Candidate	Votes	%	±%
Liberal	Alexander Balfour *	603	56%	
Conservative	Edward Lewis Wigan	468	44%	
Majority		135	12%	
Registered electors		1,467		
Turnout		1,071	73%	
Liberal hold		Swing		

=== 1877 ===
No. 7 St. Peter's
Party	Candidate	Votes	%	±%
Liberal	Edmund Knowles Muspratt	unopposed		
Registered electors				
Liberal hold		Swing		

=== 1878 ===
No. 7 St. Peter's
Party	Candidate	Votes	%	±%
Liberal	Charles Tricks Bowring *	unopposed		
Registered electors		1,494		
Liberal hold		Swing		

=== 1879 ===
No. 7 St. Peter's
Party	Candidate	Votes	%	±%
Liberal	Alexander Balfour *	590	53%	
Conservative	John Hughes	531	47%	
Majority		59	6%	
Registered electors		1,602		
Turnout		1,121	70%	
Liberal hold		Swing		

=== 1880 ===
No. 7 St. Peter's
Party	Candidate	Votes	%	±%
Liberal	Edmund Knowles Muspratt *	667	54%	
Conservative	Joseph Boumphrey	560	46%	
Majority		107	8%	
Registered electors		1,632		
Turnout		1,227	75%	
Liberal hold		Swing		

=== 1881 ===
No. 7 St. Peter's
Party	Candidate	Votes	%	±%
Liberal	Charles Tricks Bowring *	unopposed		
Registered electors				
Liberal hold		Swing		

=== 1882 ===
No. 7 St. Peter's
Party	Candidate	Votes	%	±%
Liberal	John Stevenson	unopposed		
Registered electors				
Liberal hold		Swing		

=== 1883 ===
No. 7 St. Peter's
Party	Candidate	Votes	%	±%
Liberal	Edmund Knowles Muspratt *	Unopposed	N/A	N/A
Registered electors		1,481		
Liberal hold				

=== 1884 ===
No. 7 St. Peter's
Party	Candidate	Votes	%	±%
Liberal	William Benjamin Bowring	515	52%	
Conservative	Arthur Hill Holme	484	48%	
Majority		31	4%	
Registered electors		1,467		
Turnout		999	68%	
Liberal hold		Swing		

=== 1885 ===
No. 7 St. Peter's
Party	Candidate	Votes	%	±%
Conservative	Arthur Hill Holme	566	50%	
Liberal	John Stevenson *	560	50%	
Majority		6	0%	N/A
Registered electors		1,489		
Turnout		1,126	76%	
Conservative gain from Liberal		Swing		

=== 1886 ===
No. 7 St. Peter's
Party	Candidate	Votes	%	±%
Conservative	Isaac Morris	558	50%	
Liberal	Edmund Knowles Muspratt *	555	50%	
Majority		3	0%	N/A
Registered electors		1,523		
Turnout		1,113	73%	
Conservative gain from Liberal		Swing		

=== 1887 ===
No. 7 St. Peter's
Party	Candidate	Votes	%	±%
Liberal	William Benjamin Bowring *	Unopposed	N/A	N/A
Registered electors				
Liberal hold				

=== 1888 ===
No. 7 St. Peter's
Party	Candidate	Votes	%	±%
Conservative	Arthur Hill Holme *	unopposed		
Registered electors				
Conservative hold		Swing		

=== 1889 ===
No. 7 St. Peter's
Party	Candidate	Votes	%	±%
Liberal	William Henry Watts	609	54%	
Conservative	Isaac Morris *	515	45%	
Majority		94		N/A
Registered electors		1,479		
Turnout		1,124	76%	
Liberal gain from Conservative		Swing		

=== 1890 ===
No. 7 St. Peter's
Party	Candidate	Votes	%	±%
Liberal	William Benjamin Bowring *	Unopposed	N/A	N/A
Registered electors				
Liberal hold				

=== 1891 ===
No. 7 St. Peter's
Party	Candidate	Votes	%	±%
Liberal	George Grierson	521	51%	
Conservative	Arthur Hill Holme	499	49%	
Majority		22	2%	
Registered electors				
Turnout		1,020		
Liberal hold		Swing		

=== 1892 ===
No. 7 St. Peter's
Party	Candidate	Votes	%	±%
Liberal	William Henry Watts *	549	51%	
Conservative	Arthur Hill Holme	524	49%	
Majority		25	2%	
Registered electors				
Turnout		1,073		
Liberal hold		Swing		

=== 1893 ===
No. 7 St. Peter's
Party	Candidate	Votes	%	±%
Liberal	Samuel Hough	515	52%	
Conservative	John Wannop	480	48%	
Majority		35	4%	
Registered electors		1,430		
Turnout		995	70%	
Liberal hold		Swing		

=== 1894 ===
No. 7 St. Peter's
Party	Candidate	Votes	%	±%
Liberal	George Grierson *	unopposed		
Registered electors				
Liberal hold		Swing		

=== 1895 ===
Parish ward. Formerly St. Peters plus Pitt Street wards.

No. 19 St. Peter's - 3 seats
Party	Candidate	Votes	%	±%
Conservative	Charles George Dean	756	48%	N/A
Liberal	William Henry Watts	692	44%	N/A
Liberal	Samuel Hough	659	42%	N/A
Liberal	Thomas Donnelly	591	37%	N/A
Independent Irish Nationalist	Bernard McBennett	131	8%	N/A
Majority				N/A
Registered electors		2,082		
Turnout				N/A
Conservative win (new seat)				
Liberal win (new seat)				
Liberal win (new seat)				

=== 1896 ===
No. 19 St. Peter's
Party	Candidate	Votes	%	±%
Liberal	Samuel Hough *	unopposed		
Registered electors				
Liberal hold		Swing		

=== 1897 ===
No. 19 St. Peter's
Party	Candidate	Votes	%	±%
Liberal	William Henry Watts *	416	92%	
Independent	Alfred Allsop	35	7.8%	
Majority		381		
Registered electors		2,078		
Turnout		451	22%	
Liberal hold		Swing		

=== 1898 ===
No. 19 St. Peter's
Party	Candidate	Votes	%	±%
Liberal	Henry Miles	unopposed		
Registered electors				
Liberal gain from Conservative		Swing		

=== 1899 ===
No. 19 St. Peter's
Party	Candidate	Votes	%	±%
Liberal	Samuel Hough *	unopposed		
Registered electors				
Liberal hold		Swing		

=== 1900 ===
No. 19 St. Peter's
Party	Candidate	Votes	%	±%
Liberal	William Crossfield *	unopposed		
Registered electors				
Liberal hold		Swing		

=== 1901 ===
No. 19 St. Peter's
Party	Candidate	Votes	%	±%
Liberal	Henry Miles *	647	62%	
Liberal Unionist	William Harold Stowe Oulton	394	38%	
Majority		253		
Registered electors		1,924		
Turnout		1,041	54%	
Liberal gain from Conservative		Swing		

=== 1902 ===
No. 19 St. Peter's
Party	Candidate	Votes	%	±%
Liberal	Alexander Armour	371	95%	
Independent	John Grimes	19	5%	
Majority		352		
Registered electors				
Turnout		390		
Liberal hold		Swing		

=== 1903 ===
No. 19 St. Peter's
Party	Candidate	Votes	%	±%
Liberal	William Crossfield *	unopposed		
Registered electors				
Liberal hold		Swing		

=== 1904 ===
No. 19 St. Peter's
Party	Candidate	Votes	%	±%
Liberal	Henry Miles *	629	70%	
Labour	Walter Russell	269	30%	
Majority		360		
Registered electors		1,806		
Turnout		898	50%	
Liberal hold		Swing		

=== 1905 ===
No. 19 St. Peter's
Party	Candidate	Votes	%	±%
Liberal	Alexander Armour *	unopposed		
Registered electors				
Liberal hold		Swing		

=== 1906 ===
No. 19 St. Peter's
Party	Candidate	Votes	%	±%
Conservative	George Fewkes Clarke	629	59%	
Liberal	William Cossfield *	430	41%	
Majority		199		
Registered electors		1,809		
Turnout		1,059	59%	
Conservative gain from Liberal		Swing		

=== 1907 ===
No. 19 St. Peter's
Party	Candidate	Votes	%	±%
Liberal	Henry Miles *	unopposed		
Registered electors				
Liberal hold		Swing		

=== 1908 ===
No. 19 St. Peter's
Party	Candidate	Votes	%	±%
Liberal	Burton William Ellis *	617	54%	
Conservative	Henry Lyons	516	46%	
Majority		101		
Registered electors		1,744		
Turnout		1,133	65%	
Liberal hold		Swing		

=== 1909 ===
No. 19 St. Peter's
Party	Candidate	Votes	%	±%
Liberal	Thomas Shaw	562	55%	
Conservative	Hugh Toner	456	45%	
Majority		106		
Registered electors		1,715		
Turnout		1,018	59%	
Liberal gain from Conservative		Swing		

=== 1910 ===
No. 19 St. Peter's
Party	Candidate	Votes	%	±%
Liberal	John Byrne	unopposed		
Registered electors				
Liberal hold		Swing		

=== 1911 ===
No. 19 St. Peter's
Party	Candidate	Votes	%	±%
Liberal	Burton William Ellis *	unopposed		
Registered electors				
Liberal hold		Swing		

=== 1912 ===
No. 19 St. Peter's
Party	Candidate	Votes	%	±%
Conservative	Henry Alexander Cole	596	53%	
Liberal	Thomas Shaw *	533	47%	
Majority		63		
Registered electors		1,605		
Turnout		1,129	70%	
Conservative hold		Swing		

=== 1913 ===
No. 16 St. Peter's
Party	Candidate	Votes	%	±%
Liberal	Lawrence Durning Holt	655	59%	
Conservative	James Caughey Walker	454	41%	
Majority		201		
Registered electors		1,591		
Turnout		1,109	70%	
Liberal hold		Swing		

=== 1914 ===
No. 19 St. Peter's
Party	Candidate	Votes	%	±%
Liberal	Burton William Ellis *	unopposed		
Registered electors				
Liberal hold		Swing		

=== 1919 ===
No. 8 St. Peter's
Party	Candidate	Votes	%	±%
Conservative	Henry Alexander Cole *	743	62%	
Labour	Edward Fergus	451	38%	
Majority		292		
Registered electors		2,549		
Turnout		1,194	47%	
Conservative hold		Swing		

=== 1920 ===
No. 8 St. Peter's
Party	Candidate	Votes	%	±%
Liberal	Lawrence Durning Holt *	991	91%	
Irish Nationalist	James Friery	101	9%	
Majority		890		
Registered electors		2,607		
Turnout		1,092	42%	
Liberal hold		Swing		

=== 1921 ===
No. 8 St. Peter's
Party	Candidate	Votes	%	±%
Liberal	Burton William Eills	unopposed		
Registered electors				
Liberal hold		Swing		

=== 1922 ===
No. 8 St. Peter's
Party	Candidate	Votes	%	±%
Conservative	Henry Alexander Cole *	732	65%	
Independent	Frederick Bowman	402	35%	
Majority		330		
Registered electors		2,564		
Turnout		1,134	44%	
Conservative hold		Swing		

=== 1923 ===
No. 8 St. Peter's
Party	Candidate	Votes	%	±%
Liberal	Lawrence Durning Holt *	946	65%	
Independent	Frederick Bowman	333	23%	
Irish Nationalist	Owen Geraghty	155	11%	
Unemployed	Isaac Edward Ashton	16	1.1%	
Majority		613		
Registered electors		2,729		
Turnout		1,450	53%	
Liberal hold		Swing		

=== 1924 ===
No. 8 St. Peter's
Party	Candidate	Votes	%	±%
Liberal	Burton William Eills *	846	68%	
Independent	Frederick H. U. Bowman	399	32%	
Majority		447		
Registered electors		2,892		
Turnout		1,245	43%	
Liberal hold		Swing		

=== 1925 ===
No. 8 St. Peter's
Party	Candidate	Votes	%	±%
Conservative	Herbert Wolfe Levy *	766	57%	
Labour	John Loughlin	369	27%	
Independent	Frederick Bowman	207	15%	
Majority		397		
Registered electors		2,947		
Turnout		1,342	46%	
Conservative hold		Swing		

=== 1926 ===
No. 8 St. Peter's
Party	Candidate	Votes	%	±%
Liberal	Lawrence Durning Holt *	unopposed		
Registered electors		2,931		
Liberal hold		Swing		

=== 1927 ===
No. 8 St. Peter's
Party	Candidate	Votes	%	±%
Liberal	Burton William Eills *	806	80%	
Independent	Frederick Bowman	198	20%	
Majority		608		
Registered electors		2,885		
Turnout		1,004	35%	
Liberal hold		Swing		

=== 1928 ===
No. 8 St. Peter's
Party	Candidate	Votes	%	±%
Conservative	Herbert Wolfe Levy *	631	50%	
Labour	George William Hincks	628	50%	
Majority		3		
Registered electors		2,778		
Turnout		1,259	45%	
Conservative hold		Swing		

=== 1929 ===
No. 8 St. Peter's
Party	Candidate	Votes	%	±%
Liberal	Lawrence Durning Holt *	1,130	71%	
Labour	Frederick William Tucker	472	29%	
Majority		658		
Registered electors		3,070		
Turnout		1,602	52%	
Liberal hold		Swing		

=== 1930 ===
No. 8 St. Peter's
Party	Candidate	Votes	%	±%
Liberal	Miss Mary Mabel Ellis	850	74%	
Labour	Miss Elsie Emily Louise Hickling	304	26%	
Majority		546		
Registered electors		3,054		
Turnout		1,154	38%	
Liberal hold		Swing		

=== 1931 ===
No. 8 St. Peter's
Party	Candidate	Votes	%	±%
Conservative	Herbert Wolfe Levy	973	81%	
Labour	Joseph Nugent	232	19%	
Majority		741		
Registered electors		2,979		
Turnout		1,205	40%	
Conservative hold		Swing		

=== 1932 ===
No. 8 St. Peter's
Party	Candidate	Votes	%	±%
Liberal	Arthur Robinson	671	52%	
Labour	Robert Edward Cottier	488	38%	
Independent	William Edward McLachlan	130	10%	
Majority		183		
Registered electors		2,853		
Turnout		1,289	45%	
Liberal hold		Swing		

=== 1933 ===
No. 8 St. Peter's
Party	Candidate	Votes	%	±%
Liberal	Mary Mabel Ellis *	666	68%	
Labour	Patrick Campbell	309	32%	
Majority		357		
Registered electors		2,778		
Turnout		975	35%	
Liberal hold		Swing		

=== 1934 ===
No. 8 St. Peter's
Party	Candidate	Votes	%	±%
Conservative	Sydney James Hill	623	58%	
Labour	Stanley Part	445	42%	
Majority		178		
Registered electors		2,761		
Turnout		1,068	39%	
Conservative hold		Swing		

=== 1935 ===
No. 8 St. Peter's
Party	Candidate	Votes	%	±%
Liberal	John Bennion	630	57%	
Labour	Laurence William Kennan	482	43%	
Majority		148		
Registered electors		2,504		
Turnout		1,112	44%	
Liberal hold		Swing		

=== 1936 ===
No. 8 St. Peter's
Party	Candidate	Votes	%	±%
Liberal	Mary Mabel Ellis *	647	62%	
Labour	Laurence William Kennan	393	38%	
Majority		254		
Registered electors		2,455		
Turnout		1,040	42%	
Liberal hold		Swing		

=== 1937 ===
No. 8 St. Peter's
Party	Candidate	Votes	%	±%
Labour	Hugh Carr	551	52%	
Conservative	Sydney James Hill *	512	48%	
Majority		39		
Registered electors		2,353		
Turnout		1,063	45%	
Labour gain from Conservative		Swing		

=== 1938 ===
No. 8 St. Peter's
Party	Candidate	Votes	%	±%
Liberal	John Bennion *	545	59%	
Labour	Robert Edward Cottier	374	41%	
Majority		171		
Registered electors		2,214		
Turnout		919	42%	
Liberal hold		Swing		

=== 1945 ===
St. Peter's
Party	Candidate	Votes	%	±%
Conservative	John D.R.T. Tilney	423	72%	
Labour	Peter James O'Hare	154	26%	
Independent and anti war	F.Bowman	11	2%	
Majority		269		
Registered electors		1,108		
Turnout		588	53%	

=== 1946 ===
St. Peter's
Party	Candidate	Votes	%	±%
Liberal	Mrs Evaline Ida Bligh	370	69%	
Labour	Peter James O'Hare	166	31%	
Majority		204		
Registered electors		1,260		
Turnout		536	43%	

=== 1947 ===
St. Peter's
Party	Candidate	Votes	%	±%
Conservative	James William Brown	411	70%	
Labour	Peter James O'Hare	178	30%	
Majority		233		
Registered electors		1,281		
Turnout		589	46%	
Conservative hold		Swing		

=== 1949 ===
St. Peter's
Party	Candidate	Votes	%	±%
Conservative	Leo Joseph Gerard Wilkinson ^{(PARTY)}	398	60%	−12%
Labour	Harry Livermore	265	40%	+14%
Majority		133		
Registered electors		1,306		
Turnout		663	51%	−2%
Conservative hold		Swing	-12%	

=== 1950 ===
St. Peter's
Party	Candidate	Votes	%	±%
Conservative	Mrs. Evaline Ida Bligh	414	58%	−12%
Labour	Thomas George Dominic McGuire	306	43%	+13%
Majority		108		
Registered electors		1,369		
Turnout		720	53%	+7%
Conservative hold		Swing		

=== 1951 ===
St. Peter's
Party	Candidate	Votes	%	±%
Conservative	James William Brown *	457	59%	−11%
Labour	Mrs. Elsie Ellen Gough	323	41%	+11%
Majority		134		
Registered electors		1,437		
Turnout		780	54%	+8%
Conservative hold		Swing	-11%	

=== 1952 ===
St. Peter's
Party	Candidate	Votes	%	±%
Labour	William Smyth	387	52%	+10%
Conservative	Leo Joseph G. Wilkinson *	355	48%	−12%
Majority		32		
Registered electors		1,458		
Turnout		742	51%	0%
Labour gain from Conservative		Swing		

1952 was the last time elections were held under revised boundaries.

The following wards were abolished: Brunswick, Castle Street, Edge Hill, Exchange, Garston, Great George, Kirkdale, Little Woolton, Much Woolton, North Scotland, St. Anne’s, St. Peter’s, Sefton Park East, Sefton Park West, South Scotland, Walton, Wavertree, Wavertree West, and West Derby. The newly created wards were: Arundel, Broadgreen, Central, Church, Clubmoor, County, Gillmoss, Melrose, Picton, Pirrie, St. James’, St. Mary’s, St. Michael’s, Smithdown, Speke, Tuebrook, Westminster, and Woolton.
